= Administrative divisions of the Sakha Republic =

Administrative districts of Russian federal subject

Sakha (Yakutia) Republic Russia
- Capital: Yakutsk

Administrative structure (as of 2014)
- Districts: 33
- Cities/towns: 13
- Urban-type settlements: 45
- Selsovets: 364

Municipal structure (as of 2002)
- Rural settlements: 590 (inhabited); 39 (uninhabited)

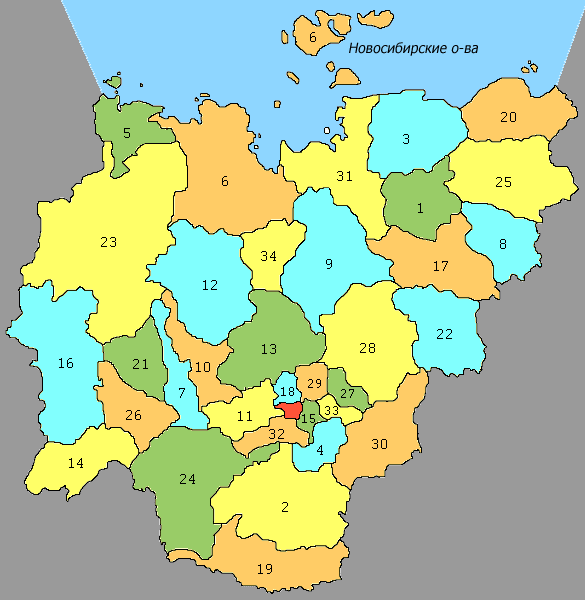
Map of the Sakha Republic

Sakha Republic is a federal subject of Russia.

== Administrative and municipal divisions ==
Map

Division	Structure		OKATO	OKTMO	Urban-type settlement/ district-level town*	Rural (nasleg)
Division	Administrative	Municipal	OKATO	OKTMO	Urban-type settlement/ district-level town*	Rural (nasleg)
Yakutsk (Якутск)	city	urban okrug	98 401	98 701		2
Zhatay (Жатай)	(under Yakutsk)	urban okrug	98 401	98 702		0
Abyysky (Абыйский)	ulus	district	98 201	98 601	Belaya Gora (Белая Гора)	5
Aldansky (Алданский)	district		98 203	98 603	Aldan (Алдан) town*; Tommot (Томмот) town*; Bezymyanny (Безымянный); Lebediny (Лебединый); Leninsky (Ленинский); Nizhny Kuranakh (Нижний Куранах)	3
Allaikhovsky (Аллаиховский)	ulus	district	98 206	98 606	Chokurdakh (Чокурдах)	4
Amginsky (Амгинский)	ulus	district	98 208	98 608		14
Anabarsky (Анабарский)	national ulus	district	98 210	98 610		2
Bulunsky (Булунский)	ulus	district	98 212	98 612	Tiksi (Тикси) (Тиксии)	6
Churapchinsky (Чурапчинский)	ulus	district	98 258	98 658		17
Eveno-Bytantaysky (Эвено-Бытантайский)	national ulus	district	98 259	98 659		3
Gorny (Горный)	ulus	district	98 220	98 620		9
Khangalassky (Хангаласский)	ulus	district	98 244	98 644	Pokrovsk (Покровск) town*; Mokhsogollokh (Мохсоголлох)	16
Kobyaysky (Кобяйский)	ulus	district	98 224	98 624	Sangar (Сангар)	11
Lensky (Ленский)	district		98 227	98 627	Lensk (Ленск) town*; Peleduy (Пеледуй); Vitim (Витим)	8
Megino-Kangalassky (Мегино-Кангаласский)	ulus	district	98 229	98 629	Nizhny Bestyakh (Нижний Бестях)	30
Mirninsky (Мирнинский)	district		98 231	98 631	Mirny (Мирный) town*; Udachny (Удачный) town*; Almazny (Алмазный); Aykhal (Айхал); Chernyshevsky (Чернышевский); Svetly (Светлый)	3
Momsky (Момский)	district		98 233	98 633		6
Namsky (Намский)	ulus	district	98 235	98 635		19
Neryungrinsky (Нерюнгри́нский)	district		98 406	98 660	Neryungri (Нерюнгри) town*; Berkakit (Беркакит); Chulman (Чульман); Khani (Хани); Serebryany Bor (Серебряный Бор); Zolotinka (Золотинка)	1
Nizhnekolymsky (Нижнеколымский)	ulus	district	98 237	98 637	Chersky (Черский)	3
Nyurbinsky (Нюрбинский)	ulus	district	98 226	98 626	Nyurba (Нюрба) (Ньурба) town*	18
Olenyoksky (Оленёкский)	national ulus	district	98 242	98 642		4
Olyokminsky (Олёкминский)	ulus	district	98 241	98 641	Olyokminsk (Олёкминск) town*; Torgo (Торго)	22
Oymyakonsky (Оймяконский)	ulus	district	98 239	98 639	Artyk (Артык); Ust-Nera (Усть-Нера)	5
Srednekolymsky (Среднеколымский)	ulus	district	98 246	98 646	Srednekolymsk (Среднеколымск) town*	9
Suntarsky (Сунтарский)	ulus	district	98 248	98 648		26
Tattinsky (Таттинский)	ulus	district	98 204	98 604		14
Tomponsky (Томпонский)	district		98 250	98 650	Dzhebariki-Khaya (Джебарики-Хая); Khandyga (Хандыга)	7
Ust-Aldansky (Усть-Алданский)	ulus	district	98 252	98 652		21
Ust-Maysky (Усть-Майский)	ulus	district	98 254	98 654	Eldikan (Эльдикан); Solnechny (Солнечный); Ust-Maya (Усть-Мая); Yugoryonok (Югорёнок); Zvyozdochka (Звёздочка)	5
Ust-Yansky (Усть-Янский)	ulus	district	98 256	98 656	Deputatsky (Депутатский); Nizhneyansk (Нижнеянск); Tenkeli (Тенкели); Ust-Kuyga (Усть-Куйга)	7
Verkhnekolymsky (Верхнеколымский)	ulus	district	98 215	98 615	Zyryanka (Зырянка)	5
Verkhnevilyuysky (Верхневилюйский)	ulus	district	98 214	98 614		21
Verkhoyansky (Верхоянский)	ulus	district	98 216	98 616	Verkhoyansk (Верхоянск) (Верхоянскай) town*; Batagay (Батагай); Ese-Khayya (Эсэ-Хайя)	14
Vilyuysky (Вилюйский)	ulus	district	98 218	98 618	Vilyuysk (Вилюйск) town*; Kysyl-Syr (Кысыл-Сыр)	19
Zhigansky (Жиганский)	national ulus	district	98 222	98 622		4
