= Khanda (river) =

Khanda Yakut: Ханда Belaya
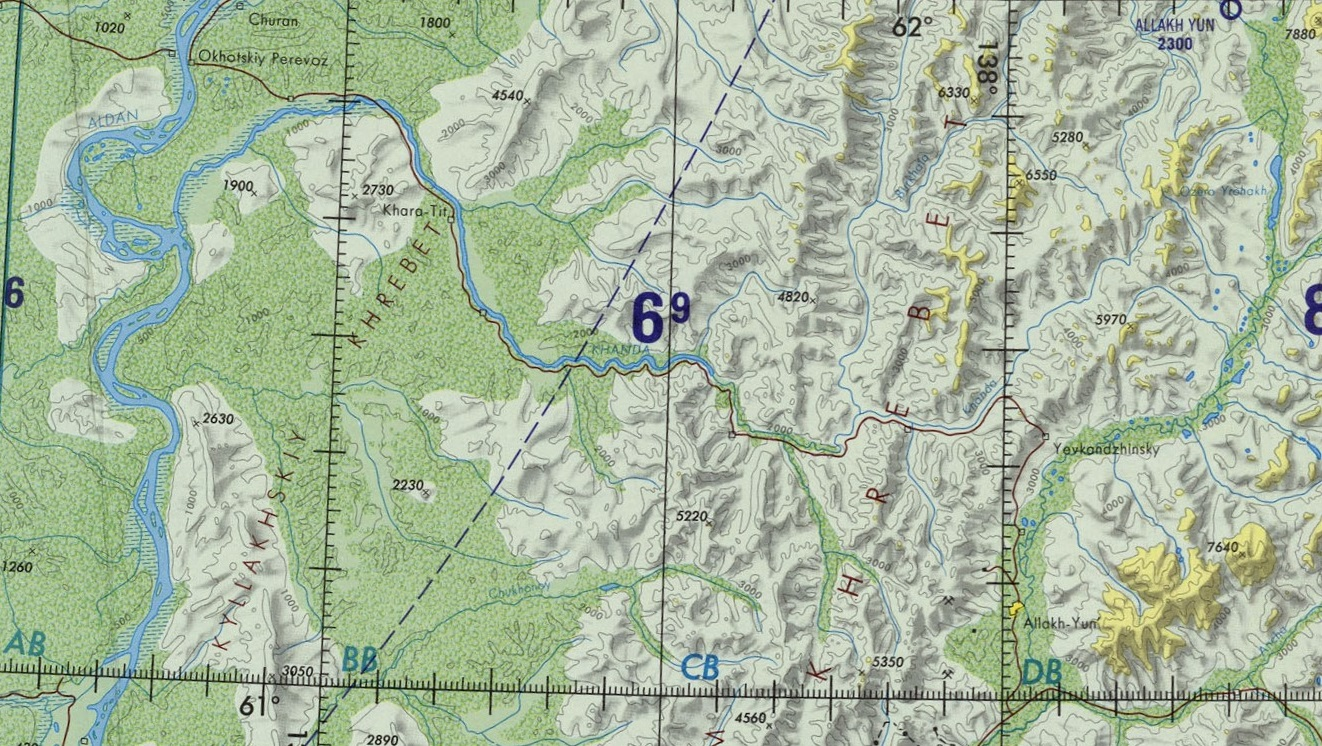
- Course of the Khanda River

- Mouth location in Yakutia, Russia

Location
- Country: Russian Federation

Physical characteristics
- Source: Sette-Daban, Verkhoyansk Range
  - coordinates: 61°42′21″N 138°22′55″E
- Mouth: Aldan River
  - coordinates: 61°37′57″N 135°30′13″E
- Length: 281 km (175 mi)
- Basin size: 870 km^{2} (340 sq mi)
- Discharge
  - average: 2.099 m^{3}/s (74.1 cu ft/s)

Basin features
- Progression: Aldan→ Lena→ Laptev Sea

The Khanda (Russian: Ханда; Yakut: Ханда, Xanda), also known as Belaya (Russian: Белая), is a river in the Sakha Republic (Yakutia), Russia, a right tributary of the Aldan, part of the Lena basin.

The Khanda has a length of 281 kilometres (175 mi) and a drainage basin area of 8,790 square kilometres (3,390 mi^{2}). There are no settlements in the area of the river. The nearest inhabited places are Khandyga of Tompo District and Eldikan of Ust-Maysky District to the north and south of the river's mouth respectively.

In the International scale of river difficulty the Khanda is a Class II destination for rafting and kayaking.

== Course ==
The Khanda originates in the Sette-Daban slopes, not far west of the Skalisty Range, in the southern area of the Verkhoyansk mountain system.

In the upper section of its course the river flows across mountainous terrain, heading roughly westwards and cutting across the Ulakhan-Bom. The river turns then northwestwards flanking the northern end of the Kyllakh Range. Finally the Khanda makes a wide bend to the southwest and meets the right bank of the Aldan River, about 140 km (87 mi) downstream from the mouth of the Allakh-Yun, 623 km (387 mi) from the confluence of the Aldan with the Lena River.

The main tributaries of the Khanda are the 89 km (55 mi) long Burkhala (Бурхала) and the 70 km (43 mi) long Mutula (Мутула). The river freezes in October and stays frozen until May.

== See also ==
- List of rivers of Russia
