= Ust-Ynykchan =

Ust-Ynykchan Усть-Ыныкчан
- Selo
- Interactive map of Ust-Ynykchan
- Location of Ust-Ynykchan Ust-Ynykchan (Sakha Republic)
- Coordinates: 60°15′N 137°31′E
- Country: Russia
- Federal subject: Sakha Republic
- Administrative district: Ust-Maysky District
- Urban okrugSelsoviet: Solnechny Urban Okrug

Population
  - Estimate (2002): 12 )

Municipal status
  - Municipal district: Ust-Maysky Municipal District
  - Rural settlement: Solnechny Urban Settlement
- Time zone: UTC+
- Postal code: 678635
- OKTMO ID: 98654158106

Ust-Ynykchan (Russian: Усть-Ыныкчан; Yakut: Уус Ыныкчаан, romanized: Uus Inıkçaan) is a rural locality (a selo), and one of two settlements in Solnechny Urban Okrug of Ust-Maysky District in the Sakha Republic, Russia, in addition to Solnechny, the administrative center of the Urban Okrug. It is located 271 kilometers (168 mi) from Ust-Maya, the administrative center of the district, and 5 kilometers (3.1 mi) from Solnechny. Its population as of the 2002 Census was 12.
