= Troitsk, Ust-Maysky District, Sakha Republic =

Troitsk Троицк
- Selo
- Interactive map of Troitsk
- Location of Troitsk Troitsk (Sakha Republic)
- Coordinates: 60°20′N 134°28′E
- Country: Russia
- Federal subject: Sakha Republic
- Administrative district: Ust-Maysky District
- Rural okrugSelsoviet: Petropavlovsky National Rural Okrug
- Elevation: 195 m (640 ft)

Population
  - Estimate (2002): 108 )

Municipal status
  - Municipal district: Ust-Maysky Municipal District
  - Rural settlement: Petropavlovsky National Rural Settlement
- Time zone: UTC+
- Postal code: 678726
- OKTMO ID: 98654420106

Troitsk (Russian: Троицк) is a rural locality (a selo), and one of two settlements in Petropavlovsky National Rural Okrug of Ust-Maysky District in the Sakha Republic, Russia, in addition to Petropavlovsk, the administrative center of the Rural Okrug. It is located 11 kilometers (6.8 mi) from Ust-Maya, the administrative center of the district and 3 kilometers (1.9 mi) from Petropavlovsk. Its population as of the 2002 Census was 74.
