= Solnechny Urban Settlement =

Solnechny Urban Settlement is the name of two municipal formations in Russia.

- Solnechny Urban Settlement, a municipal formation which the work settlement of Solnechny and the settlement of Khalgaso in Solnechny District of Khabarovsk Krai are incorporated as
- Solnechny Urban Settlement, a municipal formation which the Settlement of Solnechny in Ust-Maysky District of the Sakha Republic is incorporated as

== See also ==
- Solnechny (disambiguation)
- Solnechnoye, Saint Petersburg, a municipal settlement in the federal city of St. Petersburg
