= Allakh-Yun =

Allakh-Yun Аллах-Юнь
- Urban-type settlement

Other transcription(s)
  - Yakut: Ааллаах Үүн
- Interactive map of Allakh-Yun
- Location of Allakh-Yun Allakh-Yun (Sakha Republic)
- Coordinates: 61°08′N 138°03′E
- Country: Russia
- Federal subject: Sakha Republic
- Administrative district: Ust-Maysky District
- SettlementSelsoviet: Settlement of Allakh-Yun
- Founded: 1930s
- Urban-type settlement status since: 1937
- Elevation: 564 m (1,850 ft)

Population (2010 Census)
  - Total: 96
  - Estimate (2021): 35 (−63.5%)

Administrative status
  - Capital of: Settlement of Allakh-Yun

Municipal status
  - Municipal district: Ust-Maysky Municipal District
- Postal code: 678640

Allakh-Yun population
- 2010 Census: 96
- 2002 Census: 306
- 1989 Census: 2,183
- 1979 Census: 1,903

Allakh-Yun (Russian: Алла́х-Юнь; Yakut: Ааллаах Үүн) is an urban locality (an urban-type settlement) in Ust-Maysky District of the Sakha Republic, Russia, located 306 kilometers (190 mi) from Ust-Maya, the administrative center of the district, in the Yudoma-Maya Highlands on the right bank of the Allakh-Yun River, after which it was named. As of the 2010 Census, its population was 96.

== History ==
It was founded in the 1930s as the first gold prospecting center in the region and was granted urban-type settlement status in 1937. The surrounding territory was separated out of Ust-Maysky District in 1940 as Allakh-Yunsky District, with the administrative center in Allakh-Yun. In 1948, the administrative center was moved to Eldikan and in 1953, the district was merged back into Ust-Maysky District. With the cessation of mining activities in the 1990s, almost the entire population left.

== Administrative and municipal status ==
Within the framework of administrative divisions, the urban-type settlement of Allakh-Yun is incorporated within Ust-Maysky District as the Settlement of Allakh-Yun. Within the framework of municipal divisions, Allakh-Yun is located on the intersettlement territory of Ust-Maysky Municipal District.

== Transportation ==
Allakh-Yun is at the end of a 100-kilometer (62 mi) long road, which connects to the road from Eldikan to Yugoryonok. This is its only connection to the outside world, since the closure of the small local airport in the 1990s.

== Climate ==
Allakh-Yun has a monsoon-influenced, extreme subarctic climate (Köppen climate classification Dwd) with long, extremely cold and dry winters and short, very mild summers.

Climate data for Allakh-Yun
Month	Jan	Feb	Mar	Apr	May	Jun	Jul	Aug	Sep	Oct	Nov	Dec	Year
Record high °C (°F)	−3.0 (26.6)	−5.0 (23.0)	4.4 (39.9)	13.4 (56.1)	29.0 (84.2)	32.8 (91.0)	32.2 (90.0)	33.0 (91.4)	24.8 (76.6)	9.0 (48.2)	−0.4 (31.3)	−1.1 (30.0)	33.0 (91.4)
Mean daily maximum °C (°F)	−38.3 (−36.9)	−29.6 (−21.3)	−14.9 (5.2)	−1.9 (28.6)	9.1 (48.4)	18.6 (65.5)	21.7 (71.1)	18.7 (65.7)	9.4 (48.9)	−6.6 (20.1)	−26.3 (−15.3)	−36.0 (−32.8)	−6.3 (20.7)
Daily mean °C (°F)	−42.1 (−43.8)	−36.3 (−33.3)	−23.9 (−11.0)	−8.9 (16.0)	3.3 (37.9)	11.8 (53.2)	14.8 (58.6)	11.6 (52.9)	3.2 (37.8)	−12.1 (10.2)	−31.1 (−24.0)	−39.7 (−39.5)	−12.5 (9.5)
Mean daily minimum °C (°F)	−45.9 (−50.6)	−42.3 (−44.1)	−32.8 (−27.0)	−17.6 (0.3)	−3.9 (25.0)	3.4 (38.1)	6.3 (43.3)	4.0 (39.2)	−3.1 (26.4)	−18.1 (−0.6)	−35.8 (−32.4)	−43.6 (−46.5)	−19.1 (−2.4)
Record low °C (°F)	−55.9 (−68.6)	−52.8 (−63.0)	−46.2 (−51.2)	−41.1 (−42.0)	−22.8 (−9.0)	−6.0 (21.2)	−5.1 (22.8)	−9.0 (15.8)	−16.1 (3.0)	−38.0 (−36.4)	−52.2 (−62.0)	−55.0 (−67.0)	−55.9 (−68.6)
Average precipitation mm (inches)	1.5 (0.06)	2.3 (0.09)	16.1 (0.63)	49.0 (1.93)	28.1 (1.11)	53.2 (2.09)	60.2 (2.37)	46.4 (1.83)	50.2 (1.98)	64.5 (2.54)	11.2 (0.44)	2.5 (0.10)	385.2 (15.17)
