= Ust-Maya Airport =

- IATA: UMS; ICAO: UEMU; LID: УСМ

Summary
- Airport type: Public
- Serves: Ust-Maya, Ust-Maysky District, Sakha Republic, Russia
- Coordinates: 60°21′50″N 134°26′56″E

Maps
- Sakha Republic in Russia

- Location of the airport in the Sakha Republic

Runways
Direction	Length		Surface
Direction	m	ft	Surface
04/22	1,400	4,593	Asphalt
- Sources: GCM, STV

Ust-Maya Airport (Russian: Аэропорт Усть-Мая) (IATA: UMS, ICAO: UEMU) is an airport serving the urban locality of Ust-Maya, Ust-Maysky District, in the Sakha Republic of Russia.

== Airlines and destinations ==
Airlines	Destinations
Polar Airlines	Yakutsk

== See also ==
- List of airports in Russia
