= Skalisty Range =

Mountain range in Yakutia, Russia

- Скалистый хребет
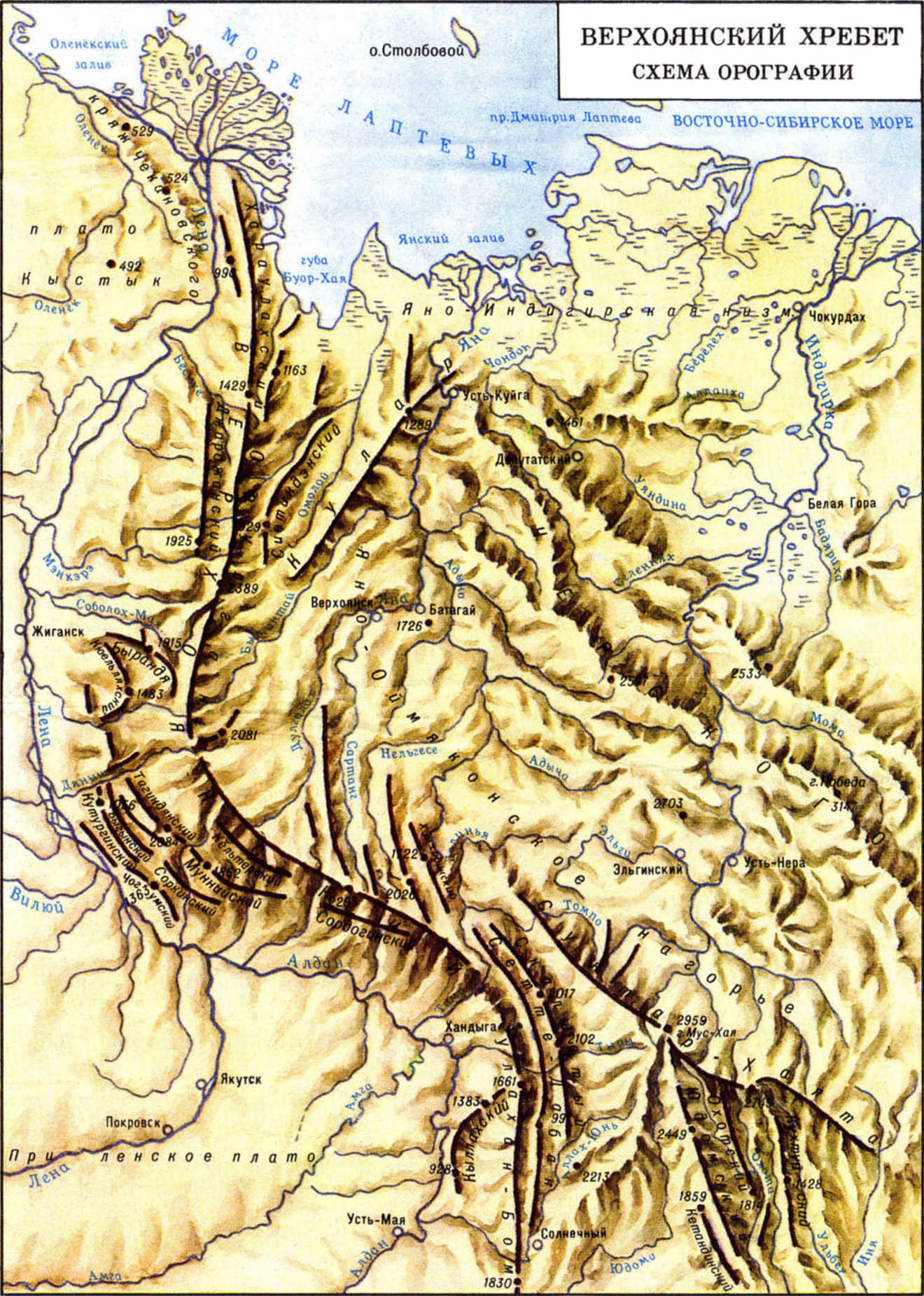
- The Verkhoyansk Range, including the Sette-Daban and Suntar-Khayata

Highest point
- Peak: Unnamed
- Elevation: 2,017 m (6,617 ft)

Dimensions
- Length: 150 km (93 mi) NNW/SSE

Geography
- Location within Sakha Republic
- Location: Sakha Republic (Yakutia), Russian Far East
- Range coordinates: 62°40′N 138°40′E
- Parent range: Verkhoyansk Range; East Siberian System

Geology
- Orogeny: Alpine orogeny
- Rock type(s): Sandstone, limestone

The Skalisty Range (Russian: Скалистый хребет; Yakut: Скалистай) is a range of mountains in far North-eastern Russia, part of the East Siberian System. Administratively the mountain chain belongs to the Sakha Republic. The area of the range is remote and desolate. The R504 Kolyma Highway passes through the northern part of the range.

== History ==
The Skalisty Range, meaning "rocky" owing to numerous pointed crags of naked rock crowning the range, was relatively unknown until 1934. It was first surveyed by an expedition sent by the government of the Soviet Union led by geologist Yuri Bilibin (1901–1952) together with mining engineer Evgeny Bobin (1897–1941). Though located near the southern end of the Verkhoyansk Range, this remote mountain area had formerly not been considered part of it by geographers, along with the other ranges south and southeast of the course of the Aldan River and the Tompo. After conducting the first topographic survey of the area, Bilibin established that this range belongs to the Verkhoyansk Mountain System. Bilibin and Bobin also explored for the first time this range, along with the adjacent Sette-Daban and Yudoma-Maya Highlands.

== Geography ==
The Skalisty Range stretches roughly from north to south for about 150 kilometres (93 mi) to the east of the Sette-Daban and Ulakhan-Bom and parallel to them. It is bound in the northwest by the Tompo River, which separates it from the Verkhoyansk Range proper. To the south the Allakh-Yun River valley separates it from the Yudoma-Maya Highlands. Both the Tompo and the Allakh Yun are tributaries of the Aldan River. To the northeast and east it connects with the Suntar-Khayata Range. In the southern part the Eastern Khandyga and the Tyry, also tributaries of the Aldan, cut across the range dividing into separate sections. The highest point of the mountain chain is an unnamed peak reaching 2,017 metres (6,617 ft) or 2,079 metres (6,821 ft) according to other sources,

== Flora ==
The slopes of the range are covered by deciduous forests, giving way to mountain tundra at elevations above 1,300 metres (4,300 ft).

== See also ==
- List of mountains and hills of Russia
