= Sette-Daban =

Mountain range in Russia

- Сетте-Дабан / Сэттэ Дабаан
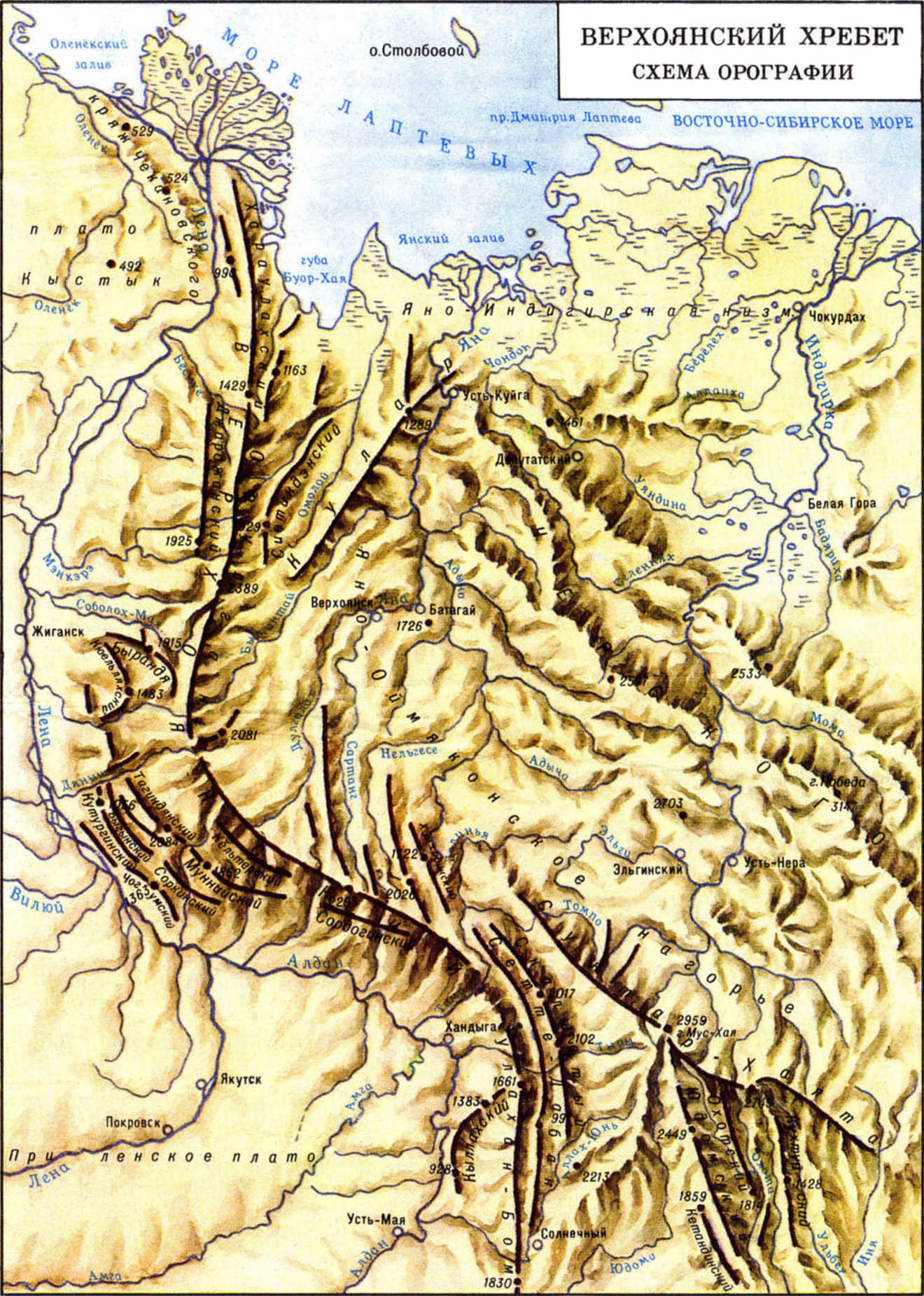
- The Verkhoyansk Range, including the Sette-Daban and Suntar-Khayata

Highest point
- Peak: Unnamed
- Elevation: 2,102 m (6,896 ft)

Dimensions
- Length: 650 km (400 mi) NNE/SSW

Geography
- Location within Far Eastern Federal District
- Location: Sakha (Yakutia), Khabarovsk Krai, Russian Far East
- Range coordinates: 62°N 138°E
- Parent range: Verkhoyansk Range

Geology
- Orogeny: Alpine orogeny
- Rock ages: Paleozoic and Permian
- Rock type(s): Sandstone, limestone, granite intrusions

Climbing
- Easiest route: From Ust-Maya or Khandyga

The Sette-Daban (Russian: Сетте-Дабан, Yakut: Сэттэ Дабаан) is a range of mountains in far North-eastern Russia. Administratively the range belongs partly to the Sakha Republic and partly to the Khabarovsk Krai of the Russian Federation. The area of the Sette-Daban is largely uninhabited. The R504 Kolyma Highway passes through the northern part of the range.

The climate prevailing in the Sette-Daban is continental and severe. The average air temperature in January is a chilly −34 °C (−29 °F). The average temperature in the river valleys may reach a maximum of 18 °C (64 °F) in July.

== History ==
In 1829, German physicist Georg Adolf Erman during a round-the-world (1828-1830) journey reported the existence of "Seven Ranges" (Sette Daban) between 135° and 140° E in the area of one of the upper tributaries of the Yudoma.

Erman left the valley of the Aldan at Aldanskaia (somewhat south of lat. 62° N.) and travelled east-south-east to the Okhota. It is not impossible that his route lay partly in the foot-hills of the Verkhoiansk mountains. He had hitherto observed, as far as Aldanskaia, horizontal beds of limestone similar to those of the Lena. But beyond this point the limestone becomes affected by violent disturbances, and the country, hitherto low, rises to between 600 and 700 meters. At first, near Garnastach, only grey limestone was met with, dipping steeply to the south-west. The highest range is formed by the Sem Khrebti (Seven mountains); they consist of clay slates, also dipping to the south-west.

The range was surveyed in 1934 by geologist Yuri Bilibin (1901—1952) together with mining engineer Evgeny Bobin (1897—1941) in the course of an expedition sent by the government of the Soviet Union. After conducting the first topographic survey of the area Bilibin established that this chain consists of three parallel ridges with pointed, often rocky peaks, and that it belongs to the Verkhoyansk Mountain System. Bilibin and Bobin also explored for the first time the Yudoma-Maya Highlands and the Skalisty Range, directly adjacent to Sette-Daban.

== Geography ==
The Sette-Daban is a range located in southeastern Yakutia, at the southern end of the Verkhoyansk Range, part of the East Siberian System of mountains. It is bound in the north by the Tompo River and in the west by the Ulakhan-Bom, in the east by the Skalisty Range and to the south and east flows the Allakh-Yun River valley, beyond which rise the Dzhugdzhur Range and the Stanovoy Highlands, to the west by the Aldan River valley beyond which rises the Lena Plateau. To the northeast rises the Suntar-Khayata Range and to the east, the Yudoma-Maya Highlands. The highest point of the Sette-Daban is an unnamed peak reaching 2,102 metres (6,896 ft).

The area of the range is crossed from north to south by the Yudoma river valley. The Eastern Khandyga River, the Tyry and the Khanda have their sources in the range.

== Flora and fauna ==
The slopes of the range are covered by larch forests, giving way to dwarf cedar thickets and mountain tundra at elevations above 1,000 metres (3,300 ft).

The lower altitudes of the Sette-Daban mountains provide a habitat for the Siberian Wood Frog and the Siberian Salamander.

== See also ==
- List of mountains and hills of Russia
