= Yuriy Yekhanurov =

Prime Minister of Ukraine from 2005 to 2006

- Юрій Єхануров
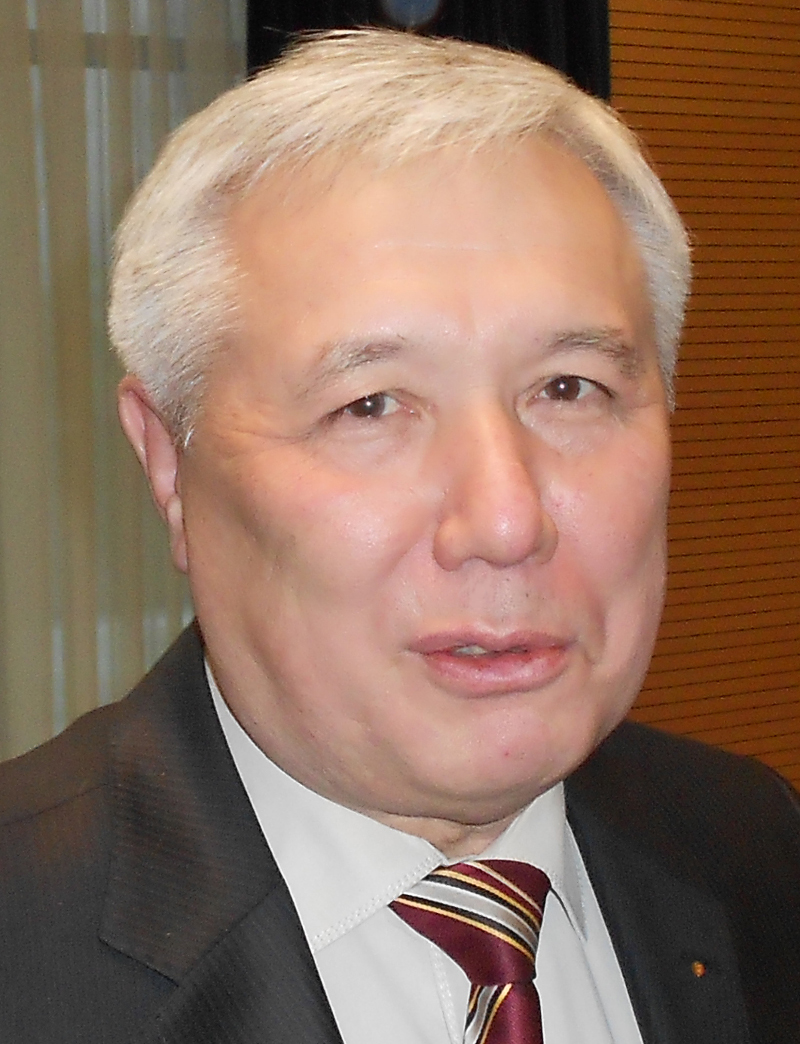
- Yekhanurov in 2013

Minister of Defence
- In office December 18, 2007 – June 5, 2009
- President: Viktor Yushchenko
- Cabinet: Second Tymoshenko Government
- Preceded by: Anatoliy Hrytsenko
- Succeeded by: Valeriy Ivashchenko (acting)

11th Prime Minister of Ukraine
- In office September 8, 2005 – August 4, 2006; Acting September 8–22, 2005
- President: Viktor Yushchenko
- Cabinet: Yekhanurov Government
- Preceded by: Yulia Tymoshenko
- Succeeded by: Viktor Yanukovych

Governor of Dnipropetrovsk Region
- In office April 1, 2005 – September 8, 2005
- President: Viktor Yushchenko

Minister of Economy of Ukraine
- In office February 26, 1997 – July 25, 1997
- Prime Minister: Pavlo Lazarenko
- Cabinet: Lazarenko Government
- Preceded by: Vasyl Hureyev
- Succeeded by: Viktor Suslov

Director of State Property Fund
- In office 1994–1997
- President: Leonid Kuchma
- Preceded by: Volodymyr Pryadko
- Succeeded by: Volodymyr Lanovy (acting)

People's Deputy of Ukraine

3rd convocation
- In office May 12, 1998 – February 22, 2000
- Constituency: People's Democratic Party, Zhytomyr Oblast, District No.64

4th convocation
- In office May 14, 2002 – June 23, 2005
- Constituency: Independent, No.26

5th convocation
- In office May 25, 2006 – June 8, 2007
- Constituency: Our Ukraine, No.1

6th convocation
- In office November 23, 2007 – December 19, 2007
- Constituency: Our Ukraine, No.24

Personal details
- Born: August 23, 1948 (age 78) Belkachi, Yakut ASSR, Russian SFSR, Soviet Union (now Sakha Republic, Russia)
- Party: Revival
- Other political affiliations: People's Union Our Ukraine; People's Democratic Party
- Education: Kyiv National Economic University; Kyiv University
- Occupation: Politician
- Notable works: Understanding Technology in the Context of National Development: Critical Reflections
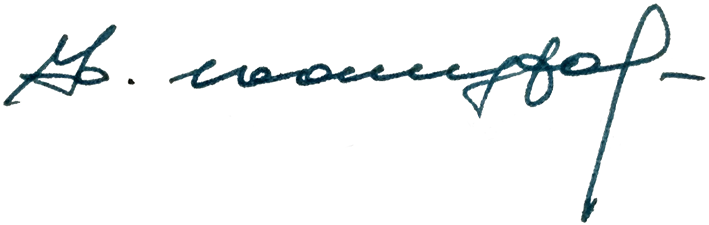
- Signature
- Website: www.yekhanurov.com

Yuriy Ivanovych Yekhanurov (Note: Ukrainian: Юрій Іванович Єхануров, pronounced [ˈjur⁽ʲ⁾ij iˈwanowɪtʃ jexɐˈnurou̯]; Russian: Ю́рий Ива́нович Ехану́ров.) (born 23 August 1948) is a Ukrainian politician who was Prime Minister of Ukraine from 2005 to 2006 and Minister of Defense from 2007 to 2009.

== Background and professional career ==
Yekhanurov was born in the village Belkachi in the far-north Yakut ASSR, which is currently the Sakha Republic within the Russian Federation. His father, Ivan Mikhailovich Yekhanurov is an ethnic Buryat, while his mother, Galina Ivanovna Yekhanurova (Helena Yanivna Trybel) is an ethnic Pole. Between 1955 and 1963 Yuriy Yekhanurov attended a school in the village of Buy, Bichursky District, Buryatia. In 1963 he moved to Kyiv, Ukraine, where he has spent most of his life and career. He holds a PhD-equivalent degree in Economics, is married, and has one son.

Yekhanurov graduated from a construction Technical School in 1967, and the Kyiv National Economic University in 1973. As his first job in 1974, he was assigned as a manager of a reinforced concrete plant at the state company "Kyivmiskbud-4". Yekhanurov quickly rose through the ranks, moving on to the "Stroydetal'" industrial group from 1985 to 1988. In that year, he was appointed deputy chairman of the Kyiv construction directorate, the "GolovKyivMiskBud".

== Statesman and politician ==
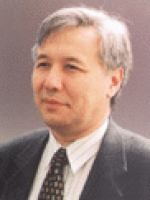
Yekhanurov in 1998

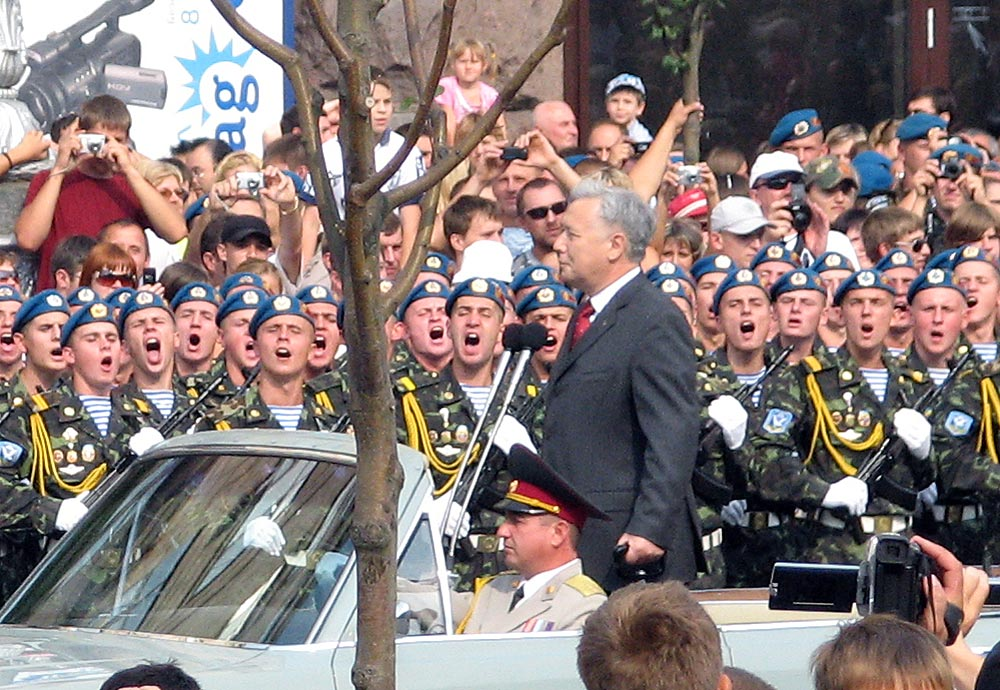
Yuriy Yekhanurov inspecting troops of the 95th Airmobile Brigade on Khreshchatyk in Kyiv on the Independence day 2008.

When Ukraine gained independence in 1991, Yekhanurov started working for the Kyiv municipal government, overseeing economic reforms. He was appointed Deputy Minister of Economy of Ukraine in 1993, and later headed the State Property Fund of Ukraine (which coordinated the privatisation) from 1994 to 1997. Yekhanurov also served for a short time as Minister of Economy in the cabinet of Pavlo Lazarenko in 1997. He was elected member of the Ukrainian parliament, the Verkhovna Rada, in 1998.

When Viktor Yushchenko was appointed Prime Minister of Ukraine in 1999, Yekhanurov joined his cabinet as First Vice Prime Minister. After the ousting of the government in 2001, Yekhanurov joined Yushchenko's People's Union Our Ukraine and was elected again a member of parliament. In June 2002, he was appointed Head of the State Committee for Industrial Policy and Entrepreneurship.

After the Orange Revolution in 2005, Yekhanurov was appointed Head of the Dnipropetrovsk Oblast State Administration (i.e. a governor) on April 1, 2005. He was also elected head of the Central Executive Committee of People's Union Our Ukraine party.

== Prime minister ==
On September 8, 2005, Yekhanurov was appointed acting prime minister by President Viktor Yushchenko, after the President had sacked the previous Cabinet of Ministers of Ukraine. He was succeeded by Victor Yanukovich on August 4, 2006. Yekhanurov's candidacy was hotly contested in parliament, most notably by former prime minister and Yushchenko's ally Yulia Tymoshenko. His confirmation required two rounds of voting; in the first round on September 20, 2005, Yekhanurov was only three votes short of the 226 needed for approval. On September 22, 2005, after negotiations between President Yushchenko and opposition groups, he was approved by 289 deputies out of 339 present. The CPU and SDPU(o) factions abstained from voting.

Yekhanurov was widely regarded as an experienced administrator, a caretaker rather than a politician. Like Yushchenko, he is a supporter of economic liberalization and privatisation, but opposed "reprivatization" of previously sold companies that were thought to have been privatized illegally under the administration of President Leonid Kuchma.

Yekhanurov government lost a vote of no confidence on January 10, 2006 but stayed in power until the parliamentary election two months later.

After the signing of a coalition agreement (June 22, 2006) by the political parties behind the "Orange Revolution" it was agreed that Yulia Tymoshenko would be restored as Prime Minister of Ukraine after nearly three months of negotiating and political uncertainty. Yulia Tymoshenko election was expected to be only a formality but opposition members (Party of Regions & Communist Party of Ukraine) blocked the parliament from Thursday, June 29, 2006 till Thursday, July 6, 2006 because they felt they hadn't got enough chairmen in parliamentary committees Yekhanurov was skeptical about the new government and he wanted the Party of Regions to be a part of the new government He felt that would have been better for the stability of Ukraine.

== Gas crisis of 2005–2006 and fallout ==
Late 2005/January 2006, Russia and Ukraine had a serious dispute over the import of gas. Russia had been charging Ukraine traditionally low prices for gas, but decided to increase them to reflect the market price, breaking the previously signed contract that was to last through 2010. After cutting off the flow of gas to Ukraine for several days, a complicated deal was struck on January 4, 2006. According to President Yushchenko and Yekhanurov, it was a compromise.

Nonetheless, the Ukrainian parliament was not happy with the deal, and passed a vote of no-confidence on January 10, 2006. But President Yushchenko "quickly dismissed the vote as a publicity stunt by the opposition" Yekhanurov continued to perform his duties until the newly elected Verkhovna Rada convened and formed a majority in July. He was succeeded by Viktor Yanukovych.

== Minister of Defense of Ukraine ==
As part of the President quota of Ministers in the Ukrainian cabinet appointed on December 18, 2007, Yekhanurov became Minister of Defense in the second Tymoshenko cabinet. Accusing him of corruption Prime Minister Yulia Tymoshenko turned to President Yushchenko with a request to dismiss Yekhanurov as Defense Minister of Ukraine on May 20, 2009. Yekhanurov immediately denied the accusations and told journalists "Decisions must be made every day. But, not to be busy with budget problems, they organize such shows as today". on May 26, 2009, President Yushchenko stated he had no intend to dismiss Yekhanurov claiming “there is nothing but a political attack and a staff war”. According to Yushchenko similar political attacks had been launched against the foreign minister, State Property Fund head, and the National Bank of Ukraine governor. The same day Yekhanurov threatened to sue Prime Minister Tymoshenko "to defend his honor and dignity", if she did not apologize, and if Supervision and Revision Department head Mykola Syvulskiy did not resign. June 5, 2009, the Ukrainian parliament dismissed Yuriy Yekhanurov as defense minister. 363 MPs out of the 398 registered in the parliament's session hall voted for his dismissal, including 161 MPs of the Party of Regions, 152 MPs of the Bloc of Yulia Tymoshenko, four MPs of the Our Ukraine-People's Self-Defense Bloc, 27 MPs of the Communist Party, and 19 MPs of the Bloc of Lytvyn. Yekhanurov challenged his dismissal in court, but the Kyiv District Administrative Court rejected his relevant appeal on July 9, 2009.

== Books authored ==
Tiwari, Siddhartha Paul; Kostenko, Oleksii; Yekhanurov, Yuriy (2025). Understanding Technology in the Context of National Development: Critical Reflections. SciFormat Publishing Inc., 2734 17 Avenue Southwest Calgary, Alberta, Canada, T3E 0A7. ISBN 978-1-0690482-3-3.

== Books edited ==
Kostenko, Oleksii; Yekhanurov, Yuriy (2024). Digital Transformation in Ukraine: AI, Metaverse, and Society 5.0. Scientific Approbation. SciFormat Publishing Inc., 2734 17 Avenue Southwest Calgary, Alberta, Canada, T3E 0A7. ISBN 978-1-0690482-1-9.

== Later career ==
From July 2009 till February 2010 Yekhanurov was first deputy head of the Ukrainian Presidential Secretariat. After his political career he became a professor at the Taras Shevchenko National University of Kyiv.

In the October 2015 Ukrainian local elections Yekhanurov was a candidate for Mayor of Kyiv for the party Revival. He did not survive the first round of the Mayoral election.

== See also ==
- Buryats
- Politics of Ukraine
- Viktor Yushchenko
- Leonid Kuchma
- Revival (Political Party of Ukraine)

== Notes ==
Government offices
Preceded by Volodymyr Pryadko	Director of State Property Fund of Ukraine; 1994–1997	Succeeded by Volodymyr Lanovyi; Acting
Political offices
Preceded by Vasyl Hureyev	Minister of Economy; 1997	Succeeded by Viktor Suslov
Preceded by Sergey Kasyanov	Governor of Dnipropetrovsk Oblast; 2005	Succeeded by Nadiia Deyeva
Preceded by Yulia Tymoshenko	Prime Minister of Ukraine; 2005–2006	Succeeded by Viktor Yanukovych
Preceded by Anatoliy Hrytsenko	Minister of Defence; 2007–2009	Succeeded by Valeriy Ivaschenko; Acting
