= Kyuptsy =

Kyuptsy Кюпцы
- Selo
- Interactive map of Kyuptsy
- Location of Kyuptsy Kyuptsy (Sakha Republic)
- Coordinates: 60°51′N 135°19′E
- Country: Russia
- Federal subject: Sakha Republic
- Administrative district: Ust-Maysky District
- Rural okrugSelsoviet: Kyupsky National Rural Okrug
- Elevation: 143 m (469 ft)

Population
  - Estimate (2002): 623 )

Administrative status
  - Capital of: Kyupsky National Rural Okrug

Municipal status
  - Municipal district: Ust-Maysky Municipal District
  - Rural settlement: Kyupsky National Rural Settlement
  - Capital of: Kyupsky National Rural Settlement
- Time zone: UTC+
- Postal code: 678624
- OKTMO ID: 98654410101

Kyuptsy (Russian: Кюпцы) is a rural locality (a selo) and the administrative center, and one of two inhabited localities including Tumul of Kyupsky National Rural Okrug in Ust-Maysky District of the Sakha Republic, Russia, located 74 kilometers (46 mi) from Ust-Maya, the administrative center of the district. Its population at the 2002 census was 294.
