= Ezhantsy =

Ezhantsy Эжанцы
- Selo
- Interactive map of Ezhantsy
- Location of Ezhantsy Ezhantsy (Sakha Republic)
- Coordinates: 60°28′N 135°10′E
- Country: Russia
- Federal subject: Sakha Republic
- Administrative district: Ust-Maysky District
- Rural okrugSelsoviet: Ezhansky National Rural Okrug
- Elevation: 161 m (528 ft)

Population (2010 Census)
  - Total: 360
  - Estimate (2021): 305 (−15.3%)

Administrative status
  - Capital of: Ezhansky National Rural Okrug

Municipal status
  - Municipal district: Ust-Maysky Municipal District
  - Rural settlement: Ezhansky National Rural Settlement
  - Capital of: Ezhansky National Rural Settlement
- Time zone: UTC+
- Postal code: 678630
- OKTMO ID: 98654425101

Ezhantsy (Russian: Эжанцы; Yakut: Эдьээн, Eceen) is a rural locality (a selo), the only inhabited locality, and the administrative center of Ezhansky National Rural Okrug in Ust-Maysky District of the Sakha Republic, Russia, located 55 kilometers (34 mi) from Ust-Maya, the administrative center of the district. Its population as of the 2010 Census was 360, down from 536 recorded during the 2002 Census.
