= Ust-Mil =

Ust-Mil Усть-Миль
- Selo
- Interactive map of Ust-Mil
- Location of Ust-Mil Ust-Mil (Sakha Republic)
- Coordinates: 59°38′N 133°06′E
- Country: Russia
- Federal subject: Sakha Republic
- Administrative district: Ust-Maysky District
- Rural okrugSelsoviet: Milsky Rural Okrug
- Elevation: 182 m (597 ft)

Population (2010 Census)
  - Total: 292
  - Estimate (2021): 190 (−34.9%)

Administrative status
  - Capital of: Milsky Rural Okrug

Municipal status
  - Municipal district: Ust-Maysky Municipal District
  - Rural settlement: Ust-Mil Rural Settlement
  - Capital of: Ust-Mil Rural Settlement
- Time zone: UTC+
- Postal code: 678622
- OKTMO ID: 98654415101

Ust-Mil (Russian: Усть-Миль; Yakut: Мил, Mil) is a rural locality (a selo), the only inhabited locality, and the administrative center of Milsky Rural Okrug in Ust-Maysky District of the Sakha Republic, Russia, located 131 kilometers (81 mi) from Ust-Maya, the administrative center of the district. Its population as of the 2010 Census was 292, down from 405 recorded during the 2002 Census. On 5 July 2022, a maximum temperature of 37.8 °C (100.0 °F) was registered.
