= Tumul, Ust-Maysky District, Sakha Republic =

Tumul Тумул
- Selo
- Interactive map of Tumul
- Location of Tumul Tumul (Sakha Republic)
- Coordinates: 60°58′N 135°16′E
- Country: Russia
- Federal subject: Sakha Republic
- Administrative district: Ust-Maysky District
- Rural okrugSelsoviet: Kyupsky Rural Okrug

Population
  - Estimate (2002): 73 )

Municipal status
  - Municipal district: Ust-Maysky Municipal District
  - Rural settlement: Kyupsky Rural Settlement
- Time zone: UTC+
- Postal code: 678624
- OKTMO ID: 98654410106

Tumul (Russian: Тумул; Yakut: Тумул) is a rural locality (a selo) in Kyupsky Rural Okrug of Ust-Maysky District in the Sakha Republic, Russia, located 86 kilometers (53 mi) from Ust-Maya, the administrative center of the district, and 12 kilometers (7.5 mi) from Kyuptsy, the administrative center of the rural okrug. Its population as of the 2002 Census was 74.
