= Ust-Yudoma =

Ust-Yudoma Усть-Юдома
- Selo
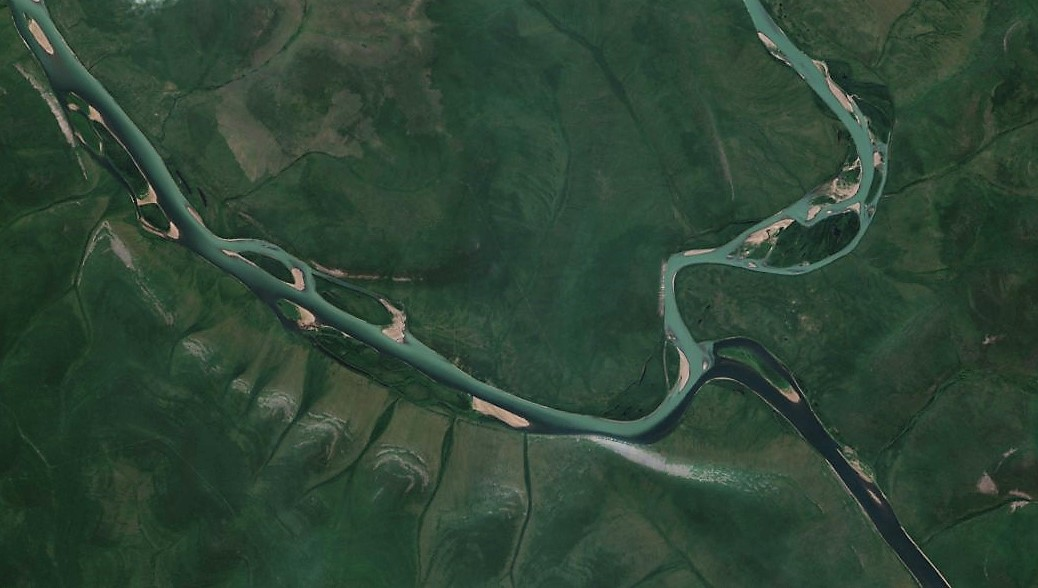
- Interactive map of Ust-Yudoma
- Location of Ust-Yudoma Ust-Yudoma (Sakha Republic)
- Coordinates: 59°09′N 135°12′E
- Country: Russia
- Federal subject: Sakha Republic
- Administrative district: Ust-Maysky District
- Urban okrugSelsoviet: Ust-Maya Urban Okrug

Population (2010 Census)
  - Total: 29
  - Estimate (2023): 23 (−20.7%)

Municipal status
  - Municipal district: Ust-Maysky Municipal District
  - Rural settlement: Ust-Maya Urban Settlement
- Time zone: UTC+
- OKTMO ID: 98654151106

Ust-Yudoma (Russian: Усть-Юдома; Yakut: Уус Үдүмэ, Uus Üdüme) is a rural locality (a selo), and one of two settlements in Ust-Maya Urban Okrug of Ust-Maysky District in the Sakha Republic, Russia, in addition to Ust-Maya, the administrative center of the Urban Okrug and the District, from which it is located 183 kilometers (114 mi) away. Its population as of the 2010 Census was 29, down from 49 recorded during the 2002 Census.

== Geography ==
Ust-Yudoma is located on the right bank of the Maya river, a little downstream from the confluence of the Yudoma.

== Climate ==
Ust-Yudoma has an extreme subarctic climate (Köppen climate classification: Dfd) with extremely cold winters and warm summers.

Climate data for Ust-Yudoma
Month	Jan	Feb	Mar	Apr	May	Jun	Jul	Aug	Sep	Oct	Nov	Dec	Year
Record high °C (°F)	0.0 (32.0)	0.0 (32.0)	11.0 (51.8)	22.2 (72.0)	36.0 (96.8)	36.1 (97.0)	37.2 (99.0)	37.7 (99.9)	29.2 (84.6)	19.0 (66.2)	6.0 (42.8)	0.0 (32.0)	37.7 (99.9)
Mean daily maximum °C (°F)	−34.3 (−29.7)	−26.0 (−14.8)	−9.7 (14.5)	3.2 (37.8)	13.6 (56.5)	22.6 (72.7)	25.2 (77.4)	21.8 (71.2)	12.6 (54.7)	−2.4 (27.7)	−21.8 (−7.2)	−33.8 (−28.8)	−2.3 (27.9)
Daily mean °C (°F)	−38.4 (−37.1)	−32.8 (−27.0)	−18.9 (−2.0)	−4.0 (24.8)	7.1 (44.8)	15.2 (59.4)	17.8 (64.0)	14.2 (57.6)	6.1 (43.0)	−7.3 (18.9)	−26.7 (−16.1)	−37.4 (−35.3)	−8.7 (16.3)
Mean daily minimum °C (°F)	−43.1 (−45.6)	−39.7 (−39.5)	−29.1 (−20.4)	−13.4 (7.9)	−0.7 (30.7)	6.3 (43.3)	9.4 (48.9)	6.5 (43.7)	−0.5 (31.1)	−13.2 (8.2)	−32.2 (−26.0)	−41.8 (−43.2)	−15.9 (3.4)
Record low °C (°F)	−58.0 (−72.4)	−57.7 (−71.9)	−48.0 (−54.4)	−38.9 (−38.0)	−15.0 (5.0)	−5.6 (21.9)	−1.8 (28.8)	−7.0 (19.4)	−17.7 (0.1)	−38.5 (−37.3)	−51.1 (−60.0)	−60.0 (−76.0)	−60.0 (−76.0)
Average precipitation mm (inches)	14.5 (0.57)	10.2 (0.40)	8.5 (0.33)	16.8 (0.66)	41.8 (1.65)	35.6 (1.40)	62.0 (2.44)	31.5 (1.24)	55.1 (2.17)	40.2 (1.58)	26.3 (1.04)	15.0 (0.59)	357.5 (14.07)
Average precipitation days	21.3	17.9	13.1	8.5	8.9	9.0	8.1	9.8	11.8	19.7	22.7	22.7	173.5
