= Neoplaca =

Scientific classification
- Domain: Eukaryota
- Kingdom: Fungi
- Division: Ascomycota
- Class: Lecanoromycetes
- Order: Teloschistales
- Family: Teloschistaceae
- Genus: Neoplaca; I.V.Frolov, Prokopiev & Konoreva (2023)
- Species: N. mirabilis

Binomial name
- Neoplaca mirabilis I.V.Frolov, Prokopiev & Konoreva (2023)

Single-species lichen genus

Neoplaca is a fungal genus in the family Teloschistaceae. It comprises the single species Neoplaca mirabilis, a ground-dwelling, crustose lichen. Both the genus and species were described in 2023 from specimens collected in Yakutia, Russia. The species is distinctive among its relatives for its whitish to greyish squamulose (scaly) thallus with contrasting citrine to orange-yellow blastidia, and for lacking the anthraquinone pigments typical of its family. Instead, it produces naphthopyran compounds, making it the first known case of these compounds in the Teloschistaceae. The species grows on base-rich soil on exposed south-facing siliceous outcrops, where it is locally common but known only from two localities along the Eastern Khandyga River in Yakutia.

== Taxonomy ==
Both the genus Neoplaca and its single species were described as new in 2023 by the lichenologists Ivan Frolov, Ilya Prokopiev, and Liudmila Konoreva. The genus name Neoplaca combines the prefix neo- (new) with -placa, referencing Caloplaca, a related genus in the Teloschistaceae. Molecular phylogenetics analysis places Neoplaca within the subfamily Caloplacoideae. It forms a distinct lineage that has a sister to 'Caloplaca conversa' auct. (not C. conversa sensu Krempelhuber) within a well-supported clade that includes the genera Kuettlingeria, Lendemeriella, and Pyrenodesmia. Despite its unusual chemistry and morphology for the family, DNA sequence data firmly establishes its position within the Teloschistaceae.

The genus is monotypic, containing only the type species Neoplaca mirabilis. The specific epithet mirabilis (Latin for "remarkable" or "wonderful") refers to the species' unique chemical and morphological characteristics within the Teloschistaceae. The holotype specimen (LE L-21846) was collected in Russia, Republic of Sakha (Yakutia), Tomponsky District, along the Eastern Khandyga river. The type collection includes DNA sequence data for three genetic markers: nrITS, nrLSU, and mtSSU.

== Description ==
Neoplaca mirabilis forms a distinctive crust-like growth (thallus) composed of scattered scale-like structures (squamules) that are typically whitish to greyish in colour, though occasionally showing a pale yellow tint. These squamules measure 1–4.5 mm across and 0.3–1 mm in thickness. As they develop, they begin as tiny granules about 0.1 mm wide, which then grow into small convex structures and finally mature into fully formed squamules. These mature squamules often display an intricate pattern of wide, winding folds on their surface that resembles brain tissue.

The squamules can grow individually or overlap like roof tiles. In some cases, they merge to form larger, patterned patches up to 1 cm across. A distinctive feature of the species is its method of vegetative reproduction: it produces small, round structures called blastidia along the edges of the squamules. These blastidia are citrine to orange-yellow in colour, creating a marked contrast with the paler squamules. Mature squamules are often surrounded by numerous tiny new growths, which likely develop from these blastidia, suggesting the species reproduces effectively through these structures. No other reproductive structures (apothecia or pycnidia) have been observed.

When viewed in cross-section, N. mirabilis reveals several distinct layers. The outer protective layer (cortex) is 33–40 μm thick and consists of two distinct parts: a lower colourless layer and an upper layer containing cells with brown pigment. A white, powdery coating (pruina) covers the cortex. Below the cortex lies a layer of algal cells (photobiont), 5583 μm thick, while the inner layer (medulla) is white and loosely structured, ranging from 0.2–0.8 mm thick.

Unlike most members of its family, which produce orange-red pigments called anthraquinones, N. mirabilis contains different chemical compounds. It produces simonyellin as its major metabolite, with trace amounts of consimonyellin, as well as an unidentified brown pigment with some characteristics similar to melanin. These pigments are found inside the cells rather than on their surface, which is unusual for lichens in this family. When tested with potassium hydroxide solution (K), the lichen turns orange-brown, and with para-phenylenediamine (P), it briefly turns yellow.

== Habitat and distribution ==
Neoplaca mirabilis is known only from two nearby localities in the Republic of Sakha (Yakutia) in eastern Siberia, Russia. Both sites are situated along the Eastern Khandyga river, where the species grows at elevations between 550 and 850 metres above sea level.

The species grows on base-rich soil that covers exposed south-facing siliceous rock outcrops. These outcrops are located along small brooks that cut through the landscape. While the surrounding valley slopes are forested with Larix gmelinii (Dahurian larch), the brook valleys themselves remain treeless, likely due to periodic flooding that prevents tree establishment. In its limited known habitat, N. mirabilis is relatively common and grows alongside other soil-dwelling lichens, including species from the genera Collema, Endocarpon, Leptogium, and Toninia.
