= Zvyozdochka, Sakha Republic =

Zvyozdochka Звёздочка
- Urban-type settlement

Other transcription(s)
  - Yakut: Звёздочка
- Interactive map of Zvyozdochka
- Location of Zvyozdochka Zvyozdochka (Sakha Republic)
- Coordinates: 60°29′N 137°40′E
- Country: Russia
- Federal subject: Sakha Republic
- Administrative district: Ust-Maysky District
- SettlementSelsoviet: Settlement of Zvyozdochka
- Founded: 1961
- Urban-type settlement status since: 1987

Population (2010 Census)
  - Total: 408
  - Estimate (2023): 268 (−34.3%)

Administrative status
  - Capital of: Settlement of Zvyozdochka

Municipal status
  - Municipal district: Ust-Maysky Municipal District
  - Urban settlement: Zvyozdochka Urban Settlement
  - Capital of: Zvyozdochka Urban Settlement
- Time zone: UTC+
- Postal code: 678627
- OKTMO ID: 98654156051

Zvyozdochka population
- 2010 Census: 408
- 2002 Census: 566
- 1989 Census: 662

Zvyozdochka (Russian: Звёздочка; Yakut: Звёздочка, romanized: Zvyozdoçka, literally meaning little star) is an urban locality (an urban-type settlement) in Ust-Maysky District of the Sakha Republic, Russia, located 267 kilometers (166 mi) from Ust-Maya, the administrative center of the district. As of the 2010 Census, its population was 408.

== History ==
Urban-type settlement status was granted to it in 1987.

== Administrative and municipal status ==
Within the framework of administrative divisions, the urban-type settlement of Zvyozdochka is incorporated within Ust-Maysky District as the Settlement of Zvyozdochka. As a municipal division, the Settlement of Zvyozdochka is incorporated within Ust-Maysky Municipal District as Zvyozdochka Urban Settlement.
