= Nezhdaninskoye =

Former selo in Tomponsky District, Russia

Coordinates: 62°30′N 139°3′E

Nezhdaninskoye (Russian: Нежда́нинское) was a rural locality (a selo) in Tomponsky District of the Sakha Republic, Russia, which existed until March 2, 2000.

Following the discovery and exploration of the Nezhdaninskoye gold deposit, the village was founded in order to begin mining operations.

== Geography ==
The village is located in a narrow valley by river Tyry.
