= Yudoma-Maya Highlands =

- Юдомо-Майское нагорье Юдома-Маайа хаптал хайалаах сиринэн
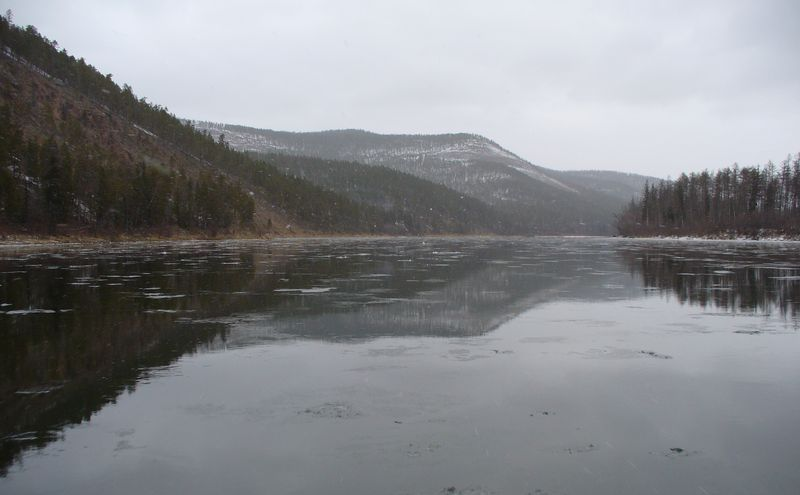
- View of the Maya River in mid October

Highest point
- Peak: Shpil Tarbagannakh
- Elevation: 2,213 m (7,260 ft)
- Coordinates: 61°09′18″N 138°27′04″E

Dimensions
- Length: 500 km (310 mi)
- Width: 200 km (120 mi)

Geography
- Location within Far Eastern Federal District
- Country: Russia
- Federal subject: Sakha Republic; Khabarovsk Krai
- Range coordinates: 59°0′N 136°0′E
- Parent range: South Siberian System

Geology
- Rock age: Late Ordovician
- Rock type(s): Sandstone, clay, shale

The Yudoma-Maya Highlands (Russian: Юдомо-Майское нагорье, romanized: Yudomo-Maiskoye Nagorye; Yakut: Юдома-Маайа хаптал хайалаах сиринэн, romanized: Yudoma-Maaya xaptal xayalaax sirinen) are a mountainous area in the Sakha Republic and Khabarovsk Krai, Far Eastern Federal District, Russia.

The settlement of Allakh-Yun is located in the area of the highlands on the right bank of the Allakh-Yun River.

== History ==
The area of the Yudoma-Maya and the Aldan highlands, between the basins of the Aldan River and the Yudoma, was uncharted territory well until the 1930s. It was first surveyed in 1934 by geologist Yuri Bilibin (1901—1952) together with mining engineer Evgeny Bobin (1897—1941) in the course of an expedition sent by the government of the USSR. Bilibin and Bobin made a thorough topographic survey of the mountainous regions leading separate research parties. They described the highlands as "a disordered jumble of round hills with soft outlines".

== Geography ==
The Yudoma-Maya Highlands lie at the southern end of the Sakha Republic and the western limits of Khabarovsk Krai. They are named after the upper basin of the Maya River, a tributary of the Aldan, and the Yudoma, one of the biggest tributaries of the Maya, The highland area is bound to the west by the Skalisty Range and the Sette-Daban subranges of the Verkhoyansk Range, and to the north by the Suntar-Khayata Range. The highlands reach the valley of the Okhota River to the east, and to the south they are limited by the northern end of the Dzhugdzhur Range. The average heights range between 800 metres (2,600 ft) and 1,200 metres (3,900 ft), the heights increasing towards the south.

The highest point is 2,213 meters (7,260 ft) high Shpil Tarbagannakh (Шпиль-Тарбаганнах).

=== Subranges and peaks ===
Northern section

- Kutelsky Range, highest point 1,637 metres (5,371 ft)
- Uemlyakhskі Goltsi, 2,132 metres (6,995 ft) (Уемляхські Гольцы)
- Tarbaganakhskі Goltsi, 2,167 metres (7,110 ft) (Тарбаганахські Гольцы)

Southern section

- Chelat Range, highest point 1,510 metres (4,950 ft)
- Upper Maya Massif, highest point 1,563 metres (5,128 ft)
- Maya Massif, highest point 1,364 metres (4,475 ft)

== Climate ==
The highlands have a harsh continental climate. January temperatures range from −34 °C (−29 °F) to −43 °C (−45 °F). The coldest temperatures recorded reach between −58 °C (−72 °F) and −62 °C (−80 °F). In summer the average July temperature in the valleys does not exceed 18 °C (64 °F). Precipitation is between 250 millimeters (9.8 in) and 800 millimeters (31 in) per year. Most of the yearly precipitation falls in the second half of summer in the form of rain.

== Flora ==
Large swathes of the highlands are covered by taiga up to elevations between 1,100 metres (3,600 ft) and 1,300 metres (4,300 ft). The areas adjacent to the valleys are covered with larch and pine forests, especially in the southern region. Above 500 metres (1,600 ft) there is spruce and birch taiga up to a height of 1,000 metres (3,300 ft). In the northern parts of the highlands there are thickets of dwarf cedar and mountain tundra above 1,200 metres (3,900 ft).
