= Sonechny =

Sonechny (Belarusian: Сонечны) or Solnechny (Russian: Солнечный) may refer to the following places in Belarus:

- be:Сонечны (Пружанскі раён), Brest region
- be:Сонечны (Гомель), Gomel region
- be:Сонечны (Мінскі раён), Minsk region
- be:Сонечны (Полацкі раён), Vitebsk region

== See also ==
- Solnechny, Russian-language name
- Borovaya
- Borowa
