= Solnechny =

Solnechny (masculine), Solnechnaya (feminine), or Solnechnoye (neuter) may refer to:

- Solnechny District, a district of Khabarovsk Krai, Russia
- Solnechny Urban Okrug, several municipal urban okrugs in Russia
- Solnechny Urban Settlement, several municipal urban settlements in Russia
- Solnechny (inhabited locality) (Solnechnaya, Solnechnoye), several inhabited localities in Russia
- Solnechny Bay, Bolshevik Island, Severnaya Zemlya
- Solnechny (Pavlodar Region), Kazakhstan
- Sonechny, places in Belarus named "Solnechly" in Russia

== See also ==
- Soniachna Dolyna (or Solnechnaya Dolina), a village in Crimea
