= Ulakhan-Bom =

Range of mountains in North-eastern Russia

Ulakhan-Bom Улахан-Бом
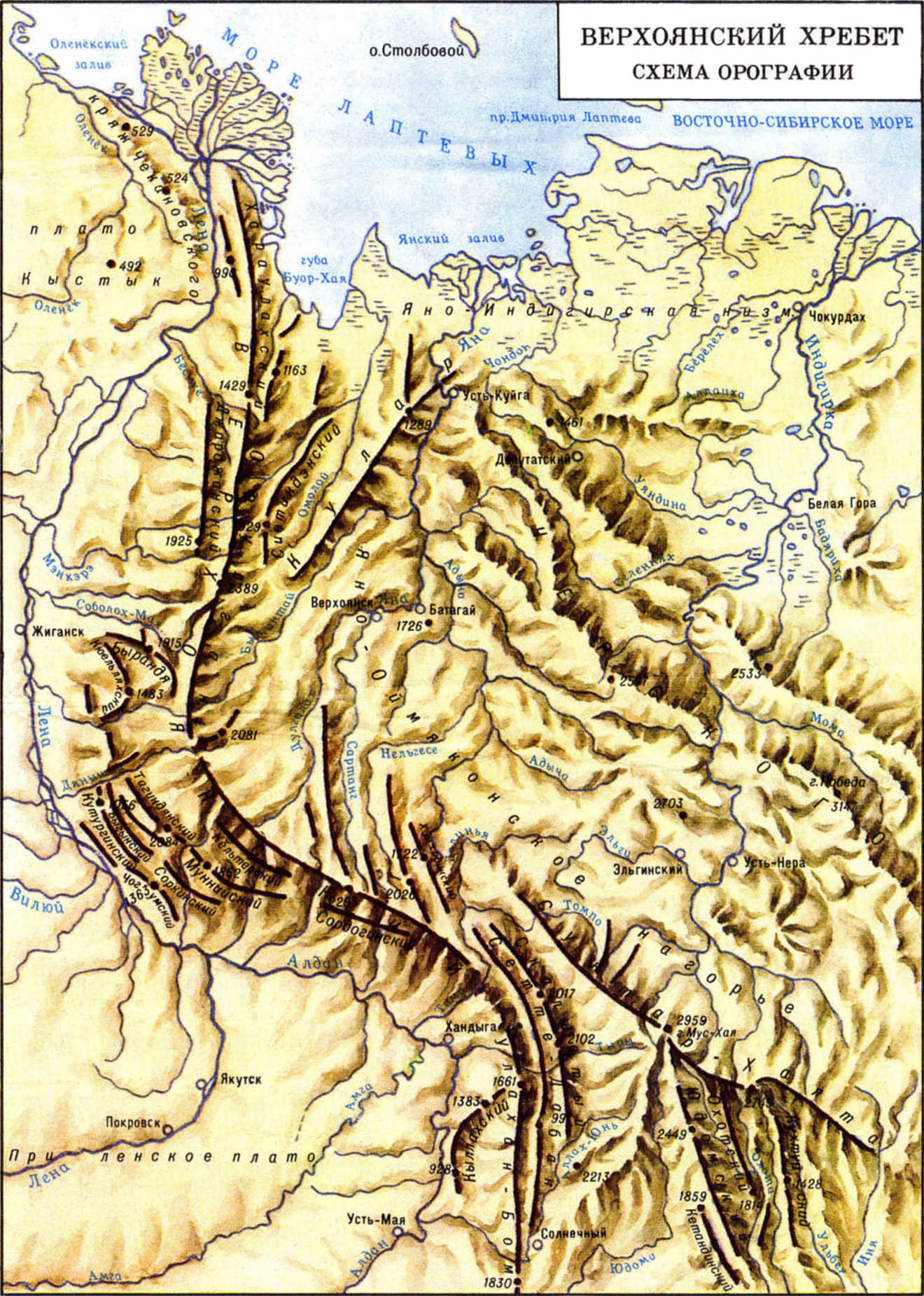
- The Verkhoyansk Range, including the Sette-Daban and Suntar-Khayata

Highest point
- Peak: Unnamed
- Elevation: 1,830 m (6,000 ft)

Dimensions
- Length: 400 km (250 mi) NNW/SSE

Geography
- Location within Sakha Republic
- Location: Sakha Republic (Yakutia), Russian Far East
- Range coordinates: 61°N 137°E
- Parent range: Verkhoyansk Range; East Siberian System

Geology
- Orogeny: Alpine orogeny
- Rock type(s): Sandstone, limestone

The Ulakhan-Bom (Russian: Улахан-Бом; Yakut: Улахан Бом, meaning "Big Obstacle") is a range of mountains in far North-eastern Russia, a southern prolongation of the Verkhoyansk Range, part of the East Siberian System. Administratively the mountain chain belongs to the Sakha Republic.

The urban locality of Solnechny is located near the slopes of the range, by the Allakh-Yun River.

== Geography ==
The Ulakhan-Bom stretches roughly from north to south for about 400 kilometres (250 mi) to the west of the Sette-Daban, forming a group of three parallel ranges, together with the Skalisty Range further to the east. It is bound in the north by the Tompo River, which separates it from the Verkhoyansk Range proper. To the west it is bound by the wide Aldan River valley and to the south by the Yudoma River. The Tyry river cuts across the northern section of the Ulakhan-Bom. The Khanda river cuts across the range further south. The smaller Kyllakh Range rises west of the Khanda valley, in the southwestern side of the Ulakhan-Bom, between the Aldan and the southern section of its western slopes. The highest point of the mountain chain is an unnamed 1,830 metres (6,000 ft) high peak rising above the left bank of the Allakh-Yun river.

== Flora ==
The slopes of the range are mostly bare, but covered by larch taiga in slopes just above valleys, as well as birch in slopes facing the Aldan. Most of the river valleys are swampy with widespread moss growth. Thickets of Siberian pine and mountain tundra grow at elevations above 1,000 metres (3,300 ft).

== See also ==
- List of mountains and hills of Russia
