= Kyllakh Range =

Range of mountains in North-eastern Russia

Kyllakh Range Кыыллаах
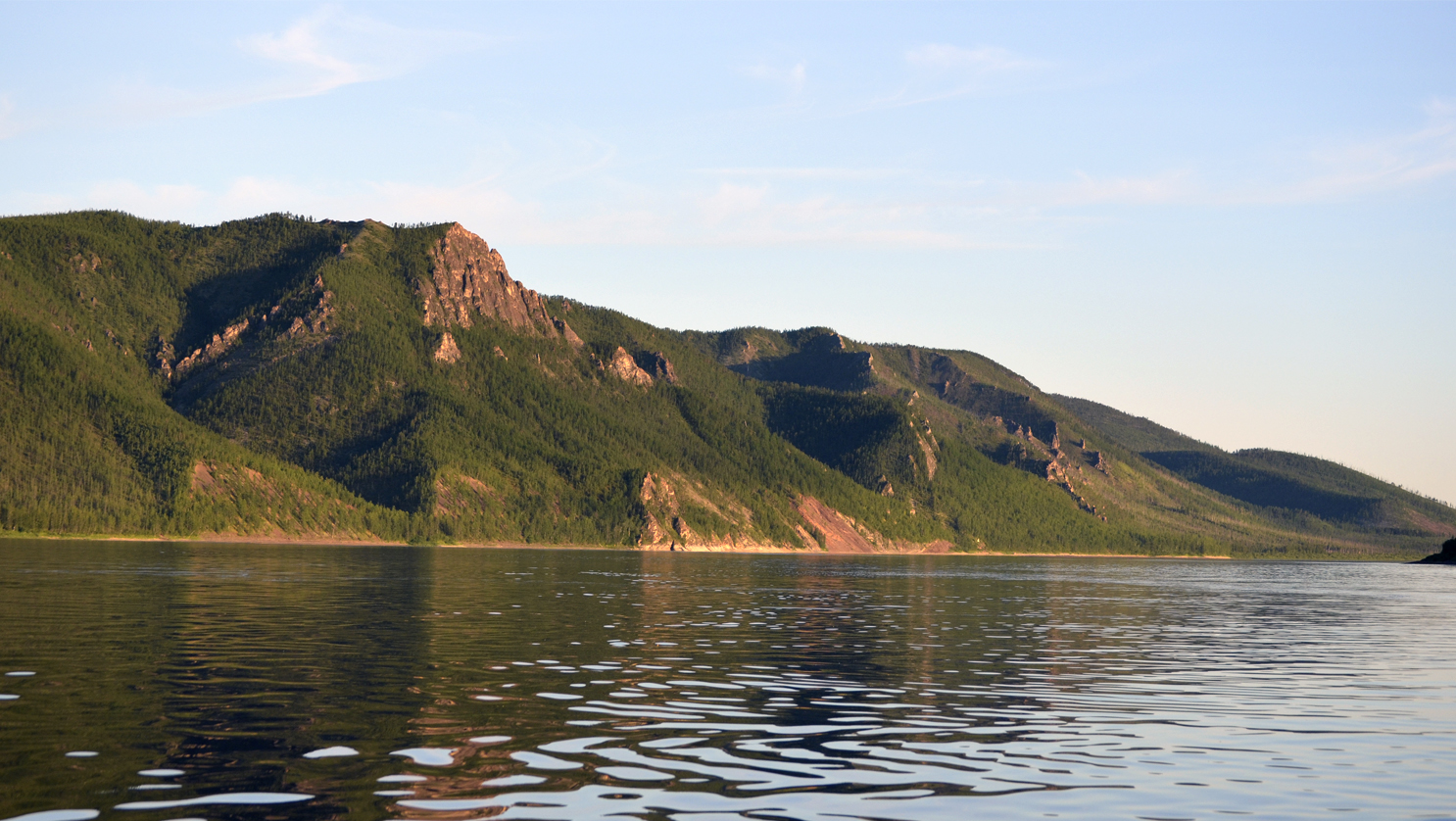
- Western side of the Kyllakh Range rising above the right bank of the Aldan

Highest point
- Peak: Unnamed
- Elevation: 901 m (2,956 ft)

Dimensions
- Length: 100 km (62 mi) N/S
- Width: 30 km (19 mi) E/W

Geography
- Location within Sakha Republic
- Location: Sakha Republic (Yakutia), Russian Far East
- Range coordinates: 61°06′N 135°47′E
- Parent range: Verkhoyansk Range; East Siberian System

Geology
- Orogeny: Alpine orogeny
- Rock type(s): Sandstone, limestone

Climbing
- Easiest route: From Eldikan

The Kyllakh Range (Russian: Кыллахский хребет; Yakut: Кыыллаах) is a range of mountains in the Russian Federation. Administratively the mountain chain belongs to the Sakha Republic. It is the smallest of the ranges which are part of the southern prolongation of the Verkhoyansk Range, East Siberian System.

== Geography ==
The Kyllakh Range stretches roughly from north to south for about 100 kilometres (62 mi) to the southwest of the Ulakhan-Bom, one of the three longer parallel ranges that form a group to the east. It is bound in the north by the Khanda river. To the west it is limited by the banks of the Aldan River and to the south by the Allakh-Yun river. The highest point of the mountain chain is an unnamed 901 metres (2,956 ft) high summit.

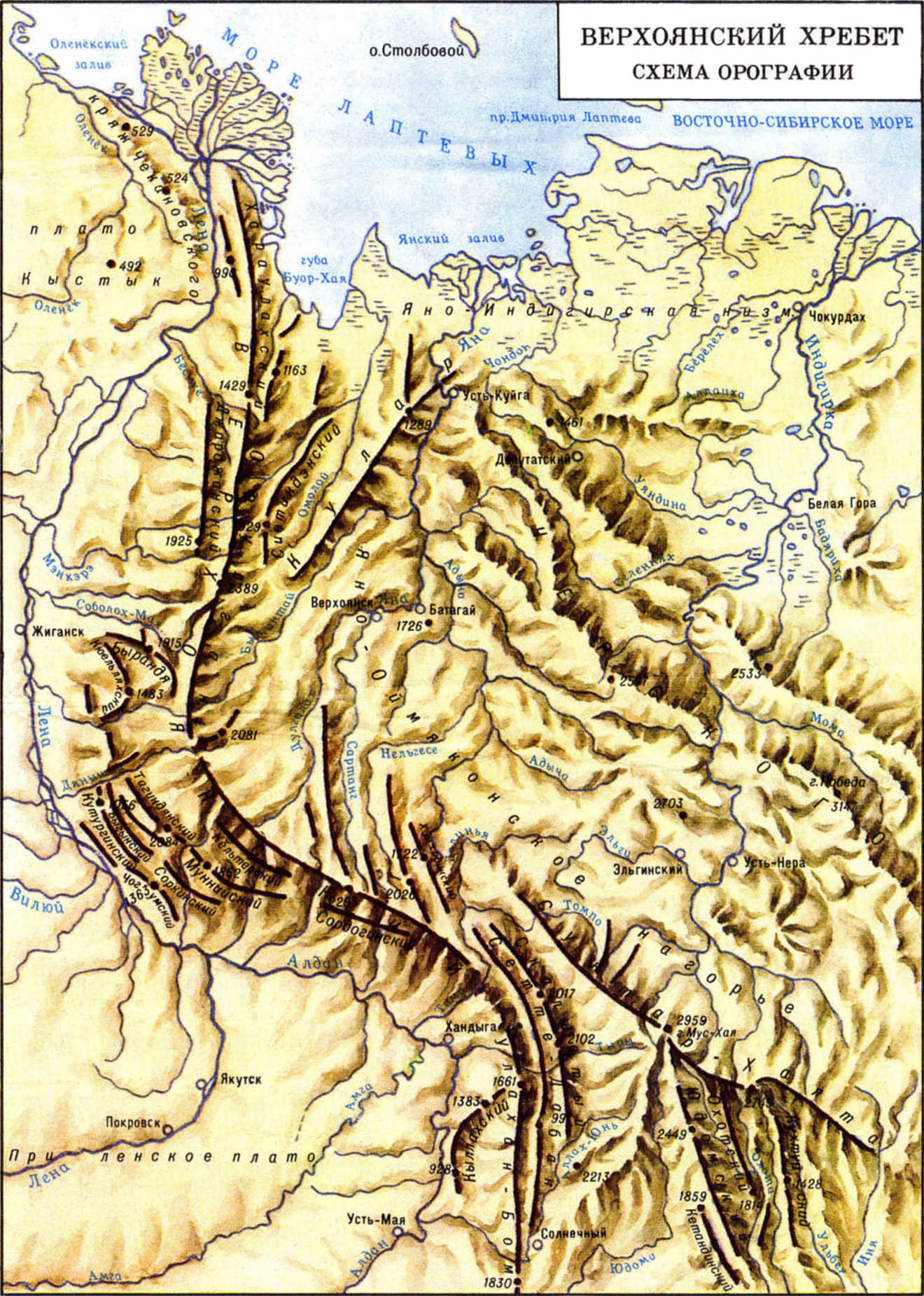
Map of the Verkhoyansk Range, with the Kyllakh range at the southwestern end.

== Flora ==
The slopes of the range are largely bare, but may be covered by larch taiga in slopes just above valleys, as well as birch in slopes facing the Aldan. Most of the river valleys are swampy with widespread moss growth.

== See also ==
- List of mountains and hills of Russia
