= Tyry =

Tyry Тырыы
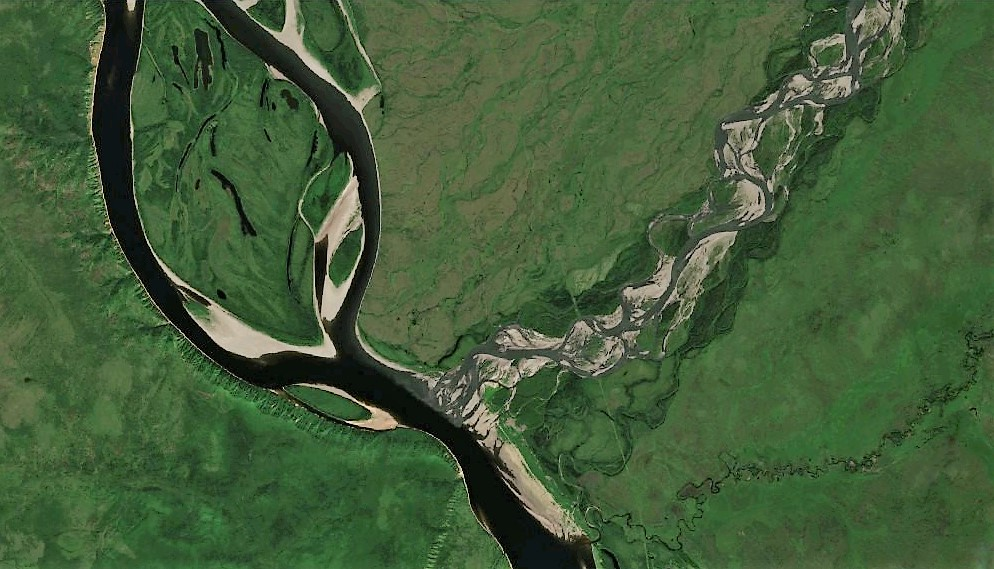
- Confluence of the Tyry and the Aldan Sentinel-2 image

- Mouth location in Yakutia, Russia

Location
- Country: Russian Federation

Physical characteristics
- Source: Suntar-Khayata
  - coordinates: 62°25′12″N 140°32′24″E
- Mouth: Aldan River
  - coordinates: 62°21′36″N 135°48′0″E
- Length: 327 km (203 mi)
- Basin size: 14,000 km^{2} (5,400 sq mi)
- Discharge
  - average: 17.2 m^{3}/s (610 cu ft/s)

Basin features
- Progression: Aldan→ Lena→ Laptev Sea

The Tyry (Russian: Тыры; Yakut: Тырыы, Tırıı) is a river in the Sakha Republic (Yakutia), Russia, a right tributary of the Aldan, part of the Lena basin. It has a length of 327 kilometres (203 mi), a drainage basin area of 14,000 square kilometres (5,400 mi^{2}) and is the 8th longest tributary of the Aldan.

Formerly there were mining settlements in the river valley, operating the coal and other deposits of the river basin, such as Nezhdaninskoye. Nowadays the nearest permanently inhabited place in the area of the Tyry is Khandyga of Tompo District to the north of the river's mouth. The Tyry is a known destination for rafting and kayaking, as well as fishing.

== Course ==
The Tyry has its sources in the southern slopes of the Suntar-Khayata Range. In the upper section of its course the river flows through a narrow valley across mountainous terrain, heading roughly southwestwards and cutting across the Skalisty Range and the Sette Daban, where its valley widens and the river divides into branches. The river turns then to the WNW and cuts across the northern section of the Ulakhan-Bom. After the Tyry exits the mountain area it enters a wide floodplain, dividing into many channels and making a wide bend to the southwest. Finally if meets the right bank of the Aldan River, upstream from the mouth of the Eastern Khandyga, 492 km (306 mi) from the confluence of the Aldan with the Lena River.

=== Tributaries ===
The main tributaries of the Tyry are the 185 km (115 mi) long Khalya (Халыйа), the 83 km (52 mi) long Dogulchan (Долгучаан) and the 33 km (21 mi) long Natalya (Наталья) on the left, and the 79 km (49 mi) long Dyby (Дыбыы) on the right. The river freezes before mid October and stays frozen until mid May.

== Fauna ==
Among the fishes present in the river and its tributaries are taimen, grayling, perch and pike, among other species.

== See also ==
- List of rivers of Russia
