= Belkachi =

Belkachi Белькачи
- Selo
- Interactive map of Belkachi
- Location of Belkachi Belkachi (Sakha Republic)
- Coordinates: 59°09′N 131°55′E
- Country: Russia
- Federal subject: Sakha Republic
- Administrative district: Ust-Maysky District
- Rural okrugSelsoviet: Belkachi Village
- Elevation: 182 m (597 ft)

Population (2010 Census)
  - Total: 179
  - Estimate (2021): 171 (−4.5%)

Administrative status
  - Capital of: Belkachi Village

Municipal status
  - Municipal district: Ust-Maysky Municipal District
  - Rural settlement: Belkachi Rural Settlement
  - Capital of: Belkachi Rural Settlement
- Time zone: UTC+
- Postal code: 678673
- OKTMO ID: 98654405101

Belkachi (Russian: Белькачи) is a rural locality (a selo), the only inhabited locality, and the administrative center of Belkachi Village in Ust-Maysky District of the Sakha Republic, Russia, located 131 kilometers (81 mi) from Ust-Maya, the administrative center of the district. Its population as of the 2010 Census was 179, down from 212 recorded during the 2002 Census.
