= Solnechny Urban Okrug =

Location of Krasnoyarsk Krai in Russia

Location of Tver Oblast in Russia

Solnechny Urban Okrug is the name of several municipal formations in Russia. The following administrative divisions are incorporated as such:

- Closed Administrative-Territorial Formation of Solnechny, Krasnoyarsk Krai
- Closed Administrative-Territorial Formation of Solnechny, Tver Oblast

== See also ==
- Solnechny
