= Allakh-Yun (river) =

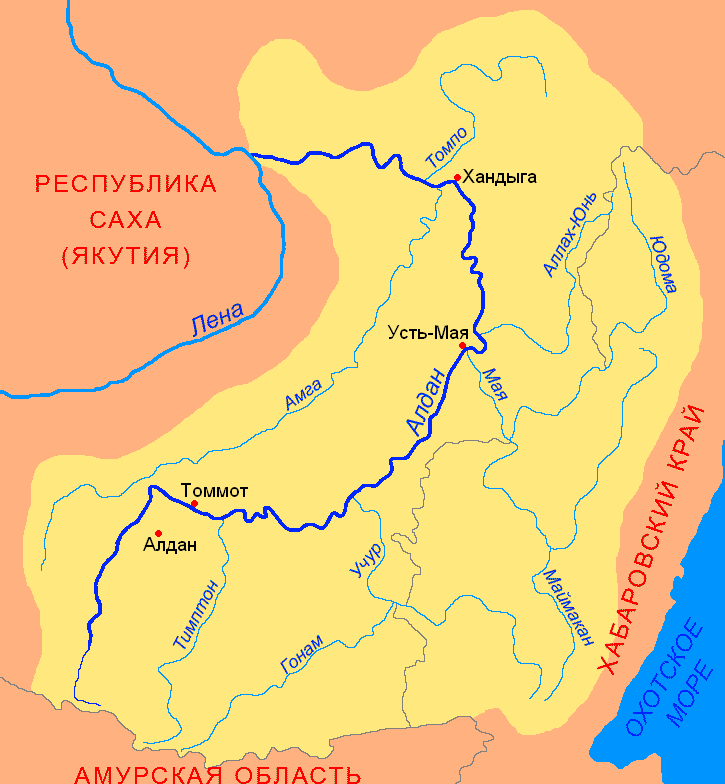
- Basin of the Aldan

- Mouth location in Yakutia, Russia

Location
- Country: Russia

Physical characteristics
- Source
  - coordinates: 61°50′25″N 139°58′01″E
- Mouth: Aldan
  - coordinates: 60°36′12″N 134°57′22″E
- Length: 586 km (364 mi)
- Basin size: 24,200 km^{2} (9,300 sq mi)

Basin features
- Progression: Aldan→ Lena→ Laptev Sea

The Allakh-Yun (Russian: Аллах-Юнь, Yakut: Ааллаах Үүн, Aallaax Üün) is a river in Sakha Republic and Khabarovsk Krai, Russia. It is a right tributary of the Aldan. It is 586 kilometres (364 mi) long, and has a drainage basin of 24,200 square kilometres (9,300 sq mi).

== Geography ==
The Allakh-Yun arises at an elevation of around 1,070 metres (3,510 ft) as the outflow from the mountain lake Amparyndzha, in the south-eastern Verkhoyansk Range. It flows generally in a south-westerly direction through a narrow valley along the Yudoma-Maya Highlands, to the east of the Sette-Daban range. The river cuts through the Ulakhan-Bom Ridge, before flowing into the Aldan by the southern end of the Kyllakh Range, at an elevation of 146 metres (479 ft), approximately 20 kilometres (12 mi) from the settlement of Eldikan. At its mouth, the Allakh-Yun is about 150 metres (490 ft) wide and 2 metres (7 ft) deep.

The Allakh-Yun freezes over from mid-October until late May.

== Local economy and infrastructure ==
The river is navigable on its lower and middle sections. The surrounding area is very sparsely settled, with the few settlements that do exist on the river, such as Allakh-Yun, Zvyodochka and Solnechny, having originated as gold-mining centres in the 1930s. With the economic crisis arising after the breakup of the Soviet Union and subsequent cessation of mining activities, the area's population dropped from over 8,000 in 1989 to around 1,500 in 2010.

The 300-kilometre (190 mi) long unsealed road connecting Eldikan with Yugoryonok on the Yudoma River crosses the Allakh-Yun on a concrete bridge north of Solnechny. This bridge has been repeatedly destroyed or damaged by floods, most recently in 2008.

== See also ==
- List of rivers of Russia
