= Yuri Alexandrovich Bilibin =

Yuri Bilibin
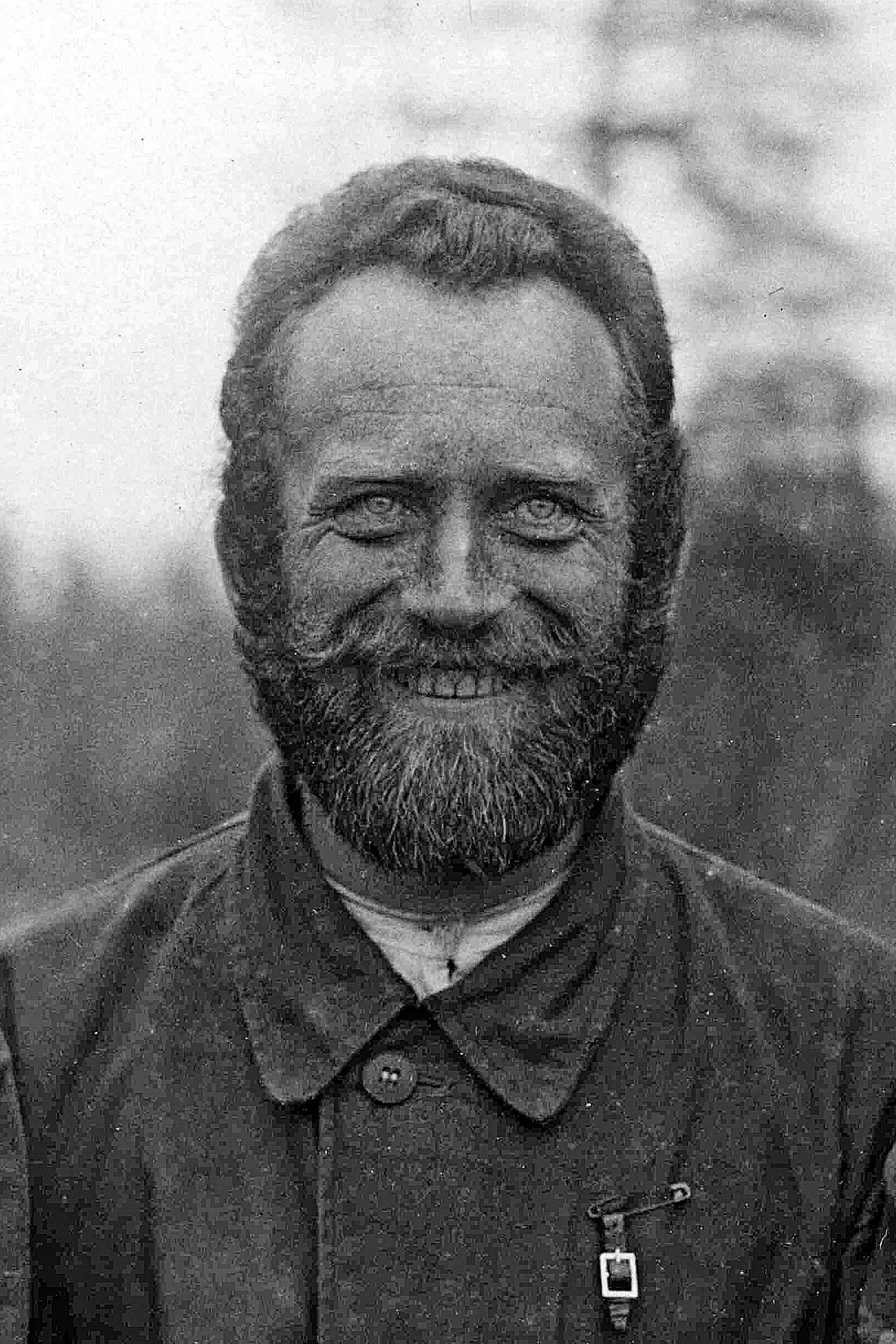
- Born: 19 May 1901; Rostov
- Died: 4 May 1952 (aged 50); Leningrad
- Awards: Medal "For Valiant Labour in the Great Patriotic War 1941–1945"; Stalin Prize (1946)

Yuri Alexandrovich Bilibin (Russian: Ю́рий Алекса́ндрович Били́бин; 19 May 1901 – 4 May 1952) was a Soviet geologist.

== Biography ==
Between 1919 and 1921 he served in the Red Army. In 1926 he graduated from the Leningrad Mining Institute. He later became a member of the Soviet Academy of Sciences and in 1946 was awarded the Stalin Prize for his contribution in the discovery of gold deposits in northeast Siberia. Together with mining engineer Evgeny Bobin (1897–1941), Bilibin surveyed and charted the last unmapped areas of continental USSR, the Sette-Daban and the Yudoma-Maya and Aldan highlands, in the course of an expedition sent by the Soviet government in 1934.

Bilibin wrote more than 60 scientific papers, including the authoritative Fundamentals of placer geology (Основы геологии россыпей, 1938). He died in Leningrad in 1952 from an intracerebral hemorrhage and was buried at the Volkovo Cemetery in the Literary Bridges section.

== Honors ==
Bilibino town and Bilibino District in Chukotka Autonomous Okrug, as well as the mineral Bilibinskite, were named in his honor. He also was awarded the Medal "For Valiant Labour in the Great Patriotic War 1941–1945", as well as the Stalin Prize in the I degree, for his exploration and discovery of new gold deposits in the Far East of the USSR.

== See also ==
- List of minerals named after people
