= Petropavlovsk, Sakha Republic =

Petropavlovsk Петропавловск
- Selo
- Interactive map of Petropavlovsk
- Location of Petropavlovsk Petropavlovsk (Sakha Republic)
- Coordinates: 60°22′N 134°28′E
- Country: Russia
- Federal subject: Sakha Republic
- Administrative district: Ust-Maysky District
- Rural okrugSelsoviet: Petropavlovsky Rural Okrug
- Founded: 1871

Population
  - Estimate (2002): 944 )

Administrative status
  - Capital of: Petropavlovsky Rural Okrug

Municipal status
  - Municipal district: Ust-Maysky Municipal District
  - Rural settlement: Petropavlovsky Rural Settlement
  - Capital of: Petropavlovsky Rural Settlement
- Time zone: UTC+
- Postal code: 678631
- OKTMO ID: 98654420101

Petropavlovsk (Russian: Петропа́вловск) is a rural locality (a selo) and the administrative center of Petropavlovsky Rural Okrug in Ust-Maysky District of the Sakha Republic, Russia, located 8 kilometers (5.0 mi) from Ust-Maya, the administrative center of the district. Its population as of the 2002 Census was 944.
