= Tenkeli =

Tenkeli Тенкели
- Urban-type settlement
- Interactive map of Tenkeli
- Location of Tenkeli Tenkeli (Sakha Republic)
- Coordinates: 70°11′N 140°46′E
- Country: Russia
- Federal subject: Sakha Republic
- Administrative district: Ust-Yansky District
- SettlementSelsoviet: Deputatsky
- Founded: 1960
- Urban-type settlement status since: 1973

Population (2010 Census)
  - Total: 0
  - Estimate (1989): 2,877 )

Administrative status
  - Capital of: Ust-Yansky District, Settlement of Deputatsky

Municipal status
  - Municipal district: Ust-Yansky Municipal District
  - Urban settlement: Deputatsky Urban Settlement
  - Capital of: Ust-Yansky Municipal District, Deputatsky Urban Settlement

Tenkeli (Russian: Тенкели) is an urban-type settlement in the Sakha Republic, Russia. It was created in the 1960s as a mining settlement exploiting tin deposits. In 1973 the village was granted urban locality status. Until 1989 it had a population of about 3 000 inhabitants but in 1995 mining in the area was deemed unprofitable and the settlement was abandoned.
