= Eastern Khandyga =

Eastern Khandyga Восточная Хандыга / Илиҥҥи Хаандыга
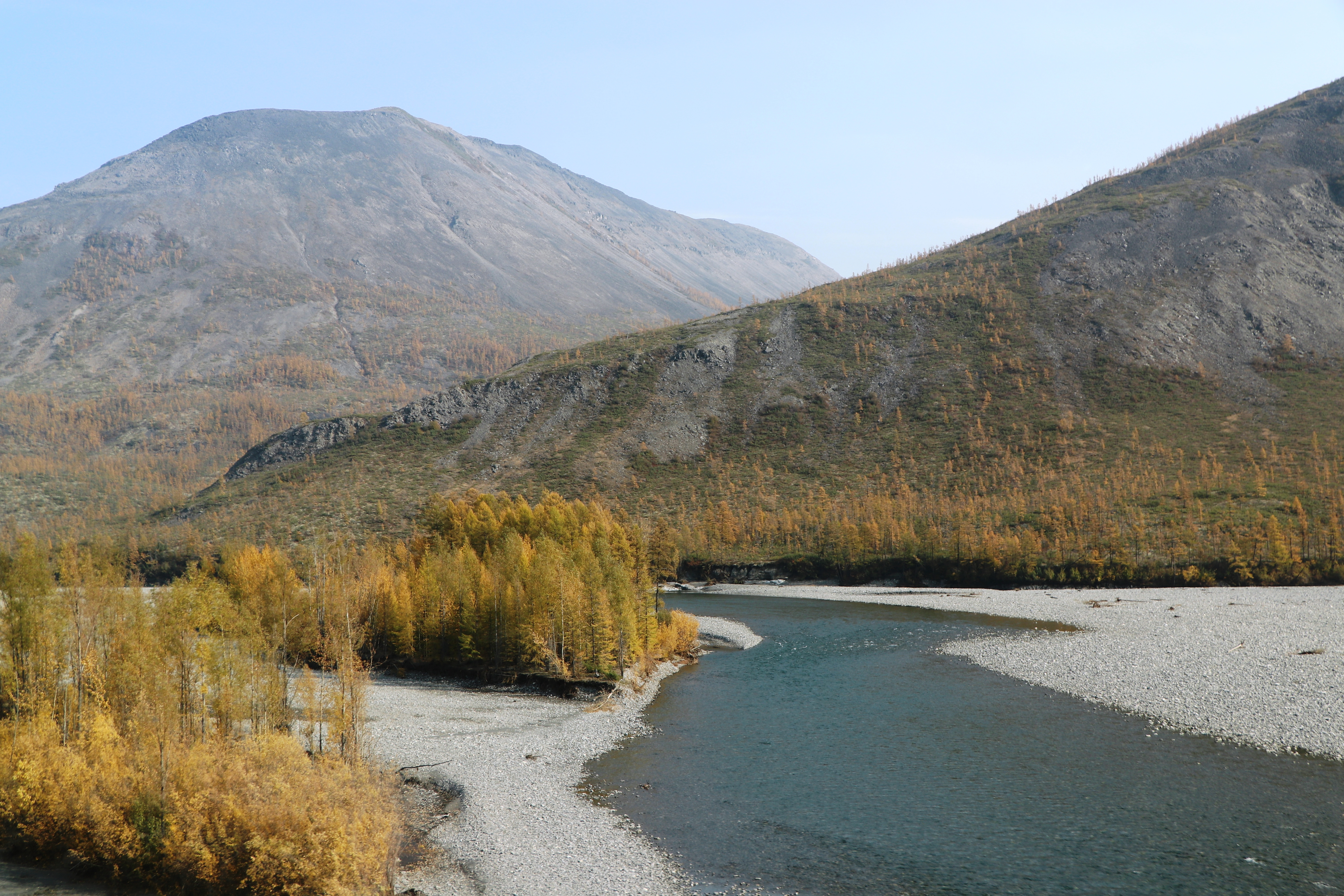
- Panorama of the river

- Mouth location in Yakutia, Russia

Location
- Country: Russian Federation

Physical characteristics
- Source: Suntar-Khayata
  - coordinates: 62°56′10″N 139°14′04″E
- Mouth: Aldan River
  - coordinates: 62°31′41″N 135°36′27″E
  - elevation: 115 m (377 ft)
- Length: 290 km (180 mi)
- Basin size: 9,950 km^{2} (3,840 sq mi)
- Discharge
  - average: 27.3 m^{3}/s (960 cu ft/s)

Basin features
- Progression: Aldan→ Lena→ Laptev Sea

The Eastern Khandyga (Russian: Восточная Хандыга; Yakut: Илиҥҥи Хаандыга, romanized: İliññi Xaandıga) is a river in Tompo District, Yakutia (Sakha Republic), Russian Federation, a right tributary of the Aldan, part of the Lena basin. It has a length of 290 kilometres (180 mi) and a drainage basin area of 9,950 square kilometres (3,840 mi^{2}).

Tyoply Klyuch village is located by the banks of the river. The nearest relatively larger inhabited place in the area is Khandyga, to the north of the river's mouth. There is a 389 metres (1,276 ft) long bridge of the R504 Kolyma Highway across the Eastern Khandyga.

== Course ==
The Eastern Khandyga has its sources in the western section of the Suntar-Khayata Range. The river heads roughly westwards and cuts across the Skalisty Range and the Sette Daban. After the river exits the mountain area it enters a wide floodplain, dividing into many channels and flowing roughly southwestwards. Finally if meets the right bank of the Aldan River a little downstream from the mouth of the Tyry, 467 km (290 mi) from the confluence of the Aldan with the Lena River.

=== Tributaries ===
The main tributaries of the Eastern Khandyga are the 113 km (70 mi) long Onyollo (Өнньөлө) and the 94 km (58 mi) long Sakkyryr (Саккырыыр) on the left. The river freezes before mid October and stays frozen until mid May. There are about 300 lakes in the river basin, as well as 30 icings with a total area of 42 km^{2} (16 sq mi).

== Paleontology ==
Fossils of ammonites of the genus Otoceras were found in the Induan (Early Triassic) deposits in the upper reaches of this river.

== Fauna ==
The slopes of the ranges in the upper reaches of the river provide a habitat for the Siberian Apollo butterfly, endemic to the mountains of the Yana — Kolyma watershed.

== See also ==
- List of rivers of Russia
