= Solnechny, Sakha Republic =

Solnechny Солнечный
- Urban-type settlement

Other transcription(s)
  - Yakut: Солнечнай
- Interactive map of Solnechny
- Location of Solnechny Solnechny (Sakha Republic)
- Coordinates: 60°18′N 137°33′E
- Country: Russia
- Federal subject: Sakha Republic
- Administrative district: Ust-Maysky District
- SettlementSelsoviet: Solnechny
- Founded: 1964
- Urban-type settlement status since: 1972

Population (2010 Census)
  - Total: 1,034
  - Estimate (2023): 700 (−32.3%)

Administrative status
  - Capital of: Settlement of Solnechny

Municipal status
  - Municipal district: Ust-Maysky Municipal District
  - Urban settlement: Solnechny Urban Settlement
  - Capital of: Solnechny Urban Settlement
- Time zone: UTC+
- Postal code: 678635
- OKTMO ID: 98654158051

Solnechny population
- 2010 Census: 1,034
- 2002 Census: 1,272
- 1989 Census: 2,193
- 1979 Census: 1,360

Solnechny (Russian: Со́лнечный; Yakut: Солнечнай, romanized: Solneçnay) is an urban locality (an urban-type settlement) in Ust-Maysky District of the Sakha Republic, Russia, located 266 kilometers (165 mi) from Ust-Maya, the administrative center of the district. As of the 2010 Census, its population was 1,034. It is located near the slopes of the Ulakhan-Bom range.

== History ==
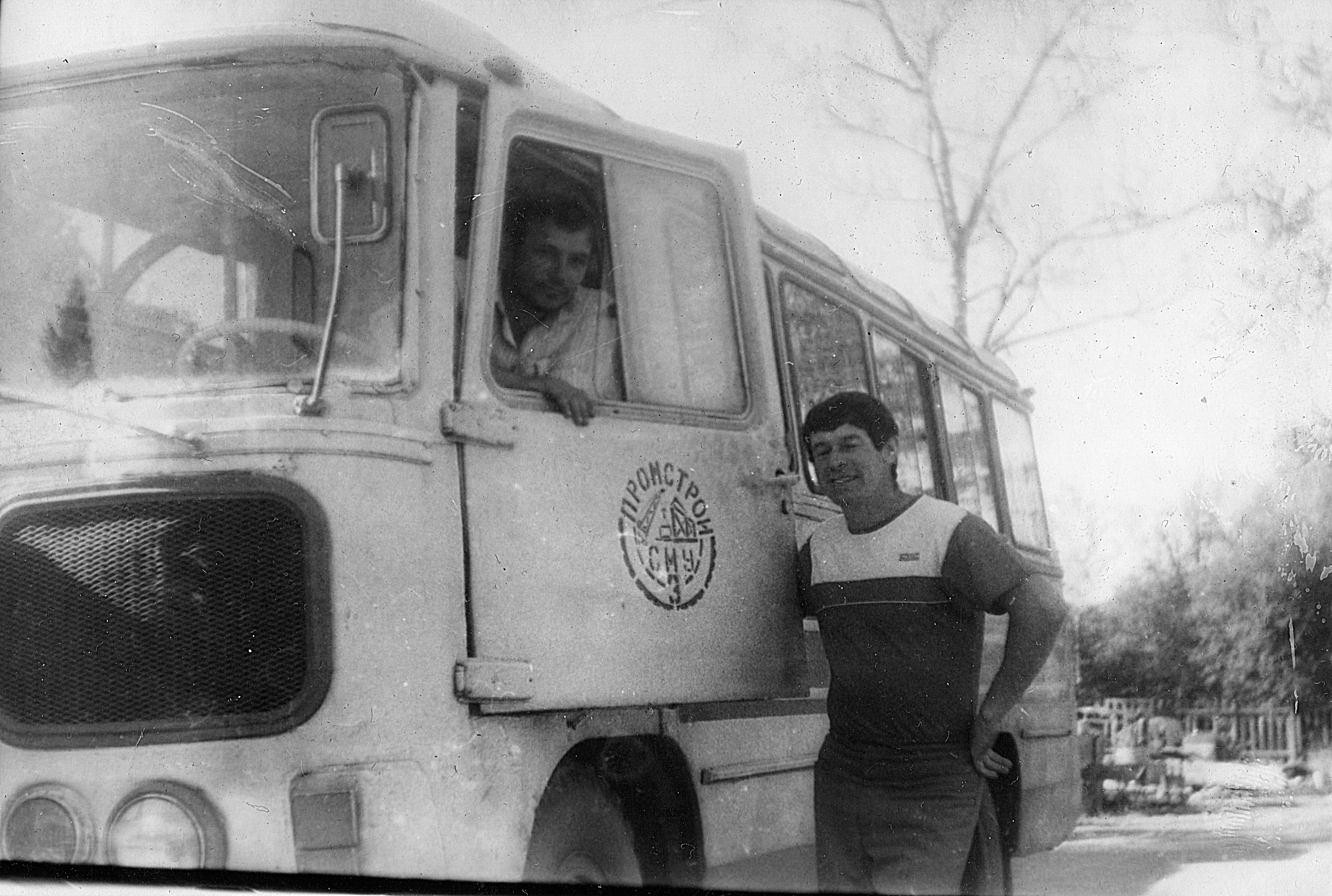
Drivers of the Promstroy cooperative. They were involved in the transportation of people between the villages of Solnechny, Allakh-Yun and Ust-Maya in Yakutia in 1989–1990. And the transportation of goods: took cargo in the port of Ust-Maya. The workers of Promstroi (about 100 people) built (1) a building for BELAZ in Solnechny and (2) a building for the PROK-400 modular processing plant in Allakh-Yun for processing gold (400 tons of ore per day).

Urban-type settlement status was granted to it in 1972.

== Administrative and municipal status ==
Within the framework of administrative divisions, the urban-type settlement of Solnechny, together with one rural locality (the selo of Ust-Ynykchan), is incorporated within Ust-Maysky District as the Settlement of Solnechny. As a municipal division, the Settlement of Solnechny is incorporated within Ust-Maysky Municipal District as Solnechny Urban Settlement.
