= Ust-Maysky District =

Ust-Maysky District Усть-Майский улус (Russian)
- District

Other transcription(s)
  - Sakha: Уус-Маайа улууhа
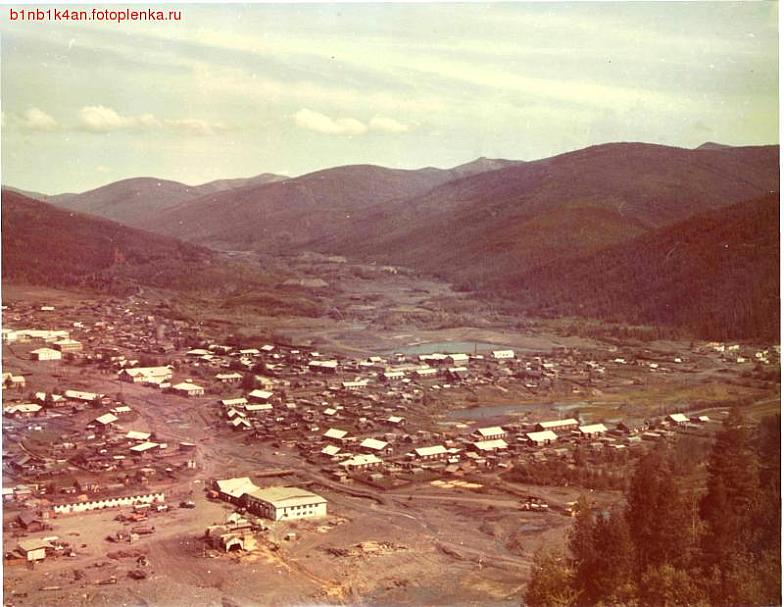
- Ynykchan, 1990, Ust-Maysky District

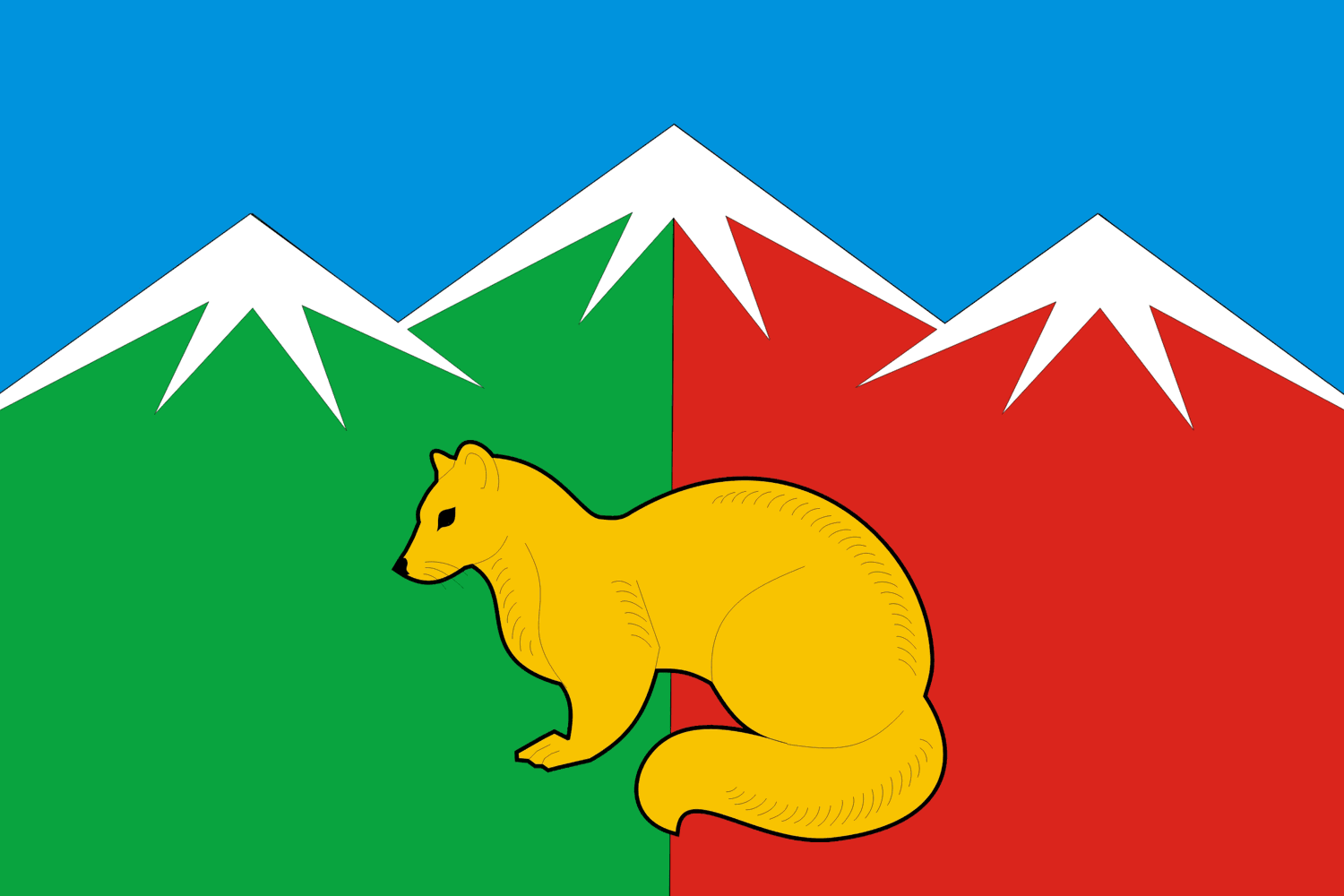
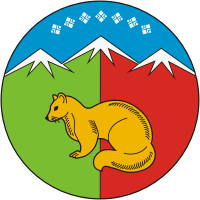
- Flag Coat of arms
- Location of Ust-Maysky District in the Sakha Republic
- Coordinates: 60°25′N 134°32′E
- Country: Russia
- Federal subject: Sakha Republic
- Established: May 20, 1931
- Administrative center: Ust-Maya

Area
  - Total: 95,300 km^{2} (36,800 sq mi)

Population (2010 Census)
  - Total: 8,629
  - Density: 0.0905/km^{2} (0.235/sq mi)
  - Urban: 72.4%
  - Rural: 27.6%

Administrative structure
  - Administrative divisions: 6 Settlements, 5 Rural okrugs
  - Inhabited localities: 6 urban-type settlements, 10 rural localities

Municipal structure
  - Municipally incorporated as: Ust-Maysky Municipal District
  - Municipal divisions: 5 urban settlements, 5 rural settlements
- Time zone: UTC+
- OKTMO ID: 98654000
- Website: http://www.ustmaya-msu.ru/

Ust-Maysky District (Russian: Усть-Ма́йский улу́с; Yakut: Уус-Маайа улууһа, Uus-Maaya uluuha, [uːs-maːja uluːha]) is an administrative and municipal district (raion, or ulus), one of the thirty-four in the Sakha Republic, Russia. It is located in the east of the republic and borders with Oymyakonsky District in the northeast, Okhotsky District and Ayano-Maysky District of Khabarovsk Krai in the east and south, Aldansky District in the southwest, Amginsky District in the west, Churapchinsky and Tattinsky Districts in the northwest, and with Tomponsky District in the north. The area of the district is 95,300 square kilometers (36,800 sq mi). Its administrative center is the urban locality (a settlement) of Ust-Maya. Population: 8,629 (2010 census); 11,568 (2002 Census); 20,337 (1989 Soviet census). The population of Ust-Maya accounts for 33.9% of the district's total population.

== Geography ==
The main rivers in the district are the Aldan and its tributaries the Maya and Allakh-Yun.

Average January temperature ranges from −40 to −42 °C (−40 to −44 °F) and average July temperature ranges from +14 °C (57 °F) in the mountains to +16 °C (61 °F) in the river valleys. Annual precipitation ranges from 250 to 500 millimeters (9.8 to 19.7 in).

== History ==
The district was established on May 20, 1931. The administrative centre of the district was Solnechny from 1972 to 1992, after which it moved to Ust-Maya.

== Demographics ==
As of the 2021 Census, the ethnic composition was as follows:

- Russians: 54.0%
- Evenks: 28.4%
- Yakuts: 9.9%
- Ukrainians: 1.9%
- Evens: 1.1%
- other ethnicities: 4.7%

== Economy ==
The economy of the district is mostly based on mining, timber industry, and production of construction materials. There are deposits of gold, lead, zinc, rare metals, and construction materials.

== Inhabited localities ==
Municipal composition
Urban settlements	Population	Male	Female	Inhabited localities in jurisdiction
Zvyozdochka (Звездочка)	408	279 (68.4%)	129 (31.6%)	**Urban-type settlement of Zvyozdochka**
Solnechny (Солнечный)	1,034	534 (51.6%)	500 (48.4%)	**Urban-type settlement of Solnechny**; selo of Ust-Ynykchan
Ust-Maya (Усть-Мая)	2,952	1,429 (48.4%)	1,523 (51.6%)	**Urban-type settlement of Ust-Maya** (administrative centre of the district); selo of Ust-Yudoma
Eldikan (Эльдикан)	1,515	726 (47.9%)	789 (52.1%)	**Urban-type settlement of Eldikan**; selo of 8-y km
Yugoryonok (Югоренок)	272	176 (64.7%)	96 (35.3%)	**Urban-type settlement of Yugoryonok**
Rural settlements	Population	Male	Female	Rural localities in jurisdiction*
Kyupsky National Nasleg (Кюпский национальный)	536	263 (49.1%)	273 (50.9%)	**selo of Kyuptsy**; selo of Tumul
Petropavlovsky National Nasleg (Петропавловский национальный)	985	478 (48.5%)	507 (51.5%)	**selo of Petropavlovsk**; selo of Troitsk
Ezhansky National Nasleg (Эжанский национальный)	360	179 (49.7%)	181 (50.3%)	**selo of Ezhantsy**
Villages	Population	Male	Female	Rural localities in jurisdiction*
Belkachi (Белькачи)	179	96 (53.6%)	83 (46.4%)	**selo of Belkachi**
Ust-Mil (Усть-Миль)	292	147 (50.3%)	145 (49.7%)	**selo of Ust-Mil**
Inhabited localities in the inter-settlement territory	Population	Male	Female	Inhabited localities in jurisdiction
Allakh-Yun (Аллах-Юнь)	96	55 (57.3%)	41 (42.7%)	Urban-type settlement of Allakh-Yun

Divisional source:
Population source:
*Administrative centers are shown in bold
