= Eldikan =

Eldikan Эльдикан
- Urban-type settlement

Other transcription(s)
  - Yakut: Элдьикээн
- Interactive map of Eldikan
- Location of Eldikan Eldikan (Sakha Republic)
- Coordinates: 60°47′N 135°09′E
- Country: Russia
- Federal subject: Sakha Republic
- Administrative district: Ust-Maysky District
- SettlementSelsoviet: Settlement of Eldikan
- Founded: 1941
- Urban-type settlement status since: 1948
- Elevation: 166 m (545 ft)

Population (2010 Census)
  - Total: 1,515
  - Estimate (2023): 1,035 (−31.7%)

Administrative status
  - Capital of: Settlement of Eldikan

Municipal status
  - Municipal district: Ust-Maysky Municipal District
  - Urban settlement: Eldikan Urban Settlement
  - Capital of: Eldikan Urban Settlement
- Time zone: UTC+
- Postal code: 678623
- OKTMO ID: 98654164051

Eldikan population
- 2010 Census: 1,515
- 2002 Census: 2,199
- 1989 Census: 2,963
- 1979 Census: 2,974

Eldikan (Russian: Эльдикан; Yakut: Элдьикээн, Elcikeen) is an urban locality (an urban-type settlement) in Ust-Maysky District of the Sakha Republic, Russia, located on the right bank of the Aldan River, 64 kilometers (40 mi) northeast of Ust-Maya, the administrative center of the district. As of the 2010 Census, its population was 1,515.

== History ==
It was established in 1941 as a river port, as a base for the developing gold mining activities on the Yudoma and Allakh-Yun Rivers. Urban-type settlement status was granted to it in 1948, when it became the administrative center of Allakh-Yunsky District. It lost this role again in 1953 with the merger of the district back into Ust-Maysky District.

== Administrative and municipal status ==
Within the framework of administrative divisions, the urban-type settlement of Eldikan, together with one rural locality (the selo of 8-y km), is incorporated within Ust-Maysky District as the Settlement of Eldikan. As a municipal division, the Settlement of Eldikan is incorporated within Ust-Maysky Municipal District as Eldikan Urban Settlement.

== Economy and infrastructure ==
Eldikan serves as an important distribution center for the district's gold mining industry, and as an energy center. Agricultural products produced here include vegetables, pigs, horses, cows, potatoes, cabbage, and fish.

Eldikan is connected via a more than 300-kilometer (190 mi) long road with Yugoryonok on the Yudoma River, with side roads connecting with the various mining settlements in the area. Eldikan itself, however, remains only connected to the outside world by ship on the Aldan River during the ice-free period, or via an ice road along the frozen river in winter. There is also a winter road along the Aldan to Ust-Maya and a further 300 kilometers (190 mi) onwards to Amga, from which an all-weather road connects to Nizhny Bestyakh near the republic's capital of Yakutsk.

A new year-round road is planned which will connect Eldikan with the settlement of Khandyga on the Kolyma Highway. The construction of the first section, to Dzhebariki-Khaya, began in 2009.

A small airport in Eldikan is no longer in regular use.

== See also ==
- Kyllakh Range
