= Yugoryonok =

Yugoryonok Югорёнок
- Urban-type settlement

Other transcription(s)
  - Yakut: Югорёнок
- Interactive map of Yugoryonok
- Location of Yugoryonok Yugoryonok (Sakha Republic)
- Coordinates: 59°45′N 137°40′E
- Country: Russia
- Federal subject: Sakha Republic
- Administrative district: Ust-Maysky District
- SettlementSelsoviet: Settlement of Yugoryonok
- Founded: 1940
- Urban-type settlement status since: 1978

Population (2010 Census)
  - Total: 272
  - Estimate (2023): 325 (+19.5%)

Administrative status
  - Capital of: Settlement of Yugoryonok

Municipal status
  - Municipal district: Ust-Maysky Municipal District
  - Urban settlement: Yugoryonok Urban Settlement
  - Capital of: Yugoryonok Urban Settlement
- Time zone: UTC+
- Postal code: 678643
- OKTMO ID: 98654166051

Yugoryonok population
- 2010 Census: 272
- 2002 Census: 905
- 1989 Census: 1,870
- 1979 Census: 1,413

Yugoryonok (Russian: Югорёнок) is an urban locality (an urban-type settlement) in Ust-Maysky District of the Sakha Republic, Russia, located 350 kilometers (220 mi) from Ust-Maya, the administrative center of the district, in a highly isolated region on the right bank of the Yudoma River. As of the 2010 Census, its population was 272.

== History ==
It was founded in 1940 at a river port on the Yudoma, for use as a service base for the nearby goldfields. It was initially administered from Yur, located about 12 kilometers (7.5 mi) away. With the cessation of gold mining in the 1970s, Yur was abandoned, and Yugoryonok was granted urban-type settlement status in 1978. With the cessation of mining activities in the 1990s, its population has decreased dramatically.

== Geography ==
=== Climate ===
Climate data for Yugoryonok
Month	Jan	Feb	Mar	Apr	May	Jun	Jul	Aug	Sep	Oct	Nov	Dec	Year
Record high °C (°F)	−4.8 (23.4)	−1.2 (29.8)	8.6 (47.5)	17.4 (63.3)	29.9 (85.8)	35.1 (95.2)	36.3 (97.3)	34.6 (94.3)	26.6 (79.9)	14.0 (57.2)	3.2 (37.8)	0.3 (32.5)	36.3 (97.3)
Mean daily maximum °C (°F)	−32.2 (−26.0)	−24.8 (−12.6)	−10.8 (12.6)	2.0 (35.6)	12.7 (54.9)	22.3 (72.1)	24.3 (75.7)	21.0 (69.8)	11.8 (53.2)	−2.7 (27.1)	−21.1 (−6.0)	−33.3 (−27.9)	−2.6 (27.4)
Daily mean °C (°F)	−36.5 (−33.7)	−31.7 (−25.1)	−19.2 (−2.6)	−4.9 (23.2)	5.9 (42.6)	14.1 (57.4)	16.5 (61.7)	13.1 (55.6)	5.3 (41.5)	−7.9 (17.8)	−26.0 (−14.8)	−36.9 (−34.4)	−9.0 (15.8)
Mean daily minimum °C (°F)	−40.1 (−40.2)	−37.1 (−34.8)	−27.1 (−16.8)	−12.1 (10.2)	−0.6 (30.9)	5.8 (42.4)	9.2 (48.6)	6.1 (43.0)	−0.1 (31.8)	−12.7 (9.1)	−30.2 (−22.4)	−40.2 (−40.4)	−14.9 (5.1)
Record low °C (°F)	−55.0 (−67.0)	−52.1 (−61.8)	−46.9 (−52.4)	−33.3 (−27.9)	−17.0 (1.4)	−5.6 (21.9)	−3.1 (26.4)	−5.7 (21.7)	−17.3 (0.9)	−38.2 (−36.8)	−50.7 (−59.3)	−55.1 (−67.2)	−55.1 (−67.2)
Average precipitation mm (inches)	12 (0.5)	6 (0.2)	9 (0.4)	16 (0.6)	31 (1.2)	46 (1.8)	67 (2.6)	58 (2.3)	64 (2.5)	33 (1.3)	20 (0.8)	11 (0.4)	373 (14.6)
Source: www.pogodaiklimat.ru

== Administrative and municipal status ==
Within the framework of administrative divisions, the urban-type settlement of Yugoryonok is incorporated within Ust-Maysky District as the Settlement of Yugoryonok. As a municipal division, the Settlement of Yugoryonok is incorporated within Ust-Maysky Municipal District as Yugoryonok Urban Settlement.

== Transportation ==
Yugoryonok is located at the end of a 300-kilometer (190 mi) road linking it with Eldikan on the Aldan River and the other gold-mining settlements in the area (now mostly abandoned). Yugoryonok was previously served by a small airport, which closed in the 1990s.
