= Yudoma =

Yudoma Юдома
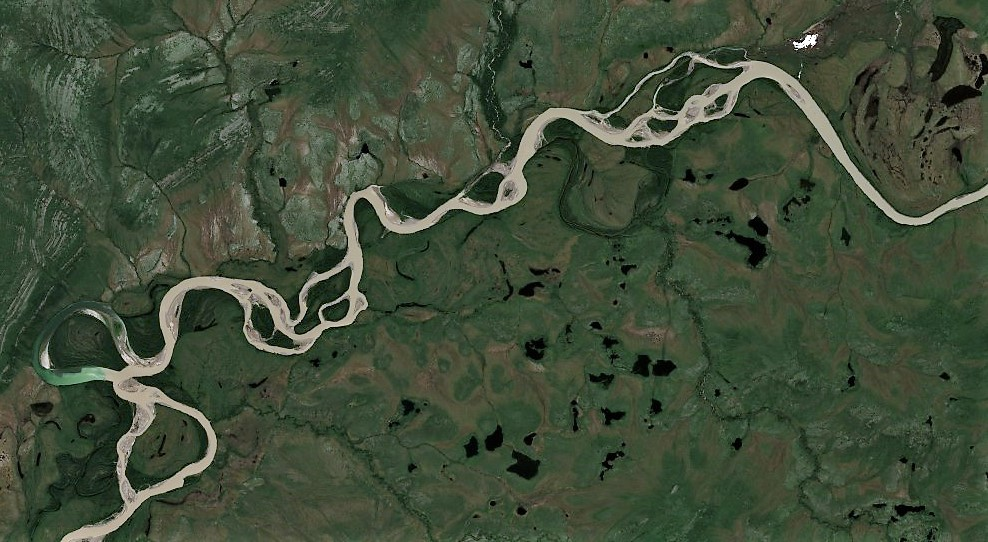
- Middle course of the Yudoma Sentinel-2 image.

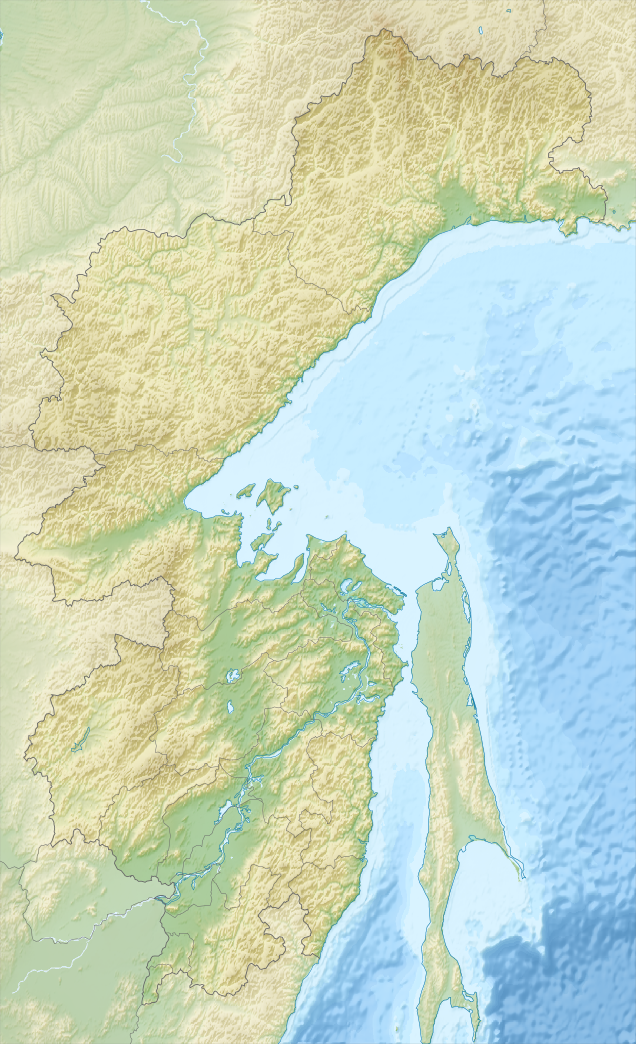
- Mouth location in Yakutia, Russia Yudoma (Khabarovsk Krai)

Location
- Country: Russia

Physical characteristics
- Source: Suntar-Khayata
  - coordinates: 62°06′37″N 140°34′30″E
  - elevation: 997 m (0.620 mi)
- Mouth: Maya
  - coordinates: 59°09′35″N 135°17′58″E
  - elevation: 193 m (0.120 mi)
- Length: 765 km (475 mi)
- Basin size: 43,700 km^{2} (16,900 sq mi)

Basin features
- Progression: Maya→ Aldan→ Lena→ Laptev Sea

The Yudoma (Russian: Юдома) is a river in Khabarovsk Krai and Yakutia, Russian Federation. Its length in 765 kilometres (475 mi) and its basin is 43,700 square kilometres (16,900 mi^{2}) (about the size of Switzerland). It joins the Maya which joins the Aldan which joins the Lena which flows into the Arctic Ocean.

== Geography ==
The Yudoma flows in Eastern Siberia in the Yudoma-Maya Highlands near the Okhotsk Coast. Its northern headwaters are in the Suntar-Khayata Range. To the east is the Yudoma Range and then the Okhota, to the south the Maya and to the northwest, the Allakh-Yun, another tributary of the Aldan. It is formed at the confluence of the 55 km (34 mi) long Nitkan from the left and the 43 km (27 mi) long Avliya from the right. At its mouth the minimum water flow is 3.7 cubic metres per second (130 cu ft/s) in March, and the maximum is 1,081 cubic metres per second (38,200 cu ft/s) in June. At its mouth it is 300 metres (980 ft) wide and 4 metres (13 ft) deep. The lower 270 kilometres (170 mi) are considered navigable. The Yudoma limits the southern end of the Ulakhan-Bom range.

The river flows south for about 200 kilometres (120 mi) west of the Yudoma Range and then flows southwest about 325 kilometres (202 mi) (straight-line distance) to its mouth on the Maya. It starts about 30 kilometres (19 mi) south of Mus-Khaya Mountain, the highest point in the Suntar-Khayata Range.

=== Tributaries ===
The main tributaries of the Yudoma are the 212 kilometres (132 mi) long Kirbii (Кирбии) and the 109 kilometres (68 mi) long Kyala (Кяла) from the left, as well as the 135 kilometres (84 mi) long Akachan from the right. The river is fed by snowmelt and summer rains. It is frozen from mid-October to late May.

== Infrastructure and local economy ==
The area is largely unsettled and there is hardly any infrastructure. The only significant settlement is Yugoryonok.

At the 'corner' of the river origin began the long Okhotsk Portage which ran east-southeast to the Okhota River. About 50 kilometres (31 mi) south was Yudoma Cross from which the Yudoma Portage led southeast to the Urak river and a longer horse track led to Urak Landing. North of Yudoma Cross a horse track led to Yakutsk. Near here the border between the Sakha Republic and Khabarovsk Krai joins the Yudoma and follows it to its mouth. About 30 kilometres (19 mi) west of Yudoma Cross (straight-line distance) is the gold-extracting town of Yugoryonok which is reached by a 480-kilometre (300 mi) dirt road running south from Eldikan on the Aldan River.

The Yudoma was one of the river routes to the Okhotsk Coast. Because of its rapids and swift current there was a great deal of tracking (see portage). Rapids and cataracts blocked the larger boats that were used on the Maya. Some 80 kilometres (50 mi) below Yudoma Cross a cataract was bypassed by a crude canal which was dry at low water. In 1737 Stepan Krasheninnikov took three days to go downstream from Yudoma Cross to the Maya, whereas it took five to six weeks to make the same trip upstream.

== See also ==
- List of rivers of Russia
- Yudoma-Maya Highlands
