= Ust-Maya =

Ust-Maya Усть-Мая
- Urban-type settlement

Other transcription(s)
  - Yakut: Уус Маайа
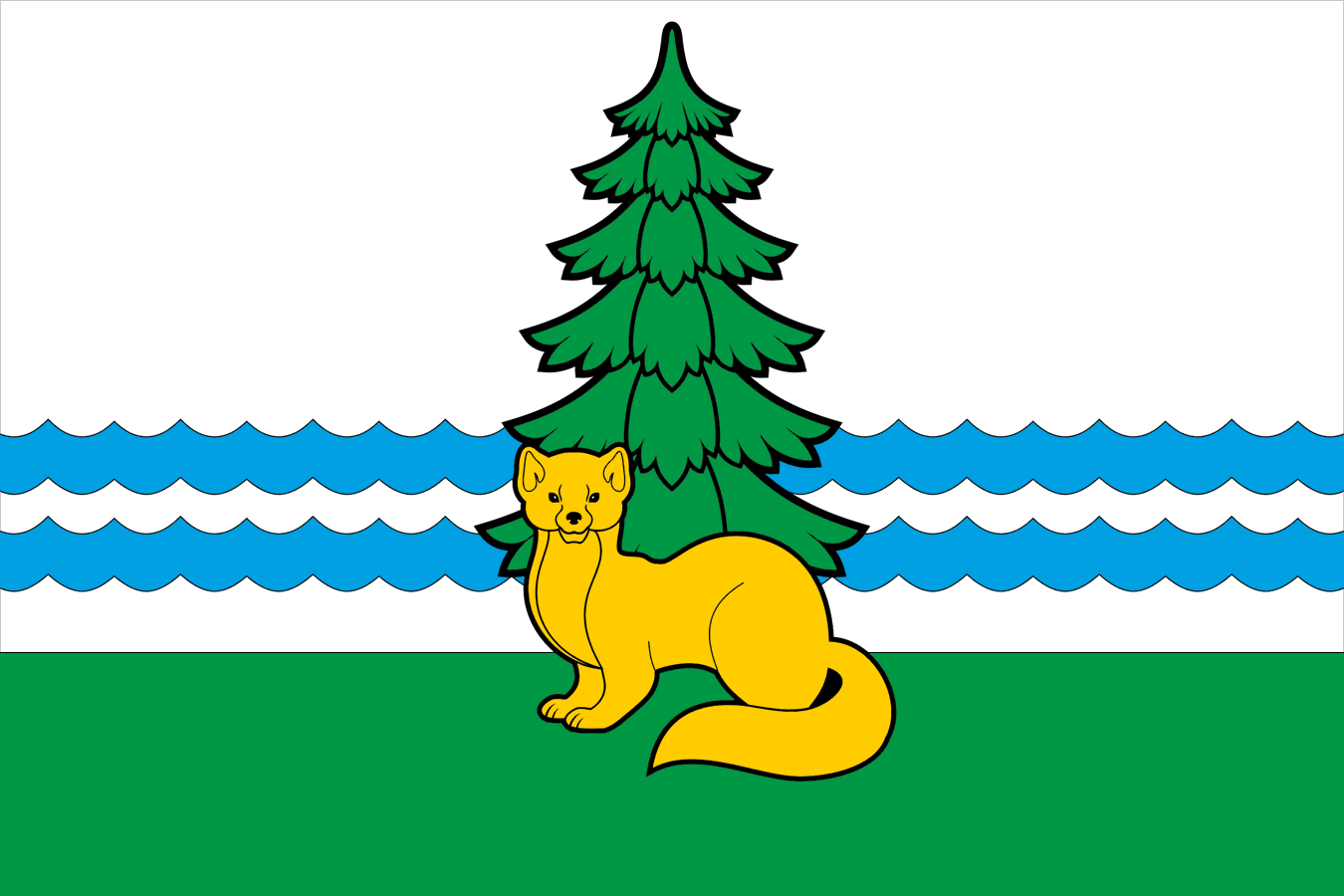
- Flag
- Interactive map of Ust-Maya
- Location of Ust-Maya Ust-Maya (Sakha Republic)
- Coordinates: 60°25′N 134°33′E
- Country: Russia
- Federal subject: Sakha Republic
- Administrative district: Ust-Maysky District
- SettlementSelsoviet: Ust-Maya
- Founded: 1930
- Urban-type settlement status since: 1957

Population (2010 Census)
  - Total: 2,923
  - Estimate (2023): 2,516 (−13.9%)

Administrative status
  - Capital of: Settlement of Ust-Maya

Municipal status
  - Municipal district: Ust-Maysky Municipal District
  - Urban settlement: Ust-Maya Urban Settlement
  - Capital of: Ust-Maya Urban Settlement
- Time zone: UTC+
- Postal codes: 678620, 678629
- OKTMO ID: 98654151051

Ust-Maya population
- 2010 Census: 2,923
- 2002 Census: 3,165
- 1989 Census: 3,514
- 1979 Census: 2,990

Ust-Maya (Russian: Усть-Ма́я; Yakut: Уус Маайа, Uus Maaya) is an urban locality (an urban-type settlement) and the administrative center of Ust-Maysky District of the Sakha Republic, Russia, southeast of Yakutsk, the capital of the republic. As of the 2010 Census, its population was 2,293.

== Geography ==
Ust-Maya is located on the north bank of the Aldan River opposite the mouth of the Maya River. The Sette-Daban mountain range rises to the east of the town.

== History ==
Ust-Maya was founded in 1930 as a base for gold mining activities on the Allakh-Yun and Yudoma Rivers to the east. It became the administrative center of the newly created Ust-Maysky District in 1931. During World War II, an airfield was built here for the Alaska-Siberian air route used to ferry American Lend-Lease aircraft to the Eastern Front. In 1957, Ust-Maya was granted urban-type settlement status. In 1972, the administrative center of the district was moved to Solnechny, where it remained until 1992, when it was moved back to Ust-Maya.

== Administrative and municipal status ==
Within the framework of administrative divisions, the urban-type settlement of Ust-Maya serves as the administrative center of Ust-Maysky District. As an administrative division, it is, together with one rural locality (the selo of Ust-Yudoma), incorporated within Ust-Maysky District as the Settlement of Ust-Maya. As a municipal division, the Settlement of Ust-Maya is incorporated within Ust-Maysky Municipal District as Ust-Maya Urban Settlement.

== Transportation ==
There are no year-round roads connecting Ust-Maya with outside world; however, winter roads connect it to Eldikan and Amga.

The Ust-Maya Airport (IATA: UMS) is located in the selo of Petropavlovsk, 8 kilometers (5.0 mi) to the southeast.

== Climate ==
Ust-Maya has an extreme subarctic climate (Köppen climate classification Dfd). Winters are extremely cold, while summers are quite warm. Precipitation is quite low and is somewhat higher in summer than at other times of the year.

Climate data for Ust-Maya (1991-2020, extremes 1893-present)
Month	Jan	Feb	Mar	Apr	May	Jun	Jul	Aug	Sep	Oct	Nov	Dec	Year
Record high °C (°F)	−5.5 (22.1)	−2.0 (28.4)	9.4 (48.9)	17.8 (64.0)	30.3 (86.5)	35.3 (95.5)	36.3 (97.3)	34.6 (94.3)	26.4 (79.5)	15.6 (60.1)	5.8 (42.4)	−4.9 (23.2)	36.3 (97.3)
Mean daily maximum °C (°F)	−34.2 (−29.6)	−26.5 (−15.7)	−9.9 (14.2)	3.9 (39.0)	14.8 (58.6)	23.5 (74.3)	25.8 (78.4)	22.1 (71.8)	12.5 (54.5)	−2.2 (28.0)	−21.6 (−6.9)	−34.9 (−30.8)	−2.2 (28.0)
Daily mean °C (°F)	−38.3 (−36.9)	−33.6 (−28.5)	−19 (−2)	−3.1 (26.4)	8.1 (46.6)	16.3 (61.3)	18.9 (66.0)	15.0 (59.0)	6.5 (43.7)	−6.5 (20.3)	−26 (−15)	−38.2 (−36.8)	−8.3 (17.0)
Mean daily minimum °C (°F)	−41.7 (−43.1)	−39.2 (−38.6)	−27.9 (−18.2)	−10.4 (13.3)	1.8 (35.2)	9.2 (48.6)	12.5 (54.5)	8.9 (48.0)	1.7 (35.1)	−10.1 (13.8)	−29.9 (−21.8)	−41.3 (−42.3)	−13.9 (7.0)
Record low °C (°F)	−60.2 (−76.4)	−60 (−76)	−54.1 (−65.4)	−38.7 (−37.7)	−19.2 (−2.6)	−5.4 (22.3)	−3.1 (26.4)	−7.2 (19.0)	−17 (1)	−38.3 (−36.9)	−54.4 (−65.9)	−59.4 (−74.9)	−60.2 (−76.4)
Average precipitation mm (inches)	11.8 (0.46)	8.3 (0.33)	8.1 (0.32)	11.0 (0.43)	28.6 (1.13)	34.3 (1.35)	53.7 (2.11)	50.8 (2.00)	44.5 (1.75)	29.5 (1.16)	19.5 (0.77)	10.9 (0.43)	311 (12.24)
Average rainy days	0	0	0.1	3	13	14	14	14	14	4	0.1	0	76
Average snowy days	23	20	13	6	1	0	0	0	1	18	24	22	128
Average relative humidity (%)	77	77	71	62	57	62	68	73	75	80	81	78	72
Mean monthly sunshine hours	40	124	229	256	283	313	320	245	153	95	75	21	2,154
Source 1: pogoda.ru.net
Source 2: NOAA (sun only, 1961-1990)
