= Munni =

River in Yakutia, Russia

Munni Мунни / Мунньи
- Mouth location in Yakutia, Russia

Location
- Country: Russia

Physical characteristics
- Source
  - location: Kelter Range
- Mouth: Belyanka
  - coordinates: 64°15′33″N 128°46′32″E
  - elevation: ca 169 m (554 ft)
- Length: 103 km (64 mi)
- Basin size: 1,760 square kilometres (680 mi^{2})

Basin features
- Progression: Belyanka → Lena→ Laptev Sea

The Munni (Russian: Мунни; Yakut: Мунньи, Munñi) is a river in the Sakha Republic (Yakutia), Russia, a right tributary of the Belyanka, of the Lena basin. It has a length of 103 kilometres (64 mi) and a drainage basin area of 1,760 square kilometres (680 mi^{2}).

There are no settlements in the basin of the river. The nearest village is Batamay, located to the east of the mouth of the Belyanka in the Lena.

== Course ==
The Munni is a mountain river that flows in the southwestern area of the Verkhoyansk Range. It has its sources in the slopes of the Kelter Range and flows southwards in its upper course. Then it bends westwards along the northern edge of the Munni Range at the eastern limit of the Tagindzhin Range. After bending southwards again its valley is bound by the eastern end of the Muosuchan Range. Finally the confluence of river Munni from the west and Tagyndzha from the east gives origin to the Belyanka.

The river freezes between mid October and the end of May.

== See also ==
- List of rivers of Russia
