= Batamay (river) =

River in Russia

Batamay Батамай
- Mouth location in Yakutia, Russia

Location
- Country: Russia

Physical characteristics
- Source
  - location: Confluence of Oyun-Taryn and Seeminde
  - coordinates: 63°43′29″N 129°23′25″E
  - elevation: 127 m (417 ft)
- Mouth: Lena
  - coordinates: 63°31′11″N 129°24′01″E
  - elevation: 75 m (246 ft)
- Length: 35 km (22 mi)

Batamay (Russian: Батамай) is a river in Kobyaysky District, Russia. It is a right tributary of the Lena, with a length of 35 km (22 mi) and a catchment area of 3,210 km^{2} (1,240 sq mi).

== Course ==
The river is formed at the southwestern end of the Verkhoyansk Range, below the slopes of the Munni and Sorkin ranges at the confluence of rivers Oyun-Taryn from the right and Seeminde from the left. It flows roughly southwards across the Central Yakutian Lowland in a wide floodplain. Finally it flows into the Lena upstream from the Belyanka, near Batamay. The water pool code is 18030700112117400000017.

== See also ==
- List of rivers of Russia
