= Nuora =

Nuora Нуора
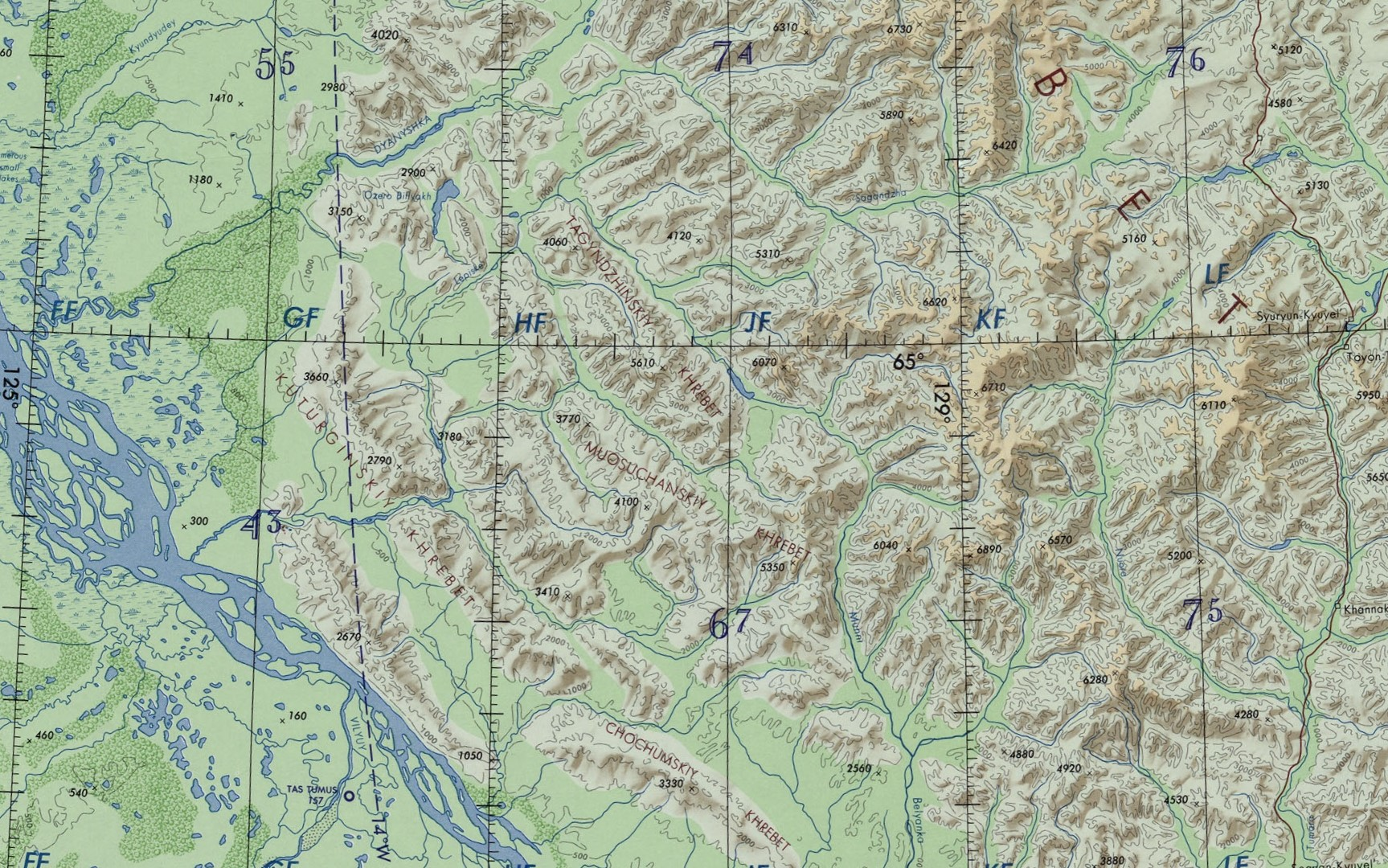
- ONC chart section with the Nuora on the right.

- Mouth location in Yakutia, Russia

Location
- Country: Russian Federation
- Federal subject: Yakutia
- District: Kobyaysky District

Physical characteristics
- Source: Verkhoyansk Range
  - coordinates: 65°09′30″N 129°30′40″E
  - elevation: ca 1,000 m (3,300 ft)
- Mouth: Tumara
  - coordinates: 64°17′23″N 130°25′59″E
- Length: 110 km (68 mi)
- Basin size: 3,120 km^{2} (1,200 sq mi)

Basin features
- Progression: Tumara → Aldan→ Lena→ Laptev Sea

The Nuora (Russian: Нуора; Yakut: Нуора) is a river in the Sakha Republic (Yakutia), Russia, a right tributary of the Tumara, of the Aldan basin, part of the Lena basin. It has a length of 110 kilometres (68 mi) and a drainage basin area of 3,120 square kilometres (1,200 mi^{2}).

The Nuora flows across an area of the Kobyaysky District that is wholly mountainous and desolate. Segyan-Kyuyol village, the closest inhabited place, lies to the south of its confluence with the Tumara. The river is a destination for rafting. The name of the river comes from the Yakut language.

== Course ==
The Nuora is a mountain river that originates south of the Arctic Circle near the Arkachan Plateau, central part of the southern Verkhoyansk Range. In the uppermost stretch of its course the river flows southwards. As it meets the Kelter Range, it bends roughly southeastwards, flowing below the northeastern slopes of the range within a deep valley. Finally the Nuora meets the right bank of the Tumara River, a little upstream from where it cuts southwards across the Kelter Range, 146 kilometres (91 mi) from its mouth in the Aldan.

The Nuora has numerous tributaries that are longer than 10 km (6.2 mi). The longest are the 27 km (17 mi) long Kelter, the 34 km (21 mi) long Burgavli and the 34 km (21 mi) long Munilchan from the right and the 20 km (12 mi) long Taal from the left.

== Fauna ==
In the same manner as the upper course of the neighboring Tumara, the Nuora has fast-flowing clear waters fed by rain and snow. Taimen, lenok, whitefish, grayling, pike, ide and perch are found in the waters of the river.

== See also ==
- List of rivers of Russia
