= Tukulan (river) =

Tukulan Тукулан
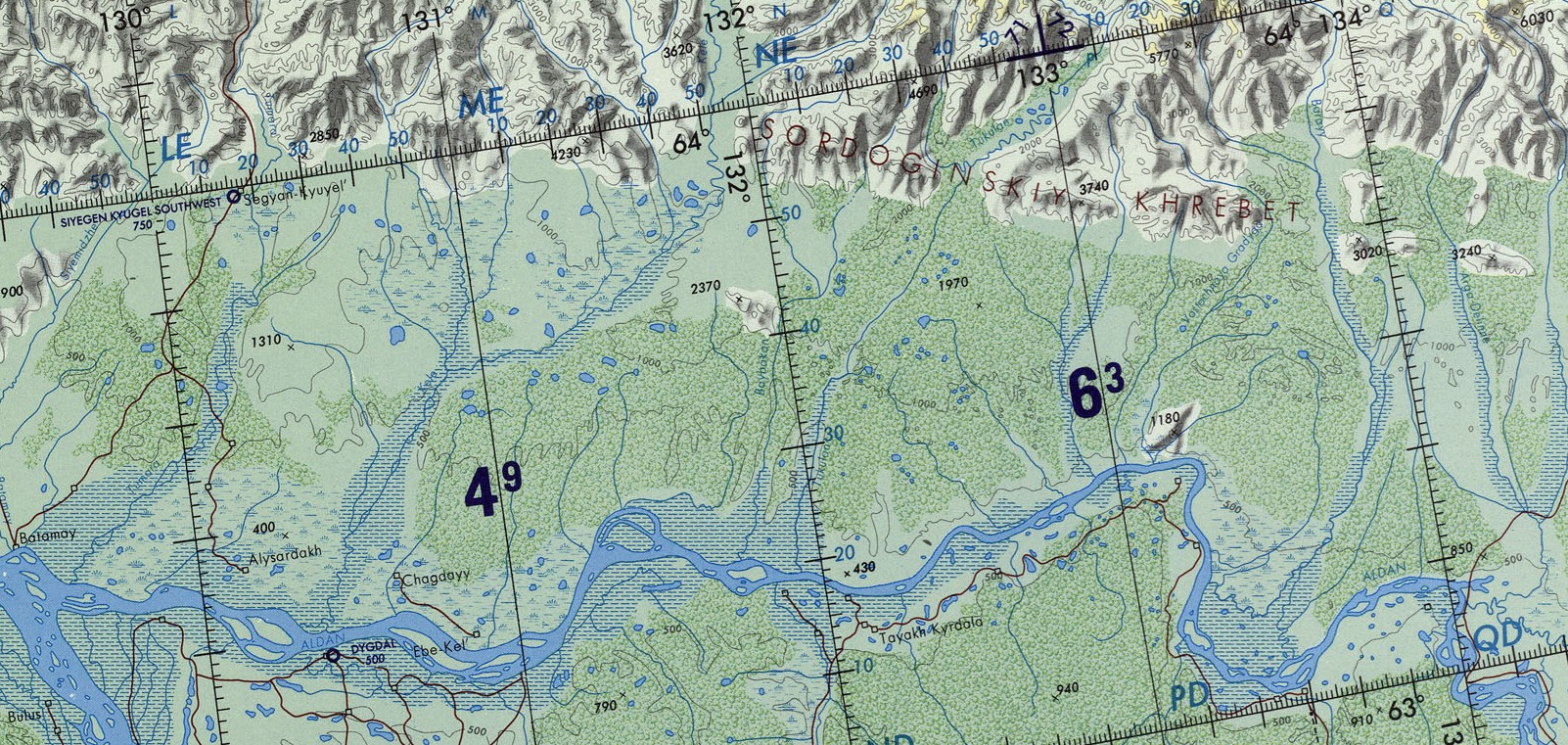
- Sordogin Range and course of the Tukulan

- Mouth location in Yakutia, Russia

Location
- Country: Russian Federation

Physical characteristics
- Source: Lake Ulakhan-Kyuel, Verkhoyansk Range
- Mouth: Aldan River
  - coordinates: 63°19′0.26″N 131°55′31.69″E
- Length: 191 km (119 mi)
- Basin size: 2,880 km^{2} (1,110 sq mi)

Basin features
- Progression: Aldan→ Lena→ Laptev Sea

The Tukulan (Russian: Тукулаан; Yakut: Тукулан) is a river in the Sakha Republic (Yakutia), Russia, a right tributary of the Aldan, part of the Lena basin.

The Tukulan has a length of 191 kilometres (119 mi) and a drainage basin area of 2,880 square kilometres (1,110 mi^{2}). There are no settlements in the area of the river. The nearest inhabited places are Batamay of Kobyaysky District to the west of the Tukulan's mouth and Udarnik, Krest-Khaldzhay and Ary-Tolon of Tompo District to the east.

== Course ==
The Tukulan originates in Lake Ulakhan-Kyuel, a 1.5 km^{2} (0.58 sq mi) mountain lake of the southwestern Verkhoyansk Range located in Ust-Aldan District. In the upper section of its course the river flows across mountainous terrain, heading roughly southwestwards across the Sordogin Range.

After leaving the mountainous area the Tukulan flows approximately in the same SW direction along its middle course. It crosses a floodplain dotted with about 200 lakes where the riverbed divides into slowly-flowing arms. Its lower course is a vast marshy area. Finally the Tukulan meets the right bank of the Aldan River, a little upstream from the mouth of the Kele and downstream of the Baray, 148 km (92 mi) from the confluence of the Aldan with the Lena. The river freezes between mid October and mid May.

The Tukulan's main tributary is the 98 km (61 mi) long Tuora Tukulan joining it from the right side.

== See also ==
- List of rivers of Russia
