= Kelter Range =

Mountain range in Russia

- Кельтерский Хребет / Кэлтэр сис
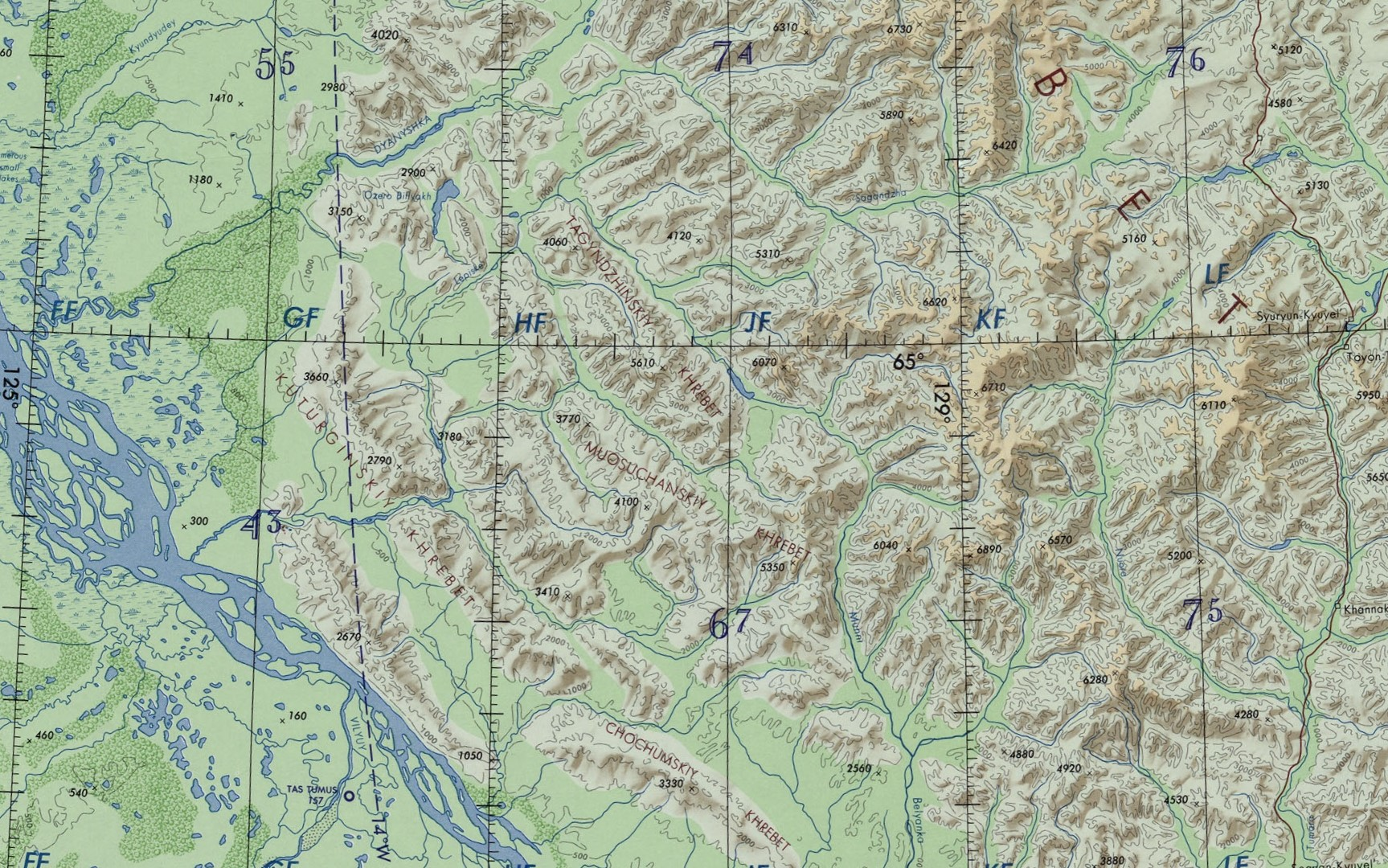
- ONC chart section showing the SW section of the Verkhoyansk Range

Highest point
- Peak: Unnamed
- Elevation: 2,002 m (6,568 ft)

Dimensions
- Length: 170 km (110 mi) NW / SE
- Width: 40 km (25 mi) NE/ SW

Geography
- Location within Sakha Republic
- Location: Sakha Republic, Far Eastern Federal District
- Range coordinates: 64°38′N 129°20′E
- Parent range: Verkhoyansk Range, East Siberian System

Geology
- Orogeny: Alpine orogeny
- Rock type(s): Sandstone, limestone

Climbing
- Easiest route: From Segyan-Kyuyol

The Kelter Range (Russian: Кельтерский Хребет; Yakut: Кэлтэр сис) is a range of mountains in far North-eastern Russia. Administratively the range is part of the Sakha Republic, Russian Federation.

The area of the range is uninhabited, the nearest settlement is Segyan-Kyuyol, Kobyaysky District.

== Geography ==
The Kelter Range is one of the subranges of the Verkhoyansk Range system and is located in its southwestern section. It stretches roughly from northwest to southeast to the north of the Munni Range, running in an arch in a parallel direction to it. The western end is bound by the valley of the Tagyndzha, a tributary of the Belyanka, and the eastern by the valley of the Eyeges (Эйэгес), a tributary of the Kele.

River Tumara cuts across the range in its central part and its right tributary Nuora flows below the northeastern slopes of the range. The highest point of the Kelter Range is an unnamed 2,002 metres (6,568 ft) high peak. River Lyapiske has its sources at the western end of the range.

== See also ==
- List of mountains and hills of Russia
