= Natara =

River in Russia

- Mouth location in Yakutia, Russia

Location
- Country: Russia

Physical characteristics
- Source
  - location: Dzhardzhan Range
  - coordinates: 68°18′54″N 126°54′14″E
- Mouth: Lena
  - coordinates: 68°23′51″N 123°55′11″E
  - elevation: 17 m (56 ft)
- Length: 187 km (116 mi)
- Basin size: 5,730 km^{2} (2,210 sq mi)

Basin features
- Progression: Lena→ Laptev Sea

The Natara (Russian: Натара) is a river in Sakha Republic (Yakutia), Russia. It is a tributary of the Lena, having a length of 187 kilometres (116 mi) and a drainage basin area of 5,730 square kilometres (2,210 mi^{2}). There are no settlements in its basin.

== Course ==
The Natara is a right tributary of the Lena. Its source is located in the northern sector of the Verkhoyansk Range, on the western slope of the Dzhardzhan Range. It flows in a roughly westward direction. After leaving the mountains it descends into the Central Yakutian Lowland until it joins the right bank of the Lena 551 km (342 mi) from its mouth.

Its longest tributary is the 105 km (65 mi) long Seen-Yurekh that joins its left bank just 3 km (1.9 mi) upstream from its confluence with the Lena.

Basin of the Lena

== See also ==
- List of rivers of Russia
