= Kele (river) =

Kele Кэлэ
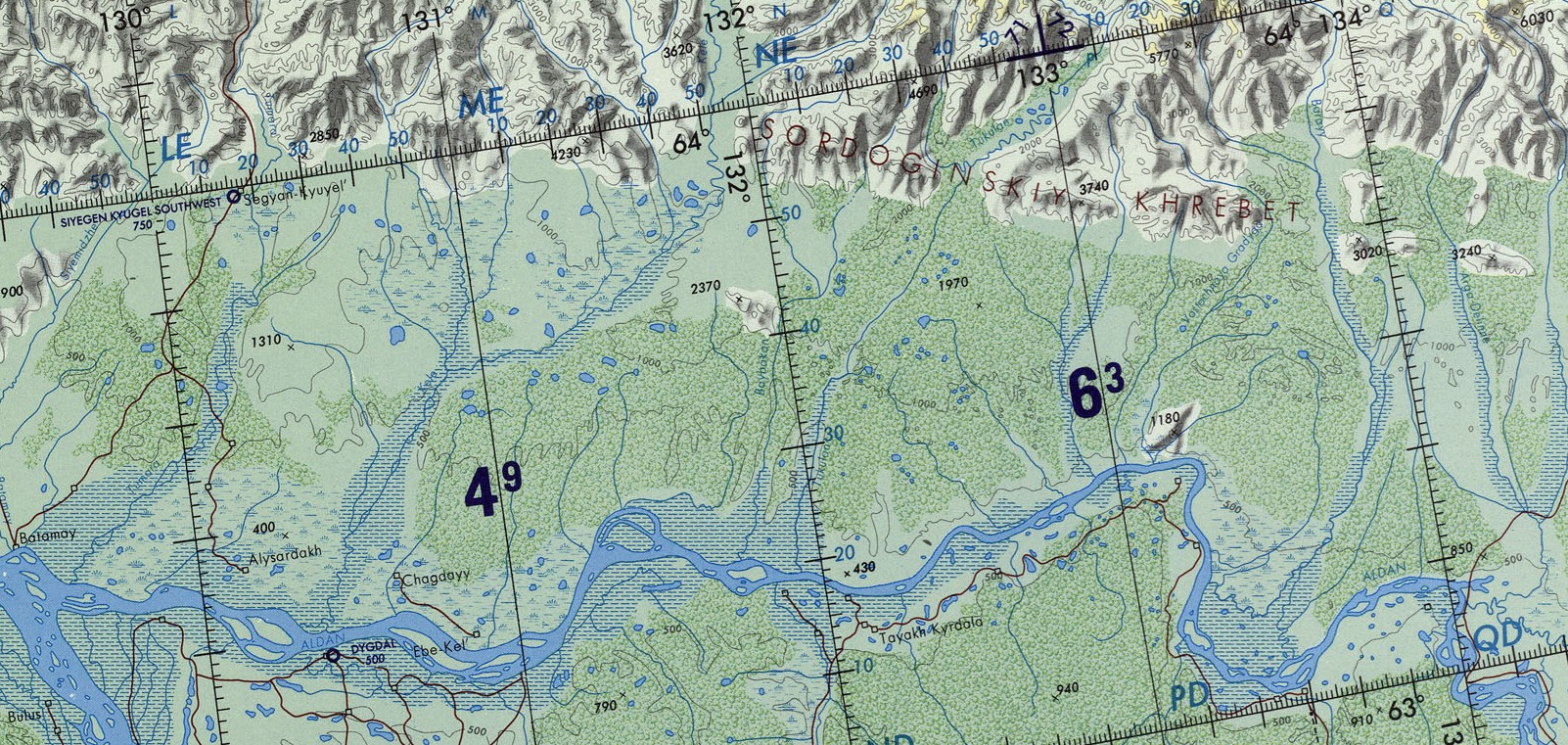
- Sordogin Range and course of the Kele

- Mouth location in Yakutia, Russia

Location
- Country: Russian Federation

Physical characteristics
- Source: Lake Chagdai, Verkhoyansk Range
- Mouth: Aldan River
  - coordinates: 63°20′15″N 130°22′44″E
- Length: 242 km (150 mi)
- Basin size: 8,620 km^{2} (3,330 sq mi)

Basin features
- Progression: Aldan→ Lena→ Laptev Sea

The Kele (Russian: Келе; Yakut: Кэлэ) is a river in the Sakha Republic (Yakutia), Russia, a right tributary of the Aldan, part of the Lena basin.

The Kele has a length of 242 kilometres (150 mi) and a drainage basin area of 8,620 square kilometres (3,330 mi^{2}). There are no settlements in the area of the river. The nearest village is Segyan-Kyuyol to the west, in the Tumara basin.

== Course ==
The Kele originates in a small lake (1.5 km^{2} (0.58 sq mi)) in the slopes of the southwestern Verkhoyansk Range. In the upper section of its course the river flows across mountainous terrain, heading roughly southwestwards in a narrow valley bound by the Munni Range on the western and the Sordogin Range on the eastern side. There are seven ice fields in the river basin with a total area of 28 km^{2} (11 sq mi).

After leaving the mountainous area the Kele flows roughly in the same direction in its middle and lower course. It meanders across a floodplain dotted with about 900 lakes where the riverbed divides into slowly-flowing arms. Finally the Kele meets the right bank of the Aldan River, a little upstream from the mouth of the Tumara and downstream of the Tukulan. The river freezes between mid October and mid May.

The Kele's main tributary is the 98 km (61 mi) long Eyeges (Эйэгес), having its source in the Kelter Range and joining it from the right side.

== See also ==
- List of rivers of Russia
