= Tumara =

Tumara Тумара
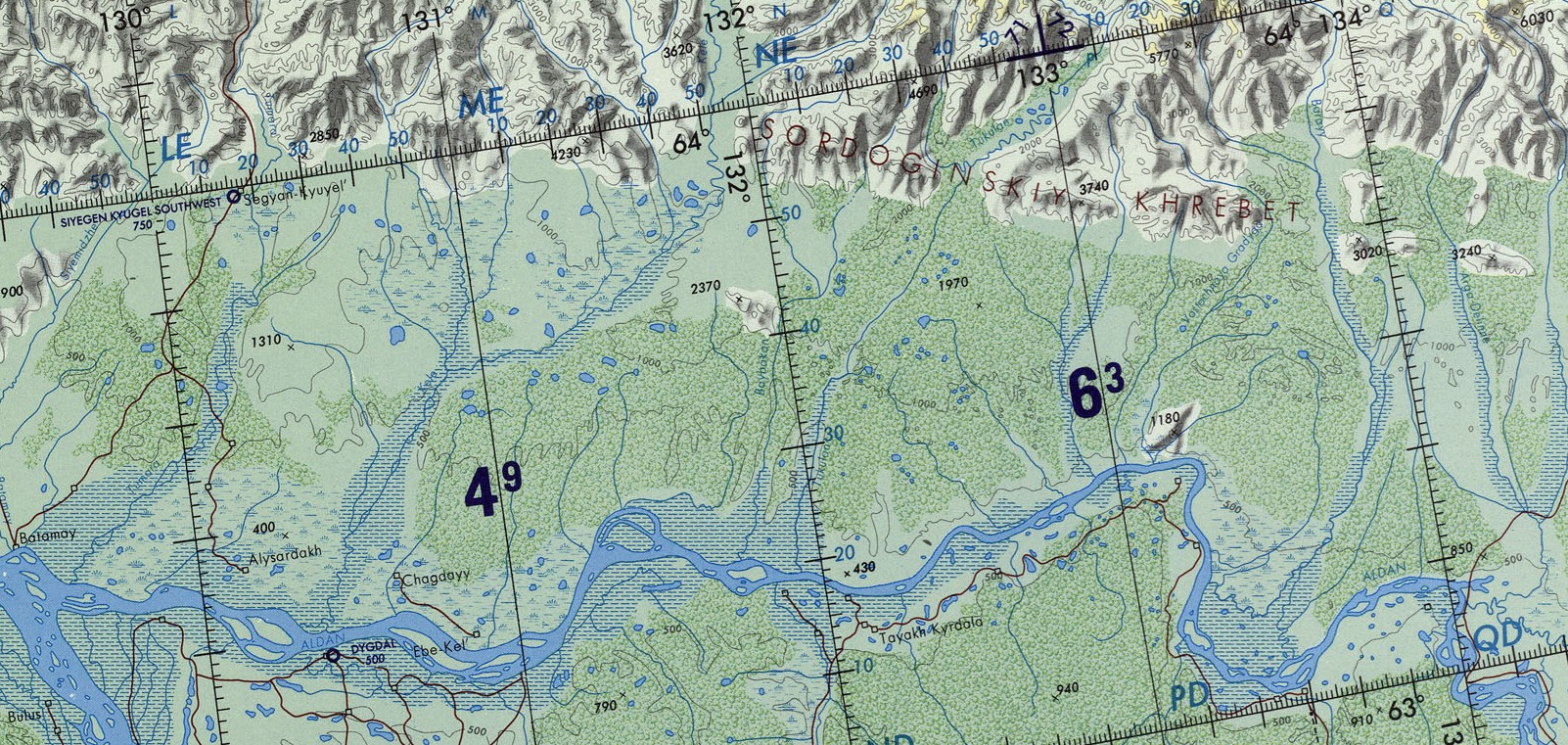
- Last stretch of the Aldan with the Tumara on the left.

- Mouth location in Yakutia, Russia

Location
- Country: Russian Federation

Physical characteristics
- Source: Verkhoyansk Range
  - coordinates: 64°53′14″N 130°27′36″E
- Mouth: Aldan River
  - coordinates: 63°27′34″N 129°34′49″E
- Length: 236 km (147 mi)
- Basin size: 10,300 km^{2} (4,000 sq mi)
- Discharge
  - average: 67 m^{3}/s (2,400 cu ft/s)

Basin features
- Progression: Aldan→ Lena→ Laptev Sea

The Tumara (Russian: Тумара; Yakut: Тумара) is a river in the Sakha Republic (Yakutia), Russia, a right tributary of the Aldan, part of the Lena basin. It flows across an area that is largely desolate, except for Segyan-Kyuyol village. The Tumara has a length of 236 kilometres (147 mi) and a drainage basin area of 10,300 square kilometres (4,000 mi^{2}). The river is a destination for rafting.

The name of the river comes from the Yakut language tumara, meaning "tundra".

== Course ==
The Tumara originates in the slopes of the southwestern Verkhoyansk Range. In the upper section of its course the river displays all the characteristics of a mountain river, flowing roughly southwards within a deep and narrow valley bound by steep slopes that cuts across the Kelter (Көлтөр) and Munni (Мунний) ranges.

After leaving the mountainous area in its middle course the Tumara flows through a floodplain and forms meanders, still following a generally southward direction. In its lower course the river expands and the floodplain becomes wider, its riverbed dividing into slowly-flowing arms. Finally the Tumara meets the right bank of the Aldan River, a little upstream from Batamay and downstream from river Kele.

Its longest tributaries are the 110 km (68 mi) long Nuora (right) and the 78 km (48 mi) long Nyorkyunde.

Basin of the Lena with the Tumara River in the upper right.

== See also ==
- List of rivers of Russia
- List of fossiliferous stratigraphic units in Russia
