= Batamay =

Batamay (Russian: Батамай) is the name of several rural localities in the Sakha Republic, Russia:

- Batamay, Kobyaysky District, Sakha Republic, a selo in Kirovsky Rural Okrug of Kobyaysky District
- Batamay, Lensky District, Sakha Republic, a selo in Saldykelsky Rural Okrug of Lensky District

== Other uses ==
- Batamay (river), a river in Kobyaysky District, Sakha
