= Dyanyshka =

Dyanyshka Yakut: Дээнискэ Kobycha
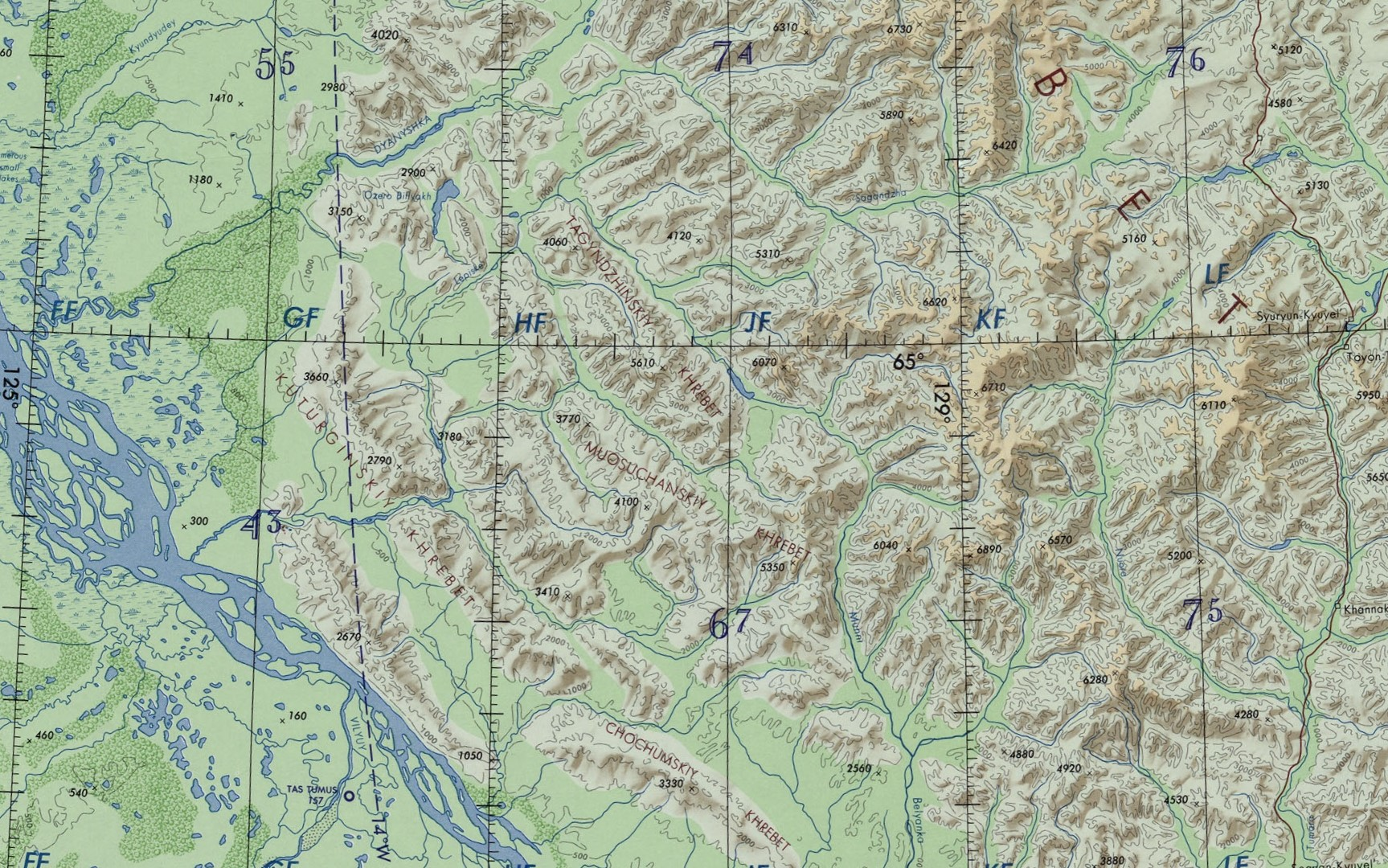
- ONC chart section with the Dyanyshka in the upper left

- Mouth location in Yakutia, Russia

Location
- Country: Russia

Physical characteristics
- Source
  - location: Verkhoyansk Range, confluence of rivers Dektende and Birandya
  - coordinates: 65°46′44″N 128°58′23″E
  - elevation: 655 m (2,149 ft)
- Mouth: Lena
  - coordinates: 64°59′44″N 124°58′37″E
  - elevation: 47 m (154 ft)
- Length: 332 km (206 mi)
- Basin size: 13,300 km^{2} (5,100 sq mi)
- Discharge
  - average: 80 m^{3}/s (2,800 cu ft/s)

Basin features
- Progression: Lena→ Laptev Sea

The Dyanyshka (Russian: Дянышка; Yakut: Дээнискэ, Deeniske), also known as Kobycha (Russian: Кобыча), is a river in the Kobyaysky District of the Sakha Republic (Yakutia), Russia. It is the 28th longest tributary of the Lena, with a length of 332 kilometres (206 mi) or 295 kilometres (183 mi) according to other sources, and a drainage basin area of 13,300 square kilometres (5,100 mi^{2}). There are no settlements in the area of the Dyanyshka.

The river is located in the Ust-Vilyui Natural Park area. Whitefish, lenok, pike and taimen, among other species, are abundant in the waters of the river. On the International scale of river difficulty the Dyanyshka is a Class II - IV destination for rafting and kayaking.

== Course ==
The Dyanyshka is a right tributary of the Lena and flows across mountainous terrain all along its upper course. It forms at an altitude of roughly 655 m (2,149 ft) at the confluence of rivers Dektende and Birandya, the latter having its source in the Echysky Massif, one of the subranges of the Verkhoyansk Range at the southern end of the Orulgan Range. The river flows roughly southwestwards all along its course cutting across the Selenchan Range and flanking the northwestern end of the Tagindzhin, Muosuchan and Bygyn ranges through a wide valley in its middle course with the northern end of the Kuturgin Range rising not far off its left bank.

The river meanders and splits in slow-flowing arms already 130 km (81 mi) from its mouth. In its last stretch it flows across a flat area at the edge of the Central Yakutian Lowland where there are many small lakes and marshes. Finally the Dyanyshka joins the right bank of the Lena 990 km (620 mi) from its mouth. The river freezes yearly in mid-October and opens in late May or early June. It freezes to the bottom in its upper course. The river basin has 40 ice fields with a total area of approximately 28 square kilometres (11 sq mi).

River Dyanyshka has 54 tributaries with a length of more than 10 km. Its main tributary is the 179 km (111 mi) long Sagandzha (Саганджа), also known as Byutei-Yurekh (Бютэй-Юрэх), joining it from the left below the northern flank of the Tagindzhin Range.

Basin of the Lena

== See also ==
- List of rivers of Russia
