= Belyanka (river) =

River in Yakutia, Russia

Belyanka Белянка / Белянка
- Mouth location in Yakutia, Russia

Location
- Country: Russia

Physical characteristics
- Source
  - location: Munni Range
  - coordinates: 64°15′33″N 128°46′32″E
  - elevation: ca 169 m (554 ft)
- Mouth: Lena
  - coordinates: 63°30′49″N 128°49′50″E
- Length: 114 km (71 mi)
- Basin size: 4,560 square kilometres (1,760 mi^{2})

Basin features
- Progression: Lena→ Laptev Sea

The Belyanka (Russian: Белянка; Yakut: Белянка) is a river in the Sakha Republic (Yakutia), Russia, a right tributary of the Lena. It has a length of 114 kilometres (71 mi) —217 kilometres (135 mi) counting the Munni at its head— and a drainage basin area of 4,560 square kilometres (1,760 mi^{2}).

There are no settlements in the basin of the river. The nearest village is Batamay, located to the east of its mouth in the Lena.

== Course ==
The Belyanka originates in the Munni Range at the confluence of rivers Munni from the west and Tagyndzha from the east in the southwestern area of the Verkhoyansk Range. The Munni flows from the slopes of the Tagindzhin Range and its valley is bound by the eastern end of the Muosuchan Range.

In the upper section of its course the Belyanka river cuts across the mountainous terrain of the Sorkin Range heading roughly southwards in a narrow valley. Soon it leaves the mountainous area and flows southwards flowing slowly and dividing into branches across the Central Yakutian Lowland in a wide floodplain. Close to its last stretch there are lakes and marshes. Finally the Belyanka meets the right bank of the Lena 1,277 kilometres (793 mi) from its mouth, a little upstream from Sangar and downstream of the mouth of the Batamay and the confluence of the Aldan.

The river freezes between mid October and the end of May.

== Fauna ==
The waters of the Belyanka are very clear. Lenok, taimen, grayling and whitefish are among the fish species found in the river.

== See also ==
- List of rivers of Russia
