= Undyulyung =

River in Sakha Republic, Russia

Undyulyung Yakut: Үндүлүҥ
- Basin of the Lena with the Undyulyung in the upper right

- Mouth location in Yakutia, Russia

Location
- Country: Russia

Physical characteristics
- Source
  - location: Orulgan Range; Verkhoyansk Range
  - coordinates: 65°57′47″N 128°29′36″E
- Mouth: Lena
  - coordinates: 66°14′10″N 123°50′05″E
- Length: 414 km (257 mi)
- Basin size: 12,800 km^{2} (4,900 sq mi)
- Discharge
  - average: 135 m^{3}/s (4,800 cu ft/s)

Basin features
- Progression: Lena→ Laptev Sea

The Undyulyung (Russian: Ундюлюнг; Yakut: Үндүлүҥ, Ündülüŋ) is a river in Sakha Republic (Yakutia), Russia. It is the 19th longest tributary of the Lena, with a length of 414 kilometres (257 mi) and a drainage basin area of 12,800 square kilometres (4,900 mi^{2}). There are no settlements close to the river.

A great number of fish species are found in the waters of the Undyulyung, including lenok, taimen, whitefish, perch, grayling, pike, ide, as well as the endangered Lena sturgeon. The river is a suitable destination for rafting.

== History ==
On 11 September 1986 a meteorite fell at the mouth of the Byukyakh (Бюкээх), a right tributary of the Undyulyung. The fall was observed by a helicopter crew.

== Course ==
The Undyulyung is a right tributary of the Lena. Its source is located in the southern sector of the Orulgan Range, west of the Echysky Massif. Its valley flanks the southern end of the Byrandia Range in its upper course and the southern side of the Kuyellyakh Range further downstream. The smaller Undyulyung Range rises on its right side 75 km (47 mi) upstream from the mouth in the Lena river. In its first section the river flows across mountainous terrain forming rapids. After leaving the mountains it flows into the Central Yakutian Lowland, splitting into two arms shortly before it joins the right bank of the Lena 820 km (510 mi) from its mouth. The river is surrounded by mountain tundra with shrub thickets and subalpine forests landscapes in its upper reaches. In its lower course there are sparse forests with Dahurian larch.

The longest tributaries of the Undyulyung are the 91 km (57 mi) long Byukyakh and the 140 km (87 mi) long Tyrekhtyakh on the right, as well as the 81 km (50 mi) long Dabdzha on the left. The river freezes in October and stays under ice until May. Floods are common in the summer season. There are ice fields in the river basin with a total area of 23 km^{2} (8.9 sq mi).

== See also ==
- List of rivers of Russia
