= Orulgan Range =

Mountains in Russia

- Орулган / Орулҕан
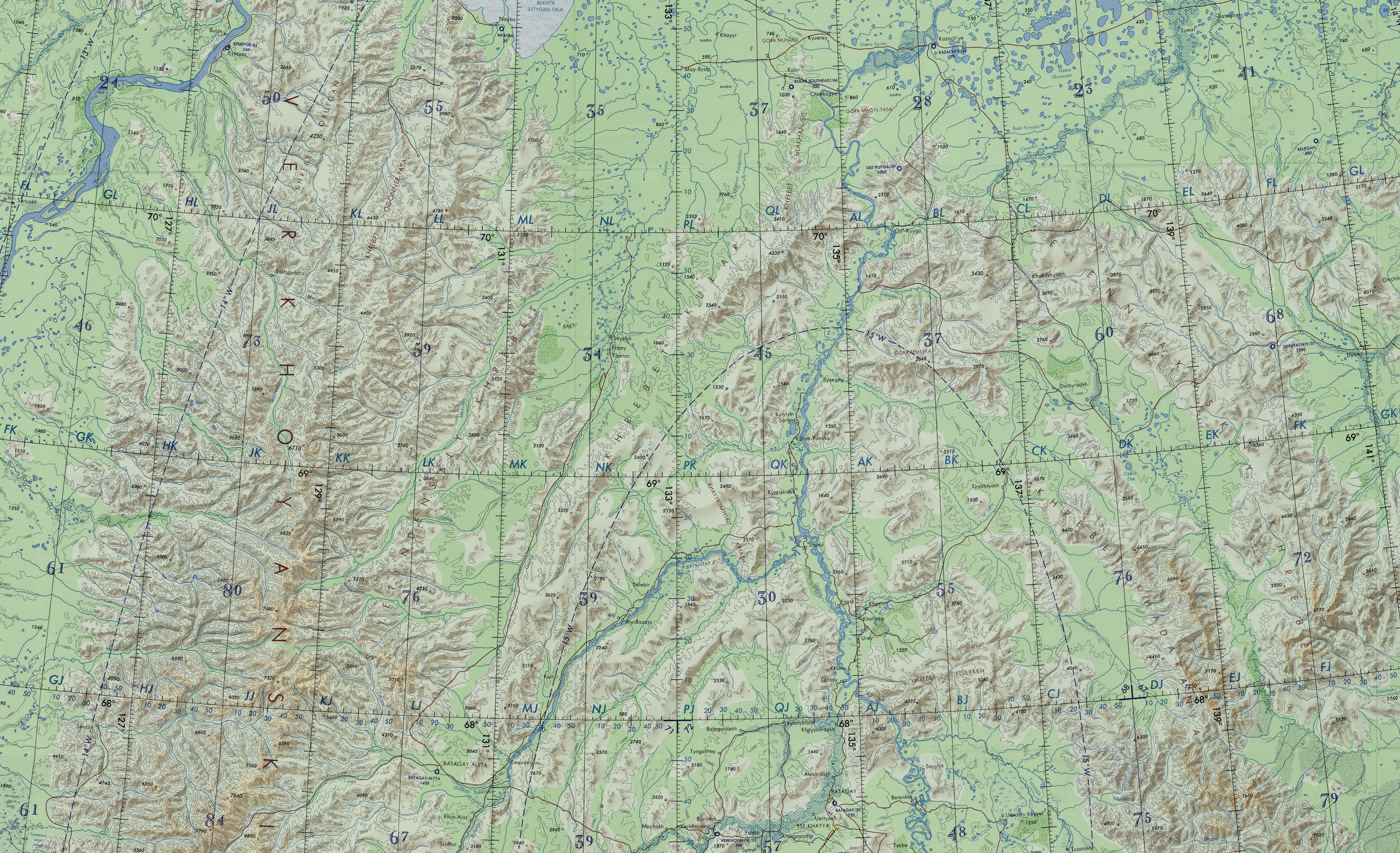
- ONC chart section showing the Orulgan Range on the left

Highest point
- Peak: Unnamed
- Elevation: 2,409 m (7,904 ft)
- Coordinates: 67°34′56″N 128°08′41″E

Dimensions
- Length: 500 km (310 mi) N / S

Geography
- Location within Sakha Republic
- Location: Sakha Republic, Far Eastern Federal District
- Parent range: Verkhoyansk Range, East Siberian System

Geology
- Rock type(s): Shale, sandstone, limestone

Climbing
- Easiest route: From Batagay-Alyta

The Orulgan Range (Russian: Орулган; Yakut: Орулҕан, Orulğan) is a range of mountains in far northeastern Russia. Administratively, the range is part of the Sakha Republic, Russian Federation.

== History ==
In 1932 Soviet geologist Ivan Atlasov, professor of the Arctic and Antarctic Research Institute, carried out geological surveys in Yakutia. He explored and mapped most of the Orulgan Range between the 69th and 67th parallel north, correctly determining the direction and total length of the mountain chain.

== Geography ==
The Orulgan Range is the largest subrange of the Verkhoyansk Range system. It is located in its northern section, running along the main ridge, stretching southwards to the south of the Kharaulakh Range. The Dzhardzhan Range rises to the west and the Sietinden Range to the east, running in a roughly parallel direction, while the smaller Byrandia Range and Kuyellyakh Range rise in the southeast near its southern end.

The highest point of the Orulgan Range is an unnamed 2,283-metre (7,490 ft)-high peak located in its central section. It is an ultra-prominent summit, and one of the highest peaks of the Verkhoyansk Range. The range has 77 mountain glaciers with a total area of approximately 18 square kilometres (6.9 sq mi). The largest glacier is Kolosov Glacier, with an area of 4.4 square kilometres (1.7 sq mi).

=== Hydrography ===
The Orulgan Range is deeply cut by riverine intermontane basins with the Undyulyung, Uel Siktyakh, Begidyan, Sobolokh-Mayan, Menkere, Dzhardzhan, Byosyuke, Tikyan, and other right tributaries of the Lena River flowing westwards. To the east flow the Omoloy and its Sietinde, Kuranakh-Yuryakh, and Arga-Yuryakh left tributaries, as well as the Bytantay, a left tributary of the Yana River.

== Flora ==
The mountain slopes of the Orulgan are covered with sparse larch forests up to heights between 1,000 metres (3,300 ft) and 1,200 metres (3,900 ft), and with rocky mountain tundra at higher elevations.

== See also ==
- List of mountains and hills of Russia
- List of ultras of Northeast Asia
- Orulganitidae
