= Tikyan =

River in Russia

Tikyan Тикян / Тиикээн
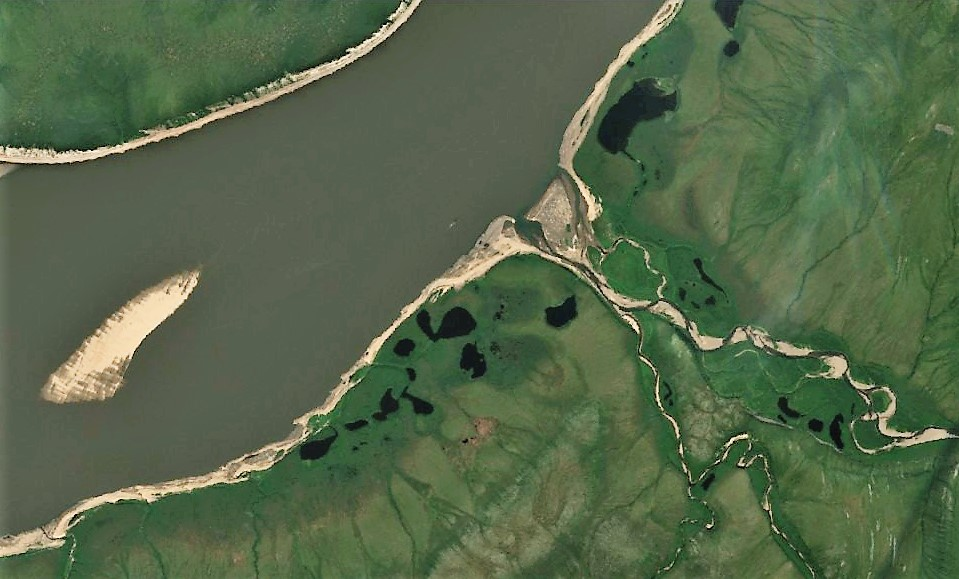
- Mouth of the Tikyan in the Lena Sentinel-2 image

- Mouth location in Yakutia, Russia

Location
- Country: Russia

Physical characteristics
- Source
  - location: Orulgan Range; Verkhoyansk Range
- Mouth: Lena
  - coordinates: 70°31′36″N 127°06′05″E
- Length: 119 km (74 mi)
- Basin size: 1,640 km^{2} (630 sq mi)

Basin features
- Progression: Lena→ Laptev Sea

The Tikyan (Russian: Тикян; Yakut: Тиикээн) is a river in the Sakha Republic (Yakutia), Russia. It is one of the northernmost tributaries of the Lena. The river has a length of 119 kilometres (74 mi) and a drainage basin area of 1,640 square kilometres (630 mi^{2}).

The river flows north of the Arctic Circle across desolate areas of Bulunsky District. The nearest inhabited place is Kyusyur, located on the banks of the Lena, about 20 km (12 mi) northeast of its mouth.

== Course ==
The Tikyan is a right tributary of the Lena. It originates on the western flank of the northern end of the Orulgan Range, Verkhoyansk Range system. It flows roughly northwestwards, parallel to the Byosyuke. After leaving the mountain area, it bends to the NNW and forms meanders within a floodplain. In its final stretch it bends westwards and joins the right bank of the Lena 232 km (144 mi) from its mouth.

The longest tributaries of the Tikyan are the 72 kilometres (45 mi) long Abalakhaan from the left and the 54 kilometres (34 mi) long Kyundyukeen from the right.

== See also ==
- List of rivers of Russia
