= Siktyakh =

Siktyakh Сиктях Сииктээх (Sakha)
- Selo
- Interactive map of Siktyakh
- Location of Siktyakh Siktyakh (Sakha Republic)
- Coordinates: 69°55′N 125°06′E
- Country: Russia
- Federal subject: Sakha Republic
- Administrative district: Bulunsky District
- Rural okrugSelsoviet: Siktyakhsky Rural Okrug
- Founded: 1934

Population (2010 Census)
  - Total: 287
  - Estimate (January 2016): 300 (+4.5%)

Administrative status
  - Capital of: Siktyakhsky Rural Okrug

Municipal status
  - Municipal district: Bulunsky Municipal District
  - Rural settlement: Siktyakhsky Rural Settlement
  - Capital of: Siktyakhsky Rural Settlement
- Time zone: UTC+
- Postal code: 678421
- OKTMO ID: 98612427101

Siktyakh (Russian: Сиктях; Yakut: Сииктээх, Siikteex) is a rural locality (a selo), the only inhabited locality, and the administrative center of Siktyakhsky Rural Okrug of Bulunsky District in the Sakha Republic, Russia, located 230 kilometers (140 mi) from Tiksi, the administrative center of the district. Its population as of the 2010 Census was 287, up from 254 recorded during the 2002 Census.

Historical population
Year	Pop.	±%
1989	300	—
2002	254	−15.3%
2010	287	+13.0%
2021	280	−2.4%
Source: Census data

== Geography ==
Siktyakh is located on the left bank of the Lena, north of the Arctic Circle. Rivers Kuranakh-Siktyakh and Uel-Siktyakh have their mouths nearby on the facing bank.
