= Amedichi =

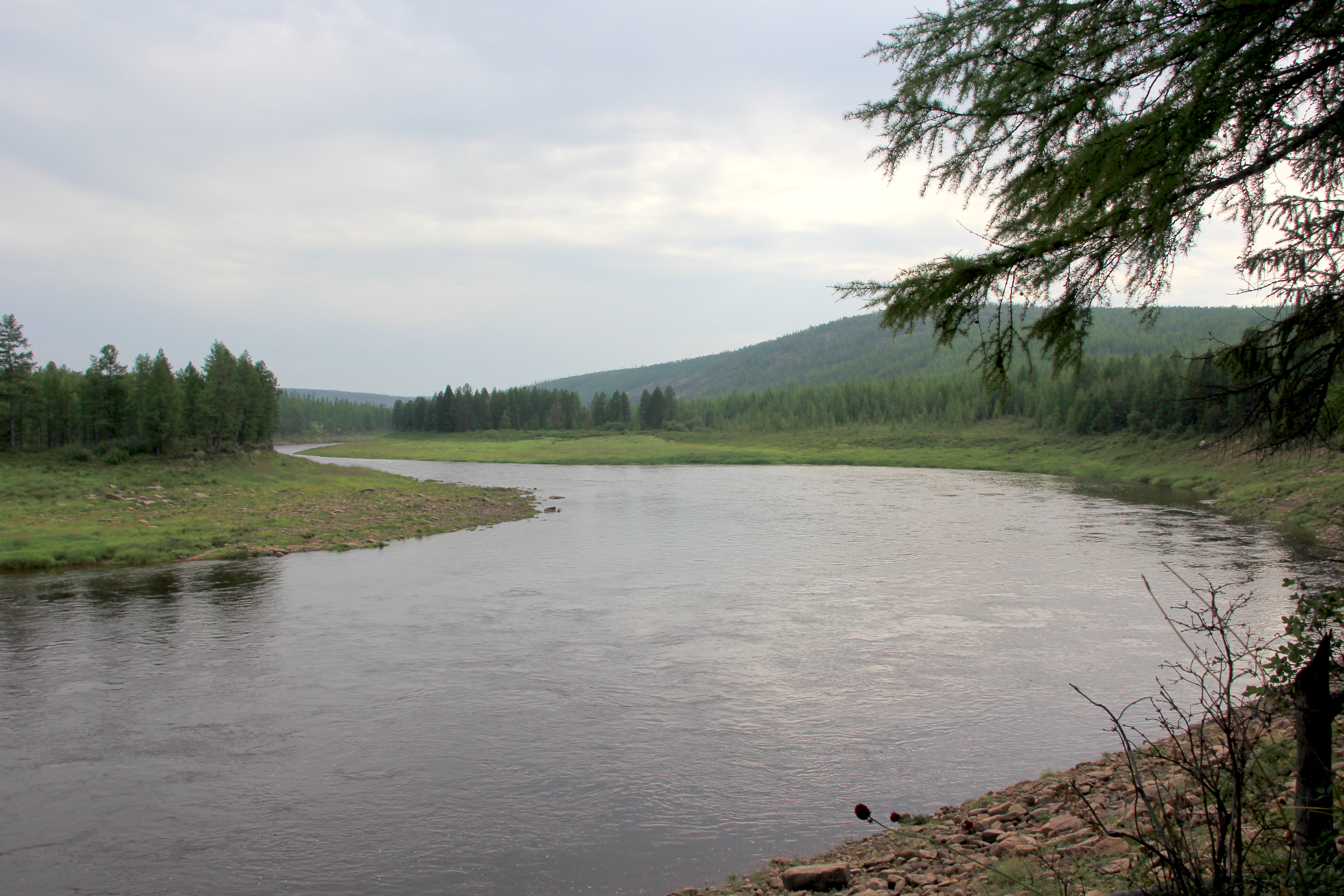

- Mouth location in Yakutia, Russia

Location
- Country: Russia

Physical characteristics
- Mouth: Aldan
  - coordinates: 57°55′56″N 123°43′17″E
- Length: 313 km (194 mi)
- Basin size: 6,020 km^{2} (2,320 sq mi)

Basin features
- Progression: Aldan→ Lena→ Laptev Sea

The Amedichi (Russian: Амедичи; Yakut: Амедичи, Amediçi) is a river of Sakha Republic, Russia, a left tributary of the Aldan. It is 313 kilometres (194 mi) long, and has a drainage basin of 6,020 square kilometres (2,320 sq mi).

== See also ==
- List of rivers of Russia
