= Kharaulakh Range =

Mountain range in Russia

- Хараулахский хребет
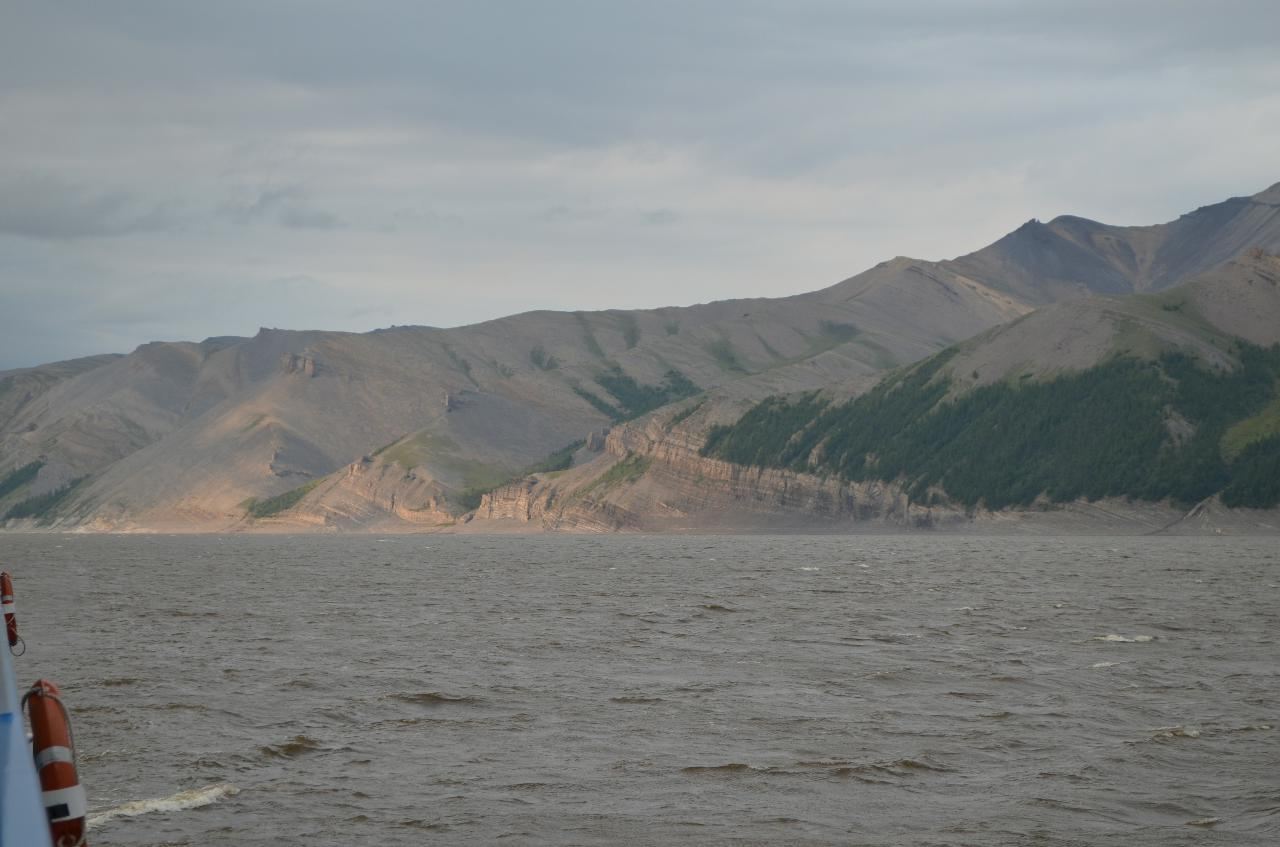
- View of the Tuora Sis, at the western edge of the Kharaulakh Range rising above the Lena waters.

Highest point
- Peak: Unnamed
- Elevation: 1,429 m (4,688 ft)
- Coordinates: 71°44′N 128°16′E

Dimensions
- Length: 350 km (220 mi) NNW/SSE

Geography
- Location within Far Eastern Federal District
- Location: Sakha, Russian Far East
- Parent range: Verkhoyansk Range

Geology
- Orogeny: Alpine orogeny
- Rock type(s): Sandstone, shale, mudstone and volcanic rocks

The Kharaulakh Range (Russian: Хараулахский хребет, Yakut: Хара Уулаах) is a range of mountains in far North-eastern Russia. Administratively the range is part of the Sakha Republic of the Russian Federation. The area of the range is largely uninhabited.

== Geography ==
The Kharaulakh Range is located by the Lena River in its last stretch before its delta. The Chekanovsky Ridge rises above the facing bank of the Lena. It is one of the subranges of the northern end of the Verkhoyansk Range, part of the East Siberian System of mountains. the Orulgan Range, a higher mountain chain, stretches to the south.

The Kharaulakh Range has two subranges running parallel to the main mountain chain, the Tuora-Sis Range to the west by the shores of the Lena, and the Kunga Range at the eastern flank. The highest point of the range is an unnamed peak reaching 1,429 metres (4,688 ft).

== See also ==
- Ust-Vilyuy Range
