= Byosyuke =

River in Russia

Byosyuke Бёсюке / Бөөһүкэ
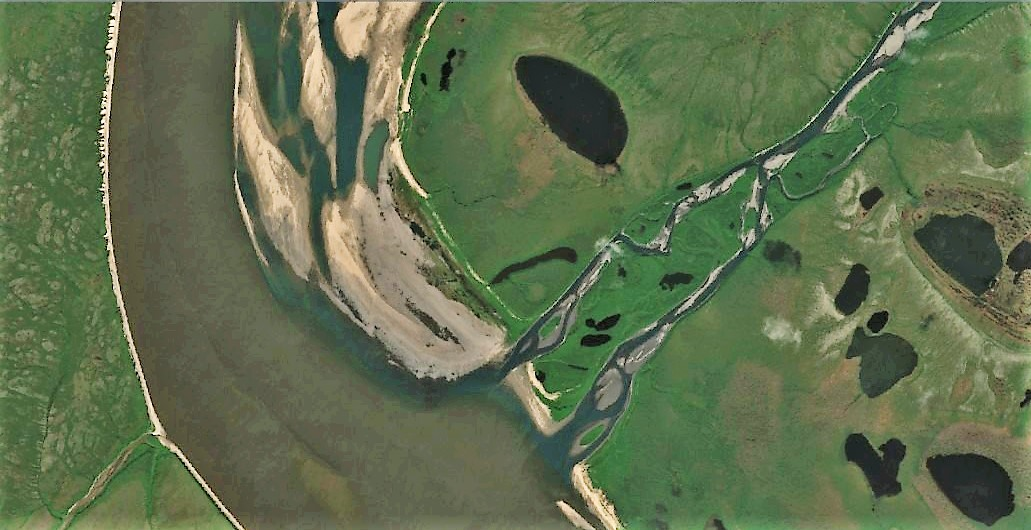
- Mouths of the Byosyuke in the Lena Sentinel-2 image

- Mouth location in Yakutia, Russia

Location
- Country: Russia

Physical characteristics
- Source
  - location: Confluence of Meychan and Sakhandya; Orulgan Range; Verkhoyansk Range
  - coordinates: 69°46′16″N 128°12′54″E
  - elevation: 301 m (988 ft)
- Mouth: Lena
  - coordinates: 70°21′05″N 125°54′35″E
  - elevation: 10 m (33 ft)
- Length: 152 km (94 mi) —263 km (163 mi) from the source of the Sakhandya
- Basin size: 5,780 km^{2} (2,230 sq mi)

Basin features
- Progression: Lena→ Laptev Sea

The Byosyuke (Russian: Бёсюке; Yakut: Бөөһүкэ) is a river in the Sakha Republic (Yakutia), Russia. It is one of the northernmost tributaries of the Lena. The river has a length of 152 kilometres (94 mi) —263 km (163 mi) from the source of the Sakhandya— and a drainage basin area of 5,780 square kilometres (2,230 mi^{2}).

The river flows north of the Arctic Circle across desolate areas of Bulunsky District. The nearest inhabited place is Kyusyur, located on the banks of the Lena, over 60 km (37 mi) northeast of its mouth. The Byosyuke is a destination for game fishing tours.

== Course ==
The Byosyuke is a right tributary of the Lena. It has its origin on the western flank of the northern end of the Orulgan Range, Verkhoyansk Range system. The Byosyuke is formed at the confluence of the Meychan and Sakhandya rivers. It flows roughly northwestwards, parallel to the Tikyan, skirting the northern limit of the Dzhardzhan Range and descending into a floodplain in its middle course. Towards the end it bends westwards and then southwestwards, forking into two in its last stretch and joining the right bank of the Lena 296 km (184 mi) from its mouth.

The longest tributary of the Byosyuke is the 152 kilometres (94 mi) long Meychan (Мэйчээн) from the right.

Lena basin with the Byosyuke in the upper right

== See also ==
- List of rivers of Russia
