= Ust-Vilyuy Range =

Mountain range in Russia

- Усть-Вилюйский / Уус Бүлүү
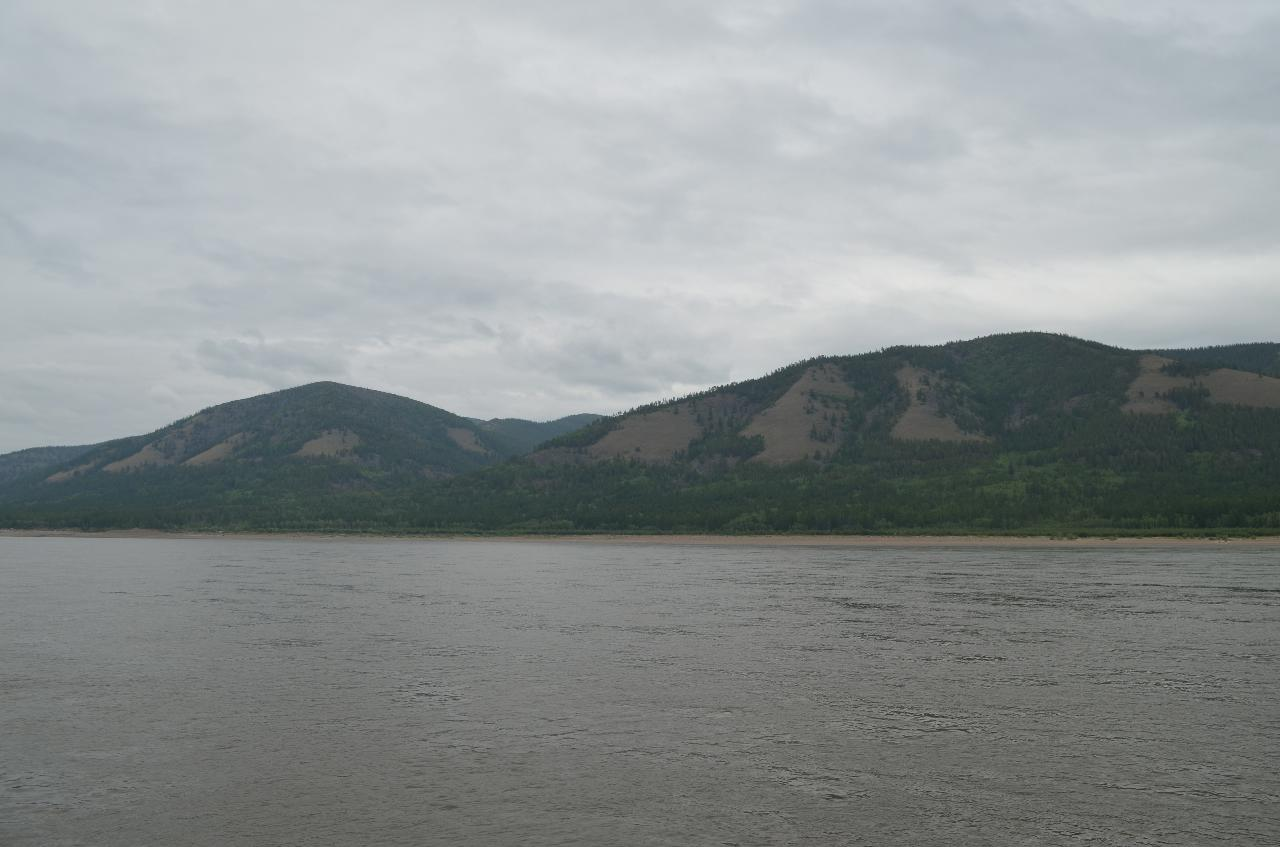
- View of the western slopes of the range rising above the waters of the Lena.

Highest point
- Peak: Unnamed
- Elevation: 998 m (3,274 ft)
- Coordinates: 64°35′N 126°30′E

Dimensions
- Length: 65 km (40 mi) NW/SE
- Width: 17 km (11 mi) NE/SW

Geography
- Location within Far Eastern Federal District
- Location: Sakha, Russian Far East
- Parent range: Verkhoyansk Range

Geology
- Orogeny: Alpine orogeny

The Ust-Vilyuy Range (Russian: Хребет Усть-Вилюйский, Yakut: Уус Бүлүү, romanized: Uus Bülüü) is a range of mountains in North-eastern Russia. Administratively the range is part of the Sakha Republic of the Russian Federation. The area of the range is largely uninhabited, there are only some abandoned villages.

== Geography ==
The Ust-Vilyuy Range is a subrange of the Verkhoyansk Range, part of the East Siberian System of mountains. It rises in the southwestern side of the Verkhoyansk Range, above the eastern bank of the Lena River, opposite the mouth of the Vilyuy River in the Lena's western bank, at the edge of the Central Yakutian Lowland. The highest point of the range is an unnamed peak reaching 998 metres (3,274 ft). According to other sources it is 813 metres (2,667 ft) high.

The range runs parallel to the Kuturgin Range, a higher mountain chain that rises to the northeast, beyond which stretches the Bygyn Range. The northwestern end of the Chochum Range, which extends further southeastwards, rises off the eastern end of the Ust-Vilyuy Range. River Lyapiske, a tributary of the Lena, flows into its right bank at the northwestern limit of the range.

== Flora and fauna ==
The slopes of the mountains are smooth and are covered with larch taiga. Among the animals found in the region are elk, sable, muskrat, wild reindeer, brown bear, wolverine, black grouse, Western capercaillie, white-tailed eagle, hazel grouse, snow sheep, golden eagle, peregrine falcon, black-capped marmot, brent goose and whooper swan. 999,221 hectares (2,469,130 acres) of the range are a protected area, the Ust-Vilyui Natural Park.

== See also ==
- Kharaulakh Range
