= Baray (river) =

Baray Барайы
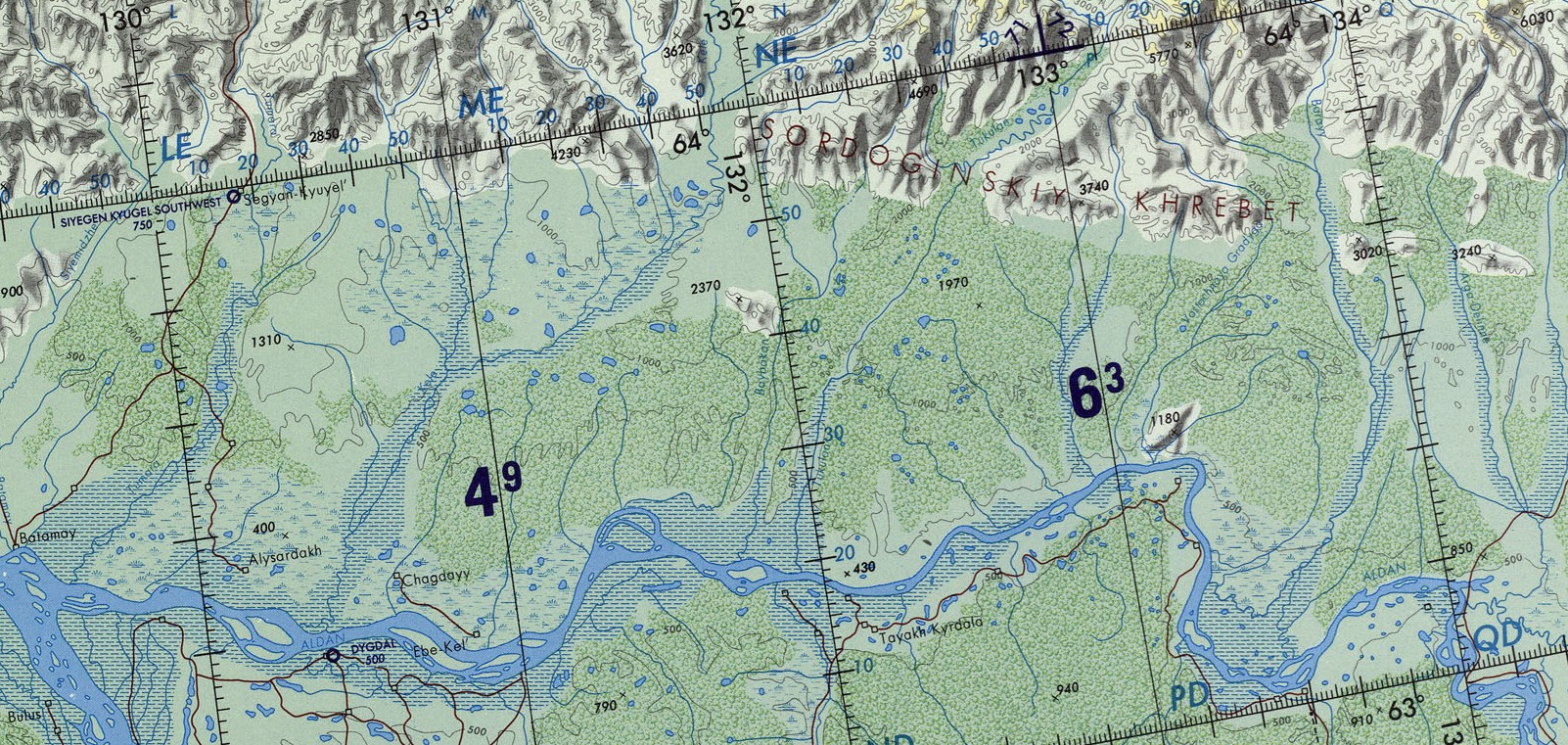
- Sordogin Range and course of the Baray

- Mouth location in Yakutia, Russia

Location
- Country: Russian Federation

Physical characteristics
- Source: Lake Ulakhan-Kyuel, Verkhoyansk Range
- Mouth: Aldan River
  - coordinates: 63°12′12″N 133°13′58″E
- Length: 251 km (156 mi)
- Basin size: 4,880 km^{2} (1,880 sq mi)

Basin features
- Progression: Aldan→ Lena→ Laptev Sea

The Baray (Russian: Барайы; Yakut: Барайы, Barayı) is a river in the Sakha Republic (Yakutia), Russia, a right tributary of the Aldan, part of the Lena basin.

The Baray has a length of 251 kilometres (156 mi) and a drainage basin area of 4,880 square kilometres (1,880 mi^{2}). There are no settlements in the area of the river. The nearest inhabited places are Udarnik, Krest-Khaldzhay and Ary-Tolon of Tompo District to the east of the river's mouth.

== Course ==
The Baray originates in the southwestern Verkhoyansk Range, near the source of the Nelgese and not far west of the Khunkhadin Range. In the upper section of its course the river flows across mountainous terrain, heading roughly southwards and flanking the eastern end of the Sordogin Range.

After leaving the mountainous area the Baray turns slightly and flows in a roughly SW direction across a floodplain dotted with about 130 lakes. Finally the Baray meets the right bank of the Aldan River in a vast swampy area where it makes a sharp westward bend, a little upstream from the mouth of the Tukulan and downstream of the Tompo, 240 km (150 mi) from the confluence of the Aldan with the Lena. Its mouth is near the mouth of the Tatta on the facing bank.

The Baray has about 27 tributaries having a length of more than 10 km (6.2 mi). The main tributary is the 50 km (31 mi) long Taalchaan (Таалчаан) joining it from the right side 169 km (105 mi) from its mouth. The Baray freezes in mid-October and stays frozen until the end of May.

Basin of the Lena with the Baray River in the upper right

== See also ==
- List of rivers of Russia
