= Dzhardzhan Range =

Mountain range in Russia

- Джарджанский хребет / Дьардьаан
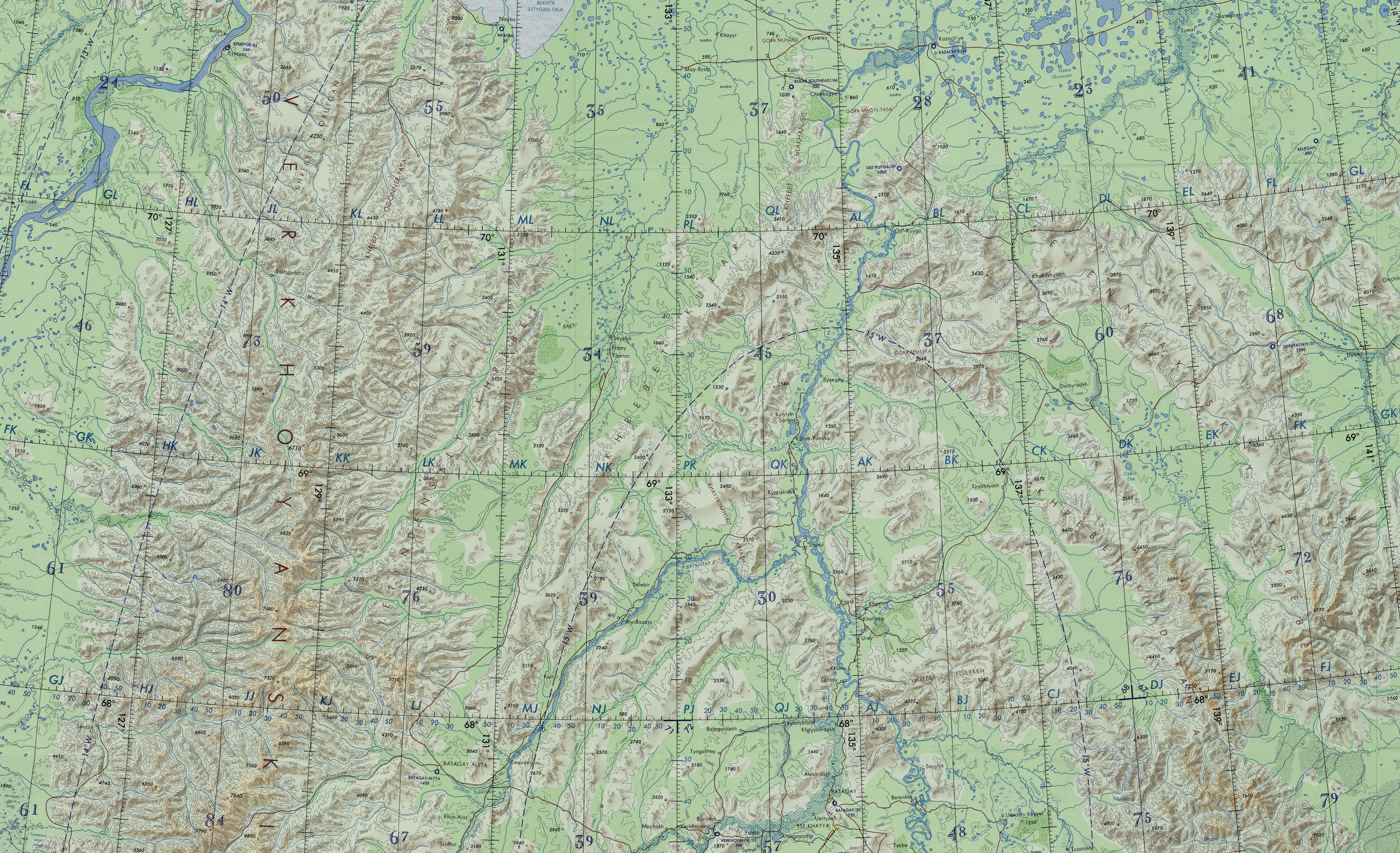
- ONC chart section showing the Dzhardzhan Range on the far left

Highest point
- Peak: Unnamed
- Elevation: 1,925 m (6,316 ft)
- Coordinates: 68°45′N 127°0′E

Dimensions
- Length: 200 km (120 mi) N / S

Geography
- Location within Sakha Republic
- Location: Sakha Republic, Far Eastern Federal District
- Parent range: Verkhoyansk Range, East Siberian System

Geology
- Rock type(s): Shale, sandstone, limestone

The Dzhardzhan Range (Russian: Джарджанский хребет; Yakut: Дьардьаан, Carcaan) is a range of mountains in far North-eastern Russia. Administratively the range is part of the Sakha Republic, Russian Federation.

== Geography ==
The Dzhardzhan Range is one of the subranges of the Verkhoyansk Range system and is located in its northern section. It stretches from north to south between the Lena River to the west and the higher Orulgan Range to the east, running in a roughly parallel direction to it. The highest point of the range is an unnamed 1,925 metres (6,316 ft) high peak. River Dzhardzhan cuts across the range in its middle section.

=== Hydrography ===
Rivers with their sources in the more massive Orulgan rising to the east cut across the Dzhardzhan Range through steep gorges and ravines. They are right tributaries of the Lena River flowing westwards, such as the Natara, Uel-Siktyakh and Kuranakh-Siktyakh. The Byosyuke flows in its northern limit while the valleys of the Syncha and Nelon, the two rivers which form the Menkere, are at its southern end.

== Flora ==
The mountain slopes are covered with larch taiga and the valleys with tundra.

== See also ==
- List of mountains and hills of Russia
