= Munni Range =

Mountain range in Russia

- Муннийский Хребет / Мунньи сис
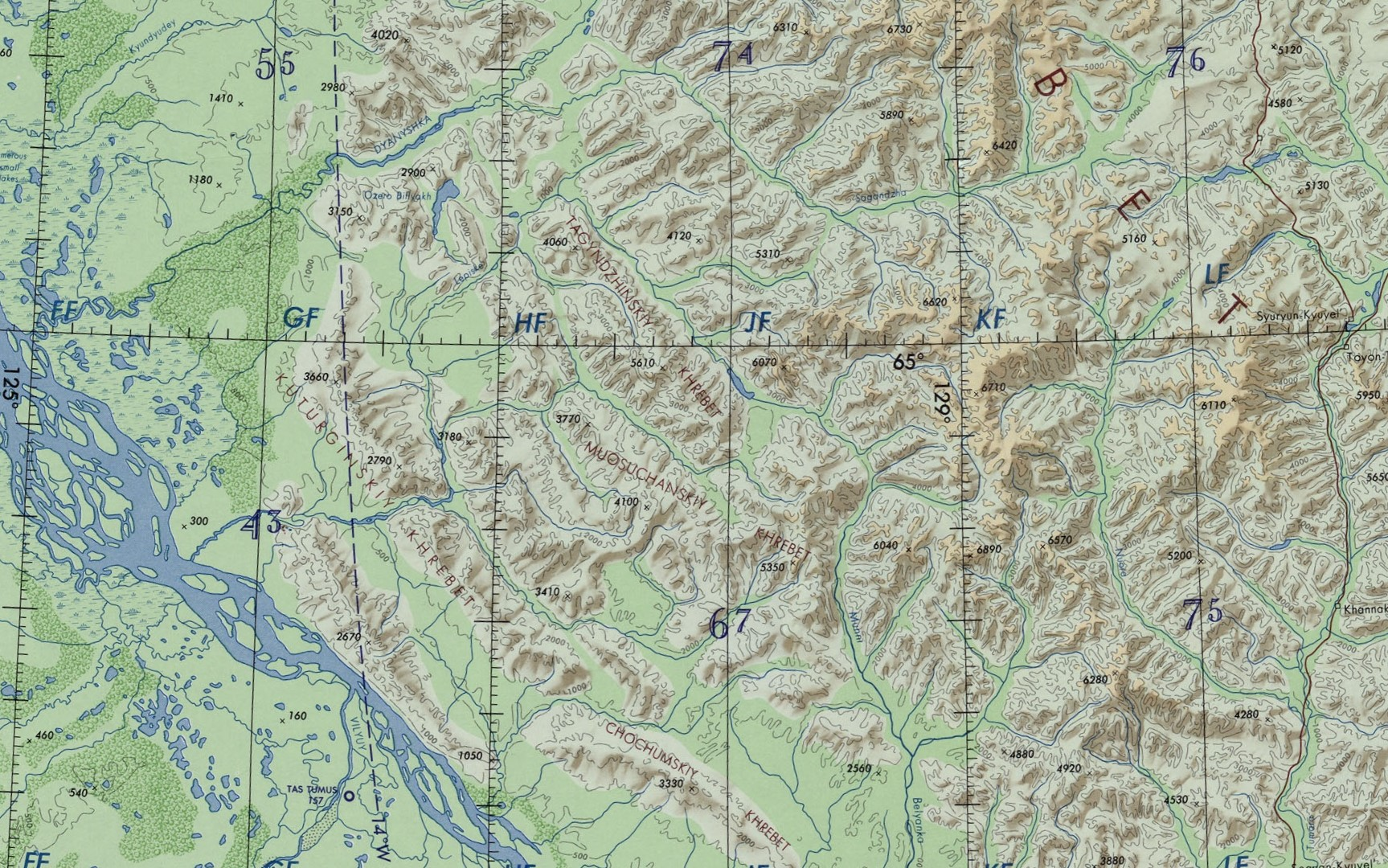
- ONC chart section showing the SW section of the Verkhoyansk Range

Highest point
- Peak: Unnamed
- Elevation: 1,784 m (5,853 ft)
- Coordinates: 64°28′N 128°50′E

Dimensions
- Length: 160 km (99 mi) NW / SE
- Width: 35 km (22 mi) NE/ SW

Geography
- Location within Sakha Republic
- Location: Sakha Republic, Far Eastern Federal District
- Parent range: Verkhoyansk Range, East Siberian System

Geology
- Orogeny: Alpine orogeny
- Rock type(s): Shale, sandstone, limestone

Climbing
- Easiest route: From Segyan-Kyuyol, Kobyaysky District

The Munni Range (Russian: Муннийский Хребет; Yakut: Мунньи сис) is a range of mountains in far North-eastern Russia. Administratively the range is part of the Sakha Republic, Russian Federation.

== Geography ==
The Munni Range is one of the subranges of the Verkhoyansk Range system and is located in its southwestern section. It stretches roughly from northwest to southeast between the Kelter Range to the north and the Sorkin Range to the southwest, running in a roughly parallel direction to both ranges. The western end is bound by the valleys of the Munni (a tributary of the Belyanka) and the Buruolakh (a tributary of the (Lyapiske), beyond which rise the Muosuchan and the Bygyn Range stretching northwestwards.

River Tumara cuts across the range roughly in its central part and Segyan-Kyuyol village lies on its right bank, below the southern slopes of the mountainside. The highest point of the Munni Range is an unnamed 1,784 metres (5,853 ft) high peak located at the northern end. The Sordogin Range stretches eastwards beyond the valley of river Kele, at the eastern end of the range.

== See also ==
- List of mountains and hills of Russia
