= Muosuchan Range =

Mountain range in north-eastern Russia

- Муосучанский Хребет / Муоһучаан сис
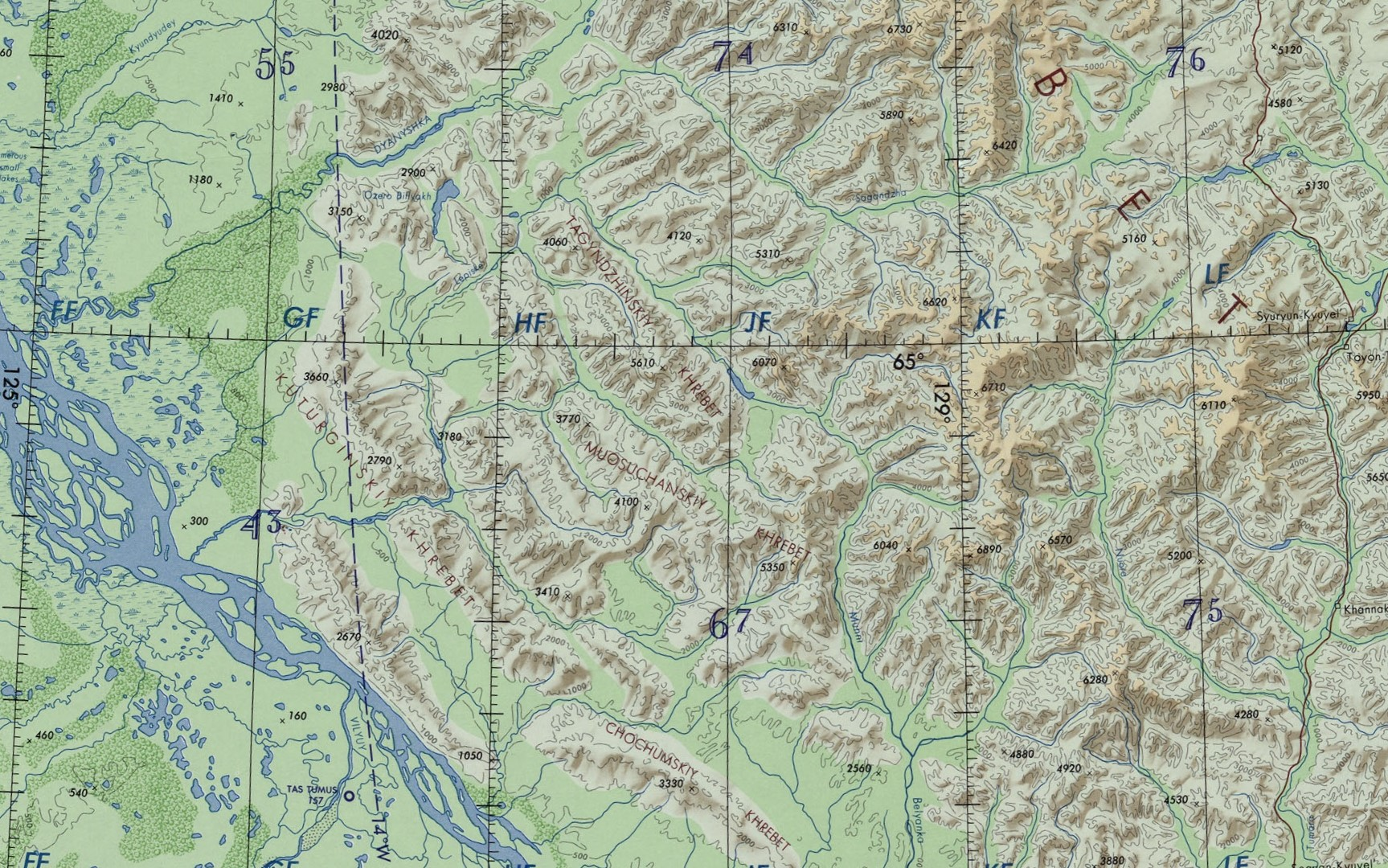
- ONC chart section showing the SW section of the Verkhoyansk Range

Highest point
- Peak: Unnamed
- Elevation: 1,243 m (4,078 ft)
- Coordinates: 64°45′N 127°30′E

Dimensions
- Length: 120 km (75 mi) NW / SE
- Width: 30 km (19 mi) NE/ SW

Geography
- Location within Sakha Republic
- Location: Sakha Republic, Far Eastern Federal District
- Parent range: Verkhoyansk Range, East Siberian System

Geology
- Orogeny: Alpine orogeny
- Rock type(s): Shale, sandstone, limestone

The Muosuchan Range (Russian: Муосучанский Хребет; Yakut: Муоһучаан сис, romanized: Muohuçaan sis) is a range of mountains in far North-eastern Russia. Administratively the range is part of the Sakha Republic, Russian Federation.

== Geography ==
The Muosuchan Range is one of the subranges of the Verkhoyansk Range system and is located in its southwestern section. It stretches roughly from northwest to southeast between the Bygyn Range to the west and the Tagindzhin Range to the east, running in a roughly parallel direction to both ranges. The southeastern end is bound by the valleys of the Munni (a tributary of the (Belyanka) and the Buruolakh (a tributary of the (Lyapiske), beyond which the Munni Range stretches eastwards.

River Lyapiske cuts across the range in its northwestern section and the Dyanyshka flows beyond the northern end. The highest point of the Muosuchan range is an unnamed 1,243-metre-high (4,078 ft) peak. Lake Billyakh is located at the northwestern end of the range. Beyond it rises the Tekir Khaya (highest point 926 metres or 3,038 feet), a smaller range flanking the Dyanyshka river further to the northwest.

== See also ==
- List of mountains and hills of Russia
