= Uel-Siktyakh =

River in Russia

Uel-Siktyakh Уэль-Сиктях / Юёл-Сииктээх
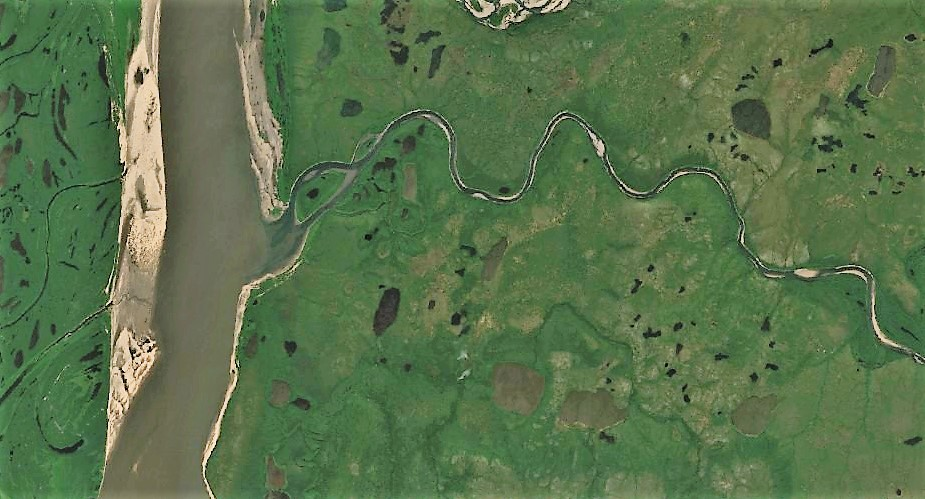
- Uel-Siktyakh mouth in the Lena Sentinel-2 image.

- Mouth location in Yakutia, Russia

Location
- Country: Russia

Physical characteristics
- Source
  - location: Dzhardzhan Range; Verkhoyansk Range
  - coordinates: 69°04′54″N 126°58′00″E
- Mouth: Lena
  - coordinates: 69°46′14″N 125°07′57″E
- Length: 247 km (153 mi)
- Basin size: 6,630 km^{2} (2,560 sq mi)

Basin features
- Progression: Lena→ Laptev Sea

The Uel-Siktyakh (Russian: Уэль-Сиктях; Yakut: Юёл-Сииктээх, Yuyol-Siikteex) is a river in the Sakha Republic (Yakutia), Russia. It is one of the northern tributaries of the Lena. The river has a length of 247 kilometres (153 mi) and a drainage basin area of 6,630 square kilometres (2,560 mi^{2}).

The river flows north of the Arctic Circle across desolate areas of Bulunsky District. The nearest inhabited place is Siktyakh, located near its mouth. The name of the river comes from the Yakut "uel/siktyakh" (уэл/сиктях), meaning "wet/damp place".

== Course ==
The Uel-Siktyakh is a right tributary of the Lena. It has its origin in the slopes of the Dzhardzhan Range, on the western flank of the Orulgan Range, northern Verkhoyansk Range system. The Uel-Siktyakh is formed at the confluence of the Yras-Siktyakh and Daldyndya rivers. It flows first roughly northwestwards. After leaving the mountains it bends and heads northeastwards across a floodplain. Towards the end it meanders strongly in a swampy area of the Central Yakutian Lowland dotted with lakes. Finally it bends westwards and joins the right bank of the Lena 383 km (238 mi) from its mouth, 22 km (14 mi) upstream of the mouth of the Kuranakh-Siktyakh.

The longest tributaries of the Uel-Siktyakh are the Atyrkan and the 43 km (27 mi) long Oymyakon, both from the right.

Lena basin with the Uel-Siktyakh in the upper right

== See also ==
- List of rivers of Russia
