= Lyapiske =

Lyapiske Yakut: Лээпискэ
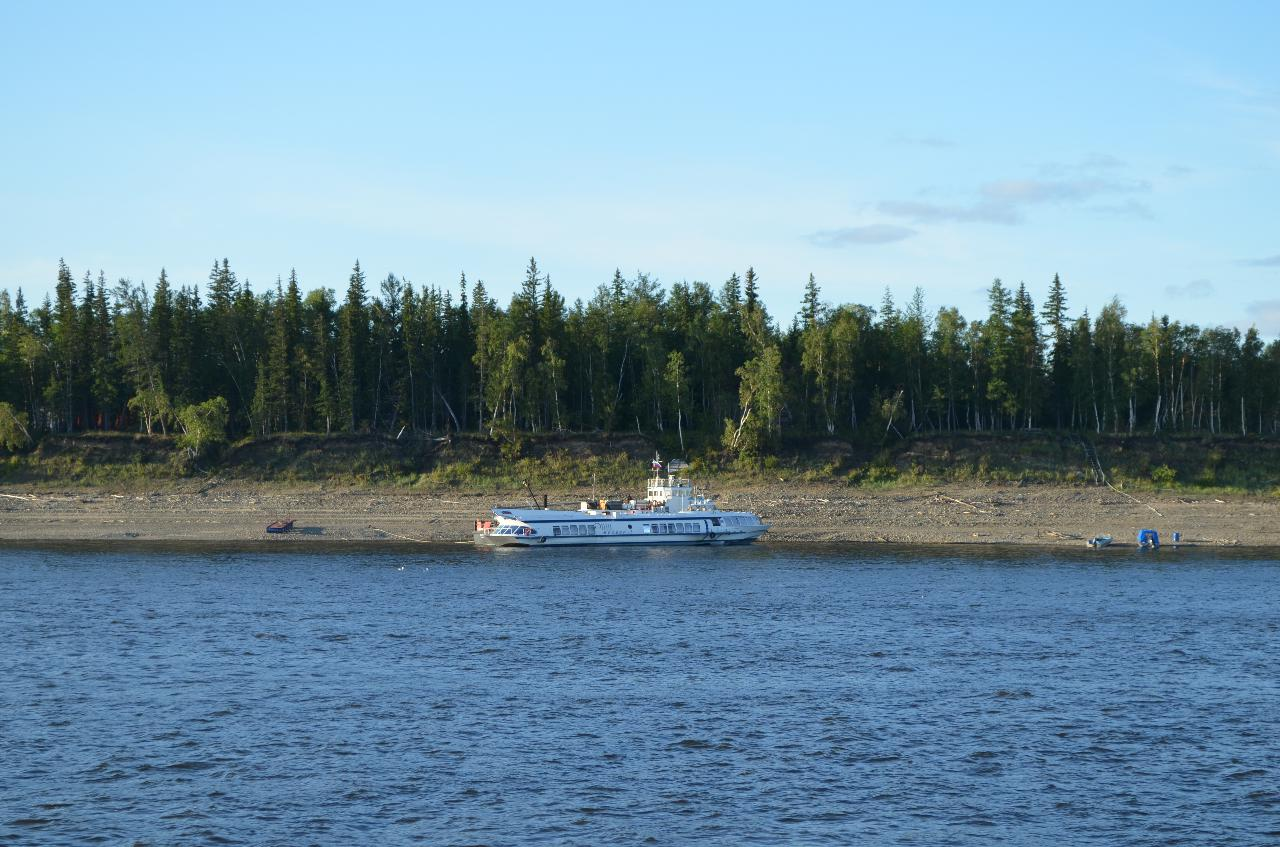
- Shores of the Lyapiske in its last stretch, near its confluence with the Lena

- Mouth location in Yakutia, Russia

Location
- Country: Russia

Physical characteristics
- Source
  - location: Kelter Range
  - coordinates: 64°52′54″N 129°03′11″E
  - elevation: 1,245 m (4,085 ft)
- Mouth: Lena
  - coordinates: 64°35′34″N 125°42′56″E
  - elevation: 66 m (217 ft)
- Length: 299 km (186 mi)
- Basin size: 10,300 km^{2} (4,000 sq mi)
- Discharge
  - average: 102 m^{3}/s (3,600 cu ft/s)

Basin features
- Progression: Lena→ Laptev Sea

The Lyapiske (Russian: Ляписке; Yakut: Лээпискэ, Leepiske), also known as Lepiske or Lyampushka (Russian: Лямпушка), is a river in the Kobyaysky District of the Sakha Republic (Yakutia), Russia. It is a tributary of the Lena, with a length of 299 kilometres (186 mi) and a drainage basin area of 10,300 square kilometres (4,000 mi^{2}). There are no settlements in the area of the river.

In the International scale of river difficulty the Lyapiske is a Class II destination for rafting and kayaking.

== Course ==
The Lyapiske is a right tributary of the Lena. It flows across mountainous terrain all along its course. Its source is located on the western slopes of the Kelter Range, one of the subranges of the southwestern sector of the Verkhoyansk Range, at an altitude of roughly 1,245 m (4,085 ft). No trees grow on the slopes of the mountain range, only in the valleys. The Lyapiske flows northwestwards, flanking the northeastern side of the Tagindzhin Range in its upper course. Then, before the end of the range it bends southwestwards into a gorge, cutting across the Tagindzhin, the Muosuchan and the Bygyn ranges, after which it bends and flows southwards. A little upstream from its confluence with the Buruolakh, its main tributary, the Lyapiske bends sharply again and flows roughly westwards, cutting across the Kuturgin Range.

In its last stretch the Lyapiske flows at the northwestern limit of the Ust-Vilyuy Range where it makes two short sharp bends among high rocky shores. Finally it flows across a stretch of flat terrain at the edge of the Central Yakutian Lowland and joins the right bank of the Lena 1,057 km (657 mi) from its mouth. Its confluence with the Lena is close to the mouth of the Tympylykan on the opposite bank.

=== Tributaries ===
The longest tributary of the Lyapiske is the 106 km (66 mi) long Buruolakh that joins it from the left. Other significant tributaries are Igelte, Tolbon, Muosuchan and Sygynkan.

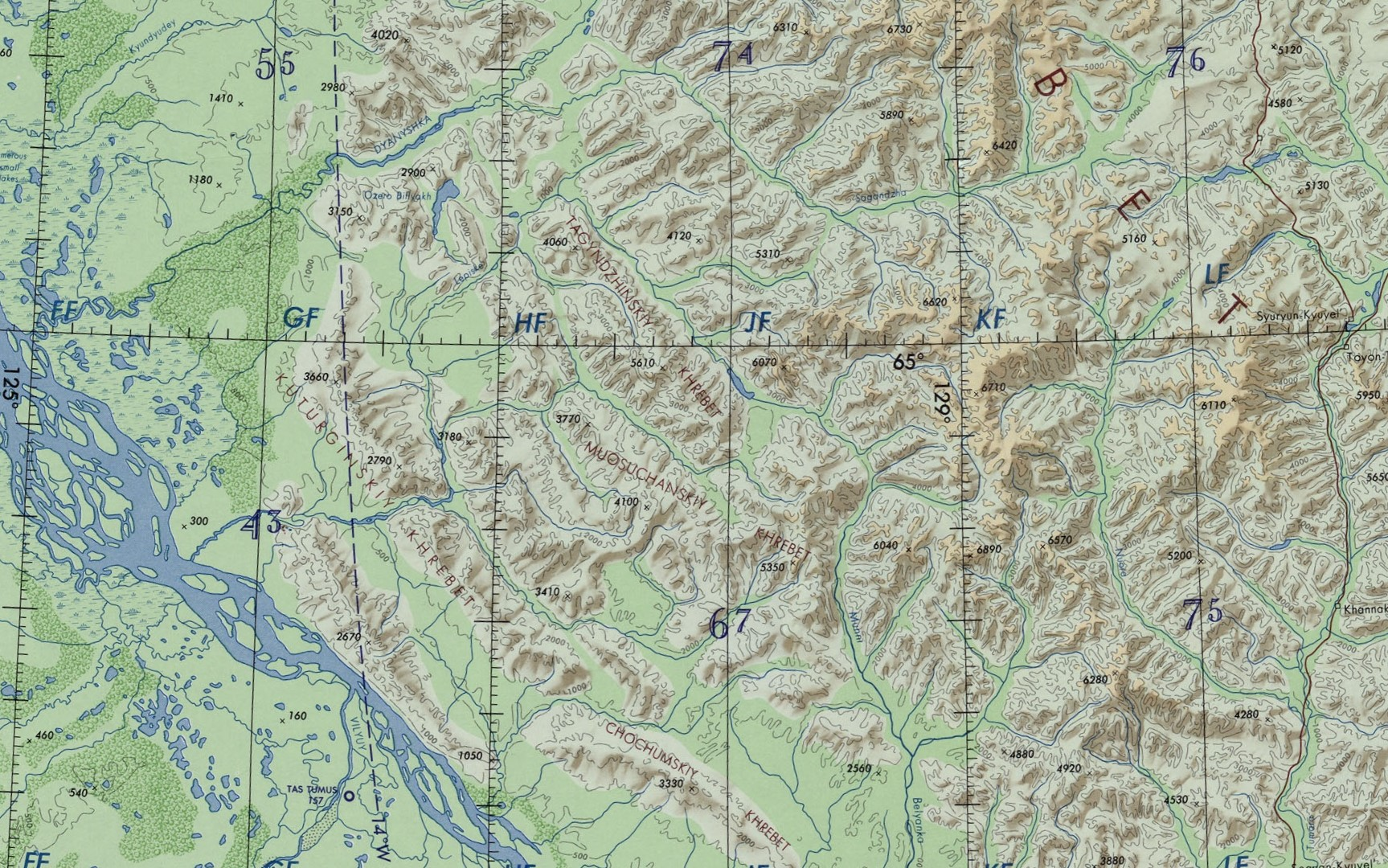
ONC chart section showing the SW section of the Verkhoyansk Range

== Fauna ==
Taimen is an abundant species in the river, a fact being mentioned in the Red Data Book of the Russian Federation. Lenok, pike, grayling, ide, perch and whitefish are also found in the waters of the Lyapiske.

== See also ==
- List of rivers of Russia
