= Aldan (river) =

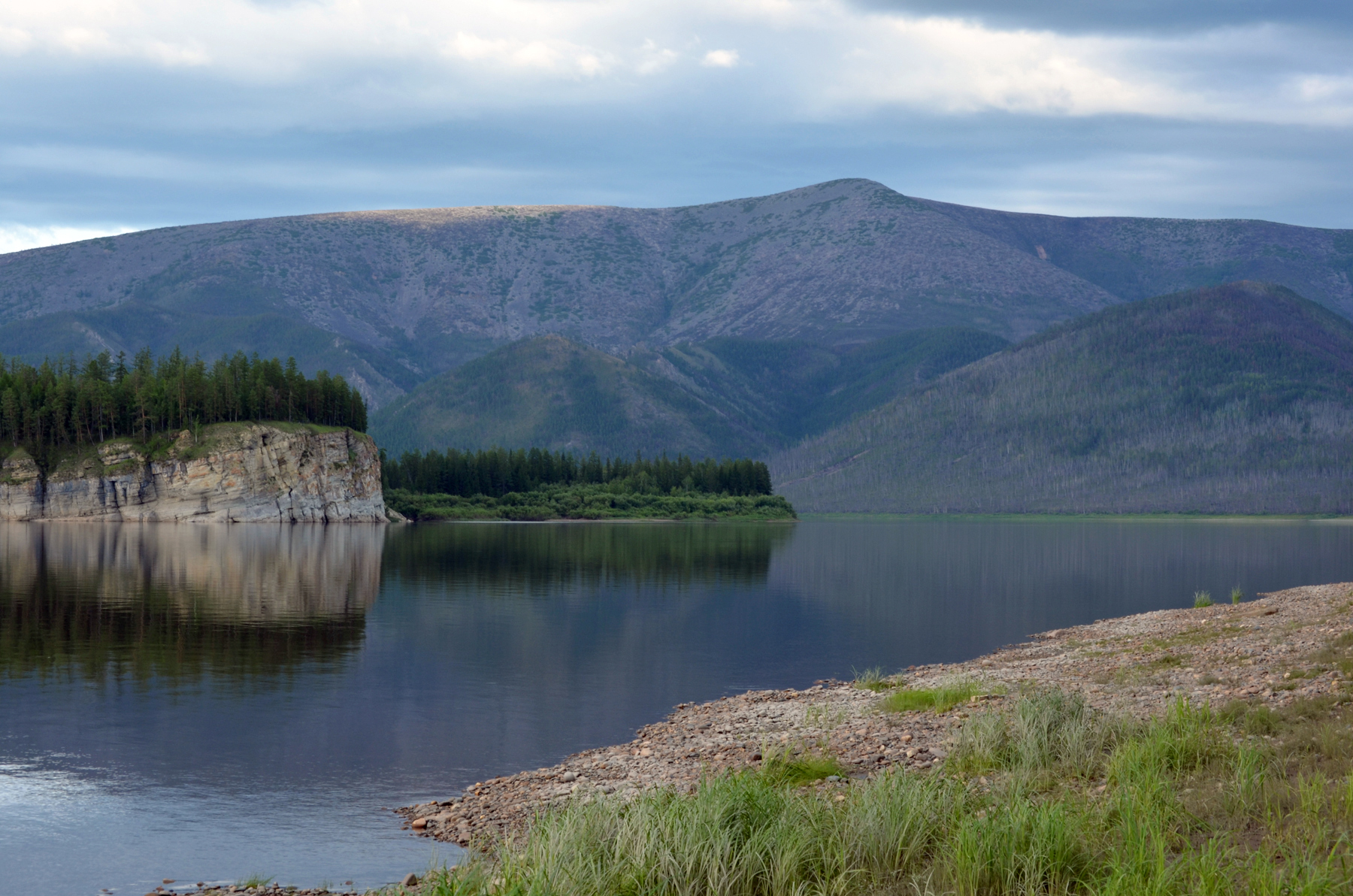
- The Aldan by the Kyllakh Range

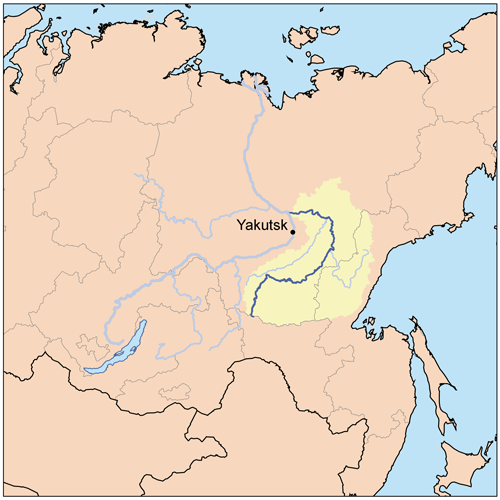
- Map of the Aldan River course

Location
- Country: Russia

Physical characteristics
- Source: Stanovoy Mountains
  - location: Neryungri, Sakha
  - coordinates: 56°29′06″N 123°44′02″E
  - elevation: 1,224 m (4,016 ft)
- Mouth: Lena
  - location: Sakha
  - coordinates: 63°26′46″N 129°33′13″E
  - elevation: 43 m (141 ft)
- Length: 2,273 km (1,412 mi)
- Basin size: 729,000 km^{2} (281,000 sq mi)
- Discharge
  - average: 5,489 m^{3}/s (193,800 cu ft/s) (near mouth)

Basin features
- Progression: Lena→ Laptev Sea
- Tributaries
  - left: Amedichi, Amga
  - right: Timpton, Uchur, Maya, Allakh-Yun

The Aldan (Sakha and Russian: Алдан) is the second-longest right tributary of the Lena in the Sakha Republic in eastern Siberia. The river is 2,273 kilometres (1,412 mi) long, of which around 1,600 kilometres (990 mi) is navigable. It has a drainage basin of 729,000 square kilometres (281,000 sq mi).

The river was part of the River Route to Okhotsk. In 1639 Ivan Moskvitin ascended the rivers Aldan and Maya and crossed to the Ulya to reach the Sea of Okhotsk.

Its basin is known for gold and for Cambrian fossils.

== Etymology ==
Previously, a version of the origin from the Turkic-Mongolian word altan, altyn in the meaning of "gold" was spread, then a hypothesis appeared of the origin of the hydronym Aldan (in the variant Allan) from the Evenk oldo, ollo — "fish". Another explanation: aldan is a coastal spring ice (evenk).

== Course ==
The Aldan rises in the Stanovoy Mountains southwest of Neryungri. It flows roughly in a northeast / ENE direction south of the Lena Plateau across the Aldan Highlands, where it forms the northern border of the Sunnagyn Range. Then it flows past Aldan and through Tommot, Ust-Maya, Eldikan and Khandyga before turning northwest. In its last stretch it flanks the southern slopes of the Verkhoyansk Range and joins the Lena near Batamay.

=== Tributaries ===
The river's main tributaries are the following:

From the right

- Timpton
- Uchur
- Maya
- Khamna
- Allakh-Yun
- Khanda
- Tyry
- Eastern Khandyga
- Tompo
- Khandiga
- Baray
- Tukulan
- Kele
- Tumara
  - Nuora

From the left

- Amedichi
- Chuga
- Yungyuele
- Bilir
- Notora
- Kuoluma
- Amga
- Tatta
- Tanda.

Basin of the Lena with the Aldan River in the right side

== See also ==
- List of rivers of Russia
