= Begidyan =

River in Yakutia, Russia

Begidyan Бегидян / Бэгидьээн
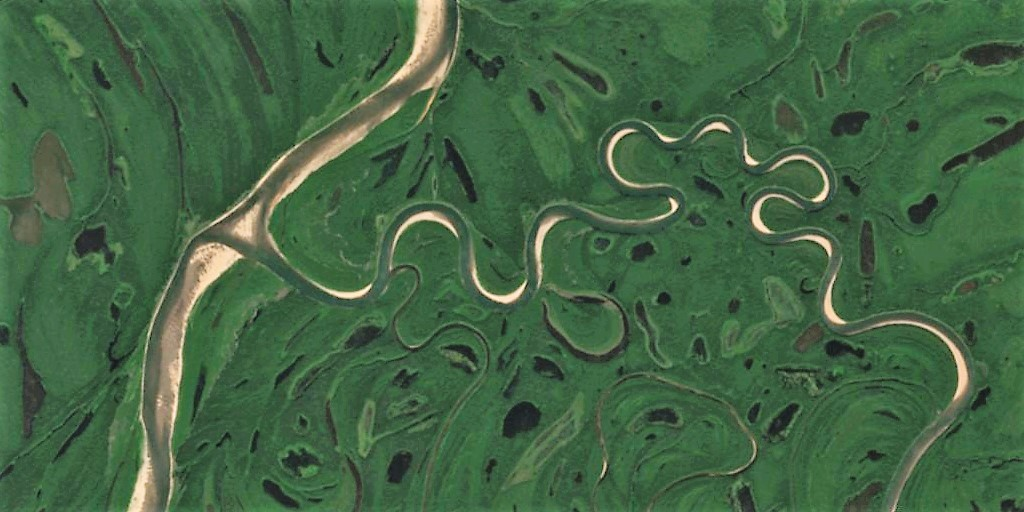
- Begidyan mouth in the Lena Sentinel-2 image.

- Mouth location in Yakutia, Russia

Location
- Country: Russia

Physical characteristics
- Source
  - location: Confluence of rivers Tarynnakh and Buor-Salyr-Taryna; Verkhoyansk Range
  - coordinates: 66°48′16″N 126°05′30″E
- Mouth: Lena
  - coordinates: 66°47′49″N 123°42′13″E
- Length: 195 km (121 mi) (262 km (163 mi))
- Basin size: 3,910 km^{2} (1,510 sq mi)

Basin features
- Progression: Lena→ Laptev Sea

The Begidyan (Russian: Бегидян, also Бегиджян; Yakut: Бэгидьээн) is a river in Sakha Republic (Yakutia), Russia. It is a right tributary of the Lena. The river has a length of 195 kilometres (121 mi) —262 km (163 mi) together with the Tarynnakh— and a drainage basin area of 3,910 square kilometres (1,510 mi^{2}).

The Begidyan flows across uninhabited territories of Zhigansky District. Its mouth is near Zhigansk, the district capital, located on the opposite bank of the Lena.

== Course ==
The Begidyan is formed at the confluence of two rivers, the 67 kilometres (42 mi) long Tarynnakh (Тарыннаах) and the 63 kilometres (39 mi) long Buor-Salyr-Taryna (Буорсалыыр-Тарына) at the northern end of the Kuyellyakh Range. Both rivers are formed on the slopes of the Byrandia Range, western side of the Verkhoyansk Range. The Begidyan flows first northwestwards. After leaving the mountains it heads southwestwards into the Central Yakutian Lowland, forming meanders in the flat permafrost floodplain. After a stretch it bends and flows roughly northwestwards. Finally it joins the right bank of an arm of the Lena 740 km (460 mi) from its mouth.

The longest tributary of the Begidyan is the 51 km (32 mi) long Yulegiir from the left. The last half of the river course lies in an area dotted with small lakes. The river freezes in the first half of October and opens in late May to early June.

== Fauna ==
The main fish species found in the waters of the river are grayling, lenok, nelma, whitefish, pike, ide and perch.

== See also ==
- List of rivers of Russia
