= Segyan-Kyuyol =

Segyan-Kyuyol Сегян-Кюёль
- Selo
- Interactive map of Segyan-Kyuyol
- Location of Segyan-Kyuyol Segyan-Kyuyol (Sakha Republic)
- Coordinates: 64°01′N 130°18′E
- Country: Russia
- Federal subject: Sakha Republic
- Administrative district: Kobyaysky District
- Rural okrugSelsoviet: Kirovsky Rural Okrug

Population (2010 Census)
  - Total: 395
  - Estimate (2021): 242 (−38.7%)

Administrative status
  - Capital of: Kirovsky Rural Okrug

Municipal status
  - Municipal district: Kobyaysky Municipal District
  - Rural settlement: Kirovsky Rural Settlement
  - Capital of: Kirovsky Rural Settlement
- Time zone: UTC+
- Postal code: 678312
- OKTMO ID: 98624414101

Segyan-Kyuyol (Russian: Сегян-Кюёль; Yakut: Сиэгэн Күөл, Siegen Küöl) is a rural locality (a selo) and the administrative center of Kirovsky Rural Okrug in Kobyaysky District of the Sakha Republic, Russia. Its population as of the 2010 Census was 395; down from 430 recorded in the 2002 Census.

== Geography ==
The village is located at the southern edge of the Verkhoyansk Range, south of the Munni Range, on the right bank of the Tumara River. Sangar, the administrative center of the district, lies at a distance of 138 km (86 mi) to the east.

== Climate ==
Segyan-Kyuyol has an extreme monsoon subarctic climate (Köppen climate classification Dwd). Winters are extremely cold and dry while summers are quite warm and wet. Frosts are possible in all months of year. Precipitation is moderate and definitely higher in summer than at other times of the year.

Climate data for Segyan-Kyuyol (1991–2020 normals, extremes 1938–present)
Month	Jan	Feb	Mar	Apr	May	Jun	Jul	Aug	Sep	Oct	Nov	Dec	Year
Record high °C (°F)	−2.1 (28.2)	−2.3 (27.9)	6.1 (43.0)	13.4 (56.1)	29.8 (85.6)	34.2 (93.6)	36.1 (97.0)	35.6 (96.1)	25.2 (77.4)	11.4 (52.5)	3.4 (38.1)	−3.8 (25.2)	36.1 (97.0)
Mean daily maximum °C (°F)	−35.5 (−31.9)	−28.0 (−18.4)	−12.7 (9.1)	0.5 (32.9)	11.3 (52.3)	21.5 (70.7)	24.4 (75.9)	20.3 (68.5)	10.2 (50.4)	−5.5 (22.1)	−24.8 (−12.6)	−36.6 (−33.9)	−4.6 (23.8)
Daily mean °C (°F)	−39.9 (−39.8)	−35.7 (−32.3)	−21.1 (−6.0)	−5.5 (22.1)	6.3 (43.3)	15.5 (59.9)	18.1 (64.6)	13.9 (57.0)	5.0 (41.0)	−10.4 (13.3)	−29.7 (−21.5)	−40.2 (−40.4)	−10.3 (13.4)
Mean daily minimum °C (°F)	−44.3 (−47.7)	−42.4 (−44.3)	−30.0 (−22.0)	−12.7 (9.1)	0.4 (32.7)	8.0 (46.4)	10.7 (51.3)	7.3 (45.1)	0.0 (32.0)	−15.9 (3.4)	−34.9 (−30.8)	−44.0 (−47.2)	−16.5 (2.3)
Record low °C (°F)	−60.5 (−76.9)	−58.6 (−73.5)	−53.5 (−64.3)	−42.8 (−45.0)	−28.3 (−18.9)	−4.7 (23.5)	−2.4 (27.7)	−9.8 (14.4)	−18.5 (−1.3)	−45.0 (−49.0)	−57.3 (−71.1)	−59.5 (−75.1)	−60.5 (−76.9)
Average precipitation mm (inches)	9 (0.4)	8 (0.3)	12 (0.5)	17 (0.7)	41 (1.6)	58 (2.3)	75 (3.0)	67 (2.6)	67 (2.6)	42 (1.7)	18 (0.7)	7 (0.3)	421 (16.7)
Source: Погода и Климат
