= Batamay, Kobyaysky District, Sakha Republic =

Batamay Батамай
- Selo
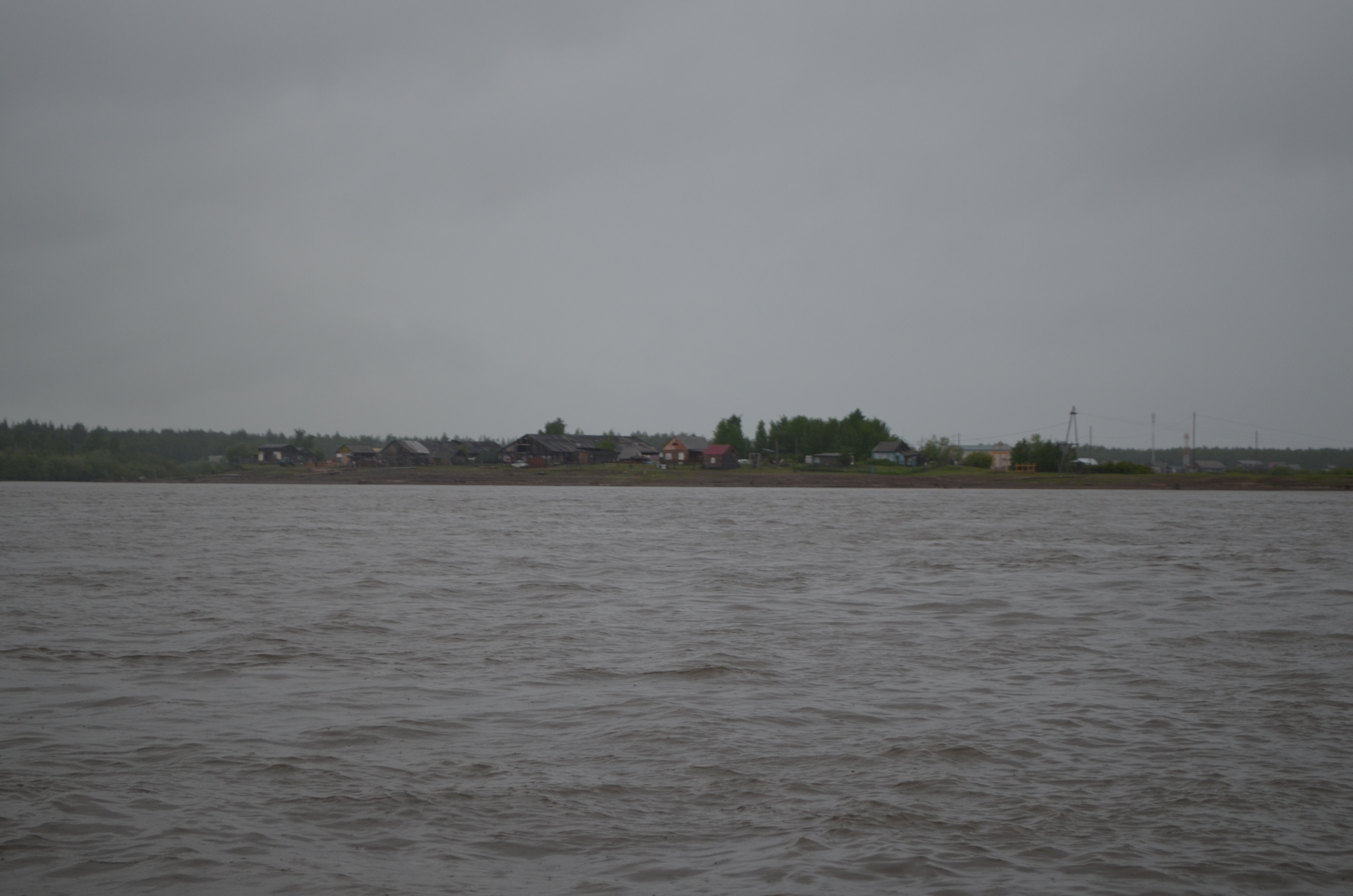
- View of the village from the banks of the Kharyynka River
- Interactive map of Batamay
- Location of Batamay Batamay (Sakha Republic)
- Coordinates: 63°31′22″N 129°25′28″E
- Country: Russia
- Federal subject: Sakha Republic
- Administrative district: Kobyaysky District
- Rural okrugSelsoviet: Kirovsky Rural Okrug

Population
  - Estimate (2002): 216 )

Municipal status
  - Municipal district: Kobyaysky Municipal District
  - Rural settlement: Kirovsky Rural Settlement
- Time zone: UTC+
- Postal code: 678312
- OKTMO ID: 98624414106

Batamay (Russian: Батамай) is a rural locality (a selo), and one of two settlements in Kirovsky Rural Okrug of Kobyaysky District in the Sakha Republic, Russia, in addition to Segyan-Kyuyol, the administrative center of the Rural Okrug. It is located 160 kilometers (99 mi) from Sangar, the administrative center of the district and 90 kilometers (56 mi) from Segyan-Kyuyol. Its population as of the 2002 Census was 216.

== Geography ==
Batamay is located near the confluence of the Aldan and the Lena River, in the eastern part of the Central Yakutian Plain and south of the Verkhoyansk Range. It lies on the right bank of the Kharyynka River, at its confluence with the Lena.

== Climate ==
Batamai has an extreme subarctic climate. (Köppen Dfd, bordering on Dwd) with extremely cold, long winters and short, warm summers.

Climate data for Batamay, Kobyaysky District
| Month | Jan | Feb | Mar | Apr | May | Jun | Jul | Aug | Sep | Oct | Nov | Dec | Year |
|---|---|---|---|---|---|---|---|---|---|---|---|---|---|
| Record high °C (°F) | −8.9 (16.0) | −6.6 (20.1) | 8.0 (46.4) | 20.0 (68.0) | 28.0 (82.4) | 32.6 (90.7) | 38.0 (100.4) | 37.0 (98.6) | 24.8 (76.6) | 13.9 (57.0) | −1.3 (29.7) | −11.9 (10.6) | 38.0 (100.4) |
| Mean daily maximum °C (°F) | −37.4 (−35.3) | −31.4 (−24.5) | −15.9 (3.4) | −1.7 (28.9) | 10.0 (50.0) | 19.5 (67.1) | 23.0 (73.4) | 19.5 (67.1) | 9.9 (49.8) | −6.4 (20.5) | −26.3 (−15.3) | −36.3 (−33.3) | −6.0 (21.2) |
| Daily mean °C (°F) | −40.9 (−41.6) | −36.5 (−33.7) | −23.0 (−9.4) | −8.0 (17.6) | 5.0 (41.0) | 14.1 (57.4) | 17.3 (63.1) | 13.7 (56.7) | 4.9 (40.8) | −10.3 (13.5) | −30.2 (−22.4) | −39.6 (−39.3) | −11.0 (12.2) |
| Mean daily minimum °C (°F) | −45.7 (−50.3) | −43.1 (−45.6) | −32.2 (−26.0) | −16.7 (1.9) | −1.5 (29.3) | 6.8 (44.2) | 9.8 (49.6) | 6.3 (43.3) | −1.1 (30.0) | −15.6 (3.9) | −35.5 (−31.9) | −44.1 (−47.4) | −17.6 (0.3) |
| Record low °C (°F) | −65.7 (−86.3) | −58.9 (−74.0) | −53.2 (−63.8) | −42.3 (−44.1) | −22.2 (−8.0) | −6.4 (20.5) | −4.0 (24.8) | −7.2 (19.0) | −19.1 (−2.4) | −45.0 (−49.0) | −52.7 (−62.9) | −60.0 (−76.0) | −65.7 (−86.3) |
| Average precipitation mm (inches) | 8.4 (0.33) | 9.4 (0.37) | 9.9 (0.39) | 12.3 (0.48) | 24.8 (0.98) | 74.3 (2.93) | 46.6 (1.83) | 71.4 (2.81) | 44.9 (1.77) | 44.3 (1.74) | 22.7 (0.89) | 11.4 (0.45) | 380.4 (14.98) |
| Average precipitation days | 14.4 | 10.7 | 8.4 | 6.3 | 9.1 | 7.9 | 8.3 | 8.9 | 10.8 | 19.6 | 18.5 | 12.6 | 135.5 |
