= Verkhoyansk Range =

Mountain range in eastern Siberia, Russia

- Верхоянский хребет Үөһээ Дьааҥы сис хайата
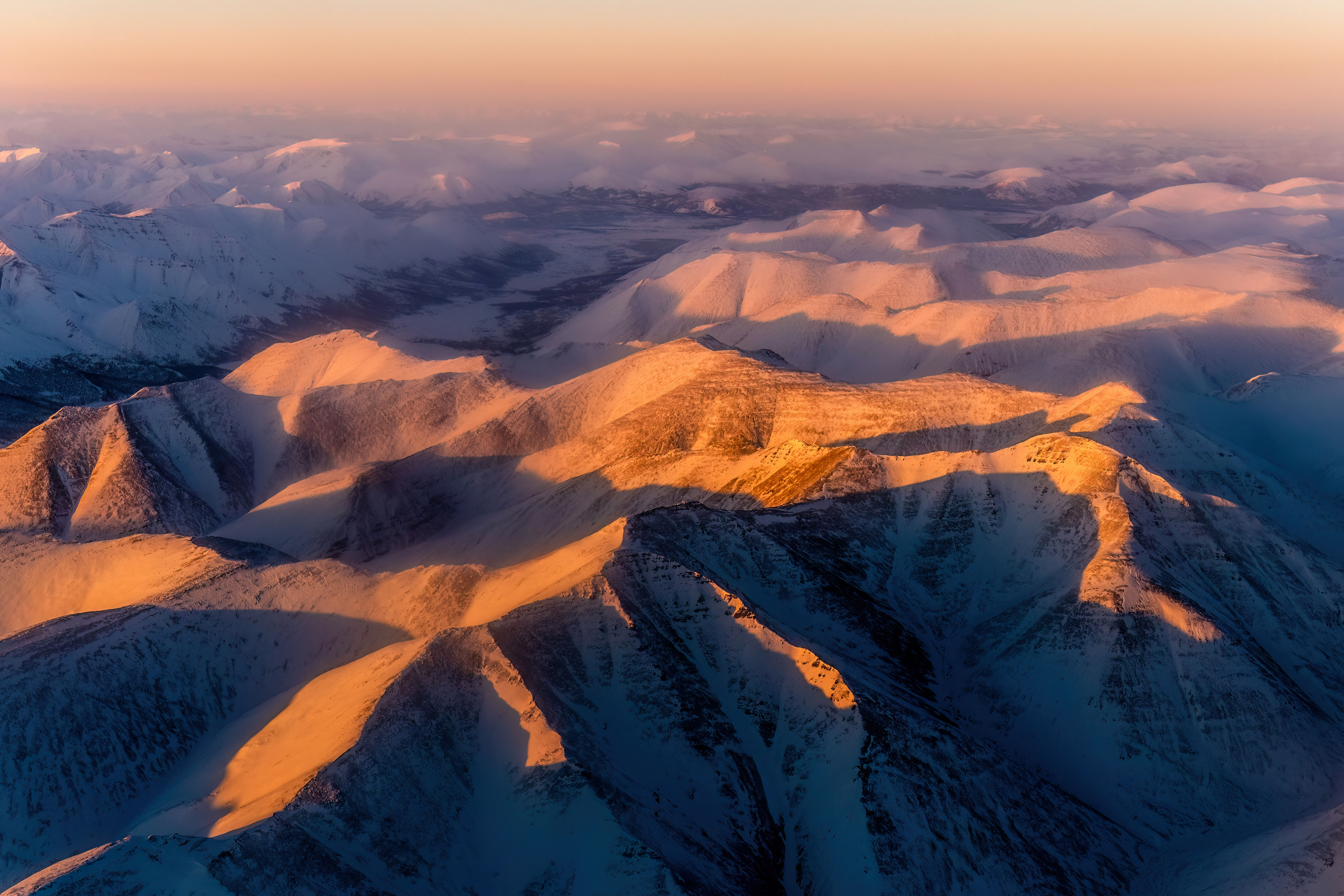
- Aerial view of the Verkhoyansk Mountains

Highest point
- Peak: Orulgan high point
- Elevation: 2,409 m (7,904 ft)
- Coordinates: 67°N 129°E

Dimensions
- Length: 1,100 km (680 mi)

Geography
- Location within Far Eastern Federal District
- Country: Russia
- State: Sakha Republic
- Parent range: East Siberian System

Geology
- Orogeny: Alpine orogeny
- Rock age: Cretaceous
- Rock type: Metamorphic rocks

The Verkhoyansk Range (Russian: Верхоянский хребет, Verhoyanskiy Khrebet; Yakut: Үөһээ Дьааҥы сис хайата, romanized: Üöhee Caañı sis xayata) is a mountain range in the Sakha Republic, Russia, near the settlement of Verkhoyansk, known for its frigid climate. It is part of the East Siberian Mountains.

The range lies just west of the boundary of the Eurasian and the North American tectonic plates. The mountains were formed by folding, and represent an anticline.

The Verkhoyansk Range was covered by glaciers during the Last Glacial Period, and the mountains in the northern section, such as the Orulgan Range, display a typical Alpine relief.

There are coal, silver, lead, tin, and zinc deposits in the mountains.

== Geography ==
Rising from the shores of the Buor-Khaya Gulf in the north, it runs southwards spanning roughly 1,000 kilometres (600 mi) across Yakutia, east of the Central Yakutian Lowland, and west of the Chersky Range, reaching the Lena Plateau to the south and the Yudoma-Maya Highlands to the southeast. It forms a vast arc between the Lena and Aldan rivers to the west and the Yana River to the east.

The Verkhoyansk Range has a higher southeastern prolongation than the Suntar-Khayata Range, which is occasionally considered as a separate range system. Thus the highest point of the range in a restricted geographical sense is an unnamed 2,409-metre-high (7,904 ft) peak in the Orulgan Range. The Ulakhan-Bom, highest point 1,600 metres (5,200 ft), Sette-Daban, highest point 2,012 metres (6,601 ft), and Skalisty Range (Rocky Range), highest point 2,017 metres (6,617 ft), are located at the southern end and were also considered separate ranges in classical geographic works. The two ranges were surveyed in 1934 by geologist Yuri Bilibin (1901–1952) together with mining engineer Evgeny Bobin (1897–1941) in the course of an expedition sent by the government of the Soviet Union. After conducting the first topographic survey of the area, Bilibin established that the Skalisty and Sette-Daban mountain chains belong to the Verkhoyansk Mountain System. Bilibin and Bobin also explored for the first time the Yudoma-Maya Highlands, located to the southeast of the Ulakhan-Bom/Sette-Daban/Skalisty ranges.

=== Subranges ===
Besides the Orulgan, the system of the range comprises a number of subranges, as well as a plateau, including the following:

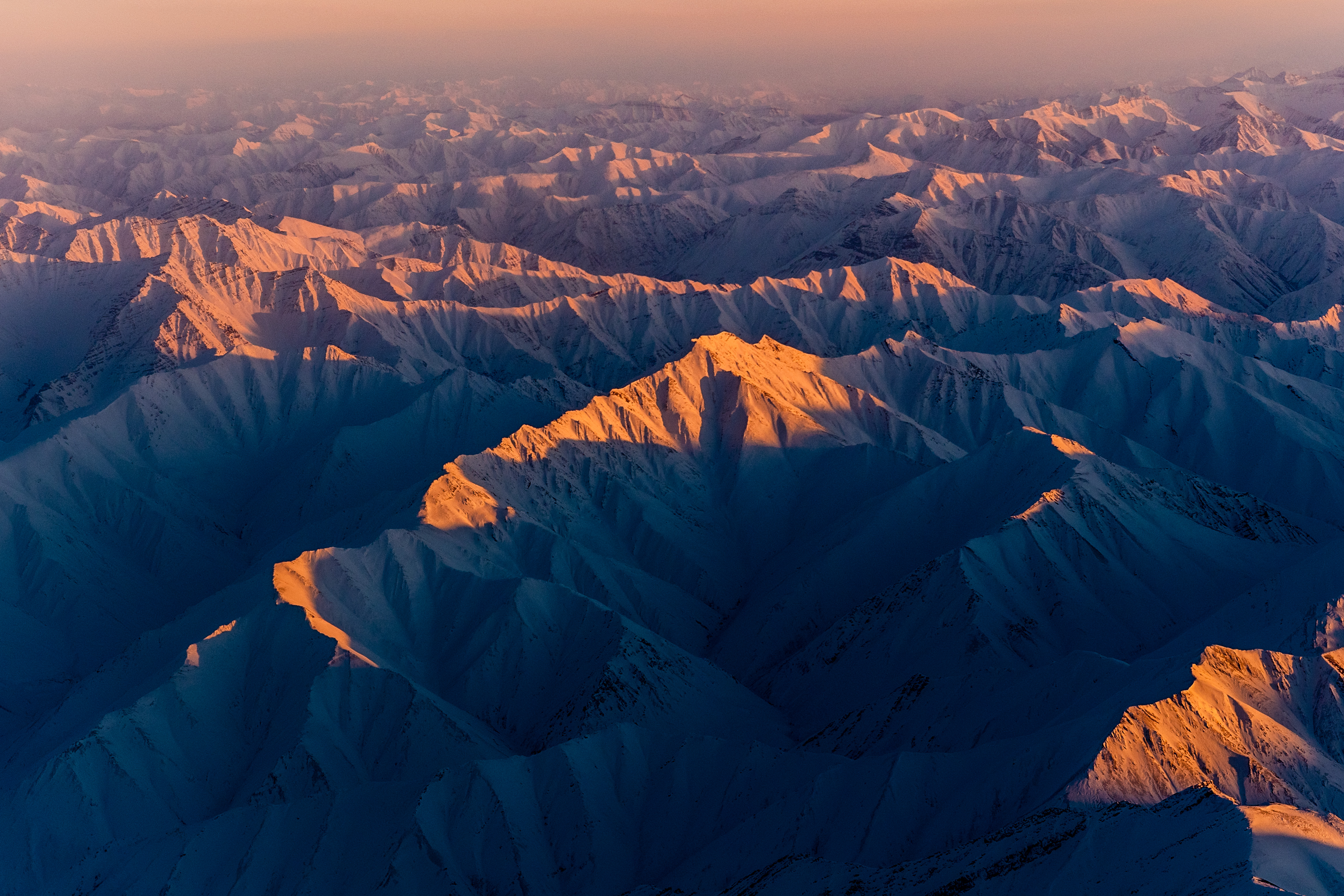
Verkhoyansk Range

Northern section —north of the Arctic Circle

- Kharaulakh Range, highest point 1,429 metres (4,688 ft)
  - Tuora Sis, highest point 990 metres (3,250 ft)
  - Kunga Range, highest point 439 metres (1,440 ft)
- Dzhardzhan Range, highest point 1,925 metres (6,316 ft)
- Sietinden Range, highest point 1,929 metres (6,329 ft)
- Kular Range, highest point 1,289 metres (4,229 ft)
- Byrandia Range, highest point 1,915 metres (6,283 ft)
- Kuyellyakh Range (Кюельляхский хребет), highest point 1,483 metres (4,865 ft)

Southern section —south of the Arctic Circle

- Echysky Massif, highest point 2,063 metres (6,768 ft)
- Arkachan Plateau, highest point 1,351 metres (4,432 ft)
- Tagindzhin Range, highest point 2,084 metres (6,837 ft)
- Muosuchan Range, highest point 1,243 metres (4,078 ft)
- Bygyn Range, highest point 1,152 metres (3,780 ft)
- Kuturgin Range, highest point 1,056 metres (3,465 ft)
- Munni Range, highest point 1,784 metres (5,853 ft)
- Kelter Range, highest point 2,002 metres (6,568 ft)
- Sorkin Range, highest point 1,250 metres (4,100 ft)
- Ust-Vilyuy Range, highest point 998 metres (3,274 ft) (close to the Lena)
- Chochum Range, highest point 1,363 metres (4,472 ft)
- Sordogin Range, highest point 1,352 metres (4,436 ft)
- Khabakh Range, highest point 1,122 metres (3,681 ft) (east)
- Khunkhadin Range, highest point 1,802 metres (5,912 ft) (east)

Far southern section (Part of the greater Verkhoyansk Range, together with the Suntar Khayata)

- Kyllakh Range, highest point 901 metres (2,956 ft)
- Ulakhan-Bom, highest point 1,830 metres (6,000 ft),
- Sette-Daban, highest point 2,102 metres (6,896 ft)
- Skalisty Range, highest point 2,017 metres (6,617 ft)

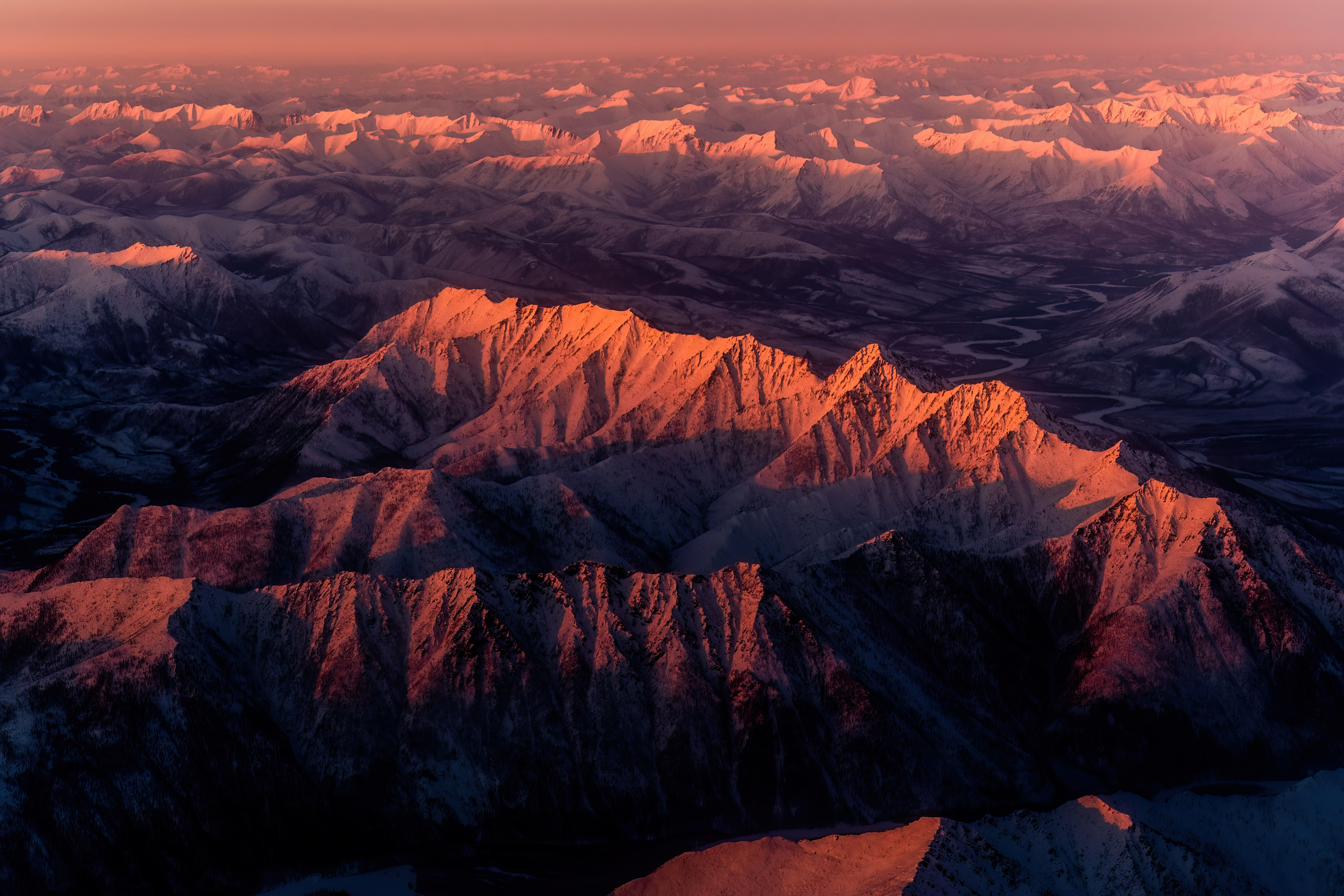
Rugged ridges in the Verkhoyansk Range.

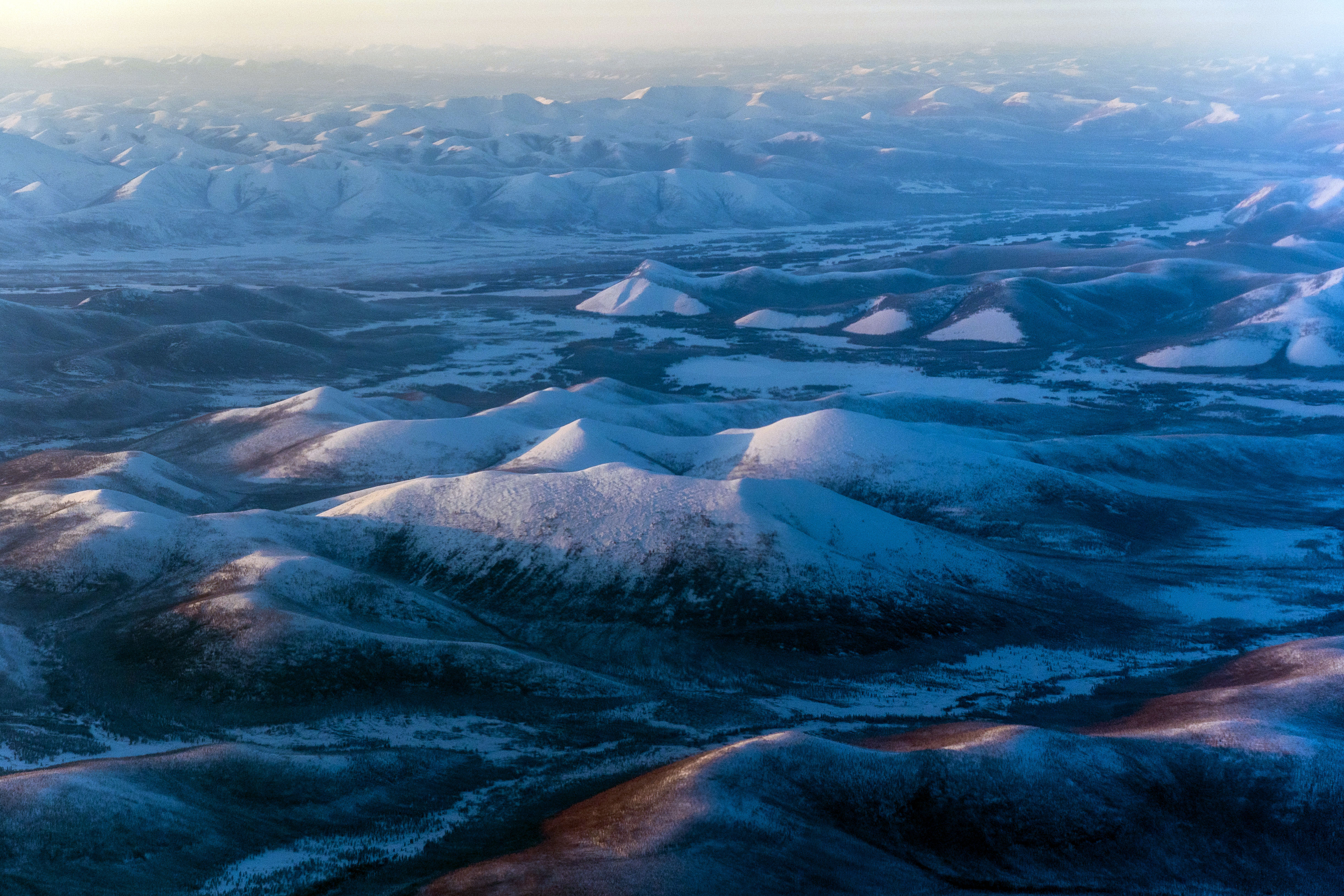
Landscape of the Verkhoyansk Range with smooth mountains and intermontane basins.

=== Hydrography ===
The Verkhoyansk mountain system separates the basins of the Lena River to the west and southwest and the Omoloy and Yana to the east and northeast. It is deeply cut by riverine intermontane basins. Many right tributaries of the Lena flow westwards, having their sources in the range, including the Kyundyudey, Undyulyung, Begidyan, Sobolokh-Mayan, Menkere, Dzhardzhan, Uel-Siktyakh, Kuranakh-Siktyakh, Byosyuke, Tikyan, Dyanyshka, Lyapiske, Belyanka, Munni, Kele, Tukulan, Tumara, Nuora, and Baray, among others. To the northeast flow left tributaries of the Omoloy such as the Kuranakh-Yuryakh, Arga-Yuryakh, Bukhuruk, and Sietinde. The Tompo cuts across the range in its southern part, flowing from its source in the Suntar Khayata. The valley of the Aldan is located to the south, where the river makes a wide bend.

From the eastern slopes flow the rivers Dulgalakh and Sartang, which form the river Yana further north, as well as its tributaries Bytantay, Nelgese, Derbeke, and Baky, among others.

Rivers in the mountainous areas are usually frozen between September and May.

== Climate and flora ==
The world's lowest temperatures for inhabited places have been recorded in this region at Verkhoyansk (−67.8 °C; −90.0 °F) and Oymyakon (−67.7 °C; −89.9 °F), and there is quite deep snow cover for most of the year.

The mountain range is home to an alpine tundra, supporting various species of mosses and lichens. Some sparsely-wooded forests of mainly larch and dwarf Siberian pine are found on smooth slopes.

== See also ==
- List of mountains and hills of Russia
- Chersky Range
