= Sitte, Kobyaysky District, Sakha Republic =

Sitte Ситте
- Selo
- Interactive map of Sitte
- Location of Sitte Sitte (Sakha Republic)
- Coordinates: 63°29′31″N 128°02′28″E
- Country: Russia
- Federal subject: Sakha Republic
- Administrative district: Kobyaysky District
- Rural okrugSelsoviet: Sittinsky Rural Okrug

Population (2010 Census)
  - Total: 503
  - Estimate (2021): 469 (−6.8%)

Administrative status
  - Capital of: Sittinsky Rural Okrug

Municipal status
  - Municipal district: Kobyaysky Municipal District
  - Rural settlement: Sittinsky Rural Settlement
  - Capital of: Sittinsky Rural Settlement
- Time zone: UTC+
- Postal code: 678305
- OKTMO ID: 98624450101

Sitte (Russian: Ситте; Yakut: Сииттэ, Siitte) is a rural locality (a selo), the only inhabited locality, and the administrative center of Sittinsky Rural Okrug of Kobyaysky District in the Sakha Republic, Russia. Its population as of the 2010 Census was 503, of whom 243 were male and 260 female, up from 466 recorded during the 2002 Census.

== Geography ==
Sitte is a village of the central part of Yakutia, in the Central Yakutian Lowland, west of the Lena River and east of the Sitte River. It is located 80 kilometers (50 mi) —about 54 kilometers (34 mi) in a straight line— southeast from Sangar, the administrative center of the district.
