= Byranattalakh =

Byranattalakh Быранатталах
- Selo
- Location of Byranattalakh
- Location of Byranattalakh Byranattalakh (Sakha Republic)
- Coordinates: 63°40′50″N 124°22′02″E
- Country: Russia
- Federal subject: Sakha Republic
- Administrative district: Kobyaysky District
- Rural okrug: Second Luchcheginsky Rural Okrug

Population
  - Estimate (2002): 0

Municipal status
  - Municipal district: Kobyaysky Municipal District
  - Rural settlement: Second Luchcheginsky Rural Settlement
- Time zone: UTC+9 (MSK+6)
- Postal code(s): 678313
- OKTMO ID: 98624435106

Byranattalakh (Russian: Быранатталах) is a rural locality (a selo), and one of three settlements in Ariktakhsky Rural Okrug of Kobyaysky District in the Sakha Republic, Russia, in addition to Mastakh, the administrative center of the Rural Okrug and Second Mastakh. It is located 275 kilometers (171 mi) from Sangar, the administrative center of the district and 10 kilometers (6.2 mi) from Ariktakh. Its population as of the 2002 Census was 0.
