= Lyuksyugyun =

Lyuksyugyun Люксюгюн
- Selo
- Interactive map of Lyuksyugyun
- Location of Lyuksyugyun Lyuksyugyun (Sakha Republic)
- Coordinates: 63°43′10″N 124°58′34″E
- Country: Russia
- Federal subject: Sakha Republic
- Administrative district: Kobyaysky District
- Rural okrugSelsoviet: Aryktakhsky Rural Okrug

Population
  - Estimate (2002): 216 )

Municipal status
  - Municipal district: Kobyaysky Municipal District
  - Rural settlement: Aryktakhsky Rural Settlement
- Time zone: UTC+
- Postal code: 678316
- OKTMO ID: 98624405106

Lyuksyugyun (Russian: Люксюгюн) is a rural locality (a selo), and one of three settlements in Aryktakhsky Rural Okrug of Kobyaysky District in the Sakha Republic, Russia, in addition to Aryktakh, the administrative center of the Rural Okrug and Khatyryk-Khomo. It is located 215 kilometers (134 mi) from Sangar, the administrative center of the district and 40 kilometers (25 mi) from Aryktakh. Its population as of the 2002 Census was 216.
