= Otto Kalvitsa =

Finnish-born Soviet aviator (1888–1930)

- Отто Кальвиц (Кальвица)
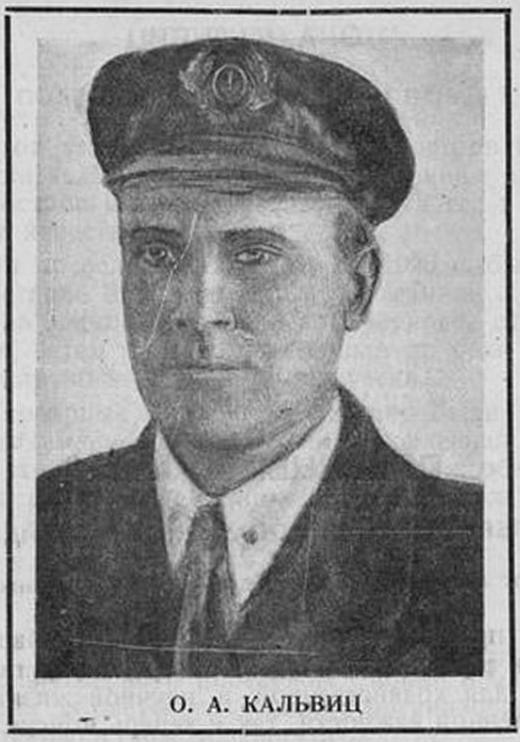
- Otto Kalvitsa in the Dobrolyot uniform
- Born: 21 November 1888; Kontiolahti, Grand Duchy of Finland, Russian Empire
- Died: 7 March 1930 (aged 41); Sangar, Yakut ASSR, Soviet Union
- Military career
- Allegiance: Red Finland; Russian SFSR; Soviet Union
- Branch: Finnish Red Guard; Soviet Naval Aviation
- Service years: 1918–1926
- Conflicts: Russian Civil War; Finnish Civil War

Otto Kalvitsa (Russian: Отто Артурович Кальвиц, sometimes spelled Кальвица; 21 November 1888 – 7 March 1930) was a Finnish-born Soviet aviator and a polar explorer. He is known as one of the pioneers of the Soviet Arctic aviation.

== Life ==
=== Early years ===
Otto Kalvitsa was born as a carpenter's son in the village of Kontiolahti, Northern Karelia. After finishing the elementary school, Kalvitsa entered the industrial school in Helsingfors on his father's expense. Kalvitsa also took some drawing lessons in the Academy of Fine Arts. In 1903, Kalvitsa left the industrial school and started working for Hietalahti Shipyard and Engineering Works to finance his studies. In 1907–1912, Kalvitsa sailed on the ships of the Finland Steamship Company and finally finished his studies in 1913, graduating as a steam engine operator. For the next four years, Kalvitsa worked in the steam liners of the lake Päijänne. He was active in the labour movement since the 1905 general strike, and also participated the strike supporting the 1906 Sveaborg Rebellion.

=== Finnish Civil War ===
As the Finnish Civil War broke out in January 1918, Kalvitsa lived in Lahti. He joined the local Red Guard and was sent to Heinola, where he first served in gun repair and was later named as the "fleet commissar". In the late April, Kalvitsa joined fleeing Reds and finally ended up in the coastal town of Kotka. On 4 May, he was evacuated to Petrograd by a steam ship. After a month in the Buy refugee camp in the Kostroma Governorate, Kalvitsa and three other Reds returned to Petrograd. They were appointed by the Finnish revolutionaries Eino Rahja and Evert Eloranta to sneak into Finland as spies. After crossing the border on 2 August, they were soon captured by Finnish Whites in Antrea, where one of the men was killed in a gunfight. Kalvitsa was sentenced for 10 years in prison, but in January 1919, he managed to escape from the forced labour camp in Vyborg and fled to Russia.

=== Pilot in the Soviet Union ===
Back in Petrograd, Kalvitsa joined the Petrograd Red Commander School but was soon transferred to the Naval Aviation School in Samara. Graduating in 1920, Kalvitsa became one of the nine Finnish pilots who served the Baltic Fleet Naval Aviation during the Russian Civil War. In March 1921, he took part on the suppression of the Kronstadt rebellion and also fought against the Finnish Whites in the 1921–1922 East Karelian uprising.

In May 1923, Kalvitsa was badly injured in a plane crash, but returned to service. In August–September 1925, Kalvitsa made his first arctic flight as he flew with the Russian pilot Boris Chukhnovsky from Leningrad via Arkhangelsk to Novaya Zemlya, each piloting a Junkers Ju 20 floatplane. The mission was to survey ship routes for the Northern Sea Route. Kalvitsa and Chudnovsky were particularly exploring the waters of Matochkin Strait between the Severny and Yuzhny Islands of Novaya Zemlya. From June to August 1926, Kalvitsa participated in Georgy Ushakov's expedition to Herald and Wrangel islands, piloting a Junkers F 13 floatplane that was transported aboard the icebreaking steamer Stavropol to survey the area in search of a location for the first Soviet colony on Wrangel Island.

In 1927, Kalvitsa left the Naval Aviation and joined the civil aviation organization Dobrolyot, the precursor of Aeroflot. He flew the route between Verkhneudinsk and the Mongolian capital Ulan Bator. A year later, Kalvitsa was transferred to Irkutsk where he earned the nickname "Northern Wolf", due to his skillful flying in extreme weather conditions. In the summer of 1929, Kalvitsa explored the Arctic Sea coastline in the Chukchi Peninsula and Yakutia. The three-week journey also included a visit to the newly established colony in Wrangel Island. Kalvitsa flew a German Junkers W 33 with the Austro-Hungarian revolutionary Franz Leonhard as his flight mechanic. The journey finally ended on 18 August as Kalvitsa landed the severely damaged plane in Bulun (a now-abolished village in Bulunsky District, Yakutia, located near Kyusyur on the opposite bank of the Lena River).

=== Death ===
On 5 March 1930, Kalvitsa was ordered to fly medical supplies to Bulun (Bulunsky District, Yakutia) for OGPU personnel injured in a recent uprising. Two days later, Kalvitsa took off from Yakutsk with the intention of flying to Bulun via Zhigansk (where he was supposed to drop off a passenger—a radio operator and his equipment), but in a heavy snowstorm his Junkers W 33 crashed onto the ice of the Lena River near the village of Sangar. Kalvitsa, Franz Leonhard and a passenger—the radio operator S. S. Karchevsky—died.

== Commemoration ==
Kalvitsa and Leonhard were buried in the mass grave of the revolutionary heroes in the Jerusalem Cemetery in Irkutsk. Their memorial is composed of an aircraft propeller attached to a standing stone. Another memorial was later erected near the crash site.

The village of Kalvitsa in the Sakha Republic and the bay Zaliv Kalvitsa in Novaya Zemlya are named after him.

== Memoir ==
Kalvitsa's memoir Jäämerilentäjän päiväkirjasta (″From the Diary of an Arctic Pilot″) was published posthumously in 1930. The book was edited by Finnish socialists Santeri Mäkelä and Ragnar Rusko. It was also published in the United States by Finnish-American socialists.
