= Kobyaysky District =

Kobyaysky District Кобяйский улус (Russian)
- District

Other transcription(s)
  - Yakut: Кэбээйи улууһа
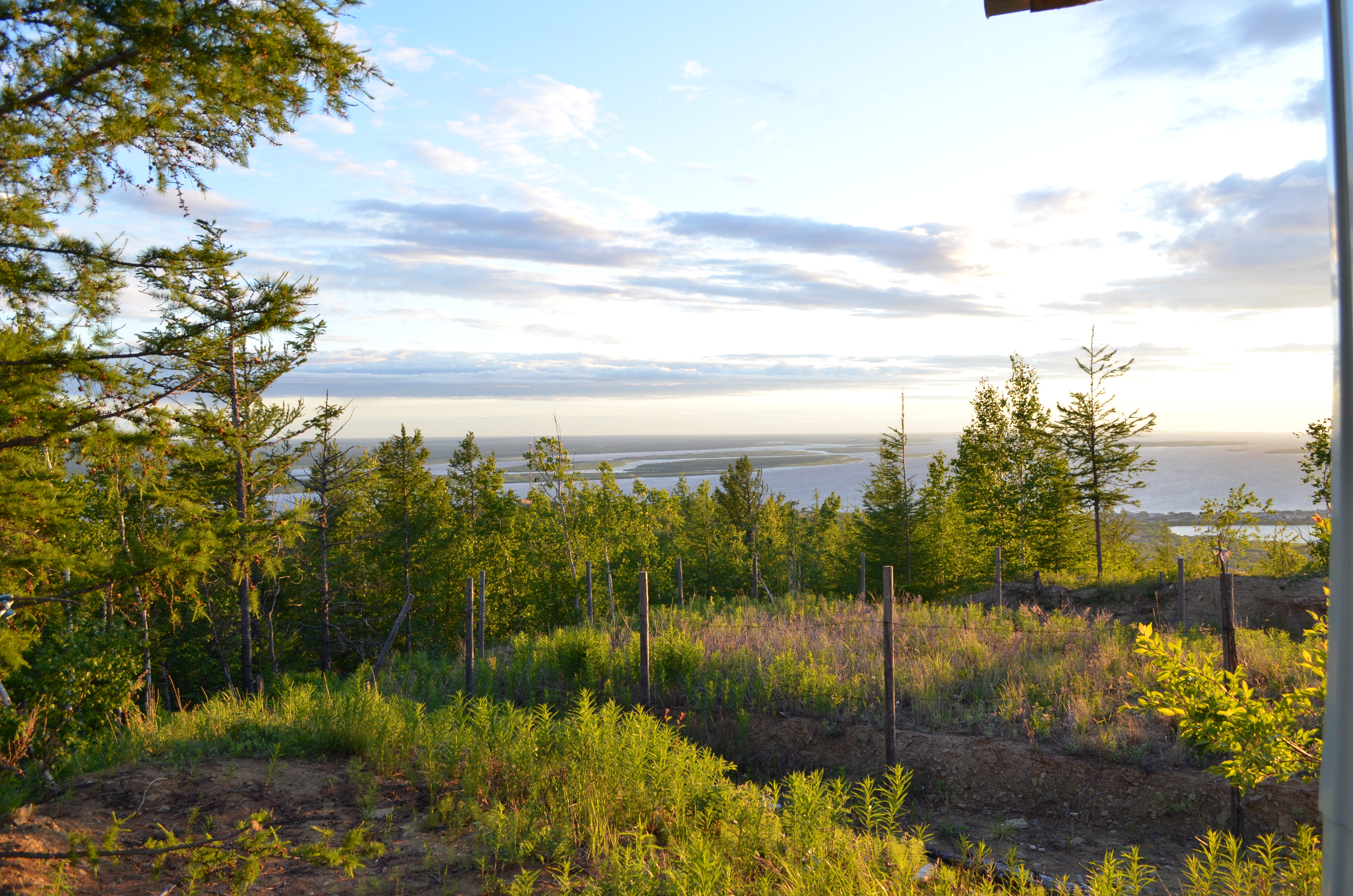
- View of Kobyasky District near the urban-type settlement of Sangar

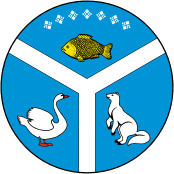
- Flag Coat of arms
- Anthem: Anthem of Kobyaysky District
- Location of Kobyaysky District in the Sakha Republic
- Coordinates: 63°55′N 127°28′E
- Country: Russia
- Federal subject: Sakha Republic
- Established: April 20, 1937
- Administrative center: Sangar

Area
  - Total: 107,800 km^{2} (41,600 sq mi)

Population (2010 Census)
  - Total: 13,680
  - Density: 0.1269/km^{2} (0.3287/sq mi)
  - Urban: 32.0%
  - Rural: 68.0%

Administrative structure
  - Administrative divisions: 1 Settlements, 11 Rural okrugs
  - Inhabited localities: 1 urban-type settlements, 22 rural localities

Municipal structure
  - Municipally incorporated as: Kobyaysky Municipal District
  - Municipal divisions: 1 urban settlements, 11 rural settlements
- Time zone: UTC+
- OKTMO ID: 98624000

Kobyaysky District (Russian: Кобяйский улу́с; Yakut: Кэбээйи улууһа, Kebeeyi uluuha, [kebeːji uluːha]) is an administrative and municipal district (raion, or ulus), one of the thirty-four in the Sakha Republic, Russia. It is located in the center of the republic on the Vilyuy River, 334 kilometers (208 mi) by road north of the republic's capital of Yakutsk. The area of the district is 107,800 square kilometers (41,600 sq mi). Its administrative center is the urban-type settlement of Sangar. As of the 2010 Census, the total population of the district was 13,680, with the population of Sangar accounting for 32.0% of that number.

== Geography ==
Mountainous areas are located in the north and northeast of the district, with the Kuturgin Range, Muosuchan Range, Munni Range and Ust-Vilyuy Range, subranges of the Verkhoyansk Range, while the rest of the district is part of the Central Yakutian Lowland.

Several rivers flow through the district. These include the Lena River, which flows between the mouths of tributaries of the Aldan, the Linde, and its tributary the Vilyuy in the lower reaches, as well as the Kenkeme, Tyugyuene, Sitte, Tympylykan, Khanchaly, Belyanka, the Tumara and the Nuora. The largest of the district's lowland lakes is Nedzheli. A part of the Ust-Vilyuysky National Park is also located on the district's territory.

=== Climate ===
Due to the sub-polar location, it is bitterly cold in the winter months, with an average January temperature of −36 °C (−33 °F) in the mountains and −40 °C (−40 °F) in the valley, and in July over +10 °C (50 °F) in the mountains and over +18 °C (64 °F) in the valley. Annual precipitation ranges from 200–250 millimeters (7.9–9.8 in) in the east to 500–600 millimeters (20–24 in) in the mountains.

== History ==
The territory of what is now Kobyaysky District has long been settled by the Even, Evenk, and Yakut peoples. Silver-lead deposits were found in Yendybalskoye as early as 1765. In 1913, the coal potential of the area was noted and coal mining began at Tsugaru in the late 1920s. The first elementary school opened in Kobyay in 1926. In 1928, as the coal mining operations got underway, the miners established the new village of Sangar. In 1931, the first collective farms began to appear, and the first medical dispensary in the area was opened at Tsugaru mine, with the first pharmacy opening a year later. In 1936, a fishing organization was established in the area to unite the small fishing enterprises that had begun to develop.

Kobyaysky District was formed on April 20, 1937 from the remote territories of Namsky, Gorny, and Vilyuysky Districts, with the district's administrative center located in Kobyay. In 1959, however, the administrative center was moved to Sangar. In 1938, thermal power stations operating on coal were built in Sangar, and the first library opened in Kobyay. By 1939, the two main villages were connected by radio and in 1946 with a telephone station. In September 1942, 2,482 were recorded as moving into the district. In 1944, the district newspaper Sana oloh (renamed Leninets in 1962 and Dabaan in 1993) was established, and in 1945 an airport was commissioned, 5 kilometers (3.1 mi) from Sangar. The first savings bank opened in 1946 and on April 16, 1947, Sangar commissioned a new steam turbine power plant.

In 1952, the oil and gas reserves of the area began to be exploited, and over the next few years there was extensive planning and drilling to find these reserves. In 1957, mass carp fishing began on Lake Nidzhili. In 1963, the construction of a 400-kilometer (250 mi) gas pipeline Taas–Tumus–Berge–Yakutsk–Mokhsogollokh began—the first in the world on permafrost and in a sub-polar climate. Several schools were established in the district in the 1960s and 1970s, with the folk theater opened in 1973 and Kobyay children's music school in 1974. The oil and gas industry developed extensively during the 1980s and 1990s.

On February 1, 2006, at a frequency of 102 FM, radio NEC "Sakha" started broadcasting.

== Administrative and municipal status ==
Within the framework of administrative divisions, Kobyaysky District is one of the thirty-four in the republic. It is divided into one settlement (an administrative division with the administrative center in the urban-type settlement (inhabited locality) of Sangar) and eleven rural okrugs (naslegs), all of which comprise twenty-two rural localities. As a municipal division, the district is incorporated as Kobyaysky Municipal District. The Settlement of Sangar is incorporated into an urban settlement, and the eleven rural okrugs are incorporated into eleven rural settlements within the municipal district. The urban-type settlement of Sangar serves as the administrative center of both the administrative and municipal district.

=== Inhabited localities ===
Administrative/municipal composition
Settlements/Urban settlements	Population	Inhabited localities in jurisdiction
Sangar (Сангар)	4657	**Urban-type settlement of Sangar** (administrative center of the district); selo of Aviaport; selo of Smorodichny
Rural okrugs/Rural settlements	Population	Rural localities in jurisdiction*
Aryktakhsky (Арыктахский)	509	**selo of Aryktakh**; selo of Lyuksyugyun; selo of Khatyryk-Khomo
Kirovsky (Кировский)	628	**selo of Segyan-Kyuyol**; selo of Batamay
Kobyaysky (Кобяйский)	2605	**selo of Kobyay**; selo of Oyun-Unguokhtakh; selo of Saga
Kuokuysky (Куокуйский)	828	**selo of Argas**; selo of Kalvitsa
Lamynkhinsky (Ламынхинский)	796	**selo of Sebyan-Kyuyol**
Lyuchcheginsky 1-y (Люччегинский 1-й)	256	**selo of Bagadya**; selo of Arylakh
Lyuchcheginsky 2-y (Люччегинский 2-й)	658	**selo of Mastakh**; selo of Byranattalakh; selo of Mastakh 2-y
Mukuchunsky (Мукучунский)	1221	**selo of Sayylyk**
Nizhilinsky (Нижилинский)	542	**selo of Chagda**
Sittinsky (Ситтинский)	503	**selo of Sitte**
Tyayinsky (Тыайинский)	477	**selo of Tyaya**

*Administrative centers are shown in bold

== Economy ==
The leading industry is agriculture, with cattle, pig, horse breeding, reindeer husbandry, poultry farming, cellular farming, fisheries, mining, and furs forming much of the main economic activity in the district. There are 59,200 hectares (146,000 acres) of arable land, with some 66.3% of it being hayfields. The district has notable deposits of gold, silver, lead, zinc, gas, coal, and building materials. In 1998, upon the decision of the Russian Ministry of Energy, the Tsugaru coal mine was closed. In 2000, a fire broke out. In 2008, the Mastakhskoye gas-condensate field was in the final stages of development.

The district has a number of facilities such as printing houses, clubs, a theater in Kobyay, and vocational, educational, sports, and children's art schools.

The Sangar Airport is the main airport in the district.

== Demographics ==
Population of Kobyaysky District
- 2021 Census: 11,352
- 2010 Census: 13,680
- 2002 Census: 14,178
- 1989 Census: 20,352
- 1979 Census: 18,914

As of the 2021 Census, the ethnic composition was as follows:

- Yakuts: 73%
- Russians: 17%
- Evens: 8%
- other ethnicities: 2%
