= Chagda =

Chagda (Russian: Чагда) is the name of several rural localities in the Sakha Republic, Russia:

- Chagda, Aldansky District, Sakha Republic, a selo in Chagdinsky Rural Okrug of Aldansky District
- Chagda, Kobyaysky District, Sakha Republic, a selo in Nizhilinsky Rural Okrug of Kobyaysky District
