= Kalvitsa, Russia =

Kalvitsa Кальвица
- Selo
- Interactive map of Kalvitsa
- Location of Kalvitsa Kalvitsa (Sakha Republic)
- Coordinates: 63°56′18″N 127°01′13″E
- Country: Russia
- Federal subject: Sakha Republic
- Administrative district: Kobyaysky District
- Rural okrugSelsoviet: Kuokuysky Rural Okrug

Population
  - Estimate (2002): 177 )

Municipal status
  - Municipal district: Kobyaysky Municipal District
  - Rural settlement: Kuokuysky Rural Settlement
- Time zone: UTC+
- Postal code: 678300
- OKTMO ID: 98624424106

Kalvitsa (Russian: Кальвица) is a rural locality (a selo) in Kuokuysky Rural Okrug of Kobyaysky District in the Sakha Republic, Russia, . Its population as of the 2002 Census was 177.

The village is named after the Finnish-born Soviet aviator and polar explorer Otto Kalvitsa.

== Geography ==
Kalvitsa is located in the Central Yakutian Lowland, central Yakutia, on the left bank of the Tyugyuene river, at a distance of 22 kilometers (14 mi) —in a straight line— from Sangar, the administrative center of the district, and 30 kilometers (19 mi) from Argas, the administrative center of the rural okrug.
