= Mastakh 2-y =

Mastakh 2-y Мастах 2-й
- Selo
- Interactive map of Mastakh 2-y
- Location of Mastakh 2-y Mastakh 2-y (Sakha Republic)
- Coordinates: 63°44′27″N 124°13′15″E
- Country: Russia
- Federal subject: Sakha Republic
- Administrative district: Kobyaysky District
- Rural okrugSelsoviet: Luchcheginsky 2-y Rural Okrug

Population
  - Estimate (2002): 23 )

Municipal status
  - Municipal district: Kobyaysky Municipal District
  - Rural settlement: Luchcheginsky 2-y Rural Settlement
- Time zone: UTC+
- Postal code: 678313
- OKTMO ID: 98624435111

Mastakh 2-y (Russian: Мастах 2-й, pronounced Mastakh Vtoroy) is a rural locality (a selo), and one of three settlements in Luchcheginsky 2-y Rural Okrug of Kobyaysky District in the Sakha Republic, Russia, in addition to Mastakh, the administrative center of the Rural Okrug and Byranattalakh. It is located 282 kilometers (175 mi) from Sangar, the administrative center of the district and 3 kilometers (1.9 mi) from Mastakh. Its population as of the 2002 Census was 23.
