= Tympylykan =

River in Yakutia (Sakha Republic), Russia

Tympylykan Тымпылыкан / Тымпылыкаан
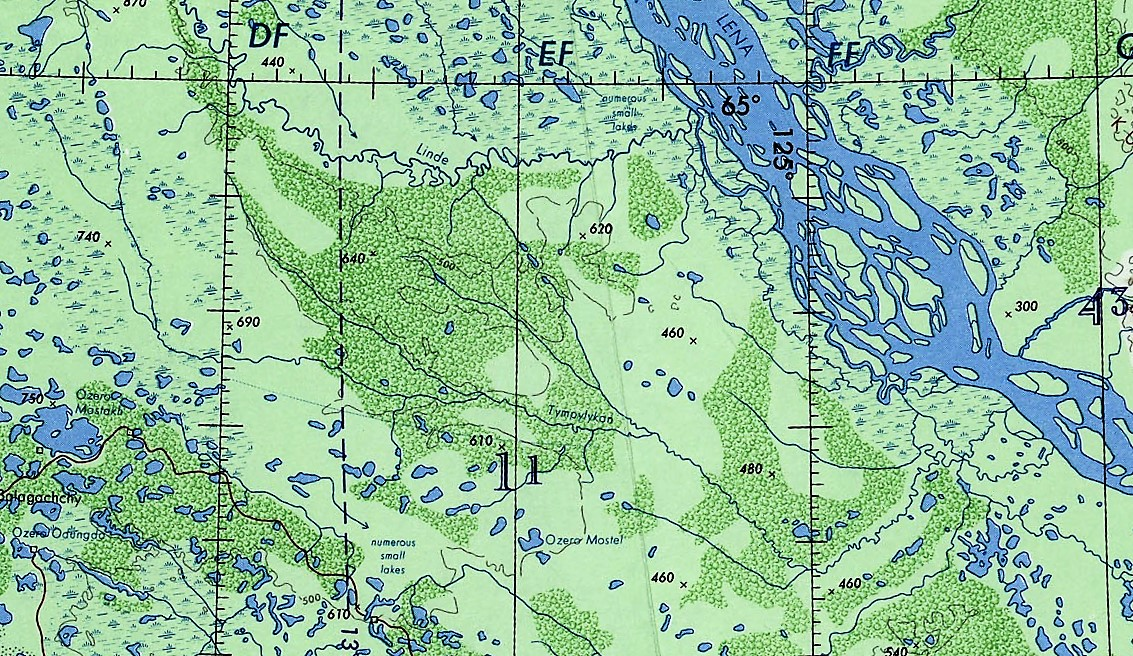
- Course of the Tympylykan

- Mouth location in Yakutia, Russia

Location
- Country: Russia

Physical characteristics
- Source
  - location: Central Yakutian Lowland
  - coordinates: 64°55′12″N 122°17′10″E
  - elevation: ca 208 m (682 ft)
- Mouth: Lena
  - coordinates: 64°27′13″N 125°30′34″E
- Length: 357 km (222 mi)
- Basin size: 5,130 square kilometres (1,980 mi^{2})

Basin features
- Progression: Lena→ Laptev Sea

The Tympylykan (Russian: Тымпылыкан, Yakut: Тымпылыкаан, Tımpılıkaan) is a river in the Sakha Republic (Yakutia), Russia. It is a left tributary of the Lena. Its length is 357 kilometres (222 mi) and the area of its basin is 5,130 square kilometres (1,980 sq mi).

The basin of the Tympylykan falls fully within the Central Yakutian Lowland. It flows across the Kobyaysky and Vilyuysky districts. The banks of the river are uninhabited.

== Geography ==
The Tympylykan originates in an area of swamps and small lakes of the Central Yakutian Lowland. It flows first in a SSE direction and then roughly southeastwards to the south of the Linde within a wide floodplain. Towards the last stretch of its course it bends and flows northeastwards, meandering among marshes and lakes. Finally it meets the left bank of the Lena 1,086 kilometres (675 mi) upstream of its mouth in the Laptev Sea. The Lyapiske has its mouth roughly on the opposite side of the Lena.

The main tributaries of the Tympylykan are the 74 km (46 mi) long Achchygyi-Tympylykan and 66 km (41 mi) long Konkyus-Mande from the left, as well as the 52 km (32 mi) long Yogdyonyu from the right.

Basin of the Lena

== See also ==
- List of rivers of Russia
