= Saga, Russia =

Saga Сага
- Selo
- Location of Saga
- Location of Saga Saga (Sakha Republic)
- Coordinates: 63°43′53″N 126°26′51″E
- Country: Russia
- Federal subject: Sakha Republic
- Administrative district: Kobyaysky District
- Rural okrug: Kobyaysky Rural Okrug

Population
  - Estimate (2002): 0

Municipal status
  - Municipal district: Kobyaysky Municipal District
  - Rural settlement: Kobyaysky Rural Settlement
- Time zone: UTC+9 (MSK+6)
- Postal code(s): 678310
- OKTMO ID: 98624419111

Saga (Russian: Сага) is a rural locality (a selo) in Kobyaysky Rural Okrug of Kobyaysky District in the Sakha Republic, Russia, located 100 kilometers (62 mi) from Sangar, the administrative center of the district, and 20 kilometers (12 mi) from Kobyay, the administrative center of the rural okrug. As of the 2002 Census, it had no recorded population.
