= Sitte =

Sitte may refer to:

== Places ==
- Sitte, Kobyaysky District, Sakha Republic, a selo in Mukhuchunsky Rural Okrug of Kobyaysky District of the Sakha Republic
- Sitte (river), Russia

== People with the surname ==
- Camillo Sitte (1843–1903), Austrian architect, painter and city planning theoretician
- Kurt Sitte (1910–1993), German nuclear physicist
- Margaret Sitte, American politician
- Petra Sitte (born 1960), German politician
- Willi Sitte (1921–2013), German painter

== See also ==
- Sittee River, a river in Belize
