= Aviaport, Kobyaysky District, Sakha Republic =

Aviaport Авиапорт
- Selo
- Location of Aviaport
- Location of Aviaport Aviaport (Sakha Republic)
- Coordinates: 63°57′26″N 127°26′14″E
- Country: Russia
- Federal subject: Sakha Republic
- Administrative district: Kobyaysky District
- Urban okrug: Sangar Urban Okrug

Population
  - Estimate (2002): 371

Municipal status
  - Municipal district: Kobyaysky Municipal District
  - Rural settlement: Sangar Urban Settlement
- Time zone: UTC+9 (MSK+6)
- Postal code(s): 678300
- OKTMO ID: 98624151106

Aviaport (Russian: Авиапорт) is a rural locality (a selo), and one of three settlements in Sangar Urban Okrug of Kobyaysky District in the Sakha Republic, Russia, in addition to Sangar, the administrative center of the Urban Okrug and Smorodichny. It is located 5 kilometers (3.1 mi) from Sangar, the administrative center of the district. Its population as of the 2002 Census was 371.
