= Sayylyk, Kobyaysky District, Sakha Republic =

Sayylyk Сайылык
- Selo
- Interactive map of Sayylyk
- Location of Sayylyk Sayylyk (Sakha Republic)
- Coordinates: 63°51′N 123°50′E
- Country: Russia
- Federal subject: Sakha Republic
- Administrative district: Kobyaysky District
- Rural okrugSelsoviet: Mukuchunsky Rural Okrug

Population (2010 Census)
  - Total: 1,221
  - Estimate (2021): 1,128 (−7.6%)

Administrative status
  - Capital of: Mukuchunsky Rural Okrug

Municipal status
  - Municipal district: Kobyaysky Municipal District
  - Rural settlement: Mukuchunsky Rural Settlement
  - Capital of: Mukuchunsky Rural Settlement
- Time zone: UTC+
- Postal code: 678321
- OKTMO ID: 98624440101

Sayylyk (Russian: Сайылык; Yakut: Сайылык, Sayılık) is a rural locality (a selo), the only inhabited locality, and the administrative center of Mukuchunsky Rural Okrug of Kobyaysky District in the Sakha Republic, Russia, located 315 kilometers (196 mi) from Sangar, the administrative center of the district. Its population as of the 2010 Census was 1,221, up from 1,156 recorded during the 2002 Census.
