= Sebyan-Kyuyol =

Sebyan-Kyuyol Себян-Кюёль
- Selo
- Interactive map of Sebyan-Kyuyol
- Location of Sebyan-Kyuyol Sebyan-Kyuyol (Sakha Republic)
- Coordinates: 65°17′38″N 130°00′52″E
- Country: Russia
- Federal subject: Sakha Republic
- Administrative district: Kobyaysky District
- Rural okrugSelsoviet: Lamynkhinsky National Rural Okrug

Population (2010 Census)
  - Total: 796
  - Estimate (2021): 774 (−2.8%)

Administrative status
  - Capital of: Lamynkhinsky National Rural Okrug

Municipal status
  - Municipal district: Kobyaysky Municipal District
  - Rural settlement: Lamynkhinsky National Rural Settlement
  - Capital of: Lamynkhinsky National Rural Settlement
- Time zone: UTC+
- Postal code: 678318
- OKTMO ID: 98624429101

Sebyan-Kyuyol (Russian: Себян-Кюёль; Yakut: Сэбээн Күөл, Sebeen Küöl) is a rural locality (a selo), the only inhabited locality, and the administrative center of Lamynkhinsky National Rural Okrug of Kobyaysky District in the Sakha Republic, Russia, located 460 kilometers (290 mi) from Sangar, the administrative center of the district. Its population as of the 2010 Census was 796, of whom 396 were male and 400 female, up from 765 recorded during the 2002 Census.
