= Oyun-Unguokhtakh =

Oyun-Unguokhtakh Ойун-Унгуохтах
- Selo
- Interactive map of Oyun-Unguokhtakh
- Location of Oyun-Unguokhtakh Oyun-Unguokhtakh (Sakha Republic)
- Coordinates: 63°49′N 126°32′E
- Country: Russia
- Federal subject: Sakha Republic
- Administrative district: Kobyaysky District
- Rural okrugSelsoviet: Kobyaysky Rural Okrug

Population
  - Estimate (2002): 0 )

Municipal status
  - Municipal district: Kobyaysky Municipal District
  - Rural settlement: Kobyaysky Rural Settlement
- Time zone: UTC+
- Postal code: 678310
- OKTMO ID: 98624419106

Oyun-Unguokhtakh (Russian: Ойун-Унгуохтах or Оюн-Унгуохтах) is a rural locality (a selo) in Kobyaysky Rural Okrug of Kobyaysky District in the Sakha Republic, Russia, located 85 kilometers (53 mi) from Sangar, the administrative center of the district and 35 kilometers (22 mi) from Kobyay, the administrative center of the rural okrug. It had no population as of the 2002 Census.

== Geography ==
The village is located by the Lungkha river.
