= Argas, Sakha Republic =

Argas Аргас
- Selo

Other transcription(s)
  - Yakut: Арҕас
- Interactive map of Argas
- Location of Argas Argas (Sakha Republic)
- Coordinates: 63°57′50″N 126°37′02″E
- Country: Russia
- Federal subject: Sakha Republic
- Administrative district: Kobyaysky District
- Rural okrugSelsoviet: Kuokuysky Rural Okrug
- Elevation: 59 m (194 ft)

Population
  - Estimate (2002): 616 )

Administrative status
  - Capital of: Kuokuysky Rural Okrug

Municipal status
  - Municipal district: Kobyaysky Municipal District
  - Rural settlement: Kuokuysky Rural Settlement
  - Capital of: Kuokuysky Rural Settlement
- Time zone: UTC+
- Postal code: 678322
- OKTMO ID: 98624424101

Argas (Russian: Аргас; Yakut: Арҕас, romanized: Arğas) is a rural locality (a selo), the administrative centre of and one of two settlements, in addition to Kalvitsa, in Kuokuysky Rural Okrug of Kobyaysky District in the Sakha Republic, Russia. It is located 60 kilometers (37 mi) from Sangar, the administrative center of the district. Its population as of the 2002 Census was 616.

== Geography ==
The village is located by the Lungkha river.
