= Khatyryk-Khomo =

Khatyryk-Khomo Хатырык-Хомо
- Selo
- Interactive map of Khatyryk-Khomo
- Location of Khatyryk-Khomo Khatyryk-Khomo (Sakha Republic)
- Coordinates: 63°56′59″N 124°49′34″E
- Country: Russia
- Federal subject: Sakha Republic
- Administrative district: Kobyaysky District
- Rural okrugSelsoviet: Aryktakhsky Rural Okrug

Population
  - Estimate (2002): 2 )

Municipal status
  - Municipal district: Kobyaysky Municipal District
  - Rural settlement: Aryktakhsky Rural Settlement
- Time zone: UTC+
- Postal code: 678320
- OKTMO ID: 98624405111

Khatyryk-Khomo (Russian: Хатырык-Хомо) is a rural locality (a selo) in Aryktakhsky Rural Okrug of Kobyaysky District in the Sakha Republic, Russia, located 280 kilometers (170 mi) from Sangar, the administrative center of the district, and 85 kilometers (53 mi) from Aryktakh, the administrative center of the rural okrug. Its population as of the 2002 Census was 2.

== Climate ==
Khatyryk-Khomo has an extreme subarctic climate (Köppen climate classification Dwd). Winters are extremely cold with average temperature of −38.9 °C (−38 °F) in January, while summers are mild to warm, with average temperature of 17.3 °C (63 °F) in July. Precipitation is quite low in winters, being mostly concentrated in summer and early autumn.

Climate data for Khatyryk-Khomo (1959-1977)
Month	Jan	Feb	Mar	Apr	May	Jun	Jul	Aug	Sep	Oct	Nov	Dec	Year
Record high °C (°F)	−16.1 (3.0)	−16.0 (3.2)	1.0 (33.8)	8.9 (48.0)	24.0 (75.2)	31.1 (88.0)	33.9 (93.0)	36.1 (97.0)	22.8 (73.0)	7.8 (46.0)	−2.2 (28.0)	−11.1 (12.0)	36.1 (97.0)
Mean daily maximum °C (°F)	−36.3 (−33.3)	−29.5 (−21.1)	−15.7 (3.7)	−3.7 (25.3)	9.1 (48.4)	18.8 (65.8)	23.0 (73.4)	19.6 (67.3)	10.2 (50.4)	−5.8 (21.6)	−25.1 (−13.2)	−34.3 (−29.7)	−5.2 (22.6)
Daily mean °C (°F)	−38.9 (−38.0)	−33.3 (−27.9)	−21.5 (−6.7)	−9.5 (14.9)	4.5 (40.1)	13.7 (56.7)	17.3 (63.1)	13.7 (56.7)	5.2 (41.4)	−9.1 (15.6)	−28.1 (−18.6)	−37.2 (−35.0)	−9.6 (14.7)
Mean daily minimum °C (°F)	−42.2 (−44.0)	−38.4 (−37.1)	−28.8 (−19.8)	−17.5 (0.5)	−1.6 (29.1)	7.7 (45.9)	10.7 (51.3)	7.2 (45.0)	0.0 (32.0)	−13.0 (8.6)	−32.4 (−26.3)	−40.9 (−41.6)	−15.2 (4.6)
Record low °C (°F)	−53.9 (−65.0)	−53.9 (−65.0)	−46.1 (−51.0)	−42.8 (−45.0)	−17.8 (0.0)	−2.8 (27.0)	−1.1 (30.0)	−7.2 (19.0)	−10.0 (14.0)	−30.0 (−22.0)	−51.1 (−60.0)	−53.9 (−65.0)	−53.9 (−65.0)
Average precipitation mm (inches)	11.5 (0.45)	10.8 (0.43)	36.7 (1.44)	29.7 (1.17)	6.0 (0.24)	50.6 (1.99)	30.6 (1.20)	66.1 (2.60)	103.3 (4.07)	111.1 (4.37)	25.8 (1.02)	6.4 (0.25)	488.6 (19.24)
