= Lungkha =

River in Yakutia, Russia

Lungkha Лунгха / Луҥха
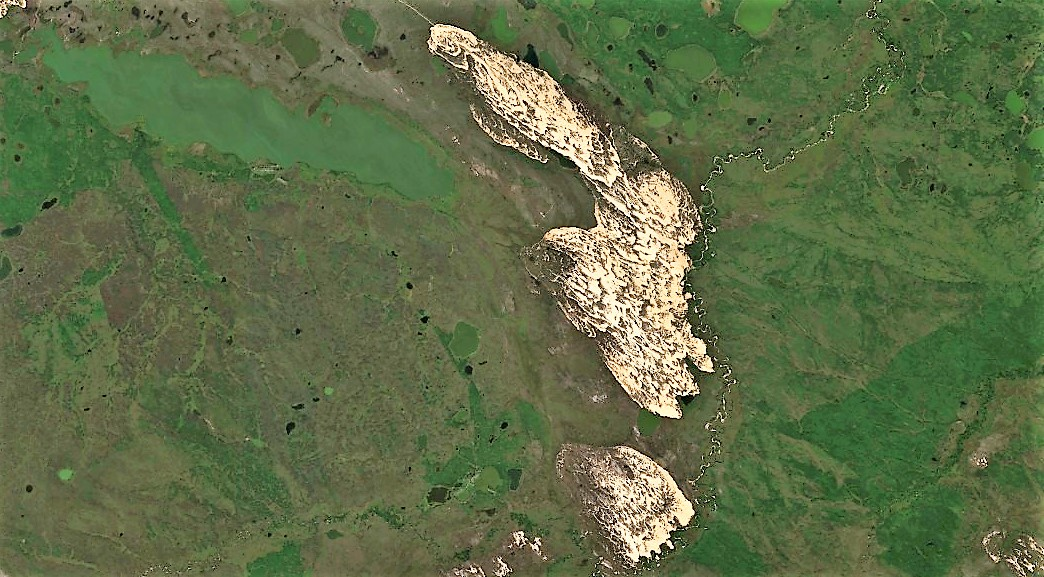
- The Lungkha flowing east of a Tukulan Sentinel-2 image. Lake Nedzheli in the upper left.

- Mouth location in Yakutia, Russia

Location
- Country: Russia

Physical characteristics
- Source
  - location: Lena Plateau
  - coordinates: 62°58′31″N 124°45′10″E
  - elevation: 240 m (790 ft)
- Mouth: Lena
  - coordinates: 64°10′12″N 126°42′27″E
  - elevation: 57 m (187 ft)
- Length: 508 km (316 mi)
- Basin size: 10,300 km^{2} (4,000 sq mi)
- Discharge
  - average: 24 m^{3}/s (850 cu ft/s)

Basin features
- Progression: Lena→ Laptev Sea

The Lungkha (Russian: Лунгха; Yakut: Луҥха, Luŋxa) is a river in Yakutia (Sakha Republic), Russia. It is the 14th longest tributary of the Lena with a length of 508 kilometres (316 mi) —533 kilometres (331 mi) counting its Yychaky tributary. Its drainage basin area is 10,300 square kilometres (4,000 mi^{2}).

A331 highway passes close to the river near its origin. The villages of Oyun-Unguokhtakh, Argas and Taas-Tumus are located by the river. The last 72 kilometres (45 mi) stretch of the Lungkha is navigable.

== Course ==
The Lungkha is a left tributary of the Lena. It is formed at the confluence of the Yychaky and Yulagir rivers in the northern part of the Lena Plateau. It flows in a roughly northeastern direction nearly parallel to the Tyugyuene to the east. In its middle course it descends into the Central Yakutian Lowland where it meanders within a wide floodplain parallel to the lower course of the Vilyuy further north. Finally it meets the left bank of the Lena 1,132 kilometres (703 mi) from its mouth and 30 kilometres (19 mi) upstream from the mouth of the Vilyuy. The river basin is fed by rain and snow. Floods are common in the summer period.

=== Tributaries ===
The largest tributaries of the Lungkha are the 87 km (54 mi) long Tokhoron and the 315 km (196 mi) long Khatyng-Yuryakh, both from the right. The river freezes between October and May.

Basin of the Lena.

== Flora and fauna ==
The vegetation of the Lungkha basin is marked by middle taiga landscape. The snow cover in the river basin lasts an average of 220 days yearly.

The main fish species in the river are pike, ide and perch.

== See also ==
- List of rivers of Russia
