= Chara Depression =

Geological depression in the Russian Far East

The Chara Depression (also known as the Chara Basin) is an intermontane depression located in the northern part of Zabaykalsky Krai in the Russian Far East.

The climate causes stagnated cold air, which leads to an absence of trees and the formation of sand dunes known as tukulans.

== Literature ==
- Garashchenko, A. V. (1993). Flora and Vegetation of the Upper Chara Basin (Northern Transbaikalia) (in Russian). Novosibirsk.
