= Nedzheli =

Lake in Russia

- Нидили / Нидьили
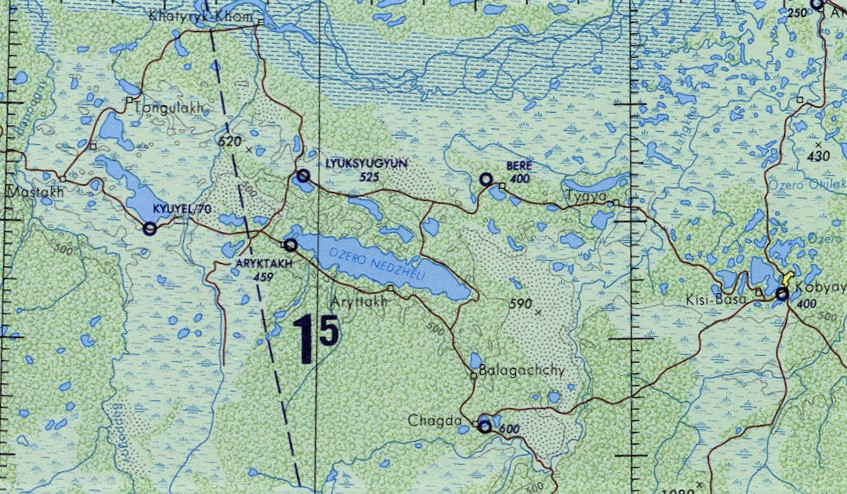
- Nedzheli map section

- Location in the Sakha Republic, Russian Far East
- Location: Sakha Republic, Russia
- Coordinates: 63°35′50″N 125°12′18″E
- Primary inflows: Kyunkyuy and Kharya-Yuryakh
- Primary outflows: Sien (Сиэн)
- Catchment area: 1,010 km^{2} (390 sq mi)
- Basin countries: Russia
- Max. length: 33.5 km (20.8 mi)
- Max. width: 6 km (3.7 mi)
- Surface area: 119 km^{2} (46 sq mi)
- Average depth: 3 m (9.8 ft)
- Max. depth: 7 m (23 ft)
- Surface elevation: 138 m (453 ft)
- Frozen: September / October to June
- Islands: None

Nedzheli (Russian: Ниди́ли or Ниджили; Yakut: Нидьили, romanized: Nicili) is a lake in Kobyaysky District, Sakha Republic (Yakutia), Russia.

The lake is a protected area of regional significance.

== Geography ==
Nedzheli is located near the Lena, about 60 km (37 mi) —in a straight line— southwest of the village of Sangar. It is the largest lake in the Central Yakut Plain (Leno-Vilyui interfluve) and the 9th largest in Yakutia. The lake is elongated in an east to west direction. It is fed mainly by snow and freezes between late September / early October and mid June.

== Flora and fauna ==
The vegetation of the area surrounding the Nedzheli is mainly larch and pine taiga.

The lake is rich in fish. The crucian carp variety of the Nedzheli is highly appreciated in Yakutia and has been introduced to other lakes in the region. Siberian cranes, black-headed gulls, river terns, Eurasian teals, ruffs and diving ducks are common in the shores of the lake. In former times the Nedzheli used to be a breeding place of the common goldeneye, but since the local people began to use motor boats the population declined dramatically.

== See also ==
- List of lakes of Russia
