= Khanchaly =

River in Yakutia (Sakha Republic), Russia

Khanchaly Ханчалы / Ханчылы
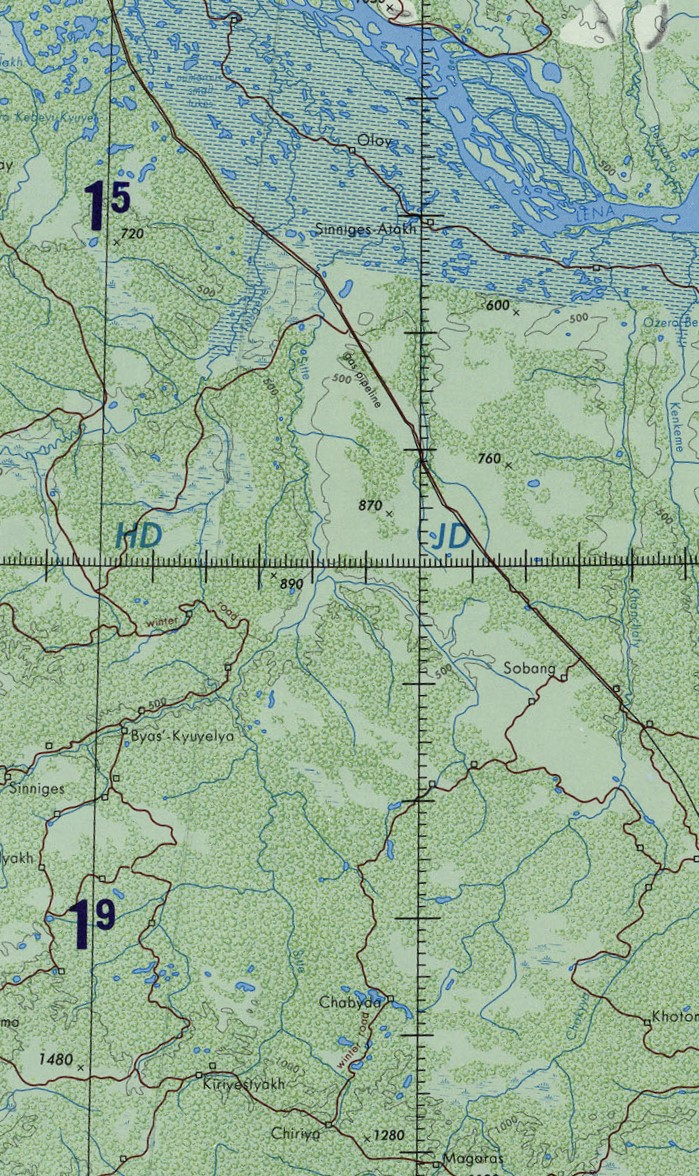
- ONC map section with the course of the Khanchaly on the right

- Mouth location in Yakutia, Russia

Location
- Country: Russia

Physical characteristics
- Source
  - coordinates: 62°19′11″N 128°06′31″E
  - elevation: 250 m (820 ft)
- Mouth: Lena
  - coordinates: 63°27′52″N 128°30′06″E
- Length: 241 km (150 mi)
- Basin size: 2,920 km^{2} (1,130 sq mi)

Basin features
- Progression: Lena→ Laptev Sea

The Khanchaly (Russian: Ханчалы; Yakut: Ханчылы, Xançılı) is a river in Yakutia (Sakha Republic), Russia. It is a left tributary of the Lena with a length of 241 kilometres (150 mi). Its drainage basin area is 2,920 square kilometres (1,130 mi^{2}).

The river flows across the Gorny, Namsky and Kobyaysky districts of Yakutia.

== Course ==
The entire length of the course of the Khanchaly falls within the Central Yakutian Lowland. Its source is in an area of lakes, the largest of which is lake Chabyda (Чабыда), a protected area located to the west of Yakutsk. The river flows first northeastwards, then it bends northwards, flowing parallel to the Kenkeme all along its middle and lower course. The Khanchaly heads steadily in a northern direction within poorly drained flatland until its mouth in the Lena. The confluence of the Khanchaly with the Lena is 1,260 kilometres (780 mi) from its mouth.

There are many small lakes in the Khanchaly basin, especially on the western side, to the east of the course of the Sitte. The river freezes between the second half of October and mid May.

=== Tributaries ===
The largest tributaries of the Khanchaly are the 22 km (14 mi) long Ulakhan-Khariyalaakh (Улахан-Харыйалаах), as well as the 29 km (18 mi) long Khotokukaan (Хотокукаан) from the left.

== See also ==
- List of rivers of Russia
