= Tyugyuene =

River in Yakutia (Sakha Republic), Russia

Tyugyuene Тюгюэне / Түгүөнэ
- Basin of the Lena

- Mouth location in Yakutia, Russia

Location
- Country: Russia

Physical characteristics
- Source
  - location: Confluence of Ysyakh-Yuryage and Kupsuyu-Yuryakh; Lena Plateau
  - coordinates: 62°24′36″N 125°39′31″E
  - elevation: 300 m (980 ft)
- Mouth: Lena
  - location: Near Kalvitsa
  - coordinates: 63°58′52″N 127°01′43″E
  - elevation: 59 m (194 ft)
- Length: 492 km (306 mi)
- Basin size: 8,740 km^{2} (3,370 sq mi)

Basin features
- Progression: Lena→ Laptev Sea

The Tyugyuene (Russian: Тюгюэне or Тюгене; Yakut: Түгүөнэ, Tügüöne) is a river in Yakutia (Sakha Republic), Russia. It is a tributary of the Lena with a length of 492 kilometres (306 mi) and a drainage basin area of 8,740 square kilometres (3,370 mi^{2}). The river marks the border between Gorny and Kobyaysky Districts in a stretch of its middle course.

The name of the river is based on the Evenk word "tagin" (тагин), meaning "swamp".

== Course ==
The Tyugyuene is a left tributary of the Lena. It has its origin at the confluence of the 13 km (8.1 mi) long Ysyakh-Yuryage and 7 km (4.3 mi) Kupsuyu-Yuryakh streams, at an altitude of about 300 m (980 ft) in the northeastern part of the Lena Plateau, southwest of the abandoned village of Abaranda. It heads first a roughly northern direction to the east of the Lungkha in its upper course, then it bends northeastwards in its middle course across the Central Yakutian Lowland, changing again to northwards. There are small lakes in the broad floodplain of the lower course of the river, and it meanders strongly before reaching the Lena floodplain, vast and filled with lakes, to the east of the Sitte. in some stretches the banks are high, with a cliff-like appearance. Finally it meets the Lena 1,162 kilometres (722 mi) from its mouth. Its confluence is at the Khatyng-Tumusakh arm, by the village of Khaptagay, near Sangar on the facing bank.

The A331 highway has a bridge over the Tyugyuene and a gas pipeline crosses the river about 111 km (69 mi) upstream from its mouth.

=== Tributaries ===
The Tyugyuene has thirty-eight tributaries that are over 10 km (6.2 mi) in length. The largest ones are the 78 kilometres (48 mi) long Chyuyolu from the right and the 71 kilometres (44 mi) long Olom and 71 kilometres (44 mi) long Lamlara from the left. The river freezes between mid October and the first half of May. In some stretches it freezes to the bottom.

== Flora and fauna ==
The vegetation of the Tyunyuene basin is mainly spruce and larch taiga, dense in some stretches of the upper course. In the floodplain the coniferous forest gives way to birch and willow thickets. Since there is little human presence in the area, Eurasian eagle-owl, elk, forest reindeer, roe deer, wolf, hare, sable and muskrat are common in the river basin.

== See also ==
- List of rivers of Russia
- Reindeer in Russia
