= Kenkeme =

River in Yakutia (Sakha Republic), Russia

Kenkeme Кенкеме / Кэҥкэмэ
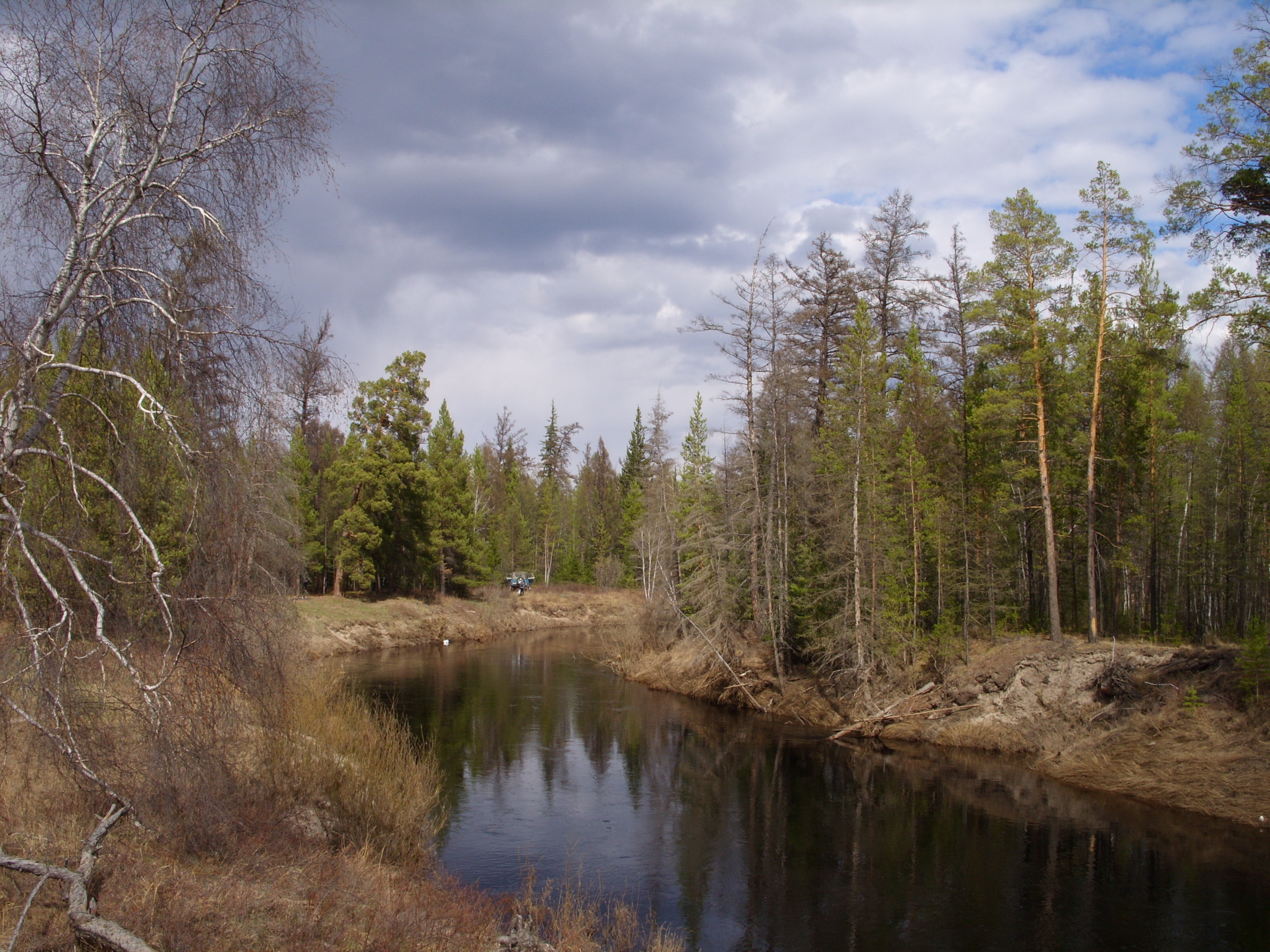
- View of the Kenkeme in its middle course near the A331 highway bridge.

- Mouth location in Yakutia, Russia

Location
- Country: Russia

Physical characteristics
- Source
  - location: Confluence of the Yagas-Yyaabyt and Yolyong-Yurege. Lena Plateau
  - coordinates: 61°59′44″N 127°19′02″E
  - elevation: 260 m (850 ft)
- Mouth: Lena
  - coordinates: 63°28′17″N 128°47′13″E
  - elevation: 68 m (223 ft)
- Length: 589 km (366 mi)
- Basin size: 10,000 km^{2} (3,900 sq mi)
- Discharge
  - average: 1.57 m^{3}/s (55 cu ft/s)

Basin features
- Progression: Lena→ Laptev Sea

The Kenkeme (Russian: Кенкеме; Yakut: Кэҥкэмэ, Keŋkeme) is a river in Yakutia (Sakha Republic), Russia. It is a tributary of the Lena with a length of 589 kilometres (366 mi) —627 kilometres (390 mi) together with the Yagas-Yyaabyt at its head— and a drainage basin area of 10,000 square kilometres (3,900 mi^{2}).

The Mirny — Yakutsk stretch of the A331 highway has a bridge over the Kenkeme. The river flows across a desolate region. The only inhabited place in its basin is an Evenk settlement in the middle course. Since it is not far from Yakutsk, the Kenkeme is a popular summer destination for kayaking and rafting.

== Course ==
The Kenkeme originates in the northeastern edge of the Lena Plateau, at the confluence of the Yagas-Yyaabyt (Ыагас-Ыйаабыт) and Yolyong-Yurege (Ёлёнг-Юрэгэ) rivers. Is sources are about 125 km (78 mi) to the west of Yakutsk in a straight line. It heads first in a southeastern direction, bending to the east and then to the north, forming meanders in the floodplain and flowing across the Central Yakutian Lowland parallel to the Khanchaly to the west and the Lena to the east. Finally it joins the left bank of the Lena 1,275 kilometres (792 mi) from its mouth, shortly after the great river makes a big bend to the west; east of the mouth of the Aldan and nearly opposite of the mouth of the Belyanka in the facing bank.

The Kenkeme has a large river basin which includes parts of the Gorny District, Khangalassky District, Yakutsk Urban District, Namsky District and Kobyaysky District.

The river is fed by snow and rain. Between November and May it freezes to the bottom. The largest tributaries of the Kenkeme are the 59 km (37 mi) long Chukul, as well as the Delaiah and the Chakyya from the left.

Basin of the Lena

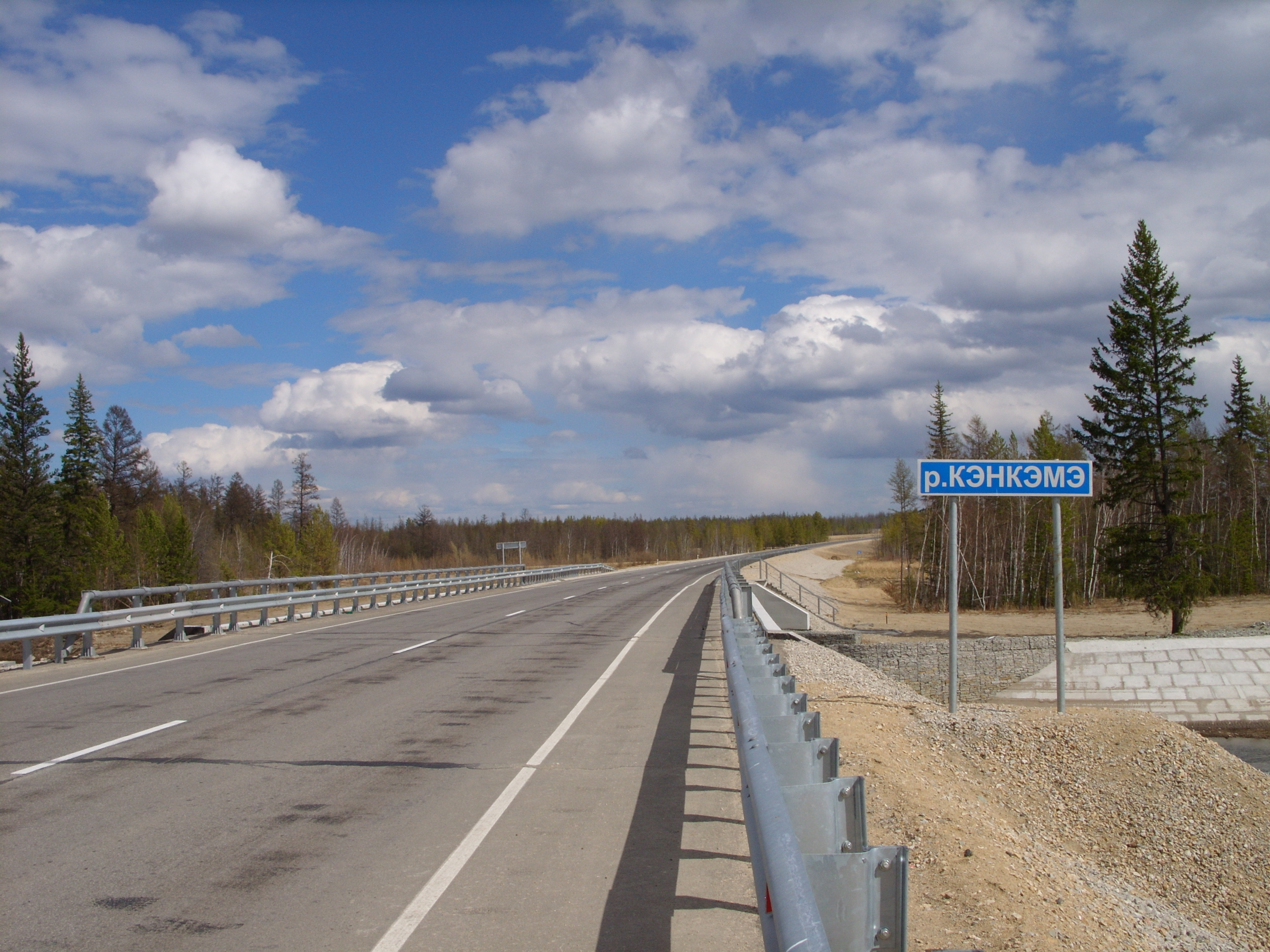
A331 highway bridge over the Kenkeme.

== Flora and fauna ==
The vegetation of the river basin consists of lightly spread coniferous forests, where the main tree species is larch. There is continuous permafrost in the region.

Ide, dace, pike, roach and grayling are the main fish species found in the waters of the Kenkeme.

== See also ==
- List of rivers of Russia
