= Chagda, Kobyaysky District, Sakha Republic =

Chagda Чагда
- Selo
- Location of Chagda
- Location of Chagda Chagda (Sakha Republic)
- Coordinates: 63°22′N 125°31′E
- Country: Russia
- Federal subject: Sakha Republic
- Administrative district: Kobyaysky District
- Rural okrug: Nizhilinsky Rural Okrug

Population (2010 Census)
  - Total: 542

Administrative status
  - Capital of: Nizhilinsky Rural Okrug

Municipal status
  - Municipal district: Kobyaysky Municipal District
  - Rural settlement: Nizhilinsky Rural Settlement
  - Capital of: Nizhilinsky Rural Settlement
- Time zone: UTC+9 (MSK+6)
- Postal code(s): 678315
- OKTMO ID: 98624445101

Chagda (Russian: Чагда; Yakut: Чагда, Çagda) is a rural locality (a selo), the only inhabited locality, and the administrative center of Nizhilinsky Rural Okrug of Kobyaysky District in the Sakha Republic, Russia, 180 kilometers (110 mi) from Sangar, the administrative center of the district. Its population as of the 2010 Census was 542, up from 497 recorded during the 2002 Census.
