= Smorodichny =

Smorodichny Смородичный
- Selo
- Location of Smorodichny
- Location of Smorodichny Smorodichny (Sakha Republic)
- Coordinates: 63°54′N 127°31′E
- Country: Russia
- Federal subject: Sakha Republic
- Administrative district: Kobyaysky District
- Settlement: Settlement of Sangar

Population
  - Estimate (2002): 0

Municipal status
  - Municipal district: Kobyaysky Municipal District
  - Rural settlement: Sangar Urban Settlement
- Time zone: UTC+9 (MSK+6)
- Postal code(s): 678300
- OKTMO ID: 98624151111

Smorodichny (Russian: Смородичный) is a rural locality (a selo) under the administrative jurisdiction of the Settlement of Sangar in Kobyaysky District of the Sakha Republic, Russia, located 5 kilometers (3.1 mi) from Sangar proper. It had no recorded population as of the 2002 Census.
