= Linde (Lena) =

River in Russia

- Mouth location in Sakha, Russia

Location
- Country: Russia

Physical characteristics
- Mouth: Lena
  - coordinates: 64.9667°N 124.6031°E
- Length: 804 km (500 mi)
- Basin size: 20,000 km^{2} (7,700 sq mi)

Basin features
- Progression: Lena→ Laptev Sea

The Linde (Russian: Линде; Yakut: Лииндэ, Liinde) is a river in Sakha Republic, Russia. It is a left tributary of the Lena. It is 804 kilometres (500 mi) long, and has a drainage basin of 20,000 square kilometres (7,700 sq mi).

Basin of the Lena

== See also ==
- List of rivers of Russia
- Central Yakutian Lowland
- Tukulan
