= Kobyay =

Kobyay Кобяй
- Selo

Other transcription(s)
  - Yakut: Кэбээйи
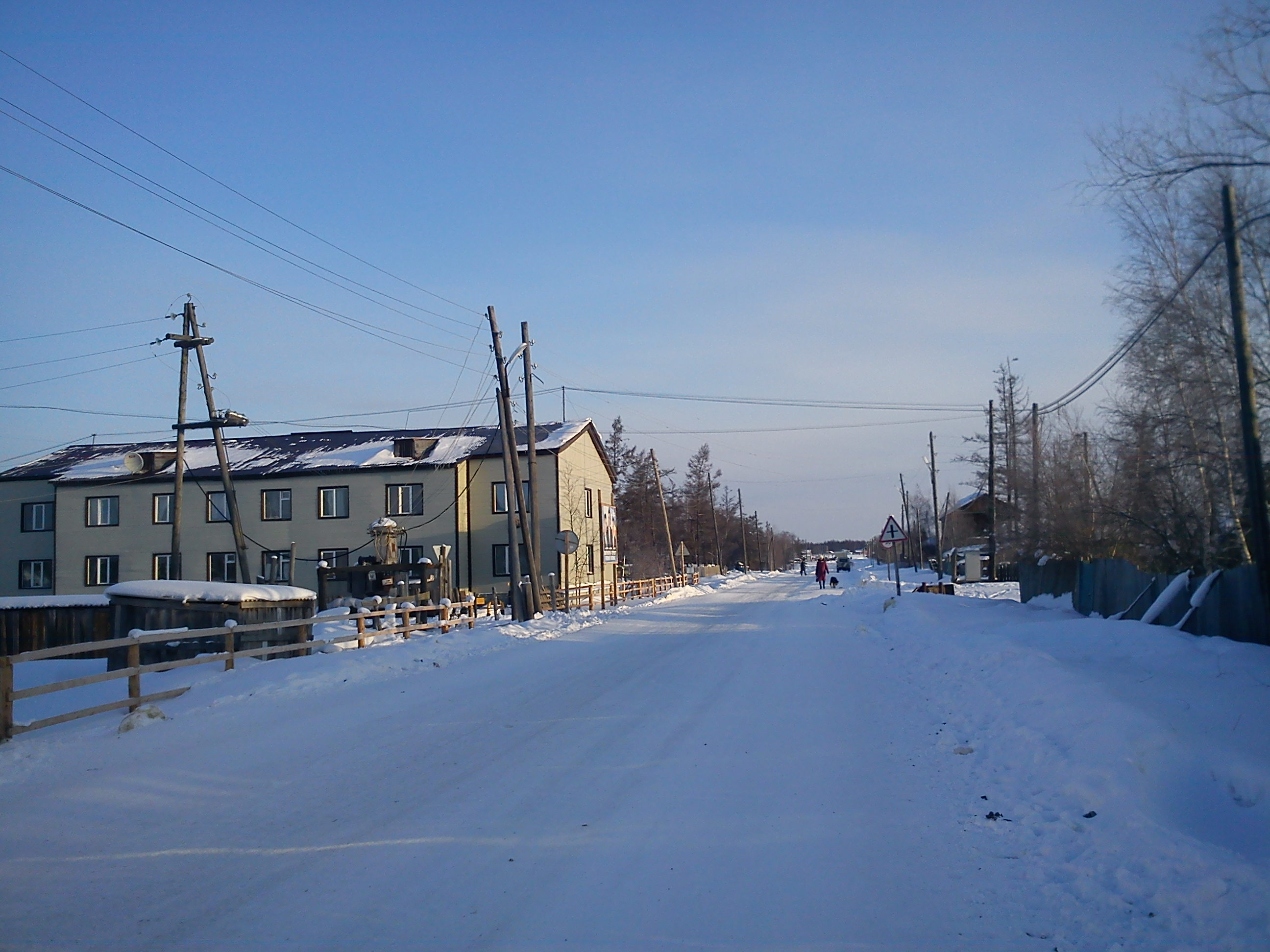
- A street in Kobyay
- Interactive map of Kobyay
- Location of Kobyay Kobyay (Sakha Republic)
- Coordinates: 63°34′42″N 126°31′50″E
- Country: Russia
- Federal subject: Sakha Republic
- Administrative district: Kobyaysky District
- Rural okrugSelsoviet: Kobyaysky Rural Okrug

Population
  - Estimate (2002): 2,570 )

Administrative status
  - Capital of: Kobyaysky Rural Okrug

Municipal status
  - Municipal district: Kobyaysky Municipal District
  - Rural settlement: Kobyaysky Rural Settlement
  - Capital of: Kobyaysky Rural Settlement
- Time zone: UTC+
- Postal code: 678310
- OKTMO ID: 98624419101

Kobyay (Russian: Кобяй; Yakut: Кэбээйи, romanized: Kebeeyi) is a rural locality (a selo) and the administrative center of Kobyaysky Rural Okrug of Kobyaysky District in the Sakha Republic, Russia, located 120 kilometers (75 mi) from Sangar, the administrative center of the district. and 260 kilometers (160 mi) north west of Yakutsk, the capital of the Republic Its population as of the 2002 Census was 2,570.
