= Tabaga =

Tabaga (Russian: Табага) is the name of several rural localities in the Sakha Republic, Russia:

- Tabaga, Yakutsk, Sakha Republic, a selo under the administrative jurisdiction of the city of republic significance of Yakutsk
- Tabaga, Megino-Kangalassky District, Sakha Republic, a selo in Taragaysky Rural Okrug of Megino-Kangalassky District
