= Mastakh =

Mastakh Мастах
- Selo
- Interactive map of Mastakh
- Location of Mastakh Mastakh (Sakha Republic)
- Coordinates: 63°43′22″N 124°11′22″E
- Country: Russia
- Federal subject: Sakha Republic
- Administrative district: Kobyaysky District
- Rural okrugSelsoviet: Lyuchcheginsky 2-y Rural Okrug

Population (2010 Census)
  - Total: 617
  - Estimate (2021): 465 (−24.6%)

Administrative status
  - Capital of: Lyuchcheginsky 2-y Rural Okrug

Municipal status
  - Municipal district: Kobyaysky Municipal District
  - Rural settlement: Lyuchcheginsky 2-y Rural Settlement
  - Capital of: Lyuchcheginsky 2-y Rural Settlement
- Time zone: UTC+
- Postal code: 678313
- OKTMO ID: 98624435101

Mastakh (Russian: Мастах; Yakut: Мастаах, Mastaax) is a rural locality (a selo) and the administrative center of Lyuchcheginsky 2-y Rural Okrug of Kobyaysky District in the Sakha Republic, Russia, located 285 kilometers (177 mi) from Sangar, the administrative center of the district. Its population as of the 2010 Census was 617; up from 577 recorded in the 2002 Census.
