= Tukulan =

Land forms in Yakutia, Russian Federation

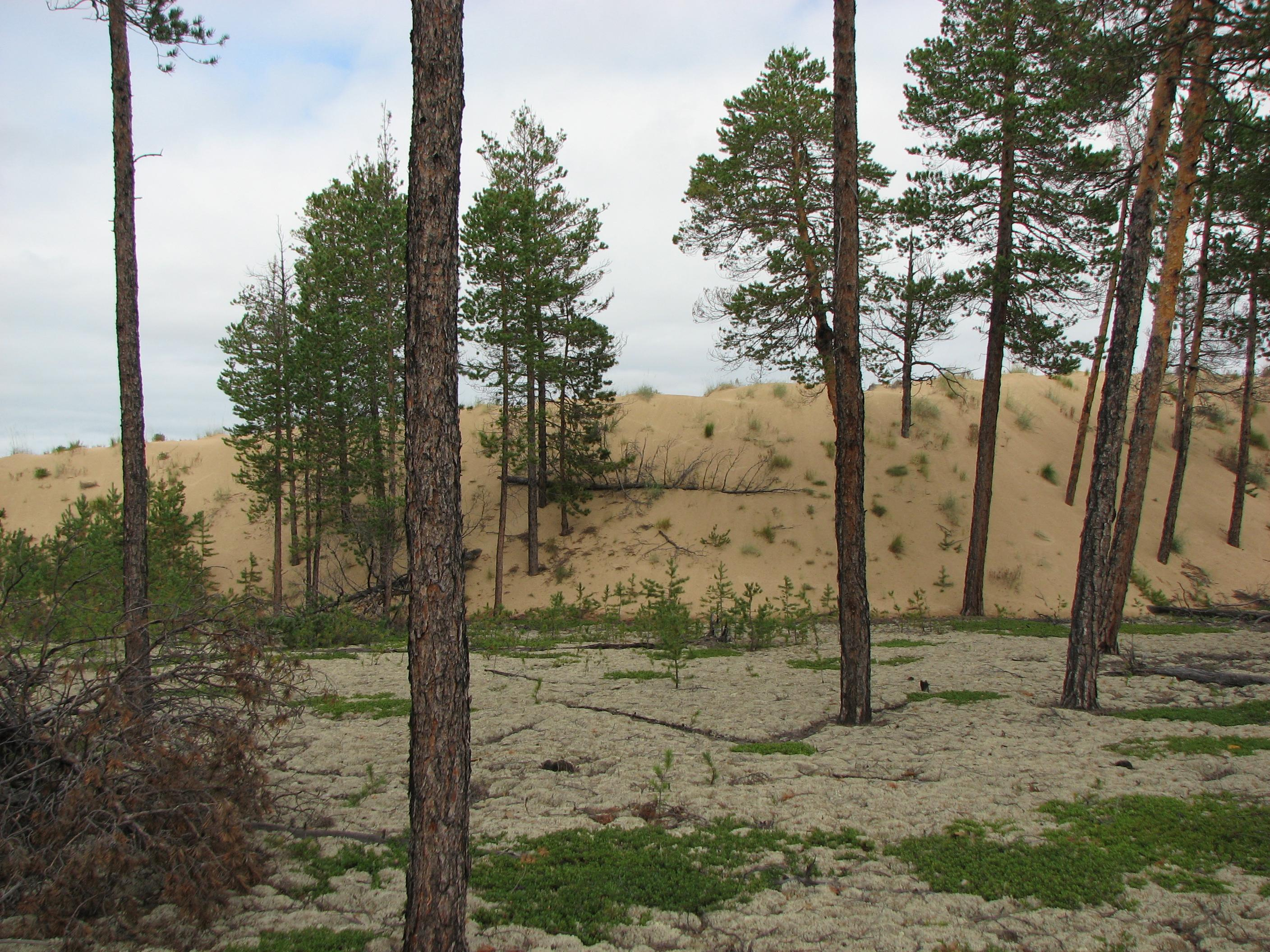
Tukulan. Close view.

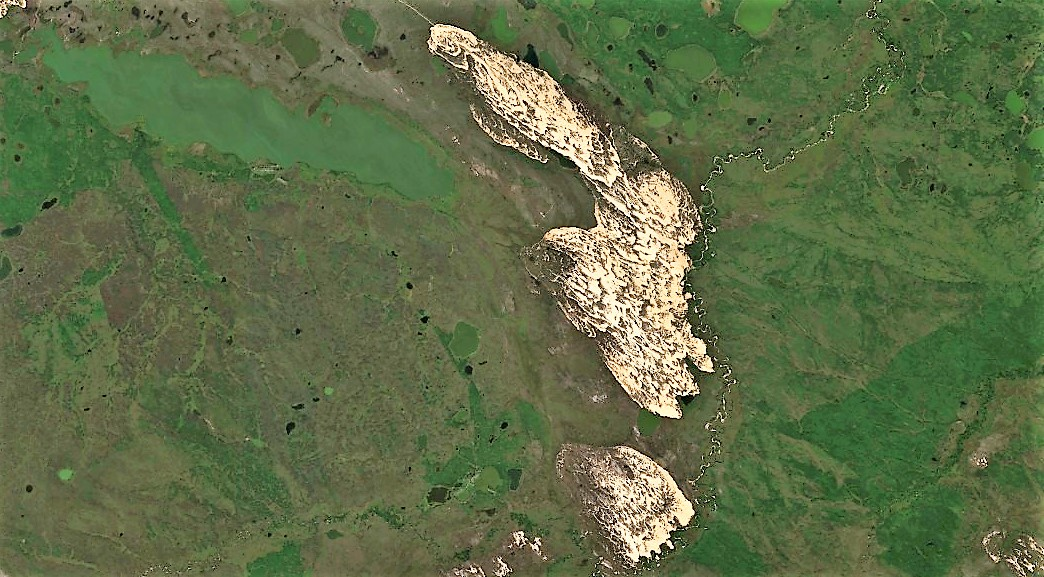
Tukulan land forms close to river Lungkha seen from space.

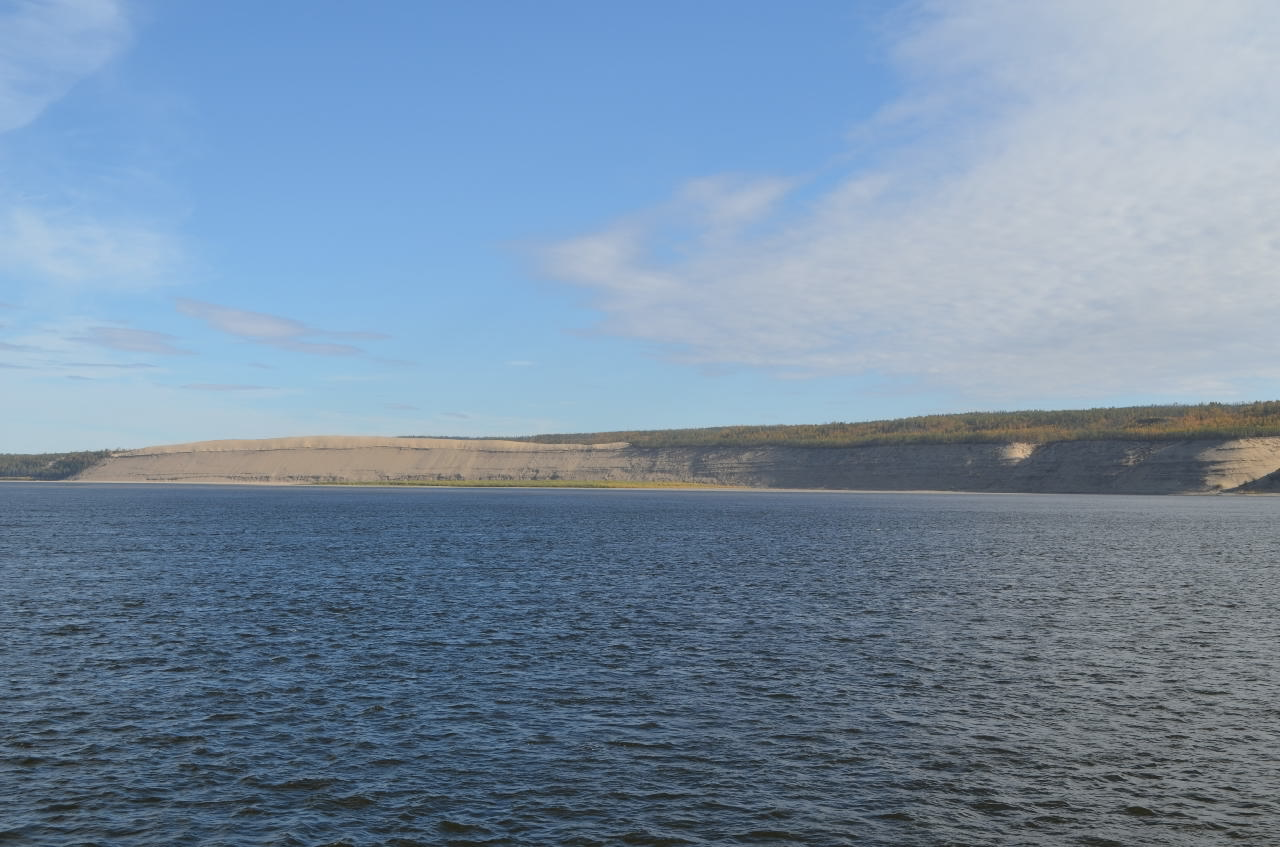
Tukulan by the Lena.

Tukulans (Russian: Тукуланы; Yakut: Тукулаан, a term from Evenki origin) are relief forms shaped by aeolian processes of the Central Yakutian Lowland, Yakutia, Russian Federation. They are sand dunes of a characteristic type mainly found along the valley of the Lena River, in the area of the lower Vilyuy river.

Tukulans come in the form of isolated dunes, but also as large sand-covered areas in certain spots of the plain, often among the trees of the taiga. The largest of the dunes lies at 65°08′01.6″N 122°58′00.7″E near the Linde River and reaches almost 40 kilometres (25 mi) in length.

== History ==
Tukulans were first described in 1927 by pioneering researcher Sergei Kuznetsov during an expedition surveying Yakutia sent by the government of the USSR. Kuzntesov published a paper calling attention on them. A few years later academicians Andrei Grigoryev of the Academy of Sciences of the Soviet Union and Tikhon Rabotnov of Moscow State University continued the study of these landforms, but they were faced with the problem that they lie in a remote area of difficult access. Finally in the 1940s aerial photography surveys were carried out and all tukulan areas were identified and included in the cartography of the region.

== See also ==
- Aeolian landform
