= Sitte (river) =

River in Yakutia (Sakha Republic), Russia

Sitte Ситте / Сииттэ
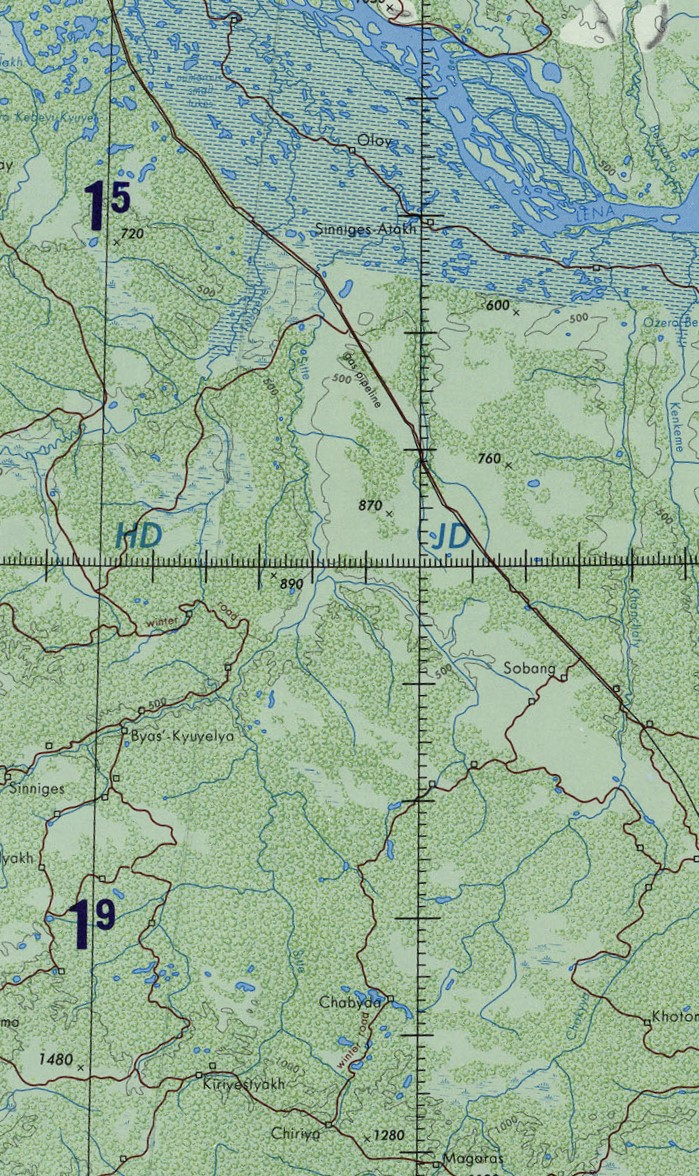
- Course of the Sitte map section with the Lena on top

- Mouth location in Yakutia, Russia

Location
- Country: Russia

Physical characteristics
- Source
  - location: Lena Plateau
  - coordinates: 62°16′12″N 127°14′36″E
  - elevation: 250 m (820 ft)
- Mouth: Lena
  - location: Balagannakh
  - coordinates: 63°52′35″N 127°15′14″E
  - elevation: 121 m (397 ft)
- Length: 431 km (268 mi)
- Basin size: 8,250 km^{2} (3,190 sq mi)
- Discharge
  - average: 28.6 m^{3}/s (1,010 cu ft/s)

Basin features
- Progression: Lena→ Laptev Sea

The Sitte (Russian: Ситте; Yakut: Сииттэ, Siitte) is a river in Yakutia (Sakha Republic), Russia. It is a left tributary of the Lena with a length of 431 kilometres (268 mi). Its drainage basin area is 8,250 square kilometres (3,190 mi^{2}).

The name of the river is based on the Yakut word "satyy" (сатыы), meaning "low".

== Course ==
The Sitte has its sources in a marshy area near Kiriyestyakh, at the northern edge of the Lena Plateau. It soon leaves the plateau area and flows across the Central Yakutian Lowland in a roughly northern direction. The river forms meanders as it heads north within a floodplain with oxbows and small thermokarst lakes to the east of the Tyugyuene and west of the Khanchaly. Close to the final stretch of its course the Sitte enters the Lena floodplain, dotted with a multitude of larger lakes and marshes. Finally it meets an arm of the left bank of the Lena, 1,157 kilometres (719 mi) from its mouth.

The Sitte river is fed by rain and snow. Floods are common in the spring, but the rest of the warm season its channel is shallow and it may dry in stretches. Parts of the upper course are often encumbered by logs and fallen trees.

The river basin is largely uninhabited territory, except for Bes-Kyuyel, a small Yakut settlement. There is a gas pipeline that crosses the Sitte about 1 km (0.62 mi) from the border between Gorny and Kobyaysky Districts.

=== Tributaries ===
The Sitte has eighteen tributaries that are over 10 km (6.2 mi) in length. The largest one is the 108 km (67 mi) long Dyuktyuene (Yakut: Дьүктүөнэ) from the left. The river freezes between the second half of October and mid May.

== Flora and fauna ==
The vegetation of the Sitte basin is mainly spruce and larch taiga. There are also birch forests in some areas of the Sitte's lower course. The basin is prone to forest fires in some years.

The main fish species are pike, perch and common roach, among others. Elk, wild reindeer, roe deer, wolf, hare, sable, muskrat and many other animals are common in the Tugyuene basin.

== See also ==
- List of rivers of Russia
