= Aryktakh =

Aryktakh Арыктах
- Selo
- Interactive map of Aryktakh
- Location of Aryktakh Aryktakh (Sakha Republic)
- Coordinates: 63°34′N 125°15′E
- Country: Russia
- Federal subject: Sakha Republic
- Administrative district: Kobyaysky District
- Rural okrugSelsoviet: Aryktakhsky Rural Okrug

Population (2010 Census)
  - Total: 286
  - Estimate (2021): 342 (+19.6%)

Administrative status
  - Capital of: Aryktakhsky Rural Okrug

Municipal status
  - Municipal district: Kobyaysky Municipal District
  - Rural settlement: Aryktakhsky Rural Settlement
  - Capital of: Aryktakhsky Rural Settlement
- Time zone: UTC+
- Postal code: 678316
- OKTMO ID: 98624405101

Aryktakh (Russian: Арыктах; Yakut: Арыктаах, Arıktaax) is a rural locality (a selo) and the administrative center of Aryktakhsky Rural Okrug of Kobyaysky District in the Sakha Republic, Russia, located 215 kilometers (134 mi) from Sangar, the administrative center of the district. Its population as of the 2010 Census was 286; up from 275 recorded in the 2002 Census.
