= Lena River =

River in Russia

Lena
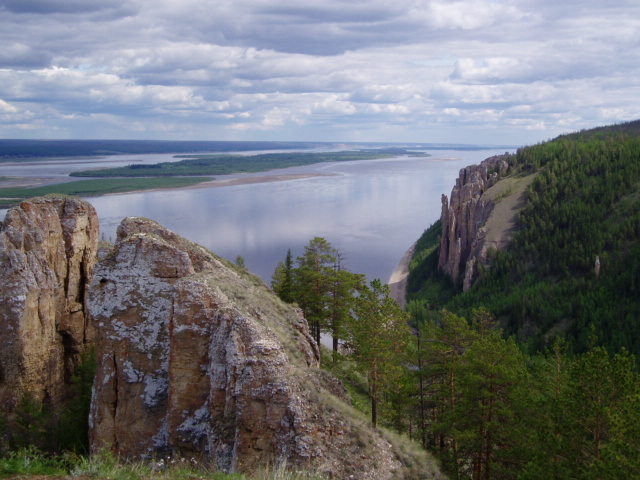
- The Lena Pillars along the river near Yakutsk

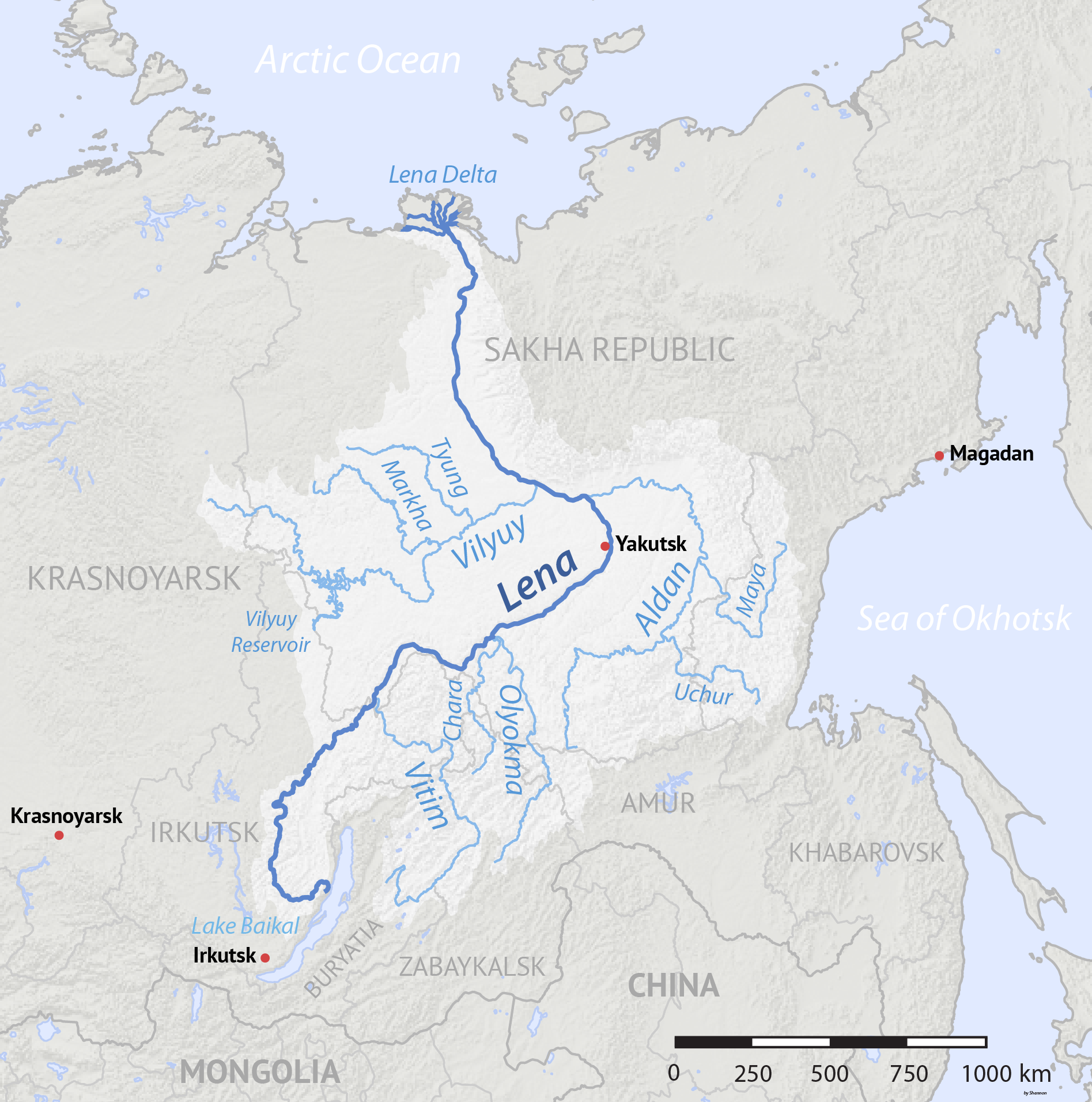
- Lena watershed
- Native name: Лена (Russian); Өлүөнэ (Yakut); Елюенэ (Evenki); Зүлхэ (Buryat); Зүлгэ (Mongolian)

Location
- Country: Russia

Physical characteristics
- Source: Baikal Mountains
  - location: Kachugsky District, Irkutsk Oblast
  - coordinates: 53°59′40″N 107°52′33″E (approximately)
  - elevation: 1,640 m (5,380 ft)
- Mouth: Lena Delta
  - location: Arctic Ocean, Laptev Sea
  - coordinates: 72.4087°N 126.6847°E
  - elevation: 0 m (0 ft)
- Length: 4,294 km (2,668 mi)
- Basin size: 2,460,742 km^{2} (950,098 mi^{2}) to 2,490,000 km^{2} (960,000 mi^{2})
- Width
  - maximum: 10,000 m (33,000 ft)
- Depth
  - maximum: 28 m (92 ft)
- Discharge
  - location: Kyusyur, Russia Basin size: 2,440,000 km^{2} (940,000 sq mi) to 2,418,974 km^{2} (933,971 sq mi)
  - average: (Period of data: 1971–2015)17,773 m^{3}/s (627,600 cu ft/s) (Period of data: 1970–1999)17,067 m^{3}/s (602,700 cu ft/s) 15,500 m^{3}/s (550,000 cu ft/s)
  - minimum: 366 m^{3}/s (12,900 cu ft/s)
  - maximum: 241,000 m^{3}/s (8,500,000 cu ft/s) Lena Delta, Laptev Sea, Russia (Period of data: 1984–2018)577 km^{3}/a (18,300 m^{3}/s) (Period of data: 1940–2019) 545.7 km^{3}/a (17,290 m^{3}/s)
- Discharge
  - location: Vilyuy
  - average: 12,100 m^{3}/s (430,000 cu ft/s) Tabaga, Yakutsk (Basin size: 987,000 km^{2} (381,000 mi^{2}) (Period of data: 1967–2017) 7,453.2 m^{3}/s (263,210 cu ft/s) (max. 51,600 m^{3}/s (1,820,000 cu ft/s))
- Discharge
  - location: Olyokminsk
  - average: 4,500 m^{3}/s (160,000 cu ft/s)
- Discharge
  - location: Vitim
  - average: 1,700 m^{3}/s (60,000 cu ft/s)
- Discharge
  - location: Kirensk
  - average: 480 m^{3}/s (17,000 cu ft/s)

Basin features
- Tributaries
  - left: Vilyuy
  - right: Kirenga, Vitim, Olyokma, Aldan

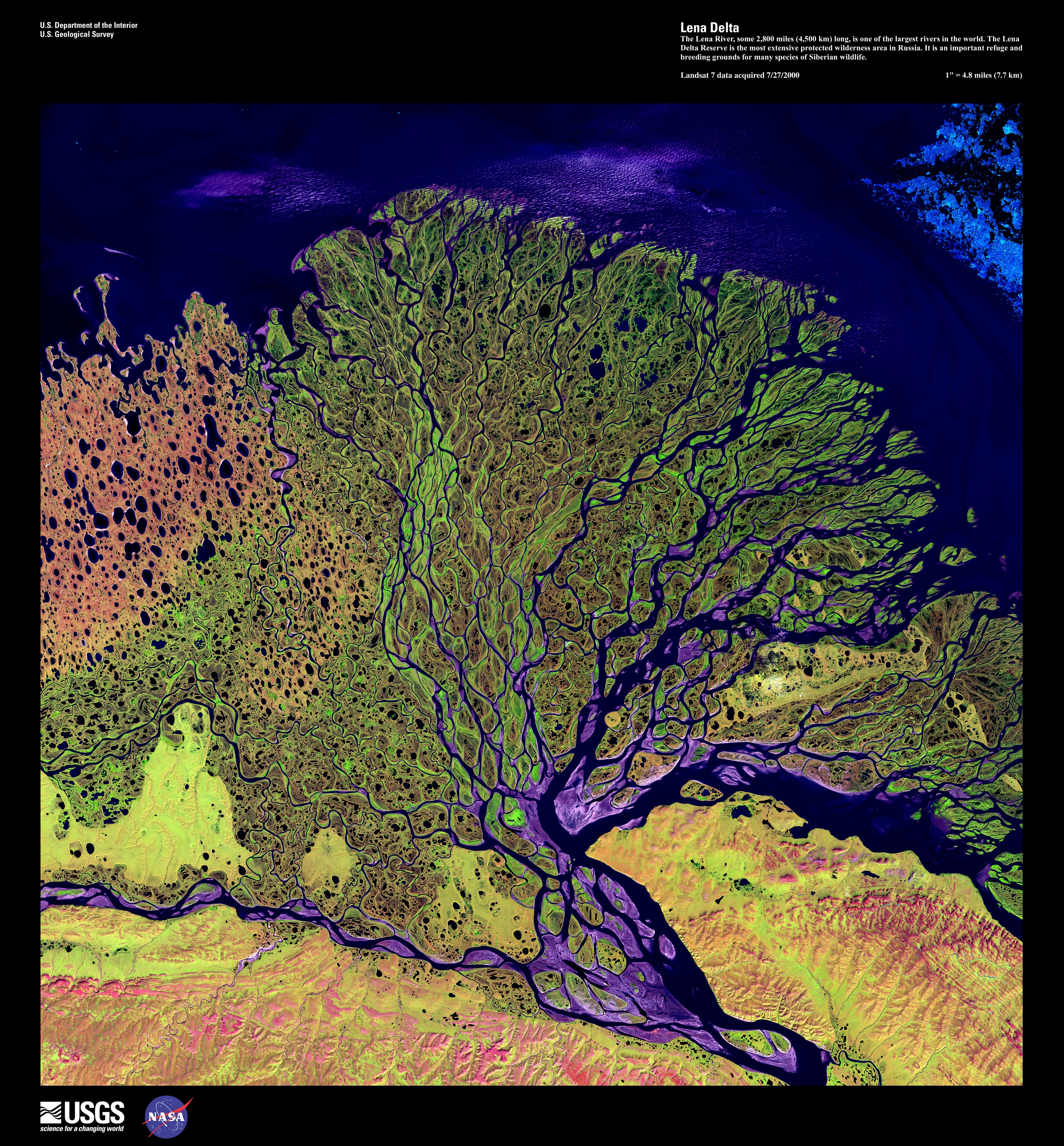
Lena River Delta

The Lena (Note: Russian: Ле́на, IPA: [ˈlʲɛnə]; Evenki: Елюенэ, Eljujene; Yakut: Өлүөнэ, Ölüöne; Buryat: Зүлхэ, Zülkhe; Mongolian: Зүлгэ, Zülge) is a river in the Russian Far East and is the easternmost river of the three great rivers of Siberia which flow into the Arctic Ocean, the others being Ob and Yenisey. The Lena River is 4,294 km (2,668 mi) long and has a capacious drainage basin of 2,490,000 km^{2} (960,000 mi^{2}); thus the Lena is the eleventh-longest river in the world and the longest river entirely within Russia. Geographically, permafrost underlies all the Lena River's catchment basin, and it is continuous in over 75 percent of it.

== Course ==
The Lena originates at 1,640 meters (5,381 ft) of elevation in the Baikal Mountains, 7 kilometres (4 mi) west of Lake Baikal, south of the Central Siberian Plateau, flowing from a small swamp 15 km from the Sunfall Pass. The Lena flows north-east and traverses the Lena-Angara Plateau, then is joined by three tributary rivers: (i) the Kirenga, (ii) the Vitim, and (iii) the Olyokma. From Yakutsk, the Lena River enters the Central Yakutian Lowland and flows north until joined by the eastern tributary, the Aldan River, and the western tributary, the Vilyuy River. Afterwards, the Lena bends westwards and northwards, flowing between the mountains of the Kharaulakh Range to the east (part of the Verkhoyansk Range) and the mountains of the Chekanovsky Ridge to the west. Travelling approximately due north, the Lena widens into a great river delta that merges into the Laptev Sea, a marginal region of the Arctic Ocean, south-west of the New Siberian Islands. The Lena Delta is 30,000 square kilometres (12,000 sq mi) in area, being traversed by seven main branches, the most important being the Bykovsky channel, farthest east.

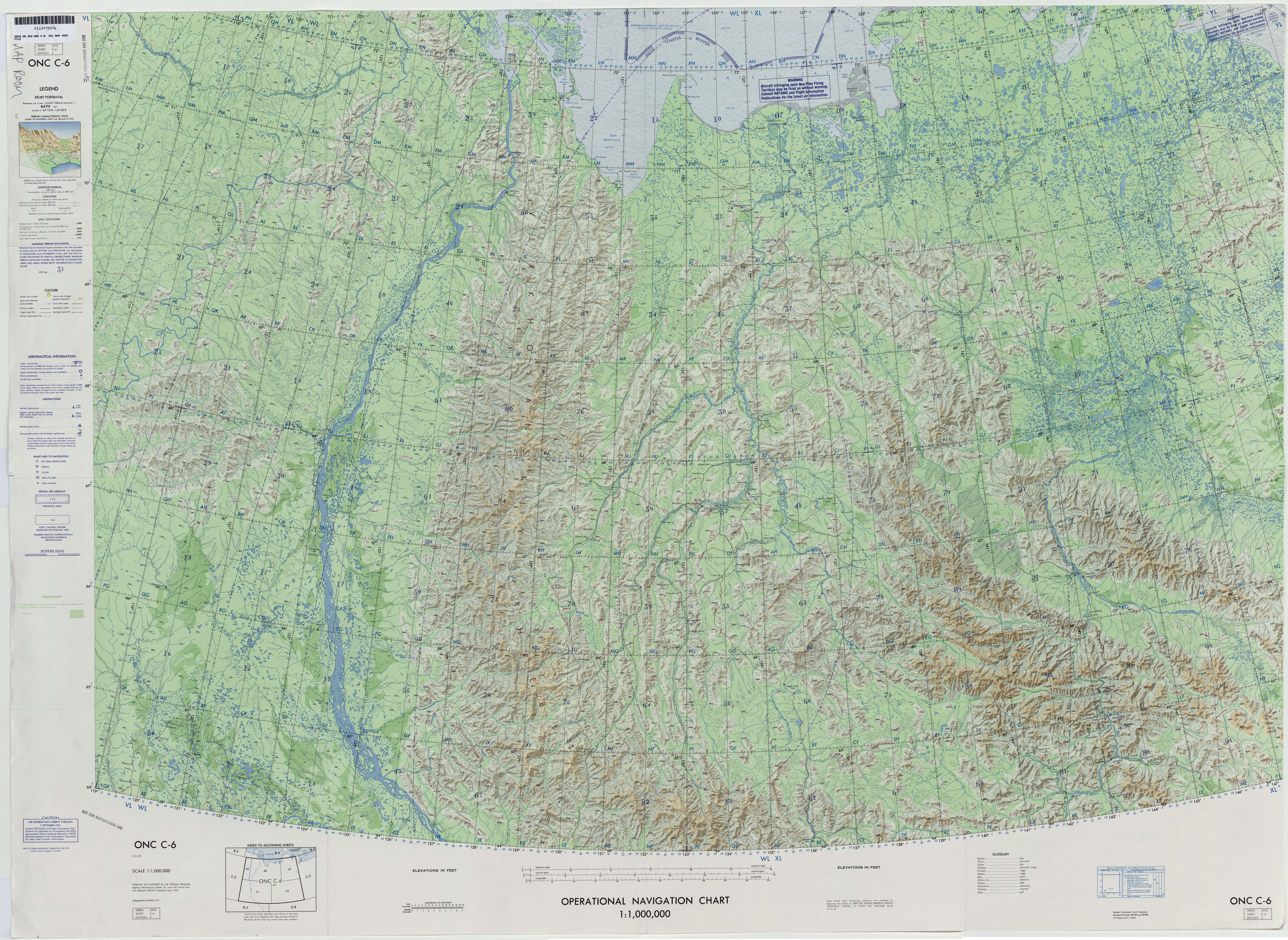
The lower course of the Lena River in Siberia.

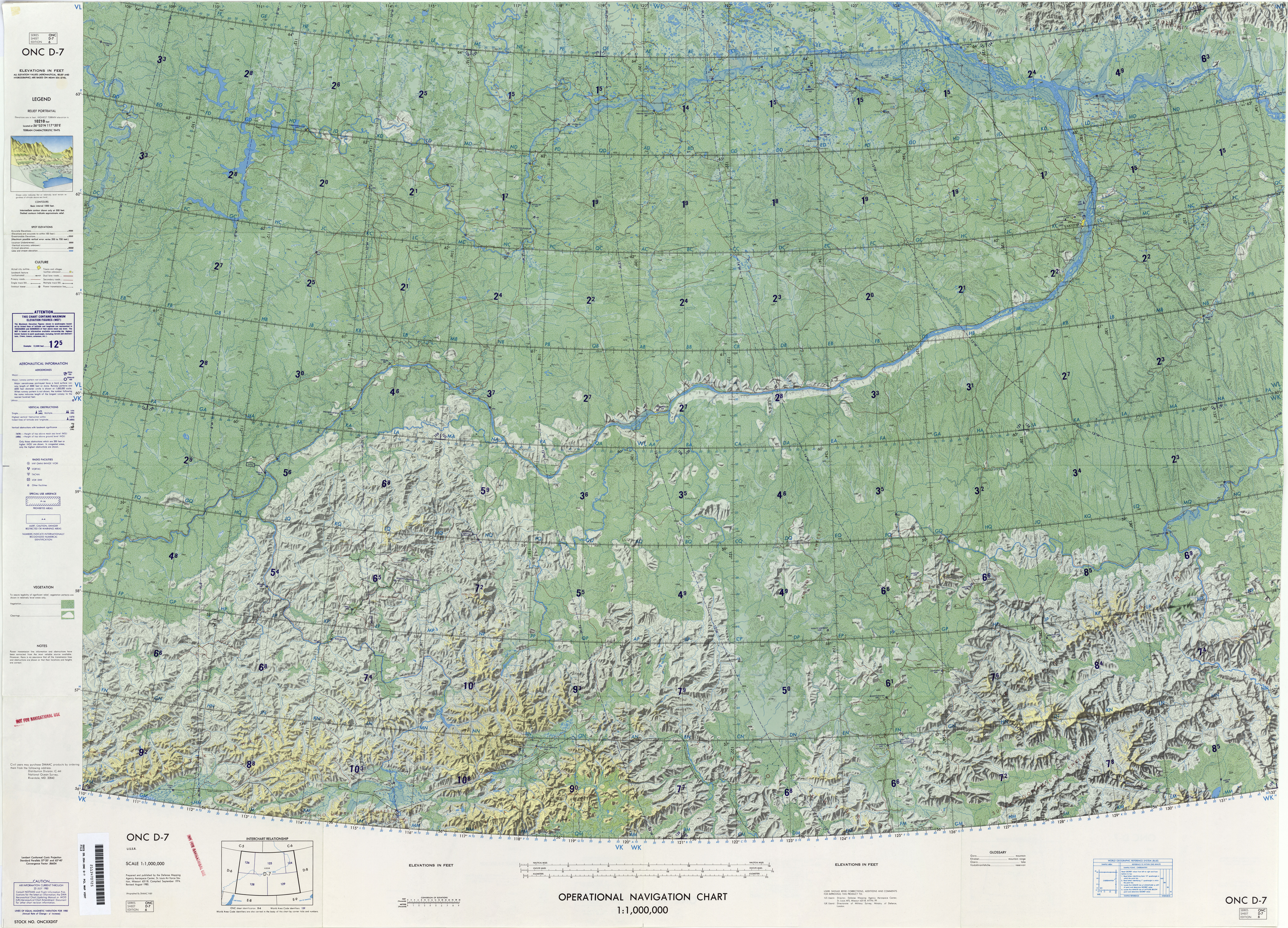
The upper course of the Lena River in Siberia.

The Lena is navigable over a length of 3540 kilometres. The annual navigation period, when ice is minimally present or absent, lasts about 70 days in the estuarine region and 125 days elsewhere.

== Basin ==
The area of the Lena River basin is calculated at 2,490,000 square kilometres (960,000 sq mi) and the mean annual discharge is 489 cubic kilometers per year. Gold is washed out of the sands of the Vitim and the Olyokma, and mammoth tusks have been dug out of the delta. There are numerous lakes in the floodplain of the river. Lakes Nedzheli and Ulakhan-Kyuel are the largest in the basin of the Lena.

=== Tributaries ===
The Kirenga flows north between the upper Lena River and Lake Baikal. The Vitim drains the area northeast of Lake Baikal. The Olyokma flows north. The Amga makes a long curve southeast and parallel to the Lena and flows into the Aldan. The Aldan also curves roughly parallel to the Lena until it turns east and flows into the Lena north of Yakutsk. The Maya, a tributary of the Aldan, drains an area almost to the Sea of Okhotsk. The T-shaped Chona-Vilyuy system drains most of the area to the west.

The main tributaries of the Lena are, from source to mouth:

- Tutura (right)
- Ilga (left)
- Kuta (left)
- Tayura (right)
- Kirenga (right)
- Pilyuda (left)
- Chechuy (right)
- Ichera (left)
- Chaya (right)
- Chuya (right)
- Vitim (right)
- Peleduy (left)
- Nyuya (left)
- Derba (left)
- Ura (left)
- Bolshoy Patom (right)
- Cherendey (left)
- Biryuk (left)
- Olyokma (right)
  - Chara
- Markha (left)
- Markhachan (left)
- Tuolba (right)
- Sinyaya (left)
- Buotama (right)
- Menda (right)
- Myla (right)
- Tamma (right)
- Lyutenge (right)
- Suola (right)
- Aldan (right)
- Batamay (right)
- Belyanka (right)
  - Munni
- Lyapiske (right)
- Tympylykan (left)
- Dyanyshka (right)
- Tyugyuene (left)
- Sitte (left)
- Khanchaly (left)
- Kenkeme (left)
- Lungkha (left)
- Namana (left)
- Vilyuy (left)
  - Chona
- Linde (left)
- Undyulyung (right)
- Nuora (left)
- Begidyan (right)
- Khoruongka (left)
- Sobolokh-Mayan (right)
- Kyuelenke (left)
- Muna (left)
- Menkere (right)
- Motorchuna (left)
- Molodo (left)
  - Syungyude
- Natara (right)
- Uel-Siktyakh (right)
- Kuranakh-Siktyakh (right)
- Byosyuke (right)
- Tikyan (right)
- Eyekit (left)
- Bulkur (left)

== History ==
It is commonly believed that the Lena derives its name from the original Even-Evenk name Elyu-Ene, which means "the Large River".

According to folktales related a century later, in the years 1620–1623 a party of Russian fur hunters under the leadership of Demid Pyanda sailed up Nizhnyaya Tunguska, discovered the Lena, and either carried their boats there or built new ones. In 1623 Pyanda explored some 2,400 kilometres (1,500 mi) of the river from its upper reaches to the central Yakutia. In 1628 Vasily Bugor and 10 men reached the Lena, collected 'yasak' (tribute) from the 'natives' and then founded Kirinsk in 1632. In 1631 the voyevoda of Yeniseysk sent Pyotr Beketov and 20 men to construct a fortress at Yakutsk (founded in 1632). From Yakutsk other expeditions spread out to the south and east. The Lena delta was reached in 1655.

Two of the three groups of survivors of the ill-fated Jeannette expedition reached Lena Delta in September, 1881. The one led by engineer George W. Melville was rescued by native Tungus huntsmen. Of the group led by Captain George W. De Long, only two of the men survived; the others died of starvation.

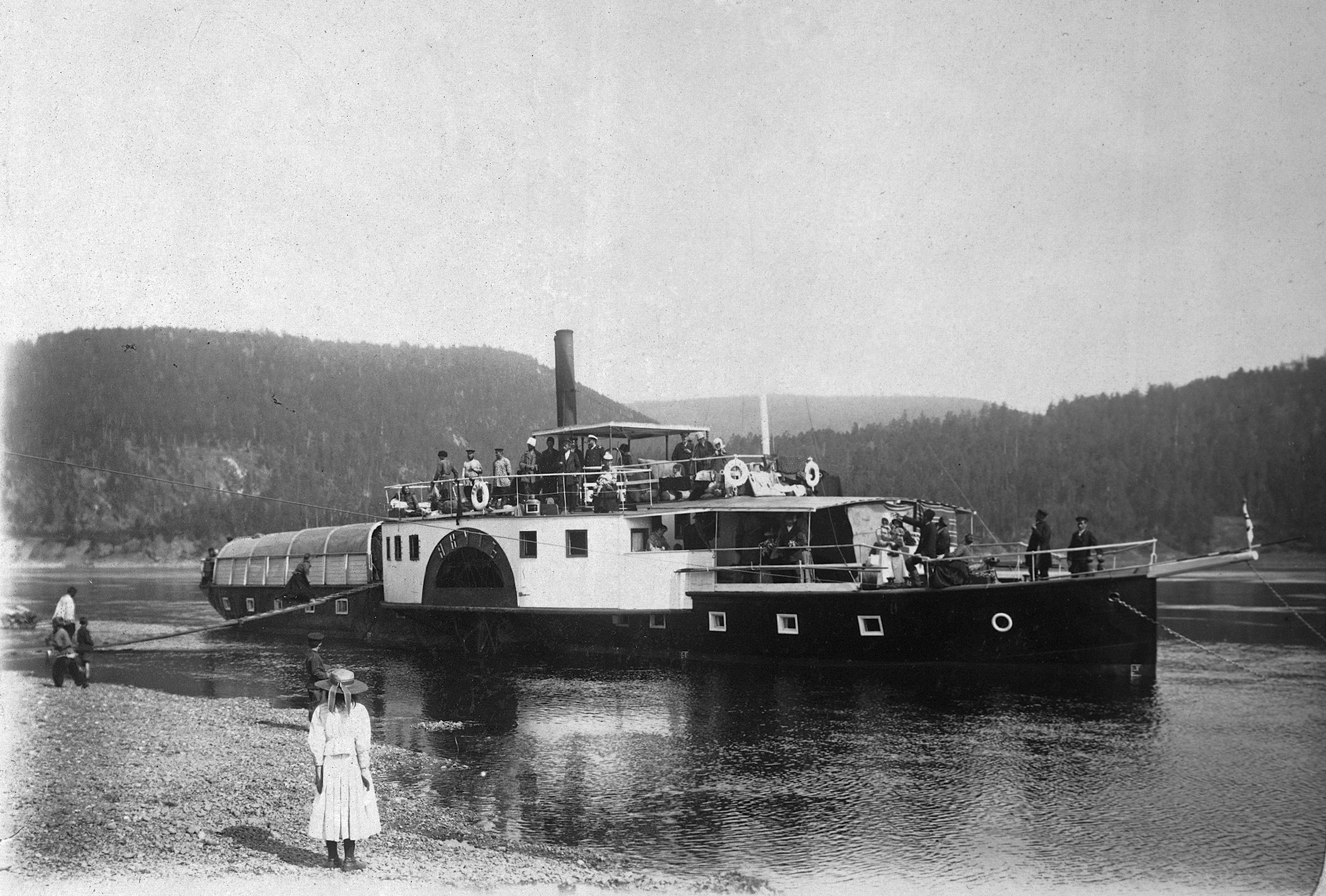
The river around 1890

Baron Eduard Von Toll, accompanied by Alexander von Bunge, led an expedition that explored the Lena delta and the islands of New Siberia on behalf of the Russian Imperial Academy of Sciences in 1885. In 1886 they investigated the New Siberian Islands and the Yana River and its tributaries. During one year and two days the expedition covered 25,000 kilometres (16,000 mi), of which 4,200 kilometres (2,600 mi) were up rivers, carrying out geodesic surveys en route.

The Lena massacre was the name given to the 1912 shooting-down of striking goldminers and local citizens who protested at the working conditions in the mine near Bodaybo in northern Irkutsk. The incident was reported in the Duma (parliament) by Kerensky and is credited with stimulating revolutionary feeling in Russia.

Vladimir Ilyich Ulyanov, when he was exiled to the Central Siberian Plateau, may have taken his alias, Lenin, from the Lena River.

== Delta ==
At the end of the Lena River there is a large delta that extends 100 kilometres (62 mi) into the Laptev Sea and is about 400 km (250 mi) wide. The delta is frozen tundra for about seven months of the year, but in May the region is transformed into a lush wetland for a few months. Part of the area is protected as the Lena Delta Wildlife Reserve. Fyodor Matisen mapped the delta.

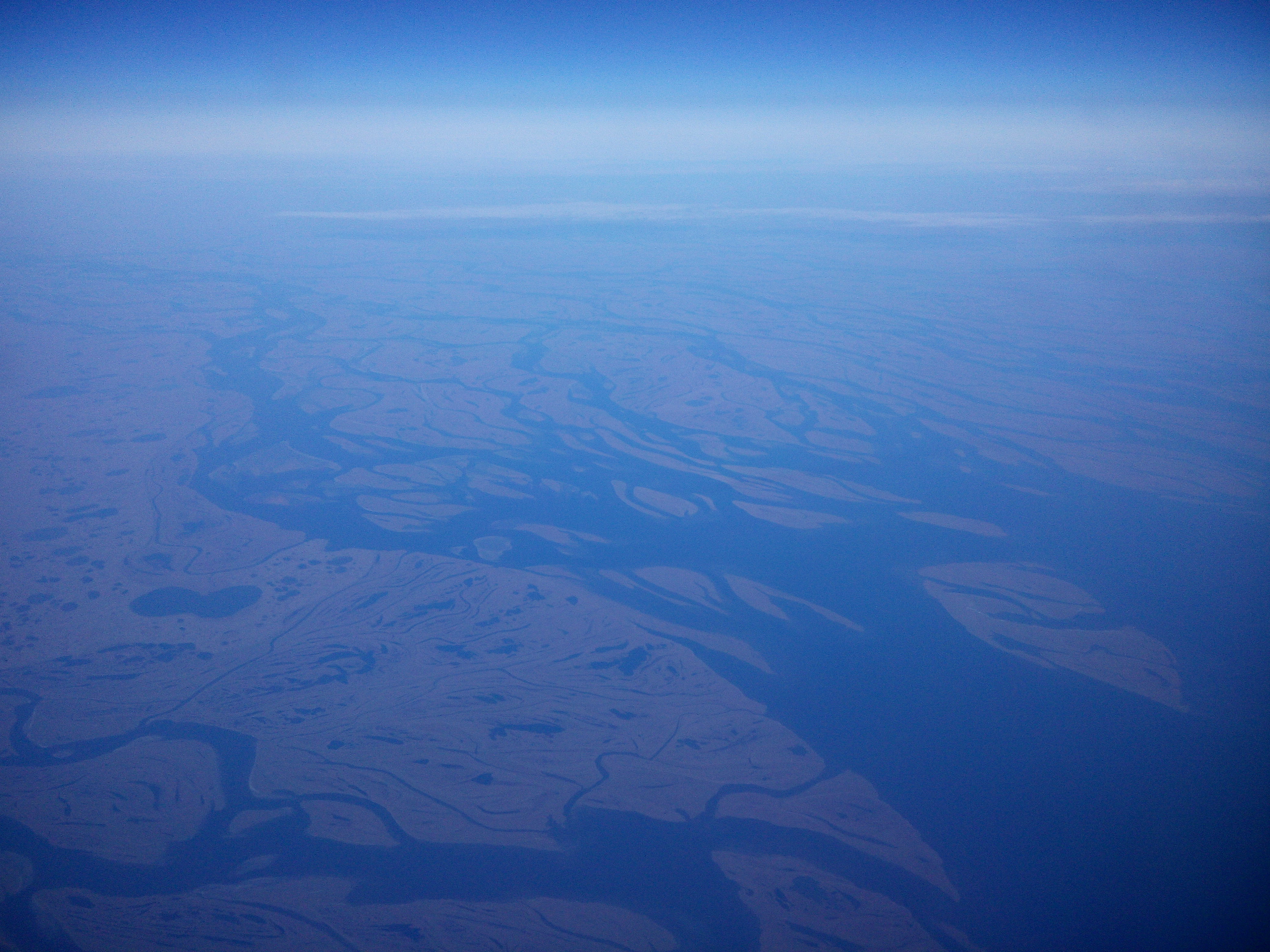
Lena River Delta in Autumn 2014

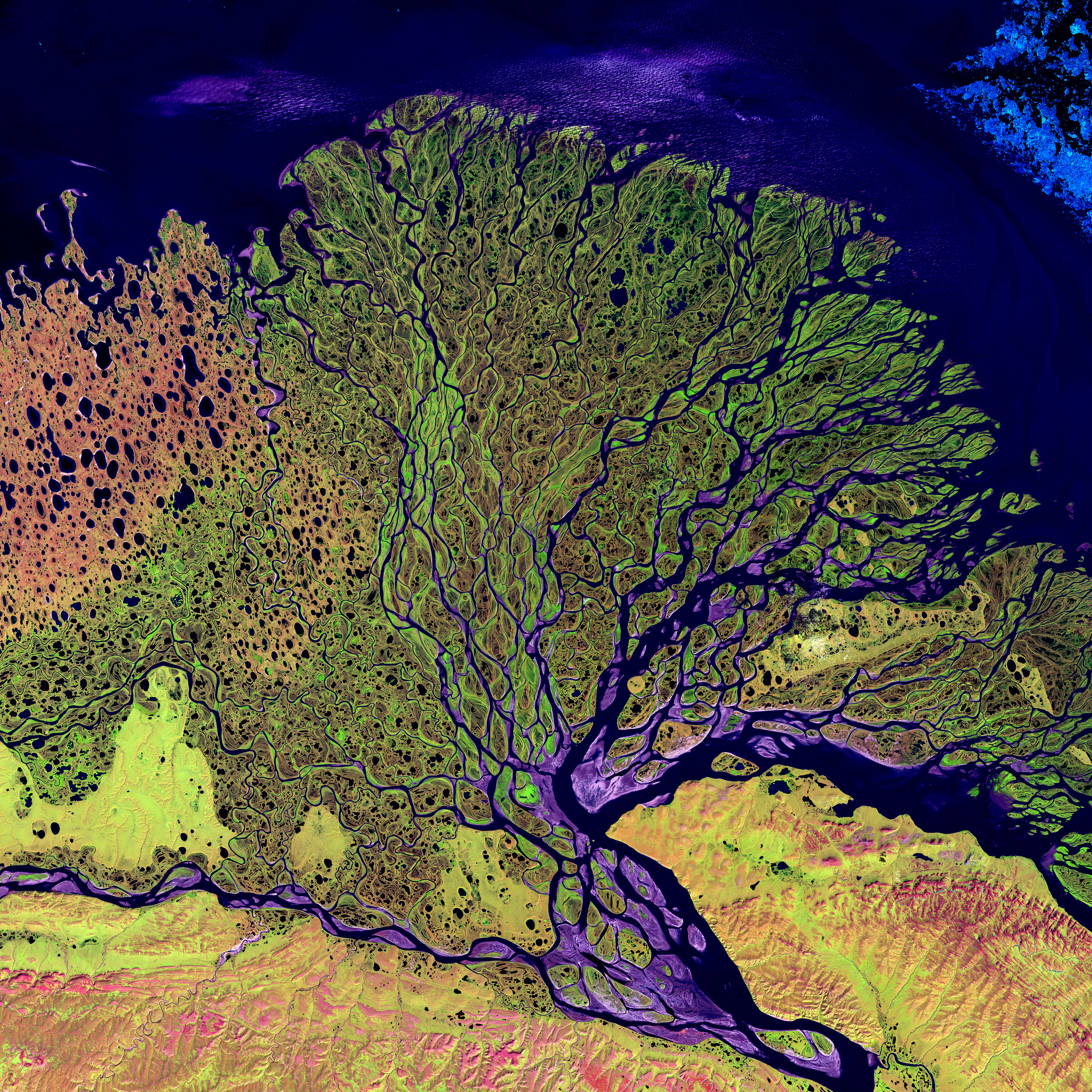
Lena river Delta by Landsat, February 2000

The Lena Delta divides into a multitude of flat islands. The largest is Arga Muora Sise, which is the 99th-largest island in the world. Other important islands are (from west to east): Chychas Aryta, Petrushka, Sagastyr, Samakh Ary Diyete, Turkan Bel'keydere, Sasyllakh Ary, Kolkhoztakh Bel'keydere, Grigoriy Diyelyakh Bel'kee (Grigoriy Islands), Nerpa Uolun Aryta, Misha Bel'keydere, Atakhtay Bel'kedere, Arangastakh, Urdiuk Pastakh Bel'key, Agys Past' Aryta, Dallalakh Island, Otto Ary, Ullakhan Ary and Orto Ues Aryta.

Turukannakh-Kumaga is a long and narrow island off the Lena Delta's western shore.

One of the Lena delta islands, Ostrov Amerika-Kuba-Aryta or Ostrov Kuba-Aryta, was perhaps named after the island of Cuba during Soviet times. It is on the northern edge of the delta. If named before the Soviet times, it is possible that the islands were named after the American Swan, found in the area (Kuba being the Yakut term for 'swan').

== Fish ==
As Lena is located at remote and undeveloped regions of the Russian Far East, its fish resource is very well preserved. Some of the species found in the river include: Siberian taimen, Siberian sturgeon, Upper Yenisei grayling.

== See also ==
- Lena Cheeks
- Lena Pillars
- Lena Plateau
- List of rivers of Russia
- List of longest undammed rivers
- Tukulan
- William Barr, writer of The First Soviet Convoy to the Mouth of the Lena.
