= Central Yakutian Lowland =

Low alluvial plain in Siberia, Russia

Central Yakutian Lowland Центральноякутская равнина Саха сирин ортоку намтала
- Alluvial plain
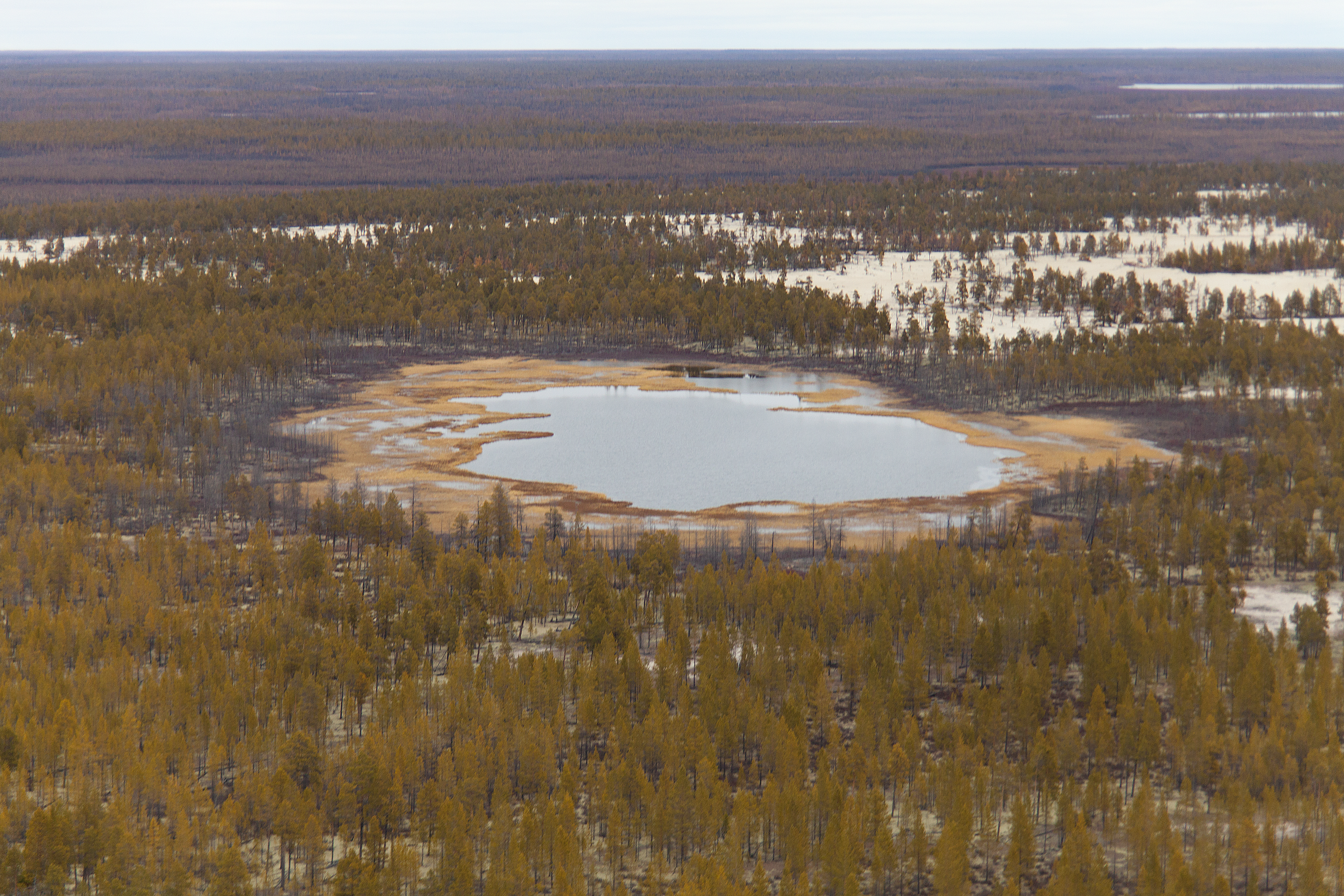
- Taiga landscape in Vilyuy District

- Location within Sakha Republic
- Coordinates: 64°30′N 121°0′E
- Location: Sakha Republic, Russia
- Part of: Siberia

Area
  - Total: 270,000 km^{2} (100,000 sq mi)
- Elevation: 60 meters (200 ft) to 200 meters (660 ft)

The Central Yakutian Lowland or the Central Yakutian Lowlands (Russian: Центральноякутская равнина, romanized: Tsentralnoyakutskaya ravnina; Yakut: Саха сирин ортоку намтала), also known as the Central Yakutian Plain or the Vilyuy Lowland, is a low alluvial plain in Siberia, Russia.

Administratively the territory of the lowland is part of the Sakha Republic (Yakutia). It is an extensive plain located in the transition zone between Central and Eastern Siberia and is one of the Great Russian Regions. The main city is Yakutsk, with a number of settlements near it, but the area of the lowland is largely uninhabited elsewhere.

== Geography ==
The Central Yakutian Lowlands extend along the middle basin of the Lena River and partly further downstream and are about 900 kilometres (560 mi) in length and 350 kilometres (220 mi) wide. They drop gradually from the Central Siberian Plateau to the west and the Lena Plateau to the south and southwest. To the northwest the lowland merges with the North Siberian Lowland and to the north it is bound by the watershed fringing the Lena and Olenyok River basins. To the northeast and east the Central Yakutian Lowland reaches the foothills of the Verkhoyansk Range, westernmost part of the East Siberian Mountains.

The Central Yakutian Lowlands are a flat plain, slightly higher in its peripheral parts. Permafrost is continuous throughout the region. Owing to poor drainage, swamps and thermokarst lakes (alases), are common, as well as low bulges or bumps known as "bulgunnyakh" (Yakut: Булгунньах). In the northwest the Tukulan (Тукуланы) sand dunes are relief forms shaped by aeolian processes along the valley of the Lena River. There are also some areas of high soil salinity.

=== Hydrography ===
There are hundreds of river valleys all across the lowlands, which, besides the Lena, include the lower reaches of the Lena tributaries Vilyuy, Amga and Aldan. The entire length of the course of some of the large left tributaries of the Lena, such as the Lungkha, Tyugyuene, Sitte, Khanchaly and Kenkeme, falls wholly within the lowland area. These rivers are subject to spring floods during the thaw period and occasional rain floods in the summer. During the winter small rivers and rivulets freeze to the bottom. The largest lakes of the lowland are Nedzheli and Ulakhan-Kyuel.

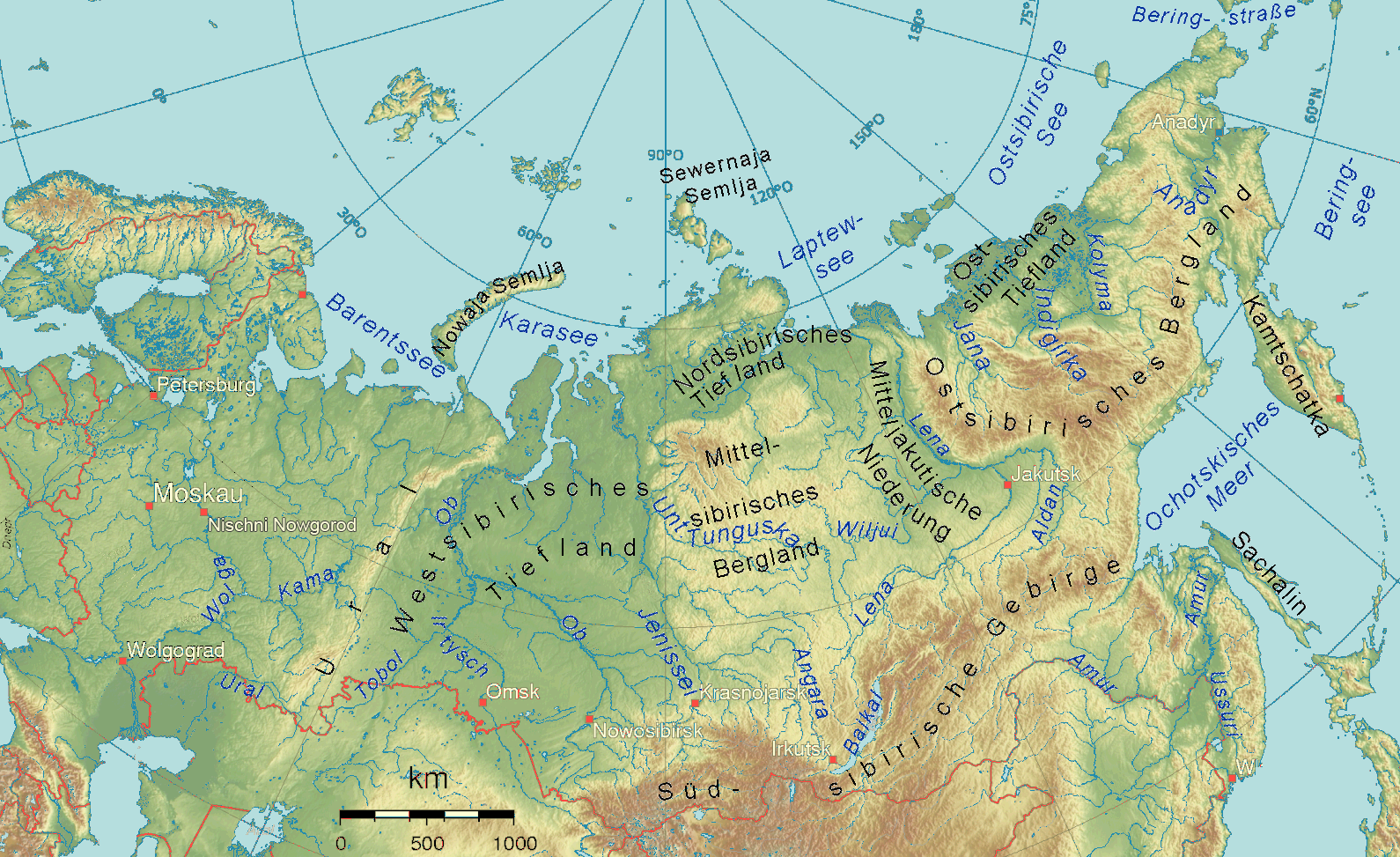
German map of the Russian geomorphological regions.

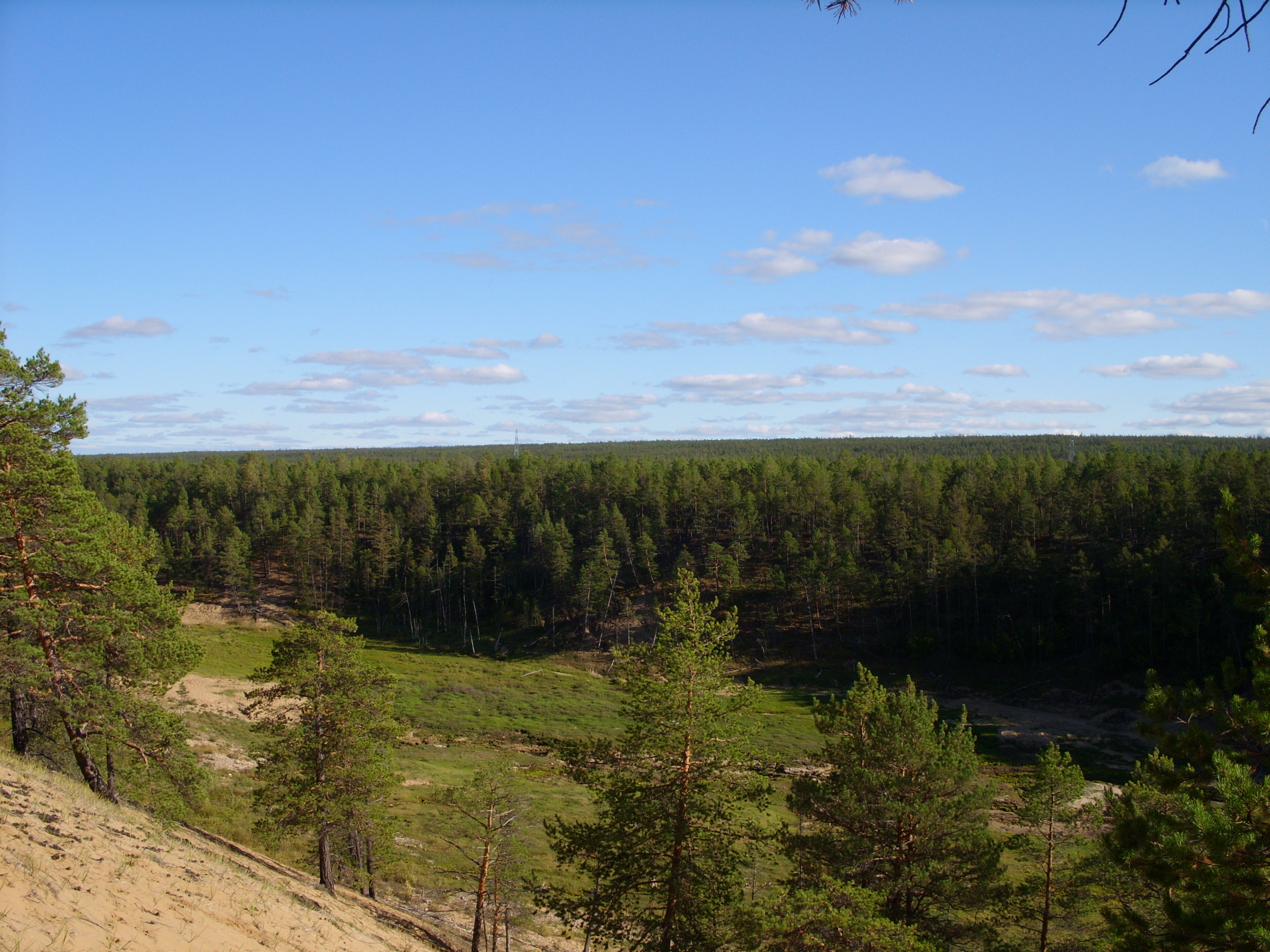
View of the lowland taiga.

== Geology ==
Geologically the lowland roughly corresponds to the eastern, lowest parts of the Vilyuy Syneclise. It is filled with Mesozoic deposits and Quaternary sands and loams, both of alluvial and eolian origin.

== Climate and flora ==
The climate prevailing in the lowland is an extreme subarctic climate (Köppen Dfd), continental and harsh, characterized by a very low annual rainfall of barely 300 millimetres (12 in) per year. 70% to 80% of the precipitation falls in the summer, mostly in the form of rain. The average air temperature in January is a frigid −45 °C (−49 °F). In July the average temperature is 17 °C (63 °F).

Most of the lowland is covered by taiga in which larch predominates. There are as well areas of birch forests, marshes and grassy meadows.

== See also ==
- Alas (geography)
