= Sangar, Sakha Republic =

Sangar Сангар
- Urban-type settlement

Other transcription(s)
  - Yakut: Сангаар
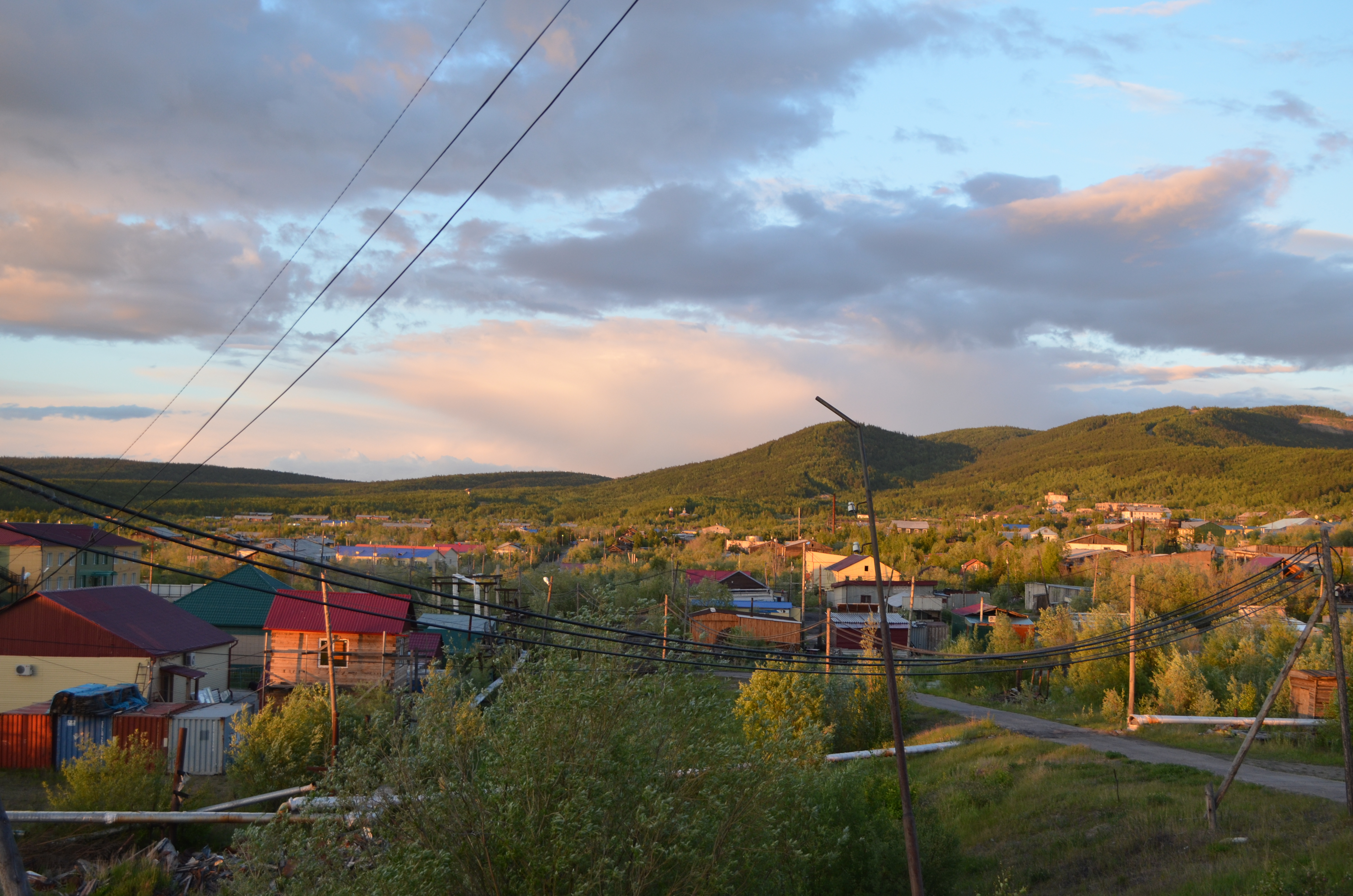
- View from the porch of the club "Shakhtar"

- Flag
- Interactive map of Sangar
- Location of Sangar Sangar (Sakha Republic)
- Coordinates: 63°55′N 127°28′E
- Country: Russia
- Federal subject: Sakha Republic
- Administrative district: Kobyaysky District
- SettlementSelsoviet: Settlement of Sangar
- Founded: 1928
- Urban-type settlement status since: 1940
- Elevation: 80 m (260 ft)

Population (2010 Census)
  - Total: 4,377
  - Estimate (2023): 3,270 (−25.3%)

Administrative status
  - Capital of: Kobyaysky District, Settlement of Sangar

Municipal status
  - Municipal district: Kobyaysky Municipal District
  - Urban settlement: Sangar Urban Settlement
  - Capital of: Kobyaysky Municipal District, Sangar Urban Settlement
- Time zone: UTC+
- Postal codes: 678300, 678309
- OKTMO ID: 98624151051

Sangar population
- 2010 Census: 4,377
- 2002 Census: 4,789
- 1989 Census: 10,107
- 1979 Census: 10,252

Sangar (Russian: Санга́р; Yakut: Сангаар, romanized: Sangaar) is an urban locality (an urban-type settlement) and the administrative center of Kobyaysky District of the Sakha Republic, Russia. As of the 2010 Census, its population was 4,377.

== Geography ==
Sangar is located on the right bank of the Lena River, on the opposite bank of the mouth of the Tyugyuene, 334 kilometers (208 mi) by road from Yakutsk, the capital of the republic.

== History ==
It was established in 1928 as a mining settlement. The name originates from the nearby Sangar-Khaya Mountain. On February 10, 1930, the Yakut Autonomous Soviet Socialist Republic was split into districts (uluses) and Sangar became a part of newly established Namsky District. In 1934, the mine was transferred to the Chief Directorate of the Northern Sea Route, which at the time administrated most of the industrial activity in the north of the Soviet Union. Coal from Sangar was transported to Tiksi on the coast of the Arctic Ocean and there distributed among various Arctic settlements. On April 20, 1937, Kobyaysky District was established, with the administrative center in the selo of Kobyay, and Sangar became a part of that district.

In 1938, the reconstruction of Sangar, which until that year did not have a hospital or a club, started. Urban-type settlement status was granted to it in 1940. In 1942, about two hundred of people were deported to exile to Sangar from Leningrad Oblast. In June 1943, a fatal accident occurred in the mine, and twenty-two miners were killed. In 1956, gas was discovered in the district, and the economy of Sangar started to reorient to gas production and transport. In 1959, the administrative center of the district was moved to Sangar. The mine eventually decayed and in the 1960s was transferred to the local authorities, finally closing down in 1997. Since the mine was providing most of the jobs, more than a half of the population of Sangar migrated and the infrastructure was considerably reduced.

== Administrative and municipal status ==
Within the framework of administrative divisions, the urban-type settlement of Sangar serves as the administrative center of Kobyaysky District. As an administrative division, it is, together with two rural localities, incorporated within Kobyaysky District as the Settlement of Sangar. As a municipal division, the Settlement of Sangar is incorporated within Kobyaysky Municipal District as Sangar Urban Settlement.

== Economy ==
=== Industry ===
The coal mine was closed down in 1997. Another coal mine is located about 20 kilometers (12 mi) from Sangar.

=== Transportation ===
There are no all-season roads, and land connections to Yakutsk are only possible during winter along a winter road (zimnik).

The Lena River is navigable.

Sangar has an airport which provides the only regular all-year-round means of transportation.
