= Bestyakh =

Bestyakh (Russian: Бестях) may refer to:

- Bestyakh, Khangalassky District, Sakha Republic, a selo in Bestyakhsky Rural Okrug of Khangalassky District
- Bestyakh, Zhigansky District, Sakha Republic, a selo in Bestyakhsky Rural Okrug of Zhigansky District
- Nizhny Bestyakh, an urban-type settlement in Megino-Kangalassky District
