= Nuochakha =

Nuochakha Нуочаха
- Selo
- Interactive map of Nuochakha
- Location of Nuochakha Nuochakha (Sakha Republic)
- Coordinates: 61°18′10″N 129°34′07″E
- Country: Russia
- Federal subject: Sakha Republic
- Administrative district: Khangalassky District
- Rural okrugSelsoviet: Zhemkonsky 2-y Rural Okrug

Population
  - Estimate (2002): 4 )

Municipal status
  - Municipal district: Khangalassky Municipal District
  - Rural settlement: Zhemkonsky 2-y Rural Settlement
- Time zone: UTC+
- Postal code: 678021
- OKTMO ID: 98644407106

Nuochakha (Russian: Нуочаха) is a rural locality (a selo), one of two settlements, in addition to Kerdyom, in Zhemkonsky 2-y Rural Okrug of Khangalassky District in the Sakha Republic, Russia. It is located 42 kilometers (26 mi) from Pokrovsk, the administrative center of the district and 39 kilometers (24 mi) from Kerdyom. Its population as of the 2002 Census was 4.
