= Kysyl-Yuryuyya =

Kysyl-Yuryuyya Кысыл-Юрюйя
- Selo
- Interactive map of Kysyl-Yuryuyya
- Location of Kysyl-Yuryuyya Kysyl-Yuryuyya (Sakha Republic)
- Coordinates: 61°22′N 129°01′E
- Country: Russia
- Federal subject: Sakha Republic
- Administrative district: Khangalassky District
- Rural okrugSelsoviet: Kachikatsky Rural Okrug

Population (2010 Census)
  - Total: 270
  - Estimate (2021): 231 (−14.4%)

Municipal status
  - Municipal district: Khangalassky Municipal District
  - Rural settlement: Kachikatsky Rural Settlement
- Time zone: UTC+
- Postal code: 678006
- OKTMO ID: 98644418106

Kysyl-Yuryuyya (Russian: Кысыл-Юрюйя; Yakut: Кыһыл Үрүйэ, Kıhıl Ürüye) is a rural locality (a selo) in Kachikatsky Rural Okrug of Khangalassky District in the Sakha Republic, Russia, located 20 kilometers (12 mi) from Pokrovsk, the administrative center of the district, and 7 kilometers (4.3 mi) from Kachikattsy, the administrative center of the rural okrug. Its population as of the 2010 Census was 270; down from 273 recorded in the 2002 Census.
