= Gavriil Ksenofontov =

Russian ethnographer (1888-1938)

- Гавриил Ксенофонтов
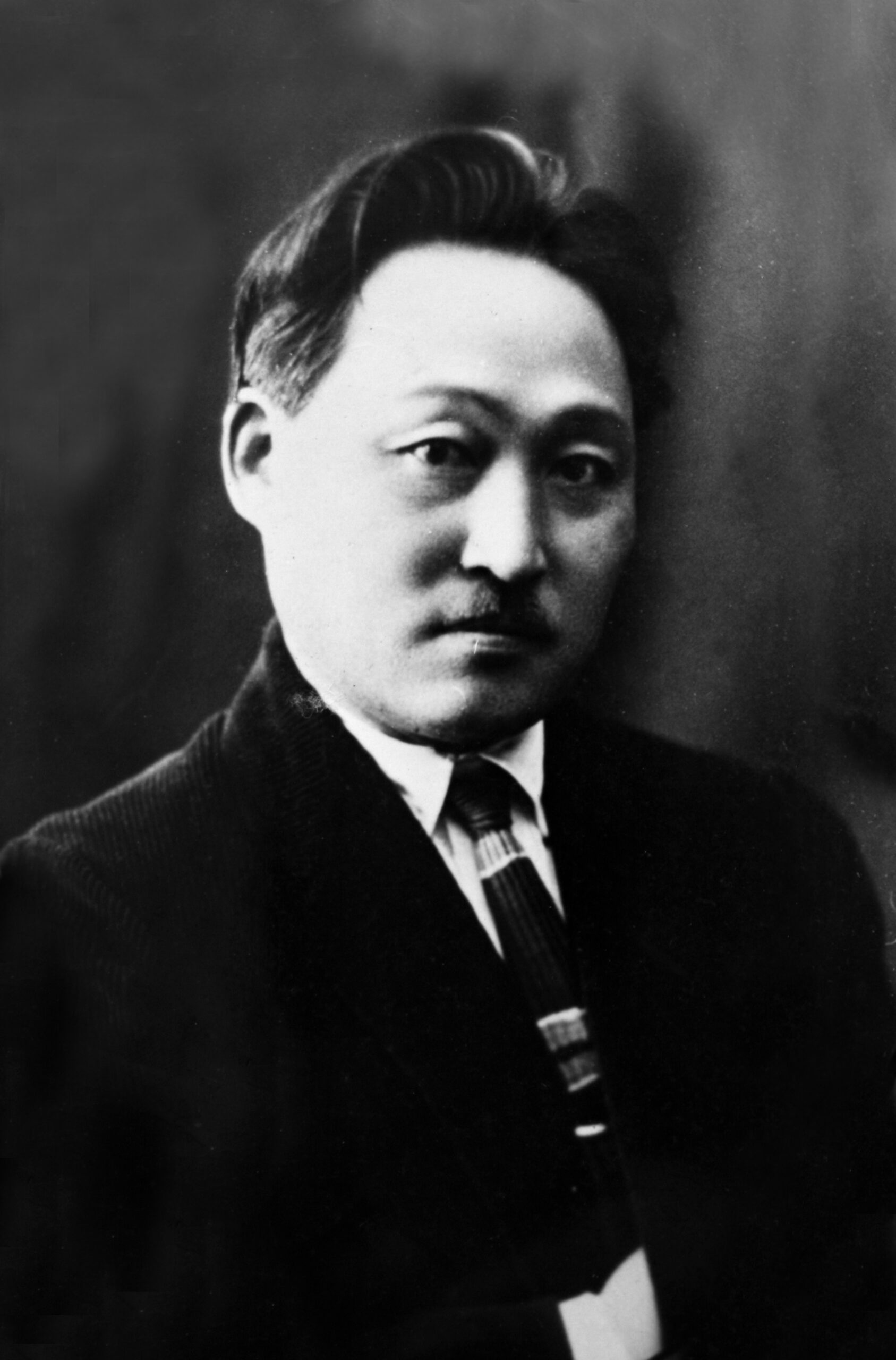
- Ksenofontov c. 1910s

Member of the Siberian Regional Duma
- In office 20 January 1918 – 10 November 1918
- Preceded by: Constituency established
- Succeeded by: Constituency abolished

Member of the Russian Constituent Assembly
- In office 25 November 1917 – 20 January 1918 (Note: The Constituent Assembly was declared dissolved by the Bolshevik-Left SR Soviet government, rendering the end the term served.)
- Preceded by: Constituency established
- Succeeded by: Constituency abolished
- Constituency: Yakutsk

Personal details
- Born: 16 January [O.S. 4 January] 1888 Tiit Aryy, 4th Malzhagarsky nasleg, West Kangalassky ulus, Yakutsk Oblast, Russian Empire (now Sakha Republic, Russia)
- Died: 28 August 1938 (aged 50) Kommunarka shooting ground, Moscow Oblast, Soviet Union
- Cause of death: Execution by firing squad
- Party: Yakutsk Labor Union of Federalists
- Spouse(s): Natalia Kandinskaya; Klavdiya Arsenyevna Rogova
- Children: Lenya
- Relatives: Pavel Ksenofontov (brother)
- Education: Imperial Tomsk University
- Occupation: Historian, ethnographer, folklorist, politician, lawyer

Gavriil Vasilyevich Ksenofontov (16 January [O.S. 4 January] 1888 — 28 August 1938) was a Yakutian historian, politician and lawyer who studied the history, ethnography and folklore of the Yakut, Evenki and Buryat peoples. He also served in the Russian Constituent Assembly and the Siberian Regional Duma during the Russian Revolution.

== Biography ==
Gavriil Ksenofontov was born on January 4 (16), 1888 in the Tiit Aryy, 4th Malzhagarsky nasleg, West Kangalassky ulus of Yakutia. He was the son of the head of the trading post, and had many brothers and sisters, among them Pavel Ksenofontov, a leader of the anti-Bolshevik movement during the Russian Civil War.

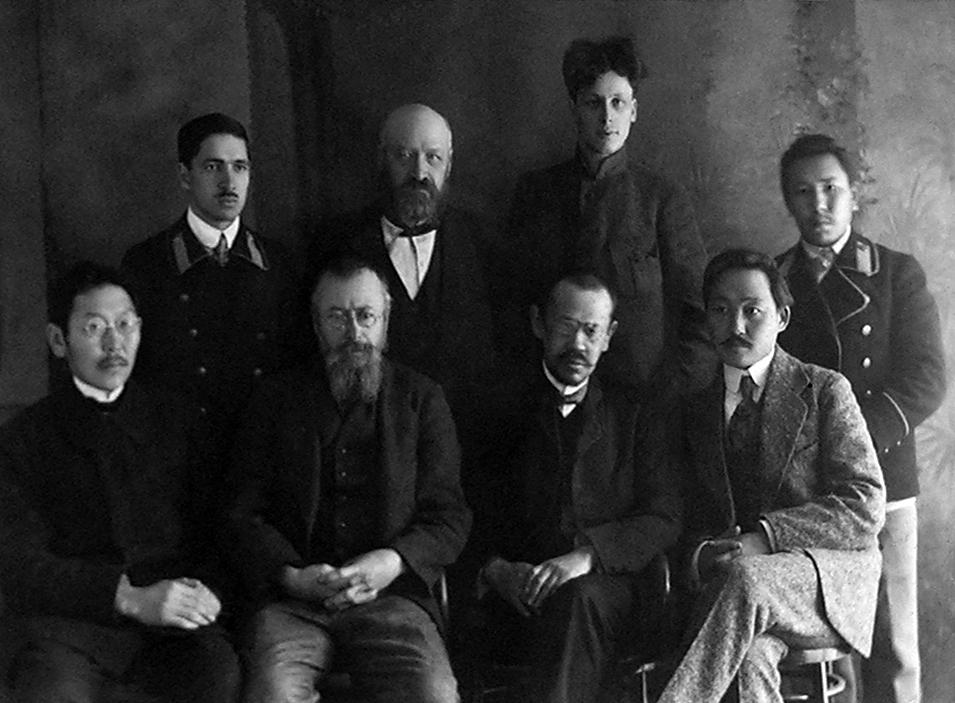
Members of the Siberian Regional Duma from Yakutia, 1917. Ksenofontov is seated on the far right.

In 1907, he graduated from the Yakutsk Real School. He received his education at the Law Faculty of Imperial Tomsk University, from which he graduated in 1912. From 1913 to 1917 he worked as a lawyer in Yakutsk. He served on the regional Public Safety Committee and the regional zemstvo council. Ksenofontov was one of the founders of the "Yakutsk Labor Union of Federalists" that emerged on June 25, 1917, from which he was elected to the All-Russian Constituent Assembly. After the dissolution of the Constituent Assembly, he was included in the Siberian Regional Duma.

From 1920 to 1923 he worked as an employee of the Irkutsk State University, where he was supervised by Bernhard Eduardovich Petri. Collecting materials for his research, he undertook a number of expeditions:

- 1921 - in the central regions of Yakutia;
- 1923-1924 - in the lower reaches of the Lena and Olenka;
- 1925-1926 - along a route that passed through Yakutsk, West Kangalassky ulus, Vilyuisky district, Chona, Erbogachen, Lower Tunguska, Krasnoyarsk, Khakassia, and Western Buryatia.

The material collected during the expeditions served as the basis for a number of works on folklore, ethnography and history. Ksenofontov's main idea was the conviction that folk memory in the form of oral traditions preserves information about real historical events and, therefore, it is possible to try to reconstruct this history by means of a careful comparative analysis of the records of oral traditions. Pointing towards this is fact that comparatively recent traditions are confirmed in Russian written sources.

From 1928 he lived in Irkutsk. In the 1930s he worked as a researcher at the Research Institute of Language and Culture at the Council of People's Commissars of the Yakut Autonomous Soviet Socialist Republic. He prepared two large works: “Elleyad” and “Uraanghai-sakhalar.” “Elleiad” is a collection of oral traditions dedicated to the legendary ancestor and cultural hero of the Yakuts Elley. His manuscript was discovered in 1965 by P. E. Efremov in the archives of the publishing house of anti-religious literature and published in 1977. “Uraanghai-sakhalar: Essays on the ancient history of the Yakuts" was published in 1937. In 1937 he moved to the city of Dmitrov, where he finished the second volume of “Uraanghai-sakhalar.”

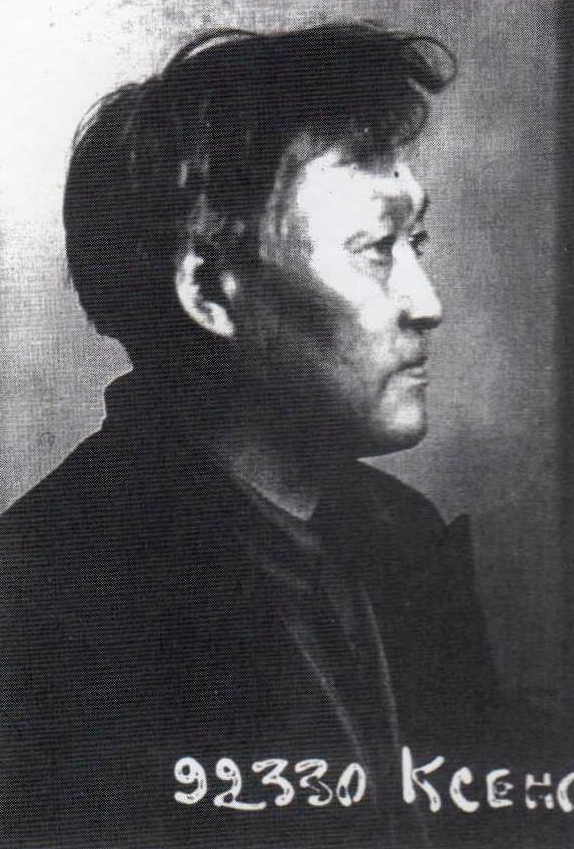
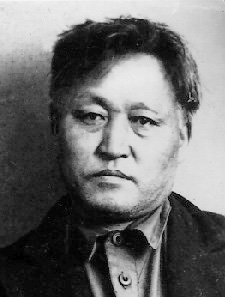
Ksenofontov's NKVD mugshot, 1938

On April 22, 1938, he was arrested in Moscow in the "Yakut case" together with Platon Oyunsky. On August 28, 1938, the Military Collegium of the Supreme Court of the Soviet Union sentenced him to death for espionage and executed him the same day. He was buried in the NKVD "Kommunarka" training ground. The Military Collegium rehabilitated him on August 22, 1957.

== Legacy ==
The name of G. V. Ksenofontov was given to the local history museum in Pokrovsk, and to the secondary school in the village of Tiit Aryy, Khangalas ulus (1993).

== Major works ==
- Prologue to the heroic epics of the Yakuts: olonkho [from the epic “Ereideeh Buruidaah Er sokotokh” / trans. from Yakut G.V. Ksenofontova] // Siberian Lights. - 1927. - No. 2. - P. 64-67.
- Nomadic life and religion: based on Yakut, Tungus and Buryat materials: fundamentals. abstract // Buryatology. - 1928. - No. 1-2. (5-6). - P. 1-11.
- New research on the history of the Yakut people // gas. Autonomous Yakutia. 1927. - No. 135, 136
- Images on the rocks of the Lena River within the Yakutsk District // Buryat Studies. 1927. - No. 3/4. - P. 64-70;
- Legends and stories about shamans among the Yakuts, Buryats and Tungus: (Materials on the mythology of the Ural-Altai tribes in Northern Asia). - Irkutsk, 1928 (republished: M., 1930);
- Khrestes, Shamanism and Christianity: (Facts and Conclusions). - Irkutsk, 1929;
- The cult of madness in Ural-Altai shamanism: (On the issue of the dying and resurrecting god). — Irkutsk, 1929;
- Pastoral life and mythological views of the peoples of the classical East. - Irkutsk, 1929;
- Deciphering two monuments of Orkhon writing from the western Baikal region by M. Rezenen // Language and Thinking. Vol. 1. - L., 1933. - P. 170-173;
- Uraanghai-sakhalar: Essays on the ancient history of the Yakuts. T. 1. - Irkutsk: Vost.-Sib. region book publishing house, 1937. - T. 1. - 576 pp.; 2nd ed.: [in 2 books/introductory article. V. N. Ivanova] - Yakutsk: Nat. publishing house of the Republic Sakha (Yakutia), 1992. - 416 pp.;
- Elleyada: Materials on the mythology and legendary history of the Yakuts. - M.: Nauka, 1977. - 348 p. (USSR Academy of Sciences. Sib. Department of Yakut Phil. Institute of Language, Literature and History); 2nd ed.: [compiled, edited, V. M. Nikiforov] - Yakutsk: Bichik, 2004. - 352 pp.;
- Shamanism: Selected Works (published 1928-1929). - M.: "North-South", 1992. - 318 p.;
- A. S. Pushkin “Altan Attaakyn” symbollaryn tuhunan (1937)// “I inspired good feelings with the lyre” (collection of articles)/ Comp. V. N. Pavlova; National b-ka RS(Y). - Yakutsk: Sakhapoligraphizdat, 1999;
- Letters of the ancient Turkic population of the Baikal region (from the handwritten materials of Ksenofontov G.V.) // Ilin. - 2005. - No. 5. - P. 55-66;

== Sources ==
- A. P. Okladnikov . "Elleiada" by G. V. Ksenofontov. In the book by G. V. Ksenofontov. "Elleiada" - Moscow: Nauka, 1977.
- Ksenofontov Gavril Vasilievich . Khangalas centralized library system. Retrieved January 16, 2016. Archived from the original on March 28, 2016.
- Ksenofontov Gavriil Vasilievich: People and Fates. Biographical Dictionary of Orientalists — Victims of Political Terror in the Soviet Period (1917-1991). Published by Ya. V. Vasilkov, M. Yu. — SPb.: Petersburg Oriental Studies, 2003. — 496 p.
- Yakutia-2013: calendar of significant and memorable dates. - Yakutsk, 2013. -S. 28-33. — Bibliography: p. 32-33 (21 titles);
- Encyclopedic Dictionary of Yakutia. — Novosibirsk, 2018. -S. 206;
- V. V. Pribytkina. Memory that became destiny / V. V. Pribytkina. - St. Petersburg, 2020. - P. 155-160;

== Works on Ksenofontov ==
- Khoroshikh P. On the report of G. V. Ksenofontov “The conquest of the territory of the Yakut region by the Yakuts and its reflection in the heroic epic and in the images on the rocks along the Lena River” // Vlast truda. 1922. No. 69-708;
- About the work of ethnographer G.V. Ksenofontov // Ksenofontov G.V. Uraanghai-sakhalar: Essays on the ancient history of the Yakuts. - T. 1. - Irkutsk, 1937. - P. 3-11;
- Gorky and Siberia. - Novosibirsk, 1961. - P. 262, 263, 276, 277;
- Ergis G.U. Results and tasks of studying Yakut folklore // Main problems of studying the poetic creativity of the peoples of Siberia and the Far East. - Ulan-Ude, 1961. - P. 53-56;
- G.V. Ksenofontov - Yakut ethnographer // Calendar of significant and memorable dates of the Yakut Autonomous Soviet Socialist Republic for 1963. - Yakutsk, 1963. - P. 8-10;
- Soviet historians-Yakutologists, 1973. - P. 30-40;
- Ergis G. U. On the scientific activity and manuscript archive of G. V. Ksenofontov // Essays on the history of Russian ethnography, folklore studies and anthropology. - 1978. - Issue 8. - P. 122-141;
- Nikolaev I., Ushnitsky I. Central business: Chronicle of Stalinist repressions in Yakutia. - Yakutsk, 1990. - P. 78-81; — RVost. No. 4. - P. 125;
- Ivanov V. N. “Uraanghai-sakhalar” G. V. Ksenofontova // Ksenofontov G. V. Uraanghai-sakhalar: Essays on the ancient history of the Yakuts. - T. 1, book. 1. - Yakutsk, 1992. - P. 5-10;
- Dyachkova A. N. G. V. Ksenofontov: scientist and socio-political figure. - Yakutsk, 2000;
- Romanova E. N. G. V. Ksenofontov: the myth of the wandering hero // Repressed ethnographers. - Issue 2. - M., 2003;
- G. V. Ksenofontov: Return to Oneself. Collection of scientific articles. - M., 1998;
- Gavriil Vasilievich Ksenofontov: photographs, documents. - Yakutsk, 2009.
