= Toyon-Ary =

Toyon-Ary Тойон-Ары
- Selo
- Interactive map of Toyon-Ary
- Location of Toyon-Ary Toyon-Ary (Sakha Republic)
- Coordinates: 61°14′N 128°23′E
- Country: Russia
- Federal subject: Sakha Republic
- Administrative district: Khangalassky District
- Rural okrugSelsoviet: Malzhagarsky 1-y Rural Okrug

Population
  - Estimate (2002): 153 )

Municipal status
  - Municipal district: Khangalassky Municipal District
  - Rural settlement: Malzhagarsky 1-y Rural Settlement
- Time zone: UTC+
- Postal code: 678013
- OKTMO ID: 98644423106

Toyon-Ary (Russian: Тойон-Ары; Yakut: Тойон Арыы, Toyon Arıı) is a rural locality (a selo) in Malzhagarsky 1-y Rural Okrug of Khangalassky District in the Sakha Republic, Russia, located 58 kilometers (36 mi) from Pokrovsk, the administrative center of the district and 20 kilometers (12 mi) from Bulgunnyakhtakh, the administrative center of the rural okrug. Its population as of the 2002 Census was 153.
