= Khotochchu =

Khotochchu Хоточчу
- Selo
- Interactive map of Khotochchu
- Location of Khotochchu Khotochchu (Sakha Republic)
- Coordinates: 61°33′N 129°24′E
- Country: Russia
- Federal subject: Sakha Republic
- Administrative district: Khangalassky District
- Rural okrugSelsoviet: Zhemkonsky 1-y Rural Okrug

Population (2010 Census)
  - Total: 265
  - Estimate (2021): 207 (−21.9%)

Municipal status
  - Municipal district: Khangalassky Municipal District
  - Rural settlement: Zhemkonsky 1-y Rural Settlement
- Time zone: UTC+
- Postal code: 678013
- OKTMO ID: 98644406106

Khotochchu (Russian: Хоточчу; Yakut: Хоточчу, Xotoççu) is a rural locality (a selo) in Zhemkonsky 1-y Rural Okrug of Khangalassky District in the Sakha Republic, Russia, located 25 kilometers (16 mi) from Pokrovsk, the administrative center of the district, and 18 kilometers (11 mi) from Charang, the administrative center of the rural okrug. Its population as of the 2010 Census was 265; unchanged from the 2002 Census.
