= Ulakh-An =

Ulakh-An Улах-Ан
- Selo
- Interactive map of Ulakh-An
- Location of Ulakh-An Ulakh-An (Sakha Republic)
- Coordinates: 61°36′48″N 129°13′57″E
- Country: Russia
- Federal subject: Sakha Republic
- Administrative district: Khangalassky District
- Rural okrugSelsoviet: Zhersky Rural Okrug

Population (2010 Census)
  - Total: 838
  - Estimate (2021): 809 (−3.5%)

Administrative status
  - Capital of: Zhersky Rural Okrug

Municipal status
  - Municipal district: Khangalassky Municipal District
  - Rural settlement: Zhersky Rural Settlement
  - Capital of: Zhersky Rural Settlement
- Time zone: UTC+
- Postal code: 678016
- OKTMO ID: 98644409101

Ulakh-An (Russian: Улах-Ан; Yakut: Уулаах-Аан, Uulaax-Aan) is a rural locality (a selo), the only inhabited locality, and the administrative center of Zhersky Rural Okrug of Khangalassky District in the Sakha Republic, Russia, located 16 kilometers (9.9 mi) from Pokrovsk, the administrative center of the district. Its population as of the 2010 Census was 838, up from 834 recorded during the 2002 Census.
