= Ulakhan-An =

Ulakhan-An Улахан-Ан
- Selo
- Interactive map of Ulakhan-An
- Location of Ulakhan-An Ulakhan-An (Sakha Republic)
- Coordinates: 61°17′53″N 128°15′56″E
- Country: Russia
- Federal subject: Sakha Republic
- Administrative district: Khangalassky District
- Rural okrugSelsoviet: Malzhagarsky 2-y Rural Okrug

Population
  - Estimate (2002): 1,007 )

Administrative status
  - Capital of: Malzhagarsky 2-y Rural Okrug

Municipal status
  - Municipal district: Khangalassky Municipal District
  - Rural settlement: Malzhagarsky 2-y Rural Settlement
  - Capital of: Malzhagarsky 2-y Rural Settlement
- Time zone: UTC+
- Postal code: 678023
- OKTMO ID: 98644425101

Ulakhan-An (Russian: Улахан-Ан; Yakut: Улахан-Аан, Ulaxan-Aan) is a rural locality (a selo), the administrative centre of and one of two settlements, in addition to Yelanka, in Malzhagarsky 2-y Rural Okrug of Khangalassky District in the Sakha Republic, Russia. It is located 67 kilometers (42 mi) from Pokrovsk, the administrative center of the district. Its population as of the 2002 Census was 1,007.
