= Bestyakhsky Rural Okrug =

Bestyakhsky Rural Okrug may refer to:

- Bestyakhsky Rural Okrug in Bestyakhsky District
- Bestyakhsky Rural Okrug in Isitsky District
- Bestyakhsky Rural Okrug in Zhigansky District
- (possibly) Bestyakhsky National Rural Okrug
