= Yelanka =

Yelanka Еланка
- Selo
- Interactive map of Yelanka
- Location of Yelanka Yelanka (Sakha Republic)
- Coordinates: 61°16′18″N 128°05′51″E
- Country: Russia
- Federal subject: Sakha Republic
- Administrative district: Khangalassky District
- Rural okrugSelsoviet: Malzhagarsky 2-y Rural Okrug

Population
  - Estimate (2002): 15 )

Municipal status
  - Municipal district: Khangalassky Municipal District
  - Rural settlement: Malzhagarsky 2-y Rural Settlement
- Time zone: UTC+
- Postal code: 678023
- OKTMO ID: 98644425106

Yelanka (Russian: Еланка) is a rural locality (a selo), one of two settlements, in addition to Ulakhan-An, in Malzhagarsky 2-y Rural Okrug of Khangalassky District in the Sakha Republic, Russia. It is located 78 kilometers (48 mi) from Pokrovsk, the administrative center of the district and 11 kilometers (6.8 mi) from Ulakhan-An. Its population as of the 2002 Census was 15.
