= Oy, Russia =

Oy Ой
- Selo
- Interactive map of Oy
- Location of Oy Oy (Sakha Republic)
- Coordinates: 61°32′N 129°11′E
- Country: Russia
- Federal subject: Sakha Republic
- Administrative district: Khangalassky District
- Rural okrugSelsoviet: Nemyuginsky Rural Okrug

Population
  - Estimate (2021): 2,302 )

Administrative status
  - Capital of: Nemyuginsky Rural Okrug

Municipal status
  - Municipal district: Khangalassky Municipal District
  - Rural settlement: Nemyuginsky Rural Settlement
  - Capital of: Nemyuginsky Rural Settlement
- Time zone: UTC+
- Postal code: 678012
- OKTMO ID: 98644435101

Oy (Russian: Ой; Yakut: Ой) is a rural locality (a selo), the only inhabited locality, and the administrative center of Nemyuginsky Rural Okrug of Khangalassky District in the Sakha Republic, Russia, located 7 kilometers (4.3 mi) from Pokrovsk, the administrative center of the district. Its population numbered 2,302 per 2021 census, up from the 2010 Census, where the population was 2,266, but down from 2,305 recorded during the 2002 Census.
