= Lyutenge =

River in Russia

Lyutenge Yakut: Лүүтэҥкэ
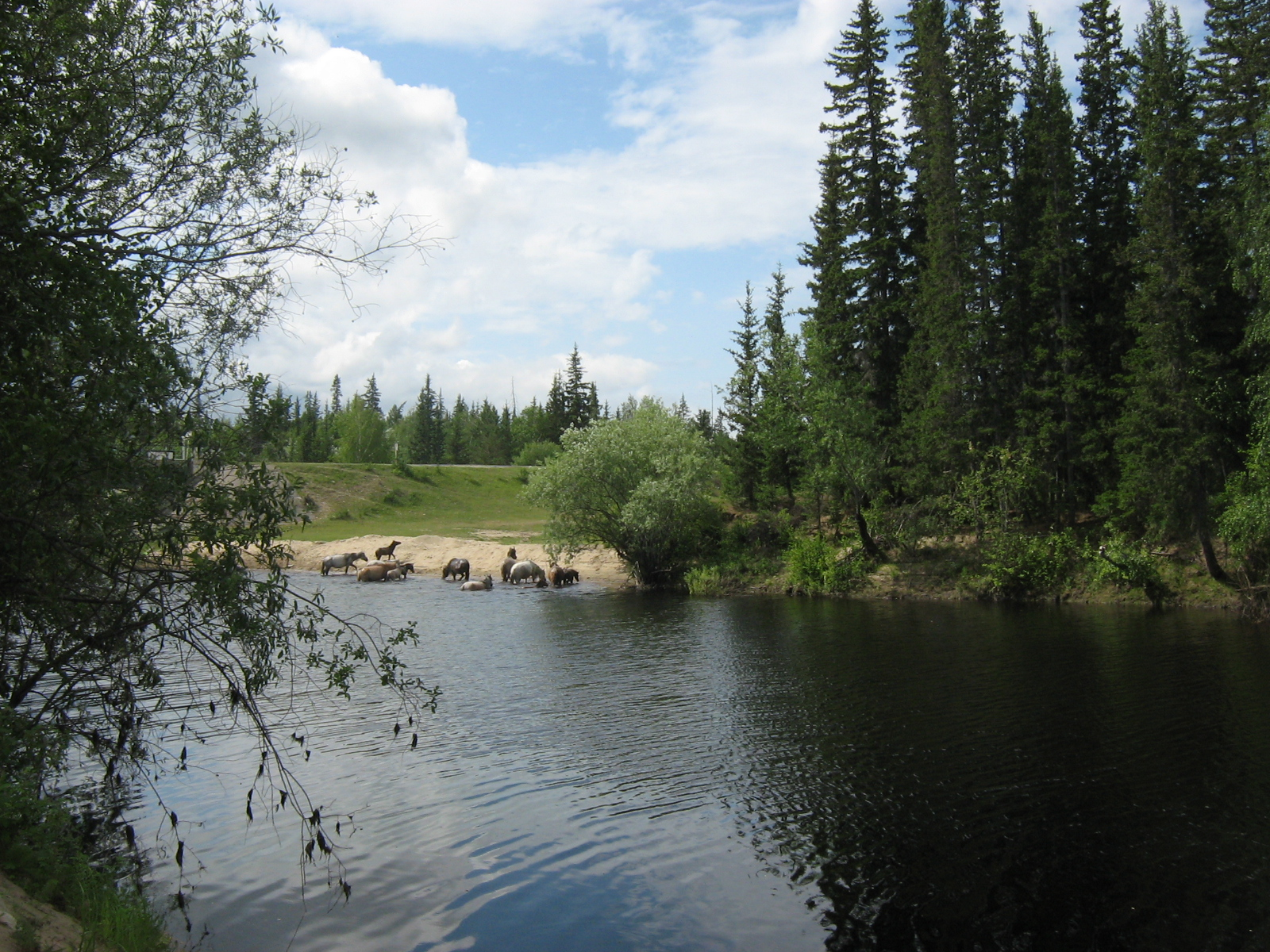
- View of the river

- Location in the Sakha Republic, Russia

Location
- Country: Sakha, Russia

Physical characteristics
- Source
  - location: Lena Plateau
  - coordinates: 60°55′05″N 128°43′19″E
- Mouth: Lena
  - coordinates: 61°26′32″N 129°11′33″E
  - elevation: 91 m (299 ft)
- Length: 140 km (87 mi)
- Basin size: 1,830 km^{2} (710 sq mi)

Basin features
- Progression: Lena→ Laptev Sea

The Lyutenge (Russian: Лютенге; Yakut: Лүүтэҥкэ, Lüüteŋke, obsolete "Люютэнкэ") is a river in the Sakha Republic, Russia. It is a right tributary of the Lena and has a length of 140 km (87 mi).

There are unusual rock formations by the river, the Turuuk Khaya Rocks, a protected area.

== Course ==
The river begins in the Byldanyany Lake, a small lake with a surface of 1 square kilometre (0.39 sq mi) located in the Lena Plateau. Its upper course is in the southern part of Khangalassky District close to the A360 Lena Highway, not far from Aldan District. It flows roughly southeastwards. The Lyutenge meets the right bank of the Lena by Kerdyom village, opposite the town of Pokrovsk and 1,577 km (980 mi) from the Lena's mouth.

The Lyutenge River freezes between October and May. The main tributaries of the Lyutenge are the Kuon Kachah, Berdigasteheh, Kedige (Ulakhan-Kuudaly), Kuraanakh, Eselaheh and Kuuduman.

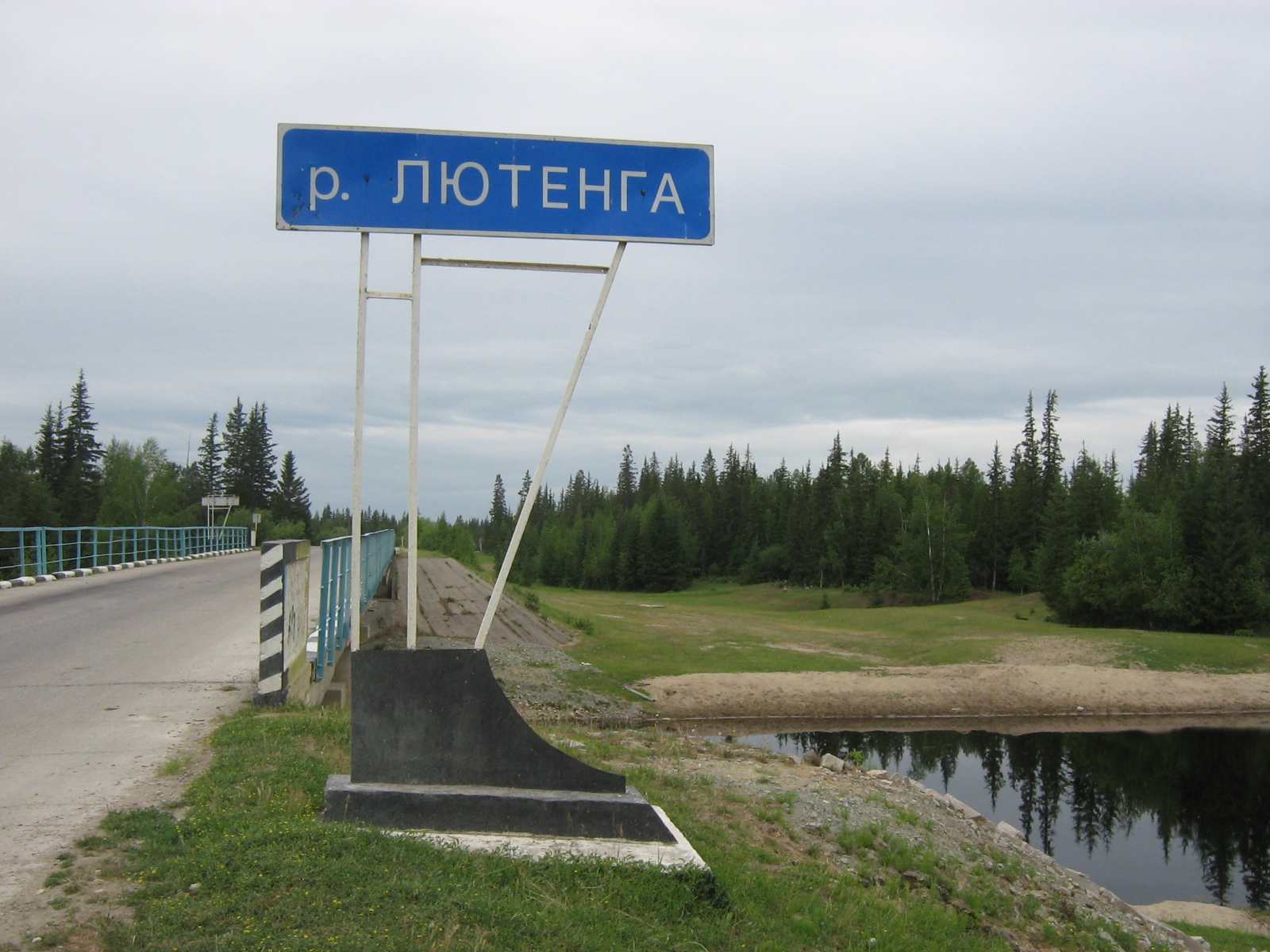
Road bridge over the river.

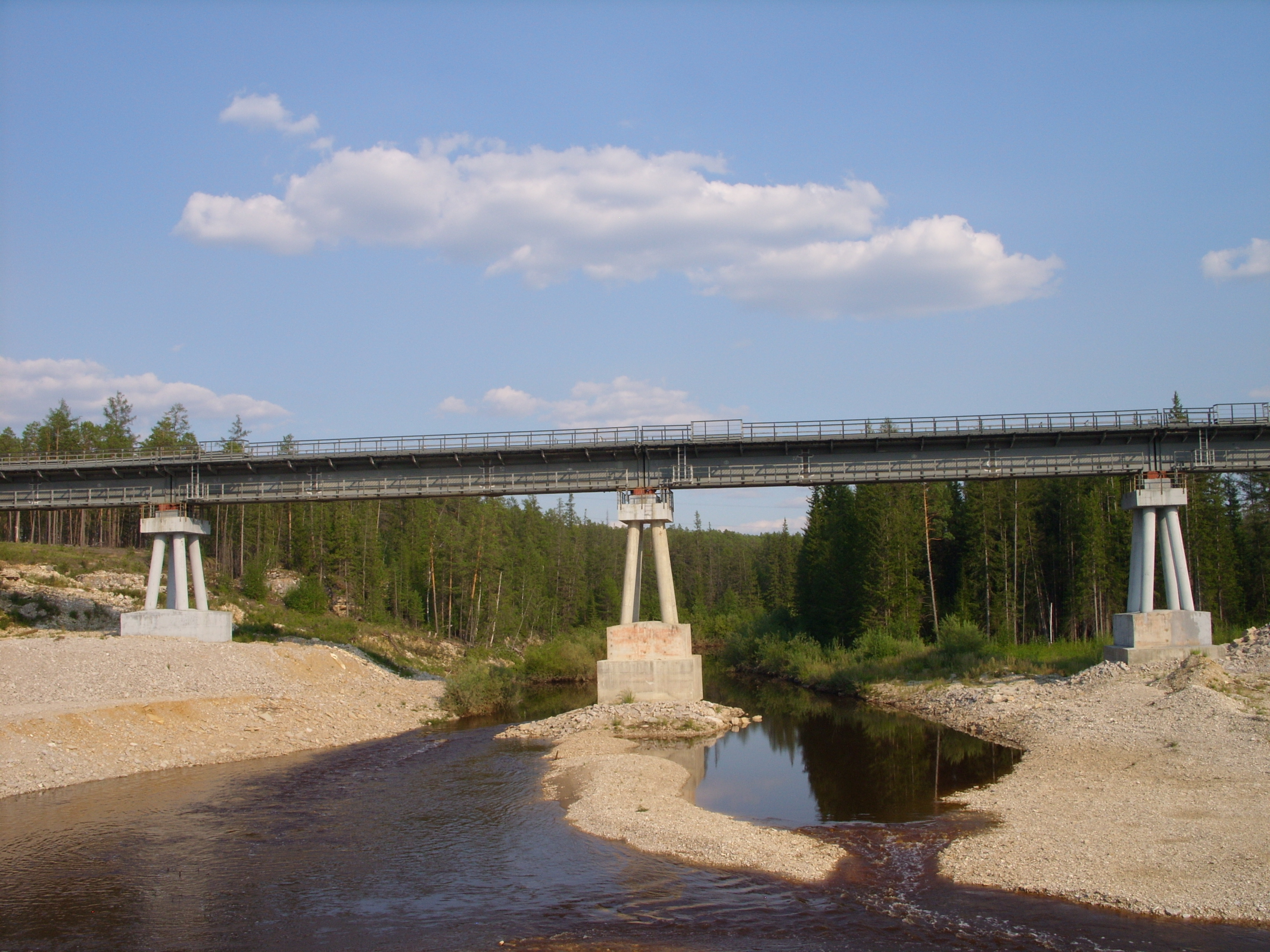
Railway bridge over the river.

== See also ==
- Amur–Yakutsk Mainline
- List of rivers of Russia
