= Sinsk =

Sinsk Синск
- Selo
- Interactive map of Sinsk
- Location of Sinsk Sinsk (Sakha Republic)
- Coordinates: 61°08′N 126°51′E
- Country: Russia
- Federal subject: Sakha Republic
- Administrative district: Khangalassky District
- Rural okrugSelsoviet: Sinsky Rural Okrug

Population (2010 Census)
  - Total: 976
  - Estimate (2021): 863 (−11.6%)

Administrative status
  - Capital of: Sinsky Rural Okrug

Municipal status
  - Municipal district: Khangalassky Municipal District
  - Rural settlement: Sinsky Rural Settlement
  - Capital of: Sinsky Rural Settlement
- Time zone: UTC+
- Postal code: 678025
- OKTMO ID: 98644445101

Sinsk (Russian: Синск; Yakut: Сиинэ, Siine) is a rural locality (a selo), the only inhabited locality, and the administrative center of Sinsky Rural Okrug of Khangalassky District in the Sakha Republic, Russia, located 157 kilometers (98 mi) from Pokrovsk, the administrative center of the district. Its population as of the 2010 Census was 976, up from 975 recorded during the 2002 Census.
