= Chkalov, Khangalassky District, Sakha Republic =

Chkalov Чкалов
- Selo
- Interactive map of Chkalov
- Location of Chkalov Chkalov (Sakha Republic)
- Coordinates: 61°11′11″N 127°45′11″E
- Country: Russia
- Federal subject: Sakha Republic
- Administrative district: Khangalassky District
- Rural okrugSelsoviet: Tit-Arinsky Rural Okrug
- Elevation: 97 m (318 ft)

Population
  - Estimate (2002): 284 )

Municipal status
  - Municipal district: Khangalassky Municipal District
  - Rural settlement: Tit-Arinsky Rural Settlement
- Time zone: UTC+
- Postal code: 678024
- OKTMO ID: 98644450111

Chkalov (Russian: Чкалов) is a rural locality (a selo), one of two settlements, in addition to Kharyyalakh and Tit-Ary, the centre of the rural settlement, in Tit-Arinsky Rural Okrug of Khangalassky District in the Sakha Republic, Russia. It is located 116 kilometers (72 mi) from Pokrovsk, the administrative center of the district and 3 kilometers (1.9 mi) from Tit-Ary. Its population as of the 2002 Census was 284.
