= Mokhsogollokh =

Mokhsogollokh Мохсоголлох
- Urban-type settlement

Other transcription(s)
  - Yakut: Мохсоҕоллоох
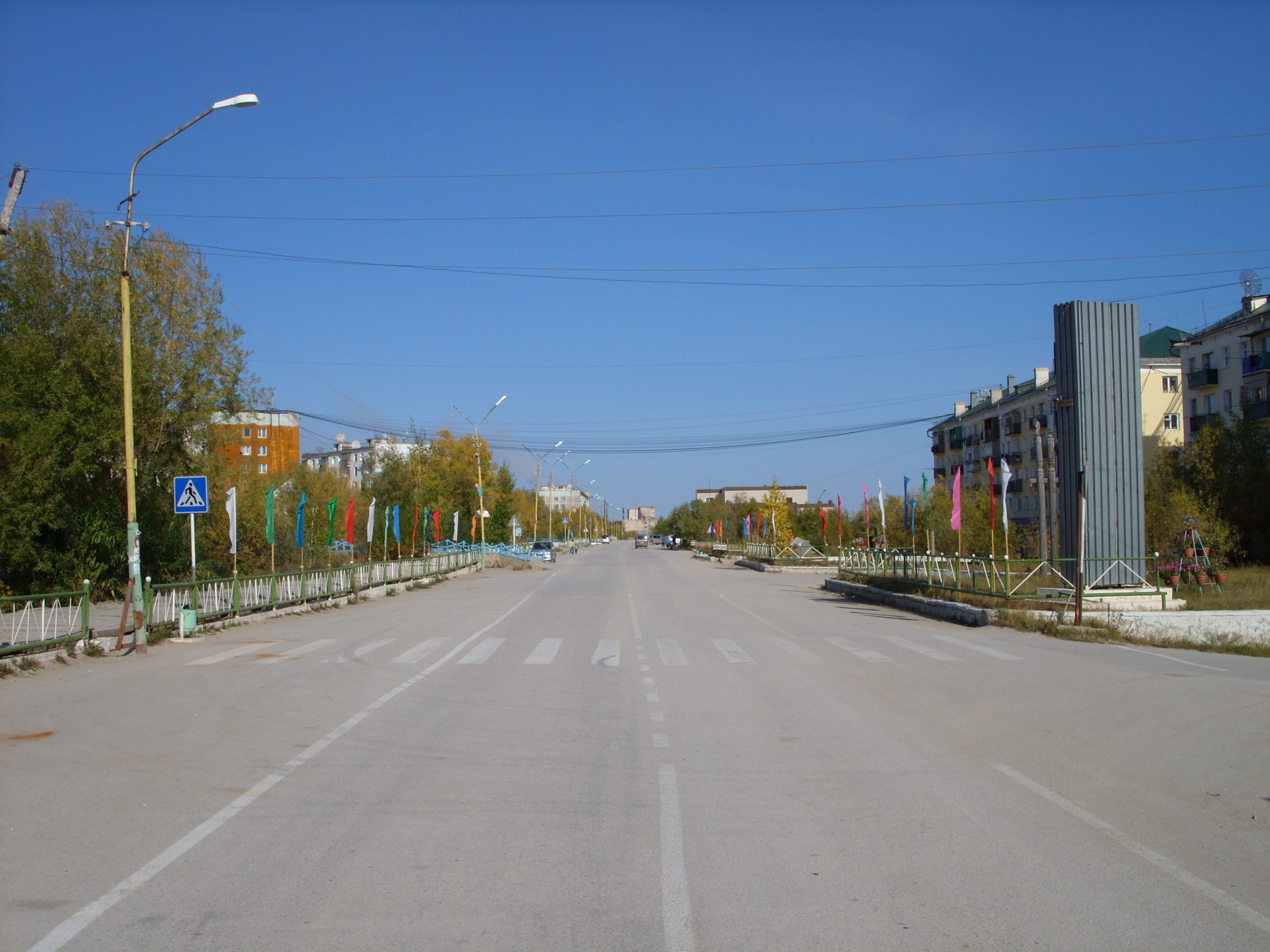
- Zavodskaya Street in Mokhsogollokh
- Interactive map of Mokhsogollokh
- Location of Mokhsogollokh Mokhsogollokh (Sakha Republic)
- Coordinates: 61°24′N 128°56′E
- Country: Russia
- Federal subject: Sakha Republic
- Administrative district: Khangalassky District
- SettlementSelsoviet: Settlement of Mokhsogollokh
- Urban-type settlement status since: 1964

Population (2010 Census)
  - Total: 6,698
  - Estimate (2023): 5,192 (−22.5%)

Administrative status
  - Capital of: Settlement of Mokhsogollokh

Municipal status
  - Municipal district: Khangalassky Municipal District
  - Urban settlement: Mokhsogollokh Urban Settlement
  - Capital of: Mokhsogollokh Urban Settlement
- Time zone: UTC+
- Postal code: 678020
- OKTMO ID: 98644157051

Mokhsogollokh population
- 2010 Census: 6,698
- 2002 Census: 7,181
- 1989 Census: 6,849
- 1979 Census: 4,306

Mokhsogollokh (Russian: Мохсоголло́х; Yakut: Мохсоҕоллоох, romanized: Moxsoğolloox) is an urban locality (an urban-type settlement) in Khangalassky District of the Sakha Republic, Russia, located on the left bank of the Lena River, 24 kilometers (15 mi) from Pokrovsk, the administrative center of the district. As of the 2010 Census, its population was 6,698.

== History ==
Urban-type settlement status was granted to it in 1964.

== Administrative and municipal status ==
Within the framework of administrative divisions, the urban-type settlement of Mokhsogollokh is incorporated within Khangalassky District as the Settlement of Mokhsogollokh. As a municipal division, the Settlement of Mokhsogollokh is incorporated within Khangalassky Municipal District as Mokhsogollokh Urban Settlement.
