= Kharyyalakh, Khangalassky District, Sakha Republic =

Kharyyalakh Харыялах
- Selo
- Interactive map of Kharyyalakh
- Location of Kharyyalakh Kharyyalakh (Sakha Republic)
- Coordinates: 61°13′29″N 128°55′29″E
- Country: Russia
- Federal subject: Sakha Republic
- Administrative district: Khangalassky District
- Rural okrugSelsoviet: Tit-Arinsky Rural Okrug

Population
  - Estimate (2002): 8 )

Municipal status
  - Municipal district: Khangalassky Municipal District
  - Rural settlement: Tit-Arinsky Rural Settlement
- Time zone: UTC+
- Postal code: 678011
- OKTMO ID: 98644450106

Kharyyalakh (Russian: Харыялах; Yakut: Харыйалаах, Xarıyalaax) is a rural locality (a selo), one of three settlements, in addition to Chkalov and Tit-Ary, the centre of the rural settlement, in Tit-Arinsky Rural Okrug of Khangalassky District in the Sakha Republic, Russia. It is located 108 kilometers (67 mi) from Pokrovsk, the administrative center of the district and 11 kilometers (6.8 mi) from Bestyakh. Its population as of the 2002 Census was 8.
