= Nokhoroy =

Nokhoroy Нохорой
- Selo
- Interactive map of Nokhoroy
- Location of Nokhoroy Nokhoroy (Sakha Republic)
- Coordinates: 60°49′04″N 125°22′25″E
- Country: Russia
- Federal subject: Sakha Republic
- Administrative district: Khangalassky District
- Rural okrugSelsoviet: Isitsky Rural Okrug

Population
  - Estimate (2002): 42 )

Municipal status
  - Municipal district: Khangalassky Municipal District
  - Rural settlement: Isitsky Rural Settlement
- Time zone: UTC+
- Postal code: 678021
- OKTMO ID: 98644412106

Nokhoroy (Russian: Нохорой; Yakut: Нохорой, Noxoroy) is a rural locality (a selo), one of two settlements, in addition to Isit, in Bestyakhsky Rural Okrug of Isitsky District in the Sakha Republic, Russia. It is located 252 kilometers (157 mi) from Pokrovsk, the administrative center of the district and 4 kilometers (2.5 mi) from Isit. Its population as of the 2002 Census was 42.
