= Kytyl-Dyura =

Kytyl-Dyura Кытыл-Дюра
- Selo
- Interactive map of Kytyl-Dyura
- Location of Kytyl-Dyura Kytyl-Dyura (Sakha Republic)
- Coordinates: 60°58′12″N 126°01′32″E
- Country: Russia
- Federal subject: Sakha Republic
- Administrative district: Khangalassky District
- Rural okrugSelsoviet: Malzhagarsky 5-y Rural Okrug
- Elevation: 146 m (479 ft)

Population (2010 Census)
  - Total: 453
  - Estimate (2021): 435 (−4%)

Administrative status
  - Capital of: Malzhagarsky 5-y Rural Okrug

Municipal status
  - Municipal district: Khangalassky Municipal District
  - Rural settlement: Malzhagarsky 5-y Rural Settlement
  - Capital of: Malzhagarsky 5-y Rural Settlement
- Time zone: UTC+
- Postal code: 678027
- OKTMO ID: 98644428101

Kytyl-Dyura (Russian: Кытыл-Дюра; Yakut: Кытыл-Дьура, Kıtıl-Cura) is a rural locality (a selo), the only inhabited locality, and the administrative center of Malzhagarsky 5-y Rural Okrug of Khangalassky District in the Sakha Republic, Russia, located 216 kilometers (134 mi) from Pokrovsk, the administrative center of the district. Its population as of the 2010 Census was 453, of whom 223 were male and 230 female, down from 510 recorded during the 2002 Census.
