= Tit-Ebya =

Tit-Ebya Тит-Эбя
- Selo
- Interactive map of Tit-Ebya
- Location of Tit-Ebya Tit-Ebya (Sakha Republic)
- Coordinates: 61°29′N 129°21′E
- Country: Russia
- Federal subject: Sakha Republic
- Administrative district: Khangalassky District
- Rural okrugSelsoviet: Zhemkonsky 1-y Rural Okrug

Population
  - Estimate (2002): 802 )

Administrative status
  - Capital of: Zhemkonsky 1-y Rural Okrug

Municipal status
  - Municipal district: Khangalassky Municipal District
  - Rural settlement: Zhemkonsky 1-y Rural Settlement
  - Capital of: Zhemkonsky 1-y Rural Settlement
- Time zone: UTC+
- Postal code: 678013
- OKTMO ID: 98644406101

Tit-Ebya (Russian: Тит-Эбя; Yakut: Тиит-Эбэ, Tiit-Ebe) is a rural locality (a selo) and the administrative center of Zhemkonsky 1-y Rural Okrug of Khangalassky District in the Sakha Republic, Russia, located 10 kilometers (6.2 mi) from Pokrovsk, the administrative center of the district. Its population as of the 2002 Census was 802.

== Geography ==
The village is located by the bank of a branch of the Lena, near the mouth of river Menda, flowing from the Lena Plateau.
