= Chapayevo, Khangalassky District, Sakha Republic =

Chapayevo Чапаево
- Selo
- Interactive map of Chapayevo
- Location of Chapayevo Chapayevo (Sakha Republic)
- Coordinates: 61°39′N 129°23′E
- Country: Russia
- Federal subject: Sakha Republic
- Administrative district: Khangalassky District
- Rural okrugSelsoviet: Oktyomsky Rural Okrug

Population
  - Estimate (2002): 786 )

Municipal status
  - Municipal district: Khangalassky Municipal District
  - Rural settlement: Oktyomsky Rural Settlement
- Time zone: UTC+
- Postal code: 678011
- OKTMO ID: 98644440106

Chapayevo (Russian: Чапаево) is a rural locality (a selo) in Oktyomsky Rural Okrug of Khangalassky District in the Sakha Republic, Russia, located 32 kilometers (20 mi) from Pokrovsk, the administrative center of the district and 3 kilometers (1.9 mi) from Oktyomtsy, the administrative center of the rural okrug. Its population as of the 2002 Census was 786.
