= Yedey, Khangalassky District, Sakha Republic =

Yedey Едей
- Selo
- Interactive map of Yedey
- Location of Yedey Yedey (Sakha Republic)
- Coordinates: 61°07′03″N 126°24′28″E
- Country: Russia
- Federal subject: Sakha Republic
- Administrative district: Khangalassky District
- Rural okrugSelsoviet: Malzhagarsky 4-y Rural Okrug

Population (2010 Census)
  - Total: 386
  - Estimate (2021): 373 (−3.4%)

Administrative status
  - Capital of: Malzhagarsky 4-y Rural Okrug

Municipal status
  - Municipal district: Khangalassky Municipal District
  - Rural settlement: Malzhagarsky 4-y Rural Settlement
  - Capital of: Malzhagarsky 4-y Rural Settlement
- Time zone: UTC+
- Postal code: 678026
- OKTMO ID: 98644427101

Yedey (Russian: Едей; Yakut: Үөдэй, Üödey) is a rural locality (a selo), the only inhabited locality, and the administrative center of Malzhagarsky 4-y Rural Okrug of Khangalassky District in the Sakha Republic, Russia, located 185 kilometers (115 mi) from Pokrovsk, the administrative center of the district. Its population as of the 2010 Census was 386, of whom 197 were male and 189 female, up from 364 recorded during the 2002 Census.
