= Oktyomtsy =

Oktyomtsy Октёмцы
- Selo
- Interactive map of Oktyomtsy
- Location of Oktyomtsy Oktyomtsy (Sakha Republic)
- Coordinates: 61°39′49″N 129°24′55″E
- Country: Russia
- Federal subject: Sakha Republic
- Administrative district: Khangalassky District
- Rural okrugSelsoviet: Oktyomsky Rural Okrug

Population
  - Estimate (2002): 1,552 )

Administrative status
  - Capital of: Oktyomsky Rural Okrug

Municipal status
  - Municipal district: Khangalassky Municipal District
  - Rural settlement: Oktyomsky Rural Settlement
  - Capital of: Oktyomsky Rural Settlement
- Time zone: UTC+
- Postal code: 678011
- OKTMO ID: 98644440101

Oktyomtsy (Russian: Октёмцы; Yakut: Өктөм, Öktöm) is a rural locality (a selo), the administrative centre of and one of two settlements, in addition to Chapayevo, in Oktyomsky Rural Okrug of Khangalassky District in the Sakha Republic, Russia. It is located 35 kilometers (22 mi) from Pokrovsk, the administrative center of the district. Its population as of the 2002 Census was 1,552.
