= Isit, Russia =

Isit Исит
- Selo
- Interactive map of Isit
- Location of Isit Isit (Sakha Republic)
- Coordinates: 60°48′40″N 125°19′36″E
- Country: Russia
- Federal subject: Sakha Republic
- Administrative district: Khangalassky District
- Rural okrugSelsoviet: Isitsky Rural Okrug
- Elevation: 138 m (453 ft)

Population
  - Estimate (2002): 374 )

Administrative status
  - Capital of: Isitsky Rural Okrug

Municipal status
  - Municipal district: Khangalassky Municipal District
  - Rural settlement: Isitsky Rural Settlement
  - Capital of: Isitsky Rural Settlement
- Time zone: UTC+
- Postal code: 678028
- OKTMO ID: 98644412101

Isit (Russian: Исит; Yakut: Иһит, İhit) is a rural locality (a selo), the administrative centre of and one of two settlements, in addition to Nokhoroy, in Isitsky Rural Okrug of Khangalassky District in the Sakha Republic, Russia. It is located 256 kilometers (159 mi) from Pokrovsk, the administrative center of the district. Its population as of the 2002 Census was 374.

== Climate ==
Isit has a subarctic climate (Köppen climate classification Dfc). Winters are very cold with average temperatures from −39 °C (−38 °F) to −32 °C (−26 °F) in January, while summers are mild with average temperatures from 11 °C (52 °F) to 24 °C (75 °F) in July. Precipitation is quite low, but is significantly higher in summer than at other times of the year.

Climate data for Isit
Month	Jan	Feb	Mar	Apr	May	Jun	Jul	Aug	Sep	Oct	Nov	Dec	Year
Record high °C (°F)	2.0 (35.6)	−0.4 (31.3)	10.5 (50.9)	18.0 (64.4)	28.8 (83.8)	34.6 (94.3)	36.6 (97.9)	36.3 (97.3)	31.7 (89.1)	18.8 (65.8)	5.2 (41.4)	1.3 (34.3)	36.6 (97.9)
Mean daily maximum °C (°F)	−31.4 (−24.5)	−26.4 (−15.5)	−12.3 (9.9)	1.9 (35.4)	12.6 (54.7)	21.7 (71.1)	24.7 (76.5)	21.2 (70.2)	11.9 (53.4)	−1.4 (29.5)	−19.6 (−3.3)	−29.4 (−20.9)	−2.2 (28.0)
Daily mean °C (°F)	−35.0 (−31.0)	−31.3 (−24.3)	−20.0 (−4.0)	−5.5 (22.1)	6.1 (43.0)	14.6 (58.3)	18.0 (64.4)	14.6 (58.3)	6.4 (43.5)	−5.4 (22.3)	−23.4 (−10.1)	−33.1 (−27.6)	−7.8 (17.9)
Mean daily minimum °C (°F)	−38.6 (−37.5)	−35.8 (−32.4)	−27.0 (−16.6)	−12.6 (9.3)	0.4 (32.7)	8.2 (46.8)	11.7 (53.1)	8.8 (47.8)	1.8 (35.2)	−9.2 (15.4)	−27.2 (−17.0)	−36.7 (−34.1)	−13.0 (8.6)
Record low °C (°F)	−54.4 (−65.9)	−53.3 (−63.9)	−47.6 (−53.7)	−35.9 (−32.6)	−17.0 (1.4)	−4.1 (24.6)	−1.7 (28.9)	−4.9 (23.2)	−14.0 (6.8)	−34.8 (−30.6)	−47.8 (−54.0)	−54.9 (−66.8)	−54.9 (−66.8)
Average precipitation mm (inches)	12.2 (0.48)	8.0 (0.31)	7.8 (0.31)	9.9 (0.39)	25.7 (1.01)	42.8 (1.69)	52.7 (2.07)	53.6 (2.11)	34.4 (1.35)	19.1 (0.75)	16.2 (0.64)	13.3 (0.52)	295.7 (11.63)
Average precipitation days (≥ 0.1 mm)	18.6	14.9	12.5	9.2	9.3	8.3	7.3	10.0	13.2	18.4	20.3	18.5	160.5
Average relative humidity (%)	75.5	74.7	71.2	63.0	61.2	65.5	71.1	77.0	74.8	75.4	77.7	75.1	71.9
Mean monthly sunshine hours	58	139	206	236	285	303	319	233	147	87	60	26	2,099
Source 1: climatebase.ru (1936-2012)
Source 2: NOAA (sun only, 1961-1990)
