= Menda =

Menda may refer to:

- Menda (Chalcidice), town of ancient Chalcidice, Greece
- Menda, Kumamoto, a village in Japan
- Menda (river), a tributary of the Lena
- Sakae Menda (1925–2020), Japanese exonerated defendant
- Menda (moth), a genus of moths in subfamily Epipleminae
