= Tumul, Khangalassky District, Sakha Republic =

Tumul Тумул
- Selo
- Interactive map of Tumul
- Location of Tumul Tumul (Sakha Republic)
- Coordinates: 61°10′50″N 127°31′55″E
- Country: Russia
- Federal subject: Sakha Republic
- Administrative district: Khangalassky District
- Rural okrugSelsoviet: Tumulsky Rural Okrug

Population (2010 Census)
  - Total: 239
  - Estimate (2021): 228 (−4.6%)

Administrative status
  - Capital of: Tumulsky Rural Okrug

Municipal status
  - Municipal district: Khangalassky Municipal District
  - Rural settlement: Tumulsky Rural Settlement
  - Capital of: Tumulsky Rural Settlement
- Time zone: UTC+
- Postal code: 678024
- OKTMO ID: 98644453101

Tumul (Russian: Тумул; Yakut: Тумул) is a rural locality (a selo), the only inhabited locality, and the administrative center of Tumulsky Rural Okrug of Khangalassky District in the Sakha Republic, Russia, located 117 kilometers (73 mi) from Pokrovsk, the administrative center of the district. Its population as of the 2010 Census was 239, down from 266 recorded during the 2002 Census.
