= Charang, Khangalassky District, Sakha Republic =

Charang Чаранг
- Selo
- Interactive map of Charang
- Location of Charang Charang (Sakha Republic)
- Coordinates: 61°25′29″N 128°46′41″E
- Country: Russia
- Federal subject: Sakha Republic
- Administrative district: Khangalassky District
- Rural okrugSelsoviet: Bestyakhsky Rural Okrug (Khangalassky District)

Population
  - Estimate (2002): 83 )

Municipal status
  - Municipal district: Khangalassky Municipal District
  - Rural settlement: Bestyakhsky Rural Settlement
- Time zone: UTC+
- Postal code: 678024
- OKTMO ID: 98644403106

Charang (Russian: Чаранг; Yakut: Чараҥ, Çaraŋ) is a rural locality (a selo), one of two settlements, in addition to Bestyakh, in Bestyakhsky Rural Okrug of Khangalassky District in the Sakha Republic, Russia. It is located 49 kilometers (30 mi) from Pokrovsk, the administrative center of the district and 9 kilometers (5.6 mi) from Bestyakh. Its population as of the 2002 Census was 83.
