= Yakutsk electoral district =

Constituency of the Russian Republic

Yakutsk
- Former Civilian constituency for the All-Russian Constituent Assembly
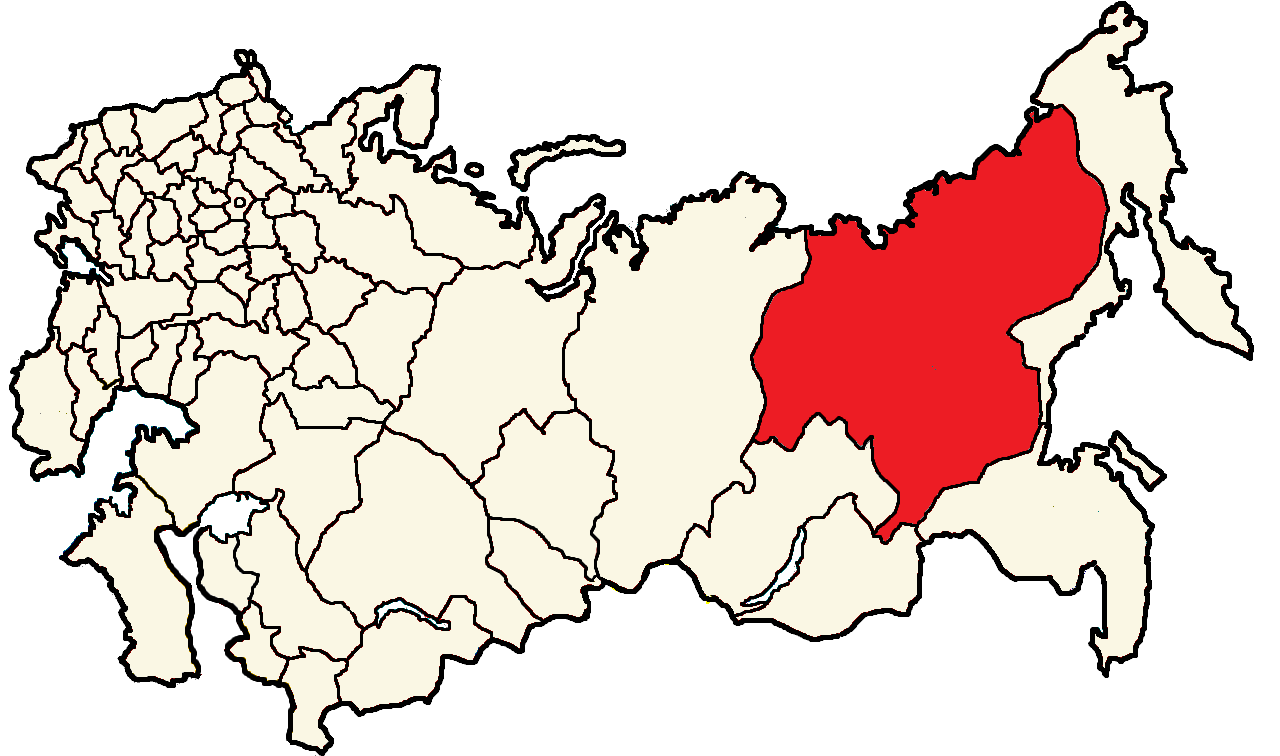

Former constituency
- Created: 1917
- Abolished: 1918
- Number of members: 2
- Number of Uyezd Electoral Commissions: 5
- Number of Urban Electoral Commissions: 1
- Number of Parishes: 47

The Yakutsk electoral district (Russian: Якутский избирательный округ) was a constituency created for the 1917 Russian Constituent Assembly election. The electoral district covered the Yakutsk Oblast. Four candidate lists were in the fray; List 1 - Yakutian Labour Union of Federalists, List 2 - Socialist-Revolutionaries, List 3 - Mensheviks and List 4 - Kadets.

The Mensheviks fielded M. T. Popov as their candidate, the Kadets D. A. Kochnev, G. V. Ksenofontov stood as the federalist candidate and V. S. Pankratov was fielded by the Socialist-Revolutionaries. As of May 1917 the Menshevik centre had sent M. T. Popov, from the Agitation and Literary Section of the Petrograd Soviet to Yakutsk. Popov was a noted for his rhetorical skills.

== Results ==
Yakutsk
Party	Vote	%	Seats
List 1 - Yakutian Labour Union of Federalists	1,541	43.02	1
List 2 - Socialist-Revolutionaries	1,208	33.72	1
List 4 - Kadets	586	16.36	
List 3 - Mensheviks	247	6.90	
Total:	3,582		2

Deputies Elected
Xenophonov	Federal Labour Union
Pankratov	SR
