= Tygyn Darkhan =

Yakut chief and hero

Tygyn Darkhan (Yakut: Тыгын Дархан, romanized: Tıgın Darxan; Russian: Тыгын (Дыгын) Дархан, Тынин; ?–1632) was a legendary Yakut hero and the subject of many tales, a chief of the Kangalas ulus (clan), the king of the Yakuts.

== History ==
According to Yakut legend, Tygyn was a descendant of Badzhei (Yakut: Бадьы, romanized: Bacı), who was also known in Yakut legends in the 19th-20th centuries as "Doidusa Darkhan" (Yakut: Дойдуса Дархан, romanized: Doydusa Darxan) or "Tyusyulge Darkhaan" (Russian: Тюсюлге Дархан). Tyusyulge had two sons, Munn'an Darkhan (Yakut: Мунньан Дархан, romanized: Munņan Darxan) and Mold'ogor (Yakut: Молдьогор, romanized: Molcoğor). Munn'an Darkhan had two sons of his own, Tygyn and Usun Oyuun (Yakut: Усун Ойуун, romanized: Usun Oyûn).

Tygyn was renowned for his tall height in Yakut legends. When Tygyn succeeded his father, Tyusyulge, as Toyon-usa (Chief King) he unified the other Yakut clans into a single nation or state and became a wealthy landowner who lived around Lake Saysara. However, when his armies faced the newly arrived Russians in 1628, they were defeated by the latter's firearms, and the Russian army captured Tygyn and held him as a prisoner. After suffering from a poor skin condition, he died in prison in 1632.

His son Bedzheke was captured and placed into prison in his father's place, while another son, Ökrey, succeeded his father Tygyn as the next Toyon-usa of the Yakuts.
