= Yakutian Labour Union of Federalists =

Yakut Labour Union of Federalists
- Leader: Vasilii V. Nikiforov; Gavriil V. Ksenofontov
- Secretary: Roman Ivanovich Orosin
- Founded: June 27, 1917
- Dissolved: 1919
- Ideology: Regionalism; Federalism; Parliamentary republicanism; Women's Suffrage; Yakut interests

The Yakut Labour Union of Federalists (Note: Russian: Якутский трудовой союз федералистов; Yakut: Саха федералистарын үлэһит сойууһа) (YLUF), also known as the Union of Federalists, was a Yakut political party founded by Yakut intellectuals to represent the Yakut people. The Union was founded on June 27, 1917, initially having four hundred members. The party promoted federalism, equal rights for all, and civil liberties for all, while also advocating for local self-government primarily through zemstvos. By late 1917, it had grown to 1,198 members and gained political representation in Siberia and Russia, but ceased operations in 1919 after the Bolsheviks took control of the region.

== History ==
In May 1914, several issues of the newspaper “Yakutskaya okraina” published articles by Gavriil V. Ksenofontov, which raised important issues about improving school education and teaching Yakut children their native language. In the article, Ksenofontov argued that Yakut children would learn better if they were educated in their native language instead of Russian. But to do this they would need to create a Yakut language primer and dictionary, which would be difficult but completely achievable. The article proved to be very topical and received support from several important members of Yakut Society from the time, such as Semyon Novgorodov, Vasilii V. Nikiforov, who was an important intellectual, and Prokopiy N. Sokolnikov, who was an important doctor.

Before World War I, the Yakut nationalist intelligentsia began to collaborate more closely in their discussions of the problems facing Yakut social and political life, and this culminated in the creation, of the "Yakut Questions" (Russian: Yakutskiye Voprosy) newspaper in July 1916 by Nikiforov. Many young Yakut intellectuals, including, Ksenofontov, were brought together into the newspaper because Nikiforov (who was already fifty years old) began to think about how the movement would live on after his death, and wanted to encourage a new generation of Yakut nationalists. Ksenofontov quickly distinguished himself as the most capable of these younger members.

The creation of the YLUF was scheduled for June 1917 at the 2nd Congress of Yakuts and Russian Peasants, but most of the members of the "freedom union" who would've created the party were unavailable due to being busy with agricultural work and as such a constituent congress was gathered on June 27, 1917 with the event's most important outcome being the creation of the "Yakut Labour Union of Federalists" party. At the party's creation it had four hundred members including important members of Yakut politics and intelligentsia. The party was led by a nine-man central committee whose exact membership records have not survived. It is known that in practice the party was primarily ran by Nikiforov and Ksenofontov; while not holding any official position within the party, they were heading or were part of other important Yakut organizations which gave them de facto control of the party. Other important figures included Alexei Dmitrievich Shirokih who was an active party member and skilled organizer who was elected chairman of the central committee; and Roman Ivanovich Orosin, an active figure in Yakut Nationalist politics who was elected secretary of the central committee. The party quickly grew and by November 1917 had 1,198 members and nineteen committees.

In their program, the federalists support the equal rights of all Russian citizens regardless of religion, gender, class, or other differences. They called for legal inviolability of the person and home, freedom of religion, freedom of speech, freedom of the press, freedom of assembly, and the right to strike. They also wanted protection and support for the previously oppressed peoples of Russia.

The party allocated much of its resources and effort to the development of local government by utilizing the zemstvos. Zemstvos first began to form in Yakutia at the end of 1917, and Nikiforov was the head of the Yakut regional zemstvo created in January 1918.

The party received 1,541 votes (43.02%) in the Yakutsk Electoral District in the 1917 Russian Constituent Assembly election, and Ksenofontov was elected to one of the district's two seats, but due to instability, he was unable to actually attend the Constituent Assembly. Ksenofontov also served as the YLUF's representative in the Siberian Regional Duma and as the representative in the Provisional Siberian Government for the party.

The party ceased to operate in 1919 after the Bolsheviks seized power in the region.
