= Bestyakh, Khangalassky District, Sakha Republic =

Bestyakh Бестях
- Selo
- Interactive map of Bestyakh
- Location of Bestyakh Bestyakh (Sakha Republic)
- Coordinates: 61°22′07″N 128°52′23″E
- Country: Russia
- Federal subject: Sakha Republic
- Administrative district: Khangalassky District
- Rural okrugSelsoviet: Bestyakhsky Rural Okrug (Khangalassky District)

Population
  - Estimate (2002): 2,249 )

Administrative status
  - Capital of: Bestyakhsky Rural Okrug (Khangalassky District)

Municipal status
  - Municipal district: Khangalassky Municipal District
  - Rural settlement: Bestyakhsky Rural Settlement
  - Capital of: Bestyakhsky Rural Settlement
- Time zone: UTC+
- OKTMO ID: 98644403101

Bestyakh (Russian: Бестях; Yakut: Бэстээх, Besteex) is a rural locality (a selo), the administrative centre of and one of two settlements, in addition to Charang, in Bestyakhsky Rural Okrug of Khangalassky District in the Sakha Republic, Russia. It is located 40 kilometers (25 mi) from Pokrovsk, the administrative center of the district. Its population as of the 2002 Census was 2,249.
