= Kachikattsy =

Kachikattsy Качикатцы
- Selo
- Interactive map of Kachikattsy
- Location of Kachikattsy Kachikattsy (Sakha Republic)
- Coordinates: 61°19′15″N 128°57′24″E
- Country: Russia
- Federal subject: Sakha Republic
- Administrative district: Khangalassky District
- Rural okrugSelsoviet: Kachikatsky Rural Okrug

Population
  - Estimate (2002): 1,184 )

Administrative status
  - Capital of: Kachikatsky Rural Okrug

Municipal status
  - Municipal district: Khangalassky Municipal District
  - Rural settlement: Kachikatsky Rural Settlement
  - Capital of: Kachikatsky Rural Settlement
- Time zone: UTC+
- Postal codes: 678005, 678006
- OKTMO ID: 98644418101

Kachikattsy (Russian: Качикатцы; Yakut: Хачыкаат, romanized: Xaçıkaat) is a rural locality (a selo) and the administrative center of Kachikatsky Rural Okrug in Khangalassky District of the Sakha Republic, Russia, 27 kilometers (17 mi) from Pokrovsk, the administrative center of the district. Its population as of the 2002 Census was 1,184.
