= Tit-Ary, Khangalassky District, Sakha Republic =

Tit-Ary Тит-Ары
- Selo
- Interactive map of Tit-Ary
- Location of Tit-Ary Tit-Ary (Sakha Republic)
- Coordinates: 61°13′44″N 127°49′11″E
- Country: Russia
- Federal subject: Sakha Republic
- Administrative district: Khangalassky District
- Rural okrugSelsoviet: Tit-Arinsky Rural Okrug
- Elevation: 84 m (276 ft)

Population
  - Estimate (2002): 418 )

Administrative status
  - Capital of: Tit-Arinsky Rural Okrug

Municipal status
  - Municipal district: Khangalassky Municipal District
  - Rural settlement: Tit-Arinsky Rural Settlement
  - Capital of: Tit-Arinsky Rural Settlement
- Time zone: UTC+
- Postal code: 678024
- OKTMO ID: 98644450101

Tit-Ary (Russian: Тит-Ары; Yakut: Тиит Арыы, Tiit Arıı) is a rural locality (a selo), the administrative centre of and one of three settlements, in addition to Kharyyalakh and Chkalov, in Tit-Arinsky Rural Okrug of Khangalassky District in the Sakha Republic, Russia. It is located 105 kilometers (65 mi) from Pokrovsk, the administrative center of the district. Its population as of the 2002 Census was 418.
