= Tit-Ary =

Tit-Ary (Russian: Тит-Ары) is the name of several rural localities in the Sakha Republic, Russia:

- Tit-Ary, Khangalassky District, Sakha Republic, a selo in Tit-Arynsky Rural Okrug of Khangalassky District
- Tit-Ary, Ust-Aldansky District, Sakha Republic, a selo in Tit-Arynsky Rural Okrug of Ust-Aldansky District
