= Lena Pillars =

Lena Pillars Nature Park
UNESCO World Heritage Site
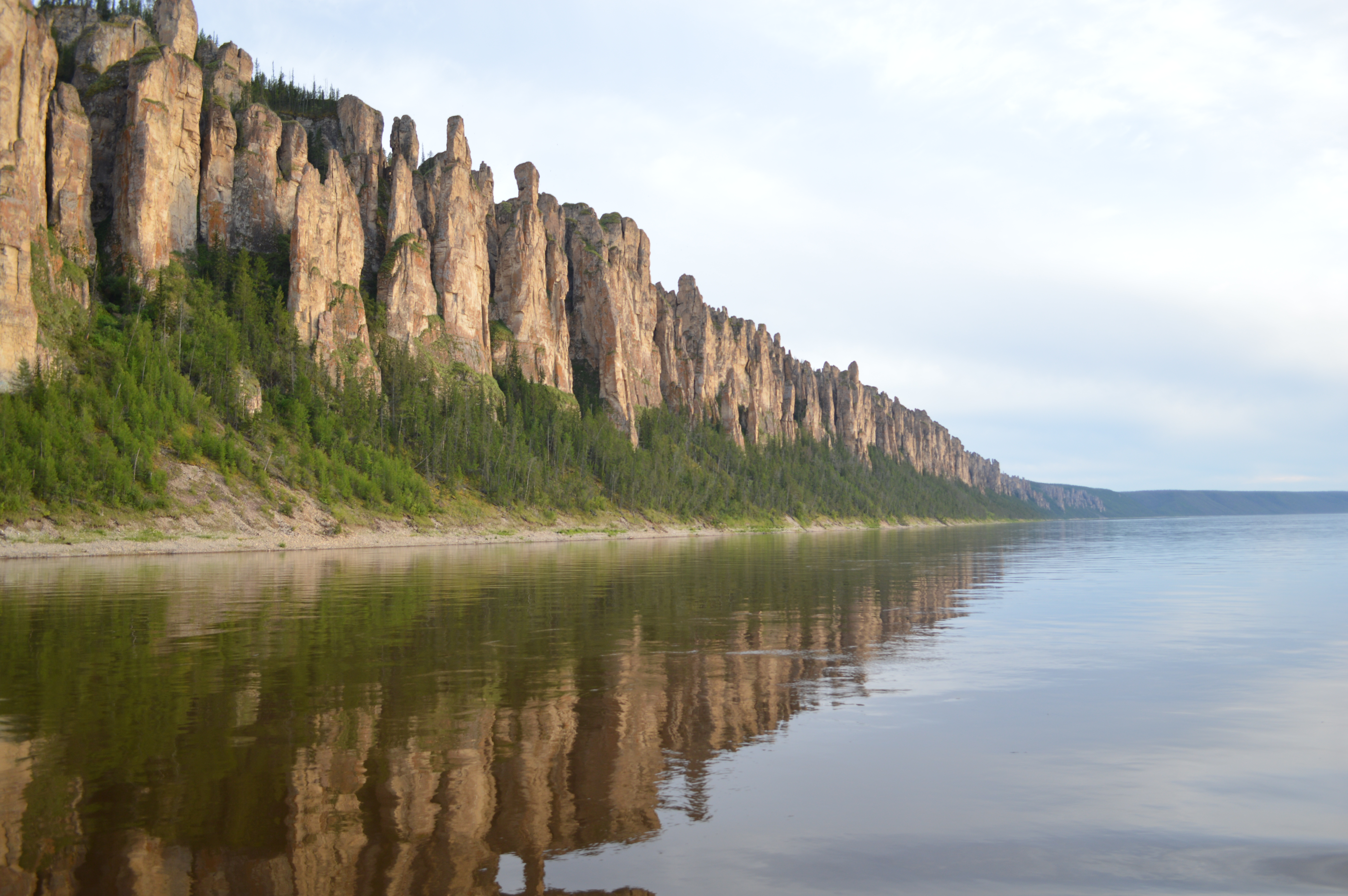
- The pillars seen from a river cruise boat.

- Location within Russia
- Location: Sakha Republic, Russia
- Includes: 1. Buotamsky plot 2. Sinsky plot
- Criteria: Natural: (viii)
- Reference: 1299bis
- Inscription: 2012 (36th Session)
- Extensions: 2015
- Area: 1,387,000 ha (3,430,000 acres)
- Coordinates: 61°08′46″N 127°35′05″E

The Lena Pillars (Russian: Ле́нские столбы́, romanized: Lenskiye Stolby; Yakut: Өлүөнэ туруук хайалара, Ölüöne Turūk Khayalara) are a natural rock formation along the banks of the Lena River in far eastern Siberia. The pillars are 150–300 metres (490–980 ft) high, and were formed in some of the Cambrian period sea-basins. The highest density of pillars is reached between the villages of Petrovskoye and Tit-Ary. The Lena Pillars Nature Park was inscribed on the World Heritage List in 2012.

The site lies around 180 kilometres (110 mi) (less than a day's boat ride) from the city of Yakutsk, the capital of the autonomous Sakha Republic.

== Tourism ==
River cruises can be arranged through travel services in the city of Yakutsk. Visitors interested in limnology or ecotourism, including those who also visit Lake Baikal, may organise a river trip with the assistance of a guide from the Lake Baikal region; Yakutsk, from where the river cruises originate, is approximately 1,400 kilometres (870 mi) northeast of Lake Baikal.

Few modern amenities exist in this part of Russia, unless one travels by cruise ship on the Lena River. Tit-Ary on the opposite side of the river is connected to Yakutsk by a gravel road.

Hiking trails in the region are steep and can be precarious at times.

== Geology ==
The pillars consist of alternating layers of limestone, marlstone, dolomite and slate of early to middle Cambrian age, which are weathered, producing the rugged outcrops.

These types of rocks are commonly formed in marine environments and the horizontal layering and vertical variation indicates marine transgression/regression; with the slate representing the deep marine, slightly metamorphosed shales.

== Climate ==
The climate is acutely continental with temperatures reaching as low as -60 °C in winter and as high as +35 °C in summer.

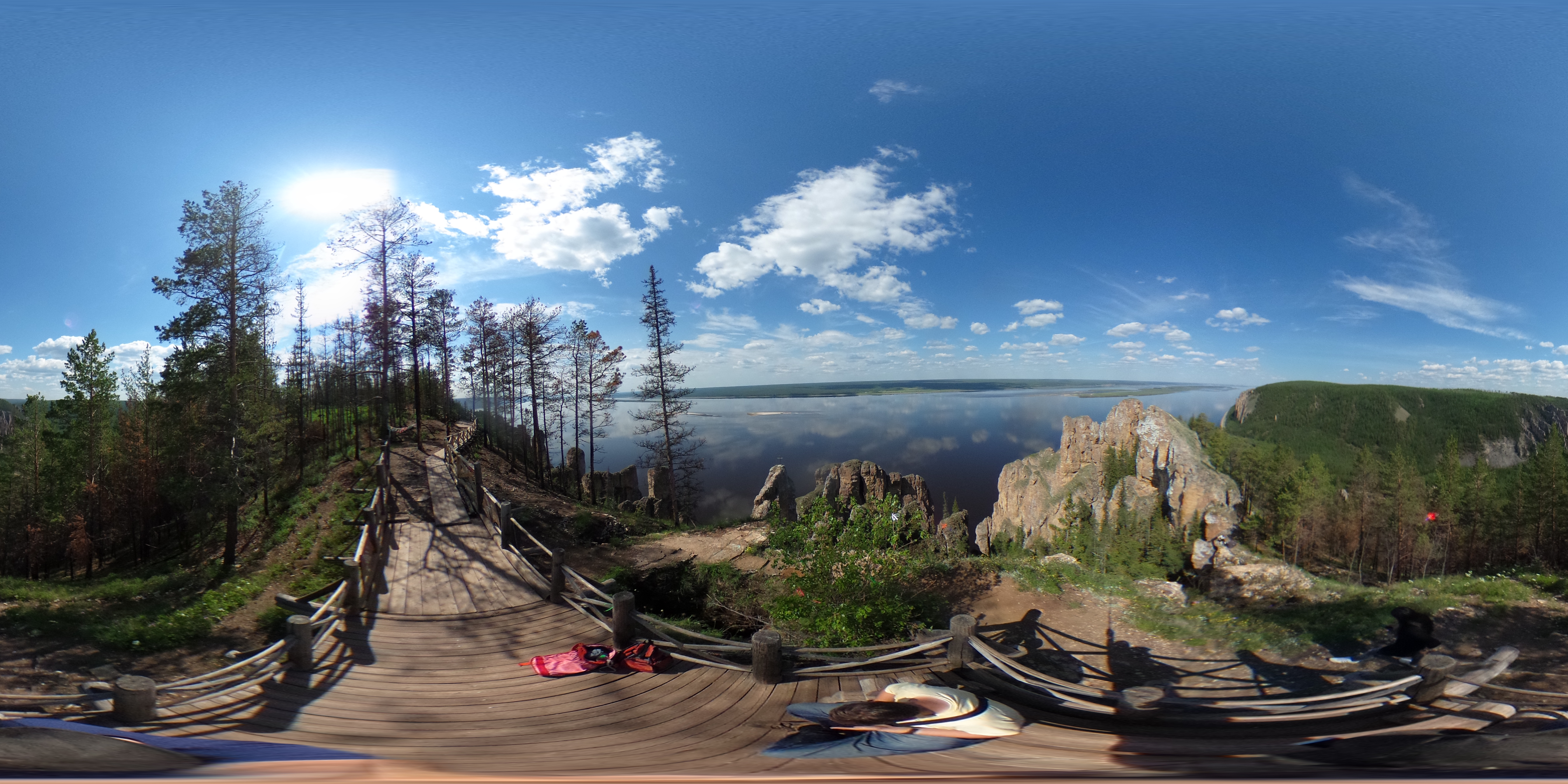
View from viewpoint (June) (view as a 360° interactive panorama)

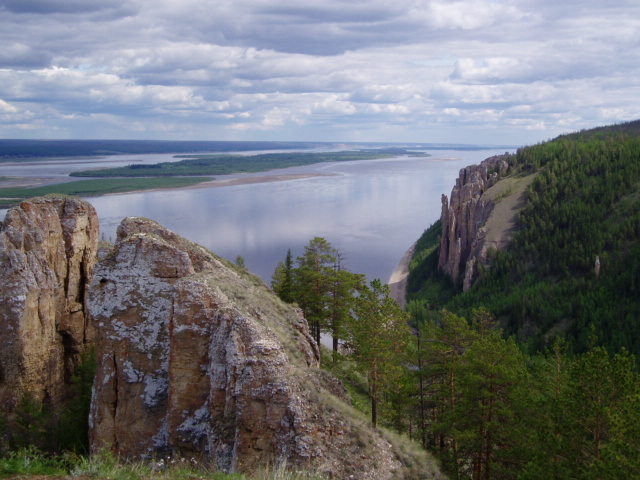

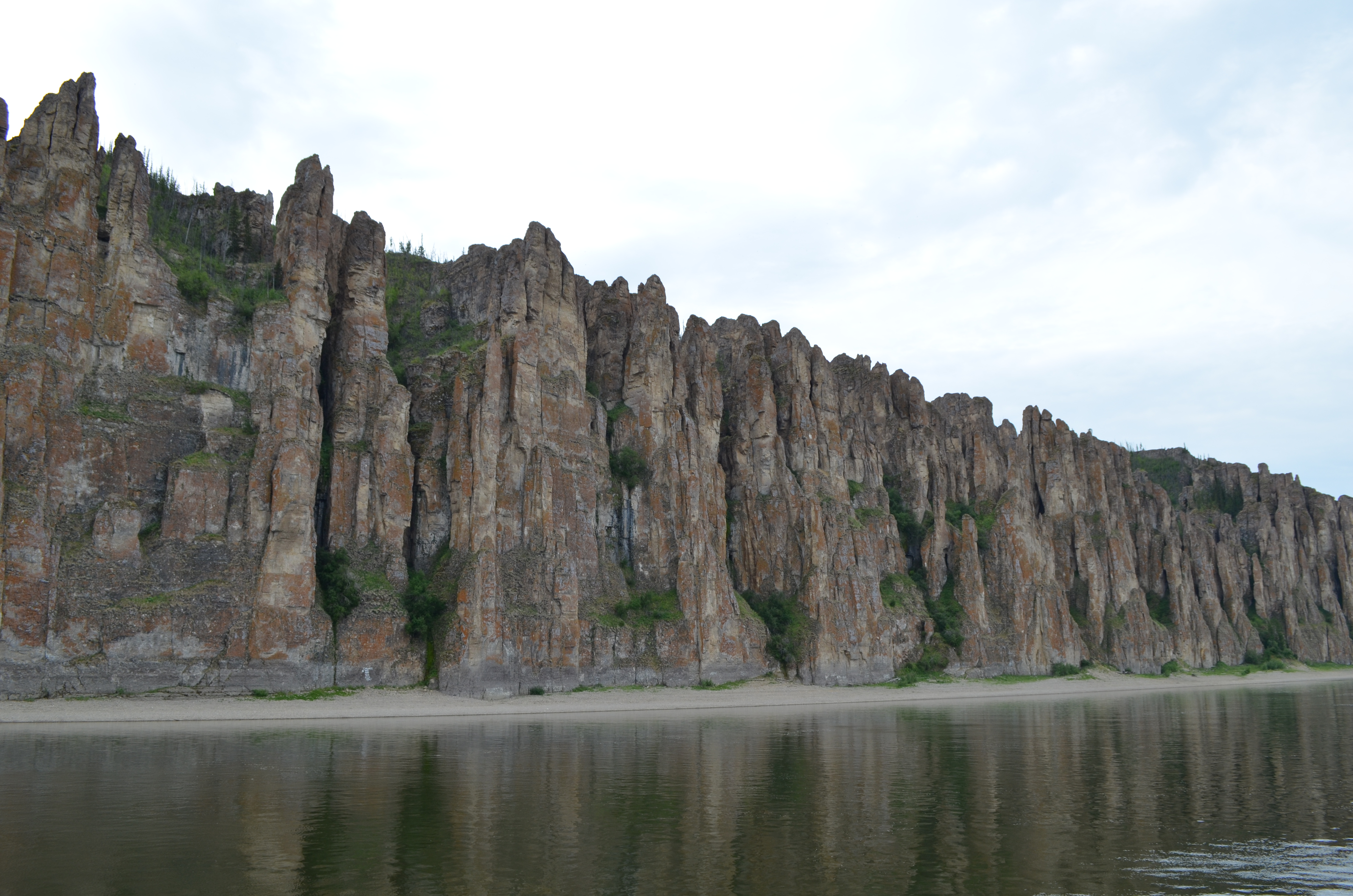

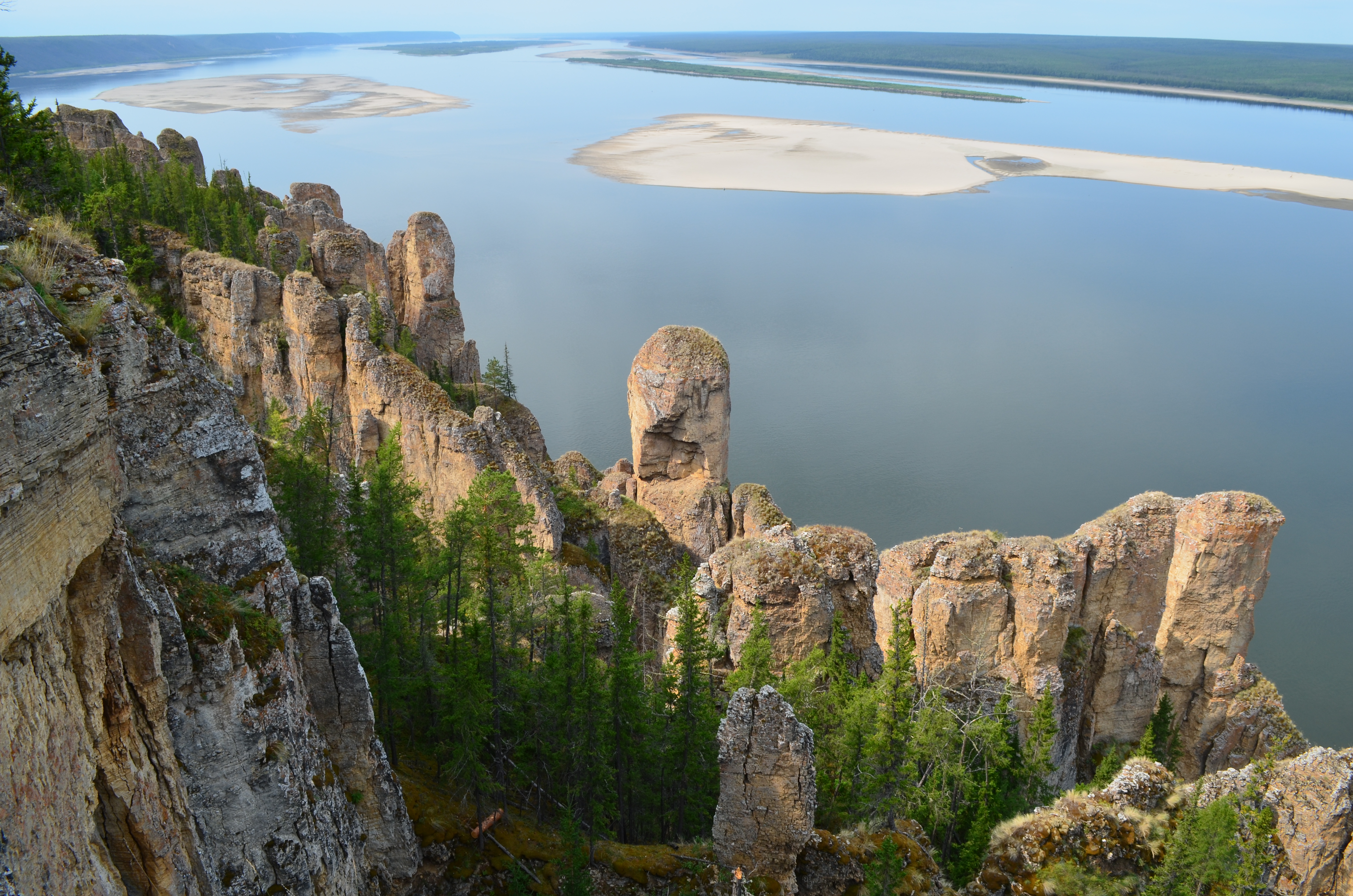

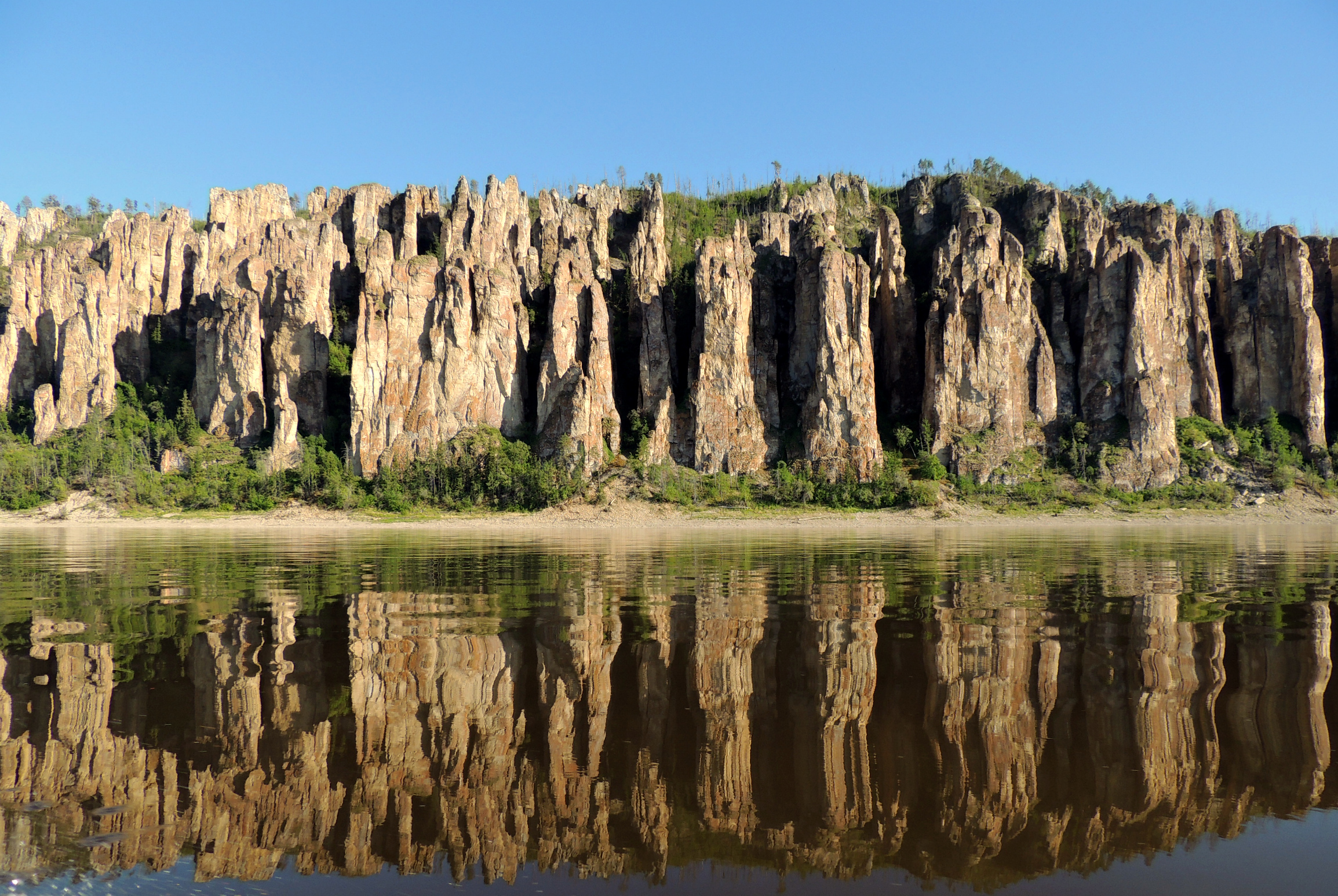

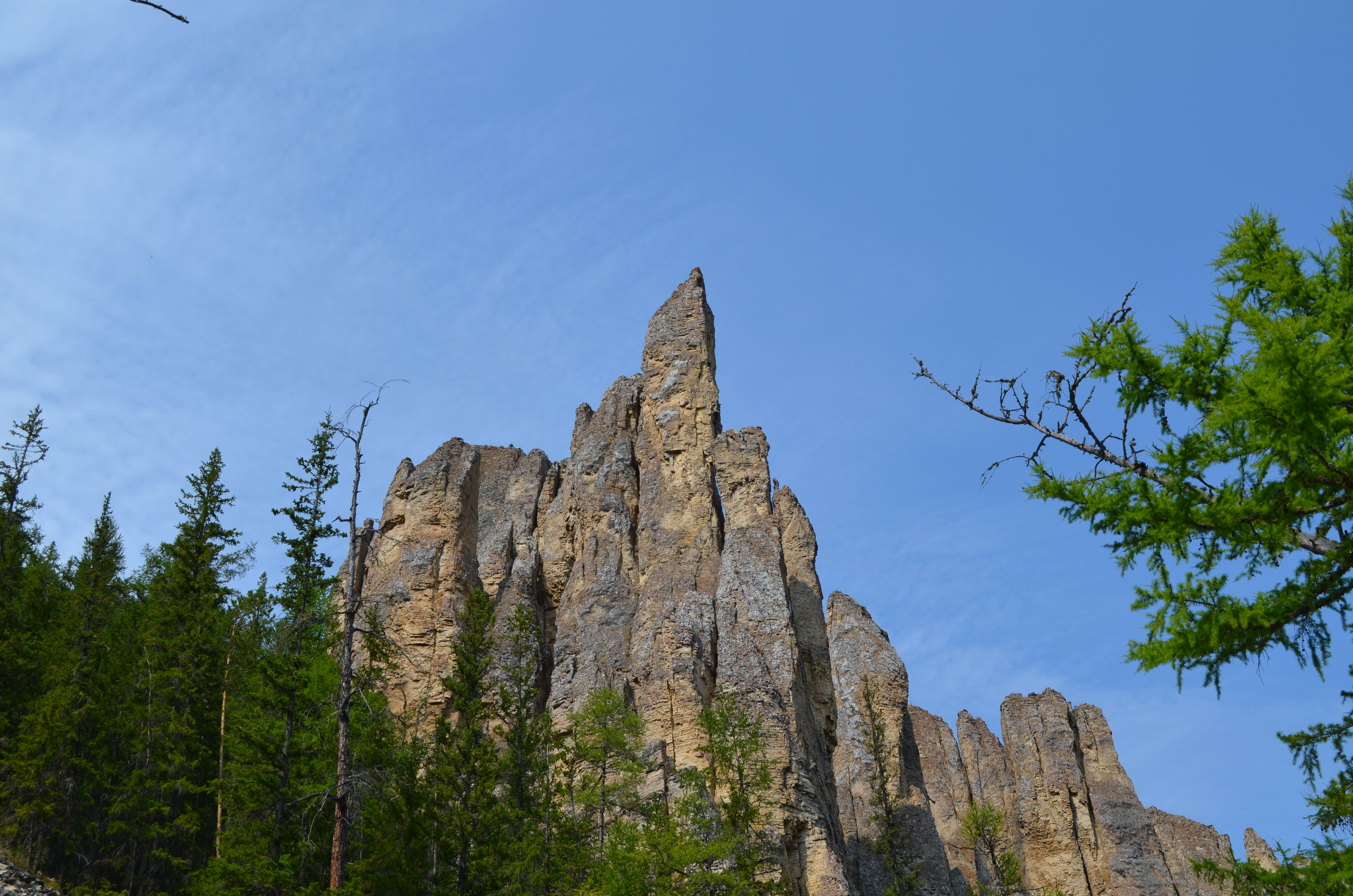

== See also ==
- Krasnoyarsk Pillars
- Lena Cheeks
- Lena Plateau
