= Bulgunnyakhtakh =

Bulgunnyakhtakh Булгунняхтах
- Selo
- Interactive map of Bulgunnyakhtakh
- Location of Bulgunnyakhtakh Bulgunnyakhtakh (Sakha Republic)
- Coordinates: 61°18′N 128°40′E
- Country: Russia
- Federal subject: Sakha Republic
- Administrative district: Khangalassky District
- Rural okrugSelsoviet: Malzhagarsky 1-y Rural Okrug
- Elevation: 133 m (436 ft)

Population (2010 Census)
  - Total: 1,529
  - Estimate (2021): 1,529 (0%)

Administrative status
  - Capital of: Malzhagarsky 1-y Rural Okrug

Municipal status
  - Municipal district: Khangalassky Municipal District
  - Rural settlement: Malzhagarsky 1-y Rural Settlement
  - Capital of: Malzhagarsky 1-y Rural Settlement
- Time zone: UTC+
- Postal code: 678022
- OKTMO ID: 98644423101

Bulgunnyakhtakh (Russian: Булгунняхтах; Yakut: Булгунньахтаах, Bulgunñaxtaax) is a rural locality (a selo) and the administrative center of Malzhagarsky 1-y Rural Okrug of Khangalassky District in the Sakha Republic, Russia, located 38 kilometers (24 mi) from Pokrovsk, the administrative center of the district. Its population as of the 2010 Census was 1,529; down from 1,601 recorded in the 2002 Census.
