= Bestyakhsky Rural Okrug (Khangalassky District) =

Rural okrug in Khangalassky District, Sakha Republic, Russia

Bestyakhsky Rural Okrug is a rural okrug (administrative division) of Khangalassky District in the Sakha Republic, Russia. It contains just two settlements: Bestyakh (its administrative center) and Charang.
