= Kerdyom =

Kerdyom Кердём
- Selo
- Interactive map of Kerdyom
- Location of Kerdyom Kerdyom (Sakha Republic)
- Coordinates: 61°26′N 129°12′E
- Country: Russia
- Federal subject: Sakha Republic
- Administrative district: Khangalassky District
- Rural okrugSelsoviet: Zhemkonsky 2-y Rural Okrug

Population (2010 Census)
  - Total: 1,015
  - Estimate (2021): 877 (−13.6%)

Administrative status
  - Capital of: Zhemkonsky 2-y Rural Okrug

Municipal status
  - Municipal district: Khangalassky Municipal District
  - Rural settlement: Zhemkonsky 2-y Rural Settlement
  - Capital of: Zhemkonsky 2-y Rural Settlement
- Time zone: UTC+
- Postal code: 678014
- OKTMO ID: 98644407101

Kerdyom (Russian: Кердём; Yakut: Күөрдэм, Küördem) is a rural locality (a selo) and the administrative center of Zhemkonsky 2-y Rural Okrug of Khangalassky District in the Sakha Republic, Russia, located 7 kilometers (4.3 mi) from Pokrovsk, the administrative center of the district. Its population as of the 2010 Census was 1,015; up from 867 recorded in the 2002 Census.

== Geography ==
Kerdyom is located by the mouth of the Lyutenge on the right bank of the Lena River.
