= Menda (river) =

River in Yakutia (Sakha Republic), Russia

Menda Менда
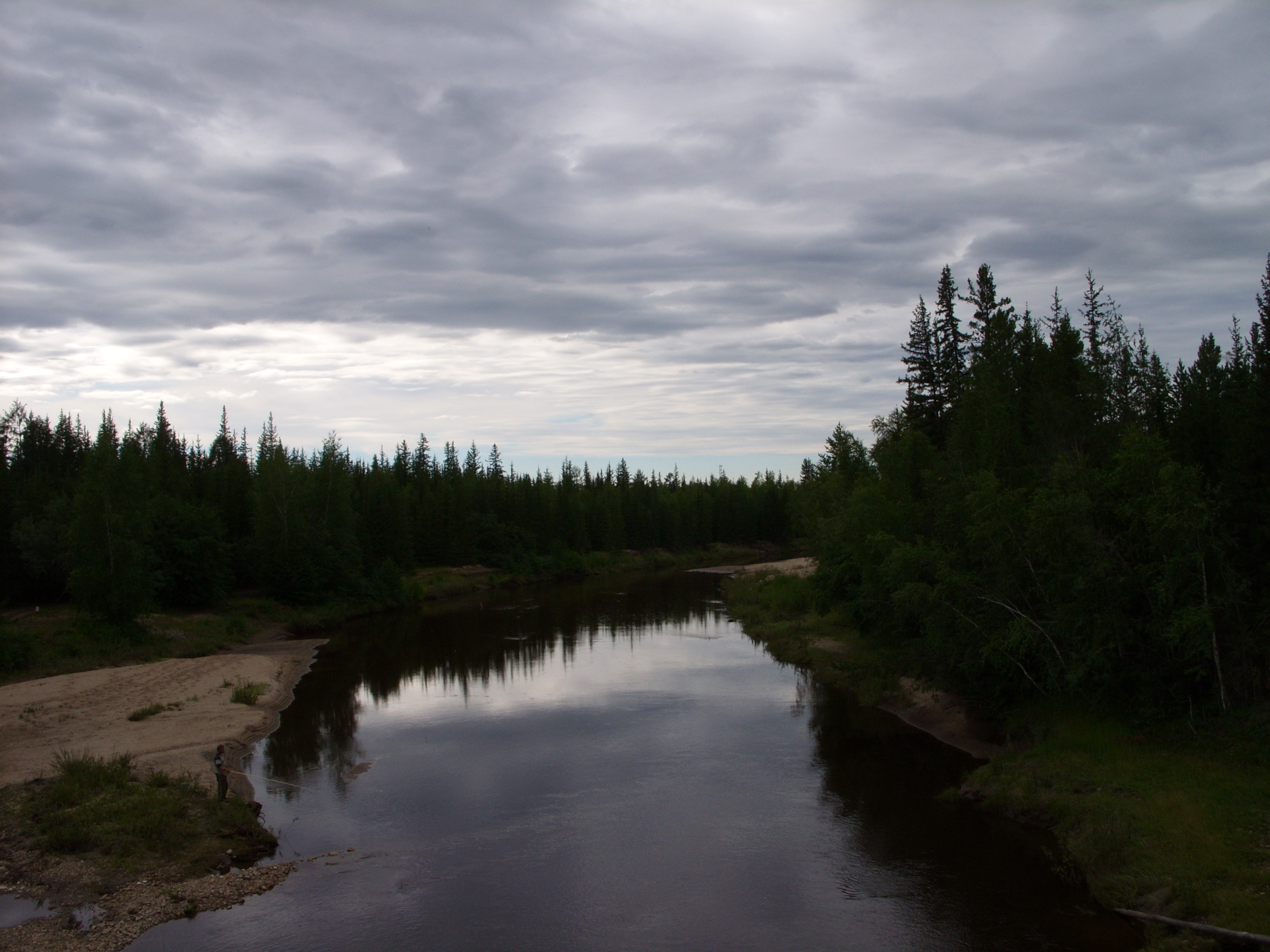
- View of the river

- Mouth location in Yakutia, Russia

Location
- Country: Russia

Physical characteristics
- Source
  - location: Lena Plateau
  - coordinates: 60°47′12″N 130°07′57″E
- Mouth: Lena
  - coordinates: 61°30′56″N 129°20′09″E
- Length: 168 km (104 mi)
- Basin size: 2,370 km^{2} (920 sq mi)

Basin features
- Progression: Lena→ Laptev Sea

The Menda (Russian: Менда; Yakut: Менда) is a river in Yakutia (Sakha Republic), Russia. It is a tributary of the Lena with a length of 168 kilometres (104 mi) and a drainage basin area of 2,370 square kilometres (920 mi^{2}).

The Menda is the second largest river of Khangalassky District. The village of Tit-Ebya is located near the mouth of the river. The Kyuyulyur waterfalls (Yakut: Күрүлүүр), a tourist attraction, are located in the Menda.

== Course ==
The Menda is a right tributary of the Lena. It is formed at the confluence of the Tala-Kyuyol and Onney-Ulur rivers in the Lena Plateau, between the Lena and the Amga. It heads in a roughly northern direction across taiga areas in its upper and middle course, parallel to the Tamma to the east. Then it bends to the northwest in its lower course, when it reaches the Lena floodplain and flows slowly among the swamps and small lakes of the area. Finally it meets the Lena 1,565 kilometres (972 mi) from its mouth north of the village of Tit-Ebya, south of Yakutsk.

The largest tributary of the Menda is the 94 kilometres (58 mi) long Dangykh that joins it from the left. In some stretches the river channel is bound by low cliffs. The Menda freezes between October and May.

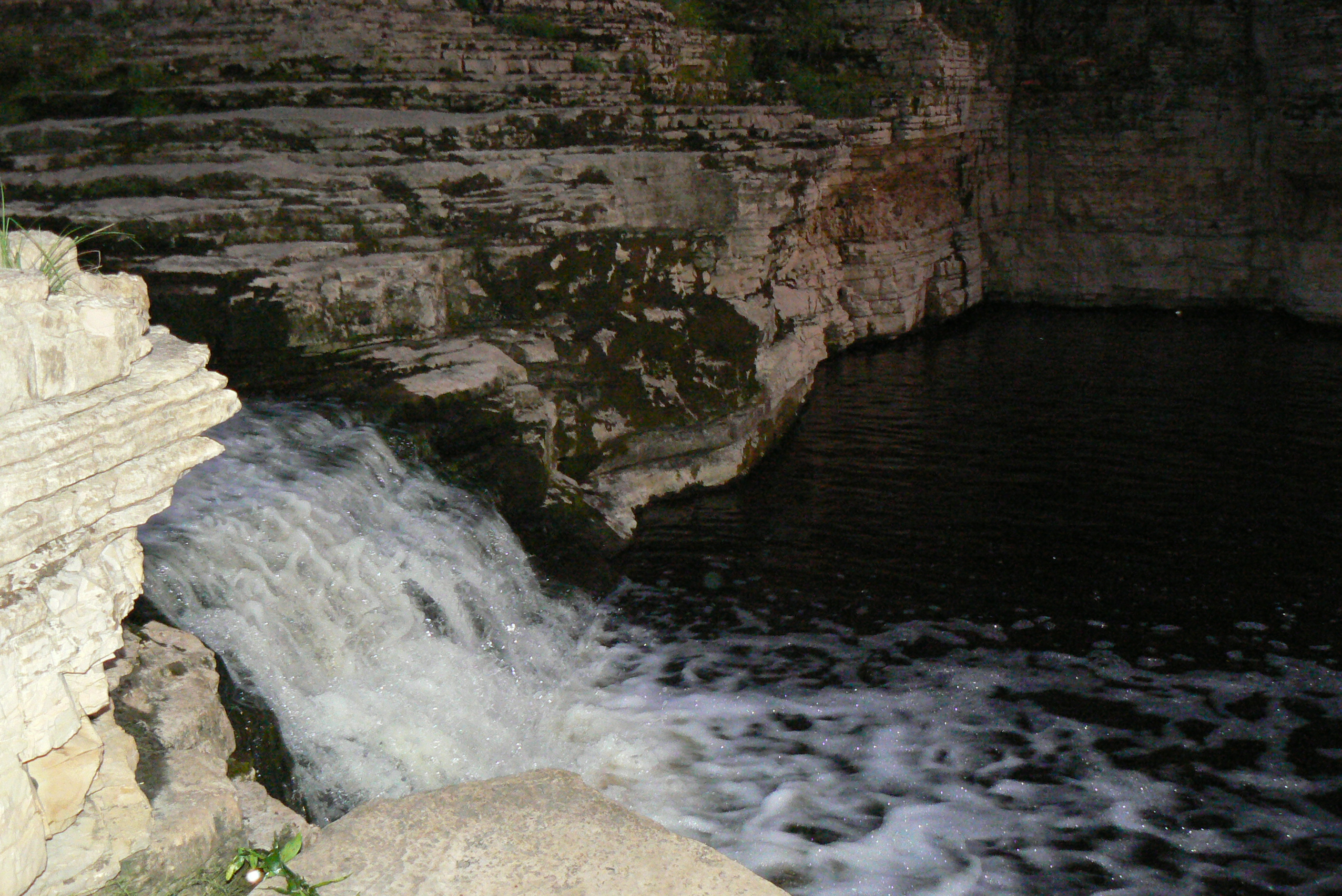
View of one of the Kyuyulyur waterfalls

== See also ==
- List of rivers of Russia
