= Khangalassky District =

Khangalassky District Хангаласский улус (Russian)
- District

Other transcription(s)
  - Sakha: Хаҥалас улууһа
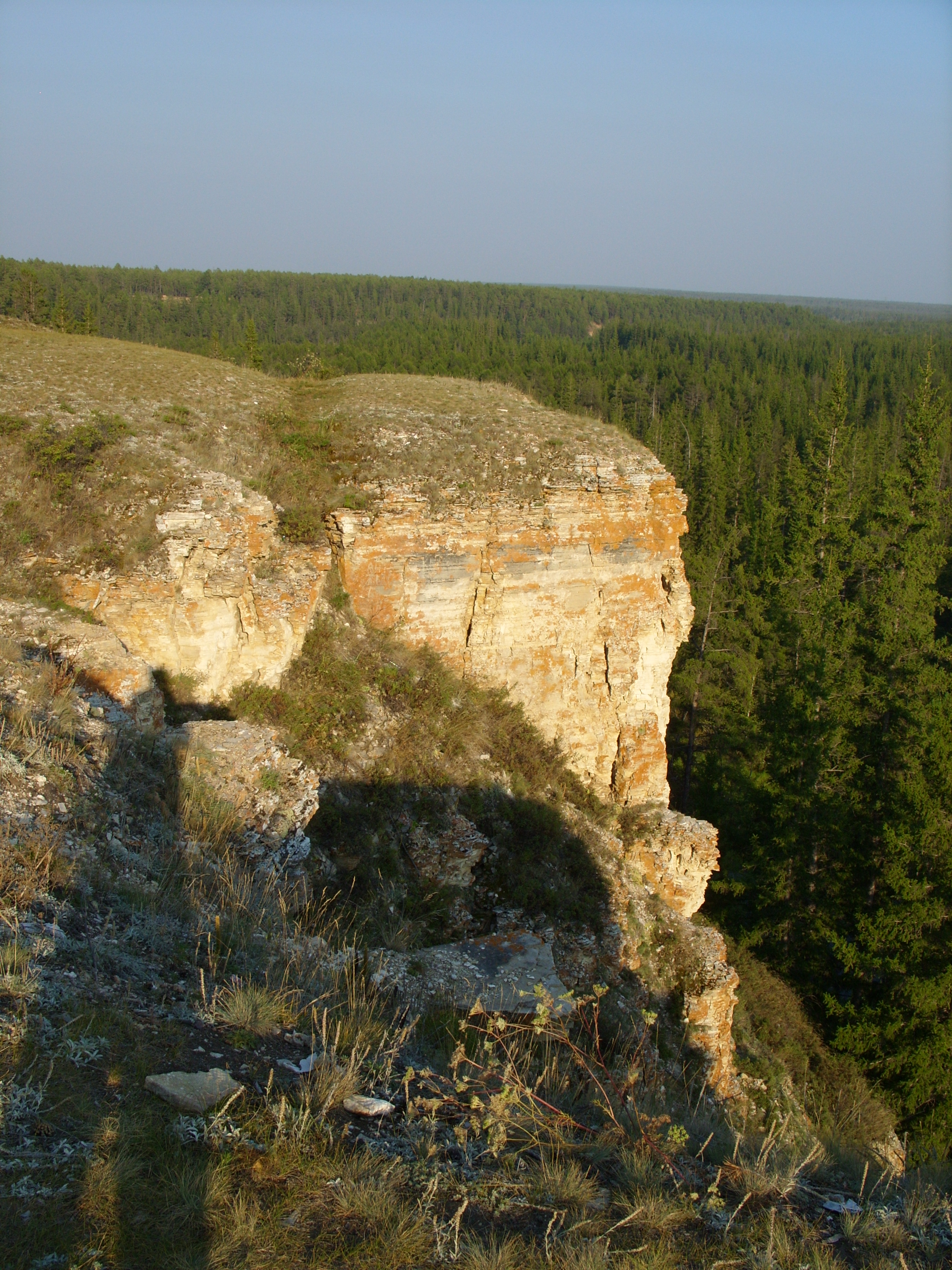
- Turuuk Khaya rocks, a protected area of Russia in Khangalassky District

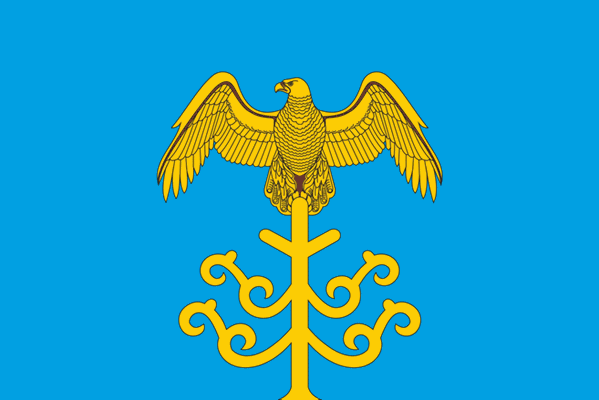
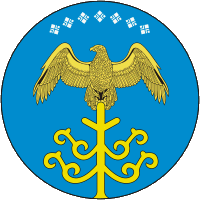
- Flag Coat of arms
- Location of Khangalassky District in the Sakha Republic
- Coordinates: 61°18′N 127°12′E
- Country: Russia
- Federal subject: Sakha Republic
- Established: February 10, 1930
- Administrative center: Pokrovsk

Area
  - Total: 24,700 km^{2} (9,500 sq mi)

Population (2010 Census)
  - Total: 24,557
  - Density: 0.994/km^{2} (2.57/sq mi)
  - Urban: 27.3%
  - Rural: 72.7%

Administrative structure
  - Administrative divisions: 1 Settlements, 16 Rural okrugs
  - Inhabited localities: 1 cities/towns, 1 urban-type settlements, 27 rural localities

Municipal structure
  - Municipally incorporated as: Khangalassky Municipal District
  - Municipal divisions: 2 urban settlements, 16 rural settlements
- Time zone: UTC+
- OKTMO ID: 98644000
- Website: https://mr-hangalasskij.sakha.gov.ru/

Khangalassky District (Russian: Хангала́сский улу́с; Yakut: Хаҥалас улууһа, romanized: Xañalas uluuha, [xaŋalas uluːha]) is an administrative and municipal district (raion, or ulus), one of the thirty-four in the Sakha Republic, Russia. It is located in the center of the republic and borders Megino-Kangalassky District in the east, Amginsky and Aldansky Districts in the south, Olyokminsky District in the southwest, Gorny District in the northwest, and the territory of the city of republic significance of Yakutsk in the north. The area of the district is 24,700 square kilometers (9,500 sq mi). Its administrative center is the town of Pokrovsk. As of the 2010 Census, the total population of the district, excluding its administrative center, was 24,557.

== Geography ==
The main river in the district is the Lena. The Lena Pillars National Park is located in the district along the right bank of the Lena River and the left bank of the Sinyaya River. The Turuuk Khaya Rocks, a protected area, are unusual rock formations by the Lyutenge River. The Tamma river forms the border between this district and Megino-Kangalassky District in a stretch of its course. Other important rivers are the Menda and the Kenkeme.

The average January temperature is −40 °C (−40 °F) and the average July temperature is +19 °C (66 °F). Average annual precipitation is about 200–350 millimeters (7.9–13.8 in).

== History ==
The modern era(before 1628), the Tygyn Darkhan who was Toyon united several tribes in southern Yakutia, centered around the Khangalas, to create a kingdom-like confederal structure (Sakha Confederation or Khangalas Toyonate). But it was occupied and colonized by the Tsardom of Russia in 1632.

The district was established on February 10, 1930 as Zapadno-Kangalassky District (Западно-Кангаласский район). From 1937 to 1992, it was known as Ordzhonikidzevsky District (Орджоникидзевский район).

== Administrative and municipal status ==
Within the framework of administrative divisions, Khangalassky District is one of the thirty-four in the republic. It is divided into one town (an administrative division with the administrative center in the town (inhabited locality) of Pokrovsk), one settlement (an administrative division with the administrative center in the urban-type settlement (inhabited locality) of Mokhsogollokh), and sixteen rural okrugs (naslegs), which comprise twenty-seven rural localities. As a municipal division, the district is incorporated as Khangalassky Municipal District. Within the municipal district, the Town of Pokrovsk is incorporated into Pokrovsk Urban Settlement, the Settlement of Mokhsogollokh is incorporated into Mokhsogollokh Urban Settlement, and the sixteen rural okrugs are incorporated into sixteen rural settlements. The town of Pokrovsk serves as the administrative center of both the administrative and municipal district.

=== Inhabited localities ===
Administrative/municipal composition
Towns/Urban settlements	Population	Inhabited localities in jurisdiction
Pokrovsk (Покровск)	9,495	**town of Pokrovsk** (administrative center of the district)
Settlements/Urban settlements	Population	Inhabited localities in jurisdiction
Mokhsogollokh (Мохсоголлох)	6,698	**urban-type settlement of Mokhsogollokh**
Rural okrugs/Rural settlements	Population	Rural localities in jurisdiction
Bestyakhsky (Бестяхский)	2,449	**selo of Bestyakh**; selo of Charang
Zhemkonsky 1-y (Жемконский 1-й)	1,112	**selo of Tit-Ebya**; selo of Khotochchu
Zhemkonsky 2-y (Жемконский 2-й)	1,019	**selo of Kerdyom**; selo of Nuochakha
Zhersky (Жерский)	838	**selo of Ulakh-An**
Isitsky (Иситский)	343	**selo of Isit**; selo of Nokhoroy
Kachikatsky (Качикатский)	1,426	**selo of Kachikattsy**; selo of Kysyl-Yuryuyya
Malzhagarsky 1-y (Мальжагарский 1-й)	1,669	**selo of Bulgunnyakhtakh**; selo of Toyon-Ary
Malzhagarsky 2-y (Мальжагарский 2-й)	1,118	**selo of Ulakhan-An**; selo of Yelanka
Malzhagarsky 4-y (Мальжагарский 4-й)	386	**selo of Yedey**
Malzhagarsky 5-y (Мальжагарский 5-й)	453	**selo of Kytyl-Dyura**
Nemyuginsky (Немюгинский)	2,266	**selo of Oy**
Oktyomsky (Октёмский)	2,169	**selo of Oktyomtsy**; selo of Chapayevo
Sinsky (Синский)	976	**selo of Sinsk**
Tyokhtyursky (Тёхтюрский)	630	**selo of Tyokhtyur**; selo of Karapatskoye
Tit-Arynsky (aka Tit-Arinsky) (Тит-Арынский, aka Тит-Аринский)	766	**selo of Tit-Ary**; selo of Kharyyalakh; selo of Chkalov
Tumulsky (Тумульский)	239	**selo of Tumul**

*Administrative centers are shown in bold

== Economy ==
The economy of the district is mostly based on agriculture and production of construction materials. The A360 Lena Highway runs through the district.

== Demographics ==
Population of Khangalassky District
- 2021 Census: 34,638
- 2010 Census: 24,557
- 2002 Census: 25,109
- 1989 Census: 35,094
- 1979 Census: 27,498

As of the 2021 Census, the ethnic composition was as follows:

- Yakuts: 67.6%
- Russians: 27.8%
- Evenks: 1.5%
- others: 3.1%
