= Pokrovsk, Sakha Republic =

Pokrovsk Покровск
- Town under republic jurisdiction

Other transcription(s)
  - Yakut: Покровскай
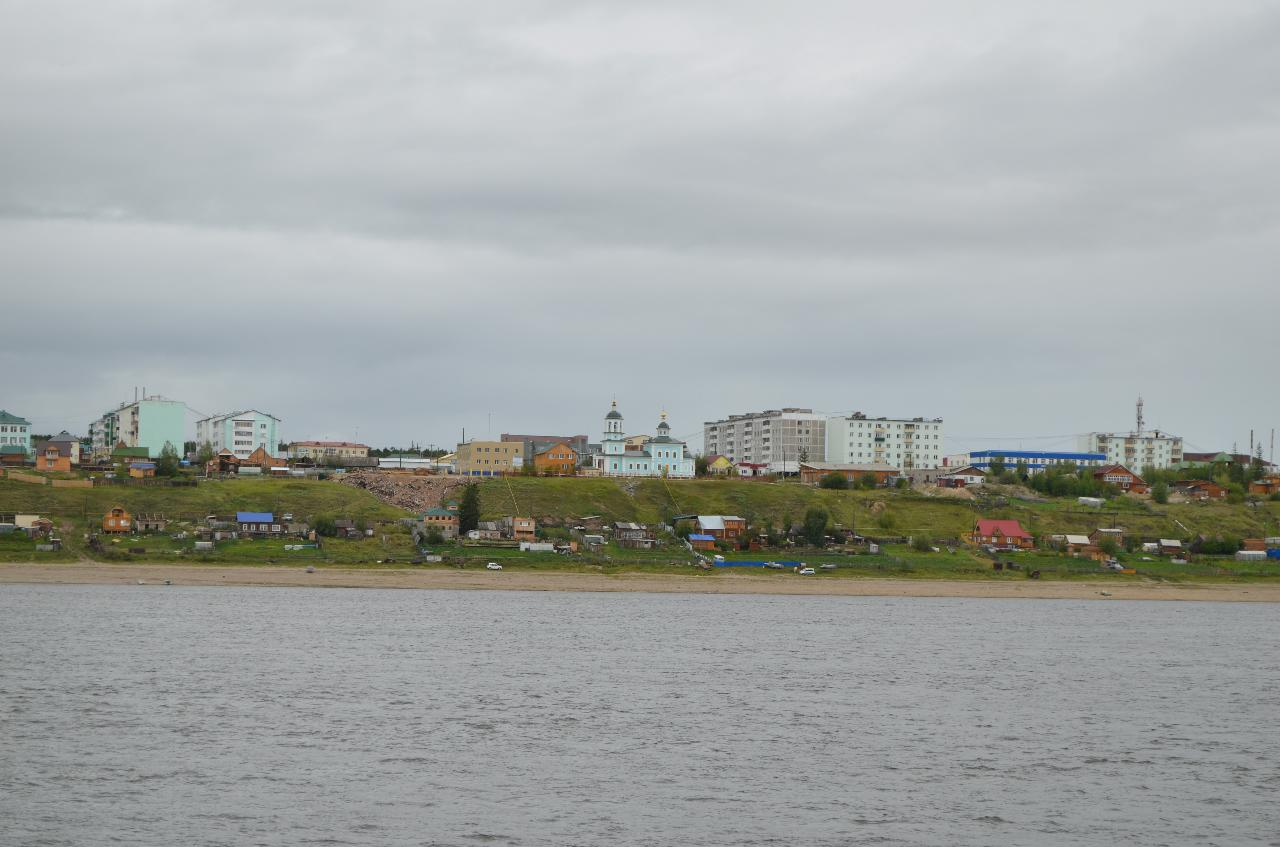
- View of Pokrovsk from the Lena River

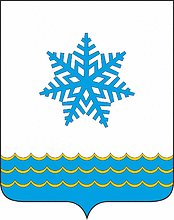
- Flag Coat of arms
- Interactive map of Pokrovsk
- Location of Pokrovsk Pokrovsk (Sakha Republic)
- Coordinates: 61°29′N 129°09′E
- Country: Russia
- Federal subject: Sakha Republic
- Administrative district: Khangalassky District
- TownSelsoviet: Pokrovsk
- Founded: 1682
- Town status since: 1998
- Elevation: 120 m (390 ft)

Population (2010 Census)
  - Total: 9,495
  - Estimate (2023): 11,991 (+26.3%)

Administrative status
  - Capital of: Khangalassky District, Town of Pokrovsk

Municipal status
  - Municipal district: Khangalassky Municipal District
  - Urban settlement: Pokrovsk Urban Settlement
  - Capital of: Khangalassky Municipal District, Pokrovsk Urban Settlement
- Time zone: UTC+
- Postal codes: 678000–678002, 678009
- Dialing code: +7 41144
- OKTMO ID: 98644101001

Pokrovsk population
- 2010 Census: 9,495
- 2002 Census: 10,092
- 1989 Census: 9,283
- 1979 Census: 7,342

Pokrovsk (Russian: Покро́вск; Yakut: Покровскай, Pokrovskay) is a town and the administrative center of Khangalassky District of the Sakha Republic, Russia, located on the left bank of the Lena River, 78 kilometers (48 mi) southwest of Yakutsk, the capital of the republic. As of the 2010 Census, its population was 9,495.

== History ==
It was first founded by the Cossacks in 1682 as the ostrog of Karaulny Mys (Карау́льный Мыс), meaning "watchtower point". It later became the selo of Pokrovskoye (Покро́вское). It was granted urban-type settlement status and renamed Pokrovsk in 1941; town status was granted to it in 1998.

== Administrative and municipal status ==
Within the framework of administrative divisions, Pokrovsk serves as the administrative center of Khangalassky District. As an inhabited locality, Pokrovsk is classified as a town under republic jurisdiction. As an administrative division, it is incorporated within Khangalassky District as the Town of Pokrovsk. As a municipal division, the Town of Pokrovsk is incorporated within Khangalassky Municipal District as Pokrovsk Urban Settlement.

== Transport ==
The Lena Highway connecting Yakutsk with the destinations further south is on the opposite bank of the Lena River, passing through the selo of Kerdyom.
