= Agayakan (village) =

Agayakan Агаякан
- Selo
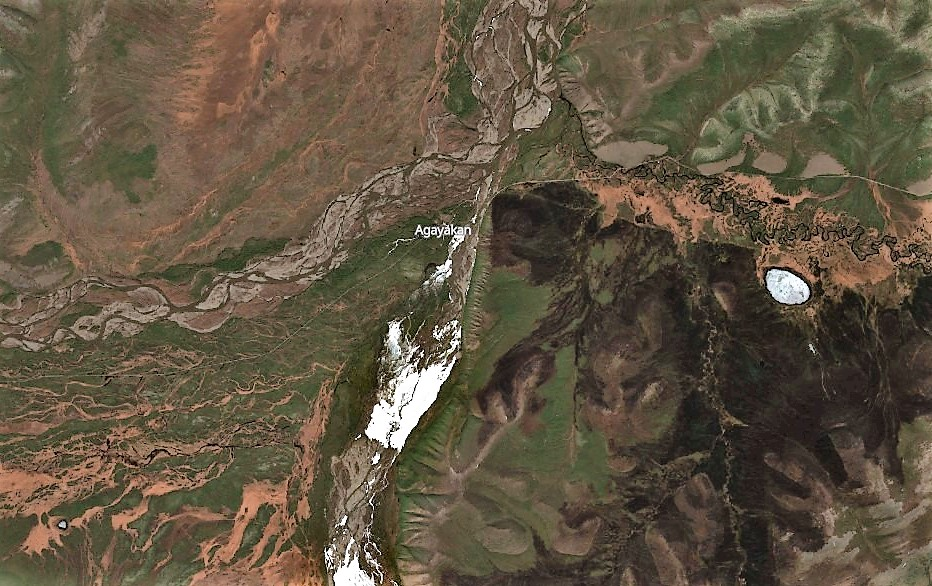
- Interactive map of Agayakan
- Location of Agayakan Agayakan (Sakha Republic)
- Coordinates: 63°20′05″N 141°38′38″E
- Country: Russia
- Federal subject: Sakha Republic
- Administrative district: Oymyakonsky District
- Rural okrugSelsoviet: Second Borogonsky Rural Okrug

Population
  - Estimate (2002): 0 )

Municipal status
  - Municipal district: Oymyakonsky Municipal District
  - Rural settlement: Second Borogonsky Rural Settlement
- Time zone: UTC+
- Postal code: 678750
- OKTMO ID: 98639410106

Agayakan (Russian: Агаякан; Yakut: Агайакаан, Agayakaan) is an abandoned village, which used to be a rural locality (a selo). It was one of four settlements in Second Borogonsky Rural Okrug of Oymyakonsky District in the Sakha Republic, Russia, in addition to Tomtor, the administrative center of the Rural Okrug, Aeroport and Kuydusun. Its population as of the 2002 Census was 0.

== Geography ==
Agayakan is located 660 kilometers (410 mi) from Ust-Nera, the administrative center of the district and 90 kilometers (56 mi) from Tomtor. The deserted village is located close to the confluence of the Agayakan and Suntar rivers, which form the Kyuyente, a tributary of the Indigirka. The minimum temperature of −57.0 °C (−70.6 °F) was recorded on December 5, 2023, in Agayakan.
