= Artyk =

Artyk (Russian: Артык) is the name of multiple inhabited localities in Russia and Turkmenistan.

Urban localities

- Artyk, Sakha Republic, an urban-type settlement in Oymyakonsky District of the Sakha Republic

Rural localities

- Artyk, Turkmenistan, a village in Artyk geňeşligi, Kaka District, Ahal Province
- Artyk, Udmurt Republic, a village in Vasilyevsky Selsoviet of Krasnogorsky District in the Udmurt Republic
