= Climate of Verkhoyansk =

The climate of Verkhoyansk is sharply continental with extremely frosty long winters and warm short summers.

There is little precipitation — 150-200 mm, which is comparable to the amount of precipitation in deserts. Frosts are possible all year round, including summer.

The lowest temperature recorded in Verkhoyansk is -67.6 °C, the absolute minimum temperature in the northern hemisphere (the record is disputed by Oymyakon);

The highest temperature recorded in Verkhoyansk is 38 °C, the absolute maximum temperature in the Arctic.

The city is considered a pole of cold and a populated area with the most extreme temperature fluctuations.

In this area, temperature inversions are constantly forming in winter due to the extremely cold and dense air of the Asian anticyclone in deep depressions, so that the temperature increases rather than decreases with increasing altitude.

== General climatic and phenological characteristics of the months of the year ==
For each month, there is a specific characteristic corresponding to the temperature regime (average monthly tcp air temperature) of that month.:

January — an extremely frosty month with an average monthly temperature of about -42..−49 °C. Precipitation falls in the form of snow, the snow cover is constant. The light day is short, from 1.5 at the beginning to 6 hours at the end of the month. There is no vegetation.

February is an extremely frosty month with an average monthly temperature of about -41..−43 °C. Precipitation falls in the form of snow. The snow cover is constant. The light day is short, from 6 at the beginning to 9.5 hours at the end of the month. There is no vegetation.

March is a frosty month with an average monthly temperature of about -28..-30 °C. Precipitation falls in the form of snow. The snow cover is constant. Daylight hours increase from 10 to 13.5 hours by the end of the month. There is no vegetation.

April is a moderately frosty month with an average monthly temperature of about -12..−13 °C. Precipitation falls mainly in the form of snow. The snow cover is constant, starting to melt in the last days of the month. Daylight hours are significant (increases from 13.5 to 17.5 hours by the end of the month). There is no vegetation.

May is a cool month with an average monthly temperature of about +3..+5 °C. Precipitation occurs in the form of rain and snow. Stable snow cover melts in the first half of the month, but in some places it may persist until the third decade. The daylight hours are long, starting at 18 hours at the beginning of the month, white nights come on May 7, and May 30 is a polar day. Vegetation begins and wildlife awakens.

June is a warm (sometimes moderately hot) month with an average monthly temperature of about +13..+15 °C. Precipitation falls mainly in the form of rain, but snow and frost are possible. Snow cover is usually absent. The Polar Day lasts throughout June. Vegetation and processes in wildlife are active.

July is a moderately hot month with an average monthly temperature of about +16..+17 °C (the warmest month). Precipitation falls in the form of rain, but sleet is possible, and in some years frosts. There is no snow cover. The polar day ends on July 15, and by the end of the month, daylight hours are reduced to 19.5 hours. Vegetation and processes in wildlife are active.

August is a warm month with an average monthly temperature of about +11..+12 °C. Precipitation falls mainly in the form of rain, but snow and frost are possible. There is no snow cover. The White Nights end on August 7th. Daylight hours are long (reduced from 19.5 to 15 hours by the end of the month). Vegetation and processes in wildlife are active.

September is a cool month with an average monthly temperature of about +2..+3 °C. Precipitation occurs in the form of rain and snow. Stable snow cover is formed in the last days of the month. Daylight hours are reduced from 15 to 11.5 hours by the end of the month. Vegetation slows down and stops in the second half of September, and nature goes into winter hibernation. Glaciation is already possible on rivers and lakes at the end of the month.

October is a frosty month with an average monthly temperature of about -14..−15 °C. Precipitation falls mainly in the form of snow. The snow cover is constant. Daylight hours are reduced from 11.5 to 7.5 hours by the end of the month. There is no vegetation.

November is an extremely frosty month with an average monthly temperature of about -34..−36 °C. Precipitation falls in the form of snow. The snow cover is constant. Daylight hours are reduced from 7.5 to 3 hours by the end of the month. There is no vegetation.

December is an extremely frosty month with an average monthly temperature of about -42..−44 °C. Precipitation falls in the form of snow. The snow cover is constant. Daylight at the beginning of the month is 3 hours; from December 16 to December 28, there is a polar night (the sun does not rise above the horizon, at true noon there is only civil twilight); by the end of the month, daylight increases to 1.5 hours. There is no vegetation.

== General characteristics ==
The climate of Verkhoyansk is the coldest on the mainland (after Oymyakon). The average annual temperature here is -14.5 °C (in Oymyakon -15.5 °C). Winters in Verkhoyansk are extremely frosty and long: snow falls from the end of September to the beginning of May; from November 10 to March 15, thaws are absolutely excluded, and frosts below -50 °C occur almost every year and are not unusual, however, with the invasion of a cyclone from the Pacific Ocean, the temperature can rise to -20 in a couple of days. °C and snowfall. The average daily temperature drops below 0 °C on average in the third decade of September, and it becomes above 0 °C only in the first decade of May. The driest month is April (4 mm of precipitation). The wettest months are in July, when an average of 34 mm of precipitation falls.

Due to the sharply continental climate and the absence of large bodies of water in the vicinity of the city, the temperature regime strongly depends on the incoming solar energy to the earth's surface. So, spring is warmer than autumn, August is colder than June, and February is warmer than December.

In general, winter takes up most of the year with a duration of about 7.5 months. Summer lasts only 1.5 months, and spring and autumn are two short transitional seasons with large temperature fluctuations (with a sharp seasonal decrease/increase in temperature), which last about 1-1.5 months.

=== Air temperature ===
The average air temperature in Verkhoyansk, according to long-term observations, is -14.5 °C. The warmest month is July, with an average temperature of 16.5 °C. The coldest month is January with an average temperature of -45.4 °C. The third coldest January, 1900 -54.1°, was exactly the same as in Delankir in 1964 and in Oymyakon in 1931, and even colder were the second coldest January in 1908 -55.1° and the coldest January in 1892 -55.4°. The highest temperature recorded in Verkhoyansk for the entire observation period is +38 °C (June 20, 2020), and the lowest is -67.8 °C (January 1, February 5-7, 1892). Interestingly, the November minimum monthly average is not the lowest in Yakutia, as in Yurts in 1958 it reached -46.1°, which is 1.9° colder than the lowest in Verkhoyansk, and Verkhoyansk is also the only city in Yakutia where temperatures officially reached -49° in October, which makes it lower than the second lowest temperature. April Shelagonets (-48.5°), although still higher than the absolute minimum of April in Shelagonets (-49.5°). But this is obviously due to a smaller number of measurements in Oymyakon, with the same base as in Verkhoyansk, the October minimum at the recognized cold pole could well reach -50 °. At the same time, the minimum March monthly average in Sakha was also observed in Delankir and amounted to -39.3 °C in March 1954, which is one degree lower than the record of Verkhoyansk.

The weather with a stable positive temperature is set, on average, on May 8, and with a stable average temperature below zero — on September 22.

Maximum and minimum monthly average temperature
Month	Jan	Feb	Mar	Apr	Маy	Jun	Jul	Aug	Sep	Оct	Nov	Dec
The warmest, °C	−38,6	−33,8	−17,9	−4,6	8,1	19,2	22,0	15,5	6,4	−7,9	−25,3	−36,0
The coldest, °C	−55,4	−50,7	−38,3	−22,3	−2,2	8,7	11,4	7,2	−1,5	−22,1	−44,2	−52,7

	Jan	Feb	Маr	Apr	Маy	Jun	Jul	Aug	Sep	Оct	Now	Dec
The warmest	2016	1995	2017	2014	2010	2020	2001	2008	1995	1947	1927	1901
The coldest	1892	1919	1886	1896	1963	2004	1990	1915	1885	1940	1958	1885

Year	Jan	Feb	Маr	Аpr	Маy	Jun	Jul	Aug	Sep	Оct	Nov	Dec	Year
The absolute maximum	1997	1938	2017	1943	1981	2020	1988	1969	1934	1949	1975	1979	2020
The absolute minimum	1892	1892	1912	1896	1890	1982	1964	1962	1957	1915	1960	1902	1892

=== Precipitation, relative humidity, and cloud cover ===
The average annual precipitation in Verkhoyansk is about 150-200 mm (from 45 mm in 1911 to 284 mm in 1978).

==== The amount of precipitation in recent years ====
There is a lot of precipitation from June to August, with the maximum occurring in July and August, and the minimum precipitation occurring in March and April. During the year, the average number of days with precipitation is about 170 (from 9 days in August to 19 days in December). The rainiest month was July 2005, when 114 mm of precipitation fell (with a norm of 34 mm).

The lower cloud cover is 1.5 points, the total cloud cover is 5.8 points.

Cloud cover
Month	Jan	Feb	Маr	Аpr	Маy	Jun	Jul	Aug	Sep	Oct	Nov	Dec	Year
Total cloud cover, points	5,0	4,8	4,3	5,0	6,5	6,4	6,3	6,6	7,1	6,7	5,8	5,0	5,8
Lower cloud cover, points	0,1	0,1	0,1	0,6	2,6	3,0	3,0	3,2	3,3	1,7	0,3	0,1	1,5

== Climatogram ==
Climate data for Verkhoyansk (1991–2020, extremes 1869–present)
Month	Jan	Feb	Mar	Apr	May	Jun	Jul	Aug	Sep	Oct	Nov	Dec	Year
Record high °C (°F)	−9.5 (14.9)	−0.3 (31.5)	5.6 (42.1)	14.3 (57.7)	28.1 (82.6)	38.0 (100.4)	37.3 (99.1)	33.7 (92.7)	25.1 (77.2)	14.5 (58.1)	1.1 (34.0)	−5.3 (22.5)	38.0 (100.4)
Mean maximum °C (°F)	−26.6 (−15.9)	−22.7 (−8.9)	−4.5 (23.9)	7.3 (45.1)	21.2 (70.2)	29.7 (85.5)	31.5 (88.7)	28.2 (82.8)	17.8 (64.0)	4.3 (39.7)	−13.6 (7.5)	−23.8 (−10.8)	4.1 (39.4)
Mean daily maximum °C (°F)	−41.6 (−42.9)	−36.7 (−34.1)	−18.8 (−1.8)	−1.8 (28.8)	10.3 (50.5)	20.6 (69.1)	23.4 (74.1)	19.2 (66.6)	8.7 (47.7)	−8.5 (16.7)	−30.0 (−22.0)	−40.6 (−41.1)	−8.0 (17.6)
Daily mean °C (°F)	−44.7 (−48.5)	−42.1 (−43.8)	−28.9 (−20.0)	−10.9 (12.4)	4.2 (39.6)	13.9 (57.0)	16.5 (61.7)	12.1 (53.8)	2.8 (37.0)	−13.4 (7.9)	−33.7 (−28.7)	−43.6 (−46.5)	−13.7 (7.3)
Mean daily minimum °C (°F)	−47.7 (−53.9)	−46.3 (−51.3)	−37.4 (−35.3)	−20.4 (−4.7)	−2.0 (28.4)	7.3 (45.1)	10.0 (50.0)	5.7 (42.3)	−1.9 (28.6)	−18.0 (−0.4)	−37.3 (−35.1)	−46.3 (−51.3)	−19.5 (−3.1)
Mean minimum °C (°F)	−55.2 (−67.4)	−54.0 (−65.2)	−49.2 (−56.6)	−35.8 (−32.4)	−13.2 (8.2)	−0.4 (31.3)	1.9 (35.4)	−2.4 (27.7)	−10.9 (12.4)	−35.3 (−31.5)	−47.6 (−53.7)	−53.1 (−63.6)	−56.4 (−69.5)
Record low °C (°F)	−67.8 (−90.0)	−67.8 (−90.0)	−60.3 (−76.5)	−57.2 (−71.0)	−34.2 (−29.6)	−7.9 (17.8)	−3.2 (26.2)	−9.9 (14.2)	−21.7 (−7.1)	−48.7 (−55.7)	−57.2 (−71.0)	−64.5 (−84.1)	−67.8 (−90.0)
Average precipitation mm (inches)	6 (0.2)	5 (0.2)	5 (0.2)	4 (0.2)	16 (0.6)	30 (1.2)	34 (1.3)	30 (1.2)	22 (0.9)	13 (0.5)	11 (0.4)	6 (0.2)	182 (7.2)
Average extreme snow depth cm (inches)	20 (7.9)	22 (8.7)	24 (9.4)	18 (7.1)	1 (0.4)	0 (0)	0 (0)	0 (0)	0 (0)	5 (2.0)	12 (4.7)	16 (6.3)	24 (9.4)
Average rainy days	0	0	0	1	8	14	14	14	10	0.4	0	0	61
Average snowy days	17	16	12	9	8	1	0.3	0.4	8	17	18	16	123
Average relative humidity (%)	74	74	69	63	58	57	61	69	74	78	77	75	69
Mean monthly sunshine hours	2	83.1	244.1	285.2	305.8	339.6	316.3	231.5	129.6	98.0	23.8	0	2,099
Source 1: Погода и Климат January record
Source 2: NOAA, Infoclimat

Daytime temperature during heat waves in June 2020 in Verkhoyansk, +28 and above Month/Date 12 13 14 15 16 17 18 19 20 21 22 23 24 25 26 27 28 29 30 See month. max. A Normal Anomaly + June, +t °C 29,5 31,8 34,0 38,0 36,2 34,5 32,9 34,0 34,8 31,5 34,4 35,6 27,0 20.6 +6.4

== Precipitation ==
=== Average number of days with solid, liquid and mixed precipitation ===
According to statistics, March is the driest month of the year in Verkhoyansk. The greatest amount of precipitation falls in July and August.

Type of precipitation	Jan	Feb	Маr	Apr	Маy	Jun	Jul	Aug	Sep	Oct	Nov	Dec	Year
Solid	17	15	12	8	4	0,3	0	0	4	17	18	16	111
Mixed	0	0	0	1	3	1	0,3	0,3	4	0,4	0	0	10
Liquid	0	0	0	0,1	5	13	14	14	6	0	0	0	52

=== Snow cover ===
Month	Jul	Aug	Sep	Oct	Nov	Dec	Jan	Feb	Маr	Apr	Маy	Jun	Year
Number of days	0	0	2	24	29	30	31	28	31	28	5	0	207
Height (cm)	0	0	0	5	12	16	20	22	24	18	1	0	
Max. height (cm)	0	16	14	37	60	44	44	45	46	46	36	3	60

=== Average number of days with different phenomena ===
Month	Jan	Feb	Маr	Аpr	Маy	Jun	Jul	Aug	Sep	Oct	Nov	Dec	Year
Rain	0	0	0	1	8	14	14	14	10	0,4	0	0	61
Snow	17	16	12	9	8	1	0,3	0,4	0,3	8	18	16	116
Fog	1	0,3	0,2	0,1	0,03	0,1	1	5	5	1	0,1	1	15
The Mist	0	0	0	0	0	0	1	1	0	0	0	0	2
Thunderstorm	0	0	0	0	0,1	2	3	1	0,03	0	0	0	6
Snowstorm	0	1	2	1	0,2	0	0	0	0	1	1	1	7
The Dust Storm	0	0	0	0	0,1	0,1	0,1	0,1	0	0	0	0	0,4
Black ice	0	0	0	0	0	0,1	0	0	0	0,1	0	0	0,2
Frost	0,1	0	0	0	0	0	0	0	0,2	0	0	1	1

== Wind ==
=== Wind speed ===
Month	Jan	Feb	Mar	Apr	May	Jun	Jul	Aug	Sep	Oct	Nov	Dec	Year
Скорость ветра (м/с)	0,6	0,5	0,7	1,5	2,4	2,6	2,2	1,7	1,6	1,1	0,7	0,7	1,4

The average annual wind speed in Verkhoyansk is 1.4 m/s or 5 km/h. In the warm season, the wind speed is higher than in the cold season. The windiest month is June.

== Links ==
- http://www.pogodaiklimat.ru/climate/24266.htm
- МЕТЕОСТАНЦИЯ ВЕРХОЯНСКА on YouTube — репортаж ГТРК Саха
