= Bereg-Yurdya =

Bereg-Yurdya Берег-Юрдя
- Selo
- Interactive map of Bereg-Yurdya
- Location of Bereg-Yurdya Bereg-Yurdya (Sakha Republic)
- Coordinates: 63°27′09″N 142°53′18″E
- Country: Russia
- Federal subject: Sakha Republic
- Administrative district: Oymyakonsky District
- Rural okrugSelsoviet: First Borogonsky Rural Okrug

Population
  - Estimate (2002): 299 )

Municipal status
  - Municipal district: Oymyakonsky Municipal District
  - Rural settlement: First Borogonsky Rural Settlement
- Time zone: UTC+
- Postal code: 678752
- OKTMO ID: 98639405106

Bereg-Yurdya (Russian: Берег-Юрдя; Yakut: Биэрэк Үрдэ, Bierek Ürde) is a rural locality (a selo), and one of three settlements in First Borogonsky Rural Okrug of Oymyakonsky District in the Sakha Republic, Russia, in addition to Oymyakon, the administrative center of the Rural Okrug and Khara-Tumul. It is located 605 kilometers (376 mi) from Ust-Nera, the administrative center of the district and 7 kilometers (4.3 mi) from Oymyakon. Its population as of the 2002 Census was 299.
