= Sharply continental climate =

A sharply continental climate is a type of climate in temperate latitudes, characteristic of the interior regions of continents, isolated from the world's oceans and under the influence of high pressure areas.

== Peculiarities ==
The weather type is anticyclonic; the amount of precipitation is insignificant-less than 400 mm; humidity is low, with a moisture coefficient of less than 1. Large amplitudes of temperature fluctuations are typical - both annual and daily. Winters are long, with little snow and very cold - at the pole of cold in the central and eastern regions of the Sakha Republic, temperatures down to -65 °C are possible. Summer is usually warm (the average temperature of the warmest month is 15-20 °C, the average maximum is over 25 °C), but short; there is slightly more precipitation in summer than in winter (most of it falls in July).

== Area of distribution ==
A sharply continental climate is found only in the Northern Hemisphere - this is due to the fact that in the temperate latitudes of the Southern Hemisphere there is almost no land, and therefore no conditions for the formation of continental air masses. It is typical for the internal regions of North America and Eurasia; in Russia, the areas of sharply continental climate are Eastern and Central Siberia.

Examples of a sharply continental climate are the city of Yakutsk, located in the center of Yakutia, and the city of Verkhoyansk in its north (characterized by the largest seasonal temperature differences in the world), as well as Astrakhan.

Climate data for Yakutsk (1971 a 2000)
Month	Jan	Feb	Mar	Apr	May	Jun	Jul	Aug	Sep	Oct	Nov	Dec	Year
Record high °C (°F)	−5.8 (21.6)	−2.2 (28.0)	8.3 (46.9)	18.8 (65.8)	31.1 (88.0)	35.1 (95.2)	37.4 (99.3)	35.4 (95.7)	27.0 (80.6)	16.9 (62.4)	3.9 (39.0)	−2.5 (27.5)	37.4 (99.3)
Mean daily maximum °C (°F)	−35.3 (−31.5)	−29.8 (−21.6)	−14.8 (5.4)	0.5 (32.9)	12.9 (55.2)	22.4 (72.3)	25.4 (77.7)	21.5 (70.7)	11.5 (52.7)	−4.1 (24.6)	−24.2 (−11.6)	−34.3 (−29.7)	−4.0 (24.8)
Daily mean °C (°F)	−39 (−38)	−34.5 (−30.1)	−22.3 (−8.1)	−6.1 (21.0)	6.7 (44.1)	15.4 (59.7)	18.7 (65.7)	15.0 (59.0)	5.8 (42.4)	−8.3 (17.1)	−28.7 (−19.7)	−38 (−36)	−9.6 (14.8)
Mean daily minimum °C (°F)	−42.8 (−45.0)	−40 (−40)	−30 (−22)	−12.9 (8.8)	0.4 (32.7)	8.6 (47.5)	11.7 (53.1)	8.8 (47.8)	0.5 (32.9)	−12.9 (8.8)	−33.2 (−27.8)	−41.7 (−43.1)	−14.1 (6.6)
Record low °C (°F)	−60.6 (−77.1)	−59.8 (−75.6)	−54.9 (−66.8)	−41 (−42)	−21.6 (−6.9)	−5.4 (22.3)	−1.5 (29.3)	−7.8 (18.0)	−17.1 (1.2)	−40.9 (−41.6)	−49.6 (−57.3)	−56.9 (−70.4)	−64.4 (−83.9)
Average precipitation mm (inches)	9 (0.4)	8 (0.3)	7 (0.3)	8 (0.3)	20 (0.8)	35 (1.4)	39 (1.5)	37 (1.5)	31 (1.2)	18 (0.7)	16 (0.6)	10 (0.4)	238 (9.4)
Average precipitation days (≥ 1.0 mm)	2.1	2.0	1.9	2.9	3.8	7.3	6.5	6.0	5.3	6.1	5.7	4.1	53.7
Average relative humidity (%)	76	76	70	60	54	57	62	67	72	78	78	76	69
Mean monthly sunshine hours	18.6	98.0	232.5	273.0	303.8	333.0	347.2	272.8	174.0	105.4	60.0	9.3	2,227.6
Source 1: Pogoda.ru.net
Source 2:

== See also ==
- Continental climate
