= Aeroport, Oymyakonsky District, Sakha Republic =

Aeroport Аэропорт
- Selo
- Interactive map of Aeroport
- Location of Aeroport Aeroport (Sakha Republic)
- Coordinates: 63°14′44″N 143°11′02″E
- Country: Russia
- Federal subject: Sakha Republic
- Administrative district: Oymyakonsky District
- Rural okrugSelsoviet: Second Borogonsky Rural Okrug

Population
  - Estimate (2002): 61 )

Municipal status
  - Municipal district: Oymyakonsky Municipal District
  - Rural settlement: Second Borogonsky Rural Settlement
- Time zone: UTC+
- Postal code: 678750
- OKTMO ID: 98639410111

Aeroport (Russian: Аэропорт) is a rural locality (a selo), and one of four settlements in Borogonsky 2-y Rural Okrug of Oymyakonsky District in the Sakha Republic, Russia, in addition to Tomtor, the administrative center of the Rural Okrug, Agayakan and Kuydusun. It is located 572 kilometers (355 mi) from Ust-Nera, the administrative center of the district and 2 kilometers (1.2 mi) from Tomtor. Its population as of the 2002 Census was 61.

The Oymyakon Airport, that gives the village its name, was built during the Second World War as part of the ALSIB route for transferring Lend-Lease aircraft from the United States to the Soviet Union. It has an unpaved runway of 1900 metres length. In 1961, a cargo flight from Yakutsk to Oymyakon crashed en route, with no survivors. In the 1990s, Oymyakon had scheduled flights operated by Sakha Avia but these no longer operate. The disused terminal building was still standing as of 2018, however.
