= Verkhoyansk (disambiguation) =

Verkhoyansk is a town in Sakha Republic, Russia.

Verkhoyansk may also refer to:

- Verkhoyansk Urban Settlement, a municipal formation of the Town of Verkhoyansk in Verkhoyansky District of Sakha Republic
- Verkhoyansk District, a district in Sakha Republic, Russia
- Verkhoyansk Range, a mountain range in Sakha Republic, Russia
- Verkhoyansk mine, a silver mine in Sakha Republic, Russia
