= Kyubeme =

Kyubeme Кюбеме
- Selo
- Interactive map of Kyubeme
- Location of Kyubeme Kyubeme (Sakha Republic)
- Coordinates: 63°25′N 140°36′E
- Country: Russia
- Federal subject: Sakha Republic
- Administrative district: Oymyakonsky District
- Rural okrugSelsoviet: Yuchyugeysky Rural Okrug

Population
  - Estimate (2002): 46 )

Municipal status
  - Municipal district: Oymyakonsky Municipal District
  - Rural settlement: Yuchyugeysky Rural Settlement
- Time zone: UTC+
- Postal code: 678756
- OKTMO ID: 98639445106

Kyubeme (Russian: Кюбеме; Yakut: Күбүмэ, Kübüme) is a rural locality (a selo) in Yuchyugeysky Rural Okrug of Oymyakonsky District in the Sakha Republic, Russia, located 241 kilometers (150 mi) from Ust-Nera, the administrative center of the district and 94 kilometers (58 mi) from Yuchyugey, the administrative center of the rural okrug. Its population as of the 2002 Census was 46.

It is located in the Suntar Khayata Range area. The R504 Kolyma Highway passes through the village.
