= Orto-Balagan =

Orto-Balagan Орто-Балаган
- Selo
- Interactive map of Orto-Balagan
- Location of Orto-Balagan Orto-Balagan (Sakha Republic)
- Coordinates: 63°09′43″N 144°01′14″E
- Country: Russia
- Federal subject: Sakha Republic
- Administrative district: Oymyakonsky District
- Rural okrugSelsoviet: Sordonnokhsky Rural Okrug
- Elevation: 785 m (2,575 ft)

Population
  - Estimate (2002): 341 )

Administrative status
  - Capital of: Sordonnokhsky Rural Okrug

Municipal status
  - Municipal district: Oymyakonsky Municipal District
  - Rural settlement: Sordonnokhsky Rural Settlement
  - Capital of: Sordonnokhsky Rural Settlement
- Time zone: UTC+
- Postal code: 678753
- OKTMO ID: 98639427101

Orto-Balagan (Russian: Орто-Балаган; Yakut: Орто Балаҕан, Orto Balağan) is a rural locality (a selo), and one of two settlements, in addition to Kuranakh-Sala in, and the administrative centre of, Sordonnokhsky Rural Okrug of Oymyakonsky District in the Sakha Republic, Russia. It is located 583 kilometers (362 mi) from Ust-Nera, the administrative center of the district. Its population as of the 2002 Census was 341.
