= Khara-Tumul =

Khara-Tumul Хара-Тумул
- Selo
- Interactive map of Khara-Tumul
- Location of Khara-Tumul Khara-Tumul (Sakha Republic)
- Coordinates: 63°28′N 142°43′E
- Country: Russia
- Federal subject: Sakha Republic
- Administrative district: Oymyakonsky District
- Rural okrugSelsoviet: Borogonsky 1-y Rural Okrug

Population
  - Estimate (2002): 299 )

Municipal status
  - Municipal district: Oymyakonsky Municipal District
  - Rural settlement: Borogonsky 1-y Rural Settlement
- Time zone: UTC+
- Postal code: 678752
- OKTMO ID: 98639405111

Khara-Tumul (Russian: Хара-Тумул) is a rural locality (a selo) in Borogonsky 1-y Rural Okrug of Oymyakonsky District in the Sakha Republic, Russia, located 615 kilometers (382 mi) from Ust-Nera, the administrative center of the district and 3 kilometers (1.9 mi) from Oymyakon, the administrative center of the rural okrug. Its population as of the 2002 Census was 244.
