= Predporozhnyy =

Predporozhnyy Предпорожный
- Urban-type Settlement (abolished)

Other transcription(s)
  - Yakut: Предпорожнай
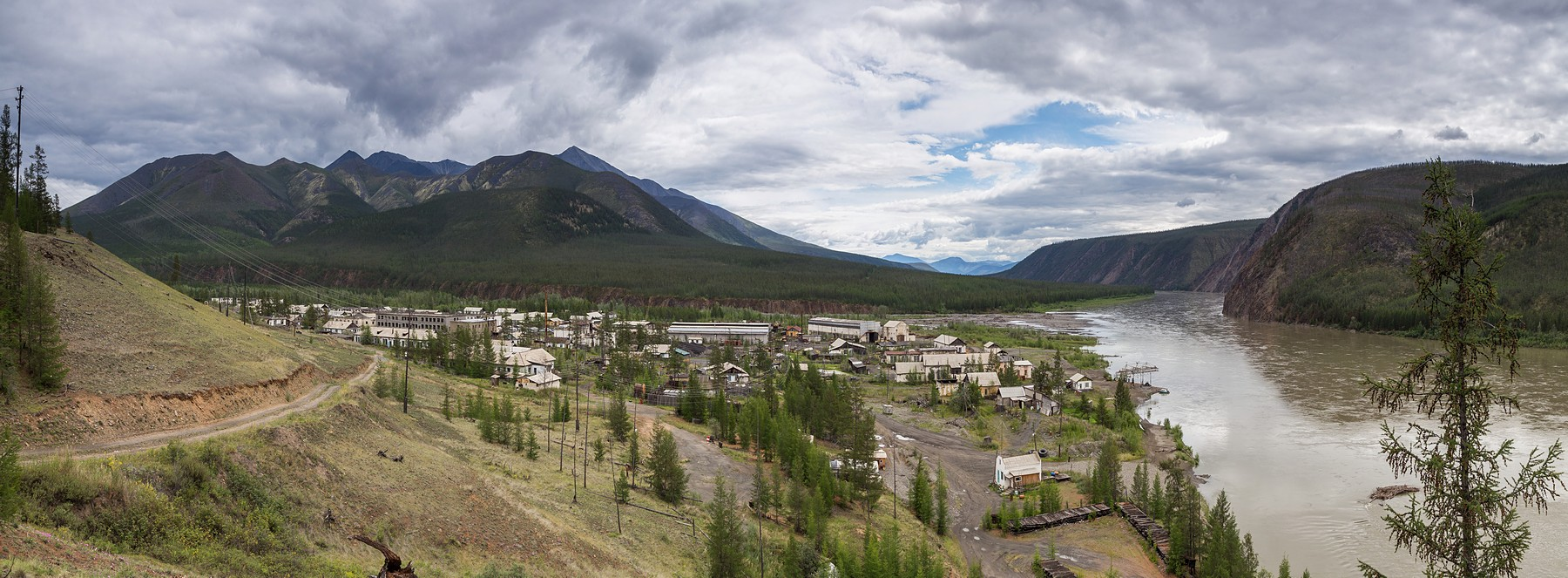
- Interactive map of Predporozhnyy
- Location of Predporozhnyy Predporozhnyy (Sakha Republic)
- Coordinates: 64°59′05.6″N 143°16′03.6″E
- Country: Russia
- Federal subject: Sakha Republic
- Administrative district: Oymyakonsky
- Abolished: 2007

Area
  - Total: 149,214.4 km^{2} (57,612.0 sq mi)

Population
  - Estimate (2013): 200 )
- Postal code: 678730

Predporozhnyy (Russian: Предпорожный; Yakut: Предпорожнай, romanized: Predporojnay) is an abandoned settlement in Oymyakonsky District, Sakha Republic, Russia. It has also been referred to as Yubileynyy (Russian: Юбилейный, lit. 'Jubilee'), the name of the local gold mine. It rose to the status of an urban-type settlement in 1964.

== Geography ==
Predporozhnyy is located in the extreme north of Oymyakonsky District, at the convergence of two branches of the Indigirka River. It is approximately 747 km from Yakutsk, and approximately 5,217 km from Moscow.

== History ==
Predporozhnyy was founded in the 1950s after the discovery of gold deposits in the area. It was classified as an urban-type settlement in 1961. The settlement was abolished in 2007.

== Climate ==
The climate of Predporozhnyy can be classified as subarctic, or Dwc under the Köppen climate classification.

Climate data for Predporozhnyy
Month	Jan	Feb	Mar	Apr	May	Jun	Jul	Aug	Sep	Oct	Nov	Dec	Year
Mean daily maximum °F (°C)	−20 (−29)	−11 (−24)	5 (−15)	23 (−5)	43 (6)	64 (18)	70 (21)	63 (17)	45 (7)	18 (−8)	−9 (−23)	−20 (−29)	23 (−5)
Mean daily minimum °F (°C)	−36 (−38)	−38 (−39)	−27 (−33)	−8 (−22)	18 (−8)	39 (4)	43 (6)	36 (2)	21 (−6)	−6 (−21)	−27 (−33)	−35 (−37)	−2 (−19)
Average rainfall inches (mm)	0.22 (5.7)	0.23 (5.9)	0.36 (9.1)	1.24 (31.4)	2.8 (72)	3.24 (82.4)	4.09 (103.9)	3.3 (83)	2.15 (54.5)	1.5 (37)	0.51 (12.9)	0.27 (6.9)	19.91 (504.7)
Average snowfall inches (cm)	2.1 (5.3)	2.2 (5.5)	3.4 (8.7)	11.5 (29.1)	10.4 (26.3)	0.4 (1)	0 (0)	0.6 (1.5)	7.1 (18.1)	14.2 (36.1)	4.9 (12.5)	2.6 (6.5)	59.4 (150.6)
Average rainy days	5	5	7	12	18	19	19	17	16	9	7	5	139
Mean monthly sunshine hours	257.6	229.5	235.7	228.3	259.4	332.2	332.6	331.6	293.4	267.8	242.2	255.5	3,265.8
Source: worldweatheronline.com
