= Delyankir =

Delyankir Делянкир
- Selo
- Interactive map of Delyankir
- Location of Delyankir Delyankir (Sakha Republic)
- Coordinates: 63°49′52″N 145°36′11″E
- Country: Russia
- Federal subject: Sakha Republic
- Administrative district: Oymyakonsky District
- SettlementSelsoviet: Settlement of Artyk
- Elevation: 801 m (2,628 ft)

Population (2010 Census)
  - Total: 3
  - Estimate (2023): 0 (−100%)

Municipal status
  - Municipal district: Oymyakonsky Municipal District
  - Urban settlement: Artyk Urban Settlement
- Time zone: UTC+
- Postal code: 678730
- OKTMO ID: 98639153106

Delyankir (Russian: Делянкир) is a rural locality (a selo) under the administrative jurisdiction of the Settlement of Artyk in Oymyakonsky District of the Sakha Republic, Russia, located 44 kilometers (27 mi) from Artyk on the Kolyma Highway on the border with Magadan Oblast. Its population as of the 2010 Census was three people, down from four recorded during the 2002 Census.

== Climate ==
Delyankir has an extreme subarctic climate (Köppen climate classification Dwd) with very short and mild summers with cool nights (in spite of white nights), followed by very long, dry, and extremely cold winters. Although summers are very mild on average, sometimes it can be surprisingly hot, especially for a place with such northerly latitude. The highest recorded temperature in July was 35.1 °C (95.2 °F). It is one of the coldest places in the northern hemisphere and the world, alongside Oymyakon and Verkhoyansk. On the night of December 8–9, 2021, the temperature went down to −61.1 °C (−78.0 °F), making it the coldest temperature recorded in December. Although in terms of the lowest-ever recorded temperature Oymyakon remains the coldest verifiable location, the year-round average temperature recorded at Delyankir's weather station between 1951 and 1989 was −16.8 °C (1.8 °F), lower than that of Oymyakon.

Delyankir is also one of the rare places in the world with a temperature amplitude higher than 100 °C (180 °F).

Climate data for Delyankir
Month	Jan	Feb	Mar	Apr	May	Jun	Jul	Aug	Sep	Oct	Nov	Dec	Year
Record high °C (°F)	−12.6 (9.3)	−8.4 (16.9)	−2.0 (28.4)	8.8 (47.8)	24.9 (76.8)	32.7 (90.9)	35.1 (95.2)	31.9 (89.4)	23.6 (74.5)	9.3 (48.7)	−7.8 (18.0)	−4.5 (23.9)	35.1 (95.2)
Mean daily maximum °C (°F)	−39.3 (−38.7)	−34.1 (−29.4)	−19.2 (−2.6)	−4 (25)	9.4 (48.9)	18.5 (65.3)	21.9 (71.4)	18.2 (64.8)	8.0 (46.4)	−9.3 (15.3)	−29.2 (−20.6)	−38.6 (−37.5)	−8.1 (17.4)
Daily mean °C (°F)	−43.3 (−45.9)	−41.1 (−42.0)	−29.3 (−20.7)	−12.9 (8.8)	3.1 (37.6)	11.3 (52.3)	14.4 (57.9)	10.4 (50.7)	1.5 (34.7)	−14.9 (5.2)	−33.9 (−29.0)	−42.2 (−44.0)	−14.7 (5.5)
Mean daily minimum °C (°F)	−47.3 (−53.1)	−46.3 (−51.3)	−38.6 (−37.5)	−22.6 (−8.7)	−3.9 (25.0)	3.1 (37.6)	6.8 (44.2)	3.3 (37.9)	−4.4 (24.1)	−20.1 (−4.2)	−38.3 (−36.9)	−45.7 (−50.3)	−21.2 (−6.1)
Record low °C (°F)	−65 (−85)	−63 (−81)	−55.2 (−67.4)	−45 (−49)	−31.8 (−25.2)	−7.4 (18.7)	−5 (23)	−8.2 (17.2)	−24 (−11)	−39.8 (−39.6)	−56.3 (−69.3)	−61.1 (−78.0)	−65 (−85)
Average precipitation mm (inches)	8 (0.3)	6 (0.2)	5 (0.2)	6 (0.2)	15 (0.6)	38 (1.5)	68 (2.7)	56 (2.2)	30 (1.2)	20 (0.8)	13 (0.5)	9 (0.4)	274 (10.8)
Average rainy days	0	0	0	0	7	12	12	13	9	0	0	0	54
Average snowy days	18	18	13	9	6	0	0	0	6	19	21	16	126
Average relative humidity (%)	78	75	72	69	63	65	72	77	77	82	80	78	74
Source: pogodaiklimat.ru
