= Kuranakh-Sala =

Kuranakh-Sala Куранах-Сала
- Selo
- Interactive map of Kuranakh-Sala
- Location of Kuranakh-Sala Kuranakh-Sala (Sakha Republic)
- Coordinates: 63°08′20″N 144°26′37″E
- Country: Russia
- Federal subject: Sakha Republic
- Administrative district: Oymyakonsky District
- Rural okrugSelsoviet: Sordonnokhsky Rural Okrug

Population
  - Estimate (2002): 19 )

Municipal status
  - Municipal district: Oymyakonsky Municipal District
  - Rural settlement: Sordonnokhsky Rural Settlement
- Time zone: UTC+
- Postal code: 678756
- OKTMO ID: 98639427106

Kuranakh-Sala (Russian: Куранах-Сала; Yakut: Кураанах Салаа, Kuraanax Salaa) is a rural locality (a selo) in Sordonnokhsky Rural Okrug of Oymyakonsky District in the Sakha Republic, Russia, located 619 kilometers (385 mi) from Ust-Nera, the administrative center of the district, and 36 kilometers (22 mi) from Orto-Balagan, the administrative center of the rural okrug. Its population as of the 2002 Census was 19.
