= Yuchyugey =

Yuchyugey Ючюгей
- Selo
- Interactive map of Yuchyugey
- Location of Yuchyugey Yuchyugey (Sakha Republic)
- Coordinates: 63°18′12″N 142°10′06″E
- Country: Russia
- Federal subject: Sakha Republic
- Administrative district: Oymyakonsky District
- Rural okrugSelsoviet: Yuchyugeysky Rural Okrug
- Elevation: 810 m (2,660 ft)

Population
  - Estimate (2002): 321 )

Administrative status
  - Capital of: Yuchyugeysky Rural Okrug

Municipal status
  - Municipal district: Oymyakonsky Municipal District
  - Rural settlement: Yuchyugeysky Rural Settlement
  - Capital of: Yuchyugeysky Rural Settlement
- Time zone: UTC+
- Postal code: 678756
- OKTMO ID: 98639445101

Yuchyugey (Russian: Ючюгей; Yakut: Үчүгэй, Üçügey) is a rural locality (a selo), and one of two settlements, in addition to Kyubeme in, and the administrative centre of, Yuchyugey Rural Okrug of Oymyakonsky District in the Sakha Republic, Russia. It is located 630 kilometers (390 mi) from Ust-Nera, the administrative center of the district. Its population as of the 2002 Census was 321.
