= Lowest temperature recorded on Earth =

Weather or lab measurements

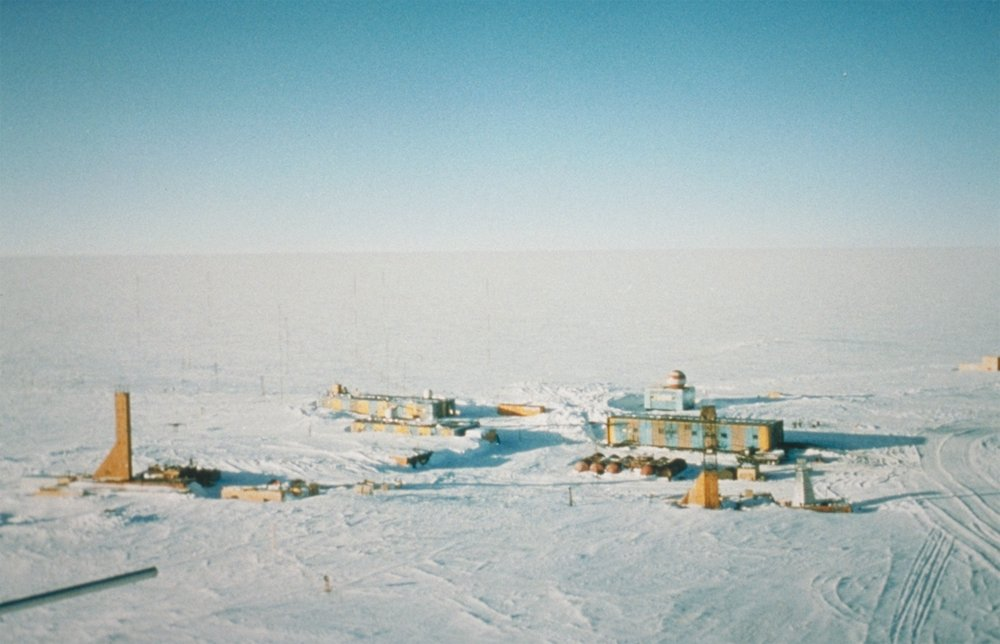
Aerial photograph of Vostok Station, the coldest directly observed location on Earth

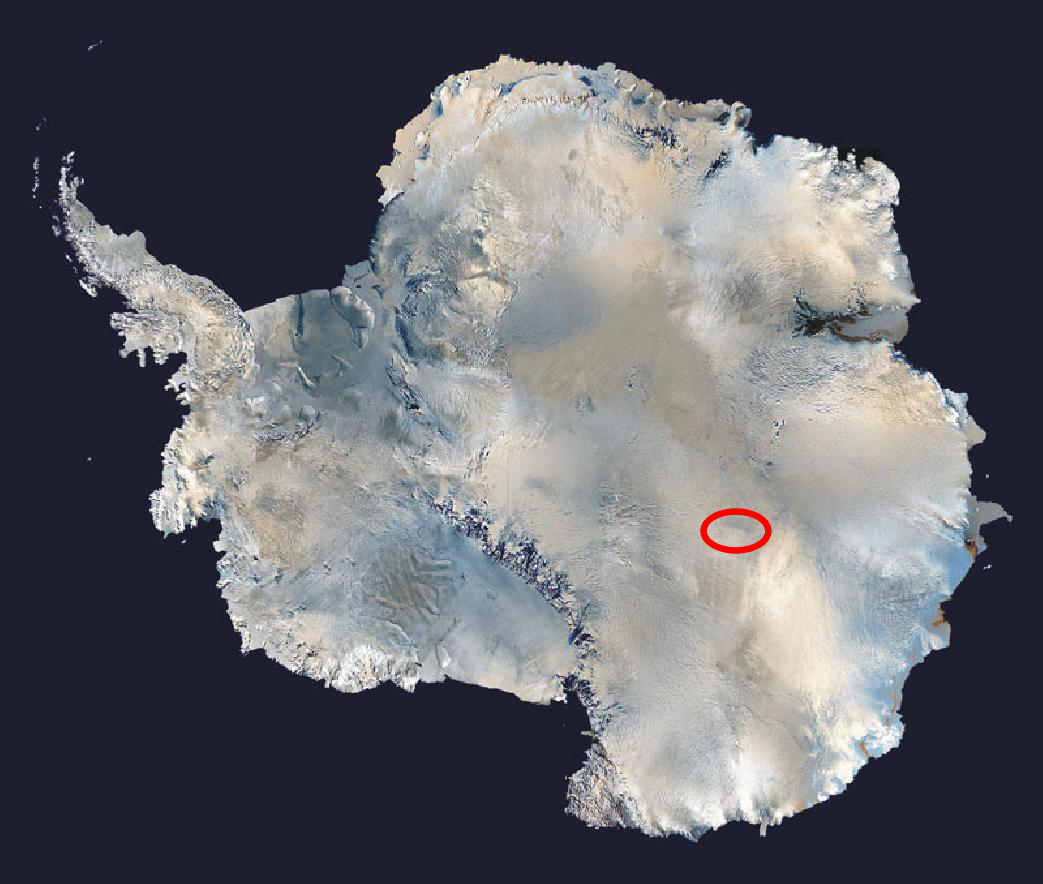
The location of Vostok Station in Antarctica

The lowest natural temperature ever directly recorded at ground level on Earth is −89.2 °C (−128.6 °F; 184.0 K) at the then-Soviet Vostok Station in Antarctica on 21 July 1983 by ground measurements.

On 10 August 2010, satellite observations showed a surface temperature of −92 °C (−134 °F; 181 K) at 81.8°S 59.3°E, along a ridge between Dome Argus and Dome Fuji, at 3,900 m (12,800 ft) elevation. The result was reported at the 46th annual meeting of the American Geophysical Union in San Francisco, California, in December 2013; it is a provisional figure, and may be subject to revision. The value is not listed as the record lowest temperature as it was measured by remote sensing from satellite and not by ground-based thermometers, unlike the 1983 record. The temperature announced reflects that of the ice surface, while the Vostok readings measured the air above the ice, and so the two are not directly comparable. Later work shows many locations in the high Antarctic where surface temperatures drop to approximately −98 °C (−144 °F; 175 K). Due to the very strong temperature gradient near the surface, these imply near-surface air temperature minima of approximately −94 °C (−137 °F; 179 K).

== Historical progression ==
On 21 January 1838, a Russian merchant named Neverov recorded a temperature of −60 °C (−76 °F; 213 K) in Yakutsk. On 15 January 1885, H. Wild reported that a temperature of −68 °C (−90 °F; 205 K) was measured in Verkhoyansk. A later measurement at the same place in February 1892 was reported as −69.8 °C (−93.6 °F; 203.3 K). Soviet researchers later announced a recording of −67.7 °C (−89.9 °F; 205.5 K) in February 1933 at Oymyakon, about 650 km (400 mi) to the south-east of Verkhoyansk; this measurement was reported by Soviet texts through the 1940s as a record low, with the previous measurement from Verkhoyansk retroactively adjusted to −67.6 °C (−89.7 °F; 205.6 K).

The next reliable measurement was made during the 1957 season at the Amundsen–Scott South Pole Station in Antarctica, yielding −73.6 °C (−100.5 °F; 199.6 K) on 11 May and −74.5 °C (−102.1 °F; 198.7 K) on 17 September. The next world record low temperature was a reading of −88.3 °C (−126.9 °F; 184.8 K), measured at the Soviet Vostok Station in 1968, on the Antarctic Plateau. Vostok again broke its own record with a reading of −89.2 °C (−128.6 °F; 184.0 K) on 21 July 1983. This remains the record for a directly recorded temperature.

== Laboratory cooling ==
=== Early experiments ===
In 1904, Dutch scientist Heike Kamerlingh Onnes created a special lab in Leiden in the Netherlands with the aim of producing liquid helium. In 1908, he managed to lower the temperature to less than −269 °C (−452.20 °F; 4.15 K), which is four degrees above absolute zero. Only in this exceptionally cold state will helium liquefy; the boiling point of helium being −268.94 °C (−452.09 °F; 4.21 K). Kamerlingh Onnes received a Nobel Prize in Physics for his achievement.

Kamerlingh Onnes' method relied upon depressurising the subject gases, causing them to cool by adiabatic cooling. This follows from the first law of thermodynamics;

$$\Delta U = \Delta Q - \Delta W$$

where U = internal energy, Q = heat added to the system, W = work done by the system.

Consider a gas in a box of set volume. If the pressure in the box is higher than atmospheric pressure, then upon opening the gas will do work on the surrounding atmosphere to expand. As this expansion is adiabatic and the gas has done work

$$\Delta Q = 0$$
$$\Delta W > 0$$
$$\Rightarrow \Delta U < 0.$$

Now as the internal energy has decreased, so has the temperature.

=== Modern experiments ===
As of November 2000, nuclear spin temperatures below 100 pK were reported for an experiment at the Helsinki University of Technology Low Temperature Lab. However, this was the temperature of one particular type of motion—a quantum property called nuclear spin—not the overall average thermodynamic temperature for all possible degrees of freedom. At such low temperatures, the concept of "temperature" becomes multifaceted since molecular motion cannot be assumed to average out across degrees of freedom. The corresponding peak emission will be in radio waves, rather than in the familiar infrared, so it is very inefficiently absorbed by neighboring atoms, making it difficult to reach thermal equilibrium.

The Low Temperature Laboratory recorded a record low temperature of 100 pK, or 1.0 × 10^{−10} K in 1999.

The current apparatus for achieving low temperatures has two stages. The first uses a helium dilution refrigerator to get to temperatures of millikelvins, then the next stage uses adiabatic nuclear demagnetisation to reach picokelvins.

Extremely low temperatures are useful for observation of quantum mechanical phases of matter such as superfluids and Bose–Einstein condensates, which would be disrupted by thermal motions.

== See also ==
- Highest temperature recorded on Earth – Weather record
- List of weather records
- Magnetic refrigeration – Change in temperature due to a magnetic field
- Pole of Cold – Coldest locations in each hemisphere
- Timeline of low-temperature technology
