= Agayakan =

Agayakan Агаякан / Агайакаан
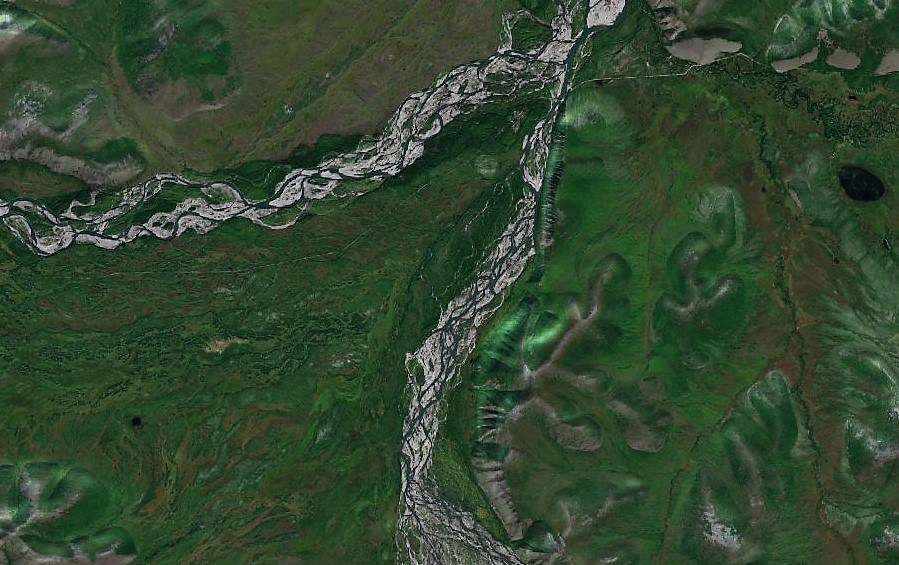
- Suntar (left) and Agayakan confluence to form the Kyuyente (top). Sentinel-2 image.

- Mouth location in Yakutia, Russia

Location
- Country: Russian Federation

Physical characteristics
- Source: Suntar-Khayata
  - coordinates: 62°16′38″N 141°31′14″E
  - elevation: 1,706 m (5,597 ft)
- Mouth: Kyuyente
  - coordinates: 63°20′59″N 141°44′54″E
  - elevation: 759 m (2,490 ft)
- Length: 160 km (99 mi)
- Basin size: 7,630 km^{2} (2,950 sq mi)

Basin features
- Progression: Kyuyente → Indigirka→ East Siberian Sea

The Agayakan (Russian: Агаякан; Yakut: Агайакаан) is a river in Oymyakonsky District, Yakutia (Sakha Republic), Russian Federation, part of the Indigirka basin. It has a length of 160 kilometres (99 mi) and a drainage basin area of 7,630 square kilometres (2,950 mi^{2}).

The river has its mouth near the abandoned village of Agayakan, located close to its final confluence.

== Course ==
The Agayakan originates in the northern slopes of the Suntar-Khayata, not far from the source of the Yudoma. It heads roughly to the NNW and northwards across the Oymyakon Highlands. Finally the Agayakan meets the Suntar river, flowing from the west, to form the Kyuyente, a tributary of the Indigirka. The river is fed by snow and rain. It freezes in late September or early October and stays frozen until late May to early June.

=== Tributaries ===
The main tributaries of the Agayakan are the 95 km (59 mi) long Neymechek, the 89 km (55 mi) long Tonskoy and the 85 km (53 mi) long Khongor on the left, as well as the 80 km (50 mi) long Ot-Khaya on the right. there are about 1,500 lakes in the Agayakan basin, with an estimated total area of 44 km^{2} (17 sq mi).

== See also ==
- List of rivers of Russia
