= Artyk, Sakha Republic =

Artyk Артык
- Urban-type settlement

Other transcription(s)
  - Yakut: Аартык
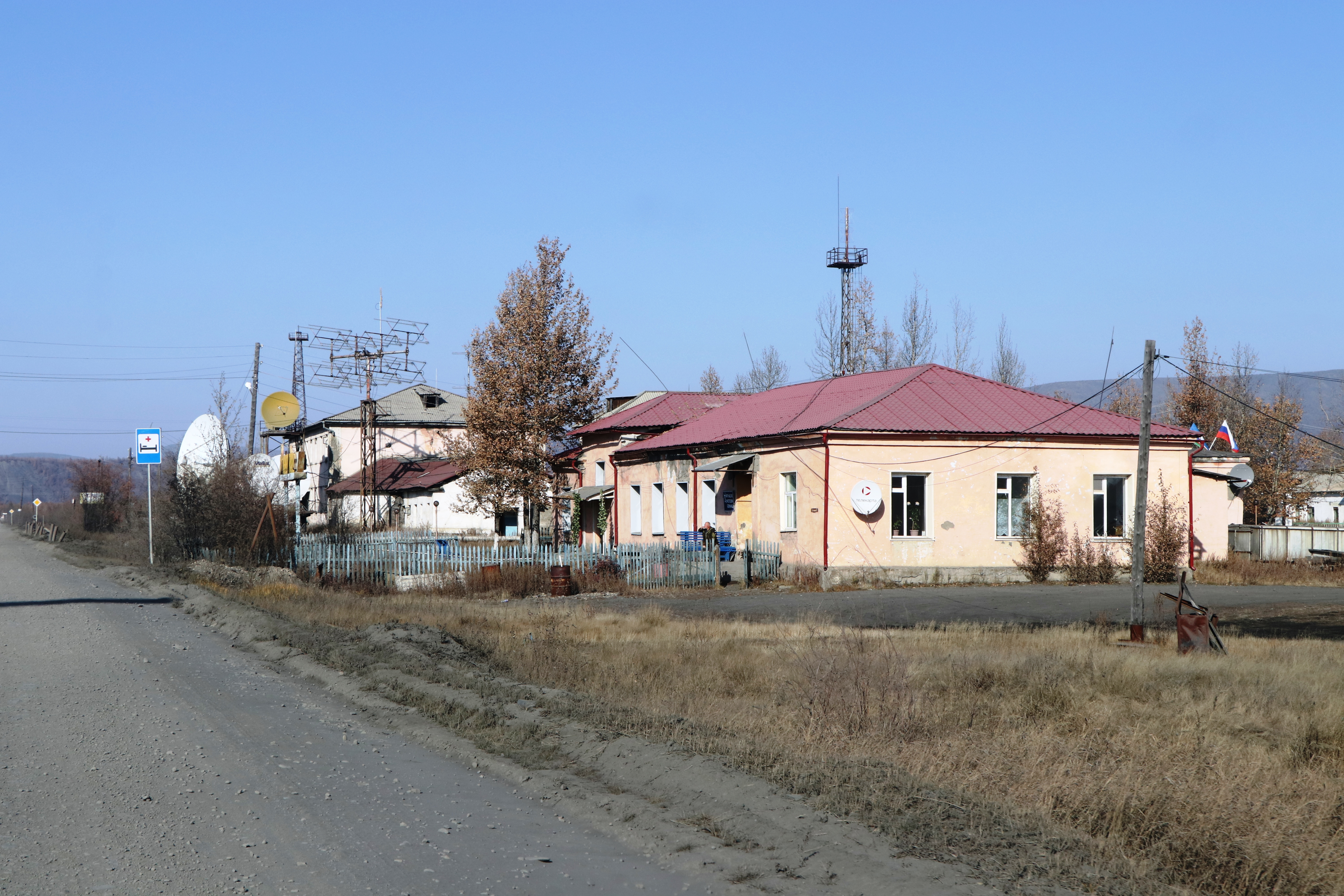
- Artyk, 2021
- Interactive map of Artyk
- Location of Artyk Artyk (Sakha Republic)
- Coordinates: 64°10′45″N 145°07′45″E
- Country: Russia
- Federal subject: Sakha Republic
- Administrative district: Oymyakonsky District
- SettlementSelsoviet: Settlement of Artyk
- 1930s: 1957 (Julian)
- Urban-type settlement status since: 1957
- Elevation: 736 m (2,415 ft)

Population (2010 Census)
  - Total: 509
  - Estimate (2023): 336 (−34%)

Administrative status
  - Capital of: Settlement of Artyk

Municipal status
  - Municipal district: Oymyakonsky Municipal District
  - Urban settlement: Artyk Urban Settlement
  - Capital of: Artyk Urban Settlement
- Time zone: UTC+
- Postal code: 678735
- OKTMO ID: 98639153051

Artyk population
- 2010 Census: 509
- 2002 Census: 633
- 1989 Census: 2,420
- 1979 Census: 1,924

Artyk (Russian: А́ртык, Yakut: Аартык, romanized: Aartık) is an urban locality (an urban-type settlement) in Oymyakonsky District of the Sakha Republic, Russia, located 130 kilometers (81 mi) from Ust-Nera, the administrative center of the district, on the right bank of the Nera River, just above the mouth of its tributary the Artyk, after which the urban-type settlement is named. As of the 2010 Census, its population was 509.

== History ==
It was founded in the 1930s as a base for construction of the Kolyma Highway. It was granted urban-type settlement status in 1957. After the dissolution of the Soviet Union, most of the inhabitants moved elsewhere and the population plunged by 75% during the 1990s.

== Administrative and municipal status ==
Within the framework of administrative divisions, the urban-type settlement of Artyk, together with one rural locality (the selo of Delyankir), is incorporated within Oymyakonsky District as the Settlement of Artyk. As a municipal division, the Settlement of Artyk is incorporated within Oymyakonsky Municipal District as Artyk Urban Settlement.
