= Kuydusun (river) =

River in Yakutia, Russia

Kuydusun Куйдусун / Куйдуһун
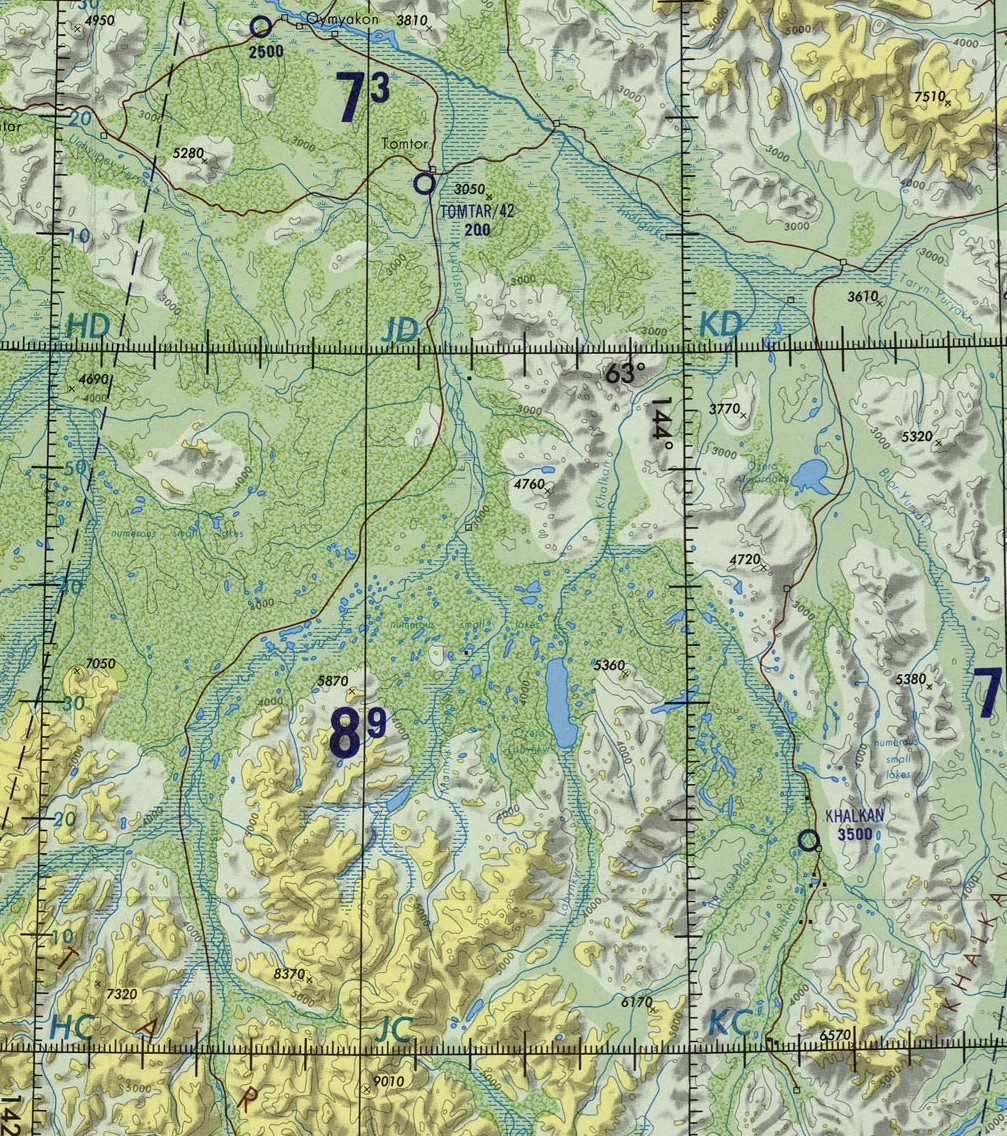
- Course of the Kuydusun ONC map section

- Mouth location in Yakutia, Russia

Location
- Country: Russia

Physical characteristics
- Source
  - location: Suntar-Khayata
  - coordinates: 61°54′10″N 142°32′29″E
- Mouth: Indigirka
  - coordinates: 63°24′05″N 143°15′18″E
- Length: 247 km (153 mi)
- Basin size: 20,400 km^{2} (7,900 sq mi)
- Discharge
  - average: 33 m^{3}/s (1,200 cu ft/s)

Basin features
- Progression: Indigirka → Laptev Sea

The Kuydusun (Russian: Куйдусун; Yakut: Куйдуһун, Kuyduhun) is a river in Sakha Republic (Yakutia), Russia. It is one of the major tributaries of the Indigirka. The river has a length of 247 kilometres (153 mi) and a drainage basin area of 20,400 square kilometres (7,900 mi^{2}).

The river flows south of the Arctic Circle, across desolate tundra territories of the Oymyakonsky District marked by permafrost. Kuydusun village is located by the banks of the lower course of the river and Tomtor further north, near its mouth.

== Course ==
The Kuydusun is a left tributary of the Indigirka. It has its sources in the northeastern slopes of the Suntar-Khayata, at the border with Khabarovsk Krai. The river flows roughly in a northern direction across the mountainous territory, then turns northeastwards into a plain of the Yana-Oymyakon Highlands filled with lakes where it meanders and divides into multiple channels. In its final stretch the river turns again northwards. Finally the Kuydusun joins the left bank of the Indigirka 1,674 km (1,040 mi) from its mouth.

=== Tributaries ===
The main tributaries of the Kuydusun are the 94 km (58 mi) long Mannyk-Yuryakh on the right, as well as the 68 km (42 mi) long Buor-Yuryakh on the left. The river is frozen between early October and the end of May. There are more than 20,000 lakes in its basin with a total area of 81 km^{2} (31 sq mi), as well as 60 ice fields, with a total area of 140 km^{2} (54 sq mi).

== See also ==
- List of rivers of Russia
