= Kuydusun =

Kuydusun Куйдусун
- Selo
- Interactive map of Kuydusun
- Location of Kuydusun Kuydusun (Sakha Republic)
- Coordinates: 63°16′N 143°16′E
- Country: Russia
- Federal subject: Sakha Republic
- Administrative district: Oymyakonsky District
- Rural okrugSelsoviet: Borogonsky 2-y Rural Okrug

Population
  - Estimate (2002): 139 )

Municipal status
  - Municipal district: Oymyakonsky Municipal District
  - Rural settlement: Borogonsky 2-y Rural Settlement
- Time zone: UTC+
- Postal code: 678747
- OKTMO ID: 98639410116

Kuydusun (Russian: Куйдусун; Yakut: Куйдуһун, Kuyduhun) is a rural locality (a selo) in Borogonsky 2-y Rural Okrug of Oymyakonsky District in the Sakha Republic, Russia, located 567 kilometers (352 mi) from Ust-Nera, the administrative center of the district, and 3 kilometers (1.9 mi) from Tomtor, the administrative center of the rural okrug. Its population as of the 2002 Census was 139.

== Geography ==
The village is located on the left bank of the Kuydusun, a tributary of the Indigirka. There is a bridge over the river east of the village.
