= Verkhoyansk mine =

Silver mine in Russia

- Location: Sakha Republic, Russia
- Products: Silver

The Verkhoyansk mine (Russian: Верхоянский рудник, Verkhoyanskiy rudnik) is one of the largest silver mines in Russia and in the world. The mine is located in Sakha Republic. The mine has estimated reserves of 704 million oz of silver.
