= Tomtor, Oymyakonsky District, Sakha Republic =

Tomtor Томтор
- Selo
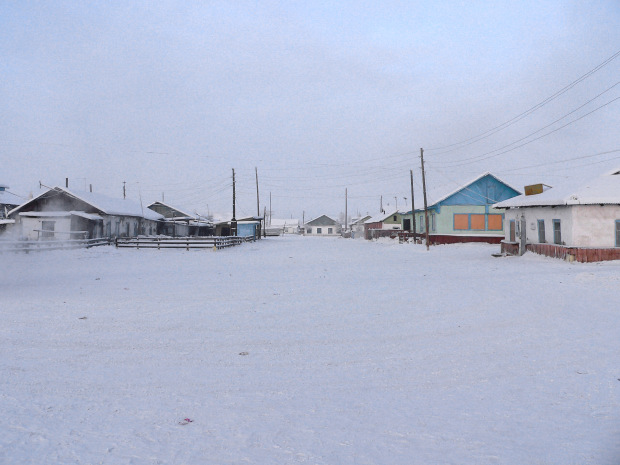
- Tomtor during the winter
- Interactive map of Tomtor
- Location of Tomtor Tomtor (Sakha Republic)
- Coordinates: 63°15′46″N 143°12′39″E
- Country: Russia
- Federal subject: Sakha Republic
- Administrative district: Oymyakonsky District
- Rural okrugSelsoviet: Second Borogonsky Rural Okrug

Population
  - Estimate (2002): 1,256 )

Administrative status
  - Capital of: Second Borogonsky Rural Okrug

Municipal status
  - Municipal district: Oymyakonsky Municipal District
  - Rural settlement: Second Borogonsky Rural Settlement
  - Capital of: Second Borogonsky Rural Settlement
- Time zone: UTC+
- Postal code: 678750
- OKTMO ID: 98639410101

Tomtor (Russian: Томтор; Yakut: Томтор) is a rural locality (a selo), the administrative centre of, and one of four settlements in addition to Aeroport, Agayakan and Kuydusun in Borogonsky Second Rural Okrug of Oymyakonsky District in the Sakha Republic, Russia. It is located 570 kilometers (350 mi) from Ust-Nera, the administrative center of the district. Its population as of the 2002 census was 1,256.

== Geography ==
Tomtor is located near the left bank of the Kuydusun river, not far from its mouth in the Indigirka.

=== Climate ===
Tomtor has a monsoon-influenced extreme subarctic climate (Dwd in the Köppen climate classification).

Climate data for Tomtor
Month	Jan	Feb	Mar	Apr	May	Jun	Jul	Aug	Sep	Oct	Nov	Dec	Year
Mean daily maximum °C (°F)	−36.9 (−34.4)	−30.3 (−22.5)	−15.6 (3.9)	−3.4 (25.9)	7.8 (46.0)	16.7 (62.1)	19.9 (67.8)	15.8 (60.4)	6.7 (44.1)	−8.1 (17.4)	−26.8 (−16.2)	−35.9 (−32.6)	−7.5 (18.5)
Daily mean °C (°F)	−39.6 (−39.3)	−35.3 (−31.5)	−22.4 (−8.3)	−9.8 (14.4)	2.9 (37.2)	12 (54)	15.3 (59.5)	11.5 (52.7)	2.7 (36.9)	−12.1 (10.2)	−29.9 (−21.8)	−38.3 (−36.9)	−11.9 (10.6)
Mean daily minimum °C (°F)	−42.7 (−44.9)	−40.4 (−40.7)	−30.1 (−22.2)	−17.7 (0.1)	−2.8 (27.0)	6.1 (43.0)	9.6 (49.3)	6.6 (43.9)	−0.9 (30.4)	−15.8 (3.6)	−33.1 (−27.6)	−40.8 (−41.4)	−16.8 (1.7)
Average precipitation mm (inches)	7 (0.3)	6 (0.2)	8 (0.3)	15 (0.6)	33 (1.3)	61 (2.4)	71 (2.8)	67 (2.6)	44 (1.7)	19 (0.7)	13 (0.5)	7 (0.3)	351 (13.7)
Source: https://en.climate-data.org/asia/russian-federation/sakha-republic/tomtor-45101/
