= Artyk, Turkmenistan =

Artyk Artyk obasy
- Village
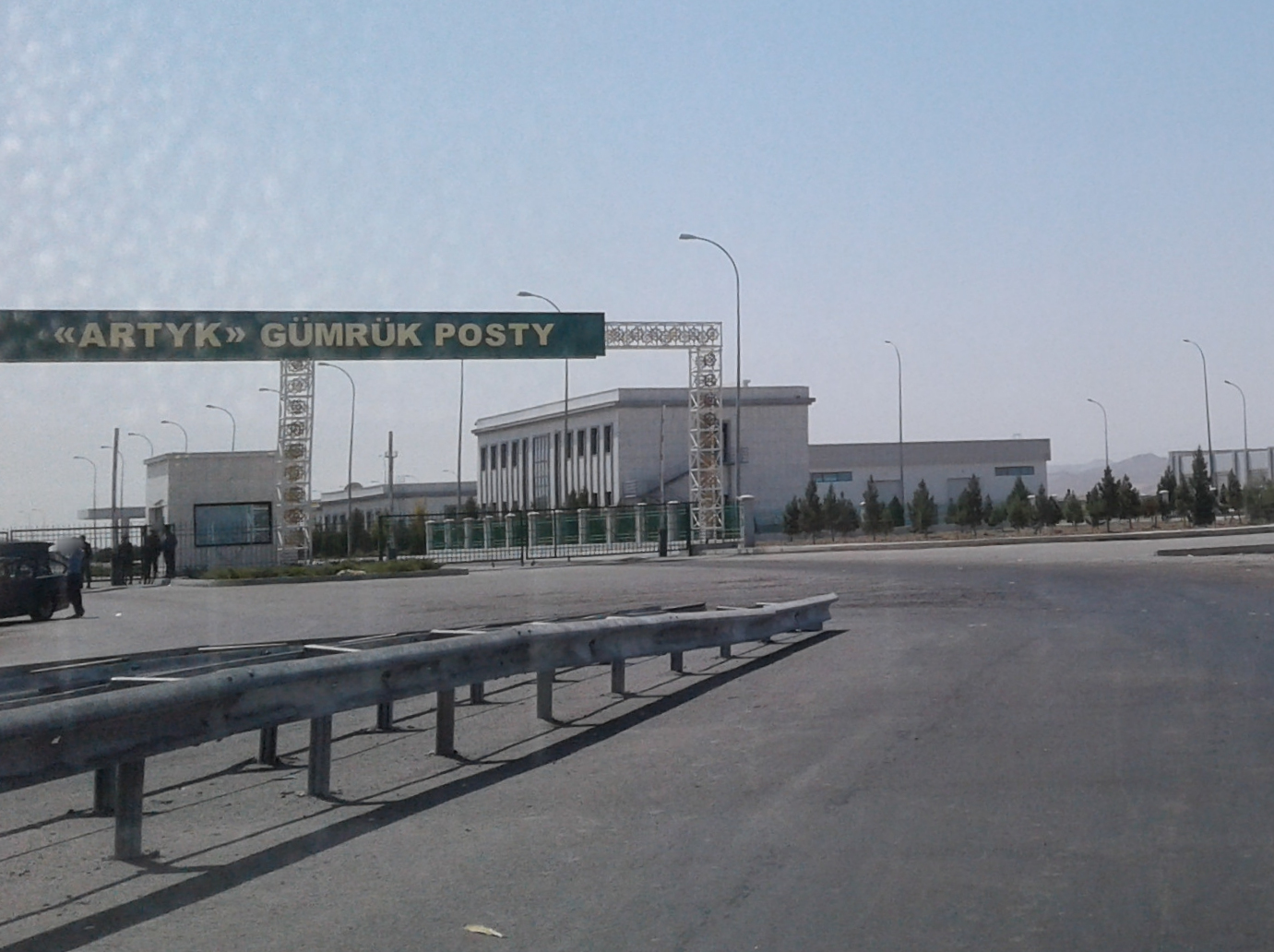
- Customs post on the Turkmen-Iranian border at Artyk

- Location in Turkmenistan
- Coordinates: 37°33′15″N 59°19′36″E
- Country: Turkmenistan
- Province: Ahal Province
- District: Kaka District
- Rural council: Artyk geňeşligi

Population (2022 official census)
  - Total: 2,466
- Time zone: UTC+5

Artyk is a village in Kaka District, Ahal Province, Turkmenistan. It is primarily noteworthy as a border crossing into Iran at Lotfabad, one of three such crossings in Ahal Province. In 2022, it had a population of 2,466 people.

== Etymology ==
The word artyk means "excess" in Turkmen. It was the name of one of the first settlers in this area.
