= Oymyakonsky District =

Oymyakonsky District Оймяконский улус (Russian)
- District

Other transcription(s)
  - Sakha: Өймөкөөн улууhа
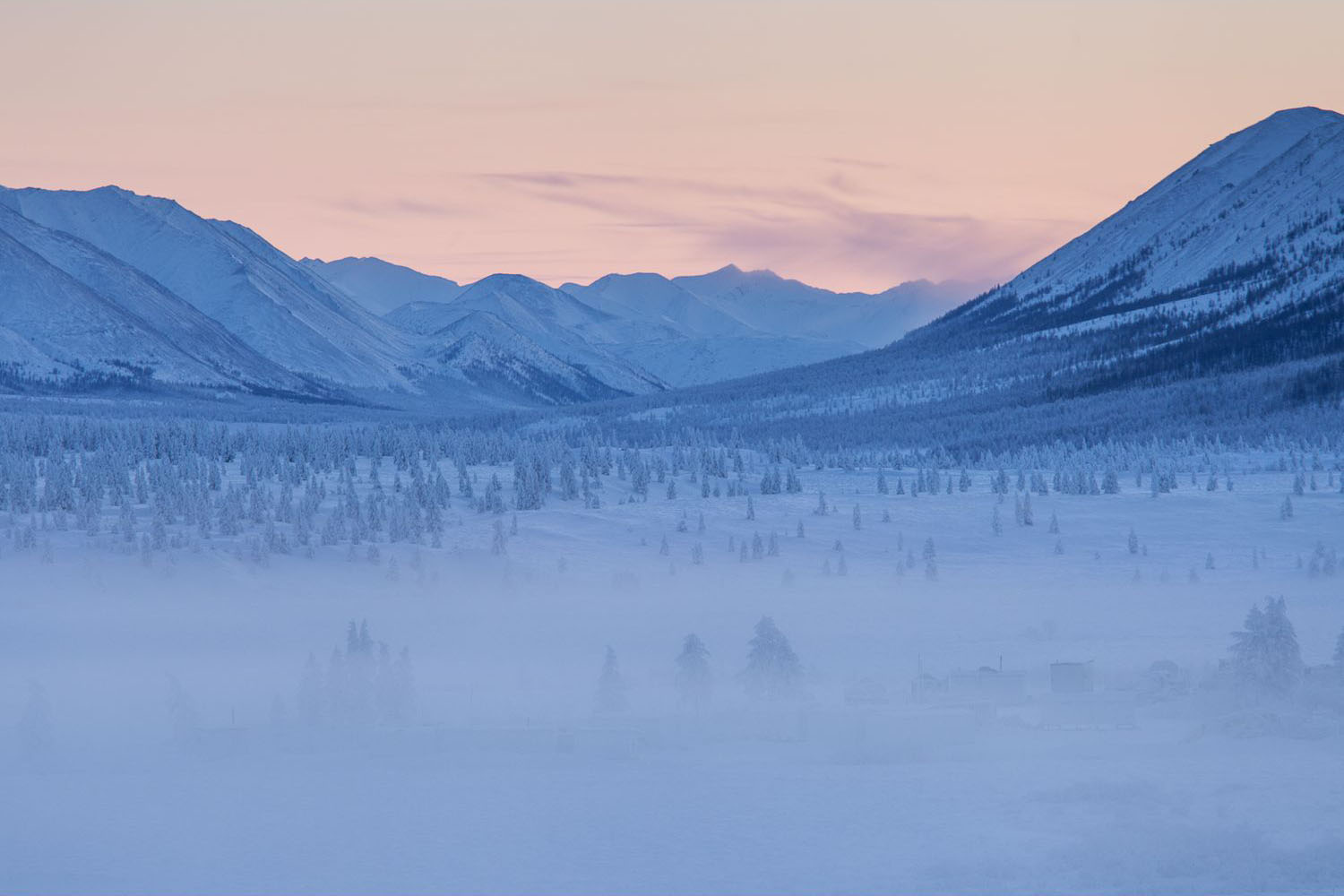
- Near Oymyakon, Oymyakonsky District

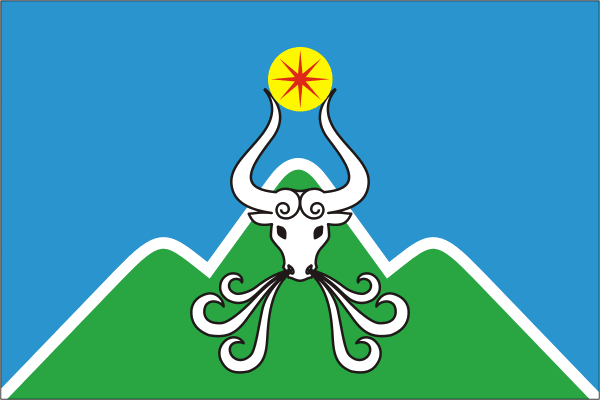
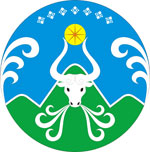
- Flag Coat of arms
- Location of Oymyakonsky District in the Sakha Republic
- Coordinates: 63°27′N 142°47′E
- Country: Russia
- Federal subject: Sakha Republic
- Established: May 20, 1931
- Administrative center: Ust-Nera

Area
  - Total: 92,300 km^{2} (35,600 sq mi)

Population (2010 Census)
  - Total: 10,109
  - Density: 0.110/km^{2} (0.284/sq mi)
  - Urban: 69.0%
  - Rural: 31.0%

Administrative structure
  - Administrative divisions: 2 Settlements, 5 Rural okrugs
  - Inhabited localities: 2 urban-type settlements, 13 rural localities

Municipal structure
  - Municipally incorporated as: Oymyakonsky Municipal District
  - Municipal divisions: 2 urban settlements, 5 rural settlements
- Time zone: UTC+
- OKTMO ID: 98639000
- Website: https://mr-ojmjakonskij.sakha.gov.ru/

Oymyakonsky District (Russian: Оймяко́нский улу́с; Yakut: Өймөкөөн улууһа, Öymököön uluuha, [øjmøkøːn uluːha]) is an administrative and municipal district (raion, or ulus), one of the thirty-four in the Sakha Republic, Russia. It is located in the east of the republic and borders with Ust-Maysky District in the southwest, Tomponsky District in the west, Momsky District in the north, Susumansky District of Magadan Oblast in the east, and with Okhotsky District of Khabarovsk Krai in the south. The area of the district is 92,300 square kilometers (35,600 sq mi). Its administrative center is the urban locality (a settlement) of Ust-Nera. Population: 10,109 (2010 census); 14,670 (2002 Census); 31,078 (1989 Soviet census). The population of Ust-Nera accounts for 63.9% of the district's total population.

== Geography ==
The landscape of the district is mostly mountainous. The Nera Plateau is located in the eastern part of the district, the Tas-Kystabyt Range in the central area, the Oymyakon Highlands and the Elgin Plateau in the west, the Suntar-Khayata Range at the southwestern end and some ranges of the Chersky mountain system in the north. The main river is the Indigirka, with its tributaries Kuydusun and Kyuyente —with the Agayakan and the Suntar, among others. The entire territory of the district is part of the Indigirka River basin. There are many lakes in the district, with Labynkyr Lake in particular being famous for its mythical Labynkyr monster.

=== Climate ===
The rural locality of Oymyakon is the Pole of Cold of the northern hemisphere, with the temperature of −67.7 °C (−89.9 °F) having been recorded in February 1933. Average January temperature ranges from −41 to −51 °C (−42 to −60 °F). Average July temperature ranges from +8 to +19 °C (46 to 66 °F). Average precipitation ranges from 150–200 millimeters (5.9–7.9 in) in the valleys to 600 millimeters (24 in) in the mountains.

== History ==
The district was established on May 20, 1931.

== Demographics ==
Historical population
Year	Pop.	±%
1970	21,364	—
1979	25,731	+20.4%
1989	31,078	+20.8%
2002	14,670	−52.8%
2010	10,109	−31.1%
2021	7,730	−23.5%
Source: Census data

As of the 2021 Census, the ethnic composition was as follows:

- Yakuts: 42.3%
- Russians: 40.7%
- Evens: 7.5%
- Ukrainians: 2.3%
- Buryats: 1.1%
- others: 6.1%

== Economy ==
The economy of the district is based mostly on mining and agriculture. There are deposits of gold, silver, tin, tungsten, lead, zinc, and antimony in the district.

=== Transportation ===
The M56 Kolyma Highway runs through the district, connecting it with Yakutsk and Magadan.

== Inhabited localities ==
Municipal composition
Towns	Population	Male	Female	Inhabited localities in jurisdiction
Artyk (Артык)	512	274 (53.5%)	238 (46.5%)	**Urban-type settlement of Artyk**; selo of Delyankir
Ust Nera (Усть-Нера)	6972	3915 (56.2%)	3057 (43.6%)	Urban-type settlement of Ust-Nera (administrative centre of the district)
Rural settlements	Population	Male	Female	Rural localities in jurisdiction*
First Borogonsky Nasleg (Борогонский 1-й наслег)	761	386 (50.7%)	375 (49.3%)	**selo of Oymyakon**; selo of Bereg-Yurdya; selo of Khara-Tumul
Second Borogonsky Nasleg (Борогонский 2-й наслег)	1366	630 (46.1%)	736 (53.9%)	**selo of Tomtor**; selo of Agayakan; selo of Aeroport; selo of Kuydusun
Sordonnokhsky Nasleg (Сордоннохский наслег)	330	174 (52.7%)	156 (47.3%)	**selo of Orto-Balagan**; selo of Kuranakh-Sala
Teryutsky Nasleg (Терютский наслег)	355	178 (50.1%)	177 (49.9%)	**selo of Teryut**
Yuchyugeysky Nasleg (Ючюгейский наслег)	322	164 (50.9%)	158 (49.1%)	**selo of Yuchyugey**; selo of Kyubeme

Divisional source:
Population source:
*Administrative centers are shown in bold
