= Pole of Cold =

Coldest locations in each hemisphere

The Poles of Cold are the places in the Southern and Northern hemispheres where the lowest air temperatures have been recorded.

== Southern Hemisphere ==
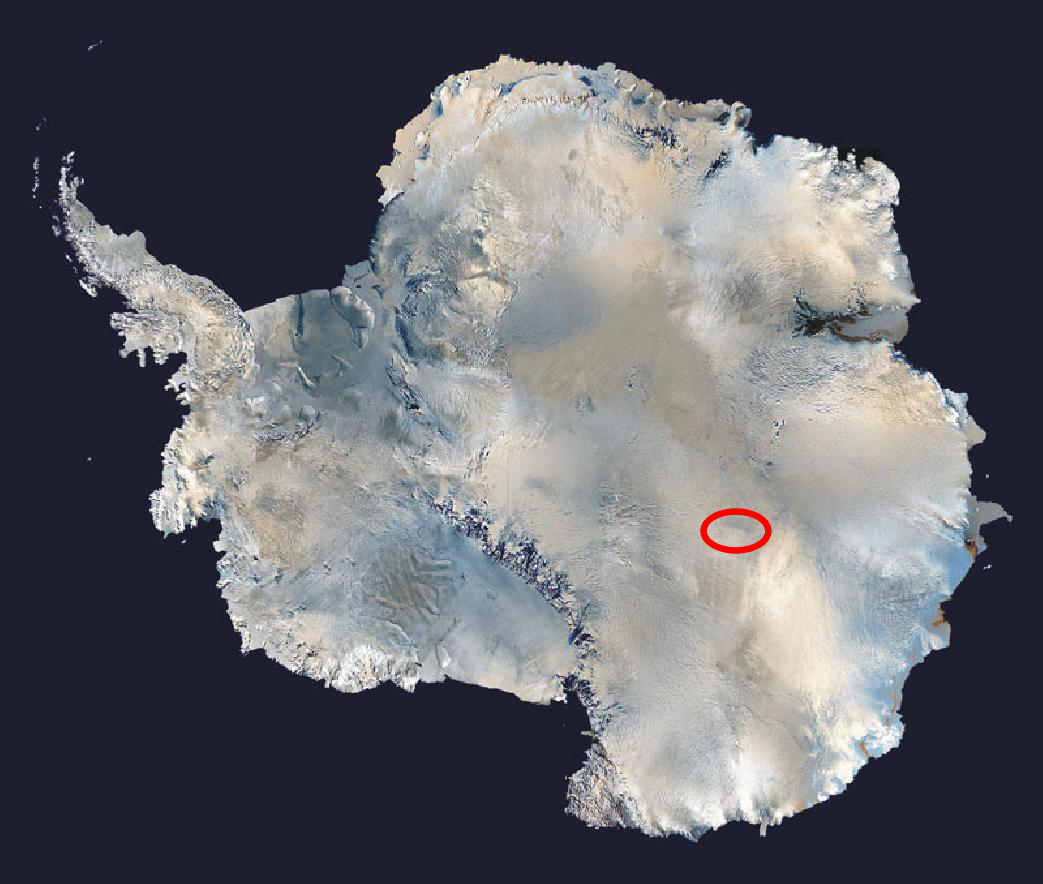
Lake Vostok composite image (NASA)

In the Southern Hemisphere, the Pole of Cold is currently located in Antarctica, at the Russian (formerly Soviet) Antarctic station Vostok at 78°28′S 106°48′E. On July 21, 1983, this station recorded a temperature of −89.2 °C (−128.6 °F). This is the lowest naturally occurring temperature ever recorded on Earth. Vostok station is located at the elevation of 3,488 m (11,444 ft) above sea level, far removed from the moderating influence of oceans (more than 1,000 km [620 mi] from the nearest sea coast), and high latitude that results in almost three months of civil polar night every year (early May to end of July), all combine to produce an environment where temperatures rarely rise above −25 °C (−13 °F) during summer and frequently fall below −70 °C (−94 °F) in winter. By comparison, the South Pole, due to its lower elevation, is, on average, 5 to 10 °C (9 to 18 °F) warmer than Vostok, and the lowest temperature ever recorded at the South Pole is −82.8 °C (−117 °F).

It is generally thought that Vostok is not the coldest place in Antarctica, and there are locations (notably, Dome A) that are modestly colder on average. The now inactive Plateau Station, located on the central Antarctic plateau, recorded an average yearly temperature that was consistently lower than that of Vostok Station during the 37-month period that it was active in the late 1960s, with its average for the coldest month being several degrees lower than the same statistic for Vostok. Plateau Station never recorded a temperature that surpassed the record low set at Vostok. However, temperatures at Plateau Station were only recorded during the 37 months that it was active. Had a lower temperature than the Vostok record occurred there at a later date, it would never have been recorded.

Monitoring stations in Antarctica are few and far between; prior to 1995, Vostok was the only research station on the Antarctic Plateau above the elevation of 3,000 m (with the exception of Plateau Station during the brief period that it was active in the 1960s), with no other stations for several hundred kilometers in any direction. Temperatures below −89.2 °C (−128.6 °F), if they did occur elsewhere, would not have been recorded. The automatic weather station at Dome A was only installed in 2005, and has recorded −82.5 °C (−116.5 °F) as the coldest so far (2010). However, a review of satellite measurements taken between 2010 and 2013 found several places located along a ridge between Dome A and Dome F which recorded even lower temperatures of −92 to −94 °C (−134 to −137 °F), with the lowest reliable temperature being −93.2 °C (−135.8 °F) recorded in 2010, at 81°48′S 59°18′E, at an elevation of 3,900 m (12,800 ft). The extreme low temperatures are found in hollows slightly below the peak of the ice ridge, where cold air gets trapped as it flows downhill, and since the same low temperature ranges were detected at several different sites along the ridge across multiple years, it is thought this may be the lowest temperature achievable under local atmospheric conditions.

== Northern Hemisphere ==
In the Northern Hemisphere, there are two towns in Sakha, Russia that compete for the title of "Pole of Cold". These are Verkhoyansk (located at 67°33′N 133°23′E, altitude 127 metres (417 ft)) and Oymyakon (located at 63°15′N 143°9′E, altitude 745 metres (2,444 ft)). However, the World Meteorological Organization has recognized in 2020 a temperature of −69.6 °C (−93.3 °F), measured near the topographic summit of the Greenland Ice Sheet on 22 December 1991, as the lowest in the Northern Hemisphere. The record was measured at an automatic weather station and was uncovered after nearly 30 years.

In December 1868 and then in February 1869 Ivan Khudyakov made the discovery of the Northern Pole of Cold by measuring a record temperature of −63.2 °C (−81.8 °F) in Verkhoyansk. Later, on January 15, 1885, a temperature of −67.8 °C (−90.0 °F) was registered there by Sergey Kovalik. This measurement was published in the Annals of the General Physical Observatory in 1892; by mistake it was written as −69.8 °C (−93.6 °F), which was later corrected. One can still find this incorrect value in some literature. The coldest reliably measured temperature in Verkhoyansk was −67.8 °C (−90.0 °F) on February 5 and 7 of 1892.

On February 6, 1933, a temperature of −67.7 °C (−89.9 °F) was recorded at Oymyakon's weather station. At the time, this was the coldest reliably measured temperature for the Northern Hemisphere. The weather station is in a valley between Oymyakon and Tomtor. The station is at 750 m (2,460 ft) and the surrounding mountains at 1,100 m (3,600 ft), causing cold air to pool in the valley: recent studies show that winter temperatures in the area increase with elevation by as much as 10 °C (18 °F). The average temperature in Oymyakon has risen about 2.7 degrees Celsius since preindustrial times.

On December 22, 1991, the Klinck Automatic Weather Station (AWS) (located at 72°31′N 40°48′W, altitude 3,105 metres (10,187 ft)) in Greenland recorded a temperature of −69.6 °C (−93.3 °F). The WMO validated the metadata and observations and was able to conclude that the observation was credible in terms of instrument calibration, monitoring of the station and the synoptic situation. The WMO Rapporteur accepted the observation as the officially lowest observed near‐surface air temperature for the Northern and Western Hemispheres.

== See also ==
- List of weather records
- Lowest temperature recorded on Earth
- Life in the Freezer
- Coldest place in the universe
