= Oymyakon =

Selo in Sakha Republic, Russia

Oymyakon Оймякон
- Selo

Other transcription(s)
  - Yakut: Өймөкөөн
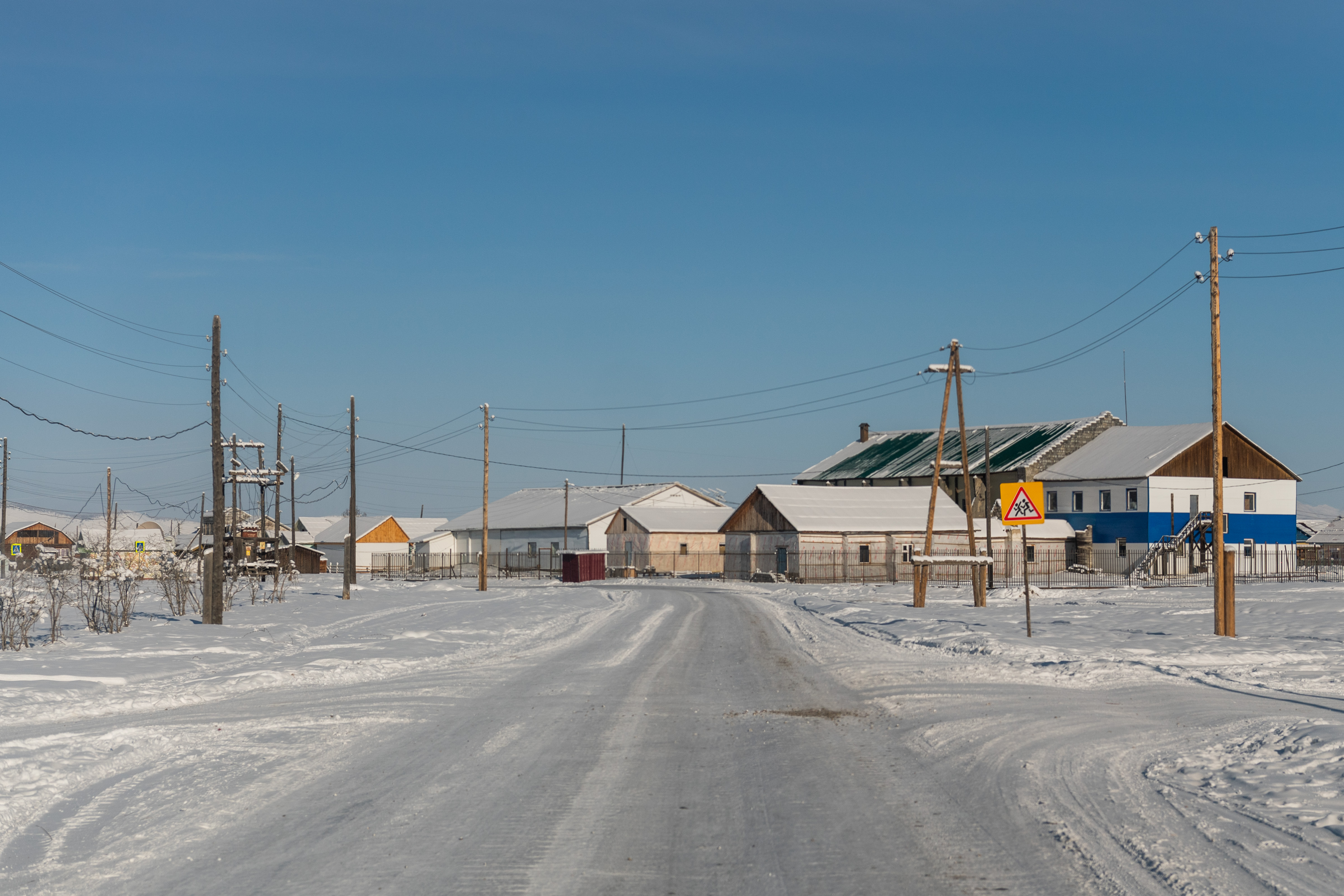
- Interactive map of Oymyakon
- Location of Oymyakon Oymyakon (Sakha Republic)
- Coordinates: 63°27′39″N 142°47′09″E
- Country: Russia
- Federal subject: Sakha Republic
- Administrative district: Oymyakonsky District
- Elevation: 745 m (2,444 ft)

Population (2010 Census)
  - Total: 462
  - Estimate (2021): 560 (+21.2%)

Municipal status
  - Municipal district: Oymyakonsky Municipal District
- Time zone: UTC+
- Postal code: 678752
- Dialing code: +7 41154
- OKTMO ID: 98639405101

Oymyakon (Note: Russian: Оймяко́н, pronounced [ojmʲɪˈkon], [ɐjmʲɪˈkon]; Yakut: Өймөкөөн, Öymököön, Yakut pronunciation: [øjmøˈkøːn]) is a rural locality (a selo) in Oymyakonsky District of the Sakha Republic, Russia, located in the Yana-Oymyakon Highlands, along the Indigirka River, 30 km (19 mi) northwest of Tomtor on the Kolyma Highway. Oymyakon is currently the coldest permanently inhabited human settlement on Earth.

== Etymology ==
The settlement is named after the Oymyakon River, whose name reportedly comes from the Even word kheium, meaning "unfrozen patch of water; place where fish spend the winter". However, another source states that the Even word heyum (hэjум, хэюм; kheium may be a misspelling), which means "frozen lake", may be where it gets its name.

== Geography ==
Oymyakon has two main valleys beside it. These valleys trap wind inside the town and create a colder climate. The temperatures here are extremely cold for most of the year, and it snows frequently in spring and autumn, but rarely in summer and winter, due to the Siberian High in winter, and temperatures being commonly above 0 °C (32 °F) in summer. Schools are closed if it is colder than −55 °C (−67 °F).

== History ==
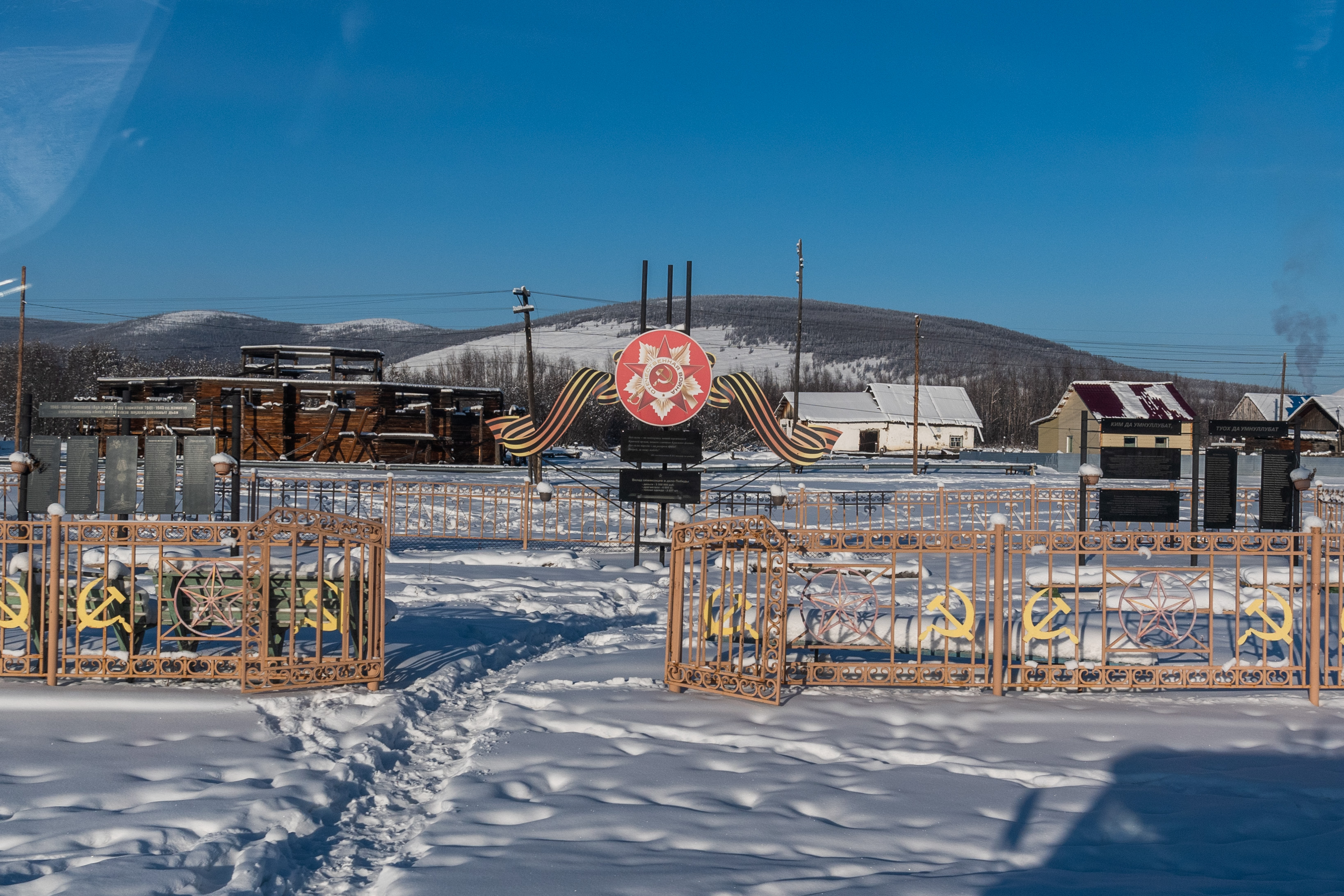
Monument to the "Great Patriotic War", February 2019

During World War II, an airfield was built in the district of Aeroport, for the Alaska-Siberian (ALSIB) air route, used to ferry American Lend-Lease aircraft to the Eastern Front. Oymyakon is located near the historic Road of Bones. Over the last few decades, the population of Oymyakon has shrunk significantly. The village had a peak population of roughly 2,500 inhabitants, but that number has dwindled to fewer than 900 in 2018. The local economy is mostly fur trading and ice fishing.

== Religion ==
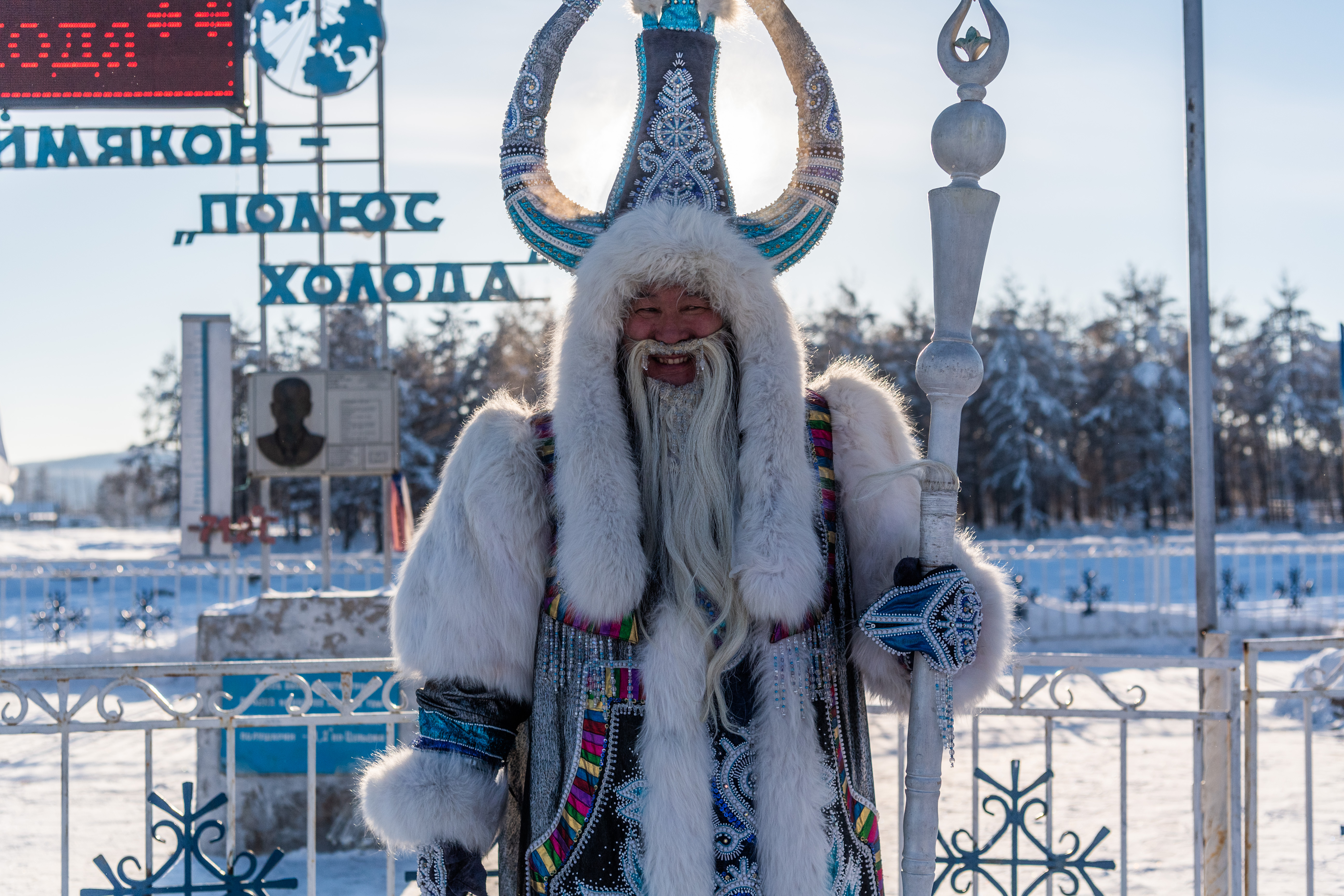
Ayaz Ata (Turkic mythology) dressed as Chyskhaan, the spirit of cold in Yakut mythology

Most inhabitants of Oymyakon are either Orthodox Christians or non-religious. Aiyy Faith and Shamanism also have a presence in the area.

== Climate ==
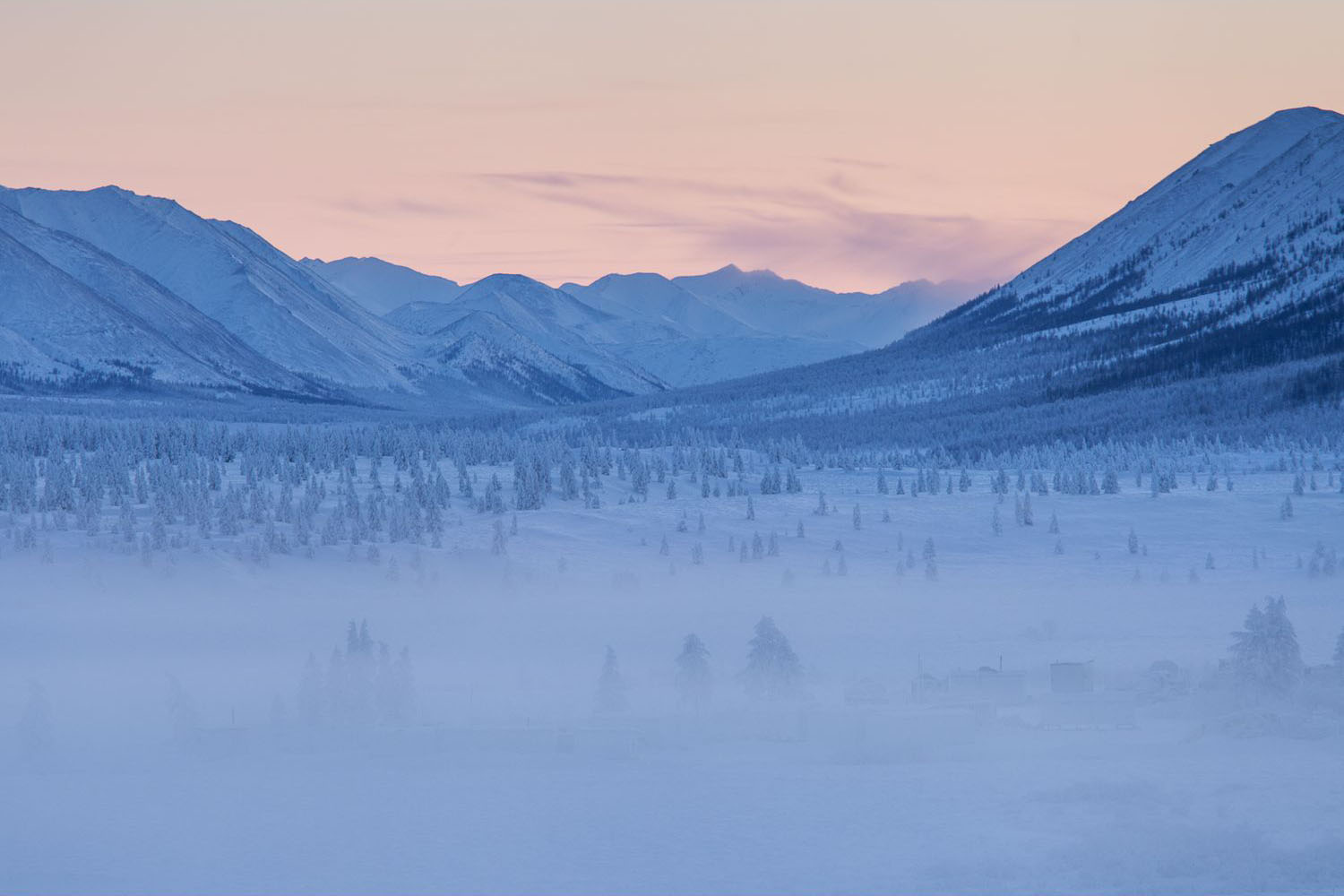
Landscape near Oymyakon in February 2013

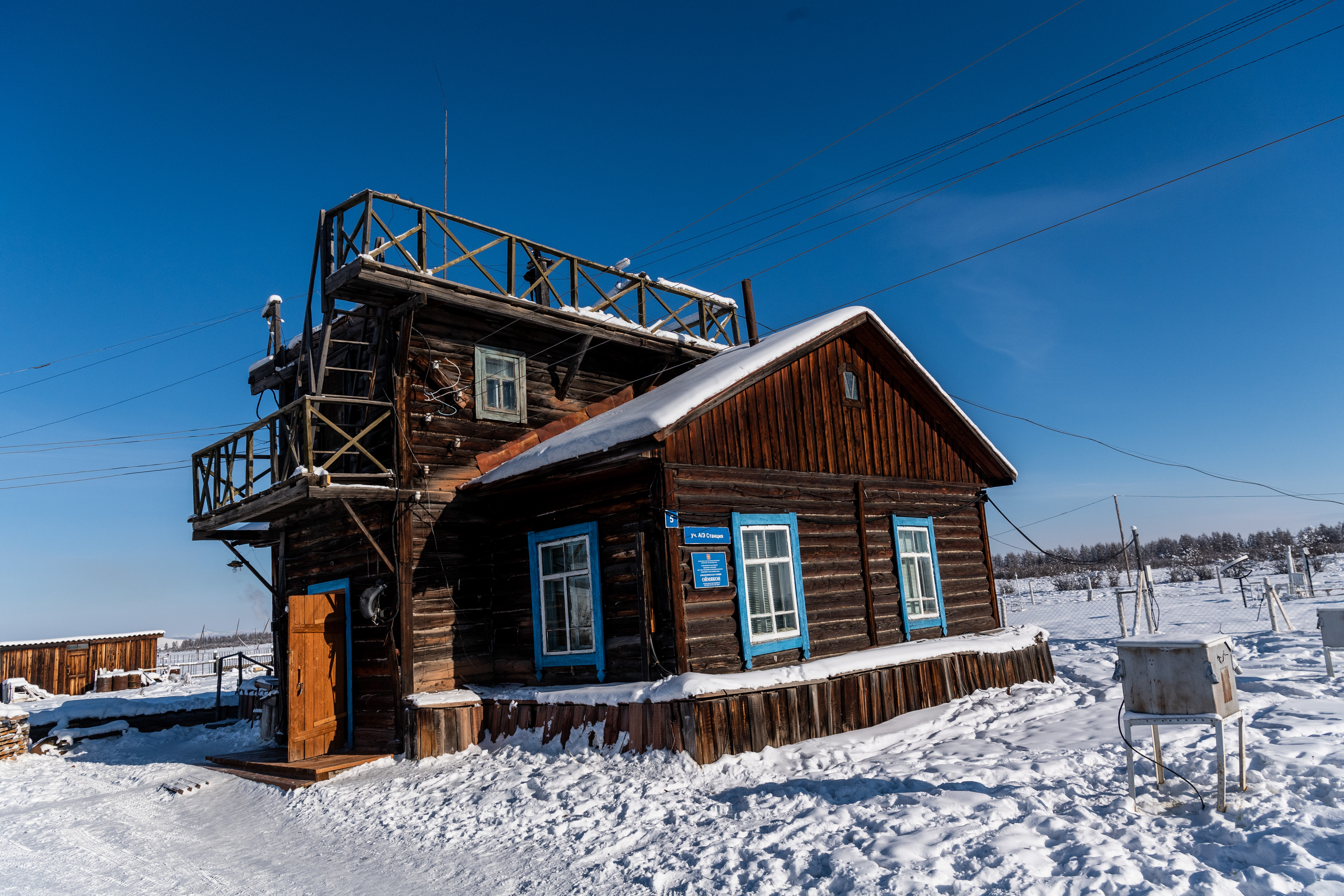
The weather station

With an extreme subarctic climate (Köppen climate classification Dfd, Trewartha climate classification Ecle), Oymyakon is known as one of the places considered the Northern Pole of Cold, the other being the town of Verkhoyansk, located 629 km (391 mi) away by air. The weather station is in a valley between Oymyakon and Tomtor. The station is at 750 m (2,460 ft) above sea level and the surrounding mountains, at 1,100 m (3,600 ft), cause cold air to pool in the valley: in fact, recent studies show that winter temperatures in the area increase with altitude by as much as 10 °C (18 °F). The reason Oymyakon is so cold is due to the fact that the village is surrounded by mountains trapping cold air and not allowing warm winds to come. Another reason is that Oymyakon only receives around a few hours of daylight in the winter, accounting for the extremely low temperatures in the winter. Oymyakon's distance from the ocean can also affect the temperatures. Due to the harsh conditions, the ground is permanently frozen (continuous permafrost).

There is a monument built around the town square commemorating an unofficial reading in January 1924 of −71.2 °C (−96.2 °F). This was shown on the Australian program 60 Minutes in a 2012 documentary. On 6 February 1933, a temperature of −67.7 °C (−89.9 °F) was recorded at Oymyakon's weather station. This was almost the lowest officially recorded temperature in the Northern Hemisphere (Verkhoyansk had recorded −67.8 °C (−90.0 °F) on 5 and 7 February, 1892). Only Antarctica and Greenland have recorded lower official temperatures (the lowest being −89.2 °C (−128.6 °F), recorded at Vostok Station on 21 July 1983).

During some years, the temperature drops below 0 °C (32 °F) in late September and remains below freezing until mid-April. Oymyakon has never recorded an above-freezing temperature between 26 October and 16 March inclusive. In Oymyakon sometimes the average minimum temperature for December, January, and February falls below −50 °C (−58 °F): in the record coldest month of January 1931 the monthly mean was −54.1 °C (−65.4 °F). Sometimes summer months can also be quite chilly, but in June, July, and August, the temperature has never dropped below −14 °C (7 °F), while in June and July, the temperature has never dropped below −10 °C (14 °F). Oymyakon and Verkhoyansk are the only two permanently inhabited places in the world that have recorded temperatures below −60 °C (−76 °F) for every day in January. By contrast July is the month where every day has had temperatures above 30 °C (86 °F). Every day of the year has a record low below freezing, with 9 July having the highest record low at −1.5 °C (29.3 °F). In contrast, 4 January has the lowest record high at −27.9 °C (−18.2 °F).

Although winters in Oymyakon are long and extremely cold, summers are mild to warm, sometimes hot, with cool to cold summer nights. The warmest month on record was July 2022 with an average temperature of 19.3 °C (66.7 °F). In June, July, and August, temperatures over 30 °C (86 °F) are not rare during the day. On 7 July 2022, the warmest night on record was observed, with an overnight minimum of 18.6 °C (65.5 °F). On 28 July 2010, Oymyakon recorded a record high temperature of 34.6 °C (94.3 °F), yielding a temperature range of 102.3 °C (184.1 °F). Verkhoyansk, Yakutsk, Delyankir, Tegyulte, and Fort Vermilion, Canada are the only other known places in the world that have a temperature amplitude higher than 100 °C (180 °F). Fort Yukon, Alaska, falls 1 degree C short of this threshold. Also, Oymyakon is tied with Verkhoyansk for the highest temperature amplitude in the world, and Verkhoyansk is tied with Fort Yukon for the warmest temperature above the Arctic Circle ever, 38 °C (100 °F).

The climate is quite dry, but as average monthly temperatures are below freezing for seven months of the year, substantial evaporation occurs only in summer months. Summers are much wetter than winters. Due to its harsh winters, the plant hardiness zone in Oymyakon is 0a. A small number of trees such as the Dahurian larch can still grow nonetheless.

Climate data for Oymyakon (1991–2020, extremes 1891–present)
Month	Jan	Feb	Mar	Apr	May	Jun	Jul	Aug	Sep	Oct	Nov	Dec	Year
Record high °C (°F)	−16.6 (2.1)	−12.5 (9.5)	3.8 (38.8)	11.7 (53.1)	26.2 (79.2)	31.7 (89.1)	34.6 (94.3)	32.9 (91.2)	23.7 (74.7)	11.0 (51.8)	−2.1 (28.2)	−6.0 (21.2)	34.6 (94.3)
Mean daily maximum °C (°F)	−42.1 (−43.8)	−35.8 (−32.4)	−19.8 (−3.6)	−3.0 (26.6)	9.7 (49.5)	20.0 (68.0)	23.0 (73.4)	18.5 (65.3)	9.1 (48.4)	−8.3 (17.1)	−30.2 (−22.4)	−41.9 (−43.4)	−8.4 (16.9)
Daily mean °C (°F)	−45.7 (−50.3)	−42.2 (−44.0)	−30.2 (−22.4)	−12.7 (9.1)	3.5 (38.3)	12.7 (54.9)	15.3 (59.5)	10.8 (51.4)	2.5 (36.5)	−13.8 (7.2)	−34.4 (−29.9)	−45.0 (−49.0)	−14.9 (5.2)
Mean daily minimum °C (°F)	−49.3 (−56.7)	−47.6 (−53.7)	−39.2 (−38.6)	−22.9 (−9.2)	−3.5 (25.7)	4.4 (39.9)	6.9 (44.4)	3.2 (37.8)	−3.3 (26.1)	−19.2 (−2.6)	−38.8 (−37.8)	−48.3 (−54.9)	−21.5 (−6.7)
Record low °C (°F)	−65.6 (−86.1)	−67.7 (−89.9)	−60.6 (−77.1)	−46.4 (−51.5)	−28.9 (−20.0)	−9.7 (14.5)	−9.3 (15.3)	−17.1 (1.2)	−25.3 (−13.5)	−47.6 (−53.7)	−62.2 (−80.0)	−64.4 (−83.9)	−67.7 (−89.9)
Average precipitation mm (inches)	6 (0.2)	7 (0.3)	5 (0.2)	5 (0.2)	15 (0.6)	39 (1.5)	46 (1.8)	38 (1.5)	24 (0.9)	13 (0.5)	13 (0.5)	7 (0.3)	218 (8.6)
Average extreme snow depth cm (inches)	24 (9.4)	28 (11)	30 (12)	24 (9.4)	3 (1.2)	0 (0)	0 (0)	0 (0)	0 (0)	6 (2.4)	15 (5.9)	20 (7.9)	30 (12)
Average rainy days	0	0	0.03	0.4	10	17	17	18	13	1	0	0	76
Average snowy days	23	23	16	10	9	1	0.2	0.3	9	21	23	20	156
Average relative humidity (%)	77	76	73	68	60	60	66	72	74	80	78	75	72
Mean monthly sunshine hours	35.4	127.5	255.5	314.2	287.7	317.8	308.7	236.0	146.8	114.4	62.8	14.3	2,221.1
Source 1: Погода и Климат, World Meteorological Organization (February record low) (November record low)
Source 2: NOAA

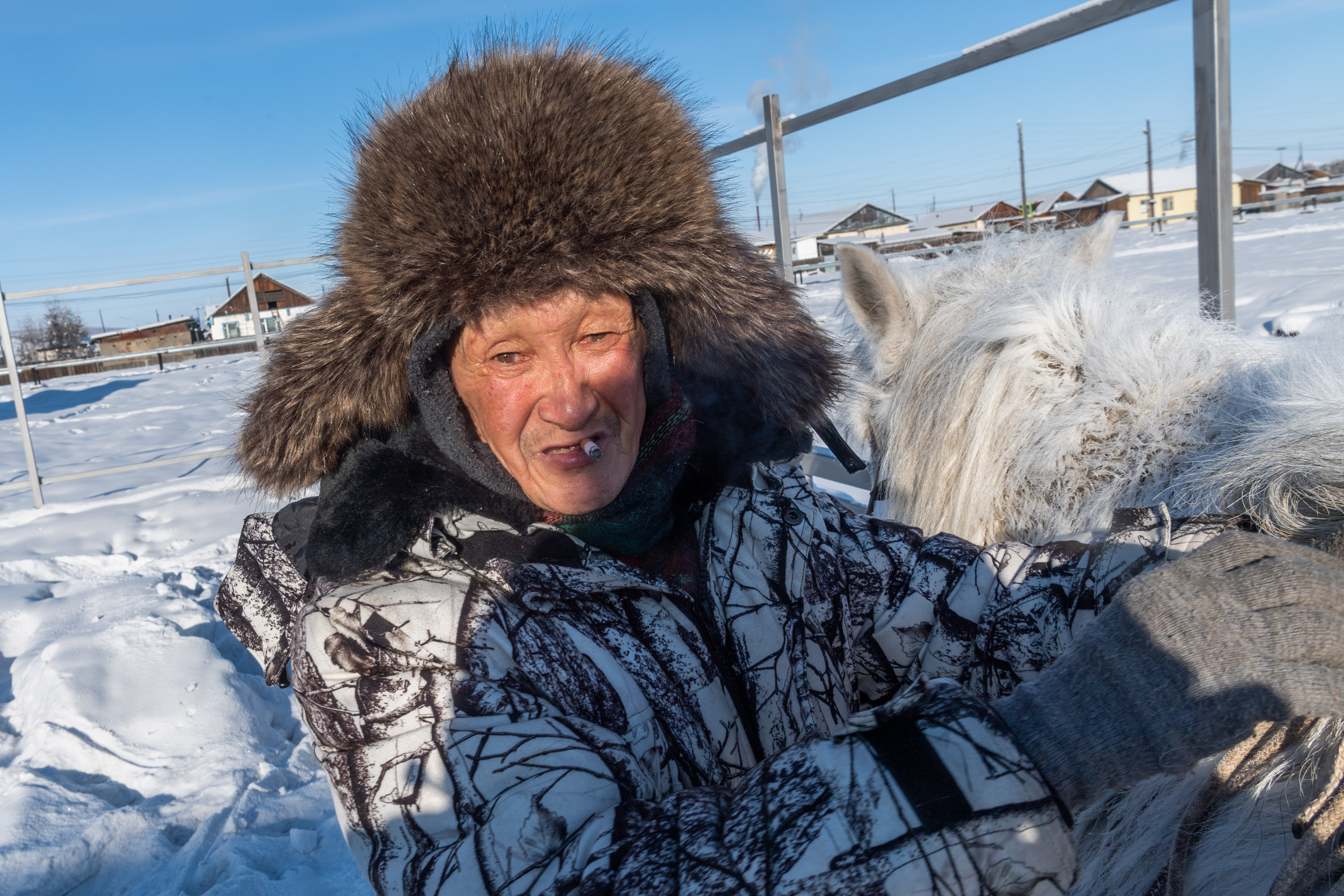
Local man

== See also ==
- Summit Camp
- Oymyakon Plateau
