= Verkhoyansk =

Town in Sakha Republic, Russia

Verkhoyansk Верхоянск
- Town under district jurisdiction

Other transcription(s)
  - Yakut: Верхоянскай
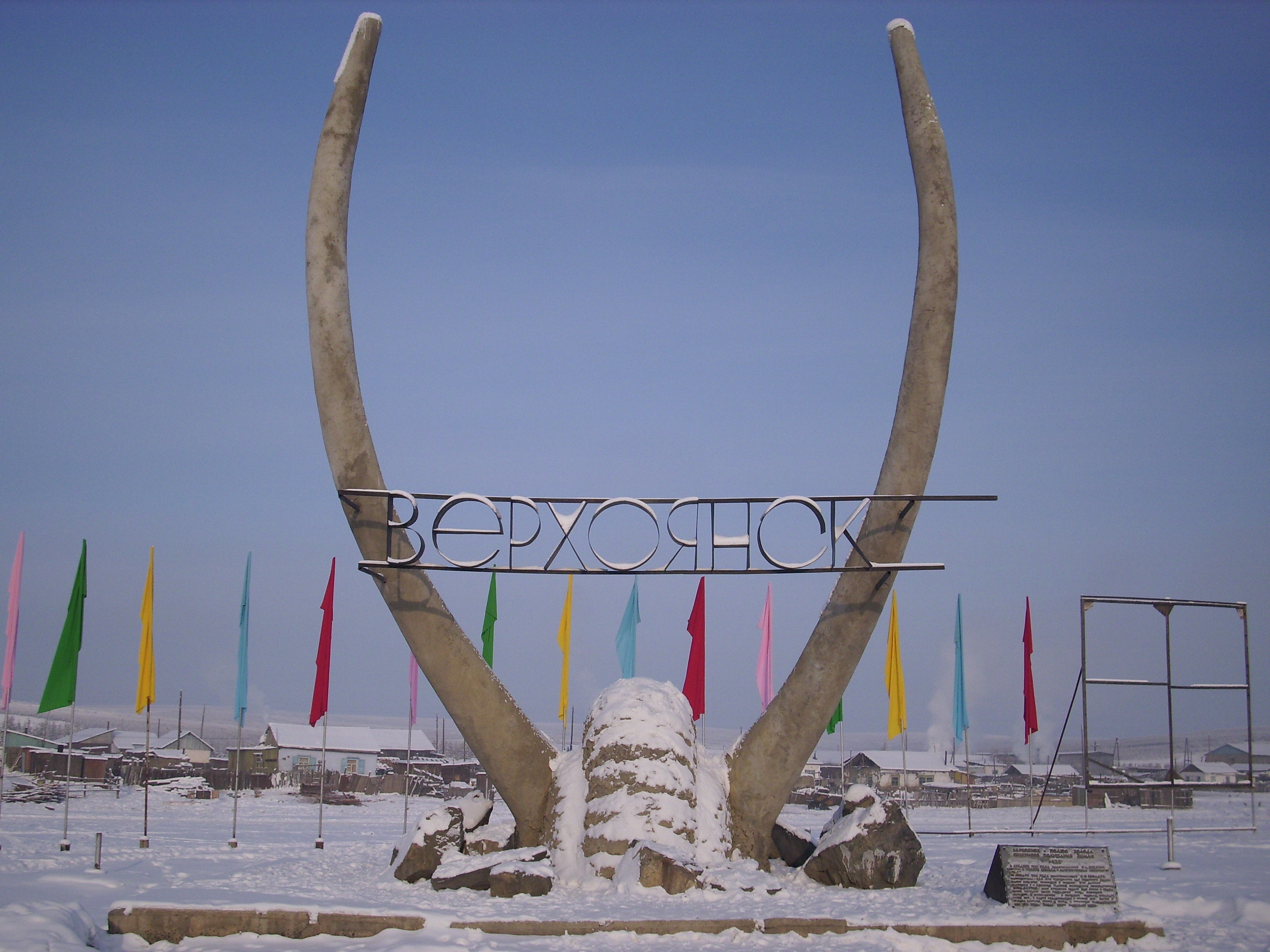
- Pole of Cold in Verkhoyansk

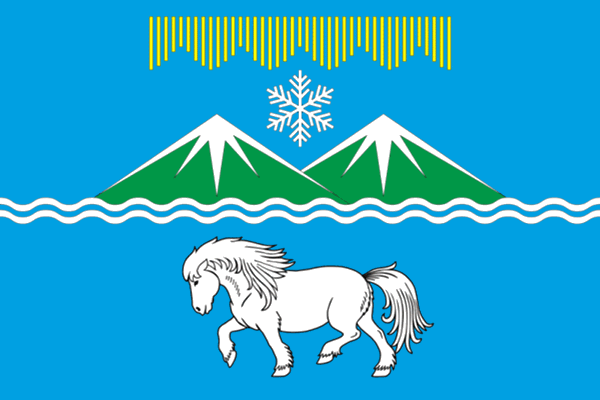
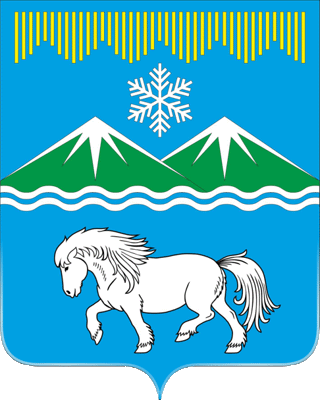
- Flag Coat of arms
- Interactive map of Verkhoyansk
- Location of Verkhoyansk Verkhoyansk (Sakha Republic)
- Coordinates: 67°33′N 133°23′E
- Country: Russia
- Federal subject: Sakha Republic
- Administrative district: Verkhoyansky District
- TownSelsoviet: Verkhoyansk
- Founded: 1638
- Town status since: 1817
- Elevation: 127 m (417 ft)

Population (2010 Census)
  - Total: 1,311
  - Estimate (2025): 745 (−43.2%)

Administrative status
  - Capital of: Town of Verkhoyansk

Municipal status
  - Municipal district: Verkhoyansky Municipal District
  - Urban settlement: Verkhoyansk Urban Settlement
  - Capital of: Verkhoyansk Urban Settlement
- Time zone: UTC+
- Postal code: 678530
- Dialing code: +7 41165
- OKTMO ID: 98616103001

Verkhoyansk population
- 2010 Census: 1,311
- 2002 Census: 1,434
- 1989 Census: 1,883
- 1979 Census: 1,709

Verkhoyansk (Russian: Верхоянск, IPA: [vʲɪrxɐˈjansk]; Yakut: Верхоянскай, romanized: Verxoyanskay) is a town in Verkhoyansky District of the Sakha Republic, Russia, located on the Yana River in the Arctic Circle, 92 kilometers (57 mi) from Batagay, the administrative center of the district, and 675 kilometers (419 mi) north of Yakutsk, the capital of the Sakha republic. As of the 2010 Census, its population was 1,311. Verkhoyansk holds the record for the highest temperature ever recorded north of the Arctic Circle, with 38.0 °C (100.4 °F), and it also holds the record for the lowest temperature ever recorded in Asia, −67.8 °C (−90.0 °F), the largest ever temperature range recorded. The cold record is shared with Oymyakon.

== History ==
Cossacks founded an ostrog in 1638, 90 kilometers (56 mi) southwest of the modern town. The ostrog's name "Verkhoyansky", roughly translating from Russian as [thing/ostrog] on the Upper Yana (grammatically, it's only a masculine adjective), derived from its geographical location on the upper reaches of the Yana River. In 1775, it was moved to the left bank of the Yana River to facilitate tax collection. It was granted town status in 1817. Between the 1860s and 1917, the town was a place of political exile, with some of the more prominent exiles including the Polish writer Wacław Sieroszewski, as well as Bolshevik revolutionaries Ivan Babushkin and Viktor Nogin.

== Administrative and municipal status ==
As an inhabited locality, Verkhoyansk is classified as a town under district level jurisdiction. Within the framework of administrative divisions, it is incorporated within Verkhoyansky District as the Town of Verkhoyansk. As a municipal division, the Town of Verkhoyansk is incorporated within Verkhoyansky Municipal District as Verkhoyansk Urban Settlement.

== Economy and infrastructure ==
There is a river port, an airport, a fur-collecting depot, and the center of a reindeer-raising area.

== Geography ==
Verkhoyansk gives its name to the Verkhoyansk Range, one of the main mountainous zones of the Eastern Siberian System. The town is located close to the northwestern edge of the Yana-Oymyakon Highlands, a cold and sparsely populated area.

== Climate ==
With an extreme subarctic climate (Köppen climate classification Dsd, Trewartha climate classification Ecle), Verkhoyansk has extremely cold winter temperatures and some of the greatest temperature differences on Earth between summer and winter. Average monthly temperatures range from −44.7 °C (−48.5 °F) in January to +16.5 °C (61.7 °F) in July. Mean monthly temperatures are below freezing from October through April and exceed +10 °C (50 °F) from June through August, with the intervening months of May and September constituting very short transitional seasons. Located within the Arctic Circle, Verkhoyansk has an extreme subarctic climate rather than a tundra climate, dominated much of the year by high pressure. This has the effect of cutting off the region from warming influences in winter and together with a lack of cloud cover leads to extensive heat losses during the cooler months.

Verkhoyansk is one of the places considered the northern Pole of Cold, the other being Oymyakon, located 629 km (391 miles) away. The lowest recorded temperature was −67.8 °C (−90.0 °F), recorded on January 15, 1885, and both February 5 and 7, 1892. On 6 February 1933 however, the temperature at Oymyakon reached −67.7 °C (−89.9 °F), just barely below Verkhoyansk's record. Only Greenland and Antarctica have recorded lower temperatures than Oymyakon or Verkhoyansk: the lowest directly recorded temperature at ground level is −89.2 °C (−128.6 °F), recorded at the Vostok Station in Antarctica on 21 July 1983, and a temperature of −93.2 °C (−135.8 °F) was recorded via satellite observations at the East Antarctic Plateau in Antarctica on 10 August 2010. The World Meteorological Organization has recently recognized a temperature of −69.6 °C (−93.3 °F) measured in Greenland on 22 December 1991 as the lowest in the Northern Hemisphere. The record was measured at an automatic weather station and was uncovered after nearly 30 years.

In this area, temperature inversions consistently form in winter due to the extremely cold and dense air of the Siberian High pooling in deep hollows, so that temperatures increase rather than decrease with higher altitude. In Verkhoyansk it sometimes happens that the average minimum temperatures for January, February, and December are below −50 °C (−58 °F).

In its short summer, daytime temperatures over +30 °C (86 °F) are not uncommon. The average annual temperature for Verkhoyansk is −13.7 °C (7.3 °F). On 20 June 2020 Verkhoyansk recorded a temperature of +38.0 °C (100.4 °F), yielding a temperature range of 105.8 °C (190.4 °F) based on reliable records, making it the largest temperature range in the world. It was also the highest temperature above the Arctic Circle ever recorded. Only a handful of towns in Siberia and Canada have temperature ranges of 100 °C (180 °F) or more, and Verkhoyansk is the only place on earth with a temperature range of 105 °C (189 °F) or higher. Verkhoyansk has never recorded a temperature above freezing between November 10 and March 14.

Verkhoyansk has an extreme latitude temperature anomaly when compared with Røst off the coastline of Norway. Both settlements are on 67°N and almost on the same latitudal decimal. In spite of this, Røst is on average more than 45 °C (81 °F) milder during winter. In summer and particularly during July, on the other hand, Verkhoyansk is significantly warmer than its Norwegian counterpart.

Verkhoyansk has a dry climate with little rainfall or snowfall; the average annual precipitation is 182 millimeters (7.2 in). Although no month can be described as truly wet, there are strong seasonal differences in precipitation, with the summer being much wetter than the winter; because the driest month (April) is in the "summer" and has less than one-third the precipitation of the wettest "winter" month (October), Verkhoyansk's climate technically qualifies as Köppen Dsd, a classification found only in parts of eastern Siberia. The dryness experienced in winter is largely due to the dominance of high pressure at this time of year.

Finally, Verkhoyansk has very low seasonal lag, with December being colder than February, and June warmer than August. This is similar to Patagonia in the Southern Hemisphere, where June is the coldest month in many areas.

Climate data for Verkhoyansk (1991–2020, extremes 1869–present)
Month	Jan	Feb	Mar	Apr	May	Jun	Jul	Aug	Sep	Oct	Nov	Dec	Year
Record high °C (°F)	−9.5 (14.9)	−0.3 (31.5)	5.6 (42.1)	14.3 (57.7)	28.1 (82.6)	38.0 (100.4)	37.3 (99.1)	33.7 (92.7)	25.1 (77.2)	14.5 (58.1)	1.1 (34.0)	−5.3 (22.5)	38.0 (100.4)
Mean maximum °C (°F)	−26.6 (−15.9)	−22.7 (−8.9)	−4.5 (23.9)	7.3 (45.1)	21.2 (70.2)	29.7 (85.5)	31.5 (88.7)	28.2 (82.8)	17.8 (64.0)	4.3 (39.7)	−13.6 (7.5)	−23.8 (−10.8)	4.1 (39.4)
Mean daily maximum °C (°F)	−41.6 (−42.9)	−36.7 (−34.1)	−18.8 (−1.8)	−1.8 (28.8)	10.3 (50.5)	20.6 (69.1)	23.4 (74.1)	19.2 (66.6)	8.7 (47.7)	−8.5 (16.7)	−30.0 (−22.0)	−40.6 (−41.1)	−8.0 (17.6)
Daily mean °C (°F)	−44.7 (−48.5)	−42.1 (−43.8)	−28.9 (−20.0)	−10.9 (12.4)	4.2 (39.6)	13.9 (57.0)	16.5 (61.7)	12.1 (53.8)	2.8 (37.0)	−13.4 (7.9)	−33.7 (−28.7)	−43.6 (−46.5)	−13.7 (7.3)
Mean daily minimum °C (°F)	−47.7 (−53.9)	−46.3 (−51.3)	−37.4 (−35.3)	−20.4 (−4.7)	−2.0 (28.4)	7.3 (45.1)	10.0 (50.0)	5.7 (42.3)	−1.9 (28.6)	−18.0 (−0.4)	−37.3 (−35.1)	−46.3 (−51.3)	−19.5 (−3.1)
Mean minimum °C (°F)	−55.2 (−67.4)	−54.0 (−65.2)	−49.2 (−56.6)	−35.8 (−32.4)	−13.2 (8.2)	−0.4 (31.3)	1.9 (35.4)	−2.4 (27.7)	−10.9 (12.4)	−35.3 (−31.5)	−47.6 (−53.7)	−53.1 (−63.6)	−56.4 (−69.5)
Record low °C (°F)	−67.8 (−90.0)	−67.8 (−90.0)	−60.3 (−76.5)	−57.2 (−71.0)	−34.2 (−29.6)	−7.9 (17.8)	−3.2 (26.2)	−9.9 (14.2)	−21.7 (−7.1)	−48.7 (−55.7)	−57.2 (−71.0)	−64.5 (−84.1)	−67.8 (−90.0)
Average precipitation mm (inches)	6 (0.2)	5 (0.2)	5 (0.2)	4 (0.2)	16 (0.6)	30 (1.2)	34 (1.3)	30 (1.2)	22 (0.9)	13 (0.5)	11 (0.4)	6 (0.2)	182 (7.2)
Average extreme snow depth cm (inches)	20 (7.9)	22 (8.7)	24 (9.4)	18 (7.1)	1 (0.4)	0 (0)	0 (0)	0 (0)	0 (0)	5 (2.0)	12 (4.7)	16 (6.3)	24 (9.4)
Average rainy days	0	0	0	1	8	14	14	14	10	0.4	0	0	61
Average snowy days	17	16	12	9	8	1	0.3	0.4	8	17	18	16	123
Average relative humidity (%)	74	74	69	63	58	57	61	69	74	78	77	75	69
Mean monthly sunshine hours	2.0	83.1	244.1	285.2	305.8	339.6	316.3	231.5	129.6	98.0	23.8	0.0	2,099
Source 1: Погода и Климат January record
Source 2: NOAA, Infoclimat
