= Ust-Nera =

Ust-Nera Усть-Нера
- Urban-type settlement

Other transcription(s)
  - Yakut: Уус Ньара
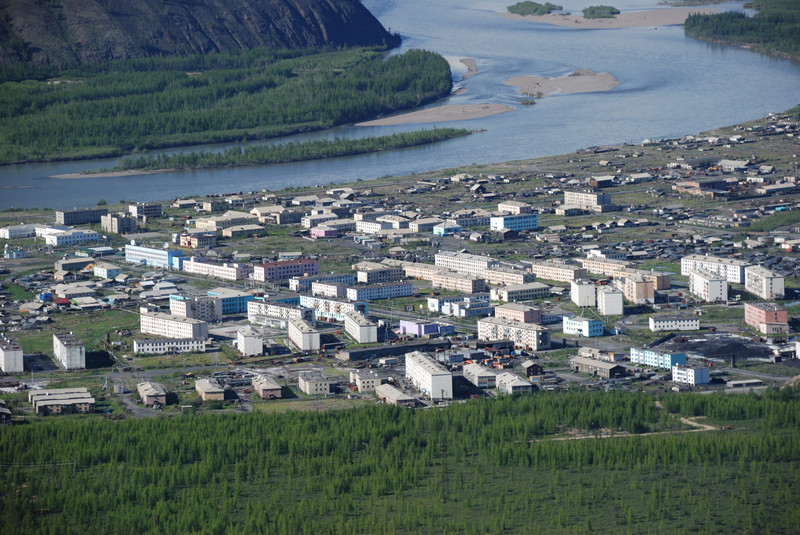
- View of Ust-Nera
- Interactive map of Ust-Nera
- Location of Ust-Nera Ust-Nera (Sakha Republic)
- Coordinates: 64°35′N 143°15′E
- Country: Russia
- Federal subject: Sakha Republic
- Administrative district: Oymyakonsky District
- SettlementSelsoviet: Settlement of Ust-Nera
- Founded: 1937
- Urban-type settlement status since: 1950

Population (2010 Census)
  - Total: 6,463
  - Estimate (2023): 4,160 (−35.6%)

Administrative status
  - Capital of: Oymyakonsky District, Settlement of Ust-Nera

Municipal status
  - Municipal district: Oymyakonsky Municipal District
  - Urban settlement: Ust-Nera Urban Settlement
  - Capital of: Oymyakonsky Municipal District, Ust-Nera Urban Settlement
- Time zone: UTC+
- Postal codes: 678730, 678739
- Dialing code: +7 41154
- OKTMO ID: 98639151051

Ust-Nera (Russian: Усть-Нера; Yakut: Уус Ньара, romanized: Uus Ņara) is an urban locality (an urban-type settlement) and the administrative center of Oymyakonsky District in Yakutia, Russia. Located in one of the coldest permanently inhabited regions on Earth, Ust-Nera is approximately 870 kilometers (540 mi) northeast of the republic's capital, Yakutsk. As of the 2010 Census, its population was 6,463.

Historical population
Year	Pop.	±%
1959	10,789	—
1970	7,820	−27.5%
1979	10,399	+33.0%
1989	12,535	+20.5%
2002	9,457	−24.6%
2010	6,463	−31.7%
2021	4,228	−34.6%
Source: Census data

From 1949 to 1957 a branch of the Indigir camp was located near Ust-Nera. In 2001 a monument was erected in memory of its prisoners.

== Geography ==
Ust-Nera is located at the confluence of the Nera and Indigirka Rivers, from which it takes its name (the ust- part means river mouth in Russian). Ust-Nera is located about 200 kilometers (120 mi) north of the selo of Oymyakon, which is one of two places in the Sakha Republic (the other being Verkhoyansk) that lays claim to being the northern Pole of Cold, the coldest location in the northern hemisphere.

The Tas-Kystabyt, Silyap Range and the Nera Plateau are located in the district.

== Climate ==
Ust-Nera has an extremely cold subarctic climate (Köppen climate classification Dwd) with short, mild, wet summers with chilly nights, and severely cold, dry winters.

Climate data for Ust-Nera
Month	Jan	Feb	Mar	Apr	May	Jun	Jul	Aug	Sep	Oct	Nov	Dec	Year
Mean daily maximum °C (°F)	−40.1 (−40.2)	−35.1 (−31.2)	−21.4 (−6.5)	−5.4 (22.3)	7.3 (45.1)	18.7 (65.7)	21.0 (69.8)	18.0 (64.4)	8.8 (47.8)	−9.2 (15.4)	−30.2 (−22.4)	−39.4 (−38.9)	−8.9 (15.9)
Daily mean °C (°F)	−44.0 (−47.2)	−40.7 (−41.3)	−30.4 (−22.7)	−14.9 (5.2)	0.7 (33.3)	11.1 (52.0)	13.3 (55.9)	10.2 (50.4)	2.5 (36.5)	−14.7 (5.5)	−34.5 (−30.1)	−43.0 (−45.4)	−15.4 (4.3)
Mean daily minimum °C (°F)	−47.9 (−54.2)	−46.2 (−51.2)	−39.3 (−38.7)	−24.3 (−11.7)	−5.8 (21.6)	3.5 (38.3)	5.7 (42.3)	2.4 (36.3)	−3.7 (25.3)	−20.1 (−4.2)	−38.8 (−37.8)	−46.5 (−51.7)	−21.7 (−7.1)
Average precipitation mm (inches)	8 (0.3)	7 (0.3)	4 (0.2)	7 (0.3)	17 (0.7)	37 (1.5)	55 (2.2)	45 (1.8)	24 (0.9)	14 (0.6)	11 (0.4)	8 (0.3)	237 (9.5)
Source: http://en.climate-data.org/location/28842/

== History ==
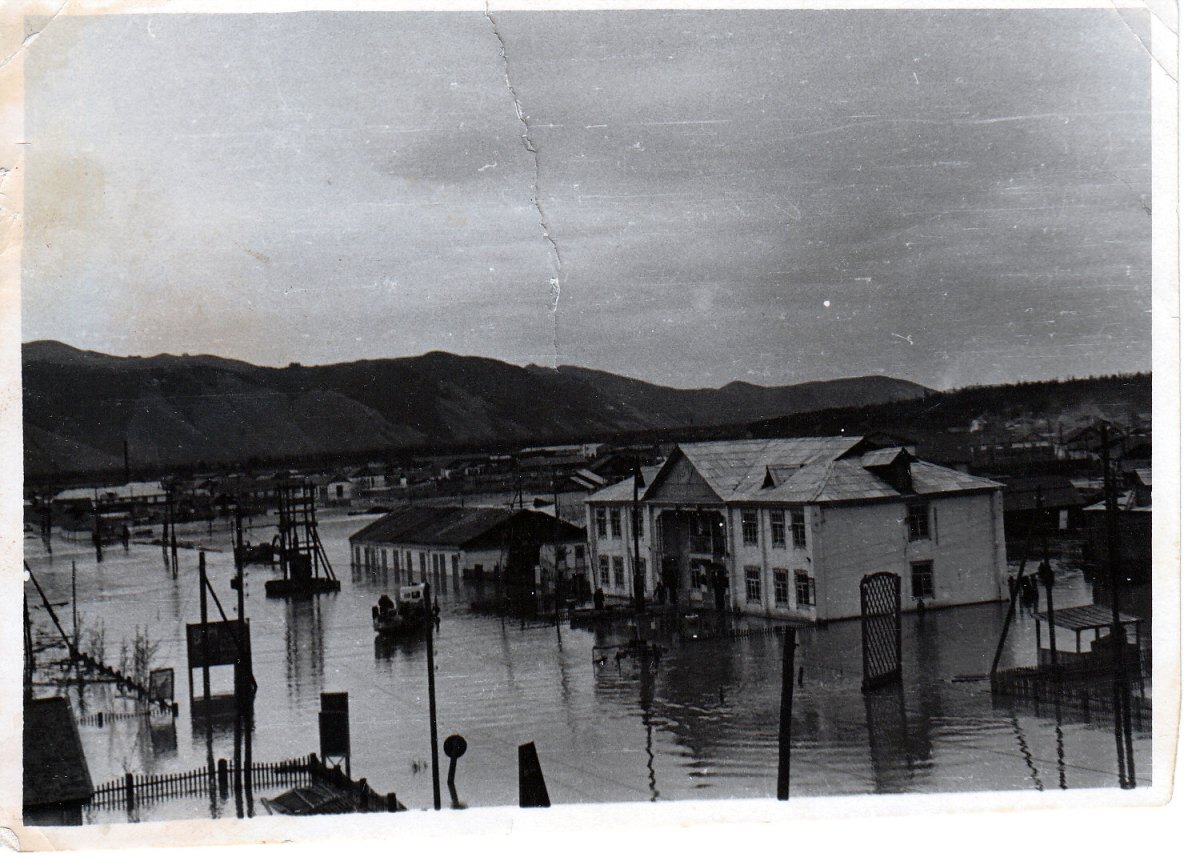
Ust-Nera flood of 1959

Ust-Nera was founded in 1937 in conjunction with gold mining and exploration in the Indigirka and Kolyma regions. In the Soviet era, it served as a base for forced labor camps of the gulag. Urban-type settlement status was granted to Ust-Nera in 1950.

== Administrative and municipal status ==
Within the framework of administrative divisions, the urban-type settlement of Ust-Nera serves as the administrative center of Oymyakonsky District. As an administrative division, it is incorporated within Oymyakonsky District as the Settlement of Ust-Nera. As a municipal division, the Settlement of Ust-Nera is incorporated within Oymyakonsky Municipal District as Ust-Nera Urban Settlement.

== Economy ==
Gold mining is the main occupation. The Kolyma Highway was extended northwest to Ust-Nera in 1937; this section is now the main route between Yakutsk and Magadan. The Ust-Nera Airport is serving air traffic. River traffic on the Indigirka is limited by the rapids 100 kilometers (62 mi) downstream.

== Culture ==
There is a small museum in Ust-Nera.
