= Ust-Charky =

Ust-Charky Усть-Чаркы Уус Чаркы (Sakha)
- Selo
- Interactive map of Ust-Charky
- Location of Ust-Charky Ust-Charky (Sakha Republic)
- Coordinates: 66°47′17″N 136°40′00″E
- Country: Russia
- Federal subject: Sakha Republic
- Administrative district: Verkhoyansky District
- Rural okrugSelsoviet: Batagay Urban Settlement

Population (2010 Census)
  - Total: 2
  - Estimate (2021): 0 (−100%)

Municipal status
  - Municipal district: Verkhoyansky Municipal District
  - Rural settlement: Batagay Urban Settlement
- Time zone: UTC+
- Postal code: 676767
- OKTMO ID: 98616151111

Ust-Charky (Russian: Усть-Чаркы; Yakut: Уус Чаркы, romanized: Uus Çarkı) is a rural locality (a selo), one of three settlements in addition to Batagay, the administrative centre, and Sentachan in Batagay Urban Settlement of Verkhoyansky District in the Sakha Republic, Russia, located 239 kilometers (149 mi) from Batagay, the administrative center of the district and the Urban Settlement centre. Its population as of the 2010 Census was 2, down from 7 recorded during the 2002 Census. Today it is completely abandoned as of the 2021 census.

== Geography ==
Ust-Charky is located by the Adycha River, a little downstream from its confluence with the Charky.

== Ust-Charky weather station and History. ==
Ust-Charky weather station was established in 1942. It has one large house and multiple smaller buildings which all sit along a steep river bank. The station was made to support the ALSIB which helped to bring in lend-lease from the US.

During the Soviet era, Ust-Charky served as a base for road maintenance crews who operated the seasonal winter ice roads (zimnik) which helped to connect Yakutsk and Batagay. After loss of state subsidies and rerouting of winter roads the civilian settlement was abandoned although the weather station is still in operation with a small group of rotating staff.
