= Nelgesin Range =

Mountain range in Russia

- Нельгесинский хребет / Нэльгэһэ
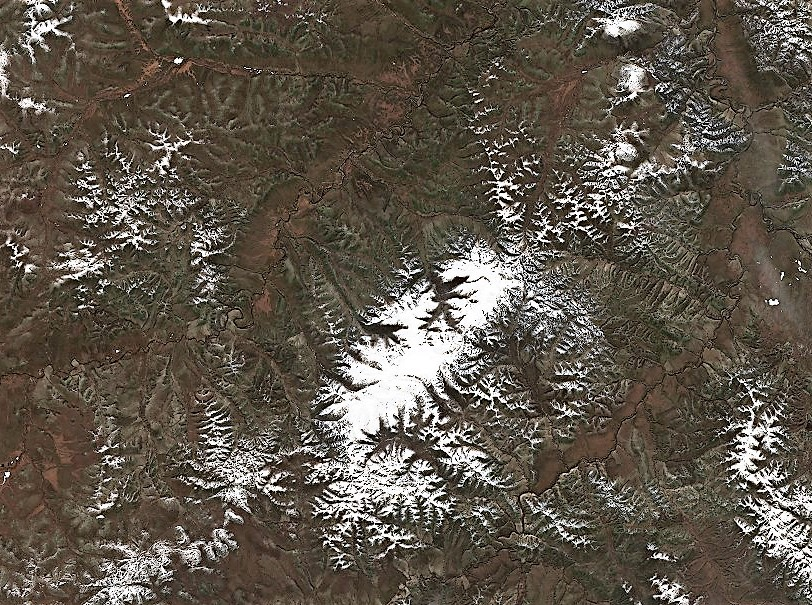
- Nelgesin Range Sentinel-2 image

Highest point
- Peak: Unnamed
- Elevation: 1,926 m (6,319 ft)
- Coordinates: 65°59′21″N 135°51′58″E

Dimensions
- Length: 140 km (87 mi) NE/SW
- Width: 40 km (25 mi) NW/SE

Geography
- Location within Sakha Republic
- Country: Russia
- Federal subject: Sakha Republic
- Range coordinates: 66°03′N 136°04′E
- Parent range: Yana-Oymyakon Highlands; Chersky Range, East Siberian System

Climbing
- Easiest route: From Batagay

The Nelgesin Range (Russian: Нельгесинский хребет) is a mountain range in the Sakha Republic (Yakutia), Far Eastern Federal District, Russia. The nearest city is Batagay to the north of the range.

The nearest airport is Batagay Airport.

== Geography ==
The Nelgesin Range rises in the area of the Yana-Oymyakon Highlands, part of the Chersky Mountains, to the west of the Adycha and north of the Derbeke. It stretches in a roughly southwest–northeast direction for about 140 kilometers (87 mi), with the Adycha at its northern end. The highest peak is a 1,926 metres (6,319 ft) high unnamed summit.

The smaller Tirekhtyakh Range, another subrange of the Chersky Mountains, rises to the north, stretching parallel to the general direction of the Nelgesin Range.

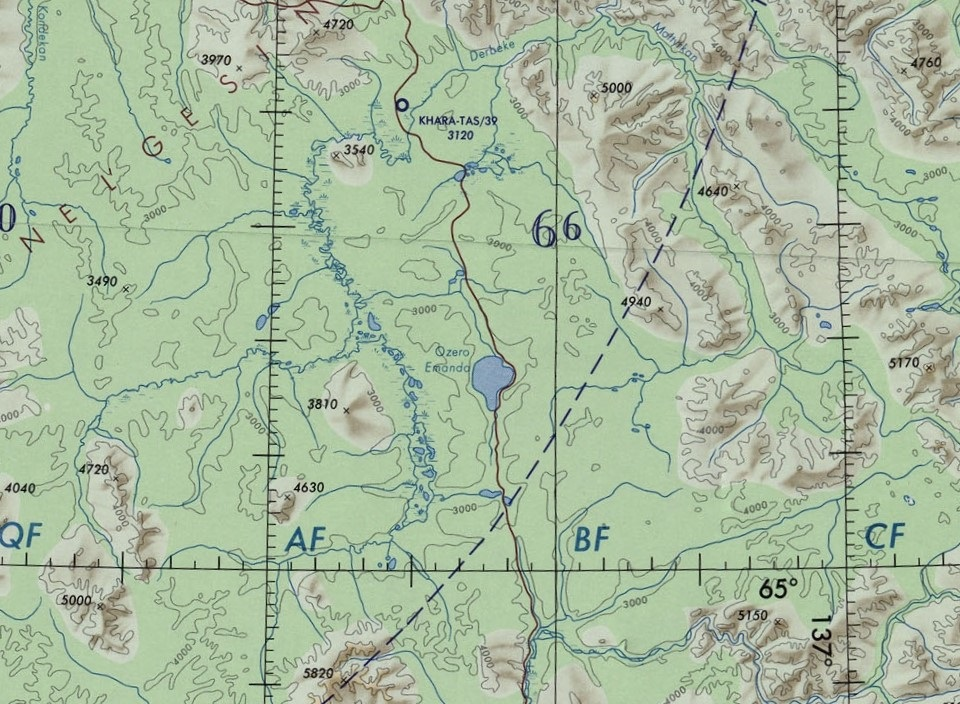
The southern end of the Nelgesin Range to the north of lake Emanda.

== See also ==
- Derbeke-Nelgesinsky mine
- List of mountains and hills of Russia
