= Tirekhtyakh Range =

Mountain range in Russia

- Тирехтяхский хребет / Тирэхтээх
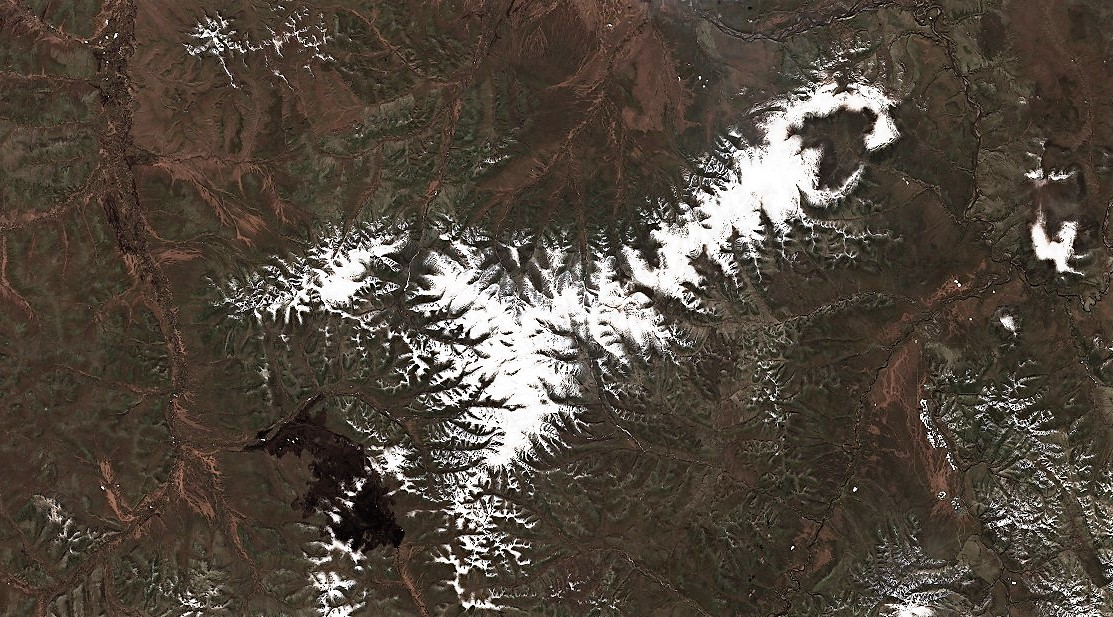
- Tirekhtyakh Range Sentinel-2 image

Highest point
- Peak: Unnamed
- Elevation: 1,816 m (5,958 ft)
- Coordinates: 66°41′08″N 135°23′22″E

Dimensions
- Length: 130 km (81 mi) NE/SW
- Width: 30 km (19 mi) NW/SE

Geography
- Location within Sakha Republic
- Country: Russia
- Federal subject: Sakha Republic
- Range coordinates: 66°40′N 136°30′E
- Parent range: Yana-Oymyakon Highlands; Chersky Range, East Siberian System

Climbing
- Easiest route: From Batagay

The Tirekhtyakh Range (Russian: Тирехтяхский хребет; Yakut: Тирэхтээх) is a mountain range in the Sakha Republic (Yakutia), Far Eastern Federal District, Russia. The nearest city is Batagay to the north of the range.

The closest airport is Batagay Airport.

== Geography ==
The Tirekhtyakh Range rises in the area of the Yana-Oymyakon Highlands, part of the Chersky Mountains, to the west of the Adycha, south of the Borulakh and north of the Nelgese. It stretches in a roughly southwest–northeast direction for about 130 kilometers (81 mi), with the Adycha bending westwards at its northern end. The highest peak is a 1,816 metres (5,958 ft) high unnamed summit.

The slightly larger and higher Nelgesin Range, another subrange of the Chersky Mountains, rises to the south, stretching roughly parallel to the general direction of the Tirekhtyakh Range.

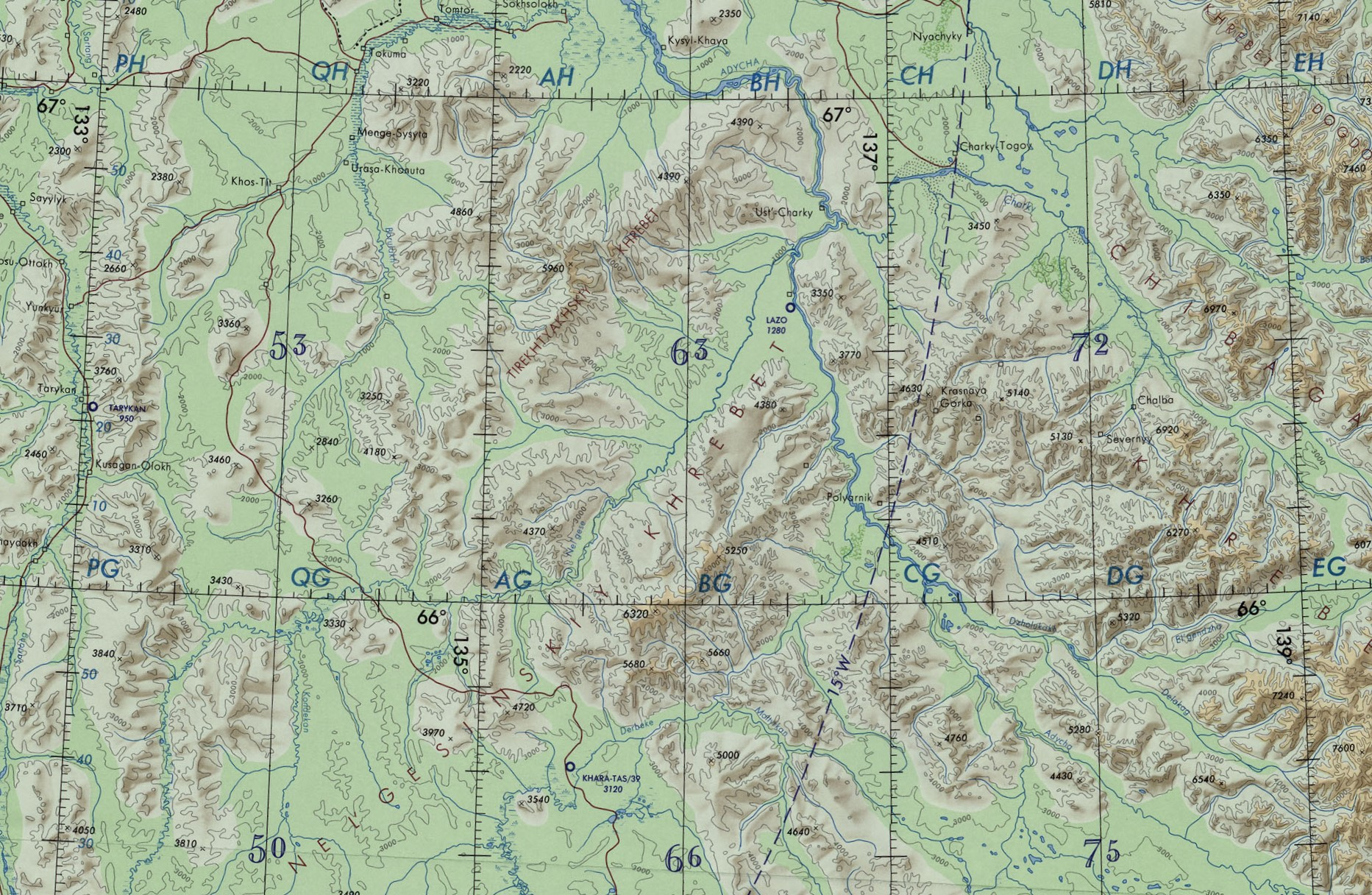
ONC section of the Tirekhtyakh and Nelgesin range area.

== See also ==
- List of mountains and hills of Russia
