= Tuostakh =

Тuostаkh
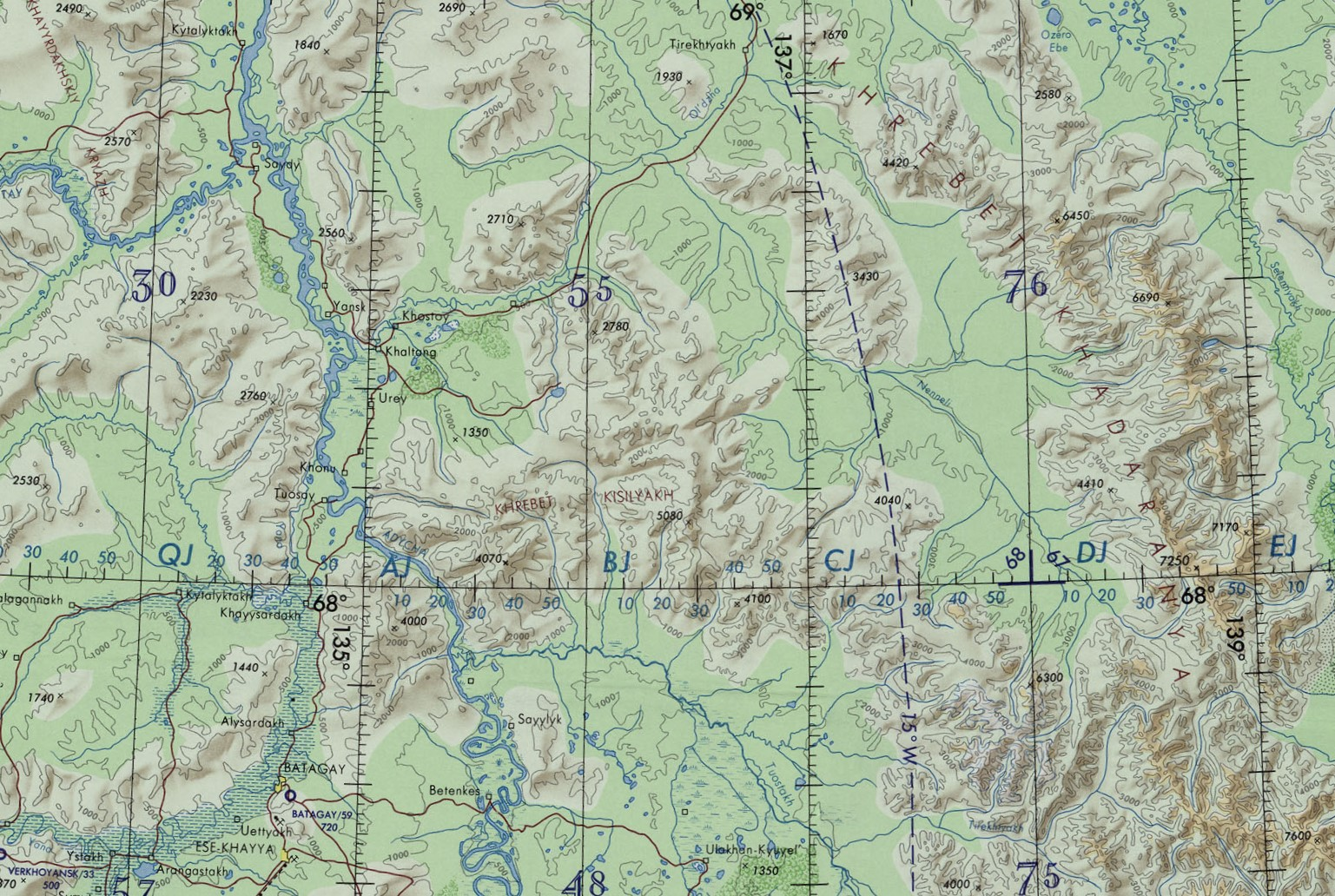
- Map section showing part of the course of the Tuostakh in the lower center

- Mouth location in Yakutia, Russia
- Native name: Yakut: Туостаах

Location
- Federal subject: Yakutia, Russia

Physical characteristics
- Source
  - location: Confluence of rivers Khara-Sala and Boldymba
  - coordinates: 66°40′22″N 138°44′28″E
  - elevation: 488 m (1,601 ft)
- Mouth: Adycha
  - coordinates: 67°51′36″N 135°25′33″E
  - elevation: 133 m (436 ft)
- Length: 271 km (168 mi)
- Basin size: 20,000 km^{2} (7,700 sq mi)
- Discharge
  - average: 110 m^{3}/s (3,900 cu ft/s)

Basin features
- Progression: Adycha→ Yana→ Laptev Sea

The Tuostakh (Russian: Туостах; Yakut: Туостаах, Tuostaax) is a river in the Verkhoyansk District, Sakha (Yakutia), Russia. It is a left hand tributary of the Adycha, of the Yana basin. The river is 271 kilometres (168 mi) long, having a drainage basin of 20,000 square kilometres (7,700 mi^{2}).

Grayling, lenok and taimen are found in the waters of the river. The name of the river originated in the Yakut word "tuos", meaning "birch" The nearest city is Batagay, and the nearest airfield Batagay Airport.

== Course ==
The Tuostakh begins in the middle section of the Chersky Range at the confluence of rivers Khara-Sala and Boldymba in the western slopes of the Dogdo Range, between the Polar circle and the northern end of the Chibagalakh Range. It heads roughly northwest meandering slowly across a very swampy area dotted with small lakes where it divides into channels. After turning west in a wide arch at the feet of the southern side of the Kisilyakh Range the river joins the right bank of the Adycha downstream from the Charky.

The main tributaries of the Tuostakh are the Dogdo and the Tirekhtyakh, both from the right. The river freezes in October and stays under thick ice until the end of May or early June. There are about 40 ice fields in the Tuostakh basin, with a total surface area of 40 km^{2} (15 sq mi).

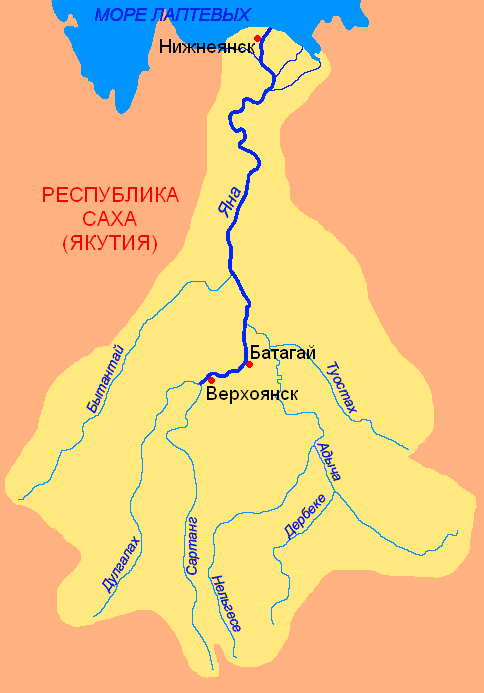
Basin of the Yana. The Tuostakh in the lower right.

== See also ==
- List of rivers of Russia
