= Chersky Range =

Mountain range in northeastern Siberia, Russia

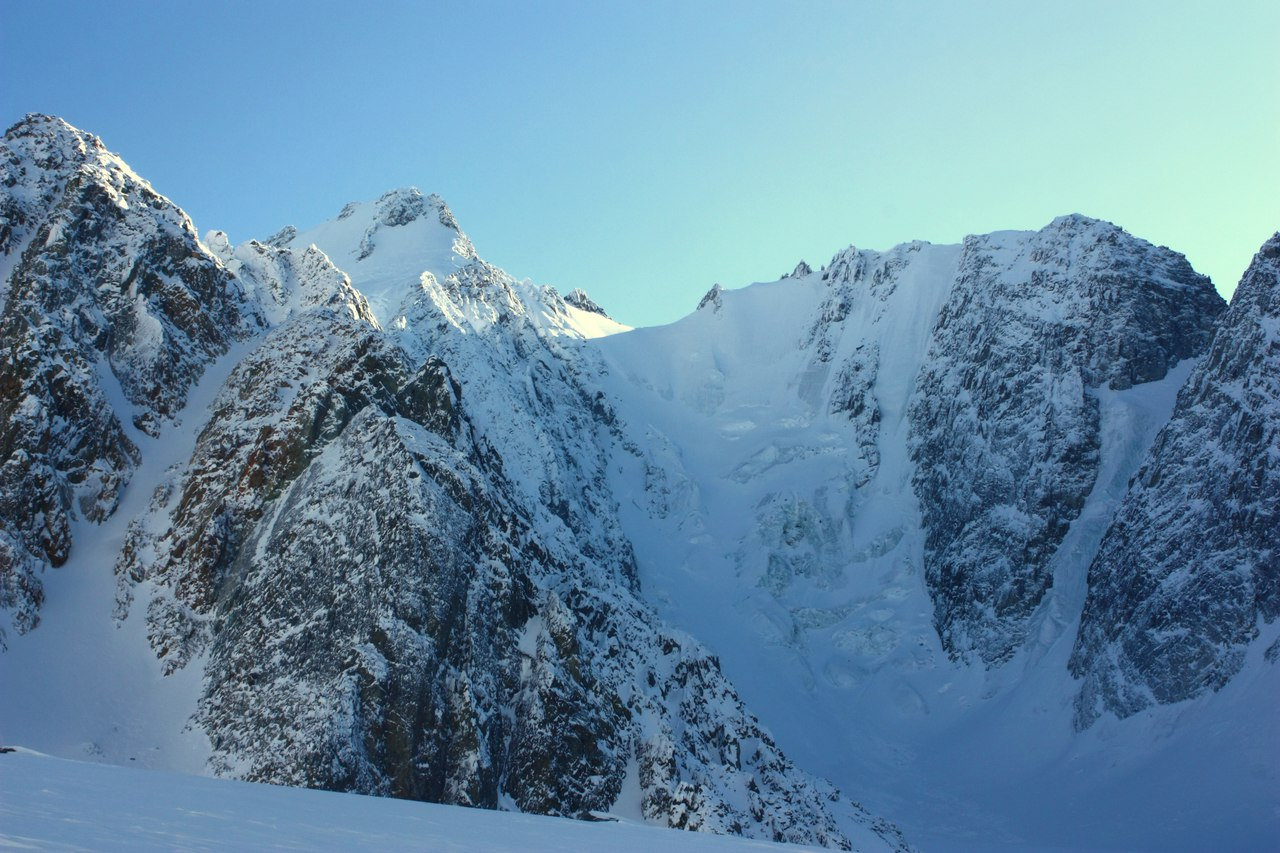
- View of Pobeda (Victory) Peak, highest point of the range.

Highest point
- Peak: Pobeda
- Elevation: 3,003 metres (9,852 ft)
- Coordinates: 64°44′N 142°58′E

Dimensions
- Length: 1,500 km (930 mi) NW/SE
- Width: 400 km (250 mi) NE/SW

Geography
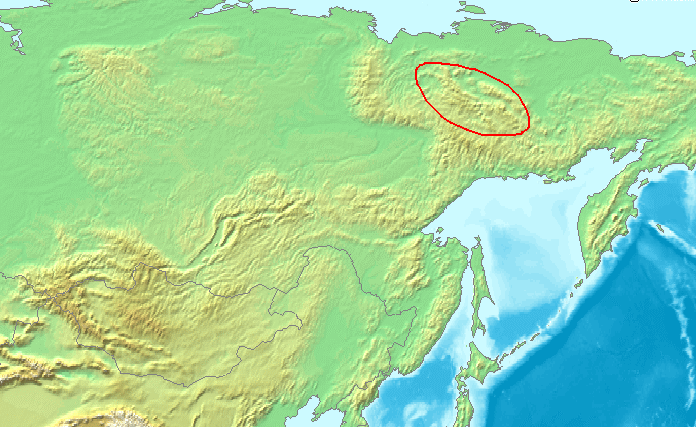
- Country: Russia
- Republic / Oblast: Sakha; Magadan
- Parent range: East Siberian System

Geology
- Rock ages: Precambrian; Permian; Triassic; Jurassic
- Rock types: Schist; sandstone; siltstone; Granite intrusive rocks

The Chersky Range (Russian: Хребет Черского, Yakut: Черскэй хайалара, romanized: Çerskey xayalara) is a chain of mountains in northeastern Siberia between the Yana and Indigirka Rivers. Administratively, the area of the range belongs to the Sakha Republic, although a small section in the east is within Magadan Oblast. The highest peak in the range is the 3,003-metre-tall (9,852 ft) Peak Pobeda, part of the Ulakhan-Chistay Range. The range also includes important places of traditional Yakut culture, such as Ynnakh Mountain (Mat'-Gora) and kigilyakh rock formations.

The Moma Natural Park is a protected area located in the southern zone of the range.

== History ==
At some time between 1633 and 1642, Poznik Ivanov ascended a tributary of the lower Lena, crossed the Verkhoyansk Range to the upper Yana, and then crossed the Chersky Range to the Indigirka. The range was sighted in 1926 by Sergei Obruchev (Vladimir Obruchev's son) and named by the Russian Geographical Society after the Polish explorer and geographer Ivan Chersky (or Jan Czerski).

== Geography ==
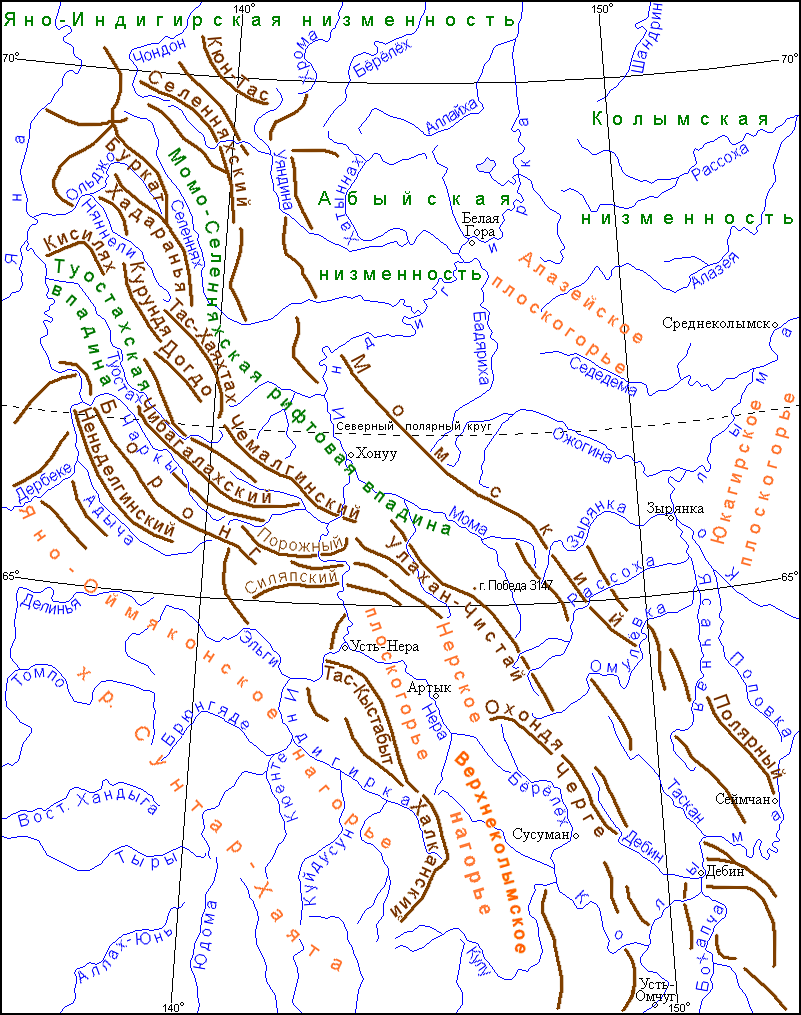
Schematic map of the Chersky System.

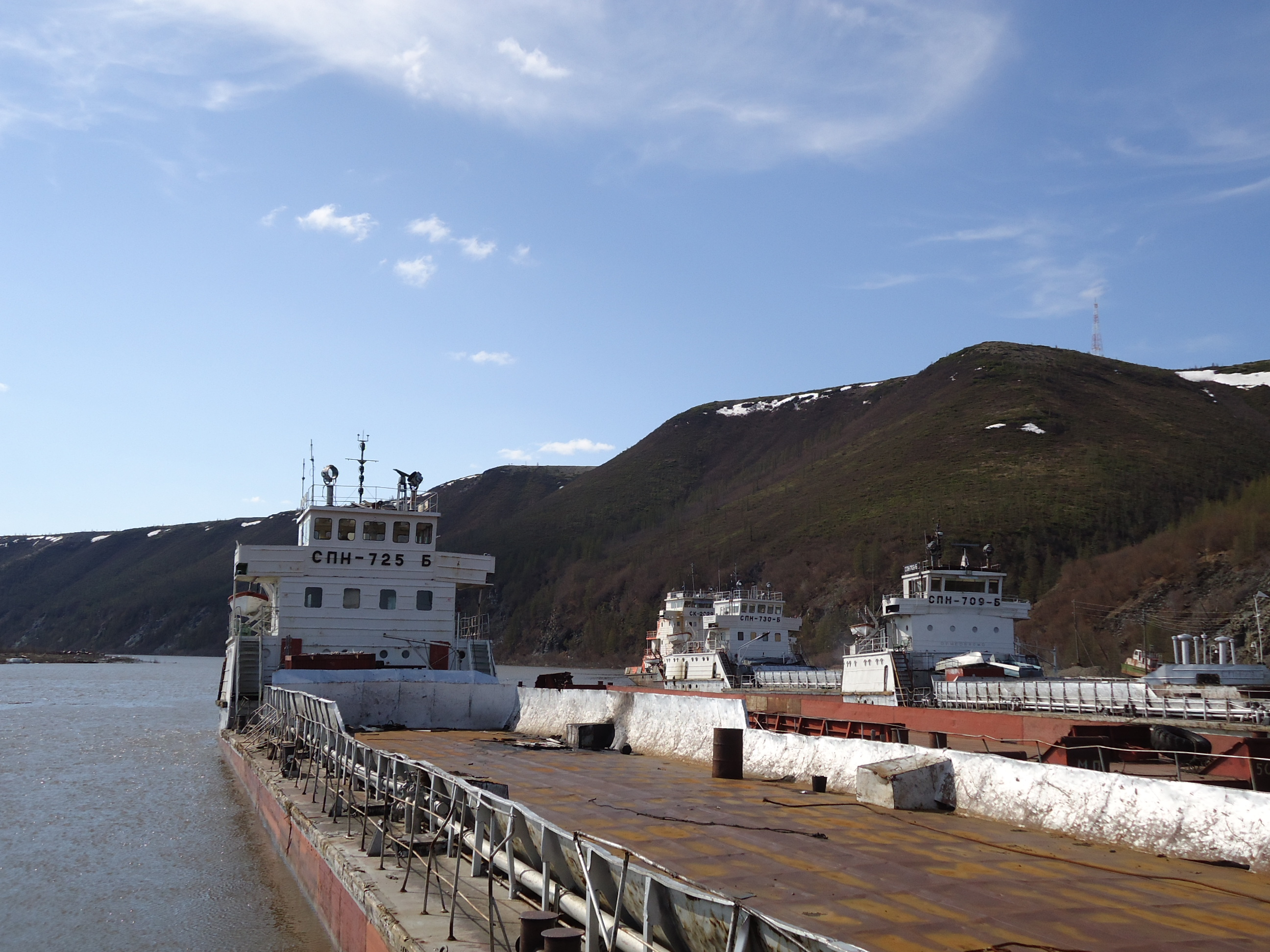
Kyundyulyun, the northernmost spur of the Chersky Range on the right bank of the Yana near Ust-Kuyga.

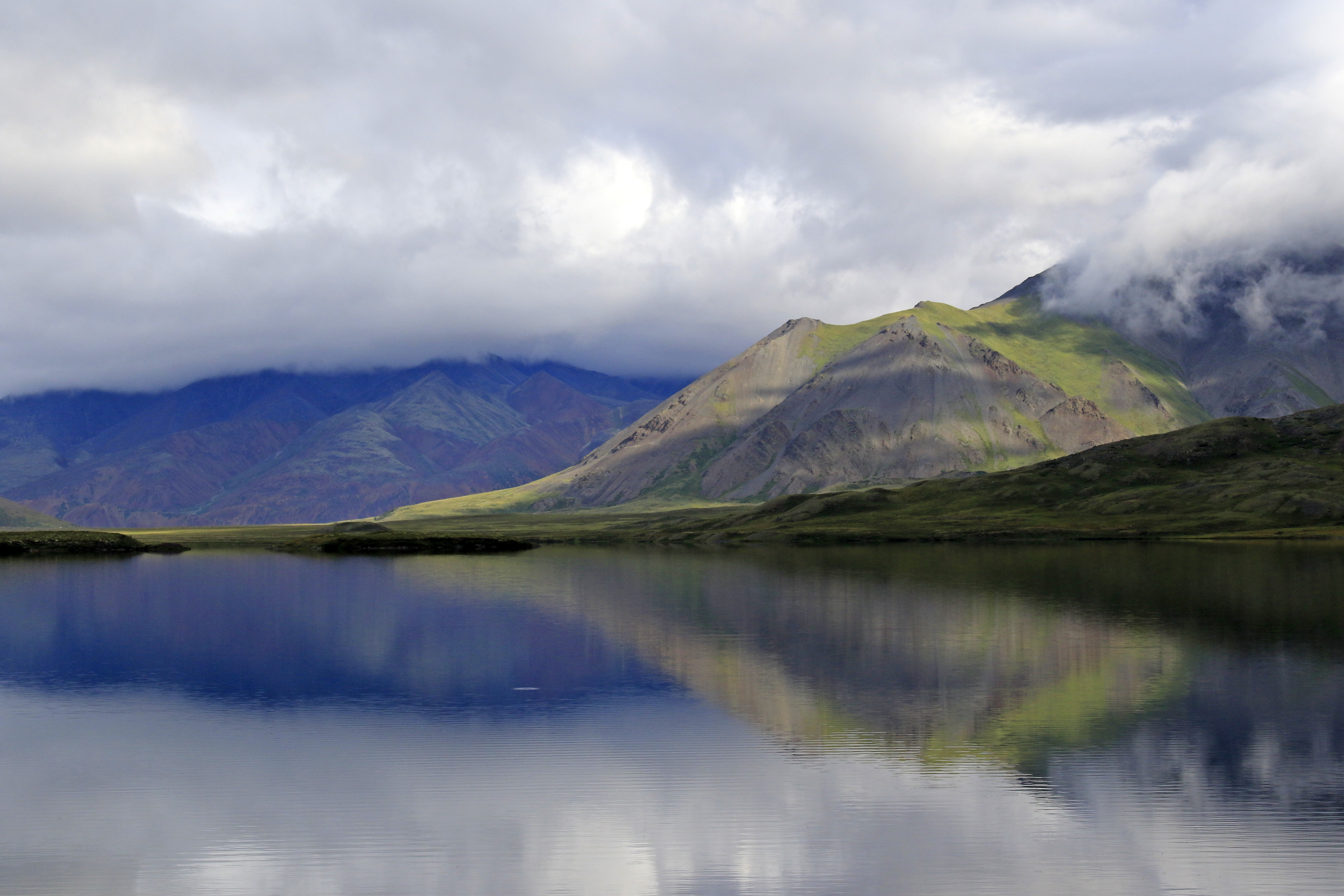
A lake in the Ulakhan-Chistay Range.

The geographic boundaries of the mountain system are the Yana–Oymyakon Highlands in the southwest, the Upper Kolyma Highlands in the southeast, and the Momo-Selennyakh Depression in the northeast.

=== Subranges ===
The system of the Chersky Range comprises a number of subranges running generally from northwest to southeast, including the following:

Between the Yana and Indigirka rivers:

- Burkat Range, highest point 1,150 metres (3,770 ft)
- Khadaranya Range, highest point 2,185 metres (7,169 ft)
- Ymiysky Range, highest point 1,048 metres (3,438 ft)
- Kisilyakh Range, highest point 1,548 metres (5,079 ft), by the confluence of the Adycha and the Yana
- Tas-Khayakhtakh, highest point 2,356 metres (7,730 ft)
- Kurundya Range, highest point 1,919 metres (6,296 ft)
- Dogdo Range, highest point 2,272 metres (7,454 ft)
- Chemalgin Range, highest point 2,547 metres (8,356 ft)
- Yana-Oymyakon Highlands
  - Elgi Plateau (Эльгинское плоскогорье), highest point 1,590 metres (5,220 ft)
  - Oymyakon Plateau, highest point 1,400 metres (4,600 ft)
  - Yana Plateau, highest point 1,770 metres (5,810 ft)
  - Tirekhtyakh Range and Nelgesin Range, between the Adycha and Sartang rivers

In the upper Kolyma river basin:

- Ulakhan-Chistay, highest point 3,003 metres (9,852 ft), near the southern end
- Okhandya Range, highest point 2,337 metres (7,667 ft), the highest point of Magadan Oblast.
- Cherge Range, highest point 2,332 metres (7,651 ft)
- Angachak Range, highest point 2,293 metres (7,523 ft)
- Arga-Tas, highest point 2,400 metres (7,900 ft)

Between the Chibagalakh and Adycha rivers

- Chibagalakh Range, highest point 2,449 metres (8,035 ft)
- Onyol Range (Онёлский хребет), highest point 2,328 metres (7,638 ft)
- Borong Range, highest point 2,681 metres (8,796 ft) (west of the Charky)
- Nendelgin Range, highest point 1,777 metres (5,830 ft) (east of the Adycha)
- Porozhny Range, highest point 2,551 metres (8,369 ft)
- Silyap Range, highest point Mount Chyon (Гора Чён) 2,690 metres (8,830 ft)

Between the Indigirka and the Nera rivers:

- Tas-Kystabyt, highest point 2,341 metres (7,680 ft)
- Khalkan Range, highest point 1,615 metres (5,299 ft), a southern prolongation of Tas-Kystabyt

Northeastern outliers

In some works, a few roughly-parallel ranges located off the main system to the northeast, such as the Kyun-Tas Range (highest point 1,242 metres (4,075 ft)), the Selennyakh Range (highest point highest point Saltag-Tas (2,021 metres (6,631 ft)), and the adjacent Moma Range (highest point 2,533 metres (8,310 ft)), with the Moma-Selennyakh Depression running along their western side, are included in the Chersky mountain system.

Other ranges of the system include the Irgichin Range, Inyalin Range, Volchan Range, Silen Range, and Polyarny Range, among others.

== Hydrography ==
The Chersky System includes three main river basins:

- Yana River, covering the western and northwestern parts of the mountain system. It includes rivers Oldzho and Adycha with its tributaries Tuostakh and Charky.
- Indigirka River, covering the northeastern, central, and southwestern parts of the system, with rivers Selennyakh, Moma, and Nera, among others.
- Kolyma River, covering the eastern, southeastern, and southern parts of the system, with rivers Zyryanka, Rassokha, Omulyovka, Yasachnaya, Taskan, Debin, and Byoryolyokh, among others.

Some of the higher ranges with alpine relief have glaciers. There are roughly 350 glaciers in the system, with a total area of 156.2 km^{2} (60.3 sq mi). There are also small lakes in the swampy valleys of some rivers, as well as lakes of glacial origin, such as Emanda and Tabanda.

== Tectonics ==
The range lies on the boundary between the Eurasian and North American tectonic plates.

The precise nature of the boundary between the North American and Eurasian tectonic plates in the area of the Chersky Range is still not fully understood and is the subject of ongoing research. By the 1980s, the Chersky Range was considered mostly a zone of continental rifting where the crust was spreading apart. However, the current view is that the Chersky Range is mostly an active suture zone, a continental convergent plate boundary, where compression is occurring as the two plates press against each other. There is thought to be a point in the Chersky Range where the extensional forces coming from the north change to the compressional forces noted throughout most of the range. The Chersky Range is also thought to include a geologic triple junction where the Ulakhan Fault intersects the suture zone. Whatever the exact nature of the regional tectonics, the Chersky Range is seismically active. It connects in the north with the landward extension of the Laptev Sea Rift, itself a continental extension of the Mid-Arctic Gakkel Ridge.

== Climate ==
The Chersky mountains, along with the neighboring Verkhoyansk Range, have a moderating effect on the climate of Siberia. The ridges obstruct west-moving air flows, decreasing the amount of snowfall in the plains to the west.

== See also ==
- Balagan-Tas
- Kigilyakh
- Nera Plateau
- Titovskaya Sopka
