= Yana Plateau =

Plateau in the country of Russia

- Дьааҥы хаптал хайалара Янское плоскогорье
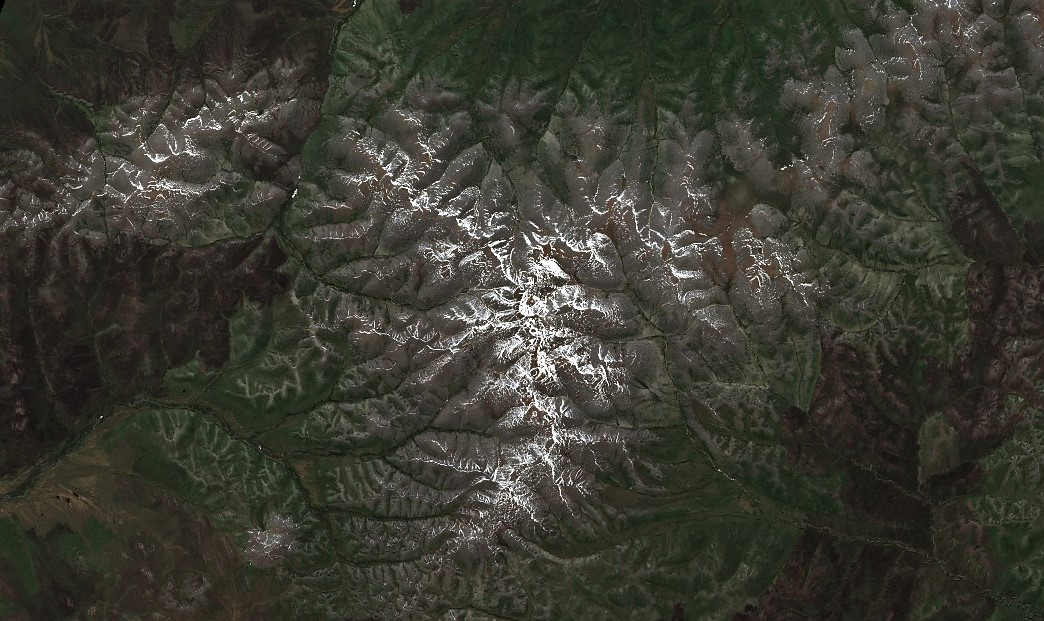
- Arga-Billyakh massif Sentinel-2 image

Highest point
- Peak: Arga-Billyakh
- Elevation: 1,770 m (5,810 ft)

Geography
- Location within Far Eastern Federal District
- Country: Russia
- Federal subject: Sakha Republic
- Range coordinates: 63°15′N 141°30′E
- Parent range: Yana—Oymyakon Highlands, East Siberian System

Geology
- Rock age: Triassic
- Rock types: Siltstone, shale, sandstone and Granite intrusions

The Yana Plateau (Russian: Янское плоскогорье, Yakut: Дьааҥы хаптал хайалара, romanized: Caañı xaptal xayalara) is a mountain plateau in the Sakha Republic, Far Eastern Federal District, Russia.

The plateau lies in an uninhabited area where solitude prevails. It was first surveyed and mapped in 1868 by Gerhard von Maydell (1835–1894), a Russian government officer in East Siberia of Estonian descent.

== Geography ==
The Yana Plateau is located in the middle basin of the Yana River. The Yana Plateau is limited by the Nendelgin Range, part of the Chersky Range to the northeast and by the Verkhoyansk Range to the southwest, connecting both mountain regions.

Together with the Elgi Plateau to the south, it is part of the Yana–Oymyakon Highlands with which it forms a tectonic continuum. However, there is no clear geomorphological boundary with the Elgi Plateau. The average elevations of the plateau surface are between 450 metres (1,480 ft) and 800 metres (2,600 ft). Individual mountain massifs with elevations up to 1,500 metres (4,900 ft) rise above the plateau; the highest point is the 1,770 metres (5,810 ft) highest summit of the Arga-Billyakh massif, located at 66°40′41″N 135°26′23″E between the Adycha and its tributary Borulakh.

=== Hydrography ===
Generally rivers flow across the Yana Plateau from the south to the north, including the Yana River with its tributary Adycha and its tributaries Derbeke, Nelgese and Tuostakh, as well as the Sartang, Dulgalakh and Bytantay, among others. The Tykakh has its sources in the NW part of the plateau. The middle courses of the Derbeke and the Nelgese, tributaries of the Adycha flowing northwards across the Yana Plateau, have swamps and numerous lakes, including Emanda (Yakut: Эмандьа), the largest lake in the area.

== Flora ==
There are mainly taiga-type sparse larch forests on the plateau.

== See also ==
- Oymyakon Plateau
