= Tykakh =

River in Yakutia, Russia

Tykakh Тыках / Тыкаах
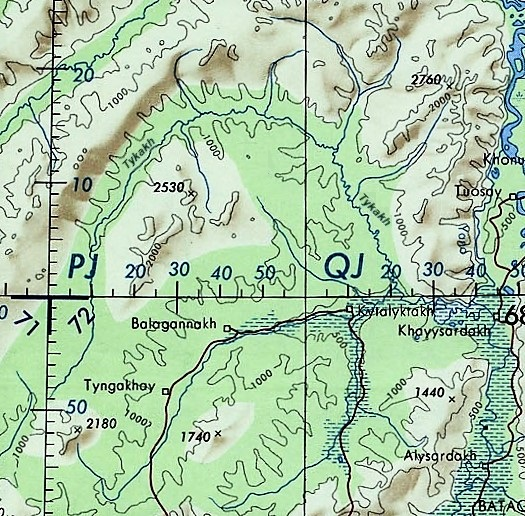
- Course of the Tykakh ONC map section

- Mouth location in Yakutia, Russia

Location
- Country: Russia

Physical characteristics
- Source
  - location: Yana Plateau
  - coordinates: 69°49′31″N 130°20′48″E
  - elevation: 324 metres (1,063 ft)
- Mouth: Yana
  - coordinates: 69°07′34″N 134°27′40″E
  - elevation: 115 metres (377 ft)
- Length: 241 km (150 mi) (272 km (169 mi) )
- Basin size: 5,010 km^{2} (1,930 sq mi)

Basin features
- Progression: Yana → Laptev Sea

The Tykakh (Russian: Тыках; Yakut: Тыкаах, Tıkaax) is a river in the Sakha Republic (Yakutia), Russia. It is a tributary of the Yana. The river has a length of 241 kilometres (150 mi) and a drainage basin area of 5,010 square kilometres (1,930 mi^{2}).

The river flows just north of the Arctic Circle and there are no settlements near its course. Its basin falls within Verkhoyansky District.

== Course ==
The Tykakh is a left tributary of the Yana. It has its sources at the confluence of the Arga-Sala and Ilin-Sala —both having a length of 31 km (19 mi)— at the edge of the northwestern part of the Yana Plateau, near the southeastern end of the Kular Range of the Verkhoyansk system. The river flows first northeastwards, bending in a wide arch roughly in mid-course and then heading southeastwards within the mountain area. Towards the end it meanders heading in an eastern direction in its last stretch, where the river enters a swampy area with lakes. Finally it meets the left bank of the Yana 660 km (410 mi) from its mouth. The nearest inhabited place is Batagay, located upstream from its confluence with the Yana

=== Tributaries ===
The main tributaries of the Tykakh are the 114 km (71 mi) long Oyuun-Yurege (Ойуун-Юрэгэ) on the right, as well as the 54 km (34 mi) long Tyiylyky (Тыйылыкы) on the left. There are 200 lakes in the river basin. The river is frozen between early October and late May or early June.

== See also ==
- List of rivers of Russia
