= Chibagalakh Range =

Mountain range in Yakutia, Russia

- Чибагала̀хский хребет / Чыбаҕалаах
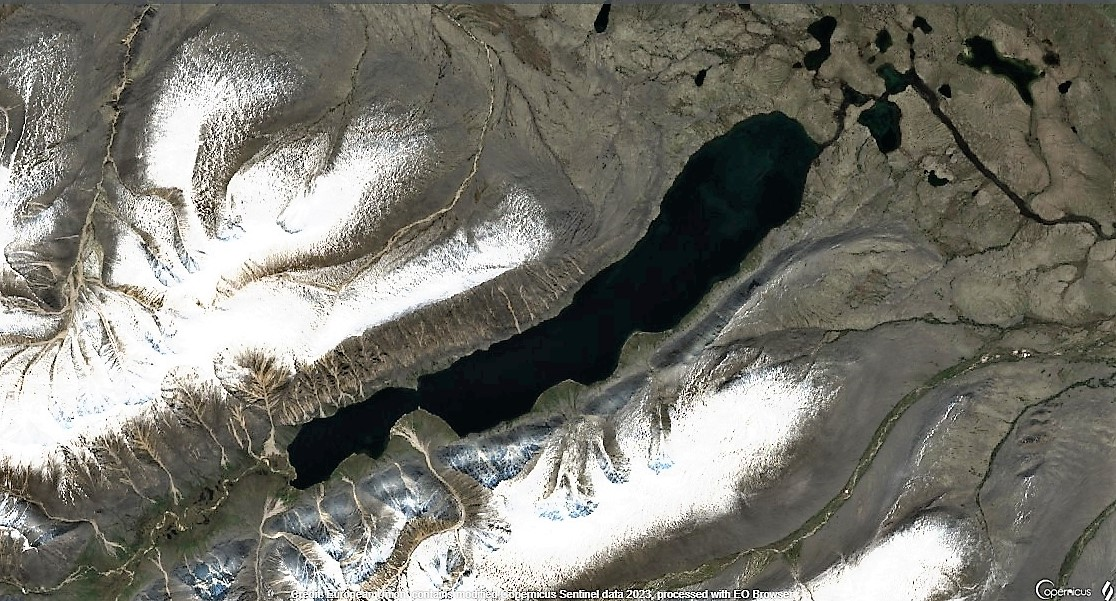
- Northern slopes of the range and lake Tabanda Sentinel-2 image.

Highest point
- Peak: Unnamed
- Elevation: 2,449 m (8,035 ft)

Dimensions
- Length: 250 km (160 mi) NW/SE
- Width: 40 km (25 mi) NE/SW

Geography
- Location within Sakha Republic
- Country: Russia
- Federal subject: Sakha Republic
- Range coordinates: 66°00′N 140°00′E
- Parent range: Chersky Range, East Siberian System

Geology
- Rock age: Early Cretaceous
- Rock type(s): Metamorphic rock, shale and sandstone

The Chibagalakh Range (Russian: Чибагала̀хский хребет; Yakut: Чыбаҕалаах, romanized: Çıbağalâx) is a mountain range in the Sakha Republic (Yakutia), Far Eastern Federal District, Russia.

Despite the beauty of its landscapes the range is rarely visited owing to its remoteness. In 1977 a group of tourists from Kharkov visited the area and climbed Salishchev Peak. The nearest airport is Ust-Nera Airport.

== Geology ==
With a length of over 200 kilometers (120 mi) the Chibagalakh Range is the largest batholith in the area of Northeastern Russia. It is in part peraluminous two-mica granite —a granite containing both muscovite and biotite micas), being the showpiece of the "collisional" granites.

== Geography ==
The Chibagalakh Range rises in the central area of the Chersky Range, between the valley of the Tuostakh —a tributary of the Adycha, and the valley of the Chibagalakh river of the Indigirka basin, while to the southeast lies the valley of the Charky river. The range stretches in a roughly northwest–southeast direction for about 250 kilometers (160 mi). The highest peak is an unnamed 2,449 metres (8,035 ft) high peak.

The Borong Range, another subrange of the Chersky Mountains, rises to the west parallel to it, the smaller Porozhny Range to the south, the Dogdo Range to the north and the Chemalgin Range to the northeast. Lake Tabanda is located in the range.

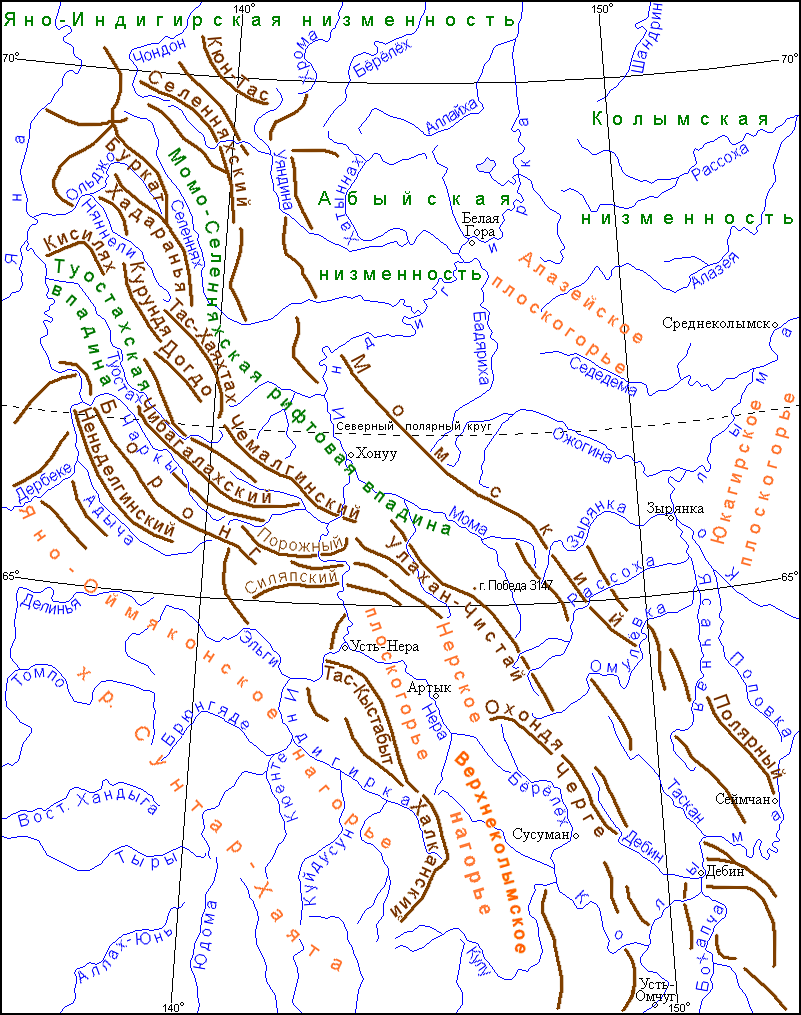
Schematic map of the Chersky System, with the Chibagalakh range roughly in the center/left.

== Flora ==
There are forests of larch covering the mountain slopes. At higher elevation there is a belt of dwarf cedar and further up mountain tundra.

== See also ==
- List of mountains and hills of Russia
