= Kisilyakh Range =

Mountain range in Russia

- Кисиляхский хребет / Киһилээх
- Location within Sakha Republic

Highest point
- Elevation: 1,548 m (5,079 ft)

Dimensions
- Length: 80 km (50 mi)
- Width: 20 km (12 mi)

Geography
- Country: Russia
- Federal subject: Sakha Republic
- Range coordinates: 68°10′N 136°0′E
- Parent range: Chersky Range, East Siberian System

Geology
- Rock ages: Triassic, Jurassic and Cretaceous
- Rock types: Shale, mudstone, siltstone, Sandstone, granite and granitoid intrusions

Climbing
- Easiest route: From Batagay

The Kisilyakh Range (Russian: Кисиляхский хребет; Yakut: Киһилээх, romanized: Kihileex) is a mountain range in the Sakha Republic, Far Eastern Federal District, Russia. The nearest city is Batagay, and the nearest airport Batagay Airport.

The mountains are topped by kigilyakh rock formations. Some of the finest kigilyakhs in Yakutia are located in this range, the tallest among them reaching a height of 30 meters (98 ft). Kisilyakh means "Mountain having a man" or "Mountain married" in the Yakut language.

== Geography ==
The Kisilyakh Range rises at the northeastern end of the Chersky Range, in the Sakha region. The mountains are of middle height and the range is one of the smallest of the system. It stretches in a roughly WNW/ESE direction for about 80 kilometers (50 mi). The highest peak is 1,548 metres (5,079 ft) high. The range consists of two ridges divided into an eastern and western part by a cleft.

The Khadaranya and the Ymiysky ranges, other northern subranges of the Chersky Mountains, rise further to the east, beyond the Nenneli, a tributary of the Oldzho river. The Kurundya Range rises to the east and southeast. The Adycha River flows across the range in its western part and the Tuostakh, one of its main tributaries, to the south.

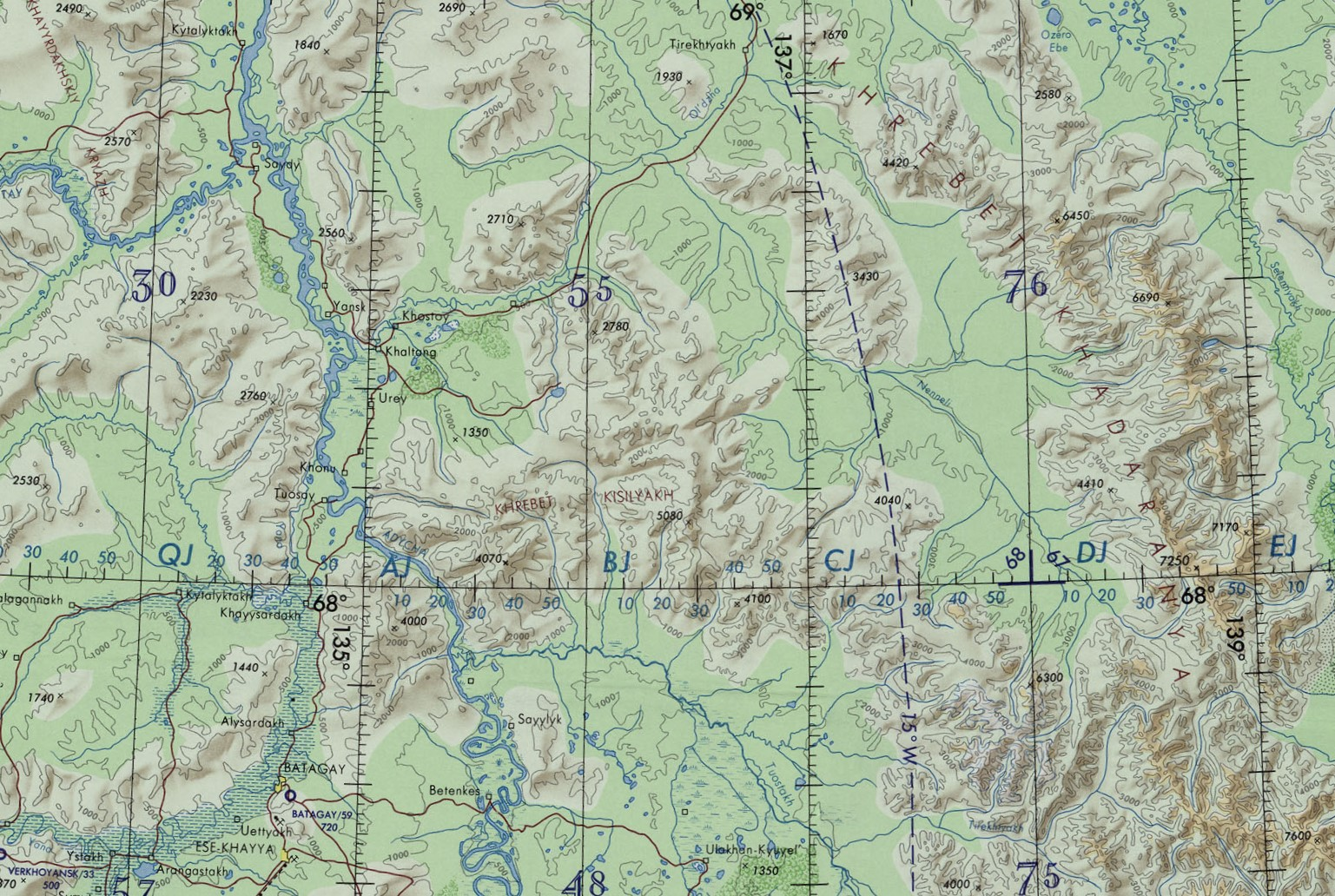
Map section centered on the Kisilyakh Range

== See also ==
- Kigilyakh
