= Borulakh =

- Mouth location in Yakutia, Russia
- Native name: Боруулаах (Yakut)

Location
- Federal subject: Yakutia, Russia

Physical characteristics
- Source
  - location: Yana Plateau
  - coordinates: 66°39′50″N 134°43′0″E
  - elevation: ca 800 m (2,600 ft)
- Mouth: Adycha
  - coordinates: 67°14′40″N 135°30′9″E
- Length: 316 km (196 mi)
- Basin size: 9,470 km^{2} (3,660 sq mi)

Basin features
- Progression: Adycha→ Yana→ Laptev Sea

The Borulakh (Russian: Борулах; Yakut: Боруулаах, Boruulaax) is a river in the Republic of Sakha in Russia. It is a left hand tributary of the Adycha, of the Yana basin. It is 316 kilometres (196 mi) long, with a drainage basin of 9,470 square kilometres (3,660 mi^{2}).

The river is not navigable. It usually freezes in October and stays under thick ice until June.

== Course ==
The river begins in the Yana Plateau and flows all the way along it. It heads first roughly north strongly meandering in its middle and lower course then is bends to the northeast around the Tirekhtyakh Range mountain area. Finally it joins the Adycha downstream from the Nelgese, the largest tributary.

There are about 350 lakes in the river basin. The main tributaries of the Borulakh are the Kaltysy and Khatyngnakh.

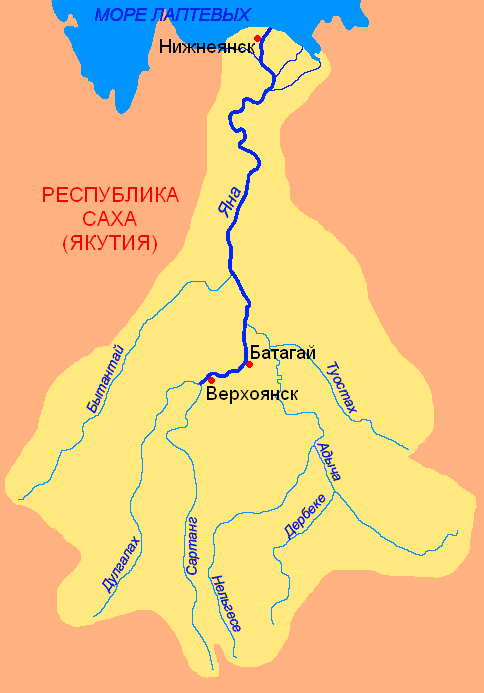
Basin of the Yana.

== See also ==
- List of rivers of Russia
- Yana-Oymyakon Highlands§Hydrography
