= Nendelgin Range =

Mountain range in Yakutia, Russia

- Нендельгинский хребет / Нэндэльгэ
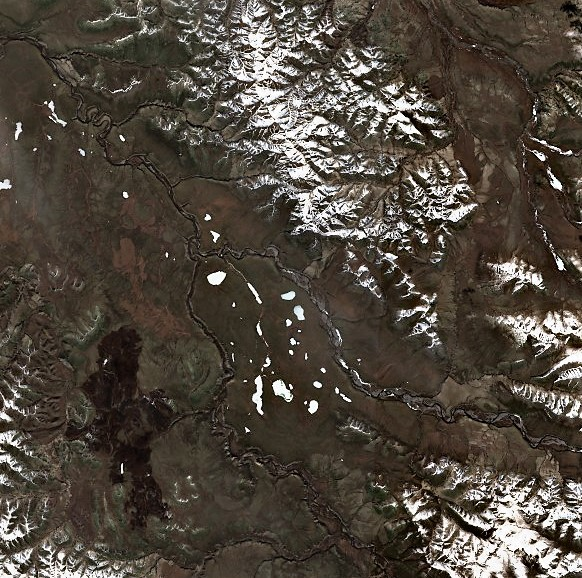
- Central section of the Nendelgin Range Sentinel-2 image.

Highest point
- Peak: Unnamed
- Elevation: 1,777 m (5,830 ft)

Dimensions
- Length: 170 km (110 mi) NW/SE
- Width: 15 km (9.3 mi) NE/SW

Geography
- Location within Sakha Republic
- Country: Russia
- Federal subject: Sakha Republic
- Range coordinates: 66°02′N 137°21′E
- Parent range: Chersky Range, East Siberian System

The Nendelgin Range (Russian: Нендельгинский хребет; Yakut: Нэндэльгэ) is a mountain range in Tompo District, Yakutia, Russian Federation. The nearest city is Batagay to the north.

== Geography ==
The Nendelgin rises at the western edge of the central area of the Chersky System. The range stretches in a roughly southeast to northwest direction for about 170 kilometers (110 mi), rising above the right bank of the Adycha river. The 134 kilometers (83 mi) long Delakag (Dzholakag or Dyolukaakh), a right tributary of the Adycha, cuts across the mountain chain roughly in the central part, dividing it into two parts. The highest point of the range is 1,777 metres (5,830 ft) high and is located in the southern part.

The Nendelgin marks the northeastern limit of the Yana Plateau. The higher Borong Range, another subrange of the Chersky Mountains, rises to the east.

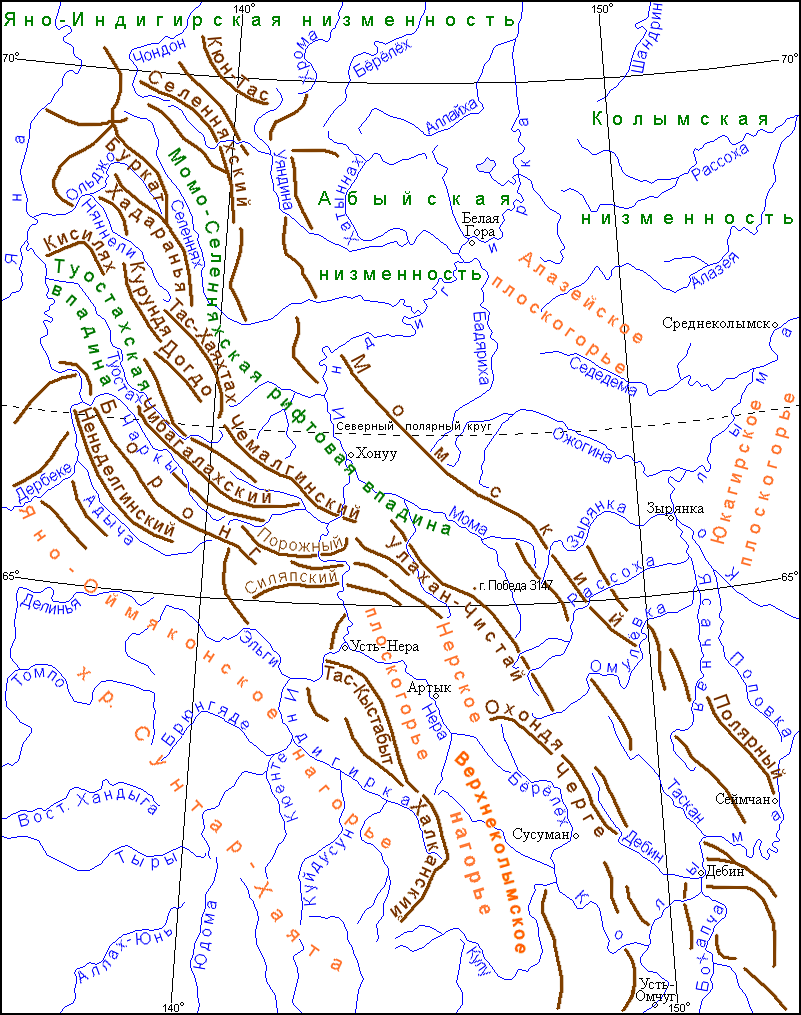
Schematic map of the Chersky System, with the Nendelgin in the left side.

== See also ==
- List of mountains and hills of Russia
