= Derbeke-Nelgesinsky mine =

Silver mine in Russia

- Location in the Sakha Republic
- Location: Derbeke basin, Sakha Republic, Russia; 68°15′N 136°30′E
- Products: Silver

The Derbeke-Nelgesinsky mine is one of the largest silver mines in Russia and in the world. The mine is located in the Nelgesin Range area, Sakha Republic. The mine has estimated reserves of 160 million oz of silver.
