= Nera Plateau =

- Ньара хаптал хайалаах сирэ Нерское плоскогорье
- Location within Far Eastern Federal District

Highest point
- Peak: Khulamryn
- Elevation: 2,077 m (6,814 ft)

Dimensions
- Length: 130 km (81 mi)
- Width: 70 km (43 mi)
- Area: 20,000 km^{2} (7,700 mi^{2})

Geography
- Country: Russia
- Federal subject: Sakha Republic, Magadan Oblast
- Range coordinates: 64°0′N 145°30′E
- Parent range: East Siberian System

Geology
- Rock ages: Triassic and Jurassic
- Rock types: Siltstone, shale and sandstone

The Nera Plateau (Russian: Нерское плоскогорье, Yakut: Ньара хаптал хайалаах сирэ) is a mountain plateau in the southeastern Sakha Republic (Oymyakon District) and the northwestern end of Magadan Oblast (Susumansky District), Far Eastern Federal District, Russia.

The Ust-Nera - Magadan tract of the R504 Kolyma Highway crosses the plateau from northwest to southeast. There are gold placers in certain spots of the Nera Plateau.

== Geography ==
The Nera Plateau is at the source area of the Nera River, a tributary of the Indigirka. Other rivers on it are the Ayan-Yuryakh, one of the rivers that form the Kolyma, and the Byoryolyokh, an Ayan Yuryakh tributary. The plateau is limited by ranges of the Chersky mountain system to the northeast, the Upper Kolyma Highlands to the southeast and the Tas-Kystabyt (Sarychev Range) to the southwest.

The average elevations of the plateau surface lie between 700 metres (2,300 ft) and 1,500 metres (4,900 ft). The highest summit is Khulamryn (гора Хуламрин), a 2,077 feet (633 m) high peak.

== Flora ==
The plateau is in an area dominated by permafrost. There are sparse larch forests on the plateau and thickets of dwarf cedar and alder up to elevations from 1,100 metres (3,600 ft) to 1,200 metres (3,900 ft), above which there is only mountain tundra.

== See also ==
- Oymyakon Plateau
