= East Siberian Mountains =

Mountain range in Russia

- Восточно-Сибирское нагорье
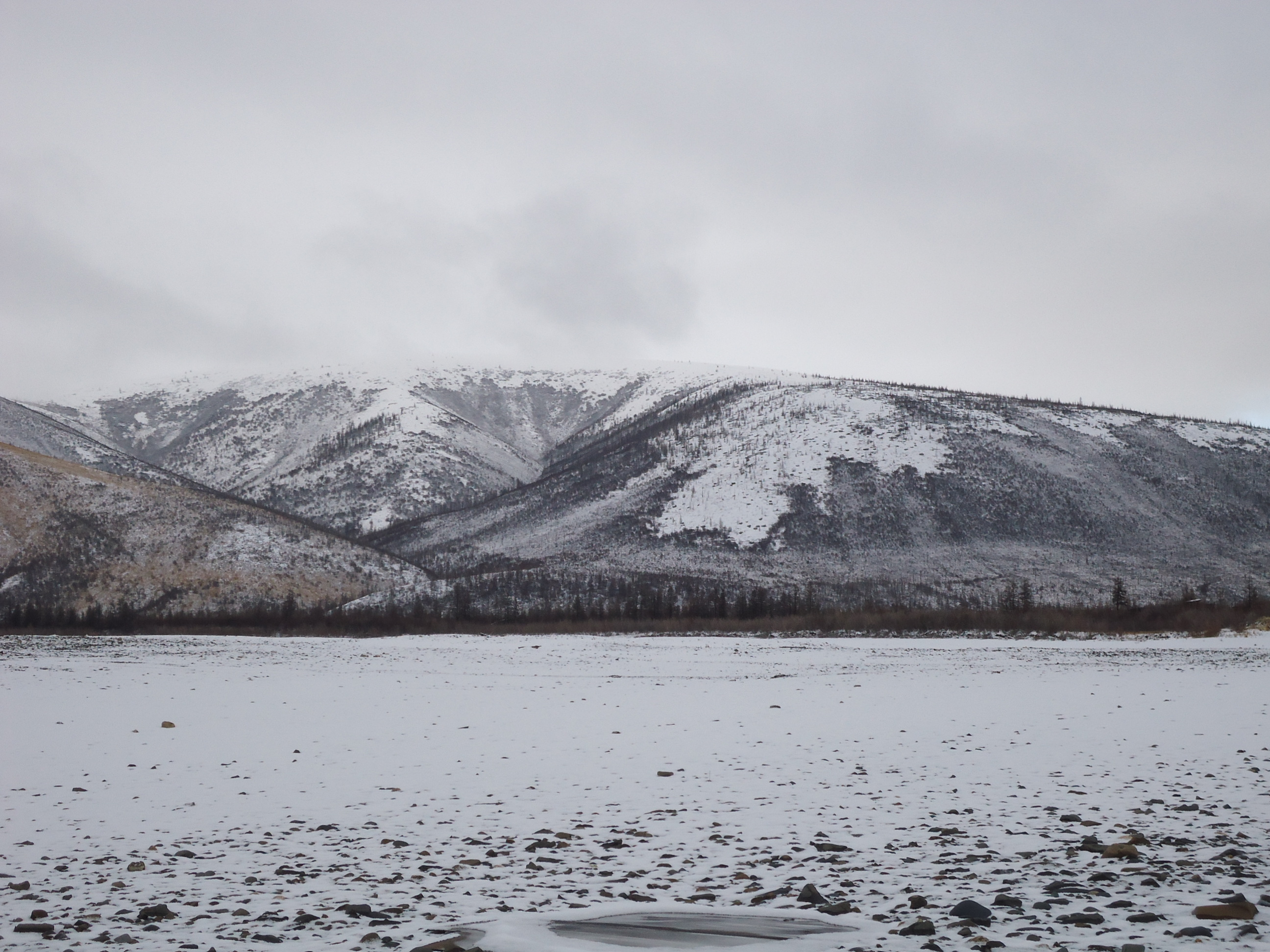
- View of the northern end of the Chersky Range

Highest point
- Peak: Pobeda
- Elevation: 3,003 m (9,852 ft)
- Coordinates: 65°10′38″N 146°00′35″E

Dimensions
- Length: 2,700 km (1,700 mi)
- Width: 1,200 km (750 mi)
- Area: 2,000,000 square kilometres (770,000 sq mi)

Geography
- Location within Russia
- Country: Russia
- Federal subjects: Sakha Republic, Magadan Oblast, Chukotka Autonomous Okrug, Kamchatka Krai and Khabarovsk Krai
- Range coordinates: 65°N 158°E
- Borders on: Central Yakutian Lowland, East Siberian Lowland and South Siberian Mountains

Geology
- Orogeny: Alpine orogeny

Climbing
- Easiest route: From Yakutsk or Magadan

The East Siberian Mountains or East Siberian Highlands (Russian: Восточно-Сибирское нагорье, romanized: Vostochno-Sibirskoye Nagorye) are one of the largest mountain systems of the Russian Federation. They are located between the Central Yakutian Lowland and the Bering Strait in Northeast Siberia. The area of the East Siberian Mountains has a very low population density. The territory of the mountain system is one of the Great Russian Regions.

In some areas of the East Siberian Mountains, such as the Kisilyakh Range and the Oymyakon Plateau there are kigilyakhs, the rock formations that are highly valued in the culture of the Yakuts.

== Geography ==
The East Siberian System consists of several separate sections of mountain ranges rising to the north and south of the Arctic Circle. The main group of ranges stretches for a distance of nearly 3,000 kilometres (1,900 mi) from the Lena River valley to Cape Dezhnyov, at the eastern end of the Chukotka Peninsula. Although it reaches a width of roughly 1,200 kilometres (750 mi), the highland region is almost cut in half by the East Siberian Lowland that stretches to the north in the central area. To the southwest the boundary is not clearly delimited, as it overlaps with the system of the South Siberian Mountains. Owing to the mountainous terrain, large swathes of the East Siberian system are uninhabited. The largest city is Magadan.

=== Ranges ===
- Verkhoyansk Range
  - Kharaulakh Range
  - Kular Range
  - Sietinden Range
  - Orulgan Range
  - Dzhardzhan Range
  - Muosuchan Range
  - Munni Range
  - Kelter Range
  - Ust-Vilyuy Range
  - Sette-Daban
  - Skalisty Range
  - Ulakhan-Bom
  - Kyllakh Range
- Suntar-Khayata Range
- Yana-Oymyakon Highlands
  - Elgi Plateau
  - Oymyakon Plateau
  - Yana Plateau
  - Nelgesin Range
  - Tirekhtyakh Range
- Kyundyulyun
- Chersky Range
  - Khadaranya Range
  - Ymiysky Range
  - Kisilyakh Range
  - Selennyakh Range
  - Moma Range
  - Ulakhan-Chistay Range
  - Arga-Tas
  - Silyap Range
  - Chibagalakh Range
  - Nendelgin
  - Tas-Kystabyt
- Upper Kolyma Highlands
  - Angachak Range
- Kyun-Tas
- Polousny Range
- Kondakov Plateau
- Suor Uyata
- Ulakhan-Sis Range
- Alazeya Plateau
- Yukaghir Highlands
- Nera Plateau
- Kolyma Mountains
  - Omsukchan Range
  - Oloy Range
  - Ush-Urekchen
  - Kedon Range
  - Kongin Range
  - Maymandzhin Range
- Anadyr Highlands
  - Anadyr Plateau
  - Anyuy Range
  - Ilirney Range
  - Kyrganay Range
  - Chuvanay Range
  - Shchuchy Range
- Chukotka Mountains
  - Chantal Range
  - Pekulney Range
  - Shelag Range
- Dzhugdzhur Mountains
- Koryak Mountains
  - Ichigem Range
  - Olyutor Range
  - Ukelayat Range
  - Komeutyuyam Range
  - Rarytkin Range
  - Ukvushvuynen Range

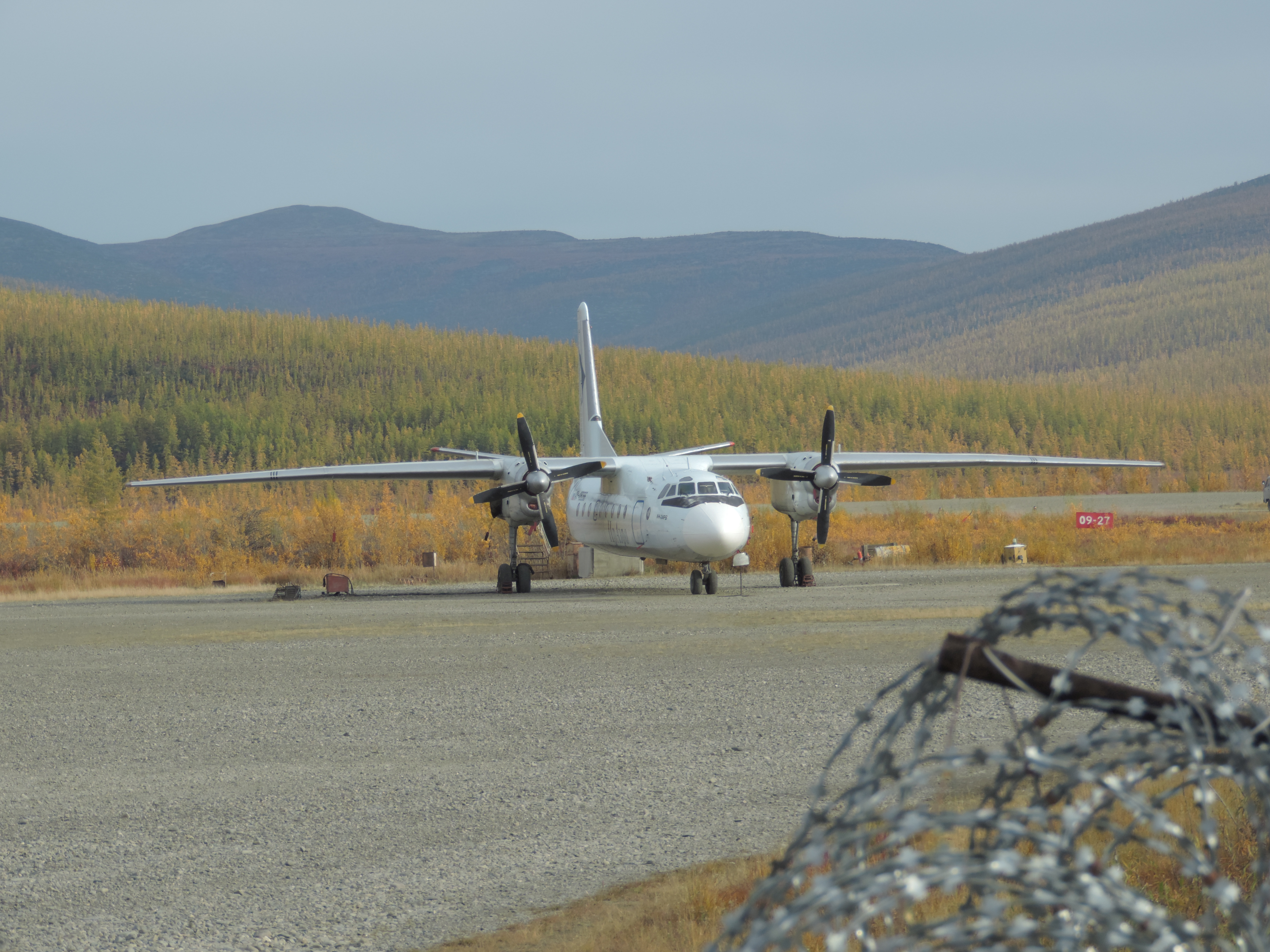
Mountain taiga in the summer. Kyrganay Range.

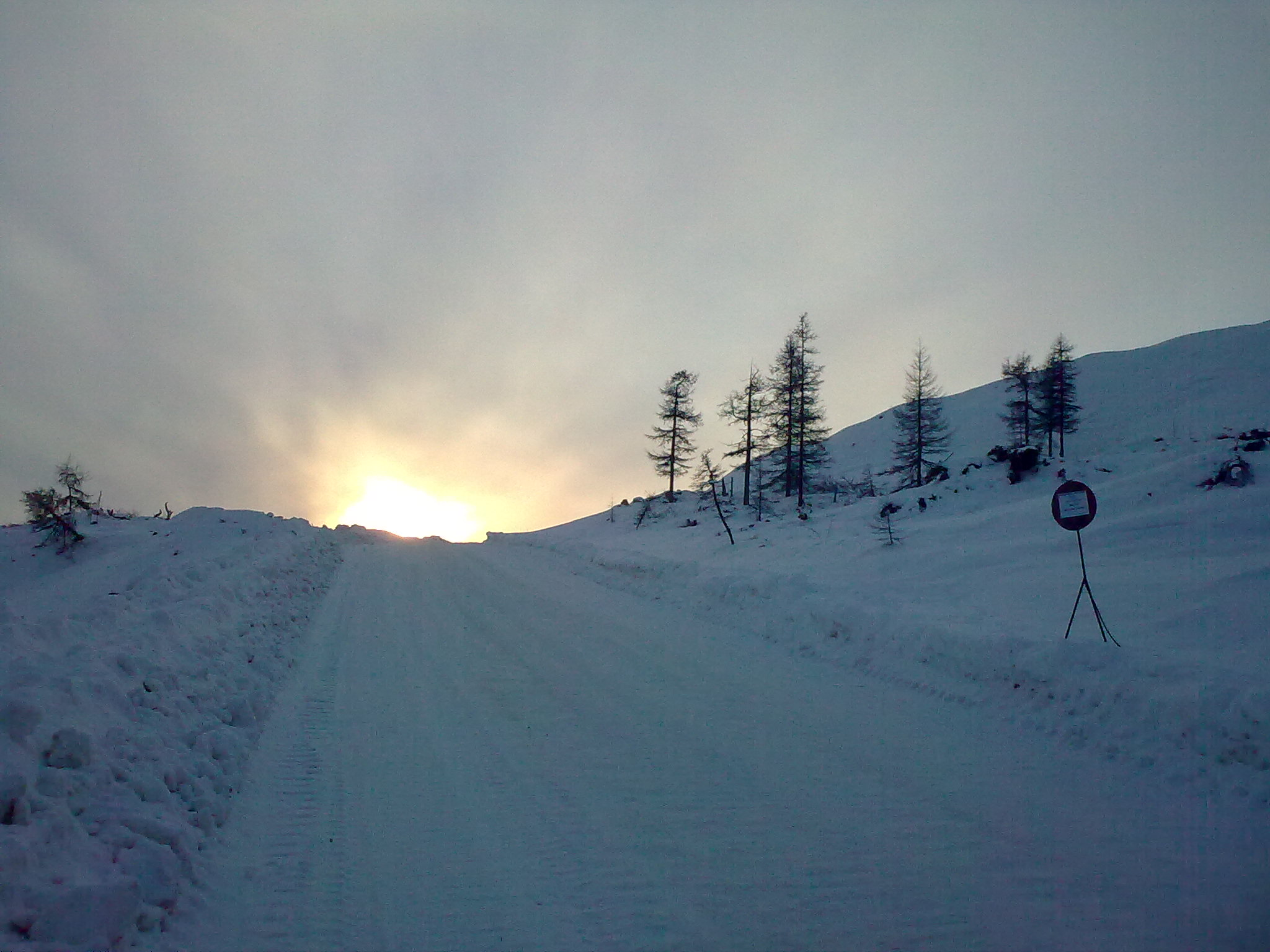
Winter road near Goltsovoy Mine, Kolyma Range.

=== Hydrography ===
The main rivers of the vast region are the Yana, Indigirka, Kolyma and its tributary Omolon, as well as the Anadyr.

== Climate, flora and fauna ==
The world's lowest temperatures for inhabited places have been recorded in this region. In the south of the East Siberian Mountain System lies the area of the famous Oymyakon Depression, where record low temperatures are registered, even though the region is about 3,000 kilometres (1,900 mi) to the south of the geographic North Pole.

The lower elevations of the ranges, as well as the valleys, are largely covered by taiga. Rivulets and humid areas in lower altitudes of most of the ranges of the system provide a habitat for the Siberian Salamander, a species known for surviving deep freezes —as low as −45 °C (−49 °F).

=== Ecoregions ===
- Cherskii-Kolyma mountain tundra
- Chukchi Peninsula tundra
- Northeast Siberian taiga

== See also ==
- Moma Natural Park
