= Angachak Range =

Mountain range in Russia

- Ангачак
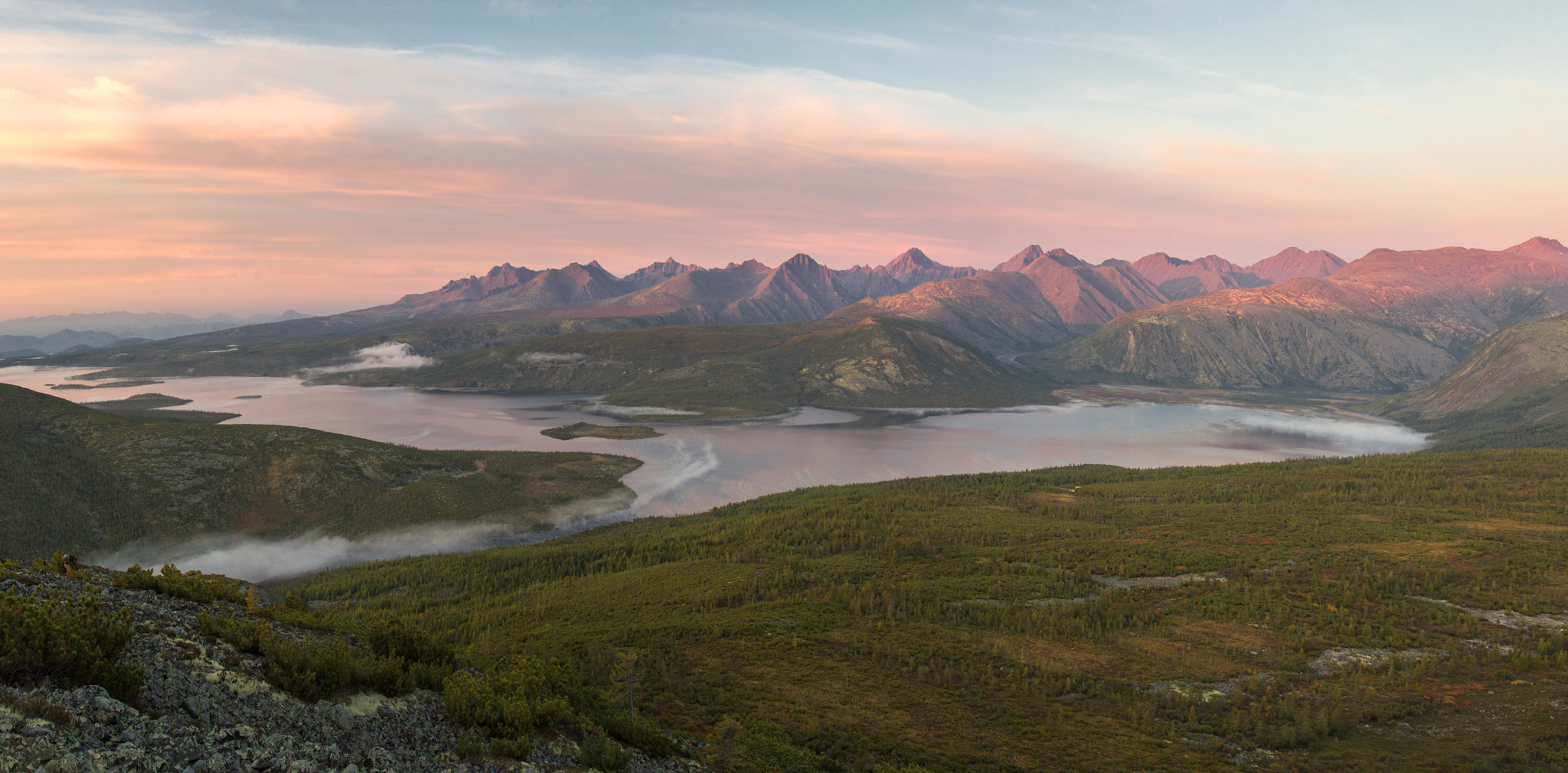
- View of the range above Jack London Lake

Highest point
- Peak: Gora Snezhnaya
- Elevation: 2,293 m (7,523 ft)

Dimensions
- Length: 80 km (50 mi)
- Width: 20 km (12 mi)

Geography
- Location within Far Eastern Federal District
- Country: Russia
- Federal subject: Magadan Oblast
- Range coordinates: 62°0′N 149°20′E
- Parent range: Chersky Range, East Siberian System

Geology
- Orogeny: Alpine orogeny
- Rock type: Granite

Climbing
- Easiest route: From Susuman

The Angachak Range (Russian: хребет Ангачак; also "Большой Ангачак" —"Big Angachak") is a mountain range in the Magadan Oblast, Far Eastern Federal District, Russia. The nearest city is Susuman, and the nearest airport Susuman Airport.

== Geography ==
The Angachak Range rises at the northern end of the Upper Kolyma Highlands, in the southernmost sector of the Chersky Range System. The range is bound by the Kolyma River valley from the south and in the north it connects with the main ridge of the Chersky Range. Formerly the highest summit was thought to be Pik Aborigen, but updated measurements have found that it wasn't 2,586 metres (8,484 ft) high, but 2,286 metres (7,500 ft) high. Thus the highest mountain of the range is 2,293 metres (7,523 ft) high Gora Snezhnaya.

The range stretches in a roughly NW/SE direction for about 100 kilometers (62 mi). There are numerous rivers, waterfalls and lakes in the area. In the western part lies Lake Jack London, just beneath Pik Aborigen.

== Flora and climate ==
The slopes are covered by sparse larch taiga up to between 1,200 metres (3,900 ft) and 1,300 metres (4,300 ft), above which grow Siberian pine thickets. The higher elevations have only mountain tundra.

The zone of the Angachak Range has a harsh continental subarctic climate. January temperatures vary from −31 °C (−24 °F) to −35 °C (−31 °F). In summer the average July temperature does not exceed 12 °C (54 °F). There are often avalanches in the mountains, and snowstorms are also frequent.
