= Bytantay =

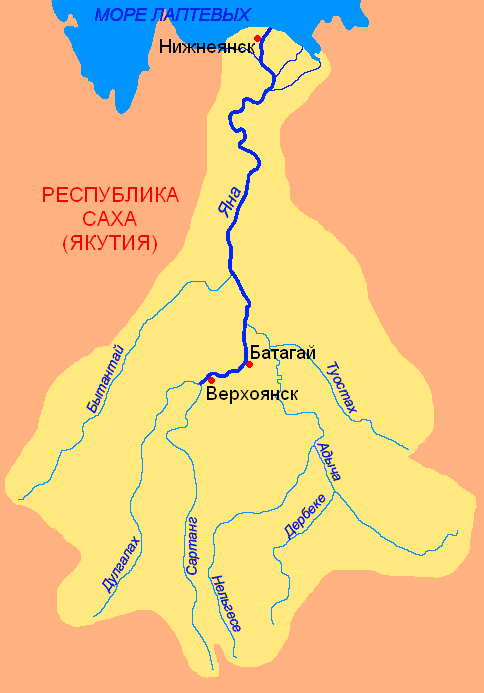
- Basin of the Yana.
- Native name: Бытантай (Russian)

Location
- Country: Yakutia, Russia

Physical characteristics
- Source
  - location: Verkhoyansk Range
  - elevation: 1,280 m (4,200 ft)
- Mouth: Yana
  - coordinates: 68°45′42″N 134°25′17″E
  - elevation: 81 m (266 ft)
- Length: 586 km (364 mi)
- Basin size: 40,200 km^{2} (15,500 sq mi)
- Discharge
  - average: 153 m^{3}/s (5,400 cu ft/s)

Basin features
- Progression: Yana→ Laptev Sea

The Bytantay (Russian: Бытантай; Yakut: Бытантай, Bıtantay) is a river in the Republic of Sakha in Russia. It is a left hand tributary of the Yana, and is 620 kilometres (390 mi) long, with a drainage basin of 40,200 square kilometres (15,500 mi^{2}).

== Course ==
The river begins in the eastern flank of the Verkhoyansk Range at an elevation of 1,280 metres (4,200 ft). It heads roughly northeast with the Kular Range to the northwest and then joins river Yana from the left 532 kilometres (331 mi) from its mouth. There are more than two thousand lakes in the basin of the Bytantay.

The main tributaries of the Bytantay are Billah and Tenki on the right; and Khobol, Achchygy-Sakkyryr, Ulakhan-Sakkyryr and Kulgaga-Suoh on the left. The Ulakhan-Sakkyryr joins the Bytantay a short distance to the east of Batagay-Alyta.

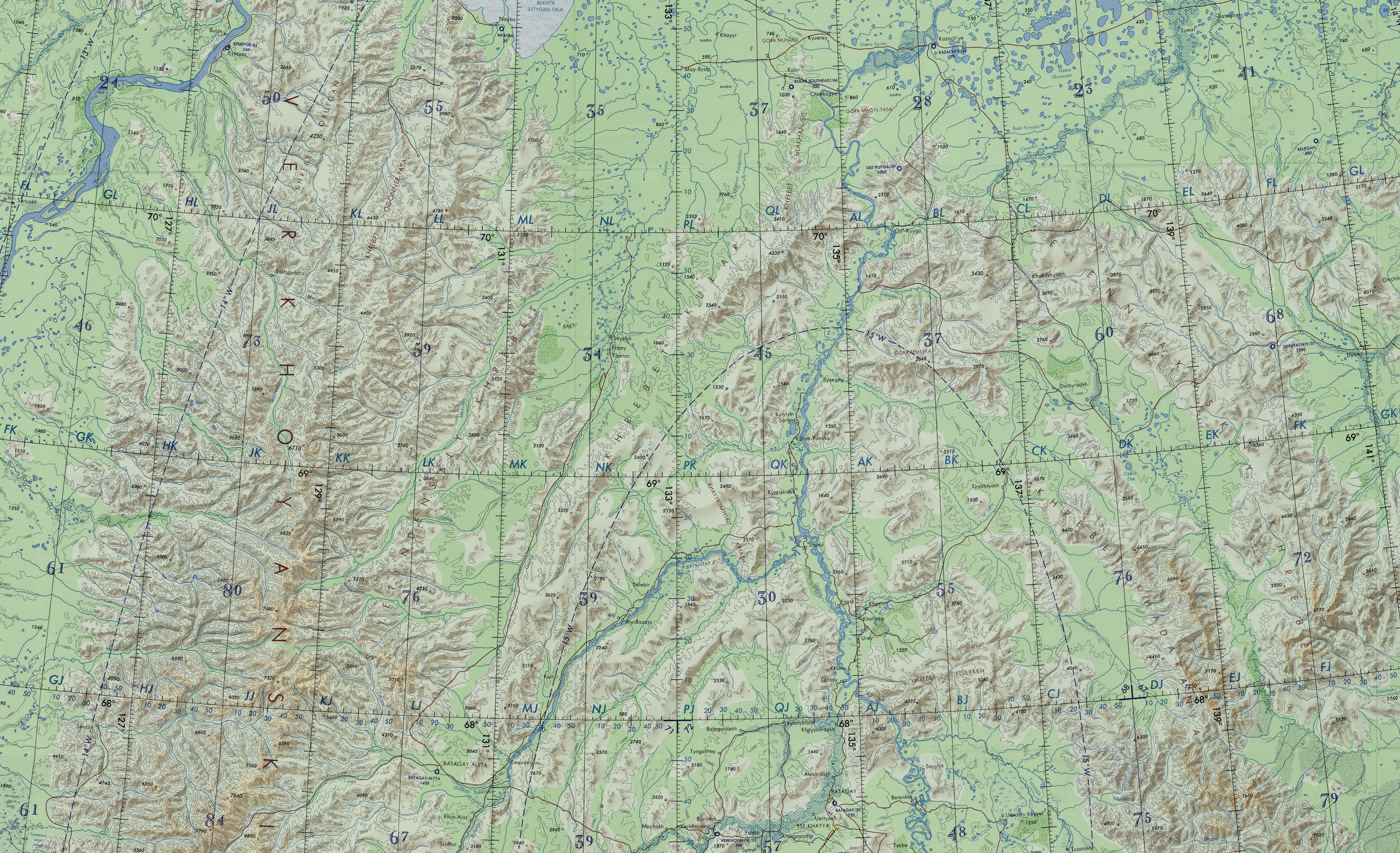
Map section showing the Kular Range in the middle and the lower course of the Bytantay.

== See also ==
- List of rivers of Russia
- Yana Plateau
- Yana-Oymyakon Highlands§Hydrography
