= Nelgese =

- Mouth location in Yakutia, Russia
- Native name: Нэльгэһэ (Yakut)

Location
- Federal subject: Yakutia, Russia

Physical characteristics
- Source
  - location: Verkhoyansk Range
  - coordinates: 64°26′52″N 134°8′3″E
  - elevation: 1,620 m (5,310 ft)
- Mouth: Adycha
  - coordinates: 66°42′21″N 136°31′33″E
  - elevation: 295 m (968 ft)
- Length: 566 km (352 mi)
- Basin size: 15,200 km^{2} (5,900 sq mi)
- Discharge
  - average: 61.3 m^{3}/s (2,160 cu ft/s)

Basin features
- Progression: Adycha→ Yana→ Laptev Sea

The Nelgese (Russian: Нельгесе; Yakut: Нэльгэһэ, Nelgehe) is a river in the Republic of Sakha in Russia. It is a left hand tributary of the Adycha, of the Yana basin. It is 566 kilometres (352 mi) long, with a drainage basin of 15,200 square kilometres (5,900 mi^{2}).

The river flows across a desolate area of severe climate, with continuous permafrost.

== Course ==
The Nelgese is the longest tributary of the Adycha. It begins between two high ranges of the Verkhoyansk Range, running approximately from north to south to the west of the Khunkhadin Range. It heads roughly north across the Yana Plateau of the Yana-Oymyakon Highlands in a wide, swampy area dotted with ancient lakes. Then it turns northeast between the Nelgesin Range and the Tirekhtyakh Range, flowing through a narrow valley before it joins the Adycha 78 km downstream from the mouth of the Derbeke and 13 km upstream from the mouth of the Charky.

The Nelgese has many tributaries. The main ones are the Sordong and the Kordekan; the latter is the only one exceeding 100 km (62 mi) in length. The river freezes in late September or early October and is under thick ice until the end of May.

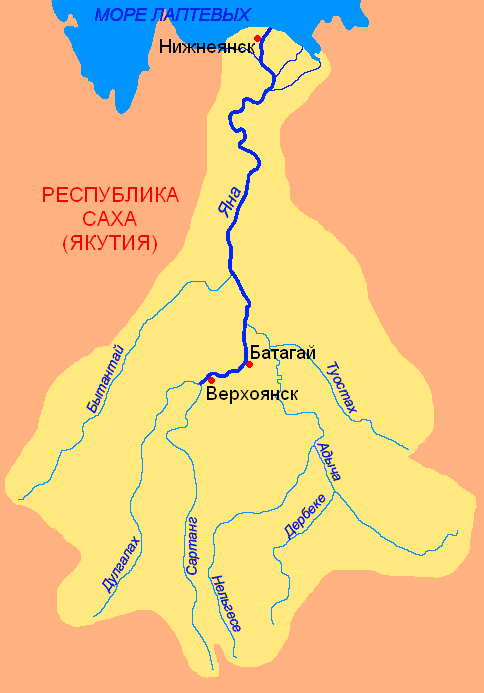
Basin of the Yana. The Nelgese in the lower central part.

=== Hydrology ===
Average monthly flow of the Nelgese based on data collected between 1967 and 1997.

== See also ==
- List of rivers of Russia
- Yana-Oymyakon Highlands§Hydrography
