= Emanda =

Lake in the country of Russia

- Эмандьа
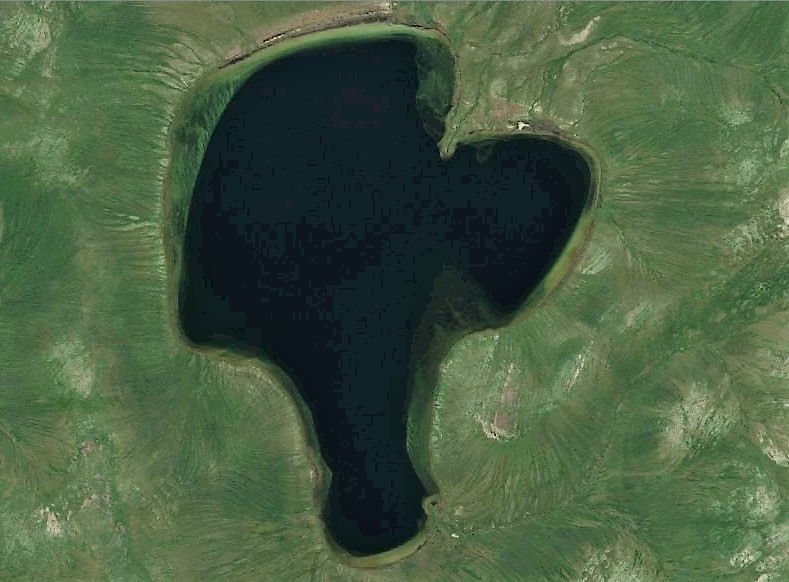
- Sentinel-2 image of the lake

- Location in the Sakha Republic, Russian Far East
- Location: Yana Plateau
- Coordinates: 65°15′0″N 135°54′0″E
- Primary outflows: Seen River
- Catchment area: 179 km^{2} (69 sq mi)
- Basin countries: Russia
- Surface area: 33.1 km^{2} (12.8 sq mi)
- Surface elevation: 678 m (2,224 ft)
- Frozen: October to May

Emanda (Russian: Еманда or Эманджа, Yakut: Эмандьа, romanized: Emanca) is a freshwater lake in Tomponsky District, Sakha Republic, Russia. The lake is located in a desolate area where there is no permanent population and few visitors. There are burbot, pike and grayling in its waters.

== Geography ==
The lake lies at 678 m (2,224 ft) above mean sea level in the basin of the Derbeke River, part of the Yana basin. It is located to the east of the river, roughly 50 km (31 mi) to the south of the Nelgesin Range. Lake Emanda is the largest lake of the Yana Plateau.

The Seen River (Сеен), a right hand tributary of the Derbeke, is the outflow of the lake.

The minimum temperature of -58.6 °C (-73.5 °F) recorded on December 5, 2023, in Emanda, being the lowest December temperature in 40 years, according to weather historian Thierry Goose.

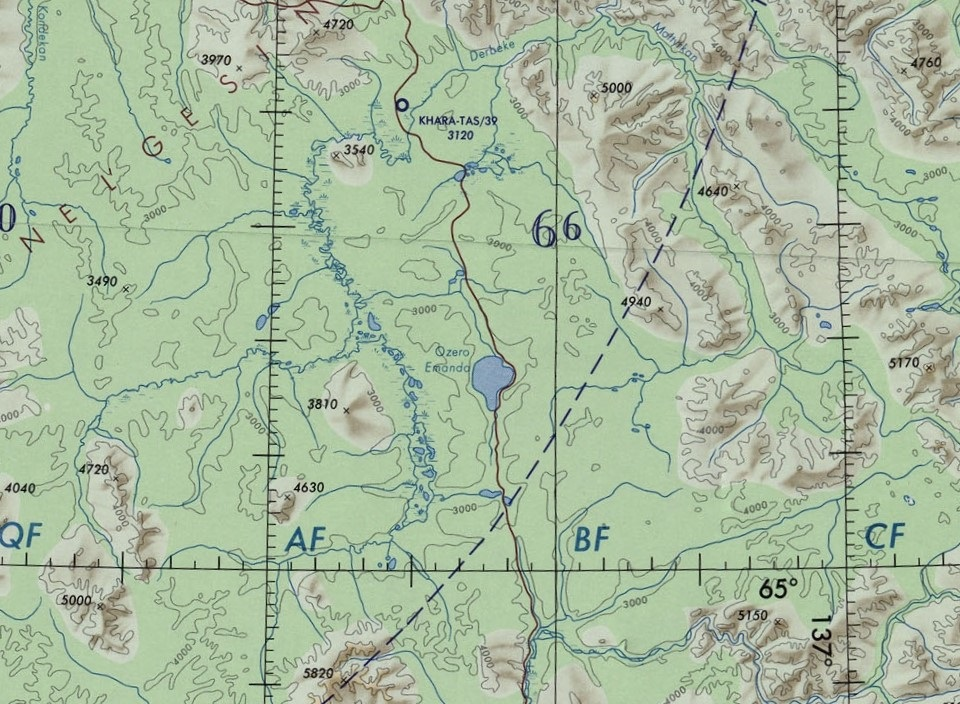
Map section centered on Lake Emanda

== See also ==
- List of lakes of Russia
- Yana-Oymyakon Highlands
