= Jack London Lake =

Lake in Magadan, Russia

- Озеро Джека Лондона (Russian)
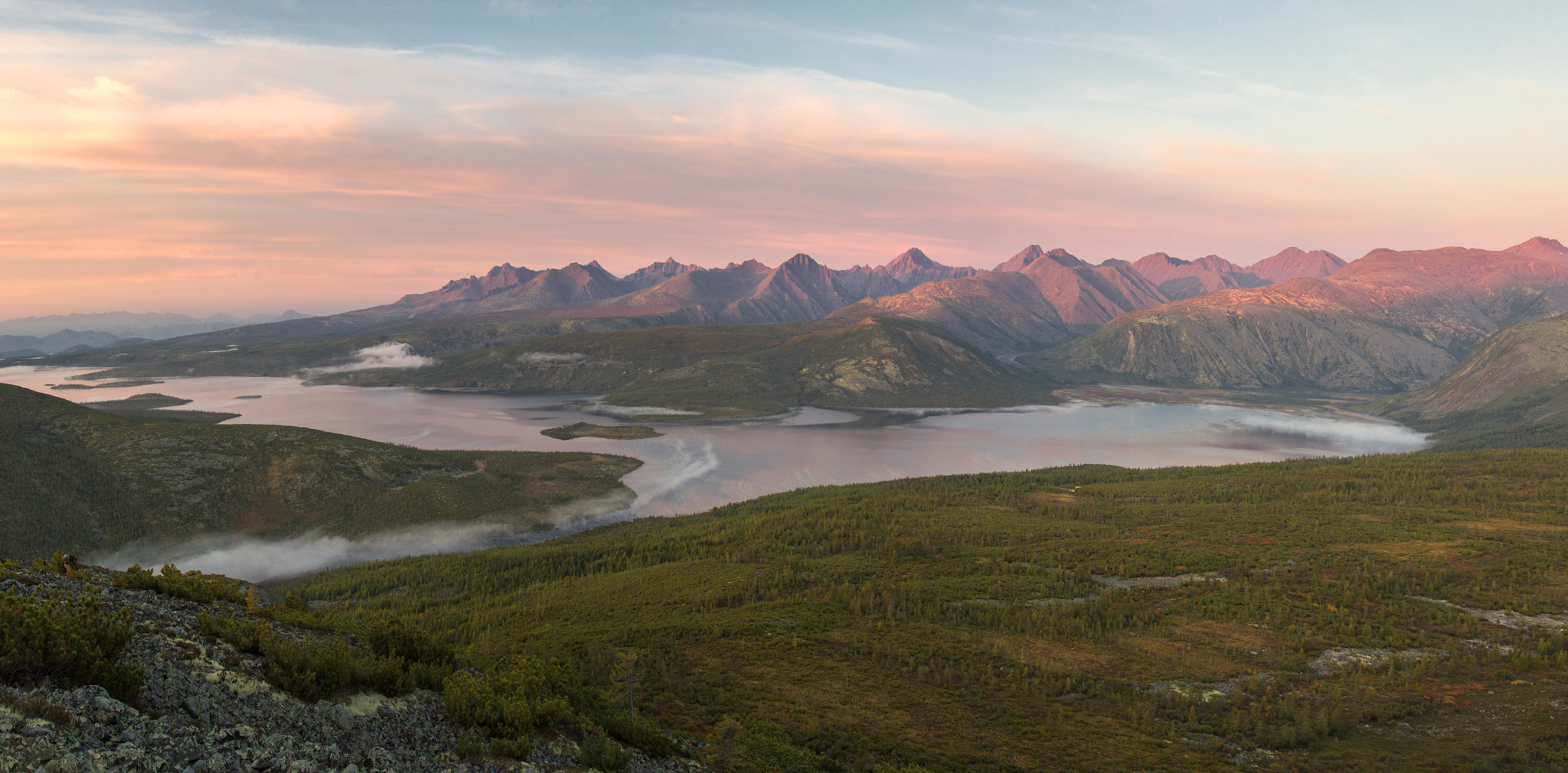

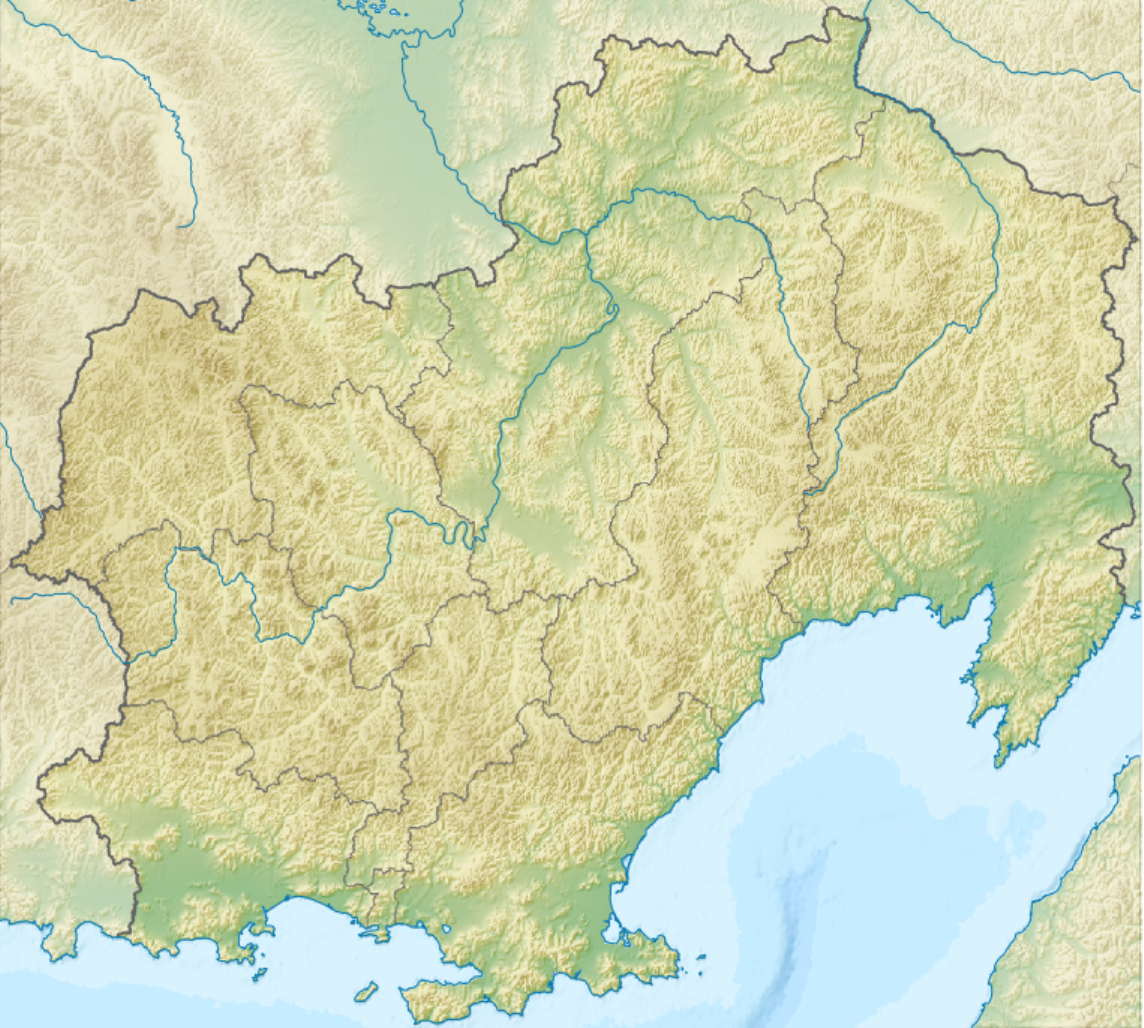
- Location
- Location: Yagodninsky District; Magadan Oblast, Russia
- Coordinates: 62°04′49″N 149°31′43″E
- Lake type: freshwater lake, ribbon lake
- Primary inflows: Purga River
- Primary outflows: Kyuyel-Sien → Kolyma River
- Catchment area: 221 km^{2} (85 sq mi)
- Basin countries: Russia
- Max. length: 10 km (6.2 mi)
- Max. width: 2 km (1.2 mi)
- Surface area: 14.4 km^{2} (5.6 sq mi)
- Average depth: 50 m (160 ft)
- Surface elevation: 803 m (2,635 ft)
- Frozen: October to June
- Islands: 4

Jack London Lake (Russian: Озеро Джека Лондона, romanized: Ozero Dzheka Londona) is a 14.5 km^{2} (5.6 sq mi) mountain lake located in the Yagodninsky District of Magadan Oblast, Russia.

It was named in 1932 in honor of American writer, journalist and socialist activist Jack London by Russian geologist P. Skornyakov, following the wish of Yuri Bilibin, the head of the first geological expedition to Kolyma, who had expressed the idea to name one of the yet unnamed geographical locations in the Far Northeast after the writer.

== Geography ==
The lake lies 803 metres (2,635 ft) above sea level between the Angachak Range (Russian: Ангачак) to the west and the Uaza-Ina to the east, on the upper reaches of the Kolyma basin. The outflow is the Kiuyel-Sien, a Kolyma River tributary.

The lake contains four islands. There is a weather station on Vera Island (Russian: Остров Вера). The area of the lake is part of the Jack London Lake Nature Park, a protected area (national park).

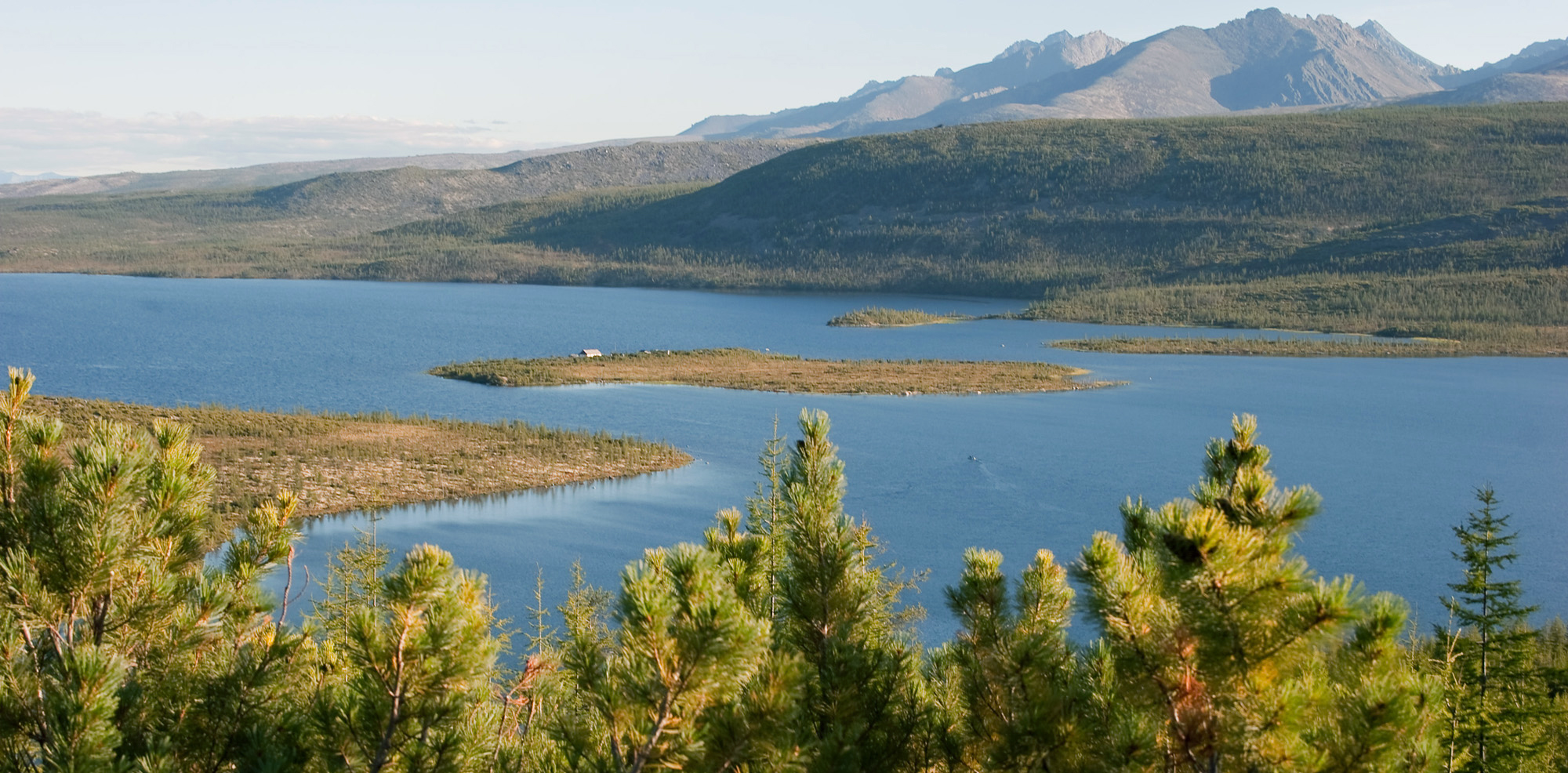
View of Jack London Lake

== See also ==
- List of lakes of Russia
