= Tas-Kystabyt =

Mountain range in Russia

- Таас Кыстаабыт / Тас-Кыстабыт; Sarychev Range
- Location within Far Eastern Federal District

Highest point
- Peak: Unnamed
- Elevation: 2,341 m (7,680 ft)

Dimensions
- Length: 175 km (109 mi) NNW / SSE

Geography
- Country: Russia
- Federal subject: Sakha Republic and Magadan Oblast
- Range coordinates: 63°50′N 144°0′E
- Parent range: Chersky Range, East Siberian System
- Borders on: Oymyakon District and Susuman District

Geology
- Orogeny: Alpine orogeny
- Rock types: Siltstone, mudstone and Granite intrusions

Climbing
- Easiest route: From Susuman or Ust-Nera

The Tas-Kystabyt (Russian: Тас-Кыстабыт, Yakut: Таас Кыстаабыт, romanized: Tass Kıstaabıt) is a mountain range in the Sakha Republic and Magadan Oblast, Far Eastern Federal District, Russia. It is also known as "хребе́т Са́рычева" —Sarychev Range, in honor of 19th century Russian cartographer Admiral Gavril Sarychev.

== Geography ==
The Tas-Kystabyt rises in the southeasternmost sector of the Chersky Range System. The range is bound by the upper Indigirka River valley and its tributary, the Nera River. The highest mountain of the range is an unnamed 2,341 metres (7,680 ft) high summit.

The range stretches in a roughly NNW/SSE direction for about 175 kilometers (109 mi). It separates the Oymyakon Plateau to the west from the Nera Plateau to the northeast. To the east it is bound by the Upper Kolyma Highlands and to the south it overlaps with the Suntar Khayata Range.

== Flora ==
The lower slopes of the range are covered by sparse larch taiga. The higher elevations have only mountain tundra.
