= Derbeke =

- Mouth location in Yakutia, Russia
- Native name: Дэрбэкэ (Yakut)

Location
- Federal subject: Yakutia, Russia

Physical characteristics
- Source
  - location: Khunkhadin Range
  - coordinates: 64°42′41″N 135°6′47″E
  - elevation: 1,350 m (4,430 ft)
- Mouth: Adycha
  - coordinates: 66°11′16″N 136°49′50″E
  - elevation: 400 m (1,300 ft)
- Length: 389 km (242 mi)
- Basin size: 14,100 km^{2} (5,400 sq mi)
- Discharge
  - average: 70 m^{3}/s (2,500 cu ft/s)

Basin features
- Progression: Adycha→ Yana→ Laptev Sea

The Derbeke (Russian: Дербеке; Yakut: Дэрбэкэ) is a river in the Republic of Sakha in Russia. It is a left hand tributary of the Adycha, of the Yana basin. It is 389 kilometres (242 mi) long, with a drainage basin of 14,100 square kilometres (5,400 mi^{2}).

It is an excellent river for boating, but it flows in an area without permanent population.

== Course ==
The river begins in a rocky gorge in the eastern flank of the Khunkhadin Range, part of the southern section of the Verkhoyansk Range. It heads roughly north and northeast, leaving the Verkhoyansk mountains, and meandering slowly across a swampy area in the Yana Plateau with numerous lakes, including Emanda (Yakut: Эмандьа). The river gains speed again in its lower course at the feet of the southeastern side of the Nelgesin Range when it flows through a narrow mountain valley. Finally it joins the Adycha upstream from the Nelgese, the largest tributary.

The main tributaries of the Derbeke are the Tenkeli and the Kende. The river freezes in late September and is under thick ice until the end of May. For part of the winter it is usually frozen to the bottom.

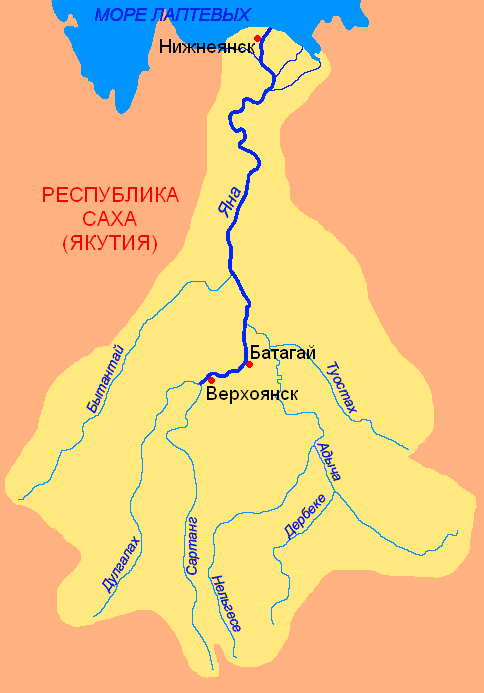
Basin of the Yana. The Derbeke in the lower central part.

== See also ==
- List of rivers of Russia
- Yana-Oymyakon Highlands§Hydrography
