= Charky =

- Mouth location in Yakutia, Russia
- Native name: Чаркы (Russian)

Location
- Federal subject: Yakutia, Russia

Physical characteristics
- Source
  - location: Onelsky Ridge, Chersky Range
- Mouth: Adycha
  - coordinates: 66.7659°N 136.7483°E
- Length: 276 km (171 mi)
- Basin size: 8,320 km^{2} (3,210 sq mi)

Basin features
- Progression: Adycha→ Yana→ Laptev Sea

The Charky (Russian: Чаркы; Yakut: Чаркы, Çarkı), also known as Muolakaan (Муолакаан), is a river in the Republic of Sakha in Russia. It is a right hand tributary of the Adycha, of the Yana basin. It is 276 kilometres (171 mi) long, with a drainage basin of 8,320 square kilometres (3,210 mi^{2}).

Ammonite fossils of the Jurassic have been found in the river basin.

== Course ==
The river begins in the southern slopes of the Onelsky Ridge of the Chersky Range. It heads roughly northwestwards through a valley located between the Chibagalakh Range on the northern side and the Borong Range in the southern. Shortly before joining the Adycha it bends southwards and again northwestwards. Finally it joins the Adycha very close downstream from the mouth of the Nelgese, the largest tributary.

The river usually freezes in early October and stays frozen until late May. Its largest tributary is the Dyalyndya on the left.

The village of Ust-Charky is located on the right bank of the Adycha, a little downstream from its confluence with the Charky.

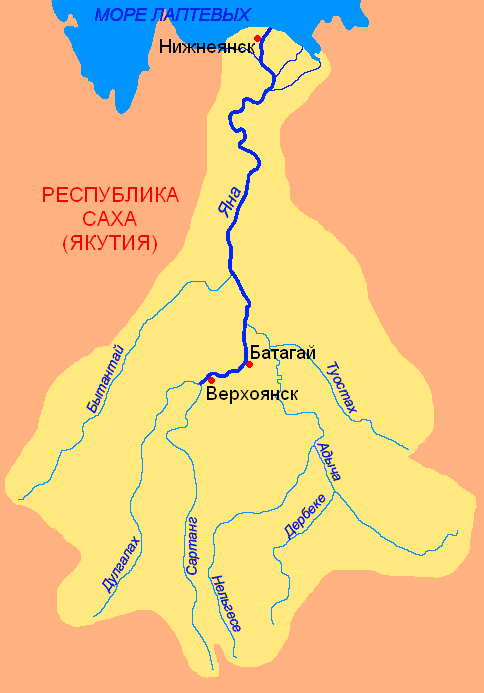
Basin of the Yana.

== See also ==
- List of rivers of Russia
- Yana-Oymyakon Highlands§Hydrography
