= Yana-Oymyakon Highlands =

- Яно-Оймяконское нагорье Дьааҥы хаптал хайалара
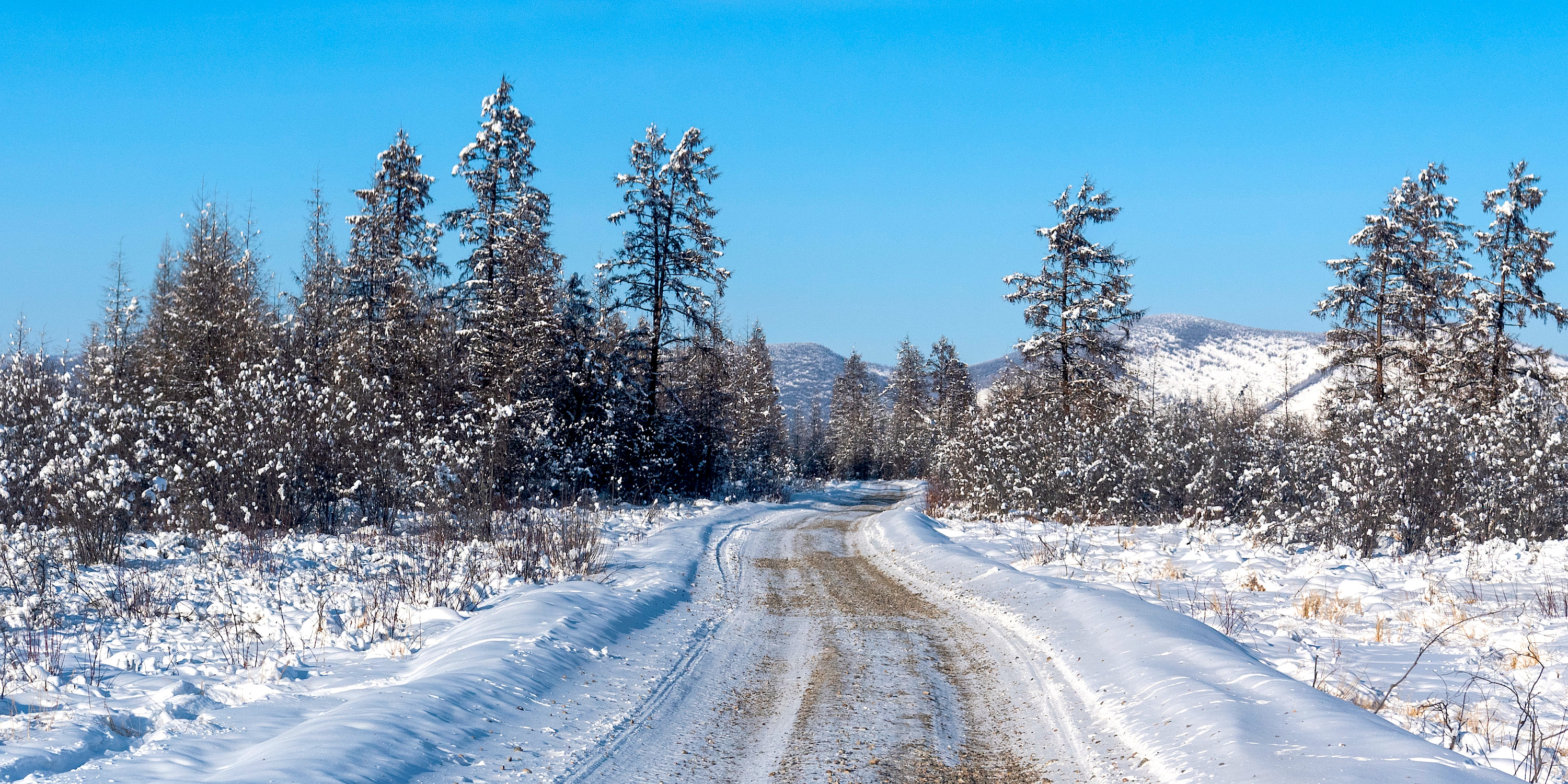
- Landscape in Oymyakon

Highest point
- Peak: up to 2,000 meters (6,600 ft)

Dimensions
- Length: 1,100 km (680 mi)
- Width: 1,050 km (650 mi)
- Area: 1,155,000 km^{2} (446,000 mi^{2})

Geography
- Location within Far Eastern Federal District
- Country: Russia
- Federal subject: Sakha; Khabarovsk Krai; Magadan Oblast
- Range coordinates: 63°40′N 143°20′E
- Parent range: East Siberian System

Geology
- Rock age: Proterozoic
- Rock type(s): Sandstone, siltstone, clay, shale

The Yana-Oymyakon Highlands (Russian: Яно-Оймяконское нагорье, romanized: Yano-Oymyakonskoye Nagorye; Yakut: Дьааҥы хаптал хайалара, romanized: Caañı xaptal xayalara), also known as Oymyakon Highlands (Russian: Оймяконское нагорье, romanized: Oymyakonskoye Nagorye), are a mountainous area in the Sakha Republic, Khabarovsk Krai and Magadan Oblast, Far Eastern Federal District, Russia. The area is named after the main features of the highlands.

Kigilyakhs are found in some places of the plateaus. These are rock formations that are valued in Yakut culture.

== Geography ==
The Yana-Oymyakon Highlands are a mountain region of the East Siberian System located between the southern reaches of the Verkhoyansk Range to the west, the Suntar-Khayata Range to the southwest and the Chersky mountain range to the northeast. The main highland features are the vast Yana Plateau in the northwest, the Elgi Plateau in the middle and the Oymyakon Plateau in the southeast. The highlands include the Kuydusun and Agalkin intermontane basins, as well as mountain chains of moderate altitude, such as the Nelgesin and Tirekhtyakh ranges.

The average height of the plateau surface is between 300 meters (980 ft) and 700 meters (2,300 ft) in the upper course of the Yana River to the northwest, and to the southeast between 1,400 meters (4,600 ft) and 1,500 meters (4,900 ft) in the Oymyakon plateau. Individual peaks of the ranges rise up to 2,000 meters (6,600 ft).

The whole zone is characterized by harsh, cold winters and is very sparsely populated. The main towns are Oymyakon and Verkhoyansk, the latter close to the northwestern end of the highland area.

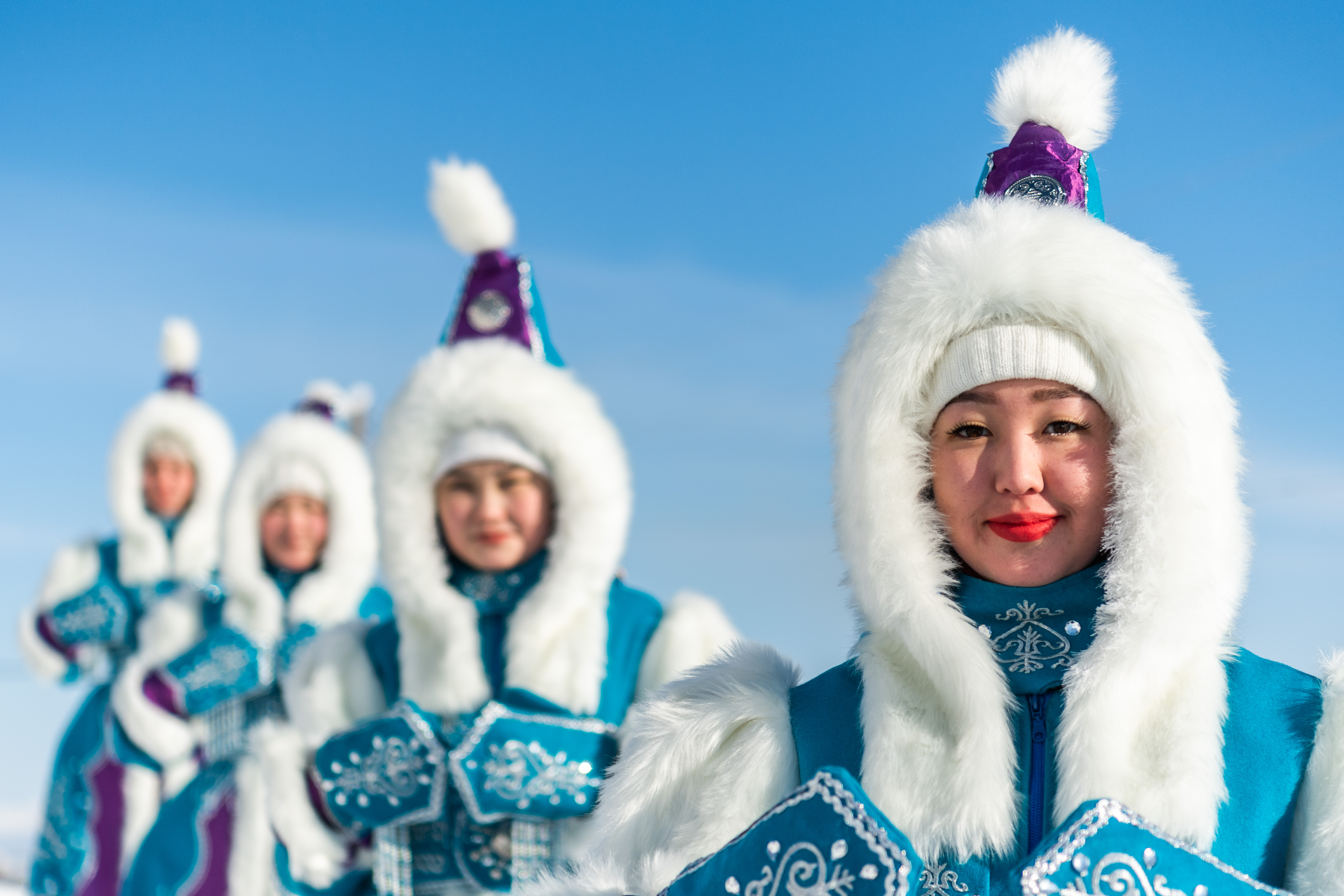
Women of Oymyakon.

== Hydrography ==
The upper course of the Yana River flows through the northwestern part of the Yana-Oymyakon Highlands with its following tributaries: Bytantay, Dulgalakh, Sartang, Adycha, Borulakh, Nelgese, Derbeke and Charky, among others. The Delinya, a right tributary of the Tompo—part of the Lena basin, flows from the central part of the highlands, and the Indigirka River flows in the southeastern part with its tributaries Tuora-Yuryakh, Kuydusun, Agayakan, Kyuyente, Elgi, and other minor ones.

== Flora ==
Forests of larch taiga generally cover the lower slopes of the mountain ranges and there are steppe areas in some places on the southern slopes. The mountaintops are covered with mountain tundra. Willows and poplars may grow in the floodplains of the intermontane basins.
