= Oymyakon Plateau =

Mountain range

- Оймяконское плоскогорье
- Location within Far Eastern Federal District

Highest point
- Peak: Dzhakai-Tasa
- Elevation: 1,891 m (6,204 ft)

Dimensions
- Length: 50 km (31 mi)
- Width: 30 km (19 mi)

Geography
- Country: Russia
- Federal subject: Sakha Republic
- Range coordinates: 63°15′N 141°30′E
- Parent range: Yana—Oymyakon Highlands, East Siberian System

Geology
- Rock types: Sandstone, granite and intrusions

The Oymyakon Plateau (Russian: Оймяконское плоскогорье, Yakut: Өймөкөөн үрдэлэ, romanized: Öymököön ürdele) is a mountain plateau in the Sakha Republic, Far Eastern Federal District, Russia.

The plateau is in the area of the famous Oymyakon Depression, where record low temperatures are registered, although the region is about 3,000 kilometres (1,900 mi) to the south of the geographic North Pole.

The Oymyakon Plateau is one of the areas of Yakutia where kigilyakhs are found.

== Geography ==
The Oymyakon Plateau is located in the eastern Sakha Republic, in the upper course of the Indigirka River. Together with the Yana Plateau to the north, and the Elgi Plateau to the northwest, it is part of the Yana—Oymyakon Highlands. The plateau is limited by the Chersky Range to the east and by the Suntar-Khayata and the Tas-Kystabyt range of the Verkhoyansk Range to the west, connecting both mountain regions. The highest elevations are found in the mountain massifs rising above the plateau; the highest point is 1,891 metres (6,204 ft) high Dzhakai-Tasa.

== Climate and flora ==
The elevation of the plateau surface has two clearly delimited zones and in the intermontane basins, frosty air is trapped in the winter creating inversions. This leads to an average nighttime temperature in January of about −50 °C (−58 °F) in some areas.

There are taiga type forests of larch up to 1,200 metres (3,900 ft) and mountain tundra in the higher elevations.

== See also ==
- Oymyakon town
