= Adycha =

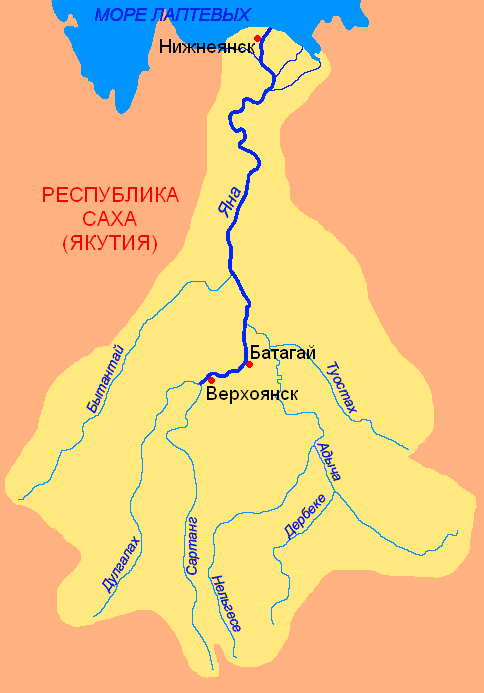
- Basin of the Yana.
- Native name: Адыаччы (Yakut)

Location
- Country: Yakutia, Russia

Physical characteristics
- Source
  - location: Chersky Range
  - coordinates: 65°35′36″N 140°11′2″E
  - elevation: 1,900 m (6,200 ft)
- Mouth: Yana
  - coordinates: 68.2132°N 134.7703°E
  - elevation: 108 m (354 ft)
- Length: 715 km (444 mi)
- Basin size: 89,800 km^{2} (34,700 sq mi)
- Discharge
  - average: 512 m^{3}/s (18,100 cu ft/s)

Basin features
- Progression: Yana→ Laptev Sea

The Adycha (Russian: Адыча; Yakut: Адыаччы, romanized: Adıaççı) is a river in the Republic of Sakha in Russia. It is a right hand tributary of the Yana, and is 715 kilometres (444 mi) long, with a drainage basin of 89,800 square kilometres (34,700 mi^{2}).

At the end of the Soviet period, a big dam with a hydroelectric station was planned to be built on the river, but following perestroika and economic difficulties in the country the project was given up.

== Course ==
The river begins in the western flank of the Chersky Range at an elevation of 1,900 metres (6,200 ft). It heads first westwards and then roughly northwestwards, flanking the western side of the Nendelgin Range across a wide river valley. After bending around the northern end of the Tirekhtyakh Range it heads northwards and meanders strongly. Finally, after flowing across the western end of the Kisilyakh Range, it joins river Yana from the right about 30 kilometres (19 mi) to the north of Batagay and roughly 30 kilometres (19 mi) to the south of the confluence with the Oldzho. The river is also known as "Borong" (Russian: Боронг) in a section of its upper course.

River Adycha freezes in October and is under thick ice until the end of May. For about 4½ months it is frozen to the bottom. Part of the river is navigable after the thaw.

=== Tributaries ===
The main tributaries of the Adycha are Delakag (Делакаг), Charky (Чаркы) and Tuostakh (Туостах) on the right; and Derbeke (Дербеке), Nelgese (Нельгесе) and Borulakh (Борулах) on the left.

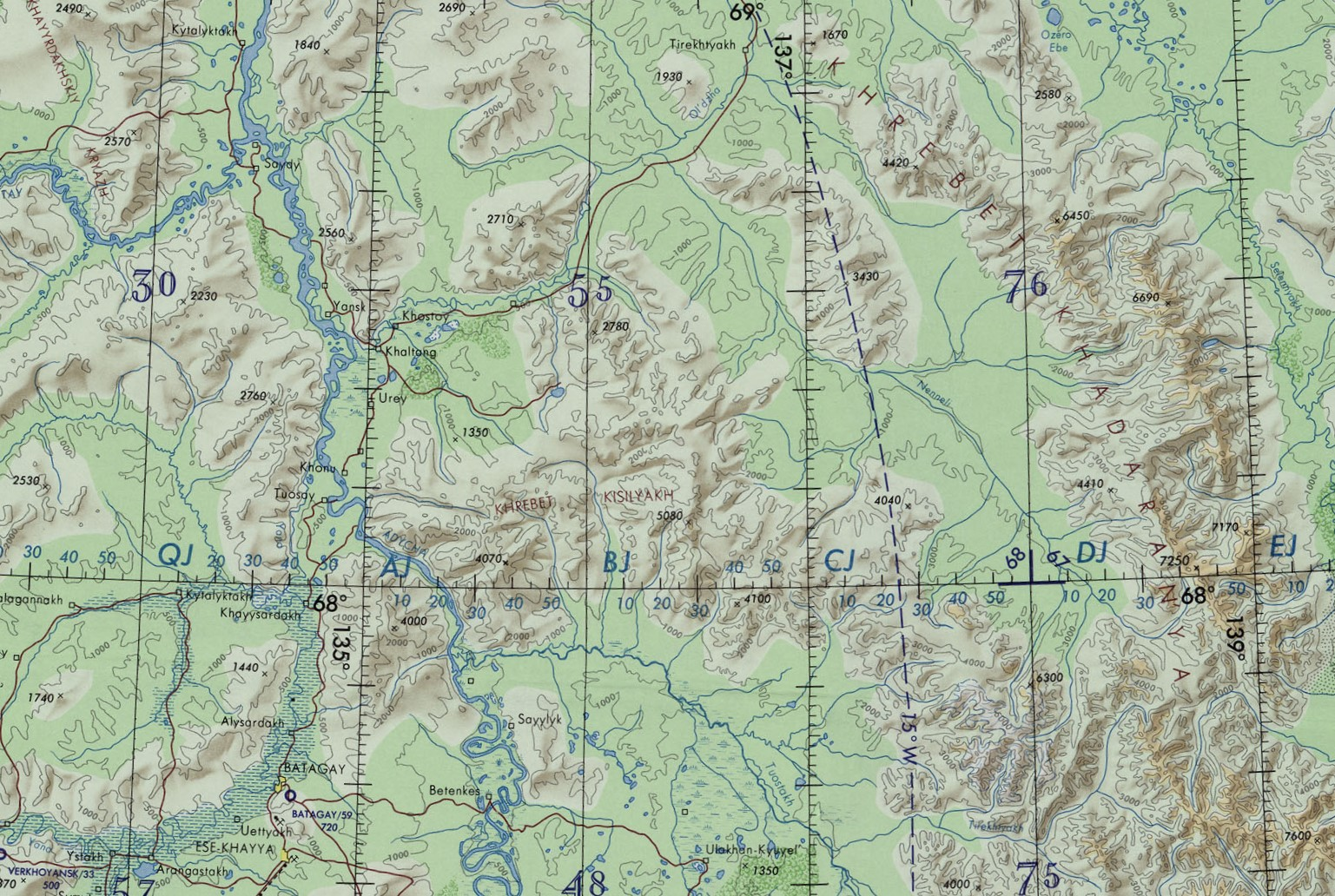
Map section showing the Kisilyakh Range in the middle and part of the course of the Adycha on the left.

== Flora ==
Taiga and forest tundra predominate in the valley of the river.

== See also ==
- List of rivers of Russia
- Yana Plateau
- Yana-Oymyakon Highlands§Hydrography
