= Batagay Airport =

Airport in Russia

- IATA: BQJ; ICAO: UEBB; LID: БТГ

Summary
- Airport type: Public
- Operator: Airports of the North
- Serves: Batagay, Verkhoyansky District, Sakha Republic, Russia
- Elevation AMSL: 213 m / 699 ft
- Coordinates: 67°38′52″N 134°41′37″E
- Website: sever.aero/batagay/

Maps
- Sakha Republic in Russia

- Location of the airport in the Sakha Republic

Runways
Direction	Length		Surface
Direction	m	ft	Surface
05/23	2,000	6,562	Gravel
- Sources: GCM, STV

Batagay Airport (Yakut: Батаҕай Aэропорт) (IATA: BQJ, ICAO: UEBB) is an airport serving the urban locality of Batagay, Verkhoyansky District, in the Sakha Republic of Russia, ashore the Yana River.

== Airlines and destinations ==
Airlines	Destinations
Polar Airlines	Yakutsk

== See also ==
- List of airports in Russia
