= Batagay =

Batagay Батагай
- Urban-type settlement

Other transcription(s)
  - Yakut: Баатаҕай
- Interactive map of Batagay
- Location of Batagay Batagay (Sakha Republic)
- Coordinates: 67°39′N 134°39′E
- Country: Russia
- Federal subject: Sakha Republic
- Administrative district: Verkhoyansky District
- SettlementSelsoviet: Batagay
- Founded: 1939
- Urban-type settlement status since: 1945
- Elevation: 138 m (453 ft)

Population (2010 Census)
  - Total: 4,369
  - Estimate (2023): 3,759 (−14%)

Administrative status
  - Capital of: Settlement of Batagay

Municipal status
  - Municipal district: Verkhoyansky Municipal District
  - Urban settlement: Batagay Urban Settlement
  - Capital of: Batagay Urban Settlement
- Time zone: UTC+
- Postal codes: 678500, 678509
- OKTMO ID: 98616151051

Batagay population
- 2010 Census: 4,369
- 2002 Census: 4,589
- 1989 Census: 8,385
- 1979 Census: 6,414

Batagay (Russian: Батага́й; Yakut: Баатаҕай, Baatağay) is an urban locality (an urban-type settlement) and the administrative center of Verkhoyansky District of the Sakha Republic, Russia, located on the Yana River. As of the 2010 Census, its population was 4,369.

== Geography ==
Batagay is located a short distance to the west of river Adycha. The Batagaika crater is located 10 km to the southeast and the Kisilyakh Range 40 km to the northeast of the town.

It has an extreme version of a subarctic climate (Köppen: Dfd), typical of the region.

== History ==
Urban-type settlement status was granted to Batagay in 1945.

== Administrative and municipal status ==
Within the framework of administrative divisions, the urban-type settlement of Batagay serves as the administrative center of Verkhoyansky District. As an administrative division, it is, together with two rural localities, incorporated within Verkhoyansky District as the Settlement of Batagay. As a municipal division, the Settlement of Batagay is incorporated within Verkhoyansky Municipal District as Batagay Urban Settlement.

== Transportation ==
Batagay is served by the Batagay Airport.
