= Permafrost tunnel =

Underground passage dug through permafrost

A permafrost tunnel is an underground passage dug through permafrost for the purpose of facilitating scientific research on climate change and other goals. It allows scientists access to permafrost layers, opening it up to observation and scientific analysis.

The best known example of a permafrost tunnel is probably the Permafrost Tunnel Research Facility in Fox, Alaska, 16 miles north of Fairbanks. It was built in the 1960s and operated by the U.S. Army Corps of Engineers and extends 360 feet into the permafrost. A new operating facility was begun there in 2024. A Russian permafrost laboratory is located beneath the grounds of the Melnikov Permafrost Institute, in Yakutsk, Russia.

== See also ==
- Arctic methane emissions
- Batagaika crater
- Cold Regions Research and Engineering Laboratory
- Cold seeps
- Methane chimney
- Methane emissions
- Pockmark (geology)
- Retrogressive thaw slump
- Thermokarst

== Works cited ==
- Army ERDC (14 March 2024). "Permafrost Tunnel Research Facility". US Army Corps of Engineers Engineer Research and Development Center. Cold Regions Research and Engineering Laboratory.
- Campfield, Justin (26 June 2024). "ERDC breaks ground on new Permafrost Tunnel Operations Facility". Engineer Research & Development Center (U.S. Army Corps of Engineers).
- Hamilton, Thomas D.; Craig, John L.; Sellmann, Paul V. (June 1988). <0948:TFPTAL>2.3.CO;2 "The Fox permafrost tunnel: A late Quaternary geologic record in central Alaska". GSA Bulletin. 100 (6): 948–969.
- Ostrander, Madeline (May 4, 2020). "In a Tunnel Beneath Alaska, Scientists Race to Understand Disappearing Permafrost". Smithsonian.
- Zhdanova, Elena (2021). "MPI Underground laboratory". Melnikov Permafrost Institute. Russian Academy of Sciences.
