= Tomtor =

Tomtor (Russian: Томтор) is the name of several rural localities in the Sakha Republic, Russia:

- Tomtor, Megino-Kangalassky District, Sakha Republic, a selo in Tomtorsky Rural Okrug of Megino-Kangalassky District
- Tomtor, Oymyakonsky District, Sakha Republic, a selo in Borogonsky Rural Okrug of Oymyakonsky District
- Tomtor, Tattinsky District, Sakha Republic, a selo in Bayaginsky Rural Okrug of Tattinsky District
- Tomtor, Ust-Aldansky District, Sakha Republic, a selo in Myuryunsky Rural Okrug of Ust-Aldansky District
- Tomtor, Borulakhsky Rural Okrug, Verkhoyansky District, Sakha Republic, a selo in Borulakhsky Rural Okrug of Verkhoyansky District
- Tomtor, Dulgalakhsky Rural Okrug, Verkhoyansky District, Sakha Republic, a selo in Dulgalakhsky Rural Okrug of Verkhoyansky District
