= Yunkyur =

Yunkyur (Russian: Юнкюр) is the name of several rural localities in the Sakha Republic, Russia:

- Yunkyur, Olyokminsky District, Sakha Republic, a selo in Malzhagarsky Rural Okrug of Olyokminsky District
- Yunkyur, Verkhoyansky District, Sakha Republic, a selo in Sartansky Rural Okrug of Verkhoyansky District
