= Yurdyuk-Kumakh =

Yurdyuk-Kumakh Юрдюк-Кумах Үрдүк Кумах (Sakha)
- Selo
- Interactive map of Yurdyuk-Kumakh
- Location of Yurdyuk-Kumakh Yurdyuk-Kumakh (Sakha Republic)
- Coordinates: 68°08′N 134°59′E
- Country: Russia
- Federal subject: Sakha Republic
- Administrative district: Verkhoyansky District
- Rural okrugSelsoviet: Chyorumchinsky Rural Okrug

Population (2010 Census)
  - Total: 1
  - Estimate (2010): 1 (0%)

Municipal status
  - Municipal district: Verkhoyansky Municipal District
  - Rural settlement: Elgessky Rural Settlement
- Time zone: UTC+
- Postal code: 678522
- OKTMO ID: 98616470106

Yurdyuk-Kumakh (Russian: Юрдюк-Кумах; Yakut: Үрдүк Кумах, Ürdük Kumax) is a rural locality (a selo) in Chyorumchinsky Rural Okrug of Verkhoyansky District in the Sakha Republic, Russia, located 93 kilometers (58 mi) from Batagay, the administrative center of the district and 15 kilometers (9.3 mi) from Chyoryumche, the administrative center of the rural okrug. Its population as of the 2010 Census was 1; down from 2 recorded in the 2002 Census. Within the framework of municipal divisions, Yurdyuk-Kumakh is a part of Elgessky Rural Settlement in Verkhoyansky Municipal District.
