= Metyaki =

Metyaki Метяки Мэтэки (Yakut)
- Selo
- Interactive map of Metyaki
- Location of Metyaki Metyaki (Sakha Republic)
- Coordinates: 66°55′N 132°16′E
- Country: Russia
- Federal subject: Sakha Republic
- Administrative district: Verkhoyansky District
- Rural okrugSelsoviet: Arylakhsky Rural Okrug

Population (2010 Census)
  - Total: 16
  - Estimate (2021): 0 (−100%)

Municipal status
  - Municipal district: Verkhoyansky Municipal District
  - Rural settlement: Arylakhsky Rural Settlement
- Time zone: UTC+
- Postal code: 678500
- OKTMO ID: 98616409106

Metyaki (Russian: Метяки; Yakut: Мэтэки, Meteki) is a rural locality (a selo) in Arylakhsky Rural Okrug of Verkhoyansky District in the Sakha Republic, Russia, located 212 kilometers (132 mi) from Batagay, the administrative center of the district, and 70 kilometers (43 mi) from Bala, the administrative center of the rural okrug. Its population as of the 2010 Census was 16; down from 32 recorded in the 2002 Census.
