= Tokuma (rural locality) =

Tokuma Токума Токума (Sakha)
- Selo
- Interactive map of Tokuma
- Location of Tokuma Tokuma (Sakha Republic)
- Coordinates: 67°06′N 134°20′E
- Country: Russia
- Federal subject: Sakha Republic
- Administrative district: Verkhoyansky District
- Rural okrugSelsoviet: Borulakhsky Rural Okrug

Population (2010 Census)
  - Total: 140
  - Estimate (2021): 156 (+11.4%)

Municipal status
  - Municipal district: Verkhoyansky Municipal District
  - Rural settlement: Borulakhsky Rural Settlement
- Time zone: UTC+
- Postal code: 678500
- OKTMO ID: 98616414106

Tokuma (Russian: Токума; Yakut: Токума) is a rural locality (a selo) in Borulakhsky Rural Okrug of Verkhoyansky District in the Sakha Republic, Russia, located 99 kilometers (62 mi) from Batagay, the administrative center of the district, and 25 kilometers (16 mi) from Tomtor, the administrative center of the rural okrug. Its population as of the 2010 Census was 140; down from 167 recorded in the 2002 Census.
