= Ulakhan-Kyuyol =

Ulakhan-Kyuyol (Russian: Улахан-Кюёль) may refer to:

- Ulakhan-Kyuyol, Churapchinsky District, Sakha Republic, a selo in Sylansky Rural Okrug, Churapchinsky District, Russia
- Ulakhan-Kyuyol, Verkhoyansky District, Sakha Republic, a selo in Tabalakhsky Rural Okrug, Verkhoyansky District, Russia
- Lake Ulakhan-Kyuyol, in Zhigansky District
