= Sysy-Meyite =

Sysy-Meyite Сысы-Мейите Сыһыы Мэйиитэ (Sakha)
- Selo
- Interactive map of Sysy-Meyite
- Location of Sysy-Meyite Sysy-Meyite (Sakha Republic)
- Coordinates: 66°43′46″N 132°36′05″E
- Country: Russia
- Federal subject: Sakha Republic
- Administrative district: Verkhoyansky District
- Rural okrugSelsoviet: Sartansky Rural Okrug
- Elevation: 128 m (420 ft)

Population (2010 Census)
  - Total: 46
  - Estimate (2021): 25 (−45.7%)

Municipal status
  - Municipal district: Verkhoyansky Municipal District
  - Rural settlement: Sartansky Rural Settlement
- Time zone: UTC+
- Postal code: 678500
- OKTMO ID: 98616442106

Sysy-Meyite (Russian: Сысы-Мейите; Yakut: Сыһыы Мэйиитэ, Sıhıı Meyiite) is a rural locality (a selo), and one of two settlements in Sartansky Rural Okrug of Verkhoyansky District in the Sakha Republic, Russia, in addition to Yunkyur, the administrative center of the Rural Okrug. It is located 322 kilometers (200 mi) from Batagay, the administrative center of the district and 40 kilometers (25 mi) from Yunkyur. Its population as of the 2010 Census was 46; down from 108 recorded in the 2002 Census.
