= Stolby =

Stolby (Russian: Столбы́, "pillars") may refer to:

- Stolby, Verkhoyansky District, Sakha Republic, a rural locality
- Stolby, Namsky District, Sakha Republic, a rural locality
- Stolby Nature Reserve, a rock formation nature reserve in the Krasnoyarsk Krai, Russia
- Lenskiye Stolby, a rock formation by the Lena River
