= Retrogressive thaw slump =

Dynamic feature of thawing permafrost terrain

A retrogressive thaw slump (RTS) is a type of landslide that occurs in the terrestrial permafrost region of the circumpolar Northern Hemisphere when an ice-rich section thaws. RTSs develop quickly and can extend across several hectares (then often called 'megaslump') modifying Arctic coastlines and permafrost terrain. They are the most active and dynamic feature of thermokarst—the collapse of the land surface as ground ice melts. They are thermokarst slope failures due to abrupt thawing of ice-rich permafrost or glaciated terrains. These horseshoe-shaped landslides contribute to the thawing of hectares of permafrost annually and are considered to be one of the most active and dynamic features of thermokarst. They are found in permafrost or glaciated regions of the Northern Hemisphere—the Tibetan Plateau, Siberia, from the Himalayas to northern Greenland, and in northern Canada's Northwest Territories (NWT), the Yukon Territories, Nunavut, and Nunavik and in the American state of Alaska. The largest RTS in the world is in Siberia—the Batagaika Crater, also called a "megaslump"—is one kilometre long and 100 metres (330 ft) deep and it grows a 100 feet (30 m) annually. The land began to sink, and the Batagaika Crater began to form in the 1960s, following clear-cutting of a section of forested area.

== Development and formation ==
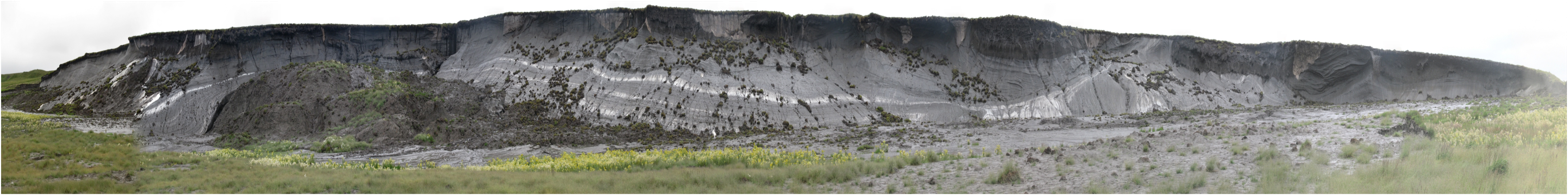
"Several types of massive ground ice, including ice wedges and intrasedimental ice, observable within the cliff wall of a retrogressive thaw slump located on the southern coast of Herschel Island. This exposure has a headwall that measures in excess of 22 m high and is over 1.3 km long. This cliff exposure has been increasing in size on a yearly basis since it was first measured in 1950 from air photographs".

As ice-rich permafrost and glacial terrain thaws, the melting ground ice causes the land surface to collapse through a series of processes resulting in the formation of an irregular land surface, called thermokarst, composed of hummocks and hollows.

Retrogressive thaw slumps are the "most active geomorphic features of thermokarst permafrost terrain". Permafrost dates back hundreds of thousands of years; thermokarst and its features—such as retrogressive thaw slumps—which are slope failures, have been initiated by terrain disturbance associated with clear-cutting forests, the construction of seismic lines and roads.

The retrogressive thaw slump forms on massive ice or ice-rich permafrost, which is often covered in a layer of tundra vegetation under which a layer of peat may lie. The RTS surface is convex and is located on the shoulder of the hillslope.

The most thawing occurs on south- and west-facing slopes. Ballantyne describes how, as scarp ice thaws it causes rapidly evolving retrogressive slope failure or slumping. This landslide "exposes a fresh face" of ice-rich permafrost. As thawing takes place, the ice-rich, steep, erosional headscarp retreats as it collapses. An active layer of basal sediment accumulates flowing down a low-gradient slump floor. This flows downslope as it "collapses to the base of the exposure". The floor or base of the retrogressive thaw slump is covered in then sediment—mudflows and braided hills. As the headscarp progressively retreats, the slump floor extends.

As the slopes thaw, the ice-rich permafrost is exposed and turns into a mud slurry. "Thermokarst processes may cause lakes to enlarge, peatlands to collapse and landslides or thaw slumps to develop." (Note: "The term thermokarst describes the processes and landforms that involve collapse of the land surface as a result of the melting of ground ice." Kokelj & Jorgenson 2013) "Retrogressive thaw slumps are among the most active geomorphological features in permafrost terrain."

A 2009 study classified slumps as active, stable, and ancient. An active slump is one that has a clearly defined headwall and bare areas; and a stable slump is one that has clearly defined boundaries and is completely covered in vegetation. The headwall relief of an ancient slump is a subdued scar on the terrain that is covered in tundra vegetation.

== Geomorphic terminology ==
RTS morphology comprises a vertical headwall, an inclined headscarp, a floor filled with flow deposits, and a lobe that conveys thawed sediments downslope. RTS morphology comprises the headwall, headscarp; a floor, and a lobe. The vertical headwall is steep and ice-rich; the downsloped headscarp is a "low-angled scar zone" composed of thawed slurry; the lobe is a tongue of debris in active slumps which is composed of saturated materials that flowed downslope.

Retrogressive thaw slumps are slope failures due to abrupt thawing of ice-rich permafrost. They have also been called ground-ice slumps, thermocirques, tundra mudflows, retrogressive flow slides, and bi-modal flows. These terms are no longer recommended by the National Snow and Ice Data Center (NSIDC).

Yedoma are deposits of highly organic-rich and ice-rich permafrost with ice content representing from 50 to 90% of its volume. Much of the yedoma deposits have been frozen since 10,000 years ago, in the Pleistocene age. As of 2011, the Yedoma domain covered 1,000,000 square kilometres (390,000 mi^{2}; 100,000,000 ha; 250,000,000 acres) of the northern permafrost zone, mostly in Siberia, including northern Yakutia, and also in Alaska, and in the north of Canada, including the Yukon Territories. (Note: The National Snow and Ice Data Center (NSIDC) defines yedoma as a "type of Pleistocene-age (formed 1.8 million to 10,000 years before present) permafrost that contains a significant amount of organic material with ice content of 50 to 90 percent by volume. Thawing yedoma is a significant source of atmospheric methane.")

A retrogressive thaw slump is a slow landslide caused by thawing yedoma. Because yedoma deposits are ice-rich, they are "especially prone to rapid-thaw processes" and "highly vulnerable to disturbances such as thermokarst and thermo-erosion processes". (Note: A geological slump is a common form of mass wasting, when a mass of material moves downward along a curved surface, usually neither fast of very far. The surface of the rupture is spoon-shaped and concave upward or outward. The slump creates a crescent-shaped scarp at the head and the block's upper surface is tilted backwards. When the slope is over-steeped, a slump commonly occurs. A slump can occur when the river edge becomes over-steeped or on a coastal cliff undercut by wave action."(Tarbuck and Lutgens 1999))

According to the definition of the Multi-Language Glossary of Permafrost and Related Ground-Ice Terms compiled by the International Permafrost Association (IPA)'s Terminology Working Group, "retrogressive thaw slumps consist of a steep headwall that retreats in a retrogressive fashion due to thawing, and a debris flow formed by the mixture of thawed sediment and meltwater that slides down the face of the headwall and flows away."

== Geographic distribution ==
Retrogressive thaw slumps are forms of the permafrost or glaciated regions and may be found in the Northern Hemisphere and the Tibetan Plateau, from the Himalayas to northern Greenland, in northern Canada and Alaska. RTSs "are commonly found on the banks of northern rivers and lakes and along the arctic coast, especially where undercutting is active."

=== Alaska ===
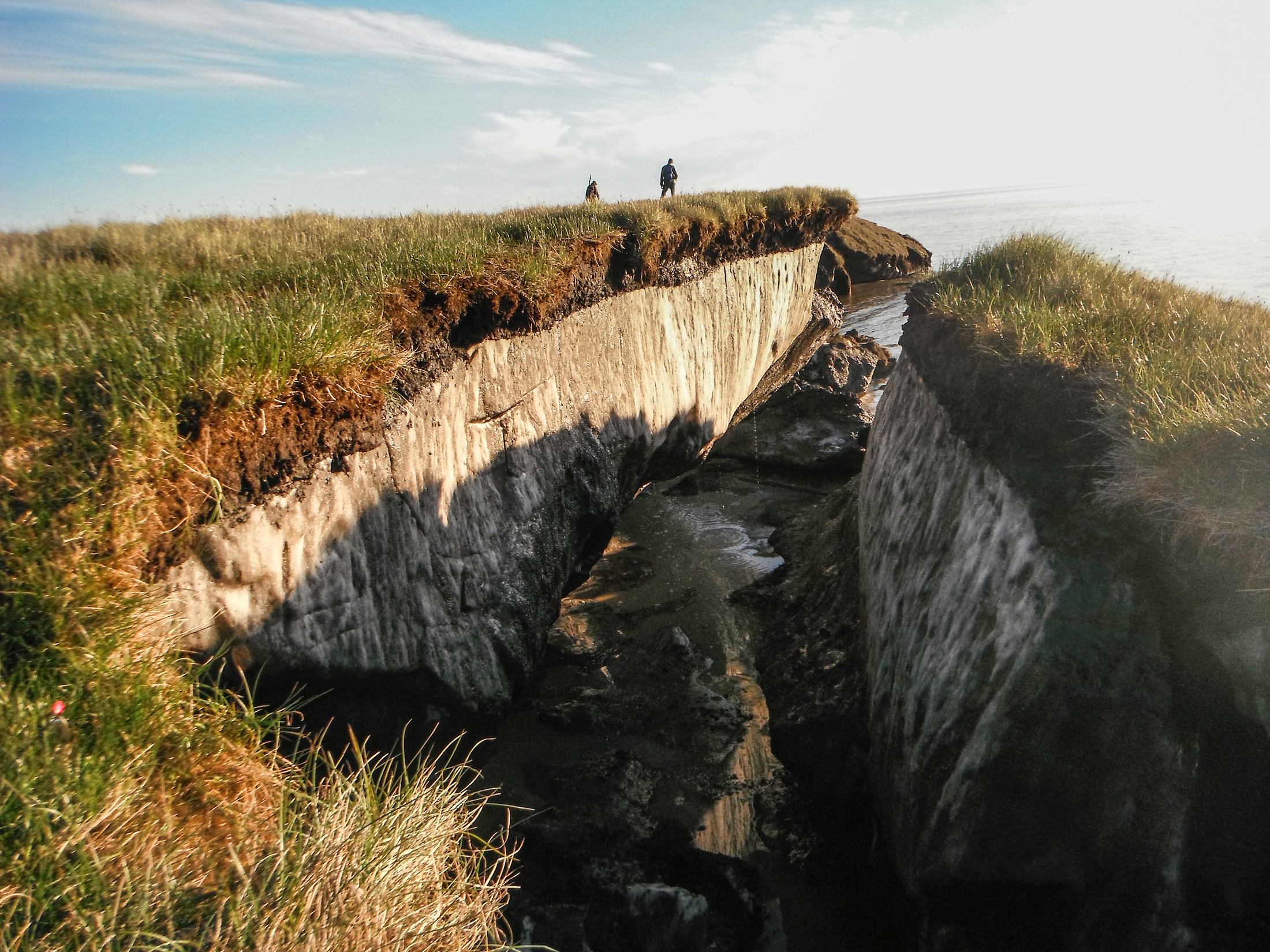
Arctic Coastal Plain, Teshekpuk Lake, Alaska by Brandt Meixell, USGS

=== Canada ===
There are thousands of RTSs have been inventoried in the north of Canada. There were 212 RTS, varying in size "from 0.4 to 52 ha, with 10 slumps exceeding 20 ha", identified in the westward extent of the Laurentide Ice Sheet in northwestern Canada's Richardson Mountains and Peel Plateau region—of these "189 have been active since at least 1985". These thaw slumps affect permafrost terrain in northwestern Canada, where thousands of them have been identified.

Multi-year studies have mapped and monitored of RTSs in the Mackenzie River Delta since 1950. Researchers found a "significantly higher growth rates" of RTSs from 1973 to 2004 than from 1950 to 1973, which suggested that a "regional driver of slump growth has subsumed site specific controls."

Recent landslides into Lake Tiktalik in the Western Arctic have created large thaw slumps—measuring several hundred feet in both width and depth—indicating the rapid degradation of permafrost. According to New York Times, these thaw slumps "are the most dramatic evidence of a phenomenon that could turn the local Inuvialuit into Canada's first climate refugees." The residents of Tuktoyaktuk—a hamlet near the thaw slump—are faced with losing their homes as the hamlet sinks into the permafrost.

=== China ===
Across the Tibetan Plateau—also known as the Qinghai–Tibet Plateau (QTP)—the 632 kilometres (393 mi)-long narrow engineering corridor on permafrost—the Qinghai-Tibet Engineering Corridor— links Lhasa in inland China to the Golmud in the Tibet Autonomous Region. A 2022 inventory identified 875 widely distributed RTSs, along the highly developed corridor with significant infrastructures, including the Qinghai–Tibet Railway and the Qinghai–Tibet Highway, "as well as power and communication towers".

=== Russia ===
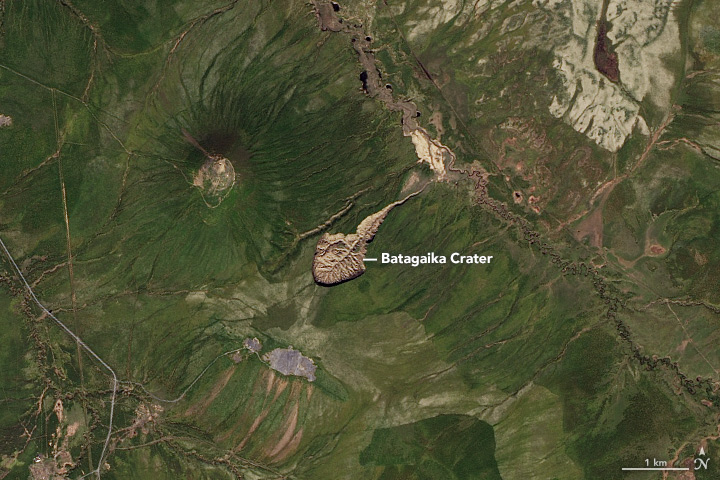
Batagaika Crater

Two-thirds of Russia's territory consists of permafrost terrain, which represents the largest share in the world. It is in central Yakutia in the East Siberian taiga in Verkhoyansky District of the Sakha Republic that the world's largest retrogressive thaw slump, the Batagaika Crater, is located. Because of its massive size—it is 1 km (0.62 mi) long and 100 metres (330 ft) deep and growing annually—the Batagaika Crater has been called a "megaslump"—a large retrogressive thaw slump. The crater is a feature of a thermokarst depression; in contrast to other thermokarst depressions in permafrost terrain—including those found in the north of Canada—the Batagaika Crater is much deeper, from "two-to-three times deeper".

In 2016, Professor Julian Murton of the University of Sussex led an expedition to undertake a pilot study of the Batagaika Crater—"one of the 'most important' sites in the world for the study of permafrost". The local residents living near the crater refer to it as a "gateway to Hell". The Yakutian people believe that the crater is the door way to under world, one of three worlds, which include the upper and middle worlds.

The bottom layer of permafrost sediment has been estimated to be "at least six hundred and fifty thousand years old", based on luminescence dating of drill bores extracted by Murton and his team. Murton said that this means that the permafrost "survived the previous interglacial period, which began some hundred and thirty thousand years ago ... The oldest permafrost in Eurasia has been kicking around for over half a million years ... Seeing as it survived intense global-warming events in the past, it must be pretty resilient."

While permafrost is resilient, it is not invulnerable. Batagaika Crater began to form in the 1960s, following clear-cutting of a large forested area. It has been growing 100 feet (30 m) a year since then. In 2008, there was major flooding in the area which accelerated to growth of the depression.

In 2016 and 2017, a group of researchers studied retrogressive thaw slumps in Northeast Siberia: one at Kurungnakh Island in the Lena River Delta and the second in Duvanny Yar near the Kolyma River. In 2018, an international team of scientists, found a nematode in a Pleistocene squirrel burrow in the Duvanny Yar outcrop that was estimated to be about 32,000 years old. The scientists thawed the nematodes; it revived and began moving and eating, making it one of the oldest living multicellular animals on Earth.

=== Mongolia ===
There is a pingo retrogressive thaw slump in the Akkol Valley, one of three U-shaped valleys—including Taldura and Karaoyuk—that comprise the Altai Mountains South Chuyskiy Range in Mongolia. During the Holocene, these three valleys were occupied by ice at various times. The Akkol valley permafrost-indicator features include rock glaciers, pingos.

== Climate change ==
As the climate warms, "terrain-altering thermokarst" retrogressive thaw slumps represent the "most rapid and dramatic changes" in permafrost regions.

Permafrost in the Northern Hemisphere, which covered approximately 23,000,000 square kilometres (8,900,000 mi^{2}; 2.3×10^{9} ha; 5.7×10^{9} acres), representing 24% of the terrestrial area, as of 1997 is vulnerable to climate warming. Of the estimated 950 billion tonnes of carbon in permafrost, the yedoma domain stores just a little less than 50% of this carbon.

RTS "represent a particularly dramatic landscape response that is expected to intensify in magnitude and frequency with future climate change." They "contribute large volumes of materials downslope to lakes, drainage networks and coastal zones."

Retrogressive thaw slumps development is one result of global warming as Arctic temperatures rise rapidly and permafrost thaws. For this reason, permafrost environments are extremely vulnerable to climate change in the Arctic. (Note: "Radiocarbon dating showed that RTS were likely to have been active around 300 a BP and are undergoing a similar period of increased activity now." (Lantuit et al 2012)) (Note: "The warmer and wetter northern climate during recent decades has led to increased thermokarst activity in permafrost terrain."(Armstrong et al 2018, Kokelj & Jorgenson 2013) (Note: "Our observation that the most rapid intensification of slump activity occurred in the coldest environment (the Jesse Moraine on Banks Island) indicates that ice-cored landscapes in cold permafrost environments are highly vulnerable to climate change". Segal, Lantz & Kokelj 2016)

== Impact ==
RSTs thaw "hectares of permafrost annually." RTSs "typically retreat and expand at high rates". RTSs damage "infrastructure, and releas[e] carbon preserved in frozen ground."

=== Modification of streams and rivers ===
Thaw slumps "have been shown to modify the discharge of streams and rivers (Kokelj et al. 2013) and the geochemical composition and sediment loads of streams and lakes" (Kokelj et al. 2009; Malone et al. 2013; Rudy et al. 2017; Tanski et al. 2017)

"This has negatively affected aquatic ecosystems, including benthic macroinvertebrates communities" (Chin et al. 2016).

=== Potential consequences ===
Retrogressive thaw slumps threaten Canada's infrastructure and contributes to mercury contamination in the water.

in the western Canadian Arctic, Inuvialuit residents of the hamlet of Sachs Harbour, Banks Island reported seeing an increase in the number of slumps, which had affected "travel for traditional hunting and fishing activities."

== RTS monitoring ==
"Advances in remote sensing techniques, and their application in a broad suite of change detection studies, indicate recent increases in the rates and magnitude of thermokarst including retrogressive thaw slumping, lake expansion and the transformation of frozen peatlands to collapsed wetlands."

In Canada, computerized alert systems are being installed to monitor humidity, temperature and other factors at RTSs that threaten infrastructure, such as the Alaska Highway. One of the first of these alert systems includes several in northern Quebec and one at the Takhini Slump. There are plans in place to set up systems along the Dempster Highway, in the Yukon Territories and the Northwest Territories. The Takhini Slump, located 30 kilometres (30,000 m) north of Whitehorse is "thawing at faster rates than ever before", according to Fabrice Calmels and his research team who came to the area in 2019, when the Takhini Slump was 95 metres (312 ft) from the Alaska Highway; in 2021 it was 40 metres (130 ft) away.

A 2022 Earth System Science Data report described the implementation of a number of sensors and integrated observation dataset used to monitor the RSSs "hydrological and thermal deformation" to mitigate infrastructure damage to the Qinghai-Tibet Engineering Corridor engineering projects.

== Mitigation ==
"[I]ncreased knowledge on the dynamics of thaw slump activity is required to better characterize their impact on the environment." According to a 1990 study, woodchip insulation on ice-rich slopes were used to slow down slumping along the "pipeline route from Norman Wells, NWT, to Zama, Alberta."

== Sources ==
- Armstrong, Lindsay; Lacelle, Denis; Fraser, Robert H.; Kokelj, Steve; Knudby, Anders (6 September 2018). "Thaw slump activity measured using stationary cameras in time-lapse and Structure-from-Motion photogrammetry". Arctic Science. 4 (4): 827–845. doi:10.1139/as-2018-0016. hdl:1807/91076. S2CID 133652386.
- Ballantyne, Colin K. (16 January 2018). Periglacial Geomorphology. John Wiley & Sons. ISBN 978-1-4051-0006-9.
- Bernhard, Philipp; Zwieback, Simon; Hajnsek, Irena (July 2021). "Area and volume quantification of Arctic thaw slumps using time-series of digital elevation models". 2021 IEEE International Geoscience and Remote Sensing Symposium IGARSS. 2021 IEEE International Geoscience and Remote Sensing Symposium IGARSS. pp. 800–803. doi:10.1109/IGARSS47720.2021.9554503.
- Bliss, L. C.; Wein, Ross (January 1971). "Plant community responses to disturbances in the western Canadian Arctic". Canadian Journal of Botany. 50 (5): 1097–1109. doi:10.1139/b72-136.
- Brown, J.; Ferrians, O.J. Jr.; Heginbottom, J.A.; Melnikov, E.S. (1997). Circum-Arctic map of permafrost and ground ice conditions (PDF) (Report). Circum-Pacific map series CP-45. Cartography by F.J. Sidlauskas, Jr. and G.F. Delinski, Jr. Washington, DC: U.S. Geological Survey in Cooperation with the Circum-Pacific Council for Energy and Mineral Resources. doi:10.13140/RG.2.1.2994.9040. ISBN 978-0-607-88745-7.
- Burn, C.R.; Friele, P.A. (1 January 1989). "Geomorphology, Vegetation Succession, Soil Characteristics and Permafrost in Retrogressive Thaw Slumps near Mayo, Yukon Territory". Arctic. 42 (1): 31–40. doi:10.14430/arctic1637. ISSN 1923-1245.
- Burn, C. R.; Lewkowicz, A. G. (1990). "Canadian Landform Examples - 17 Retrogressive Thaw Slumps". The Canadian Geographer. 34 (3): 273–276. Bibcode:1990CGeog..34..273B. doi:10.1111/j.1541-0064.1990.tb01092.x. ISSN 1541-0064.
- Cheng, Guodong; Wu, Tonghua (8 June 2007). "Responses of permafrost to climate change and their environmental significance, Qinghai-Tibet Plateau". Journal of Geophysical Research. 112 (F2): F02S03. Bibcode:2007JGRF..112.2S03C. CiteSeerX 10.1.1.730.9627. doi:10.1029/2006JF000631. ISSN 0148-0227.
- Ci, Zhijia; Peng, Fei; Xue, Xian; Zhang, Xiaoshan (2020). "Permafrost Thaw Dominates Mercury Emission in Tibetan Thermokarst Ponds". Environmental Science & Technology. 54 (9): 5456–5466. Bibcode:2020EnST...54.5456C. doi:10.1021/acs.est.9b06712. PMID 32294379. S2CID 215793015.
- Colucci, Renato R. (2 October 2021). "In Siberia, Giant Craters Sparked Dozens of Wild Theories About their Origins. Thawing Permafrost has Shaped the Largest of its Kind, The Batagaika Crater". Severe Weather Europe.
- Czudek, Tadeáš; Demek, Jaromír (1 September 1970). "Thermokarst in Siberia and its influence on the development of lowland relief". Quaternary Research. 1 (1): 103–120. Bibcode:1970QuRes...1..103C. doi:10.1016/0033-5894(70)90013-X. ISSN 0033-5894. S2CID 140683660.
- Desmarais, Anna (6 October 2021). "Researchers set up permafrost thaw alert system on major highway connecting Yukon and Alaska". CBC News.
- Environment and Natural Resources (2014). Permafrost (Information) (Report). NWT State of the Environment Report.
- Everdingen, R.V., ed. (2002) [1998]. Multi-language glossary of permafrost and related ground-ice terms (PDF). Boulder, CO: National Snow and Ice Data Center and World Data Center for Glaciology. OCLC 49707110. Archived (PDF) from the original on 15 May 2024 – via geocryology.com.
- Fish and Wildlife Compensation Program (June 2018). Williston-Dinosaur Watershed Fish Mercury Investigation: 2017 Report (PDF) (Report). Peace Region.
- Fukui, Kotaro; Fujii, Yoshiyuki; Mikhailov, Nikolai; Ostanin, Oleg; Iwahana, Go (1 April 2007). "The lower limit of mountain permafrost in the Russian Altai Mountains". Permafrost and Periglacial Processes. 18 (2): 129–136. Bibcode:2007PPPr...18..129F. doi:10.1002/ppp.585. S2CID 140152166.
- Grosse, Guido; Harden, Jennifer; Turetsky, Merritt; McGuire, A. David; Camill, Philip; Tarnocai, Charles; Frolking, Steve; Schuur, Edward A. G.; Jorgenson, Torre; Marchenko, Sergei; Romanovsky, Vladimir; Wickland, Kimberly P.; French, Nancy; Waldrop, Mark; Bourgeau-Chavez, Laura; Striegl, Robert G. (2011). "Vulnerability of high-latitude soil organic carbon in North America to disturbance". Journal of Geophysical Research: Biogeosciences. 116 (G4). Bibcode:2011JGRG..116.0K06G. doi:10.1029/2010JG001507. ISSN 2156-2202.
- Hughes, O.L. (1972). Surficial geology and land classification, Mackenzie Valley Transportation Corridor. Proceedings of the Canadian North Pipeline Research Conference. N.R.C.C. Technical Memo. No. 104. Ottawa, Canada. pp. 17–24.
- Kokelj, S. V.; Jorgenson, M. T. (2013). "Advances in Thermokarst Research". Permafrost and Periglacial Processes. 24 (2): 108–119. Bibcode:2013PPPr...24..108K. doi:10.1002/ppp.1779. ISSN 1099-1530. S2CID 140683397.
- Kokelj, S. V.; Lantz, T. C.; Kanigan, J.; Smith, S. L.; Coutts, R. (April 2009). "Origin and polycyclic behaviour of tundra thaw slumps, Mackenzie Delta region, Northwest Territories, Canada". Permafrost and Periglacial Processes. 20 (2): 173–184. Bibcode:2009PPPr...20..173K. doi:10.1002/ppp.642. ISSN 1045-6740. S2CID 128734852.
- Lacelle, Denis; Brooker, Alex; Fraser, Robert H.; Kokelj, Steve V. (April 2015). "Distribution and growth of thaw slumps in the Richardson Mountains–Peel Plateau region, northwestern Canada". Geomorphology. 235: 40–51. Bibcode:2015Geomo.235...40L. doi:10.1016/j.geomorph.2015.01.024. ISSN 0169-555X.
- Lambert, J. D. H. (1 January 1972). "Plant Succession on Tundra Mudflows: Preliminary Observations". Arctic. 25 (2): 99–106. doi:10.14430/arctic2949. ISSN 1923-1245.
- Lamothe, C.; St. Onge, D. (1961). "A note on a periglacial erosional process in the Isachsen Area, NWT". Geographical Bulletin (16): 104–113. ISSN 0435-3765.
- Lantz, Trevor C.; Kokelj, Steven V. (21 March 2008). "Increasing rates of retrogressive thaw slump activity in the Mackenzie Delta region, N.W.T., Canada". Geophysical Research Letters. 35 (6): –06502. Bibcode:2008GeoRL..35.6502L. doi:10.1029/2007GL032433. ISSN 0094-8276. S2CID 140177946.
- Lantuit, H.; Pollard, W. H.; Couture, N.; Fritz, M.; Schirrmeister, L.; Meyer, H.; Hubberten, H.-W. (2012). "Modern and Late Holocene Retrogressive Thaw Slump Activity on the Yukon Coastal Plain and Herschel Island, Yukon Territory, Canada". Permafrost and Periglacial Processes. 23 (1): 39–51. Bibcode:2012PPPr...23...39L. doi:10.1002/ppp.1731. ISSN 1099-1530. S2CID 129748972.
- Lewkowicz, Antoni (29 April 2019). "A Remarkable Response of Ice-Rich Permafrost Terrain to Summer Warming" (Text). Arctic Research Consortium of the United States (ARCUS).
- Luo, Lihui; Zhuang, Yanli; Zhang, Mingyi; Zhang, Zhongqiong; Ma, Wei; Zhao, Wenzhi; Zhao, Lin; Wang, Li; Shi, Yanmei; Zhang, Ze; Duan, Quntao; Tian, Deyu; Zhou, Qingguo (20 August 2021). "An integrated observation dataset of the hydrological and thermal deformation in permafrost slopes and engineering infrastructure in the Qinghai–Tibet Engineering Corridor". Earth System Science Data. 13 (8): 4035–4052. Bibcode:2021ESSD...13.4035L. doi:10.5194/essd-13-4035-2021. ISSN 1866-3508. S2CID 237420304.
- MacKay, J.R. (1966). "Segregated epigenetic ice and slumps in permafrost, Mackenzie Delta area, N.W.T.". Geographical Bulletin. 1 (8): 59–80.
- Mascarelli, Amanda (April 2009). "A sleeping giant?". Nature Climate Change. 1 (904): 46–49. Bibcode:2009NatCC...1...46M. doi:10.1038/climate.2009.24. ISSN 1758-6798.
- McKinley, Steve (20 November 2021). "This little-known climate change hazard is creeping across northern Canada. These scientists are trying to fight it". The Star. Archived from the original on 20 November 2021.
- McRoberts, E.C.; Morgenstern, N.R. (1973). Landslides in the Vicinity of the Mackenzie River, Mile 205 to 660. Department of Indian and Northern Affairs Canada (Report). Environmental Social Program, Northern Pipelines. Ottawa. p. 96.
- Meissner, Dirk (12 May 2015). "West Moberly First Nations concerned about mercury contamination in fish". CBC News. The Canadian Press.
- Ramage, Justine L.; Irrgang, Anna M.; Herzschuh, Ulrike; Morgenstern, Anne; Couture, Nicole; Lantuit, Hugues (2017). "Terrain controls on the occurrence of coastal retrogressive thaw slumps along the Yukon Coast, Canada". Journal of Geophysical Research: Earth Surface. 122 (9): 1619–1634. Bibcode:2017JGRF..122.1619R. doi:10.1002/2017JF004231. ISSN 2169-9011. S2CID 133616008.
- Riedlinger, D.; Berkes, F. (2001). "Contributions of traditional knowledge to understanding climate change in the Canadian Arctic". Polar Record. 37 (37): 315–328. Bibcode:2001PoRec..37..315R. doi:10.1017/S0032247400017058. S2CID 129367192.
- Schuster, Paul; Schaefer, Kevin; Aiken, George; Antweiler, Ronald; Dewild, John; et al. (2018). "Permafrost Stores a Globally Significant Amount of Mercury". Geophysical Research Letters. 45 (3): 1463–1471. Bibcode:2018GeoRL..45.1463S. doi:10.1002/2017GL075571.
- Schuur, Edward A. G.; Abbott, Benjamin (30 November 2011). "High risk of permafrost thaw". Nature. 480 (7375): 32–33. doi:10.1038/480032a. ISSN 0028-0836. PMID 22129707. S2CID 4412175.
- Segal, Rebecca A; Lantz, Trevor C; Kokelj, Steven V (1 March 2016). "Acceleration of thaw slump activity in glaciated landscapes of the Western Canadian Arctic". Environmental Research Letters. 11 (3) 034025. Bibcode:2016ERL....11c4025S. doi:10.1088/1748-9326/11/3/034025. ISSN 1748-9326. S2CID 131105233.
- Shatilovich, A. V.; Tchesunov, A. V.; Neretina, T. V.; Grabarnik, I. P.; Gubin, S. V.; Vishnivetskaya, T. A.; Onstott, T. C.; Rivkina, E. M. (1 May 2018). "Viable Nematodes from Late Pleistocene Permafrost of the Kolyma River Lowland". Doklady Biological Sciences. 480 (1): 100–102. doi:10.1134/S0012496618030079. ISSN 1608-3105. PMID 30009350. S2CID 49743808.
- Strauss, Jens; Schirrmeister, Lutz; Grosse, Guido; Fortier, Daniel; Hugelius, Gustaf; Knoblauch, Christian; Romanovsky, Vladimir; Schädel, Christina; Schneider von Deimling, Thomas; Schuur, Edward A. G.; Shmelev, Denis; Ulrich, Mathias; Veremeeva, Alexandra (1 January 2017). "Deep Yedoma permafrost: A synthesis of depositional characteristics and carbon vulnerability". Earth-Science Reviews. 172: 75–86. Bibcode:2017ESRv..172...75S. doi:10.1016/j.earscirev.2017.07.007. hdl:21.11116/0000-0003-3BCF-3. ISSN 0012-8252.
- Struzik, Ed (21 January 2020). "How thawing permafrost is beginning to transform the Arctic". Arctic Focus.
- St. Pierre, Kyra; Zolkos, Scott; Shakil, Sarah; Tank, Suzanne; St. Louis, Vincent; Kokelj, Steve (2018). "Unprecedented Increases in Total and Methyl Mercury Concentrations Downstream of Retrogressive Thaw Slumps in the Western Canadian Arctic". Environmental Science & Technology. 52 (24): 14099–14109. Bibcode:2018EnST...5214099S. doi:10.1021/acs.est.8b05348. PMID 30474969. S2CID 53745081.
- Tarbuck, Edward J.; Lutgens, Frederick K. (1999). Earth: an introduction to physical geology. Upper Saddle River, N.J. : Prentice Hall. ISBN 978-0-13-796129-0.
- "200,000 year old soil found at mysterious crater, a 'gate to the subterranean world'". The Siberian Times. 18 May 2016.
- "Worms frozen in permafrost for up to 42,000 years come back to life". The Siberian Times.
- Turner, Kevin W.; Pearce, Michelle D.; Hughes, Daniel D. (January 2021). "Detailed Characterization and Monitoring of a Retrogressive Thaw Slump from Remotely Piloted Aircraft Systems and Identifying Associated Influence on Carbon and Nitrogen Export". Remote Sensing. 13 (2): 171. Bibcode:2021RemS...13..171T. doi:10.3390/rs13020171.
- Walter, KM; Zimov, SA; Chanton, JP; Verbyla, D; Chapin, FS (September 2006). "Methane bubbling from Siberian thaw lakes as a positive feedback to climate warming". Nature. 443 (7107): 71–5. Bibcode:2006Natur.443...71W. doi:10.1038/nature05040. PMID 16957728. S2CID 4415304.
- Wang, Kang; Jafarov, Elchin; Overeem, Irina; Romanovsky, Vladimir; Schaefer, Kevin; Clow, Gary; Urban, Frank; Cable, William; Piper, Mark; Schwalm, Christopher; Zhang, Tingjun; Kholodov, Alexander; Sousanes, Pamela; Loso, Michael; Hill, Kenneth (21 December 2018). "A synthesis dataset of permafrost-affected soil thermal conditions for Alaska, USA". Earth System Science Data. 10 (4): 2311–2328. Bibcode:2018ESSD...10.2311W. doi:10.5194/essd-10-2311-2018. ISSN 1866-3508. S2CID 203111980.
- Xia, Zhuoxuan; Huang, Lingcao; Fan, Chengyan; Jia, Shichao; Lin, Zhanjun; Liu, Lin; Luo, Jing; Niu, Fujun; Zhang, Tingjun (14 January 2022). "Retrogressive thaw slumps along the Qinghai-Tibet Engineering Corridor: a comprehensive inventory and their distribution characteristics". Earth System Science Data Discussions. Cryosphere – Permafrost: 1–19. doi:10.5194/essd-2021-439. S2CID 245977516.
- Yaffa, Joshua (10 January 2022). "The Great Siberian Thaw". The New Yorker.
- Zhang, T.; Barry, R. G.; Knowles, K.; Heginbottom, J. A.; Brown, J. (1 April 1999). "Statistics and characteristics of permafrost and ground-ice distribution in the Northern Hemisphere". Polar Geography. 23 (2): 132–154. Bibcode:1999PolGe..23..132Z. doi:10.1080/10889379909377670. ISSN 1088-937X.
