= Ese-Khayya =

Ese-Khayya Эсэ-Хайя Эһэ Хайа (Yakut)
- Urban-type settlement
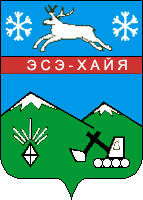
- Coat of arms
- Interactive map of Ese-Khayya
- Location of Ese-Khayya Ese-Khayya (Sakha Republic)
- Coordinates: 67°33′N 134°38′E
- Country: Russia
- Federal subject: Sakha Republic
- Administrative district: Verkhoyansky District
- SettlementSelsoviet: Settlement of Ese-Khayya
- Founded: 1938
- Urban-type settlement status since: 1940

Population (2010 Census)
  - Total: 239
  - Estimate (2023): 156 (−34.7%)

Administrative status
  - Capital of: Settlement of Ese-Khayya

Municipal status
  - Municipal district: Verkhoyansky Municipal District
  - Urban settlement: Ese-Khayya Urban Settlement
  - Capital of: Ese-Khayya Urban Settlement
- Time zone: UTC+
- Postal code: 678515
- OKTMO ID: 98616156051

Ese-Khayya population
- 2010 Census: 239
- 2002 Census: 343
- 1989 Census: 1,530
- 1979 Census: 1,347

Ese-Khayya (Russian: Эсэ-Хайя; Yakut: Эһэ Хайа, Ehe Xaya) is an urban locality (an urban-type settlement) in Verkhoyansky District of the Sakha Republic, Russia, located 20 kilometers (12 mi) from Batagay, the administrative center of the district. As of the 2010 Census, its population was 239.

== Geography ==
Ynnakh Mountain is a granite massif located a few miles to the southeast of Ese-Khayya. The Batagaika crater is also located nearby to the northeast.

== History ==
Urban-type settlement status was granted to Ese-Khayya in 1940.

== Administrative and municipal status ==
Within the framework of administrative divisions, the urban-type settlement of Ese-Khayya is incorporated within Verkhoyansky District as the Settlement of Ese-Khayya. As a municipal division, the Settlement of Ese-Khayya is incorporated within Verkhoyansky Municipal District as Ese-Khayya Urban Settlement.
