= Tala, Russia =

Tala Тала Таала (Sakha)
- Selo
- Interactive map of Tala
- Location of Tala Tala (Sakha Republic)
- Coordinates: 67°39′21″N 136°24′35″E
- Country: Russia
- Federal subject: Sakha Republic
- Administrative district: Verkhoyansky District
- Rural okrugSelsoviet: Tabalakhsky Rural Okrug

Population (2010 Census)
  - Total: 1
  - Estimate (2021): 0 (−100%)

Municipal status
  - Municipal district: Verkhoyansky Municipal District
  - Rural settlement: Tabalakhsky Rural Settlement
- Time zone: UTC+
- Postal code: 678504
- OKTMO ID: 98616453106

Tala (Russian: Тала; Yakut: Таала, Taala) is a rural locality (a selo), and one of two settlements in Babushkinsky Rural Okrug of Verkhoyansky District in the Sakha Republic, Russia, in addition to Ulakhan-Kyuyol, the administrative center of the Rural Okrug. It is located 126 kilometers (78 mi) from Batagay, the administrative center of the district and 10 kilometers (6.2 mi) from Ulakhan Kyuyol. Its population as of the 2010 Census was 1; up from 0 recorded in the 2002 Census.
