= Osokhtokh =

Osokhtokh Осохтох Оһохтоох (Sakha)
- Selo
- Interactive map of Osokhtokh
- Location of Osokhtokh Osokhtokh (Sakha Republic)
- Coordinates: 69°08′N 134°19′E
- Country: Russia
- Federal subject: Sakha Republic
- Administrative district: Verkhoyansky District
- Rural okrugSelsoviet: Eginsky Rural Okrug

Population (2010 Census)
  - Total: 140
  - Estimate (2021): 110 (−21.4%)

Municipal status
  - Municipal district: Verkhoyansky Municipal District
  - Rural settlement: Eginsky Rural Settlement
- Time zone: UTC+
- Postal code: 678500
- OKTMO ID: 98616464106

Osokhtokh (Russian: Осохтох; Yakut: Оһохтоох, Ohoxtoox) is a rural locality (a selo) in Eginsky Rural Okrug of Verkhoyansky District in the Sakha Republic, Russia, located 283 kilometers (176 mi) from Batagay, the administrative center of the district, and 90 kilometers (56 mi) from Saydy, the administrative center of the rural okrug. Its population as of the 2010 Census was 140, down from 148 recorded during the 2002 Census.

== Geography ==
The village is located north of the Arctic Circle, by the Baky river.
