= Equus lenensis =

Equus lenensis Temporal range: Late Pleistocene–Holocene (until 3000 BC)

Scientific classification
- Kingdom: Animalia
- Phylum: Chordata
- Class: Mammalia
- Order: Perissodactyla
- Family: Equidae
- Genus: Equus
- Species: †E. lenensis

Binomial name
- †Equus lenensis Russanov, 1968

Extinct species of horse native to Siberia

Equus lenensis, commonly known as the Lena horse, is an extinct species of horse from the Late Pleistocene and Holocene (until around 5,000 years ago / 3000 BC) of Siberia. Some sources have considered it a subspecies of the wild horse. The species is known from several preserved frozen specimens.

== Distribution and discoveries ==
Specimens of Equus lenensis are primarily known from the northernmost part of Siberia, above the 60th parallel north, though genetic evidence indicates that the lineage was present as far south as the foothills of the Altai mountains.

The species is known from several frozen mummies found in northeast Siberia, including: a pregnant 4–5 year old female (the Indigirka/'Sana" mummy), discovered in 1953 during a gold mining operation in the upper Indigirka River basin, around 41,000 years old with a preserved foetus; a 7–8 year old adult male (the Selerikan mummy), also found in a goldmine in the upper Indigirka River basin in 1968, which is around 42,000 years old, missing the head and one of the hind limbs, which preserves some of the internal organs; ; a 4.5 year old filly (the Dukarsk Horse) discovered in 1981 near Dukarskoe Lake in the vicinity of the lower Indigirka River, estimated to be around 29,500 years old, and a 1.5 year old yearling (the Bilibino Horse), over 58,000 years old discovered in 2004–2005 in the vicinity of Bilibino village in Chukotka. Another specimen from the mid-Holocene (around 4630 ± 35 years Before Present) called the "Yukagir horse" was found in the far north of Yakutia in 2010. Another Lena horse mummy discovery was in Batagaika crater in Yakutia, in 2018, which was preserved almost completely intact, and with liquid blood within its preserved veins. The specimen was hypothesized to be about two months old when it died. A young male, it is estimated to be around 43,400 years old.

== Description ==
Remains attributed to the species display a considerable range of morphological variability. The species had a small body size, with adult individuals estimated to have a body mass of around 300–365 kilograms (661–805 lb), with the mummy of an 8 year old adult male horse (the Selerikan mummy) having a height of 1.35 metres (4 ft 5 in) at the withers. The body proportions are comparable to those of living Przewalski's horses and the living domestic Yakutian horse breed, with a stocky build. Frozen specimens (including the Selerikan as well as the female Indigirka/'Sana" and Bilibino mummies) indicate that they were covered in long and thick hair, with the coat colour being brown to light bay/dun, with a dark to jet black mane, with the lower parts of the limbs (cannons) being considerably darker than the rest of the body, with at least some individuals having a dark eel stripe running along the back.

== Ecology ==
Equus lenensis lived in cold steppe-tundra environments in Siberia. Dental mesowear analysis suggests that Lena horses were grazers, but also consumed other vegetation like browse and/or non woody herbaceous plants to some degree. Preserved colon contents of the Holocene "Yukagir horse" have supported a grazing, largely graminoid-based diet for E. lenensis. Remains of plants found in the Selerikan mummy suggest that its diet included sedges, mosses and other herbaceous plants, as well as some woody plants, including birch and dwarf willow. Wear on the hooves of the Selerikan mummy suggests that it used its hooves to clear snow from the ground to feed on the underlying vegetation, as is observed in living Yakutian horses. Due to the freezing temperatures of Siberia, which can go as low as −70 °C (−94 °F), the species probably had physiological adaptions similar to those of living Yakutian horses allowing them to tolerate the extreme cold.

== Taxonomy and evolution ==
Genetic studies show that E. lenensis does not descend from the last common ancestor of living horses, and is estimated to have diverged from them approximately 115,000 years ago, being one of the most divergent known Eurasian horse lineages alongside prehistoric Iberian wild horses. E. lenensis may have received gene flow from now extinct ghost populations of horses, which may at least partially explain its genetic distinctiveness from other wild horses. Some Late Pleistocene Siberian horses (which of which E. lenensis forms part) have small amounts (less than 1% ancestry) from North American horses. Siberian horses are also closely related to other extinct eastern Eurasian horse populations, including the Chinese Equus dalianensis. Some individuals assigned to E. lenensis exhibit mitochondrial genomes more closely related to those of modern horses than to other E. lenensis individuals.

The youngest remains of the species date to 5,000 years Before Present (~3000 BC).
