= Betenkyos =

Betenkyos Бетенкёс
- Selo

Other transcription(s)
  - Sakha: Бөтөҥкөс
- Interactive map of Betenkyos
- Location of Betenkyos Betenkyos (Sakha Republic)
- Coordinates: 67°38′57″N 135°34′37″E
- Country: Russia
- Federal subject: Sakha Republic
- Administrative district: Verkhoyansky District
- Rural okrugSelsoviet: Adychchinsky Rural Okrug
- Founded: 1934

Population (2010 Census)
  - Total: 826
  - Estimate (2021): 619 (−25.1%)

Administrative status
  - Capital of: Adychchinsky Rural Okrug

Municipal status
  - Municipal district: Verkhoyansky Municipal District
  - Rural settlement: Adychchinsky Rural Settlement
  - Capital of: Adychchinsky Rural Settlement
- Time zone: UTC+
- Postal code: 678505
- OKTMO ID: 98616404101

Betenkyos (Russian: Бетенкёс; Yakut: Бөтөҥкөс, Bötöŋkös) is a rural locality (a selo), the administrative center of, and one of three settlements in addition to Alysardakh and Engya-Sayylyga in Adychchinsky Rural Okrug of Verkhoyansky District in the Sakha Republic, Russia, located 46 kilometers (29 mi) from Batagay, the administrative center of the district. Its population as of the 2010 Census was 826; up from 805 recorded during the 2002 Census.
