= Ynnakh Mountain =

Mountain in the Republic of Sakha, Russia

- Arga Ynnakh Khaya; Gora Ulakhan Ynnakh; Mat Gora
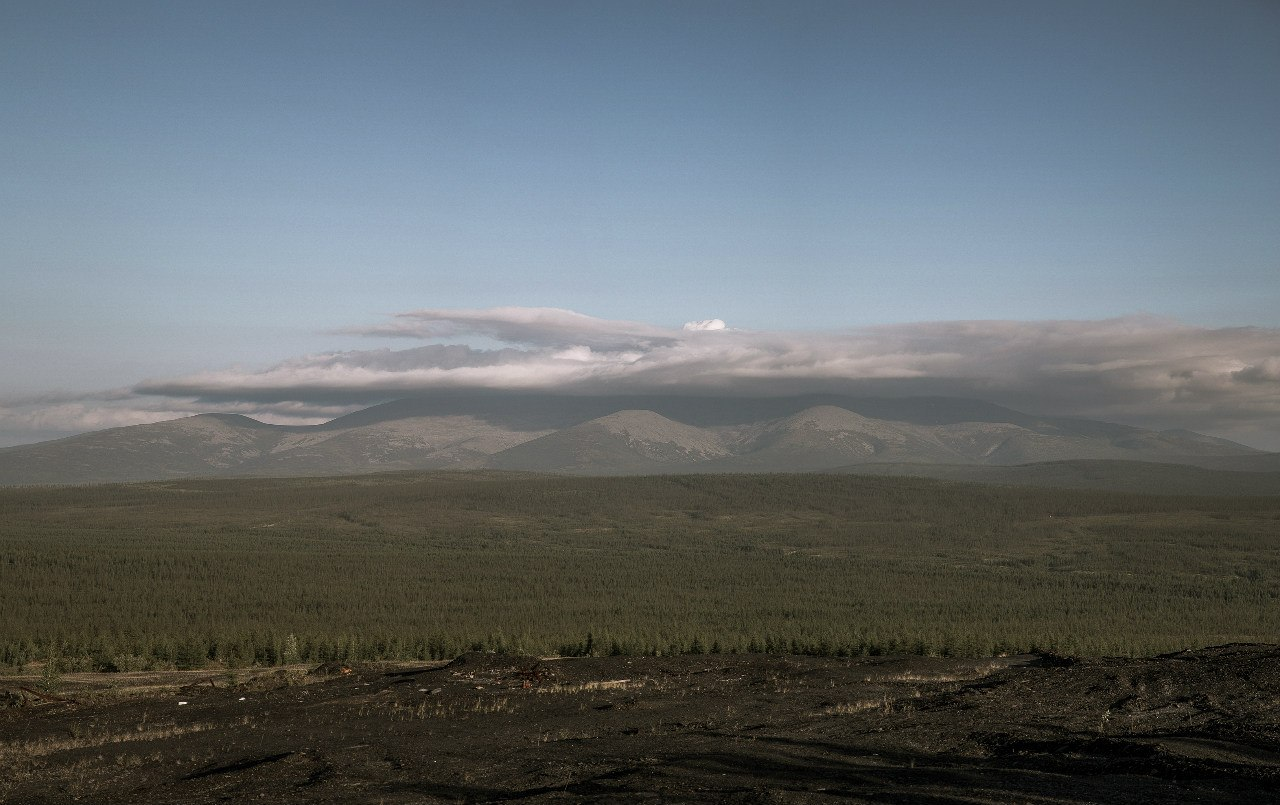
- View of the mountain

Highest point
- Elevation: 1,609 m (5,279 ft)
- Prominence: 1,178 m (3,865 ft)
- Listing: Mountains of Russia, Ribu
- Coordinates: 67°25′N 134°52′E

Dimensions
- Area: 134 km^{2} (52 mi^{2})

Geography
- Location within Sakha Republic
- Location: Sakha Republic, Russia
- Parent range: Chersky Range

Geology
- Mountain type: Granite massif

Climbing
- Easiest route: From Ese-Khayya

Ynnakh Mountain, also known as Arga Ynnakh Khaya (Russian: Арга Ыннах Хая), Gora Ulakhan Ynnakh (Russian: Гора Улахан Ыннах) and as Mother Mountain (Russian: Мать-Гора), is a mountain in Verkhoyansky District, Yakutia, Russian Federation.

The mountain has been classified as a natural monument of Russia with number 1420068. It is an important mountain in Yakut culture, where the word "Ynnakh" comes from Yakut: Ыыннаах, romanized: Iınnâx, meaning scary, creepy.

== Geography ==
Ynnakh Mountain is a granite massif located north of the Yana Plateau between the Yana River and the Adycha, a right hand tributary of the Yana. The mountain rises at the western limit of the Chersky Range, near the eastern foothills of the Verkhoyansk Range, a few miles to the southeast of Ese-Khayya.

The height of the summit is 1,609 metres (5,279 ft) according to the Operational Navigation Chart. According to other sources it is 1,622 metres (5,322 ft) high. The mineral kesterite is found in the mountain.

== Flora ==
There is sparse forest in the lower slopes and at the feet of the mountain. Mid and higher elevations have mountain tundra with mosses and lichens.

== See also ==
- List of mountains in Russia
