= Boronuk =

Boronuk Боронук Боронук (Sakha)
- Selo
- Interactive map of Boronuk
- Location of Boronuk Boronuk (Sakha Republic)
- Coordinates: 67°34′58″N 133°26′53″E
- Country: Russia
- Federal subject: Sakha Republic
- Administrative district: Verkhoyansky District
- Rural okrugSelsoviet: Babushinsky Rural Okrug

Population (2010 Census)
  - Total: 307
  - Estimate (2021): 260 (−15.3%)

Administrative status
  - Capital of: Babushinsky Rural Okrug

Municipal status
  - Municipal district: Verkhoyansky Municipal District
  - Rural settlement: Babushinsky Rural Settlement
  - Capital of: Babushinsky Rural Settlement
- Time zone: UTC+
- Postal code: 678530
- OKTMO ID: 98616477101

Boronuk (Russian: Боронук; Yakut: Боронук) is a rural locality (a selo), the administrative center of, and one of two settlements in addition to Machakh in Babushinsky Rural Okrug of Verkhoyansky District in the Sakha Republic, Russia, located 107 kilometers (66 mi) from Batagay, the administrative center of the district. Its population as of the 2010 Census was 307; down from 364 recorded in the 2002 Census.
