= Alysardakh, Verkhoyansky District, Sakha Republic =

Alysardakh Алысардах Алыһардаах (Sakha)
- Selo
- Interactive map of Alysardakh
- Location of Alysardakh Alysardakh (Sakha Republic)
- Coordinates: 67°27′N 135°30′E
- Country: Russia
- Federal subject: Sakha Republic
- Administrative district: Verkhoyansky District
- Rural okrugSelsoviet: Adychchinsky Rural Okrug

Population (2010 Census)
  - Total: 94
  - Estimate (2021): 97 (+3.2%)

Municipal status
  - Municipal district: Verkhoyansky Municipal District
  - Rural settlement: Adychchinsky Rural Settlement
- Time zone: UTC+
- Postal code: 678500
- OKTMO ID: 98616404106

Alysardakh (Russian: Алысардах; Yakut: Алыһардаах, Alıhardaax) is a rural locality (a selo) in Adychchinsky Rural Okrug of Verkhoyansky District in the Sakha Republic, Russia, located 73 kilometers (45 mi) from Batagay, the administrative center of the district and 30 kilometers (19 mi) from Betenkyos, the administrative center of the rural okrug. Its population as of the 2010 Census was 94; down from 103 recorded in the 2002 Census.
