= Sentachan =

Sentachan Сентачан Сентачаан (Sakha)
- Selo
- Interactive map of Sentachan
- Location of Sentachan Sentachan (Sakha Republic)
- Coordinates: 66°27′N 136°55′E
- Country: Russia
- Federal subject: Sakha Republic
- Administrative district: Verkhoyansky District
- SettlementSelsoviet: Batagay

Population (2010 Census)
  - Total: 12
  - Estimate (2021): 0 (−100%)

Municipal status
  - Municipal district: Verkhoyansky Municipal District
  - Rural settlement: Batagay Urban Settlement
- Time zone: UTC+
- Postal code: 678522
- OKTMO ID: 98616151106

Sentachan (Russian: Сентачан; Yakut: Сентачаан, Sentaçaan) is a rural locality (a selo) under the administrative jurisdiction of the Settlement of Batagay in Verkhoyansky District of the Sakha Republic, Russia, located 282 kilometers (175 mi) from Batagay, the administrative center of the district. Its population as of the 2010 Census was 12, up from 3 recorded during the 2002 Census.

== See also ==
- Sentachan mine
