= Baky =

River in Yakutia, Russia

Baky Бакы
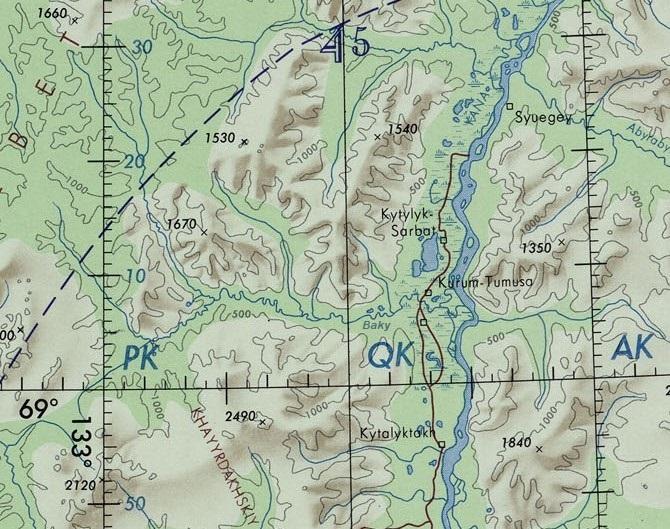
- Course of the Baky ONC map section

- Mouth location in Yakutia, Russia

Location
- Country: Russia

Physical characteristics
- Source
  - location: Khayrdakh Ridge; Kular Range
  - coordinates: 69°49′31″N 130°20′48″E
- Mouth: Yana
  - coordinates: 69°07′34″N 134°27′40″E
- Length: 172 km (107 mi)
- Basin size: 3,020 km^{2} (1,170 sq mi)

Basin features
- Progression: Yana → Laptev Sea

The Baky (Russian: Бакы; Yakut: Бакы, Bakı) is a river in the Sakha Republic (Yakutia), Russia. It is one of the northern tributaries of the Yana. The river has a length of 172 kilometres (107 mi) and a drainage basin area of 3,020 square kilometres (1,170 mi^{2}).

The river flows north of the Arctic Circle. Its basin falls within Verkhoyansky District.

== Course ==
The Baky is a left tributary of the Yana. It has its sources in the northwestern slopes of the Khayrdakh Ridge (Хайырдахский кряж), part of the Kular Range of the Verkhoyansk system. The river flows first northeastwards, skirting the mountain area. It meanders within a wide valley heading in an eastern direction in its lower course. Osokhtokh village is located by the banks of the Baky in its last stretch, where the river meanders very strongly. Near the left bank of the Yana the Baky divides into three branches, joining the river 479 km (298 mi) from its mouth.

=== Tributaries ===
The main tributaries of the Baky are the 35 km (22 mi) long Tulluk (Туллук), the 33 km (21 mi) long Yuyuteer (Ююттээр) and the 33 km (21 mi) long Tirekhteekh (Тирэхтээх) on the right, as well as the 45 km (28 mi) long Chyuyompe-Salaa (Чюёмпэ-Салаа) and the 79 km (49 mi) long Kharyly-Salaa (Харылый-Салаа) on the left. There are 80 lakes in the river basin. The river is frozen between late September or early October and late May or early June.

== See also ==
- List of rivers of Russia
