= Engya-Sayylyga =

Engya-Sayylyga Энгя-Сайылыга Эҥэ Сайылыга (Sakha)
- Selo
- Interactive map of Engya-Sayylyga
- Location of Engya-Sayylyga Engya-Sayylyga (Sakha Republic)
- Coordinates: 67°45′N 135°38′E
- Country: Russia
- Federal subject: Sakha Republic
- Administrative district: Verkhoyansky District
- Rural okrugSelsoviet: Adychchinsky Rural Okrug

Population (2010 Census)
  - Total: 6
  - Estimate (2021): 0 (−100%)

Municipal status
  - Municipal district: Verkhoyansky Municipal District
  - Rural settlement: Adychchinsky Rural Settlement
- Time zone: UTC+
- Postal code: 678522
- OKTMO ID: 98616404111

Engya-Sayylyga (Russian: Энгя-Сайылыга; Yakut: Эҥэ Сайылыга, Eŋe Sayılıga) is a rural locality (a selo) in Adychchinsky Rural Okrug of Verkhoyansky District in the Sakha Republic, Russia, located 66 kilometers (41 mi) from Batagay, the administrative center of the district and 20 kilometers (12 mi) from Betenkyos, the administrative center of the rural okrug. Its population as of the 2010 Census was 6; up from 1 recorded in the 2002 Census.
