= Khayysardakh =

Khayysardakh Хайысардах Хайыһардаах (Sakha)
- Selo
- Interactive map of Khayysardakh
- Location of Khayysardakh Khayysardakh (Sakha Republic)
- Coordinates: 67°57′52″N 134°44′32″E
- Country: Russia
- Federal subject: Sakha Republic
- Administrative district: Verkhoyansky District
- Rural okrugSelsoviet: Elgessky Rural Okrug
- Elevation: 131 m (430 ft)

Population (2010 Census)
  - Total: 404
  - Estimate (2021): 364 (−9.9%)

Administrative status
  - Capital of: Elgessky Rural Okrug

Municipal status
  - Municipal district: Verkhoyansky Municipal District
  - Rural settlement: Elgessky Rural Settlement
  - Capital of: Elgessky Rural Settlement
- Time zone: UTC+
- Postal code: 678522
- OKTMO ID: 98616470101

Khayysardakh (Russian: Хайысардах; Yakut: Хайыһардаах, Xayıhardaax) is a rural locality (a selo), the only inhabited locality, and the administrative center of Elgessky Rural Okrug in Verkhoyansky District of the Sakha Republic, Russia, located 58 kilometers (36 mi) from Batagay, the administrative center of the district. Its population as of the 2010 Census was 404, up from 343 recorded during the 2002 Census.
