= Sentachan Mine =

Mine in Sakha Republic, Russia

- Interactive map of Sentachan Mine
- Location: Sentachan, Sakha Republic, Russia; 66°27′54″N 136°55′03″E
- Products: Antimony, gold
- Opened: 1989
- Company: GeoProMining

The Sentachan Mine is an antimony and gold mine in the Sakha Republic, Russia. It is estimated that more than 110,000 tonnes (120,000 tons) of the ore remains, with around 20 to 25 percent antimony content as well as gold, silver and arsenic. The deposit at Sentachan was discovered in the 1960s and open-pit mining began in 1989; underground mining has been done since the late 1990s. In the 2020s, work was carried out to construct an ore processing plant on the site.

== Ore ==
The antimony-bearing ore deposit at Sentachan is an offshoot of the Sarylakh deposit, located around 400 kilometres (250 mi) to the south-southeast. The quartz-stibnite lodes were deposited in hydrothermal veins up to 6 metres (20 ft) thick. The veins are held within Triassic sedimentary rock beds (sandstones, siltstones and shales), with granite inclusions. The geology shows that the area was subject to volcanic activity.

The Sentachan deposit, taken with the Sarylakh ores, is the largest antimony deposit in Russia, comprising perhaps 5% of the world antimony supply. Estimates of quantity and quality of the ore remaining at Sentachan vary between 110,000 tonnes (120,000 tons) and 180,000 tonnes (200,000 tons) and an antimony content of between 20 and 25%. The gold content of the ore has been estimated at between 32 and 38.2 grams per tonne and the silver content at 13.4 grams per tonne. The deposits also contain harmful quantities of arsenic.

== Extraction ==
The ore deposits were discovered in the 1960s and extraction began at Sentachan in 1989. Initially the ore was removed by open-pit mining at some point between 1997 and 2000 extraction switched to underground mining.

The Sentachan and Sarylakh mines are the only two locations in Russia that extract antimony. The mineral rights to both are owned by GeoProMining; the Sentachan mine is operated by the company's Zvezda & Sarylakh subsidiary. By 2015 the two mines were the main suppliers of antimony to the Commonwealth of Independent States; gold was extracted as a by-product. In 2000 it was estimated that there remained sufficient ore to continue extraction at Sentachan for another 30 years.

In 2016 the industry news site Mining.com ranked Sentachan as the second coldest operational mine in the world with a minimum average temperature of −45.8 °C (−50.4 °F). The site lies 700 kilometres (430 mi) from the nearest town and in 2013 was reported as being accessible only by helicopter and, in the winter (February to April), by ice road. The ice road runs along the Elgi and Adycha rivers and is used to transport ore from the mine, and to bring in diesel and other supplies. It was reported that milder winters were threatening the continued use of the ice road.

By 2020 Russian billionaire Roman Trotsenko had become an investor in GeoProMining and helped finance a new ore processing plant at Sentachan. This would allow minerals to be extracted on site rather than the ore having to be transported to Sarylakh for processing. In May 2022 a fire broke out at Sentachan which destroyed a dormitory housing construction workers. There were no fatalities or injuries.
