= Cholbon, Russia =

Cholbon Чолбон Чолбон (Sakha)
- Selo
- Interactive map of Cholbon
- Location of Cholbon Cholbon (Sakha Republic)
- Coordinates: 67°44′56″N 134°41′47″E
- Country: Russia
- Federal subject: Sakha Republic
- Administrative district: Verkhoyansky District
- Rural okrugSelsoviet: Yansky Rural Okrug

Population (2010 Census)
  - Total: 5
  - Estimate (2021): 0 (−100%)

Municipal status
  - Municipal district: Verkhoyansky Municipal District
  - Rural settlement: Yansky Rural Settlement
- Time zone: UTC+
- Postal code: 678500
- OKTMO ID: 98616488106

Cholbon (Russian: Чолбон; Yakut: Чолбон, Çolbon) is a rural locality (a selo) in Yansky Rural Okrug of Verkhoyansky District in the Sakha Republic, Russia, located 13 kilometers (8.1 mi) from Batagay, the administrative center of the district, and 10 kilometers (6.2 mi) from Yuttyakh, the administrative center of the rural okrug. Its population as of the 2010 Census was 5; down from 19 recorded in the 2002 Census.
