= Barylas =

Barylas Барылас Барылас (Sakha)
- Selo
- Interactive map of Barylas
- Location of Barylas Barylas (Sakha Republic)
- Coordinates: 65°53′46″N 132°42′22″E
- Country: Russia
- Federal subject: Sakha Republic
- Administrative district: Verkhoyansky District
- Rural okrugSelsoviet: Barylassky Rural Okrug

Population (2010 Census)
  - Total: 103
  - Estimate (2021): 91 (−11.7%)

Administrative status
  - Capital of: Barylassky Rural Okrug

Municipal status
  - Municipal district: Verkhoyansky Municipal District
  - Rural settlement: Barylassky Rural Settlement
  - Capital of: Barylassky Rural Settlement
- Time zone: UTC+
- Postal code: 678527
- OKTMO ID: 98616412101

Barylas (Russian: Барылас; Yakut: Барылас, Barılas) is a rural locality (a selo), the only inhabited locality, and the administrative center of Barylassky Rural Okrug of Verkhoyansky District in the Sakha Republic, Russia, located 502 kilometers (312 mi) from Batagay, the administrative center of the district. Its population as of the 2010 Census was 103, up from 90 recorded during the 2002 Census.
