= Machakh =

Machakh Мачах Мачах (Sakha)
- Selo
- Interactive map of Machakh
- Location of Machakh Machakh (Sakha Republic)
- Coordinates: 67°33′22″N 132°53′56″E
- Country: Russia
- Federal subject: Sakha Republic
- Administrative district: Verkhoyansky District
- Rural okrugSelsoviet: Babushkinsky Rural Okrug

Population (2010 Census)
  - Total: 66
  - Estimate (2021): 83 (+25.8%)

Municipal status
  - Municipal district: Verkhoyansky Municipal District
  - Rural settlement: Babushkinsky Rural Settlement
- Time zone: UTC+
- Postal code: 678500
- OKTMO ID: 98616477106

Machakh (Russian: Мачах; Yakut: Мачах, Maçax) is a rural locality (a selo), and one of two settlements in Babushkinsky Rural Okrug of Verkhoyansky District in the Sakha Republic, Russia, in addition to Boronuk, the administrative center of the Rural Okrug. It is located 137 kilometers (85 mi) from Batagay, the administrative center of the district and 30 kilometers (19 mi) from Boronuk. Its population as of the 2010 Census was 66; down from 108 recorded in the 2002 Census.
