= Suordakh =

Suordakh Суордах Суордаах (Sakha)
- Selo
- Interactive map of Suordakh
- Location of Suordakh Suordakh (Sakha Republic)
- Coordinates: 66°40′51″N 131°46′23″E
- Country: Russia
- Federal subject: Sakha Republic
- Administrative district: Verkhoyansky District
- Rural okrugSelsoviet: Suordakhsky Rural Okrug
- Elevation: 216 m (709 ft)

Population (2010 Census)
  - Total: 354
  - Estimate (2021): 333 (−5.9%)

Administrative status
  - Capital of: Suordakhsky Rural Okrug

Municipal status
  - Municipal district: Verkhoyansky Municipal District
  - Rural settlement: Suordakhsky Rural Settlement
  - Capital of: Suordakhsky Rural Settlement
- Time zone: UTC+
- Postal code: 678511
- OKTMO ID: 98616448101

Suordakh (Russian: Суордах; Yakut: Суордаах, Suordaax) is a rural locality (a selo), the only inhabited locality, and the administrative center of Suordakhsky Rural Okrug of Verkhoyansky District in the Sakha Republic, Russia, located 402 kilometers (250 mi) from Batagay, the administrative center of the district. Its population as of the 2010 Census was 354, down from 407 recorded during the 2002 Census.
