= Yuttyakh =

Yuttyakh Юттях Үүттээх (Sakha)
- Selo
- Interactive map of Yuttyakh
- Location of Yuttyakh Yuttyakh (Sakha Republic)
- Coordinates: 67°35′46″N 134°26′52″E
- Country: Russia
- Federal subject: Sakha Republic
- Administrative district: Verkhoyansky District
- Rural okrugSelsoviet: Yansky Rural Okrug
- Elevation: 139 m (456 ft)

Population (2010 Census)
  - Total: 207
  - Estimate (2021): 130 (−37.2%)

Administrative status
  - Capital of: Yansky Rural Okrug

Municipal status
  - Municipal district: Verkhoyansky Municipal District
  - Rural settlement: Yansky Rural Settlement
  - Capital of: Yansky Rural Settlement
- Time zone: UTC+
- Postal code: 678502
- OKTMO ID: 98616488101

Yuttyakh (Russian: Юттях; Yakut: Үүттээх, Üütteex) is a rural locality (a selo), the administrative center of, and one of two settlements in addition to Cholbon in Yansky Rural Okrug of Verkhoyansky District in the Sakha Republic, Russia, located 18 kilometers (11 mi) from Batagay, the administrative center of the district. Its population as of the 2010 Census was 207; up from 203 recorded in the 2002 Census.
