= Equus dalianensis =

Equus dalianensis Temporal range: Late Pleistocene

Scientific classification
- Kingdom: Animalia
- Phylum: Chordata
- Class: Mammalia
- Order: Perissodactyla
- Family: Equidae
- Genus: Equus
- Species: †E. dalianensis

Binomial name
- †Equus dalianensis Xinxue, Yufeng, Qinqi & Yi, 1985

Extinct species of horse

Equus dalianensis is an extinct species of horse that lived in northern China during the Late Pleistocene epoch. This was a relatively large species of horse, being larger than both the extant Equus przewalskii and Equus hemionus.

It is named after Dalian, a city located in Liaoning province, where remains of the species were first found.

== Evolutionary history ==
The exact evolutionary origins and history of this species is unclear despite the abundance of material for E. dalianensis. Equus dalianensis is a true cabaline horse closely related to living domestic and wild horses, with a similar skeletal morphology to other true horses. It belonged to a distinctive mitochondrial genome lineage that is estimated to have diverged from those of living horses over 800,000 years ago, shortly after the divergence between North American and Old World horses. Some prehistoric Late Pleistocene horse remains assigned to Przewalski's horse also belong to this lineage, either indicating gene flow between the two species, or that these remains had been misassigned. A study of both mitochondrial and nuclear genomes published in 2026 showed that Equus dalianensis was closely related to and had interbred with northeast Siberian horses (which includes Equus lenensis), with some Equus dalianensis individuals having a small amount of ancestry ( up to 0.49–2.66% as reported in one 35,000 year old individual) from North American horses from East Beringia (remains of which have been assigned, to, among others, Equus lambei), higher than that reported in Siberian Pleistocene horses (generally negligible but up to 0.7%), suggesting a complex history of gene flow across the Beringia. The study concluded that the "Dalian horse does not represent a distinct lineage but rather forms a recognizable subclade within the broader Northeast Eurasian wild horse continuum".

During the late Pleistocene extinctions and the warming of the Holocene epoch, Equus dalianensis became extinct while the range of Equus przewalskii shrank. The genetic diversity of the species seems to have been relatively low prior to its extinction. The 2026 study concluded that Equus dalianensis was dependent on C_{3} grasslands, and that a decline in nitrogen isotope ratios in bones of E. dalianensis bones over time indicated "regional humidification and habitat transformation, which may have degraded forage quality and heightened demographic susceptibility [to extinction]".
