= Saydy, Verkhoyansky District, Sakha Republic =

Saydy Сайды
- Selo

Other transcription(s)
  - Sakha: Сайдыы
- Interactive map of Saydy
- Location of Saydy Saydy (Sakha Republic)
- Coordinates: 68°42′00″N 134°27′00″E
- Country: Russia
- Federal subject: Sakha Republic
- Administrative district: Verkhoyansky District
- Rural okrugSelsoviet: Eginsky Rural Okrug

Population (2010 Census)
  - Total: 560
  - Estimate (2021): 429 (−23.4%)

Administrative status
  - Capital of: Eginsky Rural Okrug

Municipal status
  - Municipal district: Verkhoyansky Municipal District
  - Rural settlement: Eginsky Rural Settlement
  - Capital of: Eginsky Rural Settlement
- Time zone: UTC+
- Postal code: 678521
- OKTMO ID: 98616464101

Saydy (Russian: Сайды; Yakut: Сайдыы, Saydıı) is a rural locality (a selo), the administrative center of, and one of two settlements in addition to Osokhtokh in Eginsky Rural Okrug of Verkhoyansky District in the Sakha Republic, Russia, located 193 kilometers (120 mi) from Batagay, the administrative center of the district. Its population as of the 2010 Census was 560; down from 684 recorded in the 2002 Census.
