= Batagaika crater =

Thermokarst crater in Siberia, Russia

- Depression
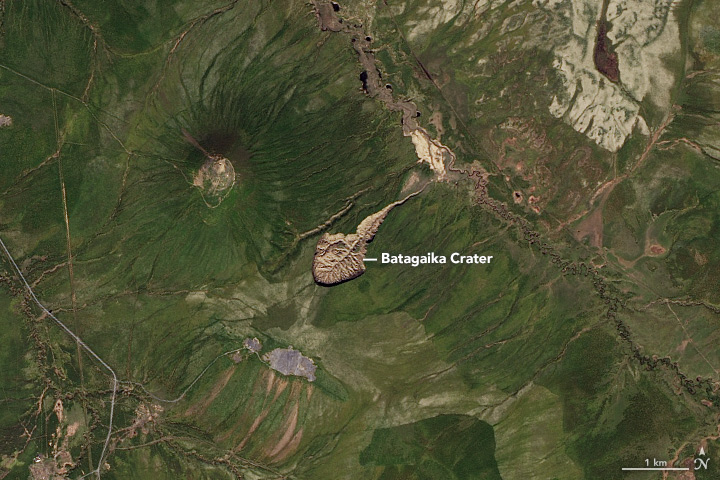
- Batagaika crater, 2016. NASA photo

- Location within Sakha Republic Location within Russia Location within Asia
- Coordinates: 67°34′48″N 134°46′17″E

The Batagaika crater (Russian: Батагайский кратер, romanized: Batagaysky krater) is a thermokarst depression in the Chersky Range area. The largest known permafrost crater in the world, it is within the Sakha Republic, Russia, in its Verkhoyansky District.

== Description ==
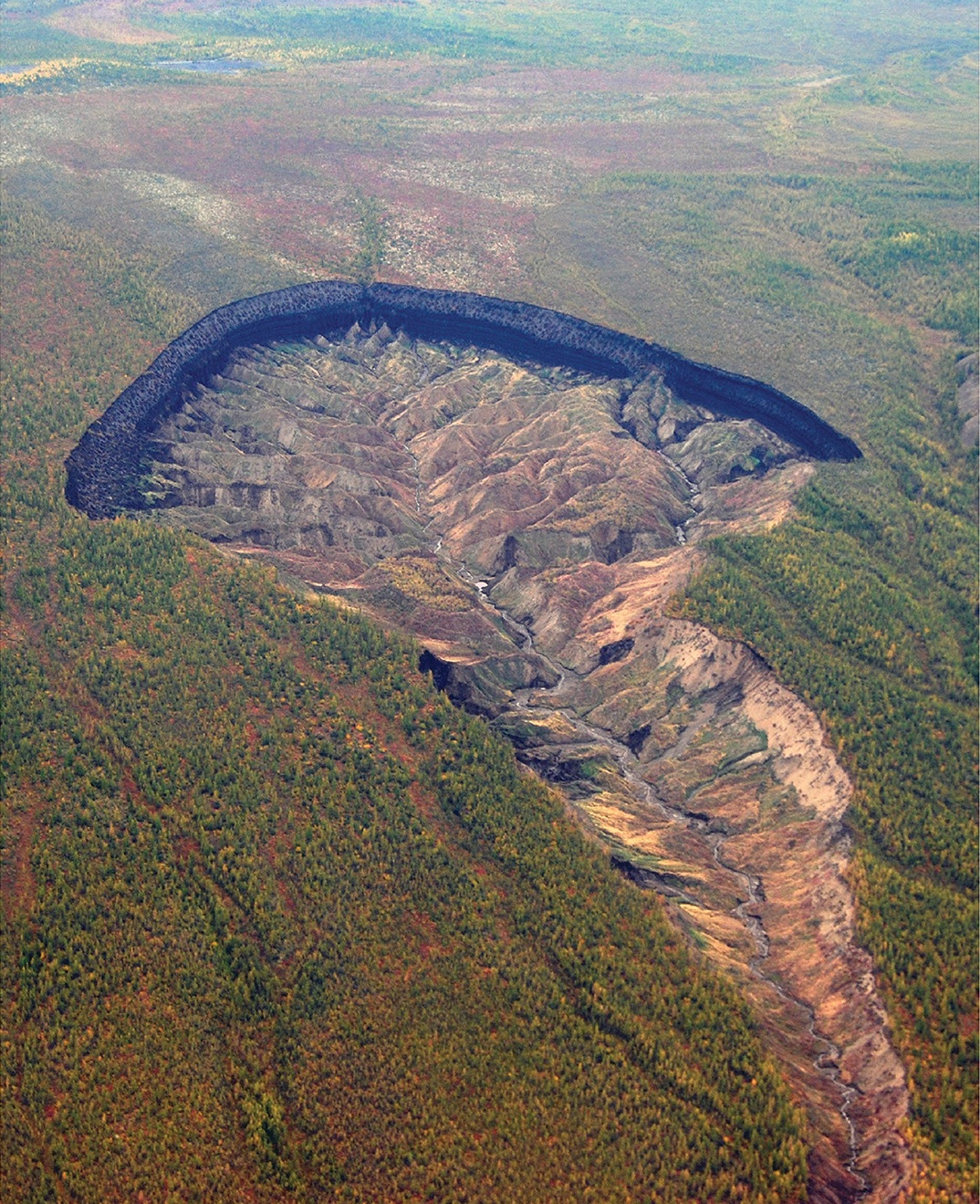
Aerial photograph of the Batagaika Crater

The depression is in the form of a one-kilometre-long gash up to 100 metres (328 feet) deep, and growing, in the East Siberian taiga, located 10 km (6.2 mi) southeast of Batagay and 5 km (3.1 mi) northeast of the settlement Ese-Khayya, about 660 km (410 mi) north-northeast of the capital Yakutsk. The structure is named after the near-flowing Batagayka, a right tributary of the river Yana. The land began to sink due to the thawing permafrost in the 1960s after the surrounding forest was cleared. Flooding also contributed to the enlargement of the crater. Paleontologists have found Ice Age fossils buried in the mud around the rim of the crater. The rim is extremely unstable as there are regular landslides into the crater and the permafrost is constantly thawing. The crater is currently growing in size.

According to Mary Edwards of the University of Southampton, the process of erosion that increases the crater's size occurs in the following way:

Below the cliff face, steep hills and gullies drop to Batagaika's floor. As more of the material at the bottom of the slope melts and comes loose, a larger face is exposed to the air, which in turn increases the speed of permafrost thawing. The crater will likely eat through the entire hillslope before it slows down. Every year as soon as temperatures go above freezing, it's going to start happening again. Once you've exposed something like this, it's very hard to stop it.

According to a conference paper published in 2016 the crater did not show any signs of stabilization after several decades (since 1980s) of slump growth, with the headwall retreating with observed rates of generally >10 m and up to 30 m per year closer to 2016. Reconstruction of a paleo-surface revealed that the slump had carved at the time into the rolling topography to a depth of up to 73 m. The current size of the slump was then >69 ha, and it had thawed >25 × 10⁶ m³ of ice-rich permafrost through 2016.

== Fossils and relation to climate ==
The rapid expansion of the crater is uncovering a host of fossilized materials, including ancient forests, pollen, and animal carcasses such as that of musk ox, woolly mammoth and Lena horse, along with other animals. It also allows for insight into 200,000 to 650,000 years of climate data.

Drone footage taken in 2023 revealed more details of the crater, and Nikita Tananayev, lead researcher at the Melnikov Permafrost Institute in Yakutsk interviewed by Reuters for the occasion, warned that the expansion of the Batagaika crater is a sign of danger; with increasing temperatures and anthropogenic pressure, more and more similar mega-slumps are likely to be formed in the future. The soil beneath the slump, which is about 100 metres deep (328 feet) in some areas, contains organic carbon stores that will be released into the atmosphere as the permafrost thaws, further fuelling the planet's warming.
