= Stolby, Verkhoyansky District, Sakha Republic =

Stolby Столбы Остуолба (Sakha)
- Selo
- Interactive map of Stolby
- Location of Stolby Stolby (Sakha Republic)
- Coordinates: 67°31′50″N 134°06′07″E
- Country: Russia
- Federal subject: Sakha Republic
- Administrative district: Verkhoyansky District
- Rural okrugSelsoviet: Barylassky Rural Okrug

Population (2010 Census)
  - Total: 318
  - Estimate (2021): 286 (−10.1%)

Administrative status
  - Capital of: Barylassky Rural Okrug

Municipal status
  - Municipal district: Verkhoyansky Municipal District
  - Rural settlement: Barylassky Rural Settlement
  - Capital of: Barylassky Rural Settlement
- Time zone: UTC+
- Postal code: 678502
- OKTMO ID: 98616445101

Stolby (Russian: Столбы; Yakut: Остуолба, Ostuolba) is a rural locality (a selo), the only inhabited locality, and the administrative center of Stolbinsky Rural Okrug of Verkhoyansky District in the Sakha Republic, Russia, located 48 kilometers (30 mi) from Batagay, the administrative center of the district. Its population as of the 2010 Census was 318, of whom 158 were male and 160 female, down from 324 recorded during the 2002 Census.
