= Yunkyur, Verkhoyansky District, Sakha Republic =

Yunkyur Юнкюр
- Selo

Other transcription(s)
  - Yakut: Үҥкүр
- Interactive map of Yunkyur
- Location of Yunkyur Yunkyur (Sakha Republic)
- Coordinates: 66°33′N 132°55′E
- Country: Russia
- Federal subject: Sakha Republic
- Administrative district: Verkhoyansky District
- Rural okrugSelsoviet: Sartansky Rural Okrug
- Elevation: 194 m (636 ft)

Population (2010 Census)
  - Total: 583
  - Estimate (2021): 435 (−25.4%)

Administrative status
  - Capital of: Sartansky Rural Okrug

Municipal status
  - Municipal district: Verkhoyansky Municipal District
  - Rural settlement: Sartansky Rural Settlement
  - Capital of: Sartansky Rural Settlement
- Time zone: UTC+
- Postal code: 678527
- OKTMO ID: 98616442101

Yunkyur (Russian: Юнкюр; Yakut: Үҥкүр, romanized: Üŋkür) is a rural locality (a selo) and the administrative center of Sartansky Rural Okrug of Verkhoyansky District in the Sakha Republic, Russia, located 362 kilometers (225 mi) from Batagay, the administrative center of the district. Its population as of the 2010 Census was 583; down from 598 recorded in the 2002 Census.
