= Bala, Russia =

Bala Бала Бала (Sakha)
- Selo
- Interactive map of Bala
- Location of Bala Bala (Sakha Republic)
- Coordinates: 67°11′N 132°50′E
- Country: Russia
- Federal subject: Sakha Republic
- Administrative district: Verkhoyansky District
- Rural okrugSelsoviet: Arylakhsky Rural Okrug
- Elevation: 150 m (490 ft)

Population (2010 Census)
  - Total: 543
  - Estimate (2021): 327 (−39.8%)

Administrative status
  - Capital of: Arylakhsky Rural Okrug

Municipal status
  - Municipal district: Verkhoyansky Municipal District
  - Rural settlement: Arylakhsky Rural Settlement
  - Capital of: Arylakhsky Rural Settlement
- Time zone: UTC+
- Postal code: 678526
- OKTMO ID: 98616409101

Bala (Russian: Бала; Yakut: Бала) is a rural locality (a selo) and the administrative center of Arylakhsky Rural Okrug of Verkhoyansky District in the Sakha Republic, Russia, located 142 kilometers (88 mi) from Batagay, the administrative center of the district. Its population as of the 2010 Census was 543; down from 579 recorded in the 2002 Census.
