= Ulakhan-Kyuyol, Verkhoyansky District, Sakha Republic =

Ulakhan-Kyuyol Улахан-Кюёль Улахан Күөл (Sakha)
- Selo
- Interactive map of Ulakhan-Kyuyol
- Location of Ulakhan-Kyuyol Ulakhan-Kyuyol (Sakha Republic)
- Coordinates: 67°32′27″N 136°30′39″E
- Country: Russia
- Federal subject: Sakha Republic
- Administrative district: Verkhoyansky District
- Rural okrugSelsoviet: Tabalakhsky Rural Okrug
- Elevation: 193 m (633 ft)

Population (2010 Census)
  - Total: 1,017
  - Estimate (2021): 776 (−23.7%)

Administrative status
  - Capital of: Tabalakhsky Rural Okrug

Municipal status
  - Municipal district: Verkhoyansky Municipal District
  - Rural settlement: Tabalakhsky Rural Settlement
  - Capital of: Tabalakhsky Rural Settlement
- Time zone: UTC+
- Postal code: 678504
- OKTMO ID: 98616453101

Ulakhan-Kyuyol (Russian: Улахан-Кюёль; Yakut: Улахан Күөл, Ulaxan Küöl) is a rural locality (a selo), the administrative center of, and one of two settlements in addition to Tala in Tabalakhsky Rural Okrug of Verkhoyansky District in the Sakha Republic, Russia, located 116 kilometers (72 mi) from Batagay, the administrative center of the district. Its population as of the 2010 Census was 1,017; the same as recorded in the 2002 Census.
