= Chyoryumche =

Chyoryumche Чёрюмче Чөрүмчэ (Sakha)
- Selo
- Interactive map of Chyoryumche
- Location of Chyoryumche Chyoryumche (Sakha Republic)
- Coordinates: 68°14′N 134°59′E
- Country: Russia
- Federal subject: Sakha Republic
- Administrative district: Verkhoyansky District
- Rural okrugSelsoviet: Chyoryumchinsky Rural Okrug

Population (2010 Census)
  - Total: 223
  - Estimate (2010): 223 (0%)

Administrative status
  - Capital of: Chyoryumchinsky Rural Okrug

Municipal status
  - Municipal district: Verkhoyansky Municipal District
  - Rural settlement: Chyoryumchinsky Rural Settlement
  - Capital of: Chyoryumchinsky Rural Settlement
- Time zone: UTC+
- Postal code: 678500
- OKTMO ID: 98616460101

Chyoryumche (Russian: Чёрюмче; Yakut: Чөрүмчэ, Çörümçe) is a rural locality (a selo) and the administrative center of Chyoryumchinsky Rural Okrug in Verkhoyansky District of the Sakha Republic, Russia, located 108 kilometers (67 mi) from Batagay, the administrative center of the district. Its population as of the 2010 Census was 223; up from 206 recorded in the 2002 Census.
