= Tomtor, Dulgalakhsky Rural Okrug, Verkhoyansky District, Sakha Republic =

Tomtor Томтор Томтор (Sakha)
- Selo
- Interactive map of Tomtor
- Location of Tomtor Tomtor (Sakha Republic)
- Coordinates: 67°11′59″N 132°08′27″E
- Country: Russia
- Federal subject: Sakha Republic
- Administrative district: Verkhoyansky District
- Rural okrugSelsoviet: Dulgalakhsky Rural Okrug

Population (2010 Census)
  - Total: 326
  - Estimate (2021): 281 (−13.8%)

Administrative status
  - Capital of: Dulgalakhsky Rural Okrug

Municipal status
  - Municipal district: Verkhoyansky Municipal District
  - Rural settlement: Dulgalakhsky Rural Settlement
  - Capital of: Dulgalakhsky Rural Settlement
- Time zone: UTC+
- Postal code: 678525
- OKTMO ID: 98616425101

Tomtor (Russian: Томтор; Yakut: Томтор) is a rural locality (a selo), the only inhabited locality, and the administrative center of Dulgalakhsky Rural Okrug in Verkhoyansky District of the Sakha Republic, Russia, located 232 kilometers (144 mi) from Batagay, the administrative center of the district. Its population as of the 2010 Census was 326, down from 454 recorded during the 2002 Census.
