= Thermokarst =

Irregular terrain formed when permafrost thaws

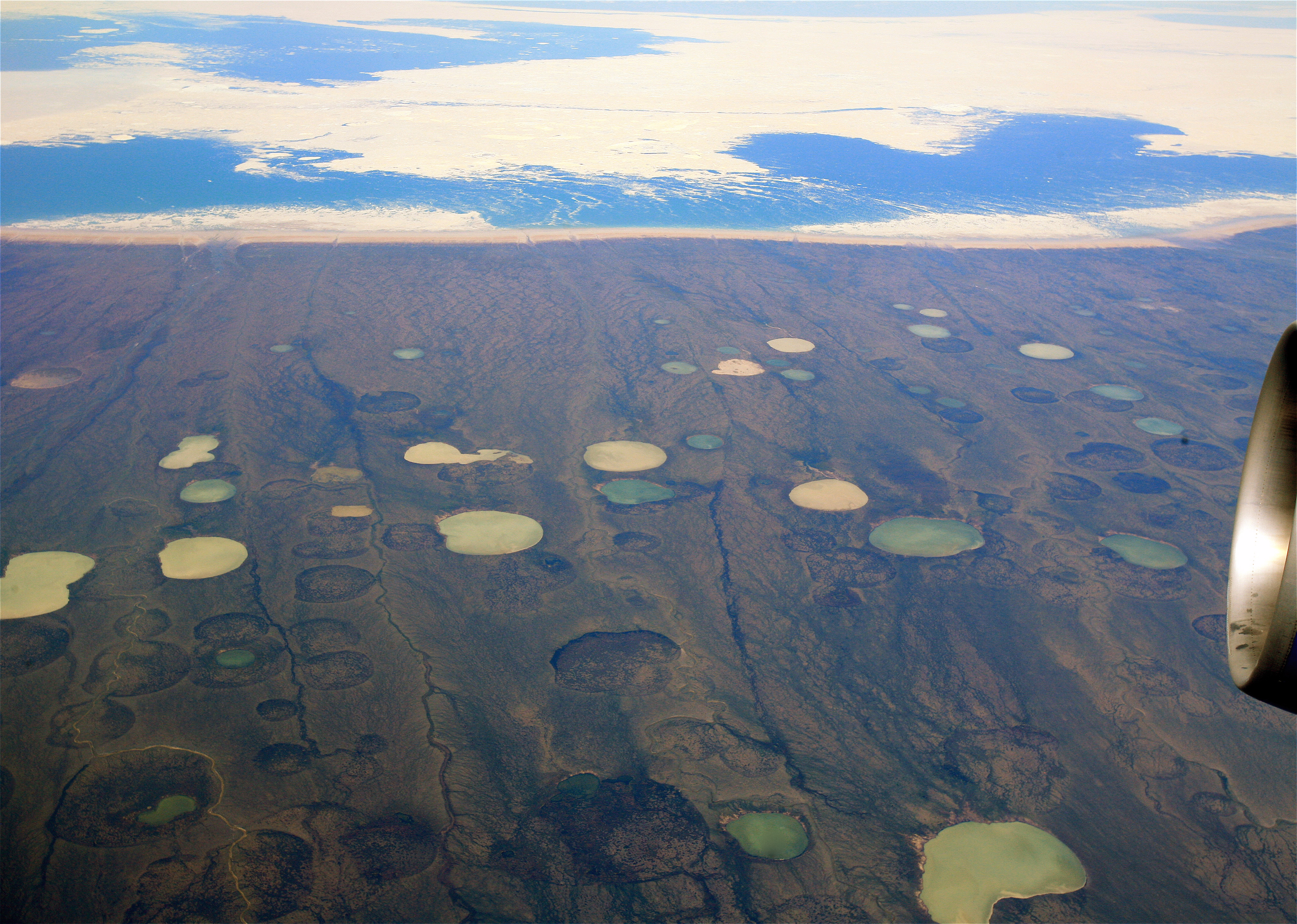
Permafrost thaw ponds in Hudson Bay, Canada, in 2008

Thermokarst is a type of terrain characterised by very irregular surfaces of marshy hollows and small hummocks formed when ice-rich permafrost thaws. The land surface type occurs in Arctic areas, and on a smaller scale in mountainous areas such as the Himalayas and the Swiss Alps.

These pitted surfaces resemble clusters of small lakes formed by dissolution of limestone in some karst areas, which is how they came to have "karst" attached to their name, even though no limestone is actually present. Small domes that form on the surface due to frost heaving with the onset of winter are only temporary features. They collapse during the following summer thaw, leaving a small surface depression. Some ice lenses grow and form larger surface hummocks ("pingos") which can last for many years, and sometimes become covered with grasses and sedges, until they begin to thaw. These domed surfaces eventually collapse – either annually or after longer periods – and form depressions which become part of the uneven terrains included under the general category of thermokarst.

The formation of permafrost thaw lakes due to warming climate is a positive feedback loop, as methane, nitrous oxide and carbon dioxide are released as permafrost thaws, contributing to further climate warming. The Batagaika crater in Siberia is an example of a large thermokarst depression.

== Thermokarst lakes ==
A thermokarst lake, also called a thaw lake, tundra lake, thaw depression, or tundra pond, is a body of freshwater, usually shallow, that is formed in a depression formed by thawing ice-rich permafrost. A key indicator of thermokarst lakes is the occurrence of excess ground ice as well as having an ice content with greater than 30% by volume. Thermokarst lakes tend to form and disappear in a cyclical manner, resulting in a predictable life cycle (see "life cycle" below). Continued thawing of the permafrost substrate can lead to the drainage and eventual disappearance of thermokarst lakes, leaving them, in such cases, a geomorphologically temporary phenomenon, formed in response to a warming climate.

These lakes are typically found in arctic and subarctic lowlands, including the western Canadian Arctic (e.g. Banks Island, Victoria island), the Alaskan coastal plain, interior Yukon Territory and the alluvial lowlands of northern Eurasia and Siberia. The presence of thaw lakes in a region results in a thermal disturbance as the water warms the ground.

The depth of permafrost below a lake will generally be shallower and if the lake is of sufficient depth, a talik is present. The general morphology (shape, depth, circumference) is variable, with some thaw lakes oriented, meaning they are generally elongated in a specific direction. Though their formation mechanism has not been definitively proven, it is believed to be related to the prevailing winds or storms. The disturbance (of either kind) leads to overall warming and melting of ground ice, after which surface subsidence occurs allowing for water infiltration of either surface water or melted ground ice.

Teshekpuk Lake on the Alaska North Slope within the National Petroleum Reserve–Alaska is the largest thermokarst lake in the world.

== Lake life cycle ==
=== Initiation ===
The initiation of a thaw lake begins with the degradation of ice-rich permafrost. The natural inception of thermokarst lakes can be demarcated into two separate processes; whether in continuous or discontinuous permafrost. In continuous permafrost, water accumulates when ice veins and polygonal ground are present. Through discontinuous permafrost, it is when thaw occurs in palsas (frozen peat cores) or in lithalsas (mineral core mounds). Permafrost degradation is typically linked to a surface disturbance, either natural or artificial, in combination with site-specific factors, such as permafrost ice-content, ground temperature, etc.

=== Development/expansion ===
Development of thaw lakes tends to be slow at first, but once the average lake bottom temperature exceeds 0 °C (32 °F) the lake ceases freezing to the bottom and thaw becomes continuous. The lake grows as ice thaws, which may result in the slumping of shorelines or submergence of vegetation, which is why thaw lakes in the boreal forest tend to be surrounded by "drunken trees". It should be specified that "drunken trees" (also known as "drunken forests") occur within Yedoma regimes. This feature is not present throughout all thermokarst regions. Upon expansion in this stage, thermokarst lakes often take on an elongated shape with ordered alignment in the long axis.

If lakes form in an area of ice-rich permafrost, coalescence of several smaller lakes may occur, producing a larger body of water, magnifying the thermal disturbance. Development may be further facilitated by lateral bank erosion. Additionally, thermal abrasion of thermokarst lake edges can expand the lake size, as well as lake bottom subsidence.

Oriented morphology of lakes can take on shapes such as "elliptical, egg-shaped, triangular, rectangular, clam-shaped, or D-shaped", and commonly occur in terrain with sandy sediments. Polemic scholastic discussions pertaining to development of lakes’ shapes are commonplace throughout the literature on orientation and morphology of thermokarst lakes. However, there are clearly a multitude of reasons beyond wind movement only, that contribute to the shape of lakes. Grosse et al. (2013) summarize endogenous and exogenous elements that are key factors in orientation, including:

- redistribution of littoral shelves by wind creating insulation;
- arrangement of polygonal ice-wedges producing thawing;
- erosion from fluvial channels causing inhomogeneous sediments.

=== Drainage ===
Before complete drainage, lake edges recede through retrogressive thaw slumps (RTS) and subaerial debris flows. Actual drainage may be triggered by fluvial erosion or expansion of adjacent basins at inland locations. In coastal areas, drainage may be due to coastal retreat leading to thermal abrasion or erosion due to wave action. More gradual drainage (partial or complete) may be caused by local permafrost degradation and erosion. Lakes stop growing once drainage is initiated, and eventually depressions are filled by sediments, aquatic plants or peat. Another option for the fate of a drained thaw lake is that the active layer surrounding the lake deepens to below water level once ground ice is exhausted, allowing for a residual lake to remain.

== Gallery ==
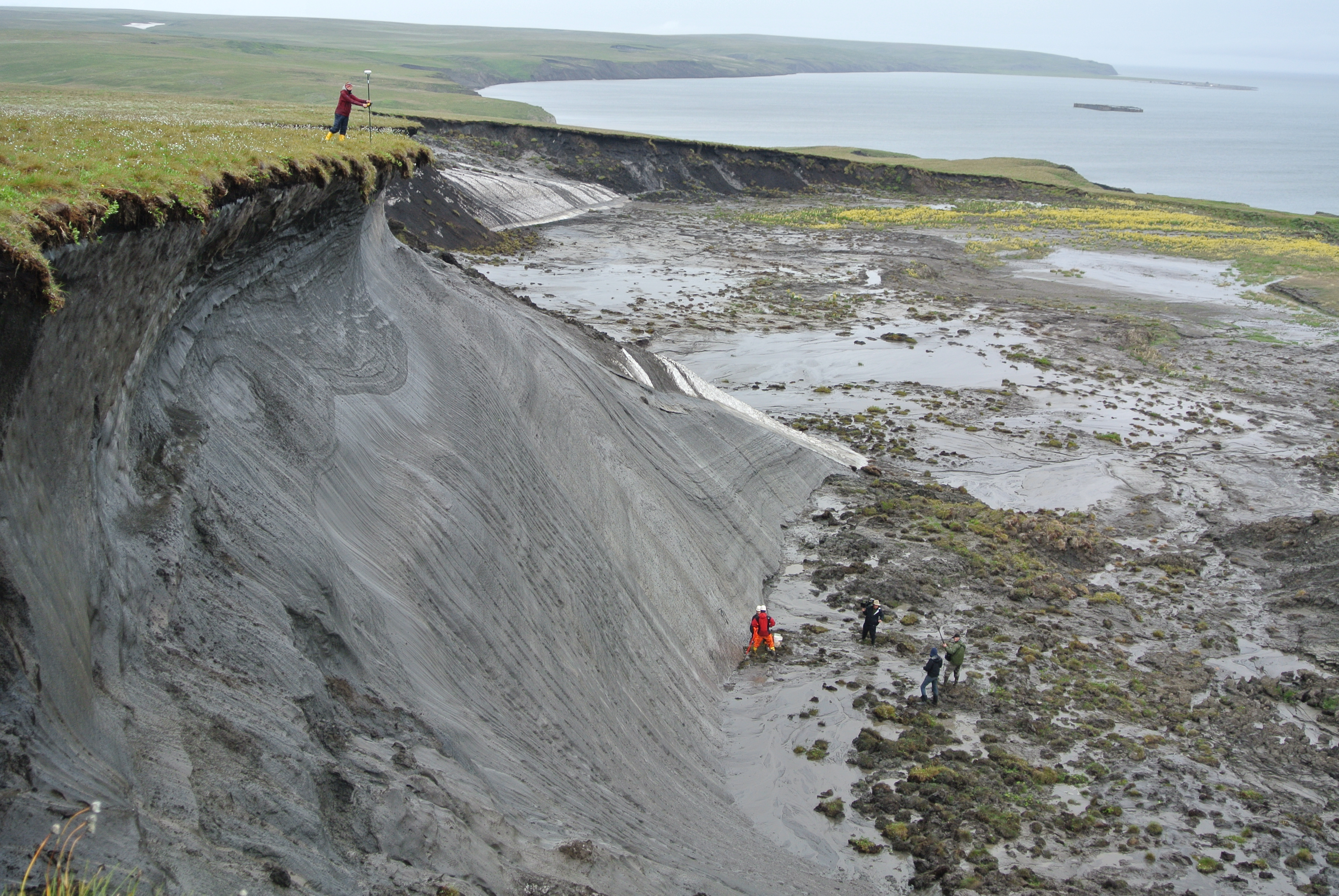
Thawing permafrost in Herschel Island, Canada, 2013

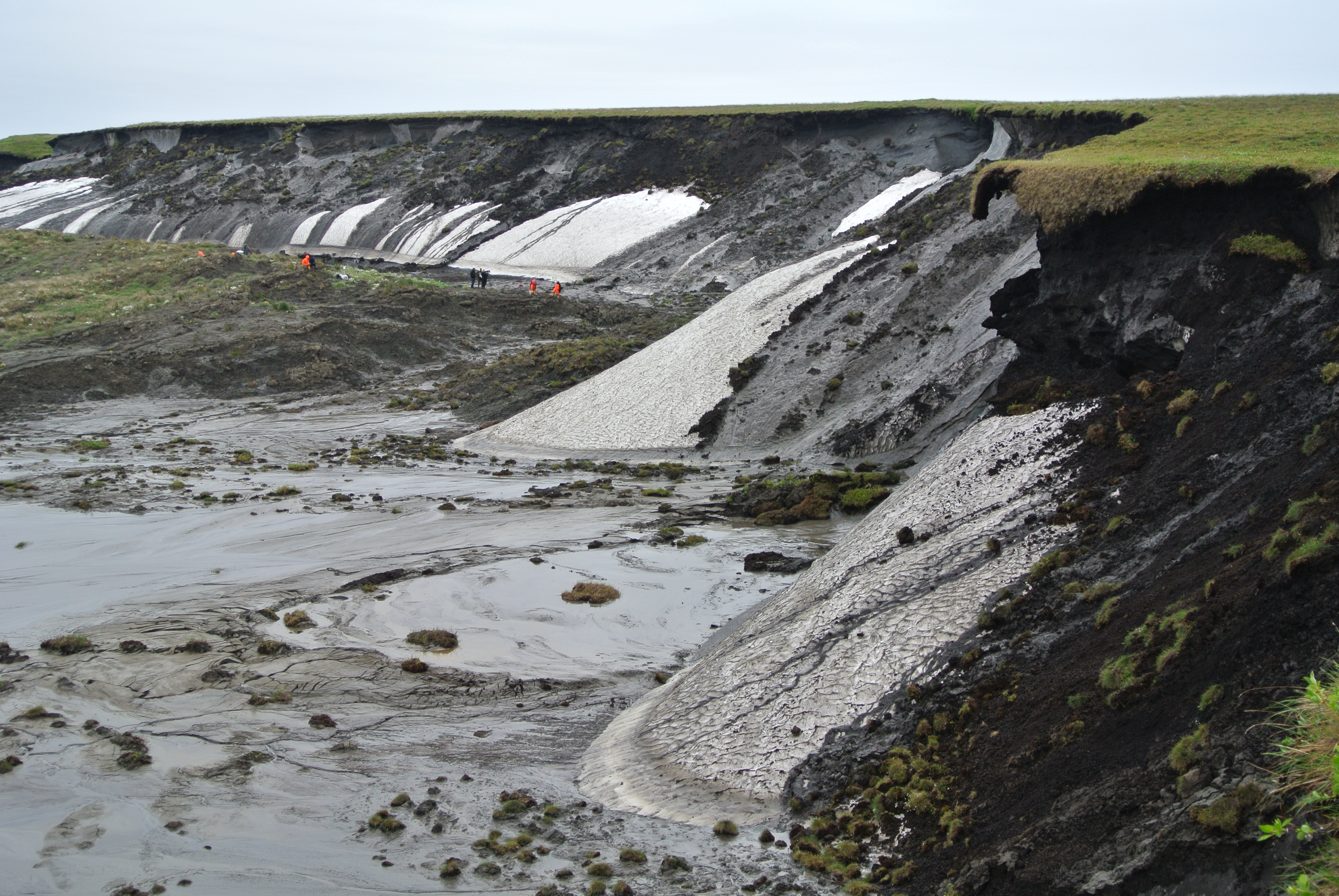
Thawing permafrost in Herschel Island, Canada, 2013

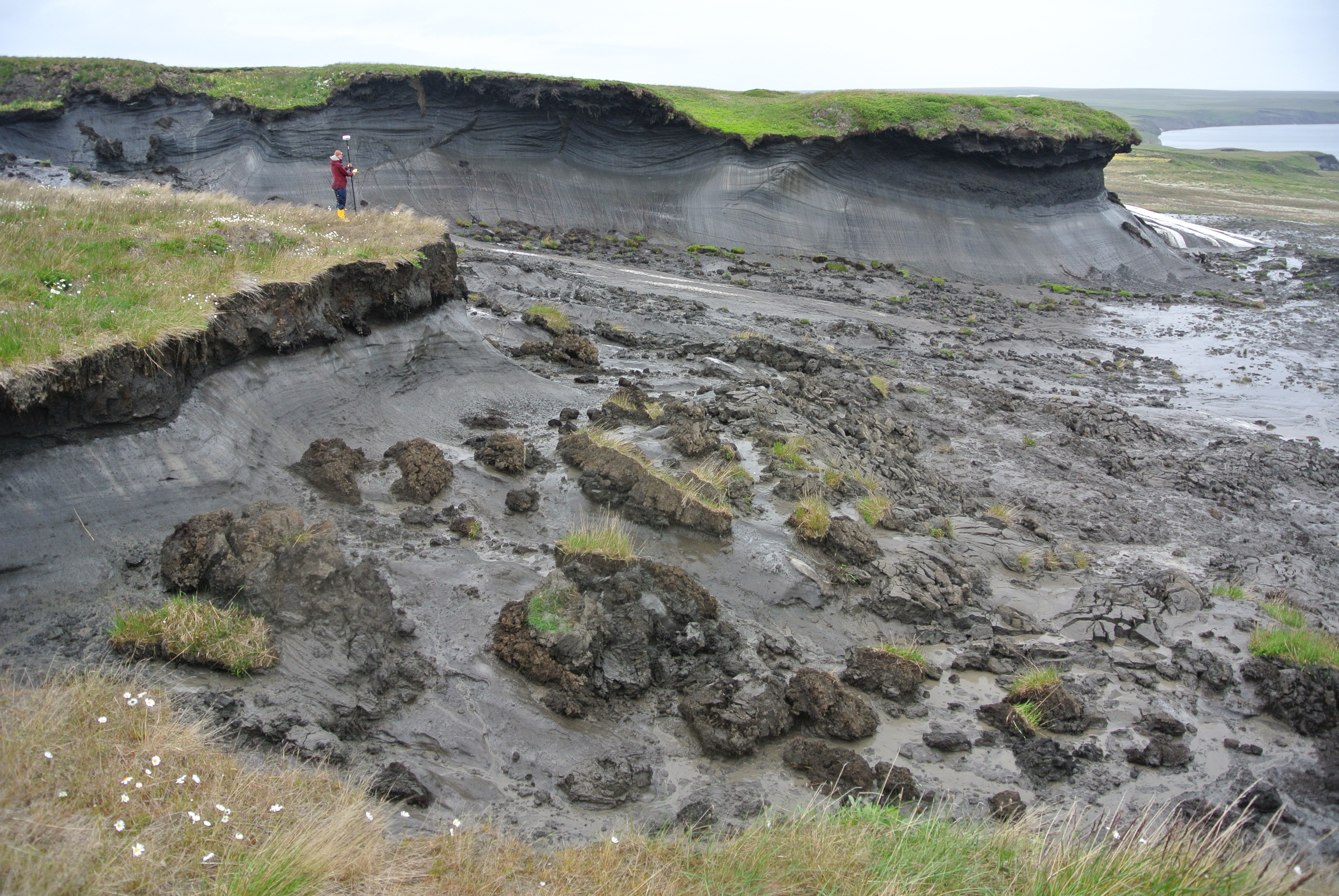
Thawing permafrost in Herschel Island, Canada, 2013

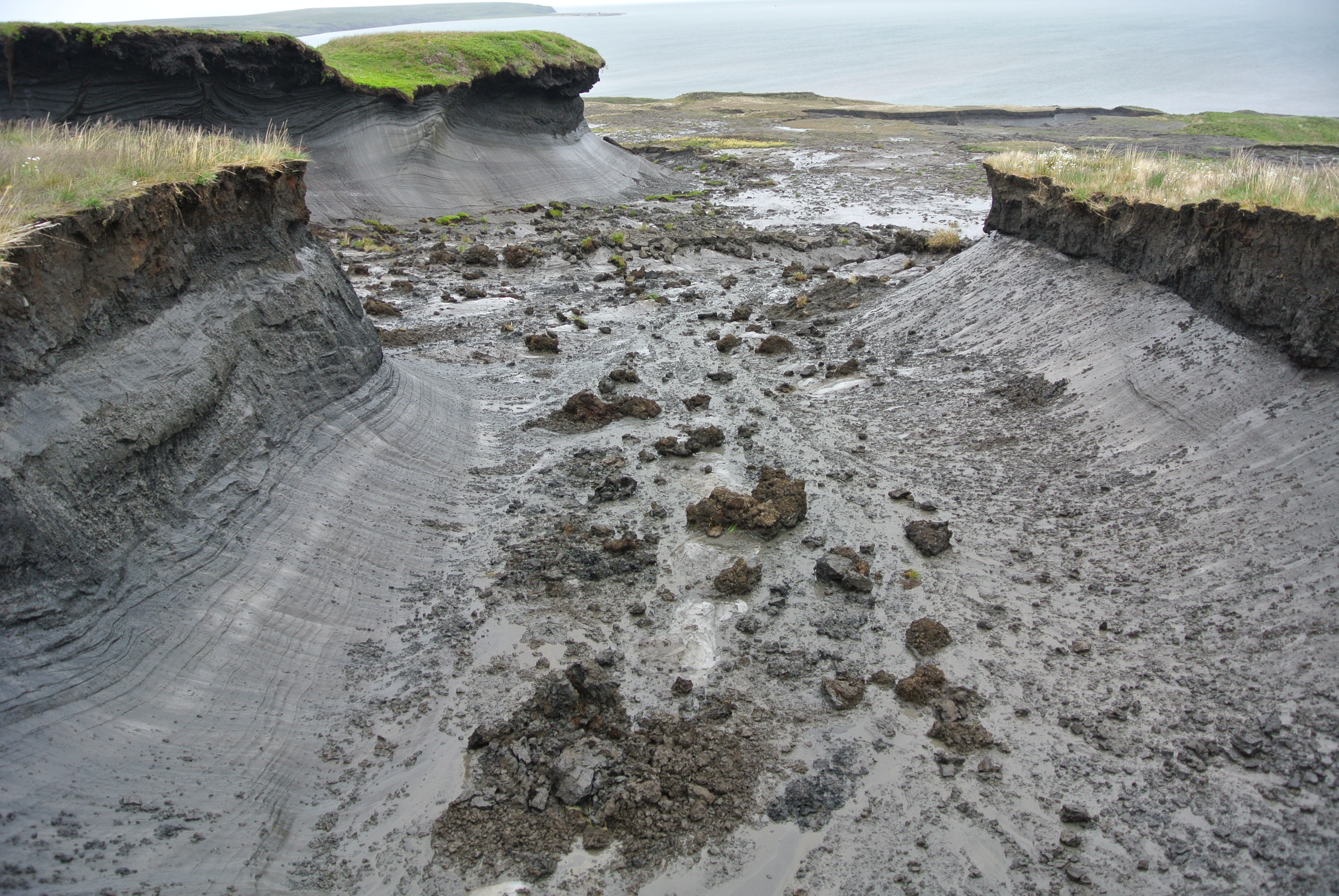
Thawing permafrost in Herschel Island, Canada, 2013

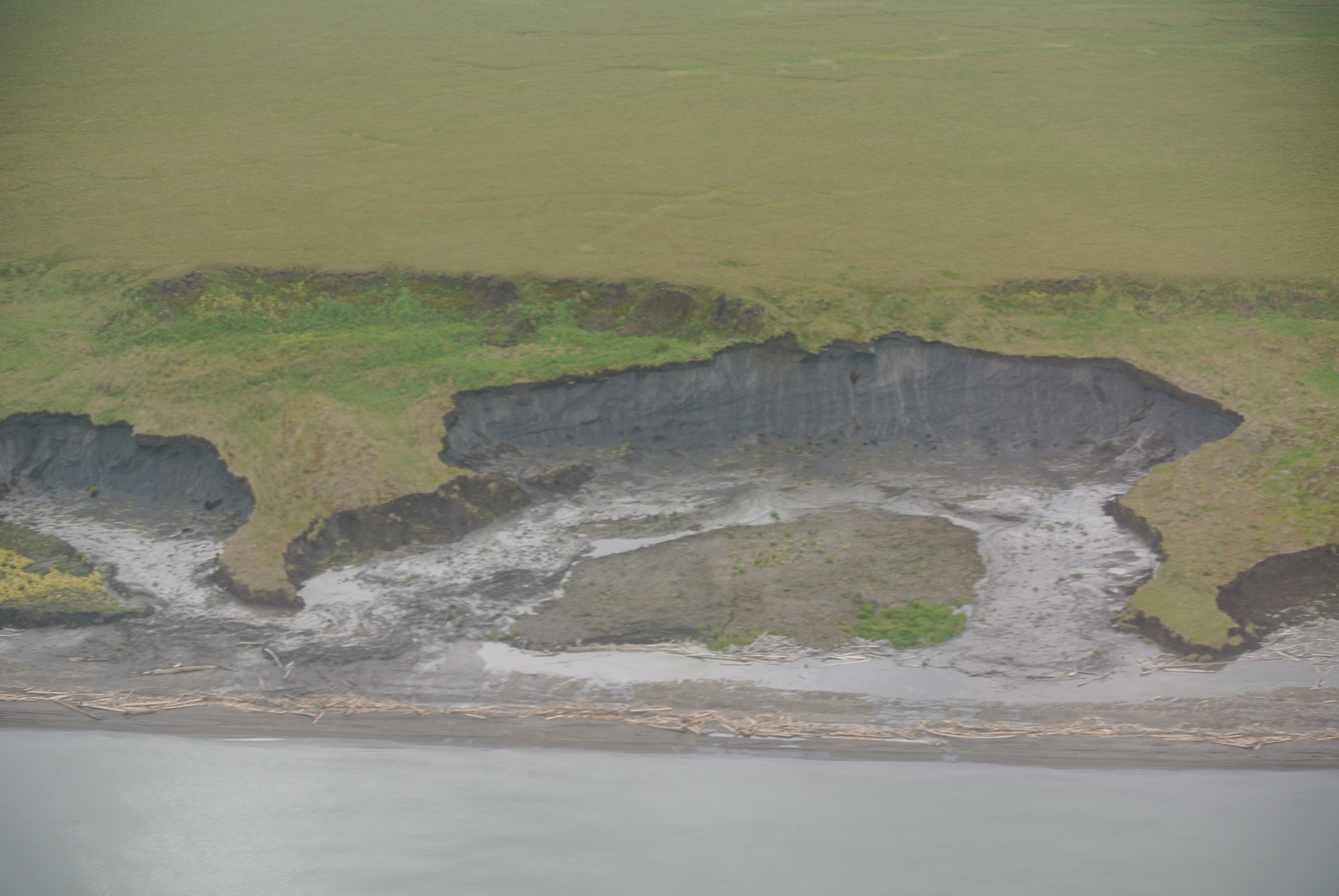
Thawing permafrost in Herschel Island, Canada, 2013

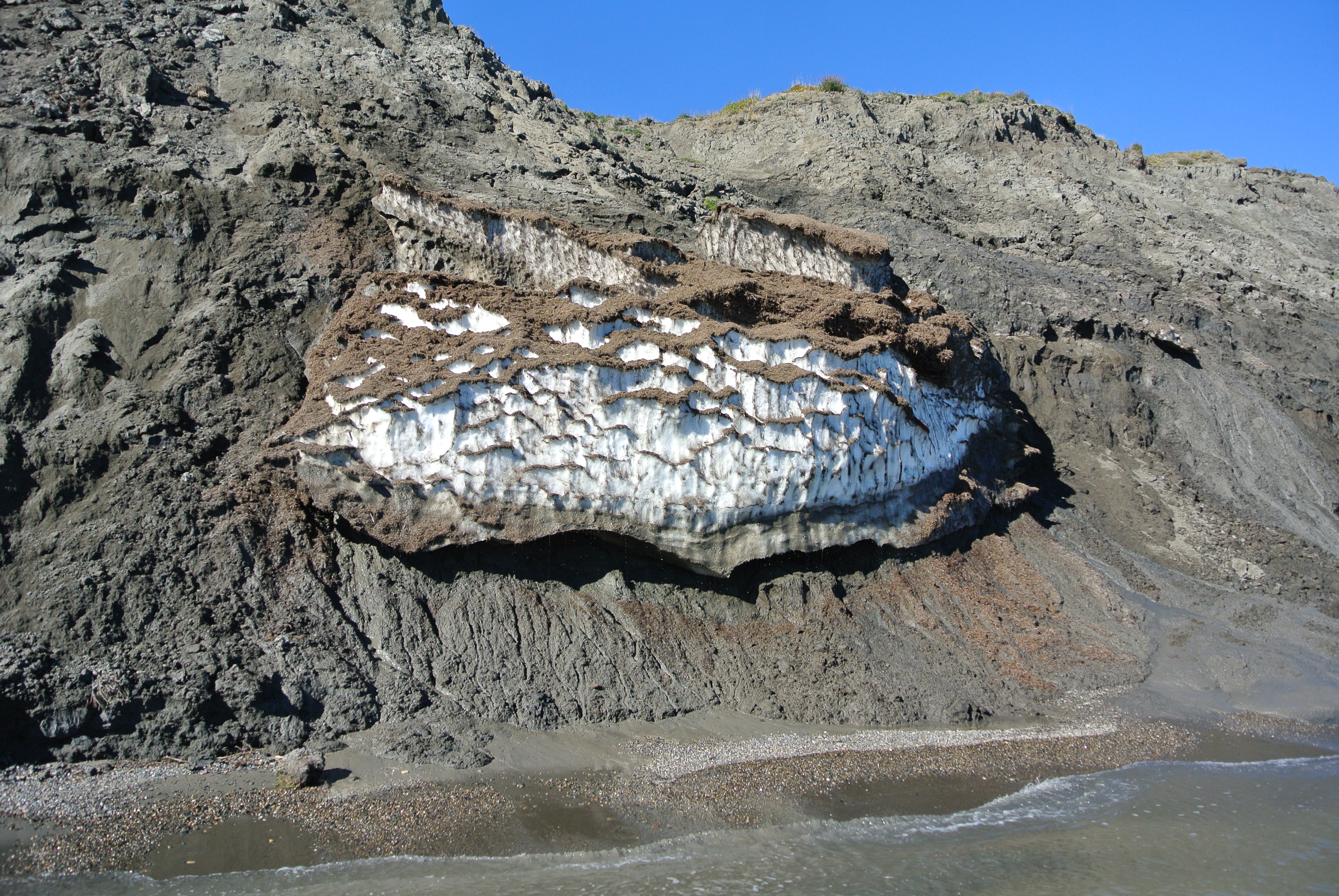
Permafrost and ice in Herschel Island, Canada, 2012

See more photos at Wikimedia Commons - Thermokarst.

== See also ==
- Arctic sea ice decline – Sea ice loss in recent decades in the Arctic Ocean
- Alas – Shallow depression formed by subsidence of the Arctic permafrost
- Batagaika crater – Thermokarst crater in Siberia, Russia
- Deglaciation – Transition from full glacial conditions during ice ages to warm interglacial conditions
- Pingo – Mound of earth-covered ice
- Periglacial lake – Lake bordering a glacier or ice sheet
- Retrogressive thaw slump – Dynamic feature of thawing permafrost terrain
