= Tomtor, Borulakhsky Rural Okrug, Verkhoyansky District, Sakha Republic =

Tomtor Томтор Томтор (Sakha)
- Selo
- Interactive map of Tomtor
- Location of Tomtor Tomtor (Sakha Republic)
- Coordinates: 67°09′N 134°42′E
- Country: Russia
- Federal subject: Sakha Republic
- Administrative district: Verkhoyansky District
- Rural okrugSelsoviet: Borulakhsky Rural Okrug

Population (2010 Census)
  - Total: 597
  - Estimate (2021): 499 (−16.4%)

Administrative status
  - Capital of: Borulakhsky Rural Okrug

Municipal status
  - Municipal district: Verkhoyansky Municipal District
  - Rural settlement: Borulakhsky Rural Settlement
  - Capital of: Borulakhsky Rural Settlement
- Time zone: UTC+
- Postal code: 678510
- OKTMO ID: 98616414101

Tomtor (Russian: Томтор; Yakut: Томтор) is a rural locality (a selo) and the administrative center of Borulakhsky Rural Okrug of Verkhoyansky District in the Sakha Republic, Russia, located 72 kilometers (45 mi) from Batagay, the administrative center of the district. Its population as of the 2010 Census was 597; up from 578 recorded in the 2002 Census.
