= Melnikov Permafrost Institute =

Research institute in Russia

- Институт мерзлотоведения им. П. И. Мельникова
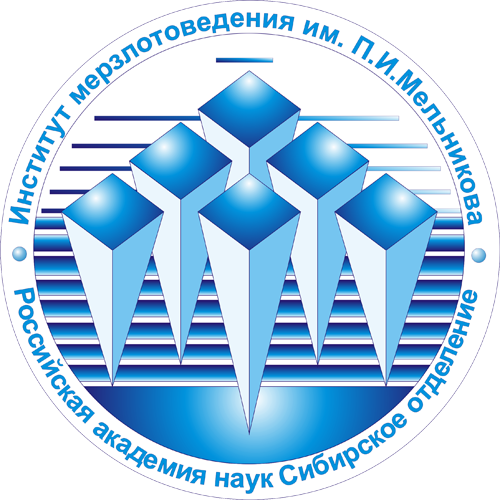

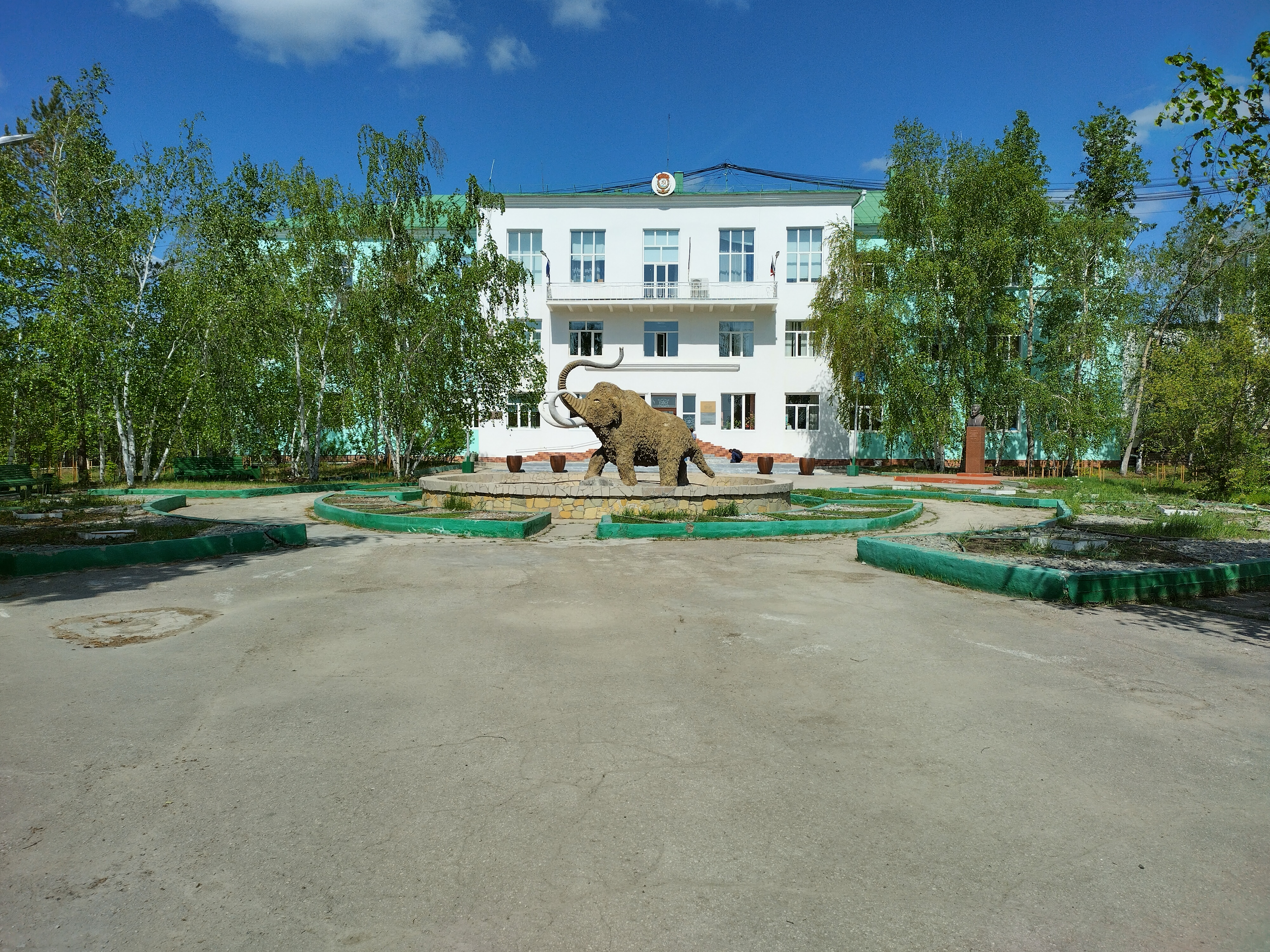

Agency overview
- Formed: 1960
- Preceding agency: V.A.Obruchev Permafrost Institute
- Headquarters: 36, Merzlotnaya str., Yakutsk, Russia, 677010
- Agency executive: Mikhail Nikolaevich Zheleznyak, director
- Parent agency: Siberian Branch of the Russian Academy of Sciences

Melnikov Permafrost Institute of the Siberian Branch of the Russian Academy of Science (Russian: Институт мерзлотоведения имени П. И. Мельникова СО РАН) is a research institute based in Yakutsk, Russia, a city built on continuous permafrost. It was founded in 1960.

In 2020, with global heating thawing the ground, the Institute is measuring the rate at which the permafrost is thawing, which affects the city as well as the climate.

== Inventions ==
Method for Determining Air Content in Frozen Soil and other.

== Divisions ==
- Laboratory of General Geocryology
- Laboratory of Permafrost Geothermics
- Laboratory of Permafrost Landscapes
- Laboratory of Permafrost Groundwater and Geochemistry
- Laboratory of Permafrost Engineering
- Geoinformatics Group
- Vilyui Permafrost Research Station
- North-Eastern Permafrost Station
- Igarka Geocryological Laboratory
- Kazakhstan Alpine Permafrost Laboratory

== Cryo-storage ==
Cryo-storage of seeds of rare and promising plants was opened in 2012.
