= Verkhoyansky District =

Verkhoyansky District Верхоянский улус (Russian)
- District

Other transcription(s)
  - Sakha: Үөһээ Дьааҥы улууhа
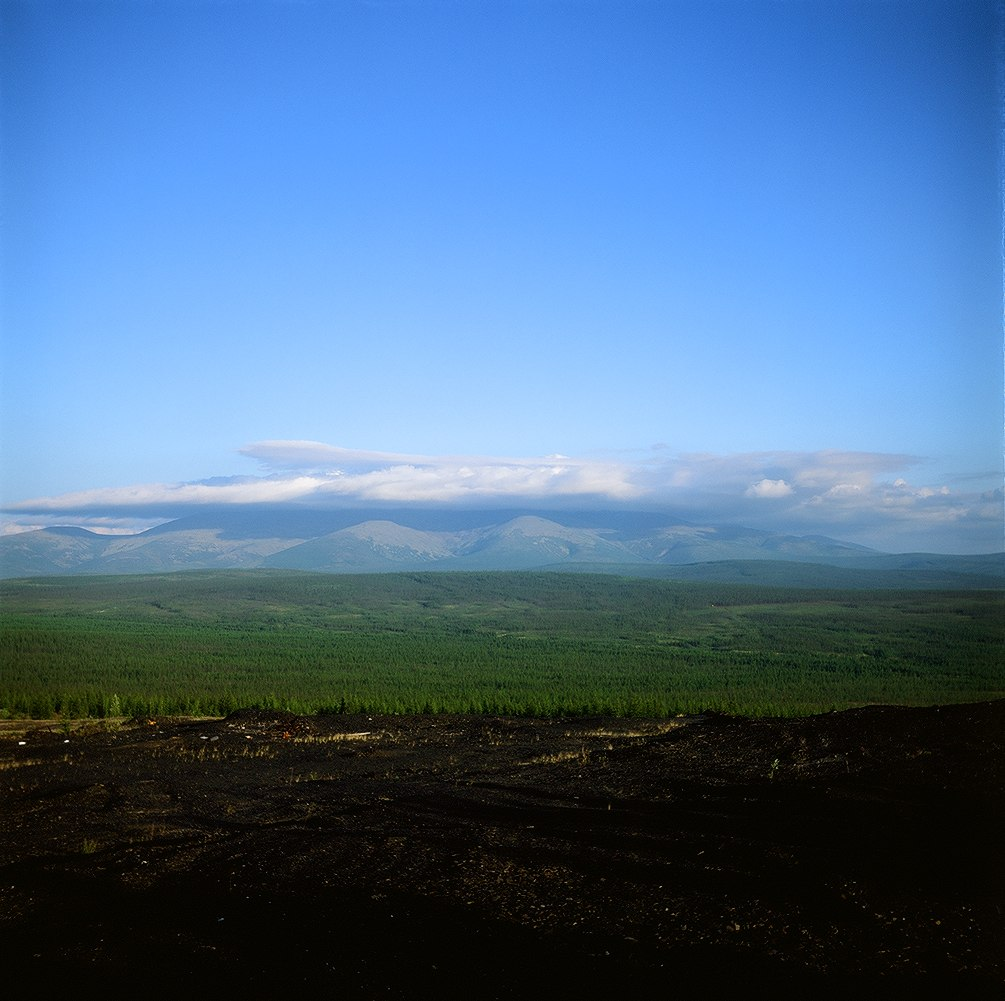
- Mat-Gora, Verkhoyansky District

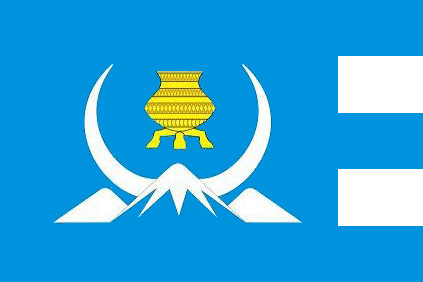
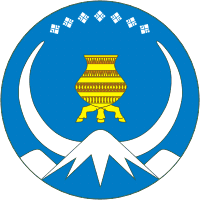
- Flag Coat of arms
- Location of Verkhoyansky District in the Sakha Republic
- Coordinates: 67°33′N 133°23′E
- Country: Russia
- Federal subject: Sakha Republic
- Established: January 5, 1967
- Administrative center: Batagay

Area
  - Total: 137,400 km^{2} (53,100 sq mi)

Population (2010 Census)
  - Total: 12,815
  - Density: 0.09327/km^{2} (0.2416/sq mi)
  - Urban: 46.2%
  - Rural: 53.8%

Administrative structure
  - Administrative divisions: 1 Towns under district jurisdiction, 2 Settlements, 14 Rural okrugs
  - Inhabited localities: 1 cities/towns, 2 urban-type settlements, 26 rural localities

Municipal structure
  - Municipally incorporated as: Verkhoyansky Municipal District
  - Municipal divisions: 3 urban settlements, 14 rural settlements
- Time zone: UTC+
- OKTMO ID: 98616000
- Website: https://mr-verhojanskij.sakha.gov.ru/

Verkhoyansky District (Russian: Верхоя́нский улу́с; Yakut: Үөһээ Дьааҥы улууһа, romanized: Üöhee Caañı uluuha, Yakut pronunciation: [ˈyøheː d͡ʑaːŋɯ uluːha]) is an administrative and municipal district (raion, or ulus), one of the thirty-four in the Sakha Republic, Russia. It is located in the northern central part of the republic and borders with Ust-Yansky District in the northeast, Momsky District in the east, Tomponsky District in the south, Kobyaysky District in the southwest, Eveno-Bytantaysky National District in the west, and with Bulunsky District in the northwest. The area of the district is 137,400 square kilometers (53,100 sq mi). Its administrative center is the urban locality (a settlement) of Batagay. Population: 12,815 (2010 census); 13,666 (2002 Census); 24,259 (1989 Soviet census). The population of Batagay accounts for 34.1% of the district's total population.

== Geography ==
The main river in the district is the Yana and its tributaries Nelgese, Derbeke, Tykakh and Baky.

=== Climate ===
Average January temperature ranges from −48 °C (−54 °F) to −38 °C (−36 °F) and average July temperature ranges from +16 °C (61 °F) to +17 °C (63 °F). Annual precipitation ranges from 150 to 300 millimeters (5.9 to 11.8 in).

== History ==
The district was established on January 5, 1967.

== Demographics ==
As of the 2021 Census, the ethnic composition was as follows:

- Yakuts: 78.8%
- Russians: 13.9%
- Evens: 5.0%
- Ukrainians: 0.5%
- other ethnicities: 1.8%

== Economy ==
The economy of the district is mostly based on agriculture. There are deposits of tin, tungsten, copper, lead, antimony, gold, silver, brown coal, and other minerals.

== Inhabited localities ==
Municipal composition
| Towns | Population | Male | Female | Inhabited localities in jurisdiction |
|---|---|---|---|---|
| Verkhoyansk (Верхоянск) | 1311 | 611 (46.6%) | 700 (53.4%) | Town of Verkhoyansk |
| Urban settlements | Population | Male | Female | Inhabited localities in jurisdiction |
| Batagay (Батагай) | 2756 | 1403 (50.9%) | 1455 (49.1%) | urban-type settlement of **Batagay** (administrative center of the district); selo of Senchatan; selo of Ust-Charky |
| Ese-Khayya (Эсэ-Хайя) | 239 | 120 (50.2%) | 119 (49.8%) | urban-type settlement of Ese-Khayya |
| Rural settlements | Population | Male | Female | Rural localities in jurisdiction* |
| Adychchinsky Nasleg (Адыччинский наслег) | 526 | 248 (47.1%) | 278 (52.9%) | **selo of Betenkyos**; selo of Alysardakh; selo of Engya-Sayylyga |
| Arylakhsky Nasleg (Арылахский наслег) | 559 | 283 (50.6%) | 276 (49.4%) | **selo of Bala**; selo of Metyaki |
| Babushkinsky Nasleg (Бабушкинский наслег) | 373 | 193 (51.7%) | 180 (48.3%) | **selo of Boronuk**; selo of Machakh |
| Barylassky Nasleg (Барыласский наслег) | 103 | 55 (53.4%) | 48 (46.6%) | **selo of Barylas** |
| Borulakhsky Nasleg (Борулахский наслег) | 737 | 383 (52.0%) | 354 (48.0%) | **selo of Tomtor**; selo of Tokuma |
| Dulgalakhsky Nasleg (Дулгалахский наслег) | 326 | 177 (54.3%) | 149 (45.7%) | **selo of Tomtor** |
| Sartansky Nasleg (Сартанский наслег) | 629 | 314 (49.9%) | 315 (50.1%) | **selo of Yunkyur**; selo of Sysy-Meyite |
| Stolbinsky Nasleg (Столбинский наслег) | 318 | 158 (49.7%) | 160 (50.3%) | **selo of Stolby** |
| Suordakhsky Nasleg (Суордахский наслег) | 354 | 177 (50.0%) | 177 (50.0%) | **selo of Suordakh** |
| Tabalakhsky Nasleg (Табалахский наслег) | 1018 | 501 (49.2%) | 517 (50.8%) | **selo of Ulakhan-Kyuyol**; selo of Tala |
| Chyoryumchinksy Nasleg (Чёрюмчинский наслег) | 223 | 126 (56.5%) | 97 (43.5%) | **selo of Chyoryumche**; selo of Yurdyuk-Kumakh |
| Eginsky Nasleg (Эгинский наслег) | 700 | 336 (48.0%) | 364 (52.0%) | **selo of Saydy**; selo of Osokhtokh |
| Elgessky Nasleg (Эльгесский наслег) | 404 | 200 (49.5%) | 204 (50.5%) | **selo of Khayysardakh** |
| Yansky Nasleg (Янский наслег) | 212 | 95 (44.8%) | 117 (55.2%) | **selo of Yuttyakh**; selo of Cholbon |

Divisional source:
Population source:
*Administrative centers are shown in bold
