= Khayyr =

Khayyr Хайыр Хайыр (Yakut language)
- Selo
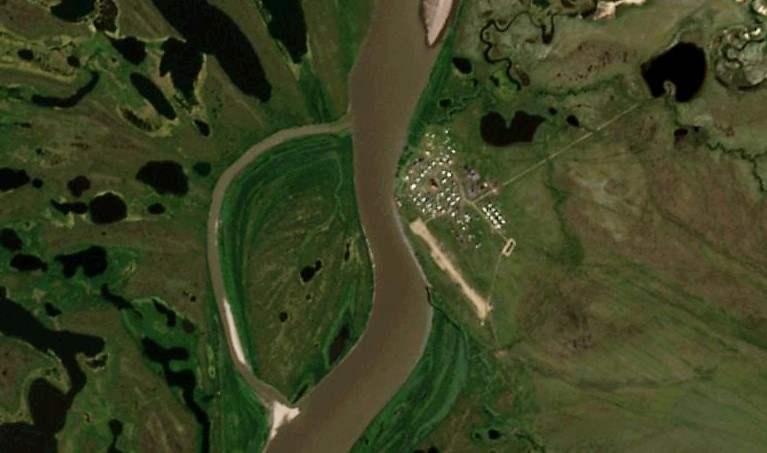
- Sentinel-2 image
- Interactive map of Khayyr
- Location of Khayyr Khayyr (Sakha Republic)
- Coordinates: 70°48′45″N 133°31′05″E
- Country: Russia
- Federal subject: Sakha Republic
- Administrative district: Ust-Yansky District
- Rural okrugSelsoviet: Omoloysky National Rural Okrug
- Elevation: 14 m (46 ft)

Population (2010 Census)
  - Total: 433
  - Estimate (2021): 419 (−3.2%)

Administrative status
  - Capital of: Omoloysky National Rural Okrug

Municipal status
  - Municipal district: Ust-Yansky Municipal District
  - Rural settlement: Omoloysky National Rural Settlement
  - Capital of: Omoloysky National Rural Settlement
- Time zone: UTC+
- Postal code: 678571
- OKTMO ID: 98656410101

Khayyr (Russian: Хайыр; Yakut: Хайыр, Xayır) is a rural locality (a selo), the only inhabited locality, and the administrative center of Omoloysky National Rural Okrug of Ust-Yansky District in the Sakha Republic, Russia, located 498 kilometers (309 mi) from Deputatsky, the administrative center of the district. Its population as of the 2010 Census was 433, of whom 223 were male and 210 female, down from 441 recorded during the 2002 Census.

== Geography ==
The village is located in the Yana-Indigirka Lowland, on the right bank of the Omoloy. The confluence of the Ulakhan-Kyuegyulyur is 12 km (7.5 mi) upstream of the village.

== See also ==
- Lake Khaiyr
