= Deputatsky (disambiguation) =

Deputatsky (Russian: Депута́тский; masculine), Deputatskaya (Депута́тская; feminine), or Deputatskoye (Депута́тское; neuter) is the name of several inhabited localities in Russia.

Urban localities

- Deputatsky, an urban-type settlement in Ust-Yansky District of the Sakha Republic

Rural localities

- Deputatsky, Chelyabinsk Oblast, a settlement in Yemanzhelinsky Selsoviet of Yetkulsky District of Chelyabinsk Oblast
