= Selennyakh (river) =

Selennyakh Yakut: Силээннээх
- Location in the Sakha Republic, Russia

Location
- Country: Russia

Physical characteristics
- Source
  - location: Confluence of the Kharga-Salaa and Nyamnya rivers
  - coordinates: 69°28′40″N 137°40′34″E
  - elevation: 420 m (1,380 ft)
- Mouth: Indigirka
  - coordinates: 67°50′41″N 144°54′51″E
  - elevation: 29 m (95 ft)
- Length: 796 km (495 mi)
- Basin size: 30,800 km^{2} (11,900 sq mi)
- Discharge
  - average: 180 cubic metres per second (6,400 cu ft/s)

Basin features
- Progression: Indigirka→ East Siberian Sea

The Selennyakh (Russian: Селеннях; Yakut: Силээннээх, romanized: Sileenneex) is a river in Sakha Republic, Russia. It is a left tributary of the Indigirka.

The length of the river is 796 kilometres (495 mi). The area of its drainage basin is 30,800 square kilometres (11,900 mi^{2}).

== Course ==
It originates in the north-west of the Chersky Range. The river flows southeastwards through the Moma-Selennyakh Depression which is bound in this area by the Burkat and Khadaranya ranges, and in the east by the Selennyakh Range, then the river flows across the Ust-Yansky District, where Sayylyk, the only inhabited place of its basin is found.

In its middle course the Selennyakh makes a wide bend northeastwards and then flows across the Aby Lowland in a roughly eastern direction until it reaches the left bank of the Indigirka. The Selennyakh is frozen between October and May.

According to the State Water Register of Russia, it is a part of the Lena basin district. The average annual discharge in the mouth is 180 cubic metres per second (6,400 cu ft/s).

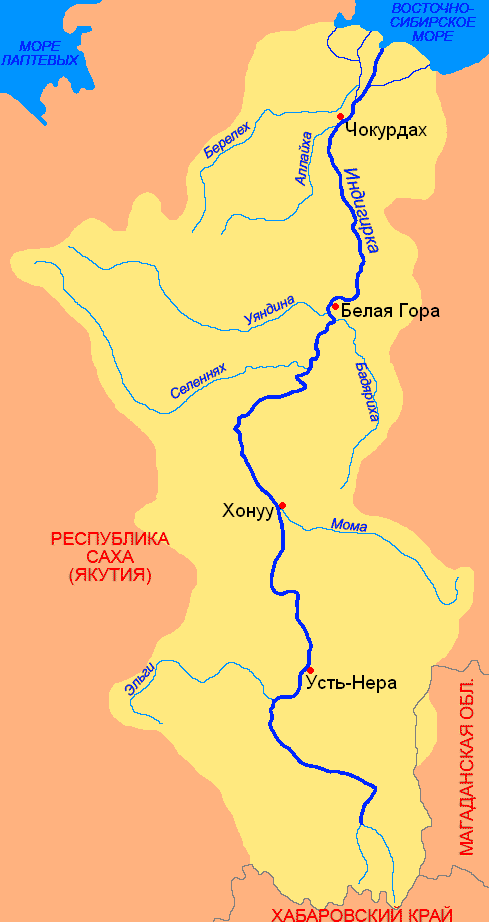
Basin of the Indigirka
