= Namy =

Namy Намы
- Selo

Other transcription(s)
  - Yakut: Намыы
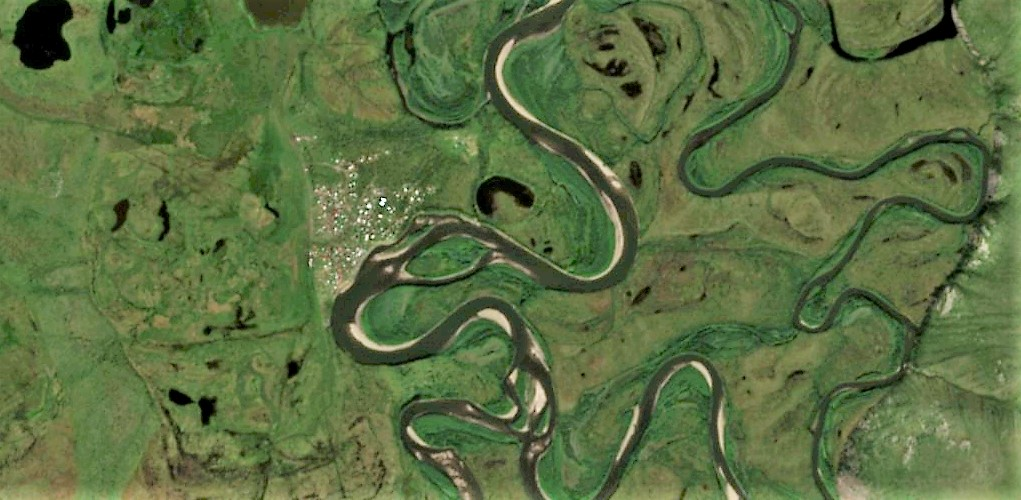
- Sentinel-2 image
- Interactive map of Namy
- Location of Namy Namy (Sakha Republic)
- Coordinates: 69°31′N 132°15′E
- Country: Russia
- Federal subject: Sakha Republic
- Administrative district: Bulunsky District
- Rural okrugSelsoviet: Borogonsky Rural Okrug
- Founded: 1925

Population (2010 Census)
  - Total: 526
  - Estimate (January 2016): 503 (−4.4%)

Administrative status
  - Capital of: Borogonsky Rural Okrug

Municipal status
  - Municipal district: Bulunsky Municipal District
  - Rural settlement: Borogonsky Rural Settlement
  - Capital of: Borogonsky Rural Settlement
- Time zone: UTC+
- Postal code: 678411
- OKTMO ID: 98612407101

Namy (Russian: Намы; Yakut: Намыы, romanized: Namıı) is a rural locality (a selo), the only inhabited locality, and the administrative center of Borogonsky Rural Okrug of Bulunsky District in the Sakha Republic, Russia, located 280 kilometers (170 mi) from Tiksi, the administrative center of the district. Its population as of the 2010 Census was 526, up from 488 recorded during the 2002 Census. Philologist Zoya Basharina is a native of the okrug.

== Geography ==
The village is located north of the Arctic Circle, on the left bank of the Omoloy, upstream of the mouth of the Kuranakh-Yuryakh.

== Climate ==
Namy has a Subarctic or Boreal (taiga) climate (Dfd).

Climate data for Namy
Month	Jan	Feb	Mar	Apr	May	Jun	Jul	Aug	Sep	Oct	Nov	Dec	Year
Record high °C (°F)	4 (39)	5 (41)	0 (32)	14.8 (58.6)	27 (81)	32.6 (90.7)	31.5 (88.7)	30.9 (87.6)	14.4 (57.9)	6.3 (43.3)	−7 (19)	8 (46)	14.4 (57.9)
Mean daily maximum °C (°F)	−37.9 (−36.2)	−34.6 (−30.3)	−22.9 (−9.2)	−8.9 (16.0)	2.2 (36.0)	13.7 (56.7)	16.3 (61.3)	13.6 (56.5)	5.2 (41.4)	−11.8 (10.8)	−32.1 (−25.8)	−34.2 (−29.6)	−11 (12)
Mean daily minimum °C (°F)	−42.8 (−45.0)	−42.5 (−44.5)	−35.9 (−32.6)	−24 (−11)	−6.8 (19.8)	4.7 (40.5)	6.8 (44.2)	4 (39)	−2.2 (28.0)	−19 (−2)	−36.9 (−34.4)	−39.3 (−38.7)	−19.5 (−3.1)
Record low °C (°F)	−60.5 (−76.9)	−60 (−76)	−53 (−63)	−47.2 (−53.0)	−27.2 (−17.0)	−5.6 (21.9)	−3 (27)	−5 (23)	−16.5 (2.3)	−40 (−40)	−53 (−63)	−59 (−74)	−60.5 (−76.9)
Average rainfall mm (inches)	6 (0.2)	3 (0.1)	9 (0.4)	3 (0.1)	12 (0.5)	18 (0.7)	24 (0.9)	27 (1.1)	21 (0.8)	9 (0.4)	15 (0.6)	9 (0.4)	156 (6.1)
Average snowy days	20	16	14	10	11	2	0	1	9	20	18	21	142
