= Arga-Yuryakh =

River in Yakutia, Russia

Arga-Yuryakh Арга-Юрях / Арҕаа Үрэх
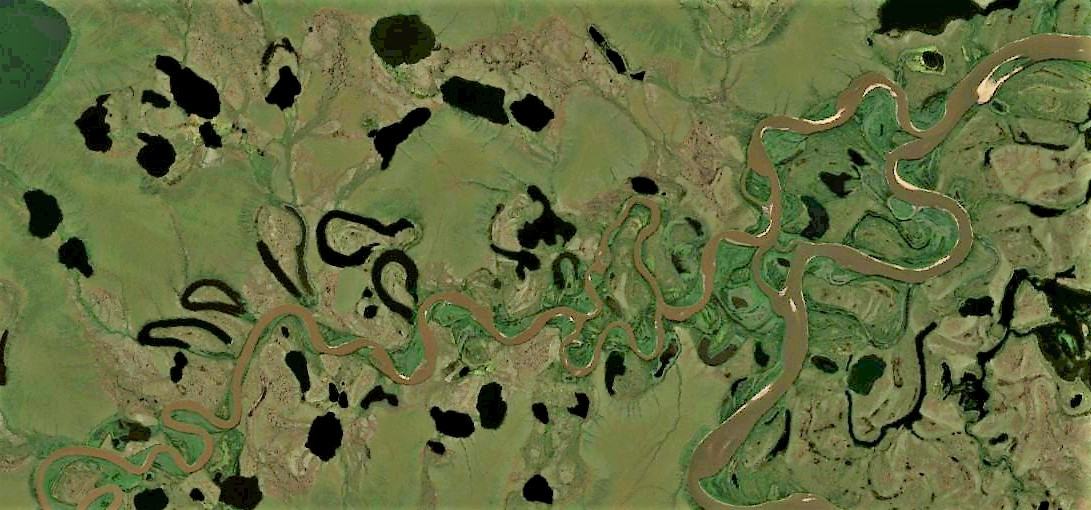
- Last stretch of the Arga-Yuryakh Sentinel-2 image

- Mouth location in Yakutia, Russia

Location
- Country: Russia

Physical characteristics
- Source
  - location: Orulgan Range; Verkhoyansk Range
  - coordinates: 69°49′31″N 130°20′48″E
  - elevation: 253 m (830 ft)
- Mouth: Omoloy
  - coordinates: 70°26′28″N 132°58′39″E
- Length: 214 km (133 mi) (279 km (173 mi))
- Basin size: 5,530 km^{2} (2,140 sq mi)

Basin features
- Progression: Omoloy → Laptev Sea

The Arga-Yuryakh (Russian: Арга-Юрях; Yakut: Арҕаа Үрэх, Arğaa Ürex) is a river in Sakha Republic (Yakutia), Russia. It is one of the major tributaries of the Omoloy. The river has a length of 214 kilometres (133 mi) and a drainage basin area of 5,530 square kilometres (2,140 mi^{2}).

The river flows north of the Arctic Circle, across desolate tundra territories of the East Siberian Lowland. Its basin falls within Ust-Yansky and Bulunsky districts. The name of the river comes from the Yakut "Arğaa-ürex" (Арҕаа-үрэх), meaning "western river".

== Course ==
The Arga-Yuryakh is a left tributary of the Omoloy. It has its sources at the confluence of the 50 km (31 mi) long Mundukan and the 38 km (24 mi) long Khadarynnya in the eastern slopes of the Orulgan Range of the Verkhoyansk Range system. The river flows roughly in an ENE direction and when it descends into the East Siberian Lowland, it bends and heads in a NNE direction until the end of its course. In its last stretch the river flows roughly parallel to the Omoloy further east, meandering in the floodplain. Finally the Arga-Yuryakh bends to the east and joins the left bank of the Omoloy 190 km (120 mi) from its mouth. The confluence is 89 km (55 mi) downstream of the mouth of the Kuranakh-Yuryakh.

=== Tributaries ===
The main tributaries of the Arga-Yuryakh are the 25 km (16 mi) long Ulakhan-Kieng-Appa on the right, as well as the 85 km (53 mi) long Turkulaakh, the 63 km (39 mi) long Tonguulaakh, the 43 km (27 mi) long Alyy-Yurege, the 29 km (18 mi) long Omukchaan, the 98 km (61 mi) long Yullyugen and the 64 km (40 mi) long Mas-Khayippyt on the left. The river is frozen between early October and early June. There are more than 1,500 lakes in its basin.

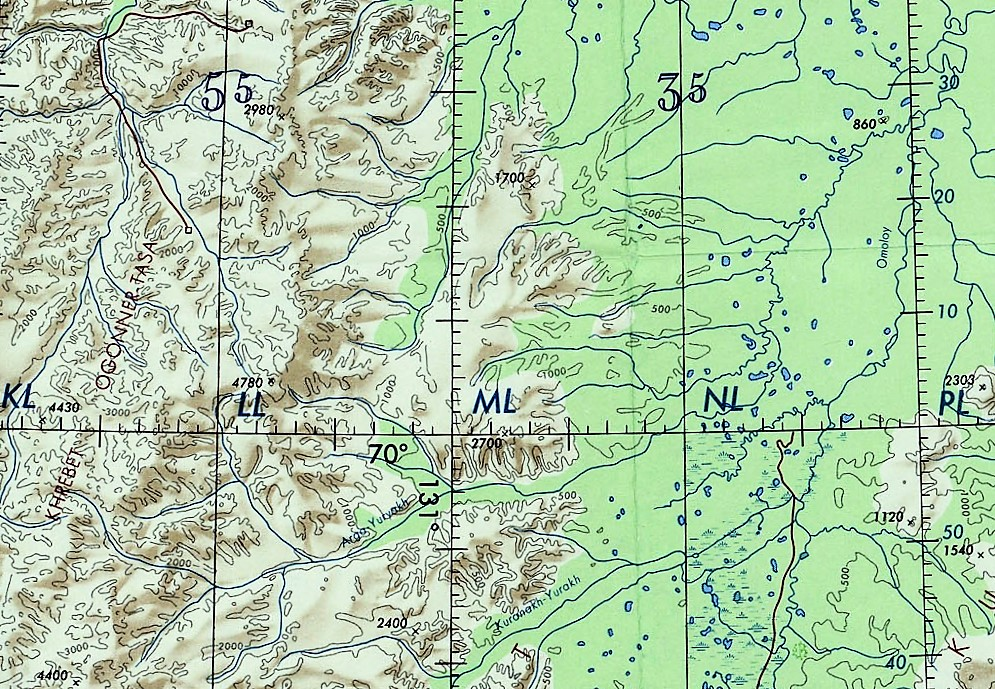
Course of the Arga-Yuryakh ONC map section.

== See also ==
- List of rivers of Russia
