= Buor-Yuryakh (Chondon) =

River in Yakutia, Russia

Buor-Yuryakh Буор-Юрях / Буор-Үрэх
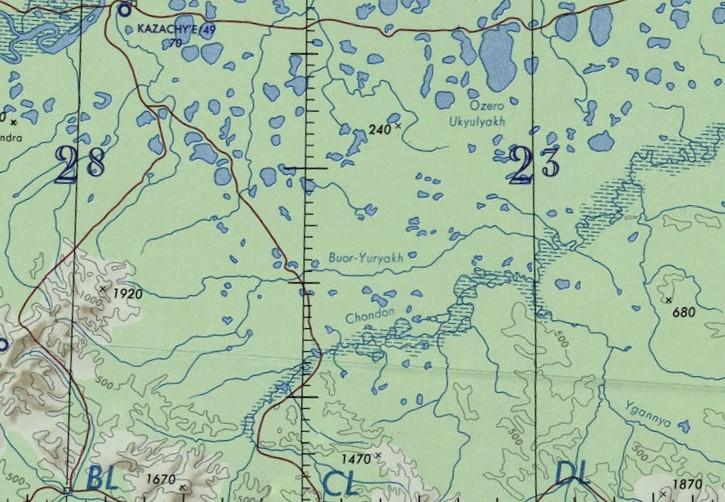
- Buor-Yuryakh course ONC map section

- Mouth location in Yakutia, Russia

Location
- Country: Russia

Physical characteristics
- Source
  - location: Kyundyulyun
  - coordinates: 70°17′00″N 135°59′55″E
  - elevation: 198 metres (650 ft)
- Mouth: Chondon
  - coordinates: 70°23′52″N 138°00′13″E
  - elevation: 12 metres (39 ft)
- Length: 170 km (110 mi)
- Basin size: 1,040 km^{2} (400 sq mi)

Basin features
- Progression: Chondon → Laptev Sea

The Buor-Yuryakh (Russian: Буор-Юрях; Yakut: Буор-Үрэх, Buor-Ürex) is a river in the Sakha Republic (Yakutia), Russia. It is the second largest tributary of the Chondon. The river has a length of 170 kilometres (110 mi) and a drainage basin area of 1,040 square kilometres (400 mi^{2}).

The Buor-Yuryakh flows north of the Arctic Circle, across desolate territories of the Ust-Yansky District. The name of the river comes from the Yakut "Буор Үрэх" "Buor" = earth, clay / "Yurekh" = river.

== Course ==
The Buor-Yuryakh is a left tributary of the Chondon. It has its sources in the northeastern slopes of the Kyundyulyun at the feet of 534 metres (1,752 ft) high Gory Krest mountain. The river flows roughly eastwards across a floodplain among numerous lakes forming meanders all along its course. Finally the Buor-Yuryakh joins the Chondon 354 km (220 mi) from its mouth.

=== Tributaries ===
The main tributary of the Buor-Yuryakh is the 36 km (22 mi) long Sakhsyr-Yuryege (Сахсыр-Юрэгэ) that joins its left bank 112 km (70 mi) before the confluence with the Chondon. There are more than 400 lakes in the river basin with a total area of 34 square kilometres (13 mi^{2}). The Buor-Yuryakh is frozen between the end of September and early June.

== See also ==
- List of rivers of Russia
