= Ust-Yansk =

Ust-Yansk Усть-Янск Усуйаана (Sakha)
- Selo
- Interactive map of Ust-Yansk
- Location of Ust-Yansk Ust-Yansk (Sakha Republic)
- Coordinates: 70°55′N 136°26′E
- Country: Russia
- Federal subject: Sakha Republic
- Administrative district: Ust-Yansky District
- Rural okrugSelsoviet: Ust-Yansky Rural Okrug
- Founded: 1780

Population (2010 Census)
  - Total: 317
  - Estimate (2021): 257 (−18.9%)

Administrative status
  - Capital of: Ust-Yansky Rural Okrug

Municipal status
  - Municipal district: Ust-Yansky Municipal District
  - Rural settlement: Ust-Yansky Rural Settlement
  - Capital of: Ust-Yansky Rural Settlement
- Time zone: UTC+
- Postal code: 678563
- OKTMO ID: 98656425101

Ust-Yansk (Russian: Усть-Янск; Yakut: Усуйаана, Usuyaana) is a rural locality (a selo), the only inhabited locality, and the administrative center of Ust-Yansky Rural Okrug of Ust-Yansky District in the Sakha Republic, Russia, located 486 kilometers (302 mi) from Deputatsky, the administrative center of the district. Its population as of the 2010 Census was 317, down from 341 recorded during the 2002 Census.
