= Dzhargalakh =

Dzhargalakh Джаргалах
- Selo

Other transcription(s)
  - Yakut: Дьарҕаалаах
- Interactive map of Dzhargalakh
- Location of Dzhargalakh Dzhargalakh (Sakha Republic)
- Coordinates: 67°16′21″N 130°32′30″E
- Country: Russia
- Federal subject: Sakha Republic
- Administrative district: Eveno-Bytantaysky National District
- Rural okrugSelsoviet: Verkhnebytantaysky Rural Okrug

Population (2010 Census)
  - Total: 269
  - Estimate (2021): 237 (−11.9%)

Administrative status
  - Capital of: Verkhnebytantaysky Rural Okrug

Municipal status
  - Municipal district: Eveno-Bytantaysky Municipal District
  - Rural settlement: Verkhnebytantaysky Rural Settlement
  - Capital of: Verkhnebytantaysky Rural Settlement
- Time zone: UTC+
- Postal code: 678585
- OKTMO ID: 98659405101

Dzhargalakh (Russian: Джаргалах; Yakut: Дьарҕаалаах, Carğaalaax) is a rural locality (a selo), the only inhabited locality, and the administrative center of Verkhnebytantaysky Rural Okrug of Eveno-Bytantaysky National District in the Sakha Republic, Russia, located 75 kilometers (47 mi) from Batagay-Alyta, the administrative center of the district. Its population as of the 2010 Census was 269, down from 285 recorded during the 2002 Census.
