= Sayylyk, Ust-Yansky District, Sakha Republic =

Sayylyk Сайылык Сайылык (Sakha)
- Selo
- Interactive map of Sayylyk
- Location of Sayylyk Sayylyk (Sakha Republic)
- Coordinates: 68°58′N 138°24′E
- Country: Russia
- Federal subject: Sakha Republic
- Administrative district: Ust-Yansky District
- Rural okrugSelsoviet: Silyannyakhsky Rural Okrug

Population (2010 Census)
  - Total: 771
  - Estimate (2021): 550 (−28.7%)

Administrative status
  - Capital of: Silyannyakhsky Rural Okrug

Municipal status
  - Municipal district: Ust-Yansky Municipal District
  - Rural settlement: Silyannyakhsky Rural Settlement
  - Capital of: Silyannyakhsky Rural Settlement
- Time zone: UTC+
- Postal code: 678552
- OKTMO ID: 98656415101

Sayylyk (Russian: Сайылык; Yakut: Сайылык, Sayılık) is a rural locality (a selo), the only inhabited locality, and the administrative center of Silyannyakhsky Rural Okrug of Ust-Yansky District in the Sakha Republic, Russia, located 120 kilometers (75 mi) from Deputatsky, the administrative center of the district. Its population as of the 2010 Census was 771, down from 960 recorded during the 2002 Census.

It is the only inhabited place by the Selennyakh River.
