= Yukagir =

Yukagir Юкагир Дьүкээгир (Sakha)
- Selo
- Interactive map of Yukagir
- Location of Yukagir Yukagir (Sakha Republic)
- Coordinates: 71°45′00″N 139°53′00″E
- Country: Russia
- Federal subject: Sakha Republic
- Administrative district: Ust-Yansky District
- Rural okrugSelsoviet: Yukagirsky National (Nomadic) Rural Okrug
- Elevation: 1 m (3.3 ft)

Population (2010 Census)
  - Total: 154
  - Estimate (2021): 128 (−16.9%)

Administrative status
  - Capital of: Yukagirsky National (Nomadic) Rural Okrug

Municipal status
  - Municipal district: Ust-Yansky Municipal District
  - Rural settlement: Yukagirsky National (Nomadic) Rural Settlement
  - Capital of: Yukagirsky National (Nomadic) Rural Settlement
- Time zone: UTC+
- Postal code: 678560
- OKTMO ID: 98656435101

Yukagir (Russian: Юкагир; Yakut: Дьүкээгир, romanized: Cükeegir) is a rural locality (a selo), the only inhabited locality and the administrative center of Yukagirsky National (Nomadic) Rural Okrug of Ust-Yansky District in the Sakha Republic, Russia, located 798 kilometers (496 mi) from Deputatsky, the administrative center of the district. Its population as of the 2010 Census was 154, of whom 84 were male and 70 female, up from 106 recorded during the 2002 Census. The village shares its name with the Yukaghir people who are indigenous to this region.
