= Kustur =

Kustur Кустур Кустуур (Sakha)
- Selo
- Interactive map of Kustur
- Location of Kustur Kustur (Sakha Republic)
- Coordinates: 68°11′N 131°41′E
- Country: Russia
- Federal subject: Sakha Republic
- Administrative district: Eveno-Bytantaysky National District
- Rural okrugSelsoviet: Nizhnebytantaysky Rural Okrug

Population (2010 Census)
  - Total: 766
  - Estimate (2021): 723 (−5.6%)

Administrative status
  - Capital of: Nizhnebytantaysky Rural Okrug

Municipal status
  - Municipal district: Eveno-Bytantaysky Municipal District
  - Rural settlement: Nizhnebytantaysky Rural Settlement
  - Capital of: Nizhnebytantaysky Rural Settlement
- Time zone: UTC+
- Postal code: 678586
- OKTMO ID: 98659415101

Kustur (Russian: Кустур; Yakut: Кустуур, Kustuur) is a rural locality (a selo) and the administrative center of Nizhnebytantaysky Rural Okrug in Eveno-Bytantaysky National District of the Sakha Republic, Russia, located 100 kilometers (62 mi) from Batagay-Alyta, the administrative center of the district. Its population as of the 2010 Census was 766, up from 754 recorded during the 2002 Census.
