= Uyandi =

Uyandi Уяндино
- Selo

Other transcription(s)
  - Sakha: Уйаандьы
- Interactive map of Uyandi
- Location of Uyandi Uyandi (Sakha Republic)
- Coordinates: 69°19′N 140°56′E
- Country: Russia
- Federal subject: Sakha Republic
- Administrative district: Ust-Yansky District
- Rural okrugSelsoviet: Uyandinsky Rural Okrug

Population (2010 Census)
  - Total: 154
  - Estimate (2021): 142 (−7.8%)

Administrative status
  - Capital of: Uyandinsky Rural Okrug

Municipal status
  - Municipal district: Ust-Yansky Municipal District
  - Rural settlement: Uyandinsky Rural Settlement
  - Capital of: Uyandinsky Rural Settlement
- Postal code: 678540

Uyandi (Russian: Уяндино; Yakut: Уйаандьы, romanized: Uyaancı) is a rural locality (a selo), the only inhabited locality, and the administrative center of Uyandinsky Rural Okrug of Ust-Yansky District in the Sakha Republic, Russia, located 60 kilometers (37 mi) from Deputatsky, the administrative center of the district. Its population as of the 2010 Census was 154, up from 105 recorded during the 2002 Census.
