= Kuranakh-Yuryakh =

River in Russia

Kuranakh-Yuryakh Куранах-Юрях / Кураанах Үрэх
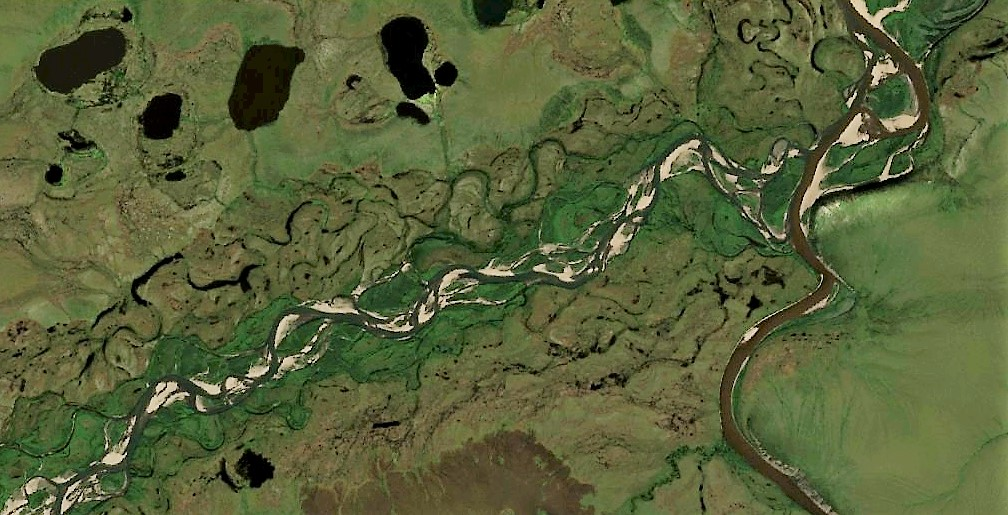
- Last stretch of the Kuranakh-Yuryakh Sentinel-2 image.

- Mouth location in Yakutia, Russia

Location
- Country: Russia

Physical characteristics
- Source
  - location: Orulgan Range; Verkhoyansk Range
- Mouth: Omoloy
  - coordinates: 69°54′34″N 132°29′28″E
- Length: 203 km (126 mi) (279 km (173 mi))
- Basin size: 7,520 km^{2} (2,900 sq mi)

Basin features
- Progression: Omoloy → Laptev Sea

The Kuranakh-Yuryakh (Russian: Куранах-Юрях or Кураанах-Юрэх; Yakut: Кураанах Үрэх, Kuraanax Ürex) is a river in Sakha Republic (Yakutia), Russia. It is one of the major tributaries of the Omoloy. The river has a length of 203 kilometres (126 mi) —279 km (173 mi) together with the Nyolu— and a drainage basin area of 7,520 square kilometres (2,900 mi^{2}). The lower stretch of its course is also known as Altan.

The Kuranakh-Yuryakh flows north of the Arctic Circle, across desolate tundra territories of the East Siberian Lowland. Its basin falls within Ust-Yansky and Bulunsky districts.

== Course ==
The Kuranakh-Yuryakh is a left tributary of the Omoloy. It has its sources in the eastern slopes of the Orulgan Range of the Verkhoyansk Range system. The river flows roughly northeastwards across mountainous terrain, bound in the east by the Sietinden Range, then it heads eastwards along a wide valley. As it descends into the floodplain of the East Siberian Lowland, it turns again in a northeastern direction, flowing slowly among lakes and dividing into a tangle of river channels. Finally the Kuranakh-Yuryakh joins the left bank of the Omoloy 279 km (173 mi) from its mouth. The confluence is 89 km (55 mi) upstream of the mouth of the Arga-Yuryakh. The nearest inhabited place is Namy, located upstream from its mouth in the Omoloy.

=== Tributaries ===
The main tributaries of the Kuranakh-Yuryakh are the 77 km (48 mi) long Nyolu and the 88 km (55 mi) Seimchan on the right, as well as the 48 km (30 mi) long Kuobakhchan and the 46 km (29 mi) long Ystannakh on the left. The river is frozen between early October and early June. There are more than thousand lakes in its basin.

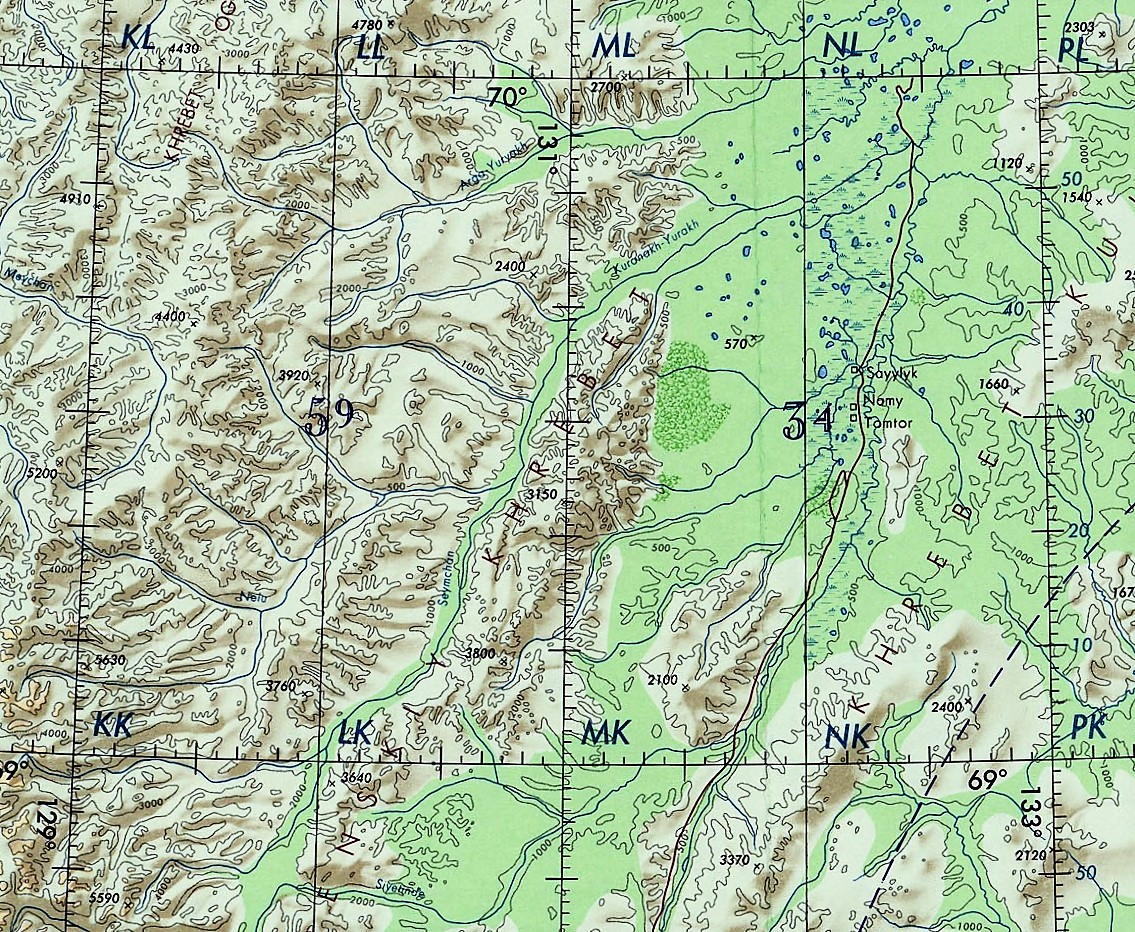
Course of the Kuranakh-Yuryakh ONC map section.

== See also ==
- Braided river
- List of rivers of Russia
