= Nizhneyansk =

Nizhneyansk Нижнеянск
- Urban-type settlement

Other transcription(s)
  - Yakut: Нижнеянскай
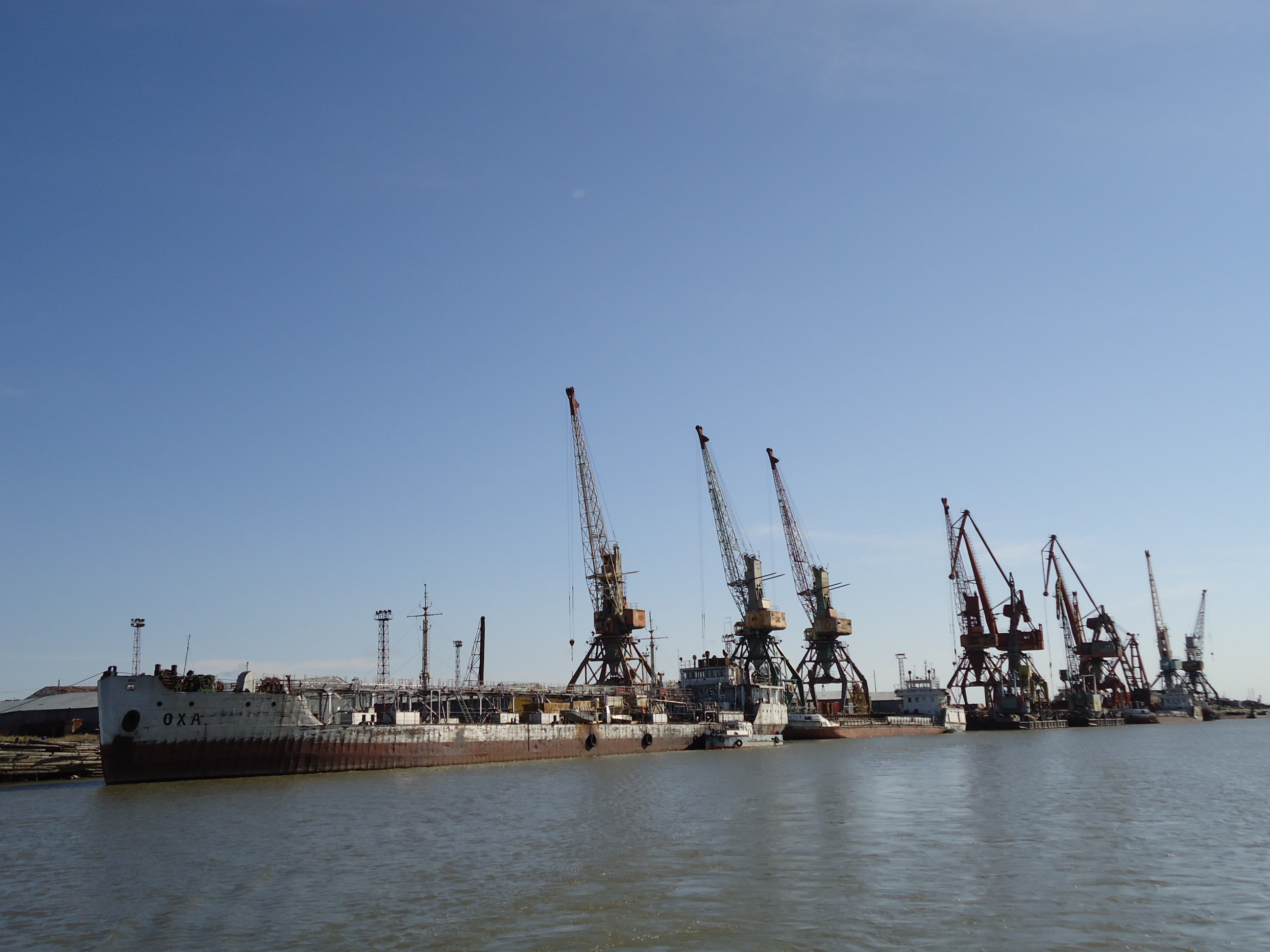
- Interactive map of Nizhneyansk
- Location of Nizhneyansk Nizhneyansk (Sakha Republic)
- Coordinates: 71°26′N 136°04′E
- Country: Russia
- Federal subject: Sakha Republic
- Administrative district: Ust-Yansky District
- SettlementSelsoviet: Settlement of Nizhneyansk
- Founded: 1940s
- Urban-type settlement status since: 1958

Population (2010 Census)
  - Total: 391
  - Estimate (2023): 207 (−47.1%)

Administrative status
  - Capital of: Settlement of Nizhneyansk

Municipal status
  - Municipal district: Ust-Yansky Municipal District
  - Urban settlement: Nizhneyansk Urban Settlement
  - Capital of: Nizhneyansk Urban Settlement
- Time zone: UTC+
- Postal code: 678562
- Dialing code: +7 841166
- OKTMO ID: 98656159051

Nizhneyansk population
- 2010 Census: 391
- 2002 Census: 701
- 1989 Census: 2,502
- 1979 Census: 2,164

Nizhneyansk (Russian: Нижнея́нск; Yakut: Нижнеянскай, romanized: Nijneyanskay) is an urban locality (an urban-type settlement) in Ust-Yansky District of the Sakha Republic, Russia, located 602 kilometers (374 mi) from Deputatsky, the administrative center of the district, in the Yana River delta. As of the 2010 Census, its population was 391.

== History ==
It was founded in the 1940s and was granted urban-type settlement status in 1958.

== Administrative and municipal status ==
Within the framework of administrative divisions, the urban-type settlement of Nizhneyansk is incorporated within Ust-Yansky District as the Settlement of Nizhneyansk. As a municipal division, the Settlement of Nizhneyansk is incorporated within Ust-Yansky Municipal District as Nizhneyansk Urban Settlement.
