= Kyundyulyun =

Mountain range in Sakha Republic, Russia

- Кюндюлюн /Күндүлүн
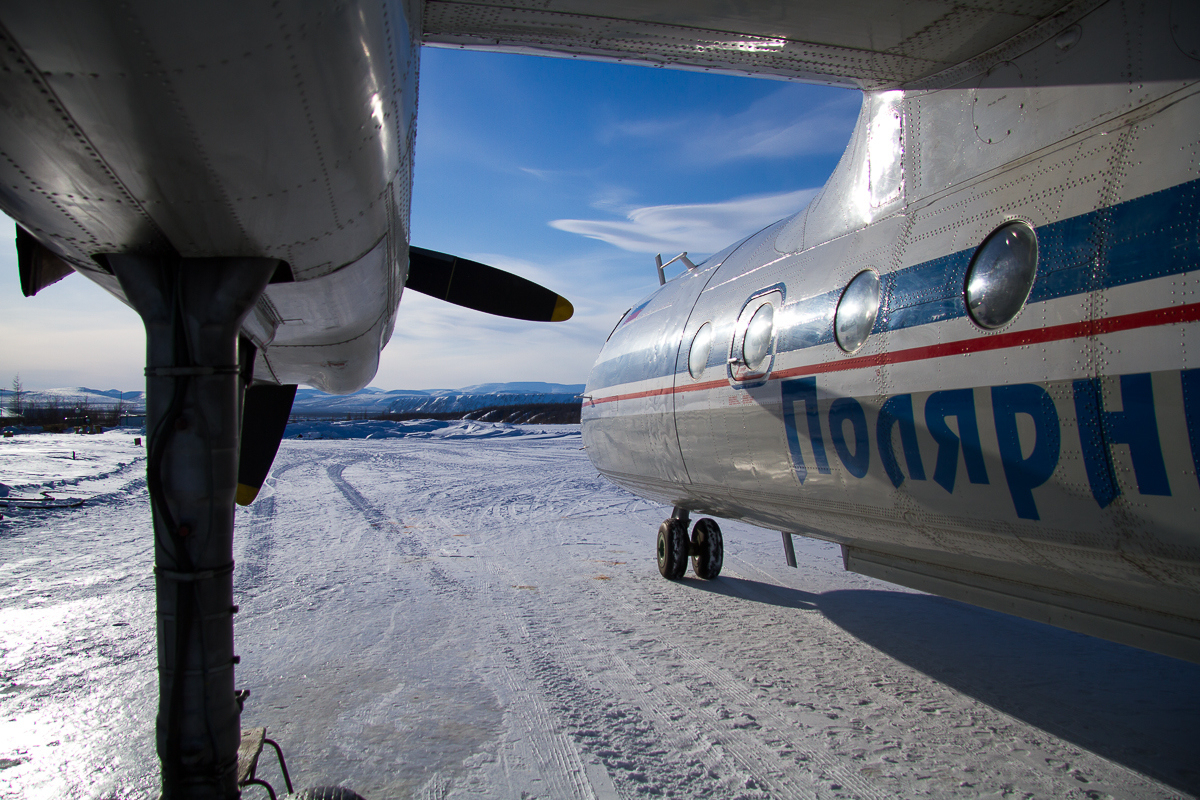
- View of the Kyundyulyun in the background at Ust-Kuyga Airport

Highest point
- Peak: Unnamed
- Elevation: 640 m (2,100 ft)

Dimensions
- Length: 100 km (62 mi) NE/SW
- Width: 70 km (43 mi) SE/NW

Geography
- Location within Sakha Republic
- Country: Russia
- Federal subject: Sakha Republic
- Range coordinates: 70°15′N 135°45′E
- Parent range: East Siberian System

Climbing
- Easiest route: From Ust-Kuyga

The Kyundyulyun (Russian: Кюндюлюн or Горы Кюндюлюн; Yakut: Күндүлүн, romanized: Kündülün) is a mountain range in the Sakha Republic, Far Eastern Federal District, Russia. The nearest airport is Ust-Kuyga Airport, located in Ust-Yansky District.

== Geography ==
The Kyundyulyun Range is located in northern Yakutia, about 400 kilometers (250 mi) north of the Arctic Circle. It is a smooth-looking range, rising above the right bank of the lower course of the Yana River. The Kyundyulyun forms a northeastern prolongation of the Kular Range, which extends from the southwest on the other side of the Yana, overlapping with the northern foothills of the Chersky Range that extend from the southeast. The highest point is an unnamed 640 metres (2,100 ft) high summit located in the southwestern part.

To the north and northeast the Kyundyulyun is limited by the Yana-Indigirka Lowland, part of the East Siberian Lowland. To the east and southeast the northern foothills of the Chersky Range extend southwards and to the west and south the winding Yana River forms the limit of the range. River Buor-Yuryakh, the main left tributary of the Chondon, has its sources in the range.

The Kyundyulyun area is practically uninhabited except for the town of Ust-Kuyga, located at the southwestern edge of the range on the eastern bank of the Yana River.

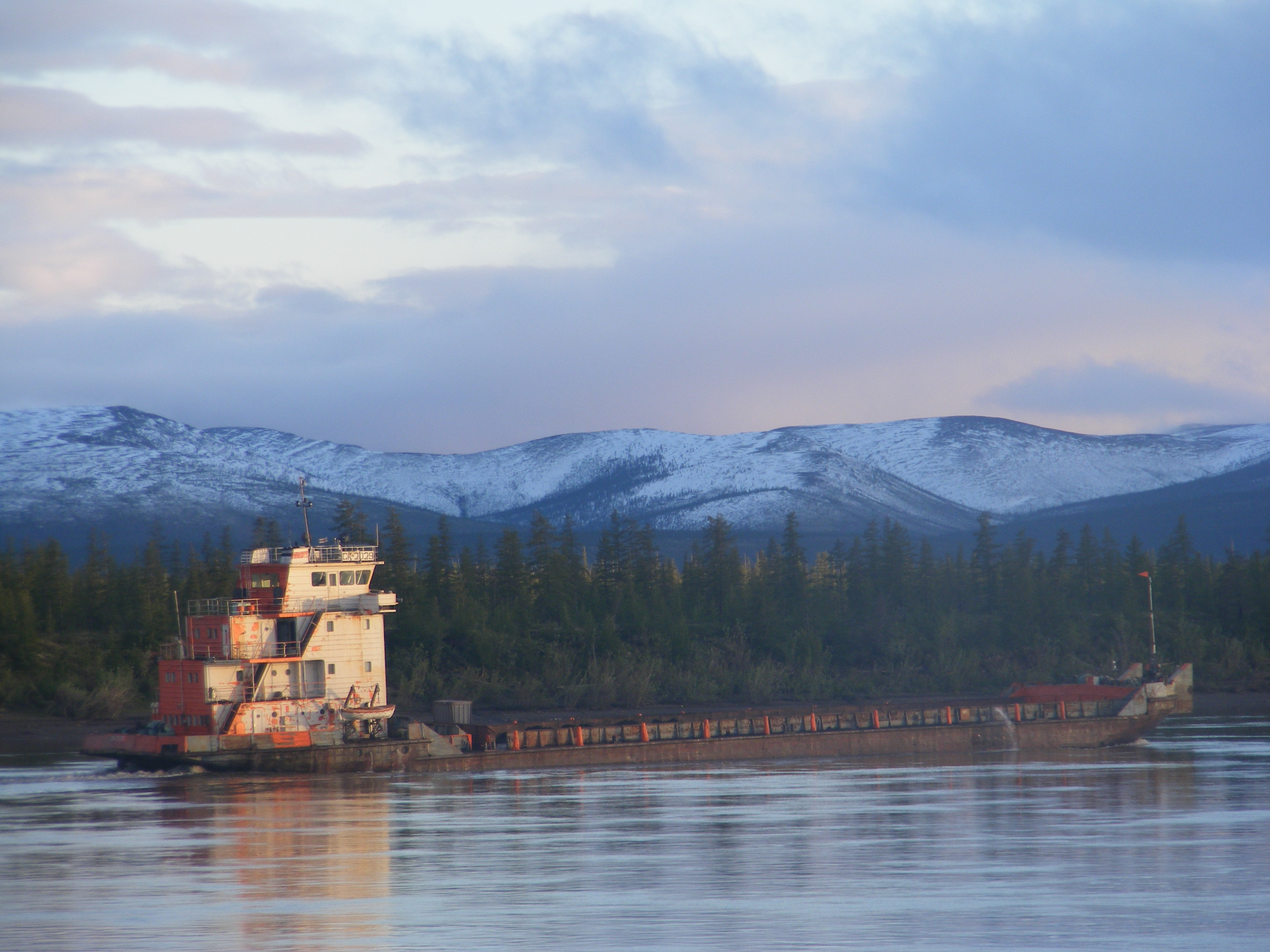
The Kyundyulyun rising above the Yana.

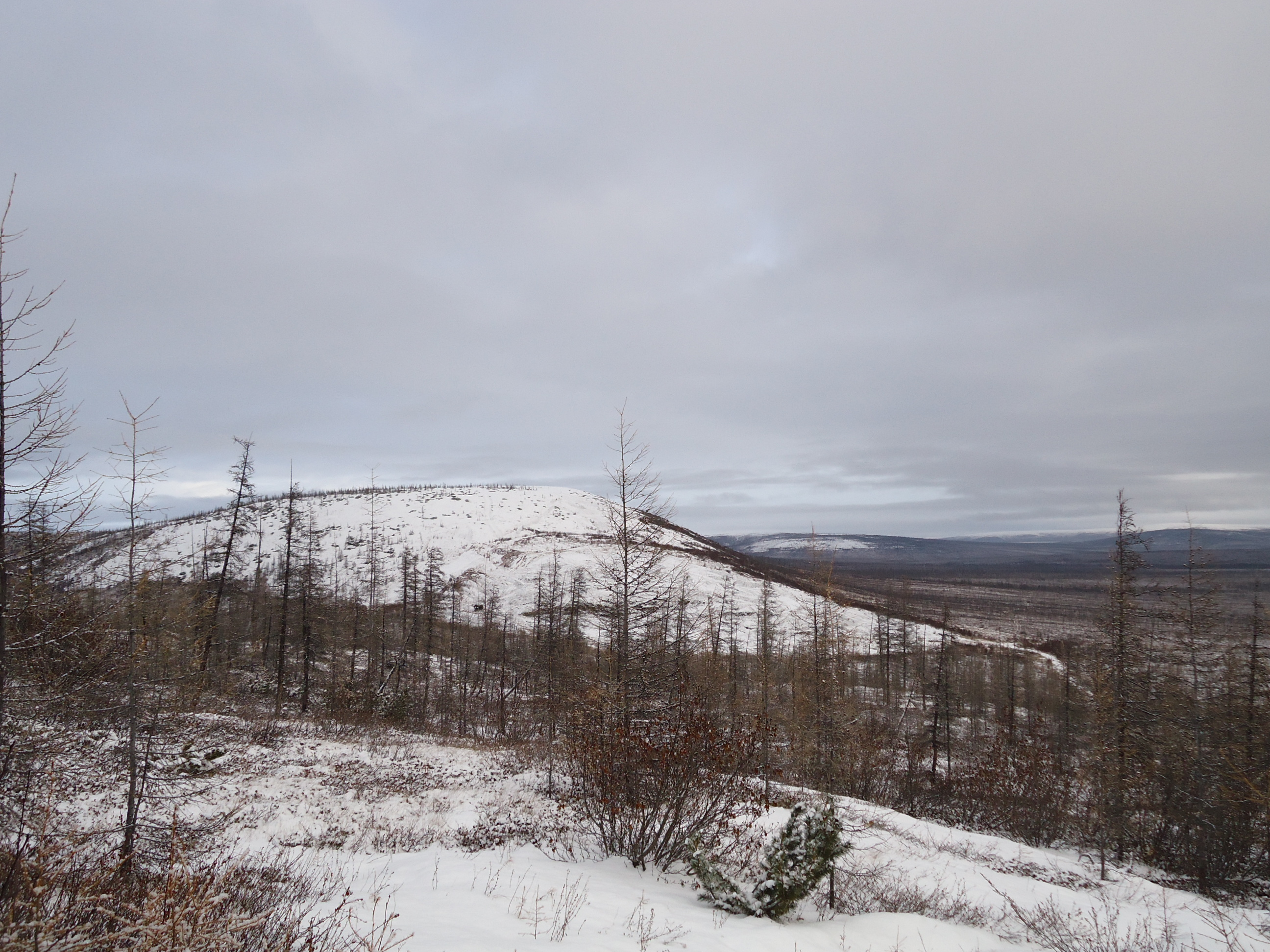
View of the Kyundyulyun taiga near Ust-Kuyga.

== Flora ==
Permafrost prevails in the area of the Kyundyulyun owing to the northerly location and the closeness of the Laptev Sea. The range looks quite barren, being mostly covered with tundra. There are forests of larch in the southern slopes and in some of the deeper and more protected valleys.

== Climate ==
The range has a harsh subarctic climate. The average temperature is −12 °C (10 °F). The coldest temperatures, down to −30 °C (−22 °F), have been recorded in February. In summer the average July temperature in the valleys does not exceed 14 °C (57 °F).
