= Sakkyryr Airport =

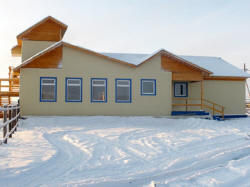
- IATA: SUK; ICAO: UEBS; LID: СКЫ

Summary
- Airport type: Public
- Serves: Batagay-Alyta, Eveno-Bytantaysky National District, Sakha Republic, Russia
- Elevation AMSL: 25 m / 82 ft
- Coordinates: 67°47′31″N 130°23′27″E
- Website: http://www.aerosever.ru/www/airports/air14/

Maps
- Sakha Republic in Russia

- Location of the airport in the Sakha Republic

Runways
Direction	Length		Surface
Direction	m	ft	Surface
12/30	1,200	3,937	Asphalt
- Sources: AeroSever, GCM, STV

Sakkyryr Airport (Russian: Аэропорт Саккырыр) (IATA: SUK, ICAO: UEBS) is an airport serving the urban locality of Batagay-Alyta, Eveno-Bytantaysky National District, in the Sakha Republic of Russia, along the Yana River. It has one unpaved runway 2000×60 m. It is operated by the Federal State Enterprise “Aeroporty Severa” (which is a branch of the enterprise). The airport terminal can accommodate 30 people.

== Airlines and destinations ==
Airlines	Destinations
Polar Airlines	Yakutsk

== See also ==
- List of airports in Russia
