= Ulakhan-Kyuegyulyur =

River in Yakutia, Russia

Ulakhan-Kyuegyulyur Улахан-Кюэгюлюр / Улахан Күөгүлүүр
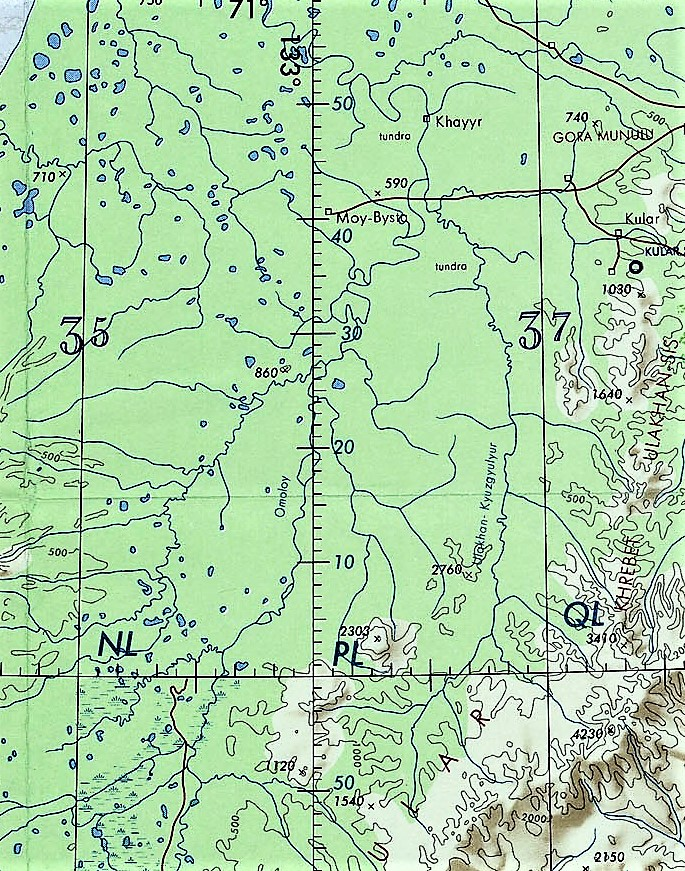
- Course of the Ulakhan-Kyuegyulyur ONC map section

- Mouth location in Yakutia, Russia

Location
- Country: Russia

Physical characteristics
- Source
  - location: Kular Range; Verkhoyansk Range
  - coordinates: 69°49′31″N 130°20′48″E
  - elevation: 253 m (830 ft)
- Mouth: Omoloy
  - coordinates: 70°43′01″N 133°29′48″E
- Length: 159 km (99 mi)
- Basin size: 3,630 km^{2} (1,400 sq mi)

Basin features
- Progression: Omoloy → Laptev Sea

The Ulakhan-Kyuegyulyur (Russian: Улахан-Кюэгюлюр; Yakut: Улахан Күөгүлүүр, Ulaxan Küögülüür) is a river in Sakha Republic (Yakutia), Russia. It is one of the major tributaries of the Omoloy. The river has a length of 159 kilometres (99 mi) and a drainage basin area of 3,630 square kilometres (1,400 mi^{2}).

The river flows north of the Arctic Circle, across desolate tundra territories of the East Siberian Lowland. Its basin falls within Ust-Yansky District.

== Course ==
The Ulakhan-Kyuegyulyur is the largest right tributary of the Omoloy. It has its sources in the western slopes of the Kular Range of the Verkhoyansk Range system. The river flows roughly in a NNE direction flanking the feet of the range. After it descends into the East Siberian Lowland, it heads in a northern direction until the end of its course. The river flows roughly parallel to the Omoloy further west, meandering in the floodplain. Finally the Ulakhan-Kyuegyulyur joins the right bank of the Omoloy 127 km (79 mi) from its mouth. The confluence is 12 km (7.5 mi) upstream of Khayyr village.

=== Tributaries ===
The main tributary of the Ulakhan-Kyuegyulyur is the 100 km (62 mi) long Kuchchuguy-Kyuegyulyur on the right. The river is frozen between mid October and early June. There are more than 780 small lakes in its basin with a total area of 22 square kilometres (8.5 mi^{2}).

== See also ==
- List of rivers of Russia
