= Khadaranya Range =

Mountain range in Russia

- Хадаранья / Хадаранньа
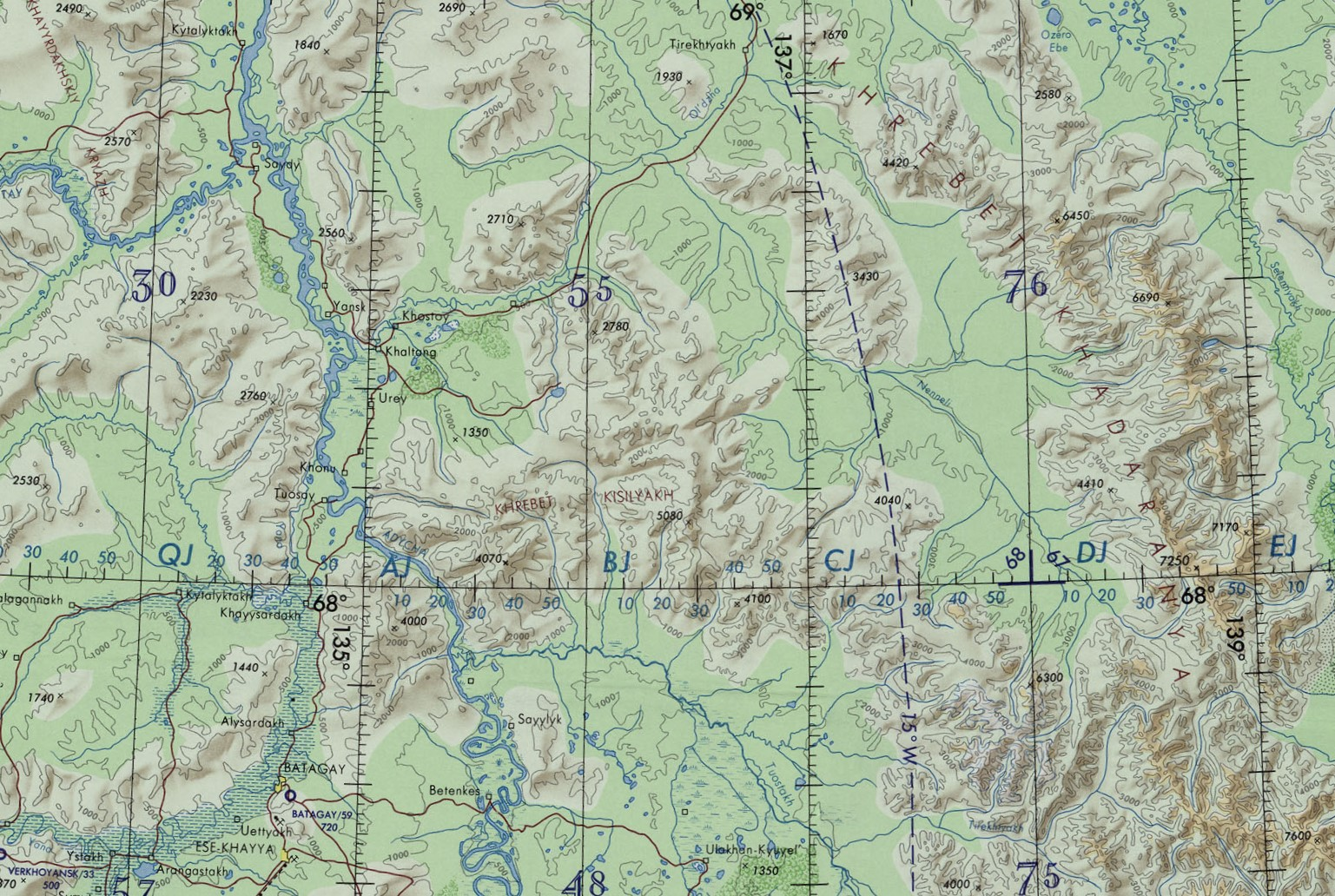
- Map section with the Khadaranya Range in the right

Highest point
- Peak: Unnamed
- Elevation: 2,185 m (7,169 ft)

Dimensions
- Length: 170 km (110 mi) NNW–SSE
- Width: 40 km (25 mi) WSW/ENE

Geography
- Location within Sakha Republic
- Country: Russia
- Federal subject: Sakha Republic
- Range coordinates: 68°27′N 138°00′E
- Parent range: Chersky Range, East Siberian System

Geology
- Orogeny: Alpine orogeny
- Rock type(s): Mudstone, clay and granite

Climbing
- Easiest route: From Batagay

The Khadaranya Range (Russian: Хадаранья; Yakut: Хадаранньа, romanized: Xadaranņa) is a mountain range in the Verkhoyansk District, Sakha Republic (Yakutia), Far Eastern Federal District, Russia. The nearest airfield is Batagay Airport.

== Geography ==
The Khadaranya Range rises in the northern sector of the Chersky Range, to the east of the lower course of the Yana River and to the west of the Moma-Selennyakh Depression where the Selennyakh river flows.

It stretches in a roughly NNW–SSE direction for about 170 kilometers (110 mi) with the Oldzho river to the north, beyond which rises the Burkat Range, and its tributary Nenneli to the west, beyond which rise the Kisilyakh and Kurundya ranges. The smaller Ymiysky Range (Ымыйский кряж) rises off the northwestern side, and the Tas-Khayakhtakh, one of the main subranges of the Chersky Mountains, rises off the southern end of the range. The highest peak is an unnamed 2,185 metres (7,169 ft) high summit.

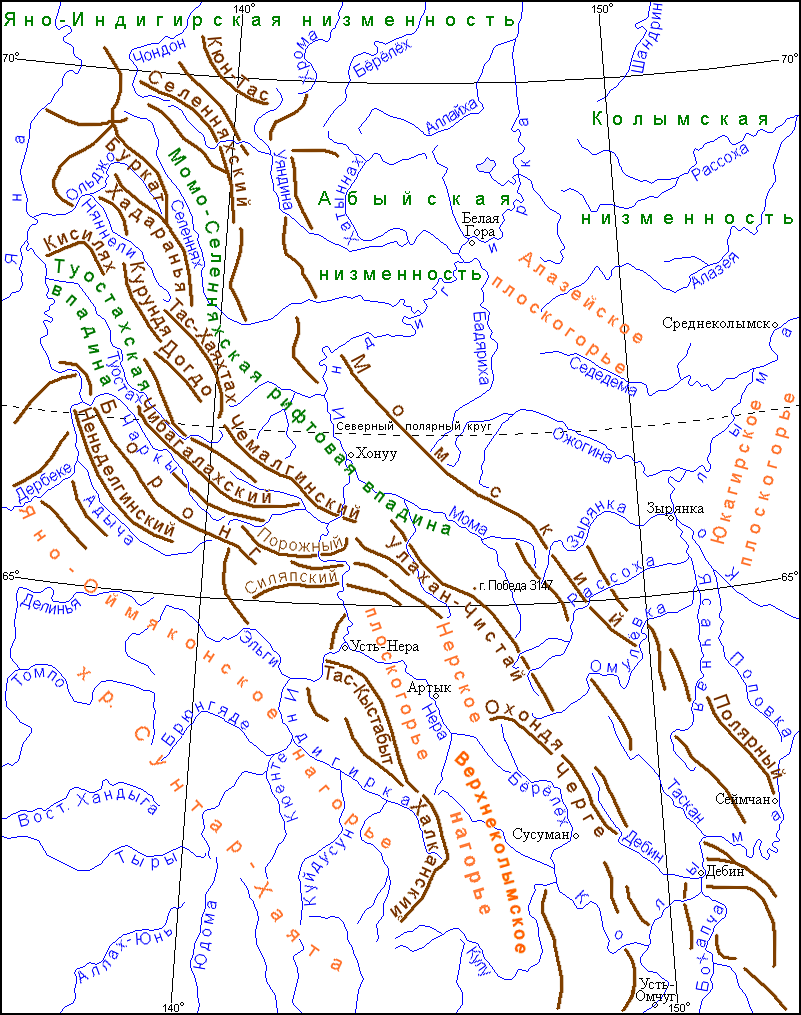
Schematic map of the Chersky System, with the Khadaranya roughly in the upper left.

== See also ==
- List of mountains and hills of Russia
