= Ust-Kuyga =

Ust-Kuyga Усть-Куйга
- Urban-type settlement

Other transcription(s)
  - Yakut: Уус Куйга
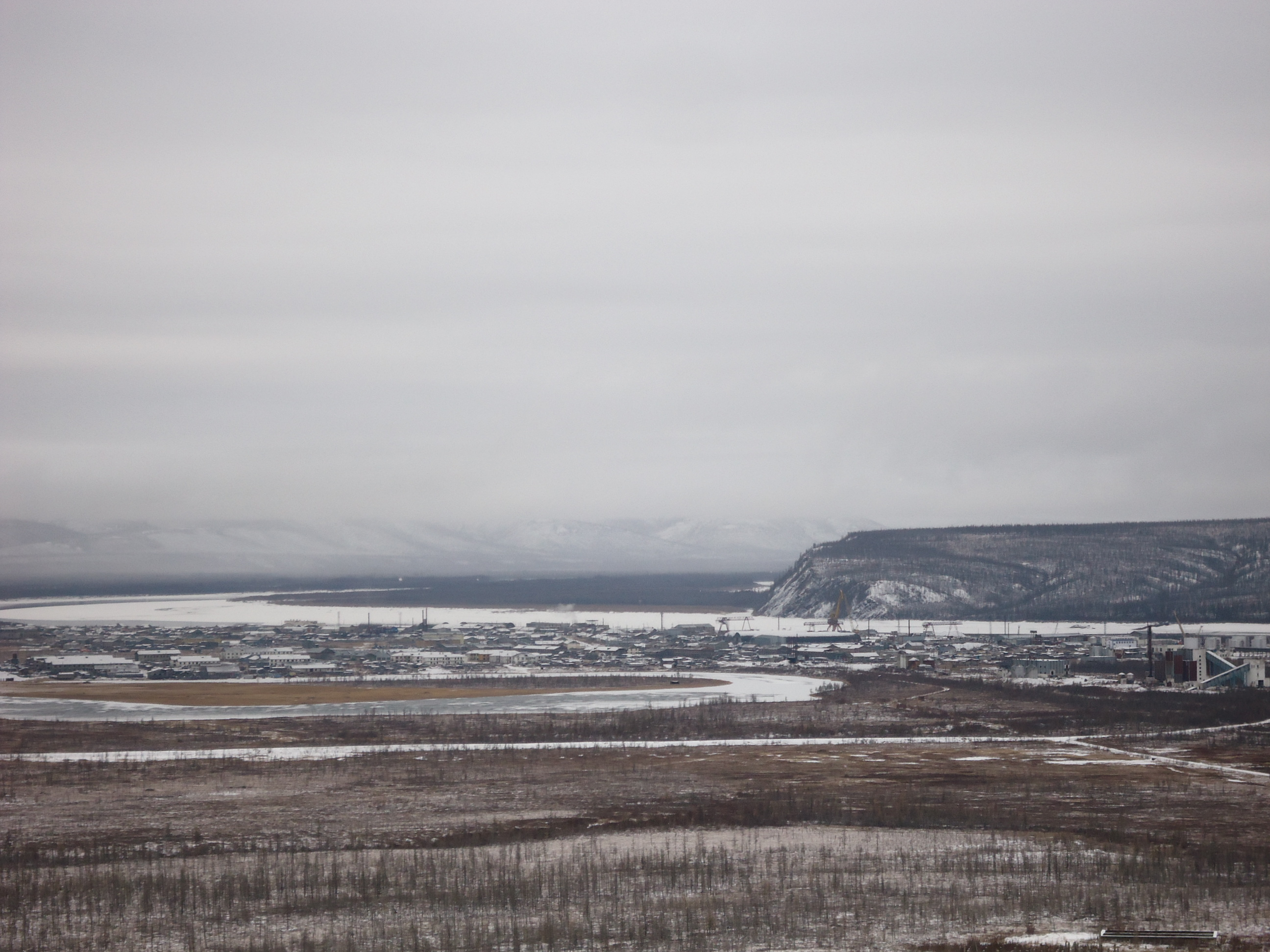
- Ust-Kuyga
- Interactive map of Ust-Kuyga
- Location of Ust-Kuyga Ust-Kuyga (Sakha Republic)
- Coordinates: 70°00′N 135°35′E
- Country: Russia
- Federal subject: Sakha Republic
- Administrative district: Ust-Yansky District
- SettlementSelsoviet: Ust-Kuyga
- Founded: 1956
- Urban-type settlement status since: 1967
- Elevation: 50 m (160 ft)

Population (2010 Census)
  - Total: 979
  - Estimate (2023): 680 (−30.5%)

Administrative status
  - Capital of: Settlement of Ust-Kuyga

Municipal status
  - Municipal district: Ust-Yansky Municipal District
  - Urban settlement: Ust-Kuyga Urban Settlement
  - Capital of: Ust-Kuyga Urban Settlement
- Time zone: UTC+
- Postal code: 678550
- OKTMO ID: 98656165051

Ust-Kuyga population
- 2010 Census: 979
- 2002 Census: 1,568
- 1989 Census: 5,342
- 1979 Census: 2,700

Ust-Kuyga (Russian: Усть-Куйга́; Yakut: Уус Куйга, romanized: Uus Kuyga) is an urban locality (an urban-type settlement) in Ust-Yansky District of the Sakha Republic, Russia. on the Yana River. As of the 2010 Census, its population was 979.

== Geography ==
The settlement is located by the Kyundyulyun mountains, 224 kilometers (139 mi) from Deputatsky, the administrative center of the district,

== History ==
Urban-type settlement status was granted to Ust-Kuyga in 1967.

== Administrative and municipal status ==
Within the framework of administrative divisions, the urban-type settlement of Ust-Kuyga is incorporated within Ust-Yansky District as the Settlement of Ust-Kuyga. As a municipal division, the Settlement of Ust-Kuyga is incorporated within Ust-Yansky Municipal District as Ust-Kuyga Urban Settlement.

== Transportation ==
Ust-Kuyga is served by the Ust-Kuyga Airport (IATA: UKG).
