= Ust-Kuyga Airport =

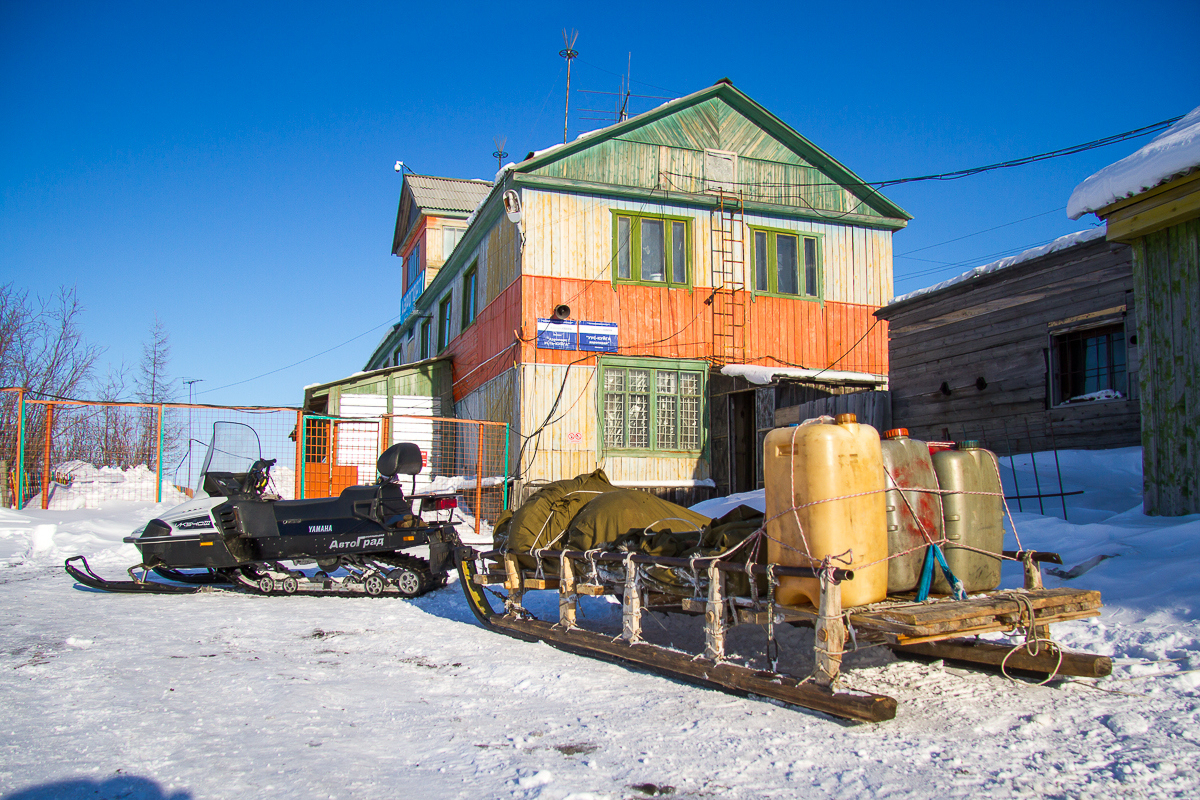
- Terminal and sled at Ust-Kuyga Airport
- IATA: UKG; ICAO: UEBT; LID: УКУ

Summary
- Airport type: Public
- Serves: Ust-Kuyga, Ust-Yansky District, Sakha Republic, Russia
- Elevation AMSL: 327 ft / 100 m
- Coordinates: 70°00′40″N 135°38′48″E

Maps
- Sakha Republic in Russia

- Location of the airport in the Sakha Republic

Runways
Direction	Length		Surface
Direction	m	ft	Surface
04/22	1,400	4,593	Asphalt
- Sources: GCM, STV

Ust-Kuyga Airport (Russian: Аэропорт Усть-Куйга) (IATA: UKG, ICAO: UEBT) is an airport serving the urban locality of Ust-Kuyga, Ust-Yansky District, in the Sakha Republic of Russia. It is located near the Arctic Circle.

== Airlines and destinations ==
Airlines	Destinations
Polar Airlines	Yakutsk

== See also ==
- List of airports in Russia
