= Ymiysky Range =

Mountain range in Russia

- Ымыйский кряж / Ымый томтороот
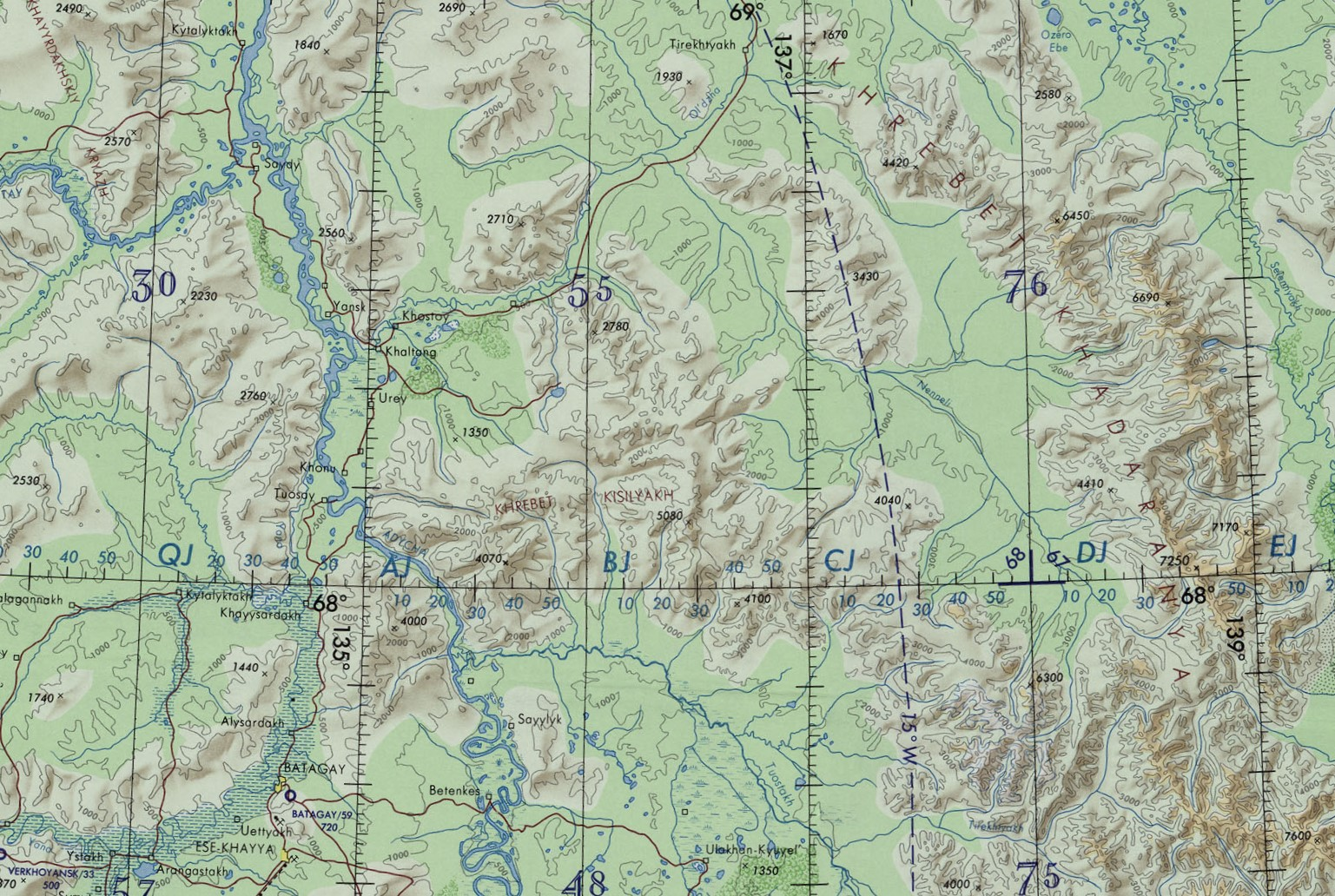
- ONC chart section with the Ymiysky Range in the upper right

Highest point
- Peak: Unnamed
- Elevation: 1,045.4 m (3,430 ft)

Dimensions
- Length: 50 km (31 mi) NW/SE
- Width: 20 km (12 mi) SW/NE

Geography
- Location within Sakha Republic
- Country: Russia
- Federal subject: Sakha Republic
- Range coordinates: 68°33′N 137°15′E
- Parent range: Chersky Range, East Siberian System

Geology
- Orogeny: Alpine orogeny

Climbing
- Easiest route: From Batagay

The Ymiysky Range (Russian: Ымыйский кряж; Yakut: Ымый томтороот, romanized: Imıy tomtoroot) is a mountain range in the Verkhoyansk District, Sakha Republic (Yakutia), Far Eastern Federal District, Russia. The nearest airfield is Batagay Airport.

== Geography ==
The Ymiysky Range rises off the northwestern side of the Khadaranya Range, located to the east of the lower course of the Yana River. It is one of the smaller ranges in the northern sector of the Chersky Range.

The northern end of the ridge rises south east of the confluence of the Oldzho river with the Nenneli, its main tributary. The range stretches east of the right bank of river Nenneli in a roughly NW–SE direction for about 50 kilometers (31 mi). The Kisilyakh Range rises to the southwest of the Nenneli valley. The highest peak is an unnamed 1,045.4 metres (3,430 ft) high summit.

== See also ==
- List of mountains and hills of Russia
