= Oldzho =

Oldzho Yakut: Олдьо
- Location in the Sakha Republic, Russia

Location
- Country: Russia

Physical characteristics
- Source
  - location: Khadaranya Range
  - coordinates: 68°38′35″N 138°08′38″E
  - elevation: 1,100 m (3,600 ft)
- Mouth: Yana River
  - coordinates: 68°25′13″N 134°54′25″E
  - elevation: 102 m (335 ft)
- Length: 330 km (210 mi)
- Basin size: 16,100 km^{2} (6,200 sq mi)
- Discharge
  - average: 110 m^{3}/s (3,900 cu ft/s)

Basin features
- Progression: Yana→ Laptev Sea

The Oldzho (Russian: Ольджо; Yakut: Олдьо, romanized: Olco), also known as Oldyo (Russian: Ольдё) or Olduo (Yakut: Олдьуо, romanized: Olcuo), is a river in the Verkhoyansk District, Sakha Republic, Russia. It is a right tributary of the Yana.

The length of the river is 330 kilometres (210 mi) and the area of its drainage basin 16,100 square kilometres (6,200 mi^{2}). There are no settlements near the river. The nearest city is Batagay, and the nearest airfield Batagay Airport.

Grayling and lenok are found in the waters of the river.

== Course ==
River Oldzho originates in a lake in the northeast of the Khadaranya Range, located in a valley formed by the northeastern slopes of the Khadaranya and the southern end of the Burkat Range. The river flows first northwestwards, then makes a wide bend at the northern end of the Khadaranya Range and flows roughly southwestwards. After passing the northwestern end of the Ymiysky Range its course forms meanders and the Oldzo is joined on its left side by the Nenneli (Неннели), its largest tributary. Finally it reaches the right bank of the Yana 587 km (365 mi) from its mouth and about 30 km (19 mi) downstream from the confluence of the Adycha.

A trail goes along the Oldzho valley that joins the middle Yana basin with the valley of the Indigirka. The Oldzho is frozen between October and May.

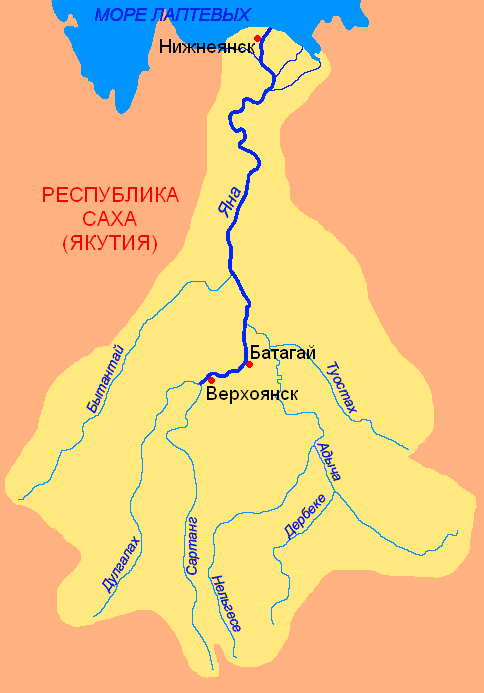
Basin of the Yana

== See also ==
- List of rivers of Russia
- Chersky Range
