= Lake Khaiyr =

Volcanic lake in eastern Siberia, Russia

- Russian: Хайыр; Yakut: Хайыр
- Location within Sakha Republic
- Location: Yakutia, eastern Siberia
- Coordinates: 70°46′40″N 133°28′22″E
- Basin countries: Russia
- Surface area: 72 acres (29 ha)

Lake Khaiyr (Russian: Хайыр; Yakut: Хайыр, Xayır) is a remote volcanic lake situated in the Yakutia region of eastern Siberia. Its surface area is approximately 72 acres (29 ha) and it has few fish. Its depth is yet unknown. It is called "Khaiyr" (meaning "to love" in modern Mongolian) due to the Mongol influence in the region. Lake is located about five kilometres (3.1 mi) to the south from settlement with the same name Khayyr (Russian: Хайыр).

== Monster Controversy ==
The lake has been the centre of a controversy since 1964 when a group of scientists from Moscow University, claim to have encountered an animal with prehistoric biology whilst on an expedition surveying mineral deposits.

An article written in Komsomolskaya Pravda by G. Rokosuev explains that the "monster" was initially seen by N. Gladkikh, the deputy leader of the expedition team:

Gladkikh went out to the lake to draw water and saw a creature that had crawled out onto the shore, apparently to eat the grass - a small head on a long gleaming neck, a huge body covered with jet-black skin and a vertical fin along the spine.

Gladikikh's story was at first met with incredulity by the rest of the team. However, the creature then reappeared to be seen by the leader of the expedition and several other members.

Rokosuev writes:

Suddenly a head appeared in the lake, then a dorsal fin. The creature beat the water with its long tail, producing waves on the lake. You can imagine when we saw with our own eyes that the stories were true.

Based on the team's descriptions, the monster closely resembles a plesiosaur, a prehistoric reptile thought to have become extinct around 66 million years ago. Some researchers think that this creature represents a mammalian herbivore which is just beyond the hippopotamus-stage that is pretty well adapted to aquatic life, but still feeds on shore rather than in the water. Due to the isolation of this northern lake, odd adaptations could arise.

== Scepticism ==
Since Khaiyr is resting above an active volcano, sceptics point out that most of the monster sightings have probably been caused by sub-aquatic tremors sending a rush of water boiling to the surface. As for the close-range sightings, no explanation has been offered. Due to the lake's isolated location it is not frequently visited and there have been few further sightings, such as the 1940 sighting of "two large black creatures" by the famous polar aviator, Hero of the Soviet Union Ivan Cherevichny and a celebrated Soviet polar helmsman Valentin Ivanovych Akkuratov who saw two large animals when flying over the lake at the height of 800–1000 m. Getting curious, they got down to 50 m and observed the animals, but the noise of the plane scared the creatures and they submerged.

Noted Cryptozoologist Karl Shuker had discovered later notices in the Russian press that the entire event had been a fabrication. A review on Drren Naish's blog Vertebrate Paleontology includes the expose: "But, alas, here the story must come to an end. As Karl Shuker explains in the newest issue of Fortean Times (I don't care what anyone says, I like reading it), the entire episode seems to have been a fabrication. As explained in an article published last year in Komsomolskaya Pravda, Gladkikh never was a biologist nor in fact even a scientist; he was instead a 'migrant worker' hired to help with the expedition. And while cryptozoologists have often expressed frustration about the lack of subsequent investigation of Lake Khaiyr and its possible monster, it turns out that such investigation actually did take place. Claims that the lake was devoid of fish, that birds wouldn't land on it, and that the locals had a tradition of sightings, were all false. Even better, Gladkikh admitted that he had fabricated the entire event (either 'to entertain himself and his friends or as an excuse for shirking his duties at work', said Pravda)". The same information was also repeated on the site Cryptomundo.

== See also ==
- Cryptozoology
- Lake monster
