= Sietinden Range =

Mountain range in Russia

- Сиэтэндэ
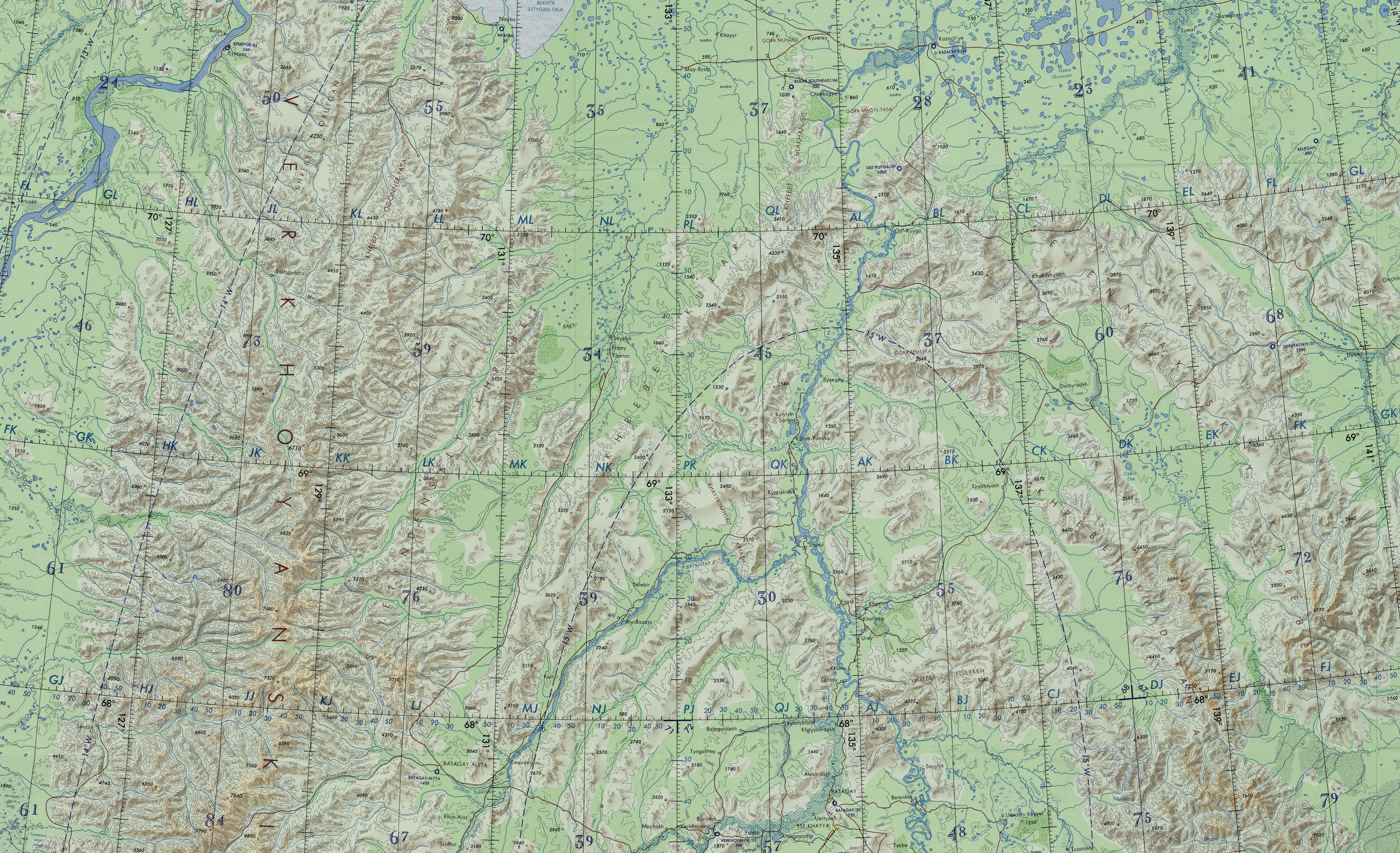
- ONC chart section showing the Sietinden on the left

Highest point
- Peak: Unnamed
- Elevation: 1,929 m (6,329 ft)
- Coordinates: 69°10′N 130°40′E

Dimensions
- Length: 200 km (120 mi) N / S
- Width: 40 km (25 mi) E/ W

Geography
- Location within Sakha Republic
- Location: Yakutia, Far Eastern Federal District
- Parent range: Verkhoyansk Range, East Siberian System

Geology
- Rock type(s): Sandstone, mudstone, slate

Climbing
- Easiest route: From Batagay-Alyta

The Sietinden Range (Russian: Сиетиндэнский хребет; Yakut: Сиэтэндэ) is a range of mountains in far North-eastern Russia. Administratively the range is part of the Sakha Republic, Russian Federation.

Batagay-Alyta, the only permanent settlement in the area, lies off the southeastern slopes of the range.

== History ==
Previously uncharted, this range was first put on the map in 1932 by Soviet geologist Ivan Atlasov, Professor of the Arctic and Antarctic Research Institute, who carried out geological surveys in Yakutia. After having explored and mapped most of the Orulgan Range to the west, Atlasov sighted the Sietinden Range rising above the left bank of the upper Omoloy.

== Geography ==
The Sietinden is one of the northern subranges of the Verkhoyansk Range system. It is located in the main ridge, stretching southwards to the west of the Orulgan Range and almost parallel to it. The valley of the Omoloy river, which has its source in the range, runs on the eastern flanks of the range and along the western side flows the Kuranakh-Yuryakh. The Kular Range rises to the east, beyond the Omoloy.

The highest point of the Sietinden is an unnamed 1,929 metres (6,329 ft) high summit located in its southern section.

== Flora ==
The mountain slopes are covered with sparse larch forests and the valleys with tundra.

== See also ==
- List of mountains and hills of Russia
