= Kular Range =

Mountain range in Russia

- хребет Кулар / Кулар сис
- Location within Sakha Republic

Highest point
- Peak: Unnamed
- Elevation: 1,289 m (4,229 ft)
- Coordinates: 68°54′N 131°53′E

Dimensions
- Length: 380 km (240 mi) NE / SW

Geography
- Location: Sakha Republic, Far Eastern Federal District
- Parent range: Verkhoyansk Range, East Siberian System

Geology
- Rock types: Shale, sandstone and Granite intrusions (North)

The Kular Range (Russian: хребет Кулар, Khrebet Kular; Yakut: Кулар сис, Kular Sis) is a range of mountains in far North-eastern Russia. Administratively the range is part of the Eveno-Bytantaysky National District of the Sakha Republic, Russian Federation.

This range is one of the places in Yakutia where yedoma are found.

== Geography ==
The Kular Range extends in an arch north of Batagay-Alyta to the NE for about 380 kilometres (240 mi), west and NW of the Bytantay River and west of the Yana, after it joins that great river. In the northeast rise the Kyundyulyun mountains, a prolongation beyond the Yana River and to the southeast the Yana Plateau. The highest point of the Kular Range is an unnamed 1,289 metres (4,229 ft) high summit.

It is one of the main subranges of the Verkhoyansk Range system. To the west it is limited by the Omoloy River valley, beyond which rises the Sietinden Range, which runs in a parallel direction. The range is deeply cut by wide riverine intermontane basins in its middle part. Rivers Baky and Ulakhan-Kyuegyulyur have their source in the range. The Yana-Indigirka Lowland lies to the northeast.

=== Ulakhan Sis Range ===
Near the northern end of the Kular Range, at 70°23′46.2″N 134°22′37.95″E —about 440 kilometres (270 mi) north of the Arctic Circle, there is a branch of the main range running northwards named Ulakhan Sis. It is about 100 kilometres (62 mi) long and its highest point is 496 metres (1,627 ft). The Yana River meanders northwards east of the Ulakhan Sis Range and beyond it rises the Magyl-Tasa Massif.

=== Khayrdakh Ridge ===
The Khayrdakh Ridge (Russian: Хайырдахский кряж Yakut: Хайыырдаах томтороот) is a smaller subrange of the Kular Range located between the lower course of the Bytantay and the Baky.

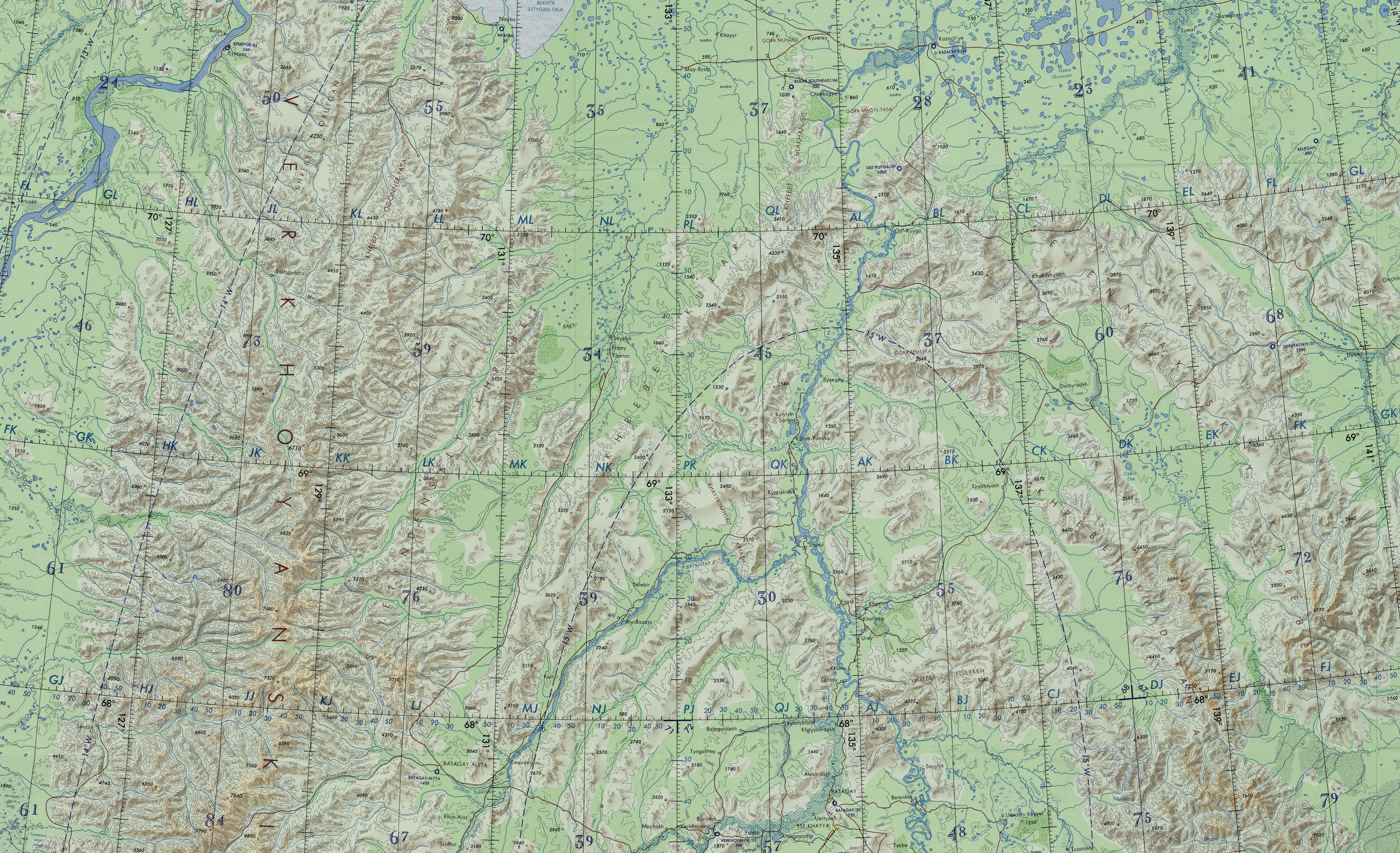
Map section showing the Kular Range in the middle and its Ulakhan Sis subrange at the top.

== Flora ==
The mountains are covered with mountain tundra and in the valleys with larch forests and tundra.
