= Eveno-Bytantaysky National District =

Eveno-Bytantaysky National District Эвено-Бытантайский национальный улус (Russian)
- District

Other transcription(s)
  - Even: Эвэн Бытантай буган
  - Yakut: Эбээн-Бытантай улууһа
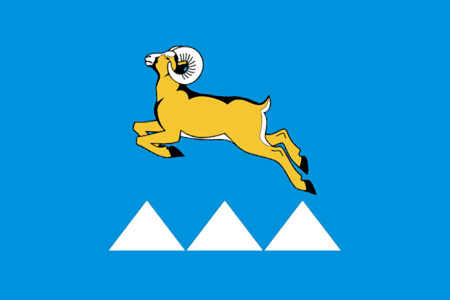
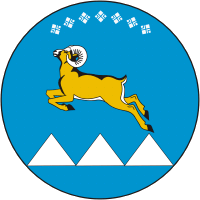
- Flag Coat of arms
- Location of Eveno-Bytantaysky National District in the Sakha Republic
- Coordinates: 67°48′N 130°24′E
- Country: Russia
- Federal subject: Sakha Republic
- Established: April 21, 1989
- Administrative center: Batagay-Alyta

Area
  - Total: 52,300 km^{2} (20,200 sq mi)

Population (2010 Census)
  - Total: 2,867
  - Density: 0.0548/km^{2} (0.142/sq mi)
  - Urban: 0%
  - Rural: 100%

Administrative structure
  - Administrative divisions: 3 Rural okrugs
  - Inhabited localities: 4 rural localities

Municipal structure
  - Municipally incorporated as: Eveno-Bytantaysky Municipal District
  - Municipal divisions: 0 urban settlements, 3 rural settlements
- Time zone: UTC+9 (MSK+6)
- OKTMO ID: 98659000
- Website: https://mr-jeveno-bytantajskij.sakha.gov.ru/

Population of Eveno-Bytantaysky National District
- 2010 Census: 2,867
- 2002 Census: 2,761

Eveno-Bytantaysky National District (Russian: Эве́но-Бытанта́йский национа́льный улу́с; Even: Эвэн Бытантай буган; Yakut: Эбээн-Бытантай улууһа, romanized: Ebeen-Bıtantay uluuha) is an administrative and municipal district (raion, or ulus), one of the thirty-four in the Sakha Republic, Russia. The area of the district is 52,300 square kilometers (20,200 sq mi). Its administrative center is the rural locality (a selo) of Batagay-Alyta. As of the 2010 Census, the total population of the district was 2,867, with the population of Batagay-Alyta accounting for 63.9% of that number.

== History ==
The district was established on April 21, 1989, when its territory was split out of Verkhoyansky District. The district's name refers to its designation as a national (ethnic) district for the Evens, who comprised 32.35% of the population in 1989, as well as its location on the Bytantay River.

== Geography ==
The district is located within the Arctic Circle, between the Lena and Yana Rivers. The western section of the district is dominated by the Verkhoyansk Range, the north and east—by the Kular Mountains.

== Administrative and municipal status ==
Within the framework of administrative divisions, Eveno-Bytantaysky National District is one of the thirty-four in the republic. The district is divided into three rural okrugs (naslegs) which comprise four rural localities. As a municipal division, the district is incorporated as Eveno-Bytantaysky Municipal District. Its three rural okrugs are incorporated into three rural settlements within the municipal district. The selo of Batagay-Alyta serves as the administrative center of both the administrative and municipal district.

=== Inhabited localities ===
Administrative/municipal composition
Rural okrugs/Rural settlements	Population	Rural localities in jurisdiction*
Verkhnebytantaysky (Верхнебытантайский)	269	**selo of Dzhargalakh**
Nizhnebytantaysky (Нижнебытантайский)	766	**selo of Kustur**; selo of Aly
Tyugesirsky (Тюгесирский)	1,832	**selo of Batagay-Alyta** (administrative center of the district)

*Administrative centers are shown in bold

== Demographics ==
As of the 2021 Census, the ethnic composition was as follows:

- Evens: 58.9%
- Yakuts: 39.1%
- Russians: 0.6%
- others: 1.4%

== Economy ==
The economy of the district depends mainly on agriculture such as reindeer herding and the breeding of cattle and horses. The district is among the most inaccessible territories of the republic.
