= Batagay-Alyta =

Batagay-Alyta Батагай-Алыта
- Selo

Other transcription(s)
  - Yakut: Баатаҕай Алыыта
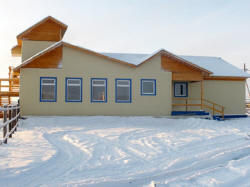
- Airport Terminal

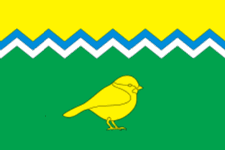
- Flag
- Interactive map of Batagay-Alyta
- Location of Batagay-Alyta Batagay-Alyta (Sakha Republic)
- Coordinates: 67°47′54″N 130°24′04″E
- Country: Russia
- Federal subject: Sakha Republic
- Administrative district: Eveno-Bytantaysky National District
- Rural okrugSelsoviet: Tyugesirsky Rural Okrug
- Founded: 1936
- Elevation: 494 m (1,621 ft)

Population (2010 Census)
  - Total: 1,832
  - Estimate (2021): 1,953 (+6.6%)

Administrative status
  - Capital of: Eveno-Bytantaysky National District, Tyugesirsky Rural Okrug

Municipal status
  - Municipal district: Eveno-Bytantaysky Municipal District
  - Rural settlement: Tyugesirsky Rural Settlement
  - Capital of: Eveno-Bytantaysky Municipal District, Tyugesirsky Rural Settlement
- Time zone: UTC+
- Postal code: 678580
- OKTMO ID: 98659420101

Batagay-Alyta (Russian: Батагай-Алыта; Yakut: Баатаҕай Алыыта, romanized: Baatağay Alııta, [baːtaʁaj alɯːta]), also known as Sakkyryr (Russian: Саккырыр; Yakut: Саккырыыр, romanized: Sakkırıır, [saqqɯɾɯːɾ]) is a rural locality (a selo) and the administrative center of Eveno-Bytantaysky National District in the Sakha Republic, Russia. Its population as of the 2010 Census was 1,832.

== Geography ==
Batagay-Alyta is located on the eastern flank of the Verkhoyansk Range, and southeast of the southern end of the Sietinden Range and southwest of the Kular Range. The town lies about 380 kilometres (240 mi) to the north of the capital Yakutsk and a few kilometers from the left bank of the Ulakhan-Sakkyryr River, a tributary of the Bytantay.

== History ==
It was founded in 1936 as the administrative center for the then newly created Sakkyryrsky District. It lost this function with the dissolution of the district in 1963, but regained it with the creation of Eveno-Bytantaysky District in 1989.

== Demographics ==
Population: 1,832 (2010 census); 1,722 (2002 census).

The population includes a large proportion of Evens, with the Even language taught in the local school.

== Transportation ==
Batagay-Alyta is served by the Sakkyryr Airport (IATA: SUK). There are no year-round roads connecting to Batagay-Alyta, although a winter road offers a route east to Verkhoyansk and Batagay when the rivers are frozen.

== Climate ==
Batagay-Alyta has an extremely cold subarctic climate (Köppen climate classification Dfd) with long, extremely cold winters and short, mild (sometimes warm) summers. The seasonal temperature variation is among the greatest in the world. Precipitation is very low, but somewhat higher in the summer.

Climate data for Batagay-Alyta
Month	Jan	Feb	Mar	Apr	May	Jun	Jul	Aug	Sep	Oct	Nov	Dec	Year
Mean daily maximum °C (°F)	−43.3 (−45.9)	−38.7 (−37.7)	−18.8 (−1.8)	−3.1 (26.4)	9.7 (49.5)	18.9 (66.0)	22.6 (72.7)	18.7 (65.7)	7.6 (45.7)	−10.2 (13.6)	−30.8 (−23.4)	−41.4 (−42.5)	−9.1 (15.7)
Mean daily minimum °C (°F)	−46.9 (−52.4)	−46.6 (−51.9)	−37.0 (−34.6)	−21.0 (−5.8)	−1.8 (28.8)	7.6 (45.7)	10.9 (51.6)	6.2 (43.2)	−1.8 (28.8)	−18.1 (−0.6)	−36.1 (−33.0)	−45.0 (−49.0)	−19.1 (−2.4)
Average precipitation mm (inches)	5.9 (0.23)	6.2 (0.24)	5.6 (0.22)	3.4 (0.13)	15.3 (0.60)	32.4 (1.28)	27.1 (1.07)	26.1 (1.03)	16.8 (0.66)	8.9 (0.35)	10.0 (0.39)	6.0 (0.24)	163.7 (6.44)
Average precipitation days	8	7	5	3	6	10	10	10	7	7	8	6	87
Source 1: https://web.archive.org/web/20131006193245/http://www.storm247.com/weather/118964226/climate (temperature)
Source 2: http://www.worldweatheronline.com/Batagay-Alyta-weather-averages/Sakha/RU.aspx (precipitation)
