= Kazachye =

Kazachye Казачье
- Selo

Other transcription(s)
  - Yakut: Хаһаачыйа
- Interactive map of Kazachye
- Location of Kazachye Kazachye (Sakha Republic)
- Coordinates: 70°45′08″N 136°14′03″E
- Country: Russia
- Federal subject: Sakha Republic
- Administrative district: Bulunsky District
- Rural okrugSelsoviet: Kazachinsky National Rural Okrug
- Founded: 1636

Population (2010 Census)
  - Total: 1,367
  - Estimate (2021): 1,188 (−13.1%)

Administrative status
  - Capital of: Kazachinsky National Rural Okrug

Municipal status
  - Municipal district: Bulunsky Municipal District
  - Rural settlement: Kazachinsky National Rural Settlement
  - Capital of: Kazachinsky National Rural Settlement
- Time zone: UTC+
- Postal code: 678560
- OKTMO ID: 98656405101

Kazachye (Russian: Казачье, Yakut: Хаһаачыйа, romanized: Xahaaçıya) is a rural locality (a selo), the only inhabited locality, and the administrative center of Kazachinsky National Rural Okrug of Bulunsky District in the Sakha Republic, Russia, located 486 kilometers (302 mi) from Tiksi, the administrative center of the district. Its population as of the 2010 Census was 1,367, of whom 665 were male and 702 female, down from 1,531 recorded during the 2002 Census.
