= Omoloy =

Omoloy Омолой
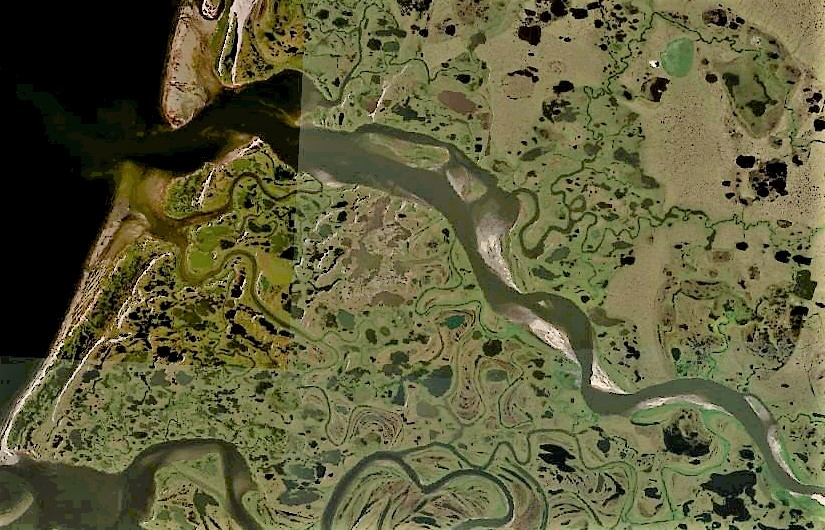
- Mouth of the Omoloy Sentinel-2 image

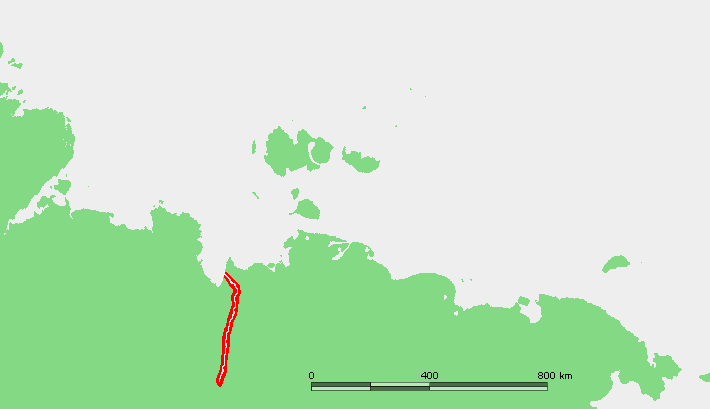
- Course of the Omoloy in northeastern Siberia

- Mouth location in Yakutia, Russia

Location
- Country: Russia

Physical characteristics
- Source: Sietinden Range
  - coordinates: 68°07′18″N 130°32′32″E
  - elevation: 1,100 m (3,600 ft)
- Mouth: Laptev Sea
  - location: Buor-Khaya Gulf
  - coordinates: 71°13′52″N 131°59′31″E
- Length: 593 km (368 mi)
- Basin size: 38,900 km^{2} (15,000 sq mi)

The Omoloy (Russian: Омолой Yakut: Омолой) is a river in Siberia, flowing into the Laptev Sea east of the river Lena. It is 593 kilometres (368 mi) long, and has a drainage basin of 38,900 square kilometres (15,000 sq mi). Administratively the basin of the Omoloy is part of the Sakha (Yakutia) administrative region of Russia.

There is a 332,500 ha (822,000 acres) protected area in the basin of the river. The now extinct Beringian steppe bison used to have its habitat in the area of the Omoloy.

== Course ==
It flows roughly northwards across the tundra along a valley limited by the Sietinden Range to the west and the Kular Range to the east. Both ranges are part of the Verkhoyansk Range system. The Omoloy flows through the East Siberian Lowland into the Laptev Sea. Its mouth is located in the eastern coast of the Buor-Khaya Gulf. The river freezes up in October and stays under ice until late May or early June.

=== Tributaries ===
The main tributaries of the Omoloy are the 279 km (173 mi) long Kuranakh-Yuryakh, the 190 km (120 mi) long Arga-Yuryakh, the 91 km (57 mi) long Bukhuruk (Бухурук) and the 98 km (61 mi) long Sietinde (Сиэтиндьэ) from its left side, as well as the 159 km (99 mi) long Ulakhan-Kyuegyulyur from the right.

== See also ==
- List of rivers of Russia
- Verkhoyansk Range
