= Ust-Yansky District =

Ust-Yansky District Усть-Янский улус (Russian)
- District

Other transcription(s)
  - Sakha: Усуйаана улууһа
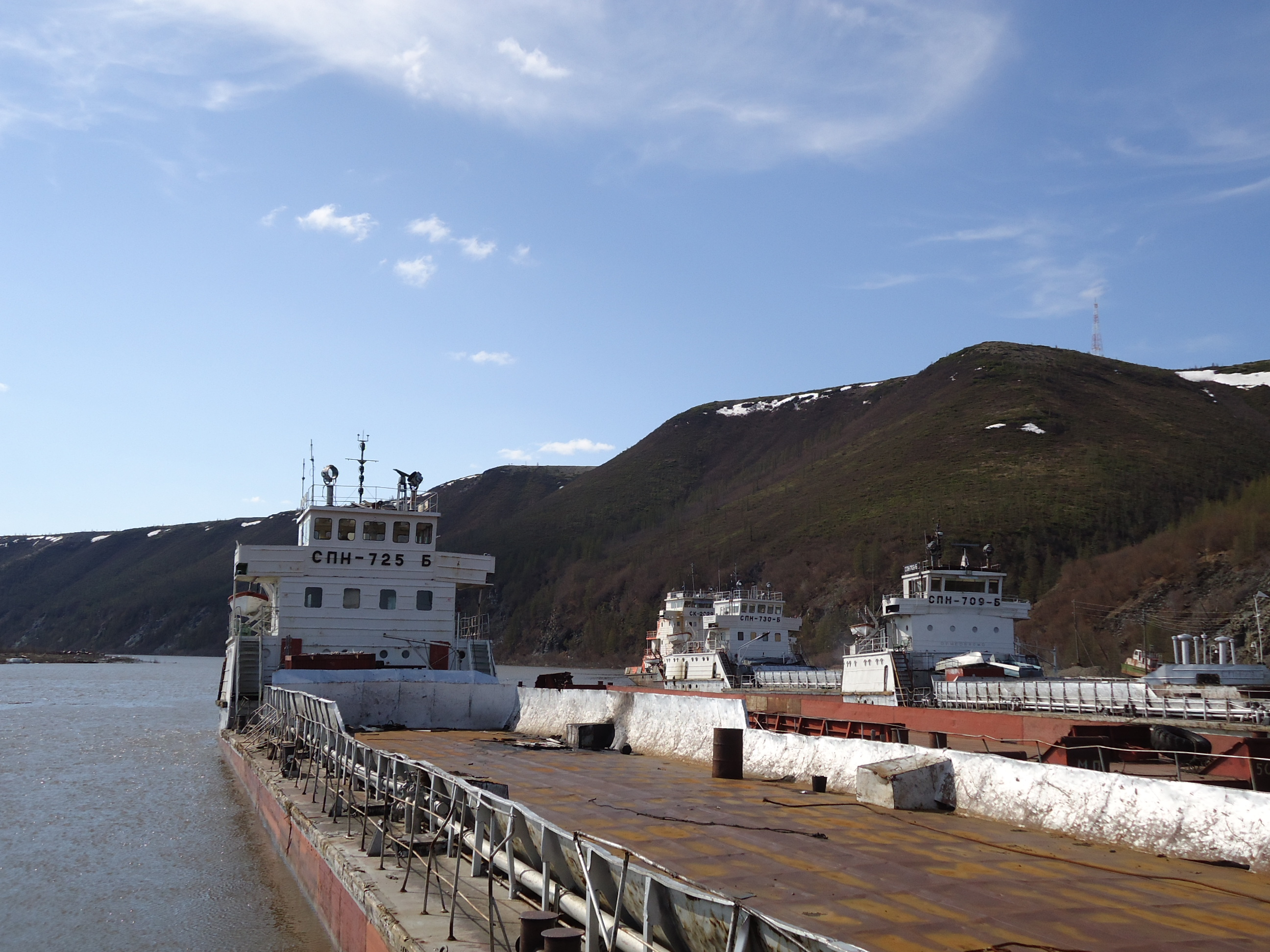
- Ship by the Kyundyulyun, Ust-Yansky District

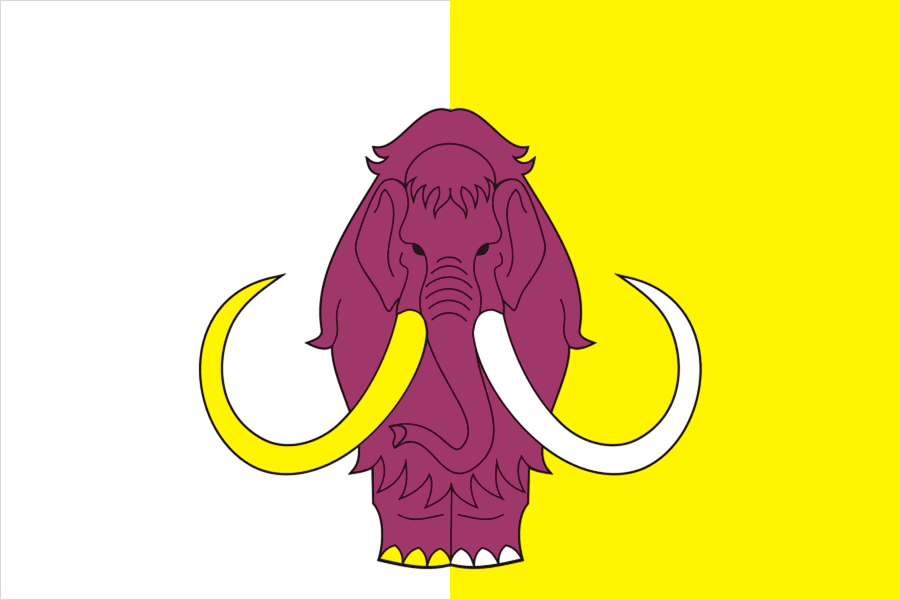
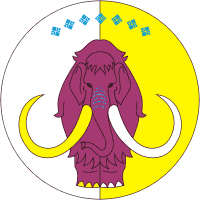
- Flag Coat of arms
- Location of Ust-Yansky District in the Sakha Republic
- Coordinates: 71°25′N 136°10′E
- Country: Russia
- Federal subject: Sakha Republic
- Established: January 5, 1967
- Administrative center: Deputatsky

Area
  - Total: 120,300 km^{2} (46,400 sq mi)

Population (2010 Census)
  - Total: 8,056
  - Density: 0.06697/km^{2} (0.1734/sq mi)
  - Urban: 54.0%
  - Rural: 46.0%

Administrative structure
  - Administrative divisions: 3 Settlements, 7 Rural okrugs
  - Inhabited localities: 3 urban-type settlements, 7 rural localities

Municipal structure
  - Municipally incorporated as: Ust-Yansky Municipal District
  - Municipal divisions: 3 urban settlements, 7 rural settlements
- Time zone: UTC+
- OKTMO ID: 98656000
- Website: https://mr-ust-janskij.sakha.gov.ru/

Ust-Yansky District (Russian: Усть-Я́нский улу́с; Yakut: Усуйаана улууһа, romanized: Usuyaana uluuha, Yakut pronunciation: [usujaːna uluːha]) is an administrative and municipal district (raion, or ulus), one of the thirty-four in the Sakha Republic, Russia. It is located in the north of the republic in the Yana River delta on the coast of the Laptev Sea and borders with Allaikhovsky and Abyysky Districts in the east, Momsky District in the south, Verkhoyansky District in the southwest, and with Bulunsky District in the west. The area of the district is 120,300 square kilometers (46,400 sq mi). Its administrative center is the urban locality (a settlement) of Deputatsky. Population: 6,810 (2021 census); 8,056 (2010 census); 10,009 (2002 census); 41,265 (1989 Soviet census). The population of Deputatsky accounts for 37.0% of the district's total population.

== Geography ==
The main rivers in the district include the Yana, the Omoloy with the Ulakhan-Kyuegyulyur, the Sellyakh, as well as the Chondon with its tributary the Nuchcha. The Kyundyulyun, northernmost spur of the Chersky Range, rises north of Ust-Kuyga. There are numerous lakes in the district. Orotko is one of the largest.

Average January temperature ranges from −32 to −40 °C (−26 to −40 °F) and average July temperature ranges from +4 to +12 °C (39 to 54 °F). Annual precipitation ranges from 150–200 millimeters (5.9–7.9 in) in the north to 250–300 millimeters (9.8–11.8 in) in the south.

== History ==
The district was established on January 5, 1967.

== Demographics ==
Historical population
Year	Pop.	±%
1970	15,436	—
1979	24,845	+61.0%
1989	41,265	+66.1%
2002	10,009	−75.7%
2010	8,056	−19.5%
2021	6,810	−15.5%
Source: Census data

As of the 1989 Census, the district had a population of 41,265 inhabitants, with an ethnic composition as follows:

- Russians: 58.7%
- Yakuts: 8.7%
- Evens: 2.2%
- Evenks: 0.1%
- other ethnicities: 30.3%

However, a great deal of the ethnic Russian population left with the economic downturn following the collapse of the Soviet Union, so much so that the district lost over three-quarters of its population during the 1990s.

In the 2021 census, the indigenous Yakuts again formed a plurality (around a half) of the inhabitants, with the total population now just 6,810. In that year, the ethnic composition of the district was:

- Yakuts: 48.5%
- Russians: 20.7%
- Evens: 20.2%
- Yukaghirs: 2.8%
- Ukrainians: 2.7%
- other ethnicities: 5.1%

== Economy ==
The main industries are gold mining, reindeer herding, fishing, and fur trade. There are deposits of gold, tin, tungsten, mercury, lead, zinc, and brown coal.

== Inhabited localities ==
Municipal composition
Urban settlements	Population	Male	Female	Inhabited localities in jurisdiction
Deputatsky (Депутатский)	2983	1447 (48.5%)	1536 (51.5%)	urban-type settlement of Deputatsky (administrative center of the district)
Nizhneyansk (Нижнеянск)	391	208 (53.2%)	183 (46.8%)	urban-type settlement of Nizhneyansk
Ust-Kuyga (Усть-Куйга)	979	516 (52.7%)	463 (47.3%)	urban-type settlement of Ust-Kuyga
Rural settlements	Population	Male	Female	Rural localities in jurisdiction*
Kazachinsky National Nasleg (Казачинский национальный наслег)	1367	665 (48.6%)	702 (51.4%)	**selo of Kazachye**
Omoloysysky National Nasleg (Омолойский национальный наслег)	433	223 (51.5%)	210 (48.5%)	**selo of Khayyr**
Silyannyakhsky National Nasleg (Силянняхский национальный наслег)	771	377 (48.9%)	394 (51.1%)	**selo of Sayylyk**
Tumatsky National Nasleg (Туматский национальный наслег)	533	286 (53.7%)	247 (46.3%)	**selo of Tumat**
Ust-Yansky National Nasleg (Усть-Янский национальный наслег)	317	166 (52.4%)	151 (47.6%)	**selo of Ust-Yansk**
Uyandinsky National Nasleg (Уяндинский национальный наслег)	154	84 (54.5%)	70 (45.5%)	**selo of Uyandi**
Yukagir National (Nomadic) Nasleg (Юкагирский национальный кочевой наслег)	128	67 (52.3%)	61 (47.7%)	**selo of Yukagir**

Divisional source:
Population source:
*Administrative centers are shown in bold
