= Deputatsky =

Deputatskiy Депутатский
- Urban-type settlement

Other transcription(s)
  - Yakut: Депутатскай
- Interactive map of Deputatskiy
- Location of Deputatskiy Deputatskiy (Sakha Republic)
- Coordinates: 69°19′N 139°59′E
- Country: Russia
- Federal subject: Sakha Republic
- Administrative district: Ust-Yansky District
- SettlementSelsoviet: Deputatsky
- Founded: 1951
- Urban-type settlement status since: 1958
- Elevation: 600 m (2,000 ft)

Population (2010 Census)
  - Total: 2,983
  - Estimate (2023): 2,637 (−11.6%)

Administrative status
  - Capital of: Ust-Yansky District, Settlement of Deputatsky

Municipal status
  - Municipal district: Ust-Yansky Municipal District
  - Urban settlement: Deputatsky Urban Settlement
  - Capital of: Ust-Yansky Municipal District, Deputatsky Urban Settlement
- Time zone: UTC+
- Postal codes: 678540, 678549
- OKTMO ID: 98656151051
- Website: www.sakha.gov.ru/deputatsky

Deputatsky population
- 2010 Census: 2,983
- 2002 Census: 3,602
- 1989 Census: 13,305
- 1979 Census: 5,331

Deputatsky location

Deputatsky (Russian: Депута́тский; Yakut: Депутатскай, romanized: Deputatskay) is an urban locality (an urban-type settlement) and the administrative center of Ust-Yansky District in the Sakha Republic, Russia, located in the Selennyakh Range, about 930 kilometers (580 mi) north-northeast of Yakutsk, the capital of the republic. As of the 2010 Census, its population was 2,983.

== Geography ==
Deputatsky is spread out along a 10-kilometer (6.2 mi) section of the Oyun-Unguokhtakh River, up to its mouth on the Irgichyan, which becomes a source of the Uyandina River.

== History ==
It was founded in 1951 as a mining settlement, exploiting nearby deposits of tin. In its early years, its workforce included Gulag prisoners. In 1958, Deputatsky was granted urban-type settlement status. In 1967, it replaced the selo of Kazachye as the administrative center of Ust-Yansky District.

Due to the downturn in the mining industry following the dissolution of the Soviet Union, more than three-quarters of population left during the 1990s. However, mine production continued and the population decline slowed down.

== Administrative and municipal status ==
Within the framework of administrative divisions, the urban-type settlement of Deputatsky serves as the administrative center of Ust-Yansky District. As an administrative division, it is incorporated within Ust-Yansky District as the Settlement of Deputatsky. As a municipal division, the Settlement of Deputatsky is incorporated within Deputatsky Municipal District as Deputatsky Urban Settlement.

== Transportation ==
Deputatsky is reachable by road to Ust-Kuyga, 250 kilometers (160 mi) away on the Yana River. From there, a winter road (zimnik) leads through Batagay and the Verkhoyansk Range to Topolinoye, from where the Kolyma Highway is accessible.

An unmaintained winter road heads east from Deputatsky down the Uyandina Valley to Belaya Gora.

A small airport on the northern edge of the settlement (ICAO-Code UEWD) provides air service.

== Climate ==
Deputatsky has an extreme subarctic climate (Köppen climate classification Dfc bordering on Dfd). Winters are prolonged and bitterly cold, with more than 8 months of sub-zero average temperatures, so that the soil remains permanently frozen. Permafrost and tundra cover most of the region. Average temperatures range from −37.8 °C (−36.0 °F) in January to +12.3 °C (54.1 °F) in July.

Climate data for Deputatsky
Month	Jan	Feb	Mar	Apr	May	Jun	Jul	Aug	Sep	Oct	Nov	Dec	Year
Record high °C (°F)	−8.2 (17.2)	−10.1 (13.8)	−0.7 (30.7)	9.0 (48.2)	25.0 (77.0)	32.2 (90.0)	34.9 (94.8)	31.2 (88.2)	21.2 (70.2)	9.6 (49.3)	−0.9 (30.4)	−7.7 (18.1)	34.9 (94.8)
Mean daily maximum °C (°F)	−33.7 (−28.7)	−31.8 (−25.2)	−22.4 (−8.3)	−9.9 (14.2)	3.4 (38.1)	15.2 (59.4)	18.3 (64.9)	14.0 (57.2)	4.4 (39.9)	−11.3 (11.7)	−26.4 (−15.5)	−31.7 (−25.1)	−9.3 (15.3)
Daily mean °C (°F)	−37.8 (−36.0)	−36.4 (−33.5)	−29.6 (−21.3)	−17.3 (0.9)	−2.0 (28.4)	9.3 (48.7)	12.3 (54.1)	8.4 (47.1)	0.2 (32.4)	−15.5 (4.1)	−30.4 (−22.7)	−35.8 (−32.4)	−14.6 (5.7)
Mean daily minimum °C (°F)	−41.9 (−43.4)	−40.7 (−41.3)	−35.9 (−32.6)	−25.1 (−13.2)	−7.4 (18.7)	4.3 (39.7)	7.0 (44.6)	3.5 (38.3)	−3.2 (26.2)	−19.9 (−3.8)	−34.6 (−30.3)	−39.9 (−39.8)	−19.5 (−3.1)
Record low °C (°F)	−59.6 (−75.3)	−57.5 (−71.5)	−53.5 (−64.3)	−50.3 (−58.5)	−35.2 (−31.4)	−10.1 (13.8)	−3.5 (25.7)	−8.8 (16.2)	−22.1 (−7.8)	−42.7 (−44.9)	−50.9 (−59.6)	−55.6 (−68.1)	−59.6 (−75.3)
Average precipitation mm (inches)	7 (0.3)	7 (0.3)	6 (0.2)	8 (0.3)	15 (0.6)	30 (1.2)	45 (1.8)	43 (1.7)	25 (1.0)	15 (0.6)	9 (0.4)	7 (0.3)	217 (8.7)
Average precipitation days (≥ 0.1 mm)	11.2	10.0	8.2	7.6	9.2	11.1	12.0	12.3	13.0	15.5	12.0	10.4	132.5
Source 1: http://climatebase.ru/station/24076
Source 2: https://en.climate-data.org/location/770836/ (precipitation only)
