= List of rural localities in the Sakha Republic =

Map of Russia with the Sakha Republic highlighted

This is a list of rural localities in the Sakha Republic, organized by district. The Sakha (Yakutia) Republic (Russian: Республика Саха (Якутия), romanized: Respublika Sakha (Yakutiya), IPA: [rʲɪsˈpublʲɪkə sɐˈxa jɪˈkutʲɪjə]; Yakut: Саха Өрөспүүбүлүкэтэ, romanized: Sakha Öröspüübülükete, [saˈxa øɾøsˈpyːbylykete]), simply Sakha (Yakutia) (Russian: Саха (Якутия); Yakut: Саха Сирэ, romanized: Sakha Sire), is a federal subject of Russia (a republic). It has a population of 958,528 (2010 Census), consisting mainly of ethnic Yakuts and Russians.

== Abyysky District ==
Rural localities in Abyysky District:

- Abyy
- Druzhina
- Dyosku
- Keng-Kyuyol
- Kuberganya
- Suturuokha
- Syagannakh

== Aldansky District ==
Rural localities in Aldansky District:

- Bolshoy Nimnyr
- Chagda
- Khatystyr
- Kutana
- Orochen 1-y
- Orochen 2-y
- Ugoyan
- Ulu
- Uoray
- Verkhny Kuranakh
- Verkhnyaya Amga
- Yakokit
- Yakokut
- Yllymakh
- Yefremovo

== Allaikhovsky District ==
Rural localities in Allaikhovsky District:

- Chkalov
- Nychalakh
- Olenegorsk
- Oyotung
- Russkoye Ustye
- Vorontsovo

== Amginsky District ==
Rural localities in Amginsky District:

- Abaga
- Altantsy
- Amga
- Betyuntsy
- Bolugur
- Bulun
- Chakyr 2-y
- Chapchylgan
- Emissy
- Mikhaylovka
- Myandigi
- Olom-Kyuyole
- Onnyos
- Pokrovka
- Promkombinat
- Satagay
- Serge-Bes
- Sulgachchy
- Tegyulte
- Uoray

== Anabarsky District ==
Rural localities in Anabarsky District:

- Ebelyakh
- Saskylakh
- Yuryung-Khaya

== Bulunsky District ==
Rural localities in Bulunsky District

- Bykovsky
- Chekurovka
- Kazachye
- Kyusyur
- Namy
- Nayba
- Siktyakh
- Sklad
- Taymylyr
- Ust-Olenyok

== Churapchinsky District ==
Rural localities in Churapchinsky District:

- Arylakh
- Berya, Russia
- Churapcha
- Chyappara
- Diring, Khoptoginsky Rural Okrug
- Diring, Tyolyoysky Rural Okrug
- Dyabyla
- Dyarla
- Khakhyyakh
- Kharbala 1-ya
- Kharbala 2-ya
- Kilyanki
- Kyndal
- Kystyk-Kugda
- Lebiya
- Maralayy
- Myandiye
- Myndagay
- Myryla
- Ogusur
- Tolon, Bakhsytsky Rural Okrug
- Tolon, Chakyrsky Rural Okrug
- Tuora-Kyuyol
- Ulakhan-Ebya
- Ulakhan-Kyuyol
- Uorga
- Usun-Kyuyol
- Vasily-Alasa
- Yuryakh-Kyuyore
- Yuryung-Kyuyol

== Eveno-Bytantaysky National District ==
Rural localities in Eveno-Bytantaysky National District:

- Aly
- Batagay-Alyta
- Dzhargalakh
- Kustur

== Gorny District ==
Rural localities in Gorny District:

- Asyma
- Berdigestyakh
- Byas-Kyuyol
- Chekya-Byas
- Dikimdya
- Ebya
- Keptin
- Kharyyalakh
- Kyuyorelyakh
- Magaras
- May
- Orto-Surt
- Tongulakh
- Tysagachchy
- Ulu-Sysy
- Yert

== Khangalassky District ==
Rural localities within Khangalassky District:

- Bestyakh
- Bestyakhsky Rural Okrug
- Bulgunnyakhtakh
- Chapayevo
- Charang
- Chkalov
- Isit
- Kachikattsy
- Karapatskoye
- Kerdyom
- Kharyyalakh
- Khotochchu
- Kysyl-Yuryuyya
- Kytyl-Dyura
- Nokhoroy
- Nuochakha
- Oktyomtsy
- Oy, Russia
- Sinsk
- Tit-Ary
- Tit-Ebya
- Toyon-Ary
- Tumul
- Tyokhtyur
- Ulakh-An
- Ulakhan-An
- Yedey
- Yelanka

== Kobyaysky District ==
Rural localities in Kobyaysky District:

- Argas
- Aryktakh
- Arylakh
- Aviaport
- Bagadya
- Batamay
- Byranattalakh
- Chagda
- Kalvitsa
- Khatyryk-Khomo
- Kobyay
- Lyuksyugyun
- Mastakh
- Mastakh 2-y
- Oyun-Unguokhtakh
- Saga
- Sayylyk
- Sebyan-Kyuyol
- Segyan-Kyuyol
- Sitte
- Smorodichny
- Tyaya

== Lensky District ==
Rural localities in Lensky District:

- Alysardakh
- Batamay
- Bechencha
- Chamcha
- Dorozhny
- Innyaly
- Khamra
- Krestovsky lesouchastok
- Murya
- Natora
- Nyuya
- Nyuya Severnaya
- Orto-Nakhara
- Tolon
- Turukta
- Yaroslavsky

== Megino-Kangalassky District ==
Rural localities in Megino-Kangalassky District:

- Balyktakh
- Bedemyo
- Bedzhelek
- Byokyo
- Byrama
- Byuteydyakh
- Chyuyya
- Darkylakh
- Kerdyugen
- Khapchagay
- Khaptagay
- Kharba-Atakh
- Khatylyma
- Khocho
- Khomustakh
- Khorobut
- Lomtuka
- Matta
- Mayyality
- Nuoragana
- Pavlovsk
- Petrovka
- Rassoloda
- Soto
- Suola, Meldekhsinsky Rural Okrug
- Suola, Moruksky Rural Okrug
- Symakh
- Tabaga
- Tarat
- Teligi
- Tomtor
- Tumul
- Tyokhtyur
- Tyungyulyu
- Yelechey

== Mirninsky District ==
Rural localities in Mirninsky District:

- Arylakh
- Berezovka
- Morkoka
- Novy
- Polyarny
- Syuldyukar
- Tas-Yuryakh
- Zarya

== Momsky District ==
Rural localities in Momsky District:

- Buor-Sysy
- Chumpu-Kytyl
- Khonuu
- Kulun-Yelbyut
- Sasyr
- Sobolokh
- Suon-Tit

== Namsky District ==
Rural localities in Namsky District:

- Appany
- Bulus
- Byutyay-Yurdya
- Frunze
- Grafsky Bereg
- Kharyyalakh
- Khatas
- Khongor-Biye
- Krest-Kytyl
- Kysyl-Derevnya
- Kysyl-Syr
- Kyureng-At
- Maymaga
- Namtsy
- Nikolskykha
- Partizan
- Stolby
- Sygynnakh
- Taragay-Byas
- Tumul
- Voiny
- Yergyolyokh
- Ymyyakhtakh
- Yuner-Olokh

== Neryungrinsky District ==
Rural localities in Neryungrinsky District:

- Bolshoy Khatymi
- Iyengra

== Nizhnekolymsky District ==
Rural localities in Nizhnekolymsky District:

- Ambarchik
- Andryushkino
- Chukochya
- Dve Viski
- Kolymskoye
- Krestovaya
- Mikhalkino
- Nizhnekolymsk
- Petushki
- Pokhodsk
- Timkino
- Yermolovo

== Nyurbinsky District ==
Rural localities in Nyurbinsky District:

- Akana
- Antonovka
- Arangastakh
- Bysyttakh
- Chappanda
- Chkalov
- Chukar
- Dikimdya
- Engolzha
- Khaty
- Khatyn-Sysy
- Kirov
- Kyundyade
- Malykay
- Mar
- Neftebaza
- Nyurbachan
- Saltany
- Sayylyk
- Syulya
- Yedey
- Ynakhsyt
- Zharkhan

== Olenyoksky District ==
Rural localities in Olenyoksky District:

- Eyik
- Kharyyalakh
- Olenyok
- Zhilinda

== Olyokminsky District ==
Rural localities in Olyokminsky District:

- Abaga tsentralnaya
- Abaga
- Alexeyevka
- Aviaport
- Balagannakh
- Berdinka
- Biryuk
- Byas-Kyuyol
- Chapayevo
- Cherendey
- Daban
- Dapparay
- Delgey
- Dikimdya
- Innyakh
- Kharyyalakh
- Khating-Tumul
- Kholgo
- Khorintsy
- Kiliyer
- Kochegarovo
- Kudu-Byas
- Kudu-Kyuyol
- Kuranda
- Kyachchi
- Kyllakh
- Macha
- Malykan
- Markha
- Mekimdya
- Neftebaza
- Neryuktyayinsk 1-y
- Neryuktyayinsk 2-y
- Olom
- Olyokminsky
- Sanyyakhtakh
- Selivanovo
- Solyanka
- Tas-Anna
- Tegen
- Tinnaya
- Tokko
- Troitsk
- Tyanya
- Tyubya
- Ulakhan-Mungku
- Uolbut
- Uritskoye
- Yunkyur
- Zarechny
- Zaton LORPa
- Zharkhan

== Oymyakonsky District ==
Rural localities in Oymyakonsky District:

- Aeroport
- Agayakan
- Bereg-Yurdya
- Delyankir
- Khara-Tumul
- Kuranakh-Sala
- Kuydusun
- Kyubeme
- Orto-Balagan
- Oymyakon
- Teryut
- Tomtor
- Yuchyugey

== Srednekolymsky District ==
Rural localities in Srednekolymsky District:

- Aleko-Kyuyol
- Argakhtakh
- Berezovka
- Ebyakh
- Khatyngnakh
- Lobuya
- Nalimsk
- Oyusardakh
- Roman
- Soyangi
- Suchchino
- Svatay
- Sylgy-Ytar
- Urodan

== Suntarsky District ==
Rural localities in Suntarsky District:

- Agdary
- Allaga
- Arylakh
- Arylakh
- Bordon 3-y
- Byas-Sheya
- Chayygda
- Elgyan
- Elgyay
- Eyikyar
- Ilimnir
- Kempendyay
- Kharyyalakh
- Khordogoy
- Khoro
- Komsomol
- Krestyakh
- Kuokunu
- Kutana
- Kyukey
- Kyundyae
- Mar-Kyuyol
- Milyake
- Nakhara
- Neryuktyay
- Oyusut
- Sardanga
- Sheya
- Suntar
- Tenkya
- Tolon, Khadansky Rural Okrug
- Tolon, Tolonsky Rural Okrug
- Toybokhoy
- Tumul
- Tuoydakh
- Tyubyay
- Ustye
- Usun-Kyuyol
- Ygyatta

== Tattinsky District ==
Rural localities in Tattinsky District:

- Borobul
- Bulun
- Cherkyokh
- Chychymakh
- Chymnayi
- Dakky
- Daya-Amgata
- Debdirge
- Khara-Aldan
- Kharbalakh
- Kyyy
- Tomtor
- Tuora-Kyuyol
- Uolba
- Ytyk-Kyuyol

== Tomponsky District ==
Rural localities in Tomponsky District:

- Aeroport
- Ary-Tolon
- Keskil
- Krest-Khaldzhay
- Kyulyunken
- Megino-Aldan
- Novy
- Okhotsky-Perevoz
- Razvilka
- Saydy
- Topolinoye
- Tyoply Klyuch
- Udarnik

== Ust-Aldansky District ==
Rural localities in Ust-Aldansky District:

- Ary-Tit
- Arylakh
- Balagannakh
- Balyktakh
- Beydinga
- Borogontsy
- Byadi
- Byariye
- Charang
- Cheriktey
- Chiryapchi
- Daly
- Dygdal
- Dyupsya
- Elyasin
- Eselyakh
- Kepteni
- Khomustakh, Batagaysky Rural Okrug
- Khomustakh, Legyoysky Rural Okrug
- Khonogor
- Kylayy
- Mayagas
- Myndaba
- Ogorodtakh
- Okoyemovka
- Sasylykan
- Stoyka
- Syrdakh
- Tanda
- Tit-Ary
- Tomtor
- Tuluna
- Tumul
- Us-Kyuyol
- Usun-Kyuyol

== Ust-Maysky District ==
Rural localities in Ust-Maysky District:

- 8-y km
- Belkachi
- Ezhantsy
- Kyuptsy
- Petropavlovsk
- Troitsk
- Tumul
- Ust-Mil
- Ust-Ynykchan
- Ust-Yudoma

== Ust-Yansky District ==
Rural localities in Ust-Yansky District:

- Khayyr
- Sayylyk
- Tumat
- Ust-Yansk
- Uyandi
- Yukagir

== Verkhnekolymsky District ==
Rural localities in Verkhnekolymsky District:

- Nelemnoye
- Ugolnoye
- Usun-Kyuyol
- Utaya
- Verkhnekolymsk

== Verkhnevilyuysky District ==
Rural localities in Verkhnevilyuysky District:

- Andreyevsky
- Bagadya
- Balagannakh
- Botulu
- Bychchagdan
- Byrakan
- Byuteydyakh
- Chengere
- Dalyr
- Dyullyukyu
- Keng-Kyuyol
- Kharbala
- Kharyyalakh
- Khomustakh, Khomustakhsky Rural Okrug
- Khomustakh, Namsky Rural Okrug
- Khoro
- Kudu
- Kulusunnakh
- Kyotyordyokh
- Kyrykyy
- Kyul
- Lippe-Atakh
- May
- Orgyot
- Orosu
- Sayylyk
- Tamalakan
- Tuobuya
- Verkhnevilyuysk

== Verkhoyansky District ==
Rural localities in Verkhoyansky District:

- Alysardakh
- Bala
- Barylas
- Betenkyos
- Boronuk
- Cholbon
- Chyoryumche
- Engya-Sayylyga
- Khayysardakh
- Machakh
- Metyaki
- Osokhtokh
- Saydy
- Sentachan
- Stolby
- Suordakh
- Sysy-Meyite
- Tala
- Tokuma
- Tomtor, Borulakhsky Rural Okrug
- Tomtor, Dulgalakhsky Rural Okrug
- Ulakhan-Kyuyol
- Ust-Charky
- Yunkyur
- Yurdyuk-Kumakh
- Yuttyakh

== Vilyuysky District ==
Rural localities in Vilyuysky District:

- Arylakh
- Balagachchy
- Betyung
- Chay
- Chineke
- Ebya
- Ilbenge
- Khampa
- Kirovo
- Kyubyainde
- Kyulekyan
- Kyunde
- Lyokyochyon
- Satagay
- Sortol
- Sosnovka
- Starovatovo
- Sydybyl
- Tasagar
- Terbyas
- Tosu
- Tympy
- Usun
- Yekyundyu

== Yakutsk City ==
Rural localities in Yakutsk city of republic significance:

- Khatassy
- Magan
- Namtsyr
- Staraya Tabaga
- Tabaga

== Zhigansky District ==
Rural localities in Zhigansky District:

- Bakhanay
- Bestyakh
- Dzhardzhan
- Kystatyam
- Zhigansk

== See also ==
- Lists of rural localities in Russia
- Djarkhan
