= Abaga =

Abaga may refer to:

== Places ==
- Abaga Falls, waterfall and ecosystem in Mindanao, Philippines
- Abaga (rural locality), several rural localities in the Sakha Republic, Russia
- Abaga tsentralnaya, a selo in Olyokminsky District of the Sakha Republic, Russia
- Abaga, a barangay in Libungan Municipality of Cotabato Province, Philippines

== People ==
- Abaga Mongols, a southern Mongolian ethnic group
- Abaga, alternative name of Abaqa Khan (1234–1282), Mongol ruler of the Persian Ilkhanate
- Jesse Abaga (born 1984), born name of Jesse Jagz, Nigerian hip hop artist
- Jude Abaga (born 1981), Nigerian rapper better known under his stage name M.I Abaga
- Bonifacio Esono Abaga, a participant in 100-meters during the 2009 Jeux de la Francophonie

== Other uses ==
- Abaga language, a nearly extinct Kalam language of Papua New Guinea
- Abaga, native name of the Mandaic alphabet

== See also ==
- Abag Banner (Ābāgā Qí), subdivision of Inner Mongolia, China
