= Ivan Kulbertinov =

Soviet sniper of World War II

- Иван Николаевич Кульбертинов
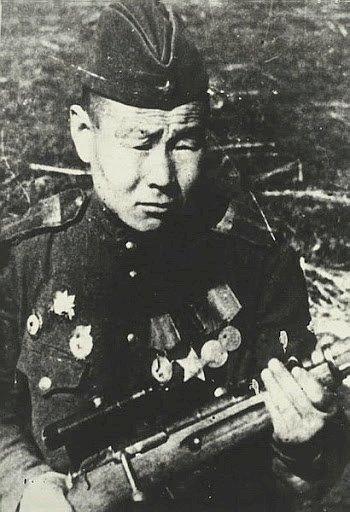
- Born: 7 November 1917; Tyanya, Yakutsk, Russian Republic
- Died: 13 February 1993 (aged 75); Tyanya, Sakha, Russian Federation
- Military career
- Allegiance: Soviet Union
- Branch: Red Army
- Service years: 1942–1946
- Rank: Sergeant Major
- Nicknames: Siberian Midnight; Siberian Owl; Kulbert
- Conflicts: World War II
- Awards: Order of the Red Banner

Ivan Nikolaevich Kulbertinov (Russian: Иван Николаевич Кульбертинов; Yakut: Ньукулай уола Уйбаан Кульбертинов, romanized: Ņukulay uola Uybaan Kulbertinov; 7 November 1917 — 13 February 1993) was a Soviet sniper of World War II with a tally of 487 kills. (Note: Some modern sources indicate a tally as high of 489 kills, although his award documents indicate a tally of 252)

== Early life ==
Kulbertinov was born on 7 November 1917 in Tyanya in the present-day Sakha Republic to an Evenk family of reindeer herders. His father Nikolai Romanovich Kulbertinov died shortly after his birth while his mother Anna Vasilievna was often sick due to chronic illness. Unlike other relatives in Amur and Bodaybo, who were Russified, Kulbertinov's family identified closely with the Yakuts, with at least one ethnic Yakut ancestor.

Kulbertinov did not attend school, but since age ten, he distinguished himself as a particularly successful hunter in the taiga of Olyokminsky District, tutored by his older brother. His skill earned Kulbertinov the nicknames "Pumpee" (Evenki: Пумпээ, lit. 'elusive, round, puffed up like a balloon') by his mother, in reference to his small stature and nimble speed, and "Buskhaa" (Бусхаа, 'mighty one') by his peers, for his strength, reportedly for his ability to kill reindeer with a single punch and split wooden logs in half.

For most of his teenage years, Kulbertinov worked on the Novaya Zhizn collective farm in Tsivilsky District, Chuvash Republic, for which he was recognised as a Stakhanovite. His older brother Nikolai was killed at Leningrad while serving on the Eastern Front in 1939. Three cousins, Ilya, Konstantin, and Innokentiy Kulbertinov also died during the war.

== World War II ==
Kulbertinov was drafted into the Red Army on 12 June 1942, reportedly telling the conscription officer, "I can strike beasts in the eye, now I want to strike fascists". Measured as 153 cm and 53 kg, he underwent training in the Ural Mountains with the 19th Reserve Rifle Regiment and initially deployed as part of a reconnaissance unit. However, when his superiors took notice of his gun skills, he was allowed entry into the 23rd Separate Ski Brigade and on 27 February 1943, he was assigned from his original post near Demyansk to Staraya Russa, where he made his first confirmed kill while fighting the 16th Army of Army Group North. In May 1943, the 23rd Separate Ski Brigade was disbanded and transferred to the 2nd Guards Airborne Division. Kulbertinov participated in the Battle of Kursk, as part of reinforcements to the 7th Guards Regiment, and assigned as a sniper by Major Mikhail Evdokimovich Kozin, who gave personal assignments to him due to his good reputation for proactive displayed during previous engagements. During his first excursion in this role, while paired to provide overwatch to machinegunner Khismatullin, whom he saved when Khismatullin came under fire by German forces at the Brusovets stream. He subsequently saw comparably little combat action, but gathered valuable intelligence from his observation of the enemy from foxholes and other secluded points.

Between 1942 and 1945, Kulbertinov served outside of Moscow, Oryol, and Kursk in western Russia, in Kiev and Vinnitsa in western and eastern Ukraine, as well as in Poland, Germany and Czechoslovakia. In his journal, Kulbertinov wrote that, after spending two days lying in wait, he killed over a dozen Wehrmacht soldiers by firing an armor-piercing round at a pile of ammunition boxes they were unloading from a truck. His high-ranking kills included a Sturmbannführer and two Waffen-SS Obersturmbannführer. During the war, Kulbertinov trained around 35 junior snipers.

One of his students, Andrei Poberezhny, became a regular sniping partner to Kulbertinov. Poberezhny had 85 confirmed enemy kills at the end of the war and received the highest award of Hero of the Soviet Union.

As an Orthodox Christian, Kulbertinov always wore a cross necklace during the war. At a veterans' meeting in Uzhhorod, he later credited the missionaries who converted his ancestors with bringing literacy to his home region.

Wehrmacht troops in Mukachevo nicknamed him "Kulbert" while those in the Eastern Carpathians referred to Kulbertinov by the epithets "Siberian Midnight" (German: Sibirische Mitternacht) or "Siberian Owl" (German: Sibirische Eule; Russian: Сибирская сова). In Chernihiv, a letter found on a dead Schutzstaffel officer indicated that Kulbertinov's presence led a number of German troops to refuse to fight and instead hide in a dugout despite a lack of food and water. At the end of the war, Kulbertinov was still serving with the 2nd Guards Airborne, Proskurov Division in Czechoslovakia.

=== Awards ===
On 18 July 1943, Kulbertinov was awarded his first commendation, the Medal "For Courage", for "eliminating up to 20 Nazis and destroying a machine-gun crew with his sniper rifle near the village of Pervoye Maya". On 1 December 1943, he received an Order of Glory, 3rd Class for killing 113 German soldiers and officers within a two-month period. On 7 June 1944, Kulbertinov received the Order of the Red Banner for killing 59 German soldiers between 8 and 20 October 1943 while at Mevdin near the Dnieper. On 7 July 1944, he received the Medal "For Battle Merit" for his service in the Carpathians and.Czechoslovakia, noting his total enemy kill count as 201, with 10 snipers under his tutorship. On 16 July 1944, Kulbertinov received the Order of the Patriotic War, 2nd Class, for killing twelve enemy troops, including three officers and two snipers, around Yabluniv. In January 1945, the Military Council of the 18th Army of the 4th Ukrainian Front with a personalized rifle, bearing the engraving, "To the best sniper, Senior Sergeant I. N. Kulbertinov, from the Army Military Council. January 1945".

== Post-war ==
A popular legend states that in 1947, shortly after being demobilized, Kulbertinov was accused of being a military impostor by fellow Red Army officers, one to four depending on the version, while wearing his uniform and medals, with the incident taking pace at either a railway cafe in Prague or a restaurant in Irkutsk. Kulbertinov then drew a personalized handgun in response and non-fatally shot those involved. However, Yakutia Daily noted that similar stories are attributed to several Soviet World War II veterans, also conflicting with the fact that Kulbertinov had no criminal record.

From Prague, Kulbertinov was returned to Tyanya in September 1947. He married and had two children, a son and a daughter. From 1948 to 1969, he worked as a hunter for the state-run silver fox farm while also setting up traps to deter wolves from a deer husbandry site. He also served as a guide for geology expeditions. During his first winter back home, Kulbertinov hunted and killed 900 squirrels. During his service at the farm, Kulbertinov killed 2,500 squirrels, 86 sables, 22 moose, and 8 bears. In 1968, in recognition of both his achievements during the war and at work, he was presented with a personalized scoped carbine.

Kulbertinov was the recipient of 12 medals. Besides his rifles, he also received an engraved TT pistol and a GAZ Chaika by the Soviet military. He was also twice considered for Hero of the Soviet Union, but ultimately did not receive the award. In the first instance, the nomination was lost in 1945 as Kulbertinov's unit was being disbanded. Kulbertinov's biographer, S. Valiyeva, wrote that Kulbertinov's recognition efforts were inhibited by "envious rivals and ill-wishers", but he was also unwilling to make constant visits to the offices to avoid bothering with the bureaucratic process.

A school in his home village Tyana, a street in Olyokminsk, and a sports shooting school are named after Kulbertinov. In March 2020, the organisation Tumsuu (Evenki: Тумсуу, lit. 'Cohesion') was founded in Olyokminsk District, seeking to have Kulbertinov awarded the title of Hero of the Soviet Union. Residents of Sakha Republic have repeatedly launched petitions for the Russian government to again consider Kulbertinov for Hero of the Soviet Union. In November 2020, a statue of Kulbertinov was finished in Yakutsk.

In 2017, the Kalashnikov Concern produced 100 limited-edition Dragunov Tigr rifles, eache engraved "To the 100th Anniversary of the Great Sniper I.N. Kulbertinov Pumpee".

In January 2021, the Taas-Yuryakh Neftegazodobycha subsidiary of Rosneft named a gas field in Sakha Republic after Kulbertinov.
