= Abaga (rural locality) =

Abaga (Russian: Абага) is the name of several rural localities in the Sakha Republic, Russia:

- Abaga, Amginsky District, Sakha Republic, a selo in Abaginsky Rural Okrug of Amginsky District; 61°02′55″N 132°16′43″E
- Abaga, Olyokminsky District, Sakha Republic, a selo in Abaginsky Rural Okrug of Olyokminsky District; 60°19′25″N 120°01′10″E

== See also ==
- Abaga tsentralnaya, a selo in Abaginsky Rural Okrug of Olyokminsky District
- Abaga horse, a type of Chinese Mongolian horse
