= Tegen =

Tegen Тэгэн
- Selo
- Interactive map of Tegen
- Location of Tegen Tegen (Sakha Republic)
- Coordinates: 61°01′N 119°12′E
- Country: Russia
- Federal subject: Sakha Republic
- Administrative district: Olyokminsky District
- Rural okrugSelsoviet: Kyachchinsky Rural Okrug

Population
  - Estimate (2002): 20 )

Municipal status
  - Municipal district: Olyokminsky Municipal District
  - Rural settlement: Kyachchinsky Rural Settlement
- Time zone: UTC+
- Postal code: 678108
- OKTMO ID: 98641434116

Tegen (Russian: Тэгэн; Yakut: Төгүөн, Tögüön) is a rural locality (a selo), one of four settlements, in addition to Kyachchi, Kilier and Olom, in Kyachchinsky Rural Okrug of Olyokminsky District in the Sakha Republic, Russia. It is located 150 kilometers (93 mi) from Olyokminsk, the administrative center of the district and 150 kilometers (93 mi) from Kyachchi. Its population as of the 2002 Census was 20.
