= Kuranda, Russia =

Kuranda Куранда
- Selo
- Interactive map of Kuranda
- Location of Kuranda Kuranda (Sakha Republic)
- Coordinates: 60°24′N 120°16′E
- Country: Russia
- Federal subject: Sakha Republic
- Administrative district: Olyokminsky District
- Rural okrugSelsoviet: Malzhagarsky Rural Okrug

Population
  - Estimate (2002): 14 )

Municipal status
  - Municipal district: Olyokminsky Municipal District
  - Rural settlement: Malzhagarsky Rural Settlement
- Time zone: UTC+
- Postal code: 678116
- OKTMO ID: 98641435106

Kuranda (Russian: Куранда) is a rural locality (a selo), one of three settlements, in addition to Yunkyur and Tyubya, in Malzhagarsky Rural Okrug of Olyokminsky District in the Sakha Republic, Russia. It is located 11 kilometers (6.8 mi) from Olyokminsk, the administrative center of the district and 4 kilometers (2.5 mi) from Yunkyur. Its population as of the 2002 Census was 14.
