= Biryuk (river) =

River in Yakutia (Sakha Republic), Russia

Biryuk Бирюк / Бүүрүк
- Lena basin with the Biryuk in the middle

- Mouth location in Yakutia, Russia

Location
- Country: Russia

Physical characteristics
- Source
  - location: Lena Plateau
  - coordinates: 61°32′29″N 119°05′11″E
- Mouth: Lena
  - location: Near Biryuk village
  - coordinates: 60°15′14″N 119°36′10″E
- Length: 267 km (166 mi)
- Basin size: 9,710 km^{2} (3,750 sq mi)
- Discharge
  - average: 23 m^{3}/s (810 cu ft/s)

Basin features
- Progression: Lena→ Laptev Sea

The Biryuk (Russian: Бирюк; Yakut: Бүүрүк, Büürük) is a river in Yakutia (Sakha Republic), Russia. It is a tributary of the Lena with a length of 267 kilometres (166 mi) and a drainage basin area of 9,710 square kilometres (3,750 mi^{2}).

The river flows across an uninhabited area of the Olyokminsky District. Biryuk village is located by its left bank, close to its confluence with the Lena 52 kilometres (32 mi) from Olyokminsk.

== Course ==
The Biryuk is a left tributary of the Lena. It is formed in the Lena Plateau. The river heads in a roughly southern direction across a taiga area. In its lower course it bends to the south before the Lena floodplain and flows slowly and meandering in a swampy channel. Finally it meets the Lena 2,160 kilometres (1,340 mi) from its mouth near Biryuk village and 18 kilometres (11 mi) downstream from the mouth of the Cherendey.

The largest tributary of the Biryuk is the 144 kilometres (89 mi) long Melichan (Меличан) that joins it from the right. There are lakes in its basin, including relatively large Ebye Kyuel. The river freezes yearly between October and May.

== See also ==
- List of rivers of Russia
