= Malykan =

Malykhan Малыкан
- Selo
- Interactive map of Malykhan
- Location of Malykhan Malykhan (Sakha Republic)
- Coordinates: 60°41′N 124°42′E
- Country: Russia
- Federal subject: Sakha Republic
- Administrative district: Olyokminsky District
- Rural okrugSelsoviet: Sanyyakhtakhsky Rural Okrug

Population
  - Estimate (2002): 132 )

Municipal status
  - Municipal district: Olyokminsky Municipal District
  - Rural settlement: Sanyyakhtakhsky Rural Settlement
- Time zone: UTC+
- Postal code: 678134
- OKTMO ID: 98641460111

Malykhan (Russian: Малыкан; Yakut: Маалыкаан, Maalıkaan) is a rural locality (a selo), one of three settlements, in addition to Sanyyakhtakh, Alexeyevka and Markha, in Sanyyakhtakhsky Rural Okrug of Olyokminsky District in the Sakha Republic, Russia. It is located 277 kilometers (172 mi) from Olyokminsk, the administrative center of the district and 42 kilometers (26 mi) from Daban. Its population as of the 2002 Census was 132.
