= Alexeyevka, Sakha Republic =

Alexeyevka Алексеевка
- Selo
- Interactive map of Alexeyevka
- Location of Alexeyevka Alexeyevka (Sakha Republic)
- Coordinates: 60°26′N 124°14′E
- Country: Russia
- Federal subject: Sakha Republic
- Administrative district: Olyokminsky District
- Rural okrugSelsoviet: Sanyyakhtakhsky Rural Okrug
- Elevation: 130 m (430 ft)

Population
  - Estimate (2002): 15 )

Municipal status
  - Municipal district: Olyokminsky Municipal District
  - Rural settlement: Sanyyakhtakhsky Rural Settlement
- Time zone: UTC+
- Postal code: 678108
- OKTMO ID: 98641460106

Alexeyevka (Russian: Алексеевка) is a rural locality (a selo), one of three settlements, in addition to Sanyyakhtakh, Malykhan and Markha, in Sanyyakhtakhsky Rural Okrug of Olyokminsky District in the Sakha Republic, Russia. It is located 265 kilometers (165 mi) from Olyokminsk, the administrative center of the district and 30 kilometers (19 mi) from Sanyyakhtakh. Its population as of the 2002 Census was 15.
