= Solyanka (rural locality) =

Solyanka (Russian: Солянка) is the name of several rural localities in Russia:

- Solyanka, Akhtubinsky District, Astrakhan Oblast, a selo in Pologozaymishchensky Selsoviet of Akhtubinsky District in Astrakhan Oblast; 48°31′N 45°53′E
- Solyanka, Narimanovsky District, Astrakhan Oblast, a selo in Solyansky Selsoviet of Narimanovsky District in Astrakhan Oblast; 46°23′N 48°1′E
- Solyanka, Irkutsk Oblast, a village in Ekhirit-Bulagatsky District of Irkutsk Oblast
- Solyanka, Sakha Republic, a selo in Solyansky Rural Okrug of Olyokminsky District in the Sakha Republic
- Solyanka, Krasnokutsky District, Saratov Oblast, a selo in Krasnokutsky District of Saratov Oblast
- Solyanka, Novouzensky District, Saratov Oblast, a settlement in Novouzensky District of Saratov Oblast
- Solyanka, Ozinsky District, Saratov Oblast, a selo in Ozinsky District of Saratov Oblast
- Solyanka, Tyumen Oblast, a village in Yurovsky Rural Okrug of Uvatsky District in Tyumen Oblast
- Solyanka, Bykovsky District, Volgograd Oblast, a khutor under the administrative jurisdiction of Bykovo Urban-Type Settlement in Bykovsky District of Volgograd Oblast
- Solyanka, Svetloyarsky District, Volgograd Oblast, a selo in Chervlenovsky Selsoviet of Svetloyarsky District in Volgograd Oblast
