= Olyokminsky =

Olyokminsky (masculine), Olyokminskaya (feminine), or Olyokminskoye (neuter) may refer to:

- Olyokminsky District, a district of the Sakha Republic, Russia
- Olyokminsky (rural locality), a rural locality (a selo) in Olyokminsky District of the Sakha Republic, Russia
