= Berdinka =

Berdinka Бердинка
- Selo
- Interactive map of Berdinka
- Location of Berdinka Berdinka (Sakha Republic)
- Coordinates: 60°16′N 119°56′E
- Country: Russia
- Federal subject: Sakha Republic
- Administrative district: Olyokminsky District
- Rural okrugSelsoviet: Neryuktyayinsky 2-y Rural Okrug

Population
  - Estimate (2002): 34 )

Municipal status
  - Municipal district: Olyokminsky Municipal District
  - Rural settlement: Neryuktyayinsky 2-y Rural Settlement
- Time zone: UTC+
- Postal code: 678105
- OKTMO ID: 98641450106

Berdinka (Russian: Бердинка; Yakut: Бэрдиҥкэ, Berdiŋke) is a rural locality (a selo), one of three settlements, in addition to Neryuktyayinsk 2-y and Kholgo, in Neryuktyayinsky 2-y Rural Okrug of Olyokminsky District in the Sakha Republic, Russia. It is located 34 kilometers (21 mi) from Olyokminsk, the administrative center of the district and 3 kilometers (1.9 mi) from Neryuktyayinsk 2-y . Its population as of the 2002 Census was 34.
