= Selivanovo, Sakha Republic =

Selivanovo Селиваново
- Selo
- Interactive map of Selivanovo
- Location of Selivanovo Selivanovo (Sakha Republic)
- Coordinates: 60°23′N 120°31′E
- Country: Russia
- Federal subject: Sakha Republic
- Administrative district: Olyokminsky District
- TownSelsoviet: Olyokminsk

Population
  - Estimate (2002): 630 )

Municipal status
  - Municipal district: Olyokminsky Municipal District
  - Urban settlement: Olyokminsk Urban Settlement
- Time zone: UTC+
- Postal code: 678100
- OKTMO ID: 98641101121

Selivanovo (Russian: Селиваново) is a rural locality (a selo) under the administrative jurisdiction of the Town of Olyokminsk in Olyokminsky District of the Sakha Republic, Russia, located 7 kilometers (4.3 mi) from Olyokminsk. Its population as of the 2002 Census was 630.
