= Kharyyalakh, Olyokminsky District, Sakha Republic =

Kharyyalakh Харыялах
- Selo
- Interactive map of Kharyyalakh
- Location of Kharyyalakh Kharyyalakh (Sakha Republic)
- Coordinates: 60°35′N 121°04′E
- Country: Russia
- Federal subject: Sakha Republic
- Administrative district: Olyokminsky District
- Rural okrugSelsoviet: Solyansky Rural Okrug

Population
  - Estimate (2002): 0 )

Municipal status
  - Municipal district: Olyokminsky Municipal District
  - Rural settlement: Solyansky Rural Settlement
- Time zone: UTC+
- Postal code: 678116
- OKTMO ID: 98641465106

Kharyyalakh (Russian: Харыялах; Yakut: Харыйалаах, Xarıyalaax) is a rural locality (a selo), one of two settlements, in addition to Solyanka, in Solyansky Rural Okrug of Olyokminsky District in the Sakha Republic, Russia. It is located 52 kilometers (32 mi) from Olyokminsk, the administrative center of the district and 26 kilometers (16 mi) from Solyanka. Its population as of the 2002 Census was 0.
