= Neryuktyayinsk 1-y =

Neryuktyayinsk 1-y Нерюктяйинск 1-й
- Selo
- Interactive map of Neryuktyayinsk 1-y
- Location of Neryuktyayinsk 1-y Neryuktyayinsk 1-y (Sakha Republic)
- Coordinates: 60°15′N 119°41′E
- Country: Russia
- Federal subject: Sakha Republic
- Administrative district: Olyokminsky District
- Rural okrugSelsoviet: Neryuktyayinsky 1-y Rural Okrug

Population
  - Estimate (2002): 1,055 )

Administrative status
  - Capital of: Neryuktyayinsky 1-y Rural Okrug

Municipal status
  - Municipal district: Olyokminsky Municipal District
  - Rural settlement: Neryuktyayinsky 1-y Rural Settlement
  - Capital of: Neryuktyayinsky 1-y Rural Settlement
- Time zone: UTC+
- Postal code: 678106
- OKTMO ID: 98641445101

Neryuktyayinsk 1-y (Russian: Нерюктяйинск 1-й) is a rural locality (a selo), the administrative centre of and one of four settlements, in addition to Biryuk, Kudu-Byas and Tas-Anna, in Neryuktyayinsky 1-y Rural Okrug of Olyokminsky District in the Sakha Republic, Russia. It is located 50 kilometers (31 mi) from Olyokminsk, the administrative center of the district. Its population as of the 2002 Census was 1,055.
