= Dikimdya, Olyokminsky District, Sakha Republic =

Dikimdya Дикимдя
- Selo
- Interactive map of Dikimdya
- Location of Dikimdya Dikimdya (Sakha Republic)
- Coordinates: 59°02′N 121°49′E
- Country: Russia
- Federal subject: Sakha Republic
- Administrative district: Olyokminsky District
- Rural okrugSelsoviet: Kindigirsky National Rural Okrug

Population
  - Estimate (2002): 4 )

Municipal status
  - Municipal district: Olyokminsky Municipal District
  - Rural settlement: Kindigirsky National Rural Settlement
- Time zone: UTC+
- Postal code: 678113
- OKTMO ID: 98641425106

Dikimdya (Russian: Дикимдя; Yakut: Дьикимдэ, Cikimde) is a rural locality (a selo), one of two settlements, in addition to Kudu-Kyuyol, in Kindigirsky National Rural Okrug of Olyokminsky District in the Sakha Republic, Russia. It is located 250 kilometers (160 mi) from Olyokminsk, the administrative center of the district and 4 kilometers (2.5 mi) from Kudu-Kyuyol. Its population as of the 2002 Census was 4.

== Climate ==
Climate data for Dikimdya, Olyokminsky District
Month	Jan	Feb	Mar	Apr	May	Jun	Jul	Aug	Sep	Oct	Nov	Dec	Year
Record high °C (°F)	−5.0 (23.0)	3.7 (38.7)	14.0 (57.2)	19.0 (66.2)	32.4 (90.3)	37.2 (99.0)	39.0 (102.2)	37.7 (99.9)	28.1 (82.6)	18.0 (64.4)	6.1 (43.0)	1.0 (33.8)	39.0 (102.2)
Mean daily maximum °C (°F)	−29.5 (−21.1)	−22.3 (−8.1)	−7.4 (18.7)	4.1 (39.4)	13.7 (56.7)	22.2 (72.0)	25.5 (77.9)	22.5 (72.5)	12.9 (55.2)	−0.5 (31.1)	−16.8 (1.8)	−26.3 (−15.3)	−0.7 (30.7)
Daily mean °C (°F)	−34.6 (−30.3)	−30.0 (−22.0)	−17.9 (−0.2)	−3.8 (25.2)	6.4 (43.5)	14.4 (57.9)	17.4 (63.3)	14.1 (57.4)	5.7 (42.3)	−6.1 (21.0)	−22.4 (−8.3)	−31.1 (−24.0)	−7.9 (17.8)
Mean daily minimum °C (°F)	−40.5 (−40.9)	−38.3 (−36.9)	−29.1 (−20.4)	−14.0 (6.8)	−2.3 (27.9)	5.3 (41.5)	8.2 (46.8)	5.8 (42.4)	−1.3 (29.7)	−12.4 (9.7)	−29.1 (−20.4)	−37.2 (−35.0)	−15.9 (3.4)
Record low °C (°F)	−56.1 (−69.0)	−57.8 (−72.0)	−48.9 (−56.0)	−37.8 (−36.0)	−20.0 (−4.0)	−5.0 (23.0)	−2.2 (28.0)	−5.2 (22.6)	−16.0 (3.2)	−35.0 (−31.0)	−47.0 (−52.6)	−55.0 (−67.0)	−57.8 (−72.0)
Average precipitation mm (inches)	15.6 (0.61)	15.4 (0.61)	16.0 (0.63)	38.0 (1.50)	49.7 (1.96)	92.6 (3.65)	70.8 (2.79)	53.0 (2.09)	60.5 (2.38)	54.2 (2.13)	19.9 (0.78)	21.3 (0.84)	507.0 (19.96)
Average precipitation days	21.9	19.0	14.7	8.0	9.6	10.3	5.2	9.6	13.0	15.8	18.7	20.3	166.1
