= Biryuk (rural locality) =

Biryuk Бирюк
- Selo
- Interactive map of Biryuk
- Location of Biryuk Biryuk (Sakha Republic)
- Coordinates: 60°13′N 119°38′E
- Country: Russia
- Federal subject: Sakha Republic
- Administrative district: Olyokminsky District
- Rural okrugSelsoviet: Neryuktyayinsky 1-y Rural Okrug

Population
  - Estimate (2002): 95 )

Municipal status
  - Municipal district: Olyokminsky Municipal District
  - Rural settlement: Neryuktyayinsky 1-y Rural Settlement
- Time zone: UTC+
- Postal code: 678106
- OKTMO ID: 98641445106

Biryuk (Russian: Бирюк; Yakut: Бүүрүк, Büürük) is a rural locality (a selo), one of four settlements, in addition to Neryuktyayinsk 1-y, Kudu-Byas and Tas-Anna, in Neryuktyayinsky 1-y Rural Okrug of Olyokminsky District in the Sakha Republic, Russia. It is located 52 kilometers (32 mi) from Olyokminsk, the administrative center of the district and 2 kilometers (1.2 mi) from Neryuktyayinsk 1-y. Its population as of the 2002 Census was 10.
