= Khating-Tumul =

Khatyng-Tumul Хатынг-Тумул
- Selo
- Interactive map of Khatyng-Tumul
- Location of Khatyng-Tumul Khatyng-Tumul (Sakha Republic)
- Coordinates: 60°35′N 122°53′E
- Country: Russia
- Federal subject: Sakha Republic
- Administrative district: Olyokminsky District
- Rural okrugSelsoviet: Uritsky Rural Okrug

Population
  - Estimate (2002): 10 )

Municipal status
  - Municipal district: Olyokminsky Municipal District
  - Rural settlement: Uritsky Rural Settlement
- Time zone: UTC+
- Postal code: 678135
- OKTMO ID: 98641480106

Khatyng-Tumul (Russian: Хатынг-Тумул) is a rural locality (a selo), one of two settlements, in addition to Uritskoye, in Uritsky Rural Okrug of Olyokminsky District in the Sakha Republic, Russia. It is located 160 kilometers (99 mi) from Olyokminsk, the administrative center of the district and 28 kilometers (17 mi) from Uritsky. Its population as of the 2002 Census was 10.
