= Tinnaya =

Tinnaya Тинная
- Selo
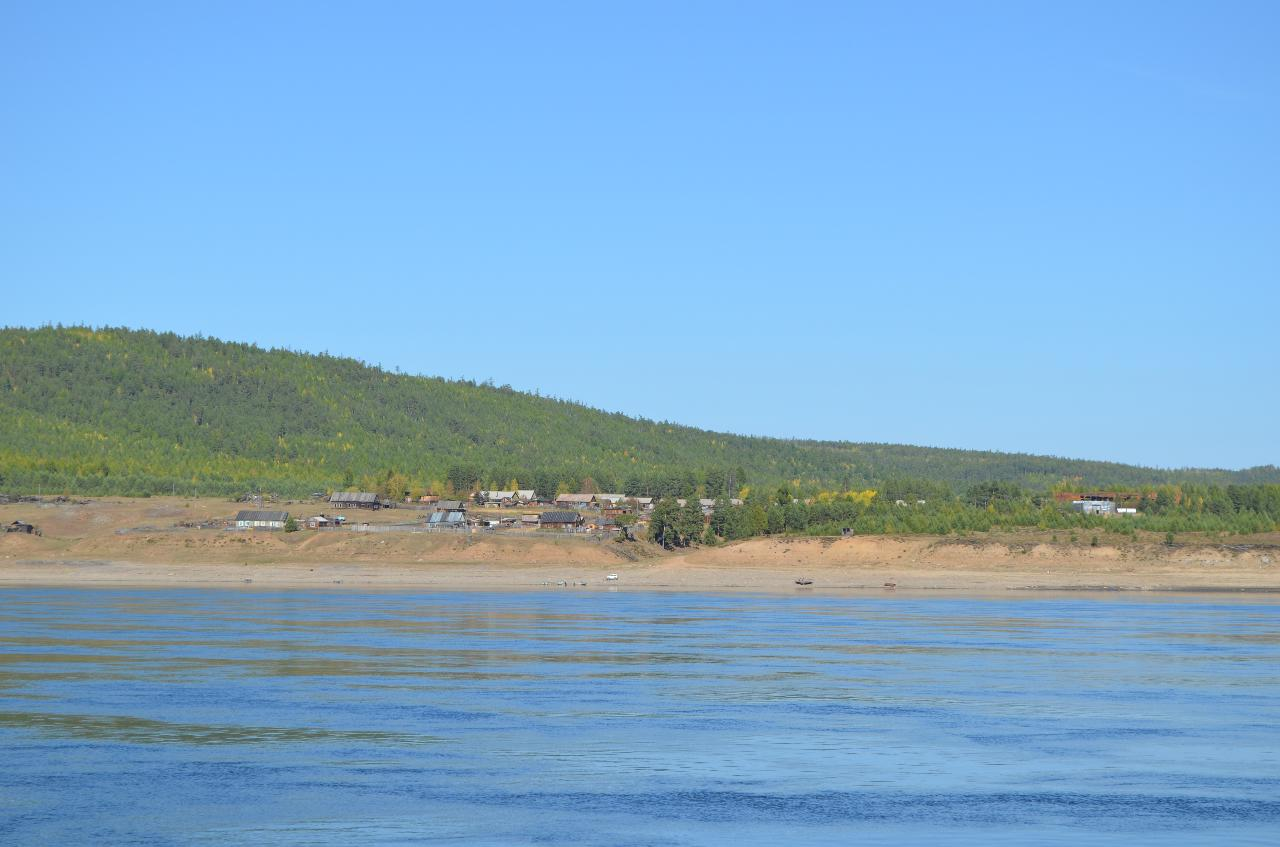
- View of Tinnaya from the Lena River
- Interactive map of Tinnaya
- Location of Tinnaya Tinnaya (Sakha Republic)
- Coordinates: 60°21′N 116°57′E
- Country: Russia
- Federal subject: Sakha Republic
- Administrative district: Olyokminsky District
- Rural okrugSelsoviet: Chapayevsky Rural Okrug

Population
  - Estimate (2002): 85 )

Municipal status
  - Municipal district: Olyokminsky Municipal District
  - Rural settlement: Chapayevsky Rural Settlement
- Time zone: UTC+
- Postal code: 678124
- OKTMO ID: 98641487106

Tinnaya (Russian: Ти́нная) is a rural locality (a selo) in Chapayevsky Rural Okrug of Olyokminsky District in the Sakha Republic, Russia, located 285 kilometers (177 mi) from Olyokminsk, the administrative center of the district and 27 kilometers (17 mi) from Chapayevo, the administrative center of the rural okrug. Its population as of the 2002 Census was 85.
