= Kochegarovo =

Kochegarovo Кочегарово
- Selo
- Interactive map of Kochegarovo
- Location of Kochegarovo Kochegarovo (Sakha Republic)
- Coordinates: 59°56′N 118°53′E
- Country: Russia
- Federal subject: Sakha Republic
- Administrative district: Olyokminsky District
- Rural okrugSelsoviet: Dabansky Rural Okrug

Population
  - Estimate (2002): 10 )

Municipal status
  - Municipal district: Olyokminsky Municipal District
  - Rural settlement: Dabansky Rural Settlement
- Time zone: UTC+
- Postal code: 678120
- OKTMO ID: 98641410106

Kochegarovo (Russian: Кочегарово) is a rural locality (a selo), one of three settlements, in addition to Daban and Cherendey, in Dabansky Rural Okrug of Olyokminsky District in the Sakha Republic, Russia. It is located 109 kilometers (68 mi) from Olyokminsk, the administrative center of the district and 11 kilometers (6.8 mi) from Daban. Its population as of the 2002 Census was 10.
