= Markha =

Markha may refer to:

- Markha, a former village, incorporated into the city of Yakutsk, Sakha Republic, Russia
- Markha, Olyokminsky District, a village in Olyokminsky District, Sakha Republic, Russia
- Markha (Vilyuy), a tributary of the Vilyuy in the Sakha Republic, Russia
- Markha (Lena), a tributary of the Lena in the Sakha Republic, Russia
- Markha River (India), a river in Ladakh, India
