= Neftebaza, Olyokminsky District, Sakha Republic =

Neftebaza Нефтебаза
- Selo
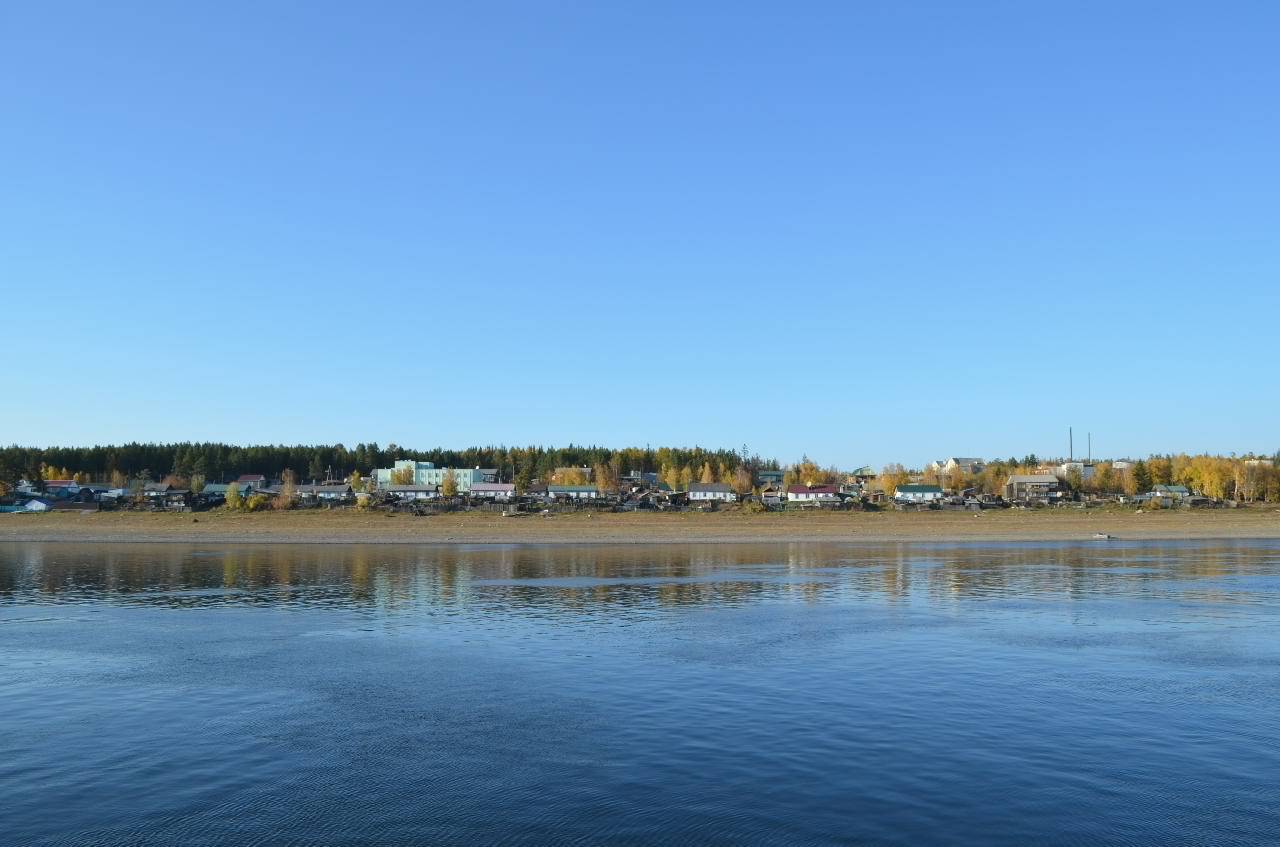
- View of Neftebaza from the Lena River
- Interactive map of Neftebaza
- Location of Neftebaza Neftebaza (Sakha Republic)
- Coordinates: 60°22′41″N 120°35′35″E
- Country: Russia
- Federal subject: Sakha Republic
- Administrative district: Olyokminsky District
- TownSelsoviet: Olyokminsk

Population
  - Estimate (2002): 259 )

Municipal status
  - Municipal district: Olyokminsky Municipal District
  - Urban settlement: Olyokminsk Urban Settlement
- Time zone: UTC+
- Postal code: 678100
- OKTMO ID: 98641101116

Neftebaza (Russian: Нефтебаза) is a rural locality (a selo), one of five settlements, in addition to Olyokminsk, the administrative centre of the settlement, Zaton LORPa, Aviaport and Selivanovo in the Town of Olyokminsk of Olyokminsky District in the Sakha Republic, Russia. It is located 12 kilometers (7.5 mi) from Olyokminsk. Its population as of the 2002 Census was 259.
