= Innyakh =

Innyakh Иннях
- Selo
- Interactive map of Innyakh
- Location of Innyakh Innyakh (Sakha Republic)
- Coordinates: 59°48′N 118°28′E
- Country: Russia
- Federal subject: Sakha Republic
- Administrative district: Olyokminsky District
- Rural okrugSelsoviet: Delgeysky Rural Okrug
- Elevation: 147 m (482 ft)

Population
  - Estimate (2002): 118 )

Municipal status
  - Municipal district: Olyokminsky Municipal District
  - Rural settlement: Delgeysky Rural Settlement
- Time zone: UTC+
- Postal code: 678126
- OKTMO ID: 98641415106

Innyakh (Russian: Иннях; Yakut: Иинээххэ, romanized: Iineexxe) is a rural locality (a selo) in Delgeysky Rural Okrug of Olyokminsky District in the Sakha Republic, Russia, located 139 kilometers (86 mi) from Olyokminsk, the administrative center of the district and 14 kilometers (8.7 mi) from Delgey, the administrative center of the rural okrug. Its population as of the 2002 Census was 118.
