= Cherendey (river) =

River in Yakutia (Sakha Republic), Russia

Cherendey Черендей / Чэрэндэй
- Lena basin with the Cherendey in the center

- Mouth location in Yakutia, Russia

Location
- Country: Russia

Physical characteristics
- Source
  - location: Lena Plateau
  - coordinates: 60°28′22″N 118°29′10″E
- Mouth: Lena
  - location: Near Cherendey village
  - coordinates: 60°11′10″N 119°17′27″E
  - elevation: 397 m (1,302 ft)
- Length: 226 km (140 mi)
- Basin size: 2,910 km^{2} (1,120 sq mi)

Basin features
- Progression: Lena→ Laptev Sea

The Cherendey (Russian: Черендей; Yakut: Чэрэндэй, Çerendey) is a river in Yakutia (Sakha Republic), Russia. It is a tributary of the Lena with a length of 226 kilometres (140 mi) and a drainage basin area of 2,910 square kilometres (1,120 mi^{2}).

The river flows across an uninhabited area of the Olyokminsky District. Abandoned Cherendey village is located by the left bank of the Lena, close to its confluence.

== Course ==
The Cherendey is a left tributary of the Lena. It has its source in a small lake of the Lena Plateau located at a height of 397 m (1,302 ft). The river heads in a roughly southeastern direction across a taiga area. In mid course it bends to the northeast and flows slowly and meandering in a wide, swampy valley. Finally it meets the Lena 2,178 kilometres (1,353 mi) from its mouth near Cherendey village and 18 kilometres (11 mi) upstream from the mouth of the Biryuk.

The largest tributaries of the Cherendey are the 50 kilometres (31 mi) long Nuuchcha-Tanyita (Нуучча-Таныыта) and the 41 kilometres (25 mi) long Onkuchakh-Yurekh (Онкучах-Юрэх) that join it from the left. There are lakes and swamps in the upper part of its basin. The river freezes yearly between October and May.

== See also ==
- List of rivers of Russia
