= Kholgo =

Kholgo Холго
- Selo
- Interactive map of Kholgo
- Location of Kholgo Kholgo (Sakha Republic)
- Coordinates: 60°17′N 119°59′E
- Country: Russia
- Federal subject: Sakha Republic
- Administrative district: Olyokminsky District
- Rural okrugSelsoviet: Neryuktyayinsky 2-y Rural Okrug

Population
  - Estimate (2002): 79 )

Municipal status
  - Municipal district: Olyokminsky Municipal District
  - Rural settlement: Neryuktyayinsky 2-y Rural Settlement
- Time zone: UTC+
- Postal code: 678105
- OKTMO ID: 98641450111

Kholgo (Russian: Холго) is a rural locality (a selo), one of three settlements, in addition to Neryuktyayinsk 2-y and Berdinka, in Neryuktyayinsky 2-y Rural Okrug of Olyokminsky District in the Sakha Republic, Russia. It is located 32 kilometers (20 mi) from Olyokminsk, the administrative center of the district and 5 kilometers (3.1 mi) from Neryuktyayinsk 2-y. Its population as of the 2002 Census was 79.
