= Macha, Russia =

Macha (Russian: Мача) is the name of several rural localities in Russia:

- Macha, Penza Oblast, a selo in Machinsky Selsoviet of Tamalinsky District in Penza Oblast
- Macha, Sakha Republic, a selo in Machinsky Rural Okrug of Olyokminsky District in the Sakha Republic
