= Aviaport, Olyokminsky District, Sakha Republic =

Aviaport Авиапорт
- Selo
- Interactive map of Aviaport
- Location of Aviaport Aviaport (Sakha Republic)
- Coordinates: 60°23′46″N 120°28′36″E
- Country: Russia
- Federal subject: Sakha Republic
- Administrative district: Olyokminsky District
- TownSelsoviet: Olyokminsk

Population
  - Estimate (2002): 480 )

Municipal status
  - Municipal district: Olyokminsky Municipal District
  - Urban settlement: Olyokminsk Urban Settlement
- Time zone: UTC+
- Postal code: 678100
- OKTMO ID: 98641101106

Aviaport (Russian: Авиапорт) is a rural locality (a selo), one of five settlements, in addition to Olyokminsk, the administrative centre of the settlement, Zaton LORPa, Neftebaza and Selivanovo in the Town of Olyokminsk of Olyokminsky District in the Sakha Republic, Russia. It is located 5 kilometers (3.1 mi) from Olyokminsk. Its population as of the 2002 Census was 480.
