= Arangastakh =

Arangastakh Арангастах
- Selo
- Interactive map of Arangastakh
- Location of Arangastakh Arangastakh (Sakha Republic)
- Coordinates: 63°11′04″N 117°53′26″E
- Country: Russia
- Federal subject: Sakha Republic
- Administrative district: Nyurbinsky District
- Rural okrugSelsoviet: Kyundyadinsky Rural Okrug

Population
  - Estimate (2002): 53 )

Municipal status
  - Municipal district: Nyurbinsky Municipal District
  - Rural settlement: Kyundyadinsky Rural Settlement
- Time zone: UTC+
- Postal code: 678471
- OKTMO ID: 98626425106

Arangastakh (Russian: Арангастах; Yakut: Араҥастаах, Araŋastaax) is a rural locality (a selo), one of two settlements, in addition to Kyunyade, the administrative centre of the Rural Okrug, in Kyundyadinsky Rural Okrug of Nyurbinsky District in the Sakha Republic, Russia. It is located 30 kilometers (19 mi) from Nyurba, the administrative center of the district and 15 kilometers (9.3 mi) from Kyunyade. Its population as of the 2002 Census was 53.
