= Olom =

Olom Олом
- Selo
- Interactive map of Olom
- Location of Olom Olom (Sakha Republic)
- Coordinates: 60°45′N 119°28′E
- Country: Russia
- Federal subject: Sakha Republic
- Administrative district: Olyokminsky District
- Rural okrugSelsoviet: Kyachchinsky Rural Okrug

Population (2010 Census)
  - Total: 39
  - Estimate (2021): 1 (−97.4%)

Municipal status
  - Municipal district: Olyokminsky Municipal District
  - Rural settlement: Kyachchinsky Rural Settlement
- Time zone: UTC+
- Postal code: 678108
- OKTMO ID: 98641434111

Olom (Russian: Олом; Yakut: Олом) is a rural locality (a selo) in Kyachchinsky Rural Okrug of Olyokminsky District in the Sakha Republic, Russia, located 90 kilometers (56 mi) from Olyokminsk, the administrative center of the district, and 70 kilometers (43 mi) from Kyachchi, the administrative center of the rural okrug. Its population as of the 2010 Census was 39; up from 11 recorded in the 2002 Census.
