= Macha, Sakha Republic =

Macha Мача
- Selo
- Interactive map of Macha
- Location of Macha Macha (Sakha Republic)
- Coordinates: 59°54′N 117°36′E
- Country: Russia
- Federal subject: Sakha Republic
- Administrative district: Olyokminsky District
- Rural okrugSelsoviet: Machinsky Rural Okrug

Population (2010 Census)
  - Total: 1,089
  - Estimate (2021): 357 (−67.2%)

Administrative status
  - Capital of: Machinsky Rural Okrug

Municipal status
  - Municipal district: Olyokminsky Municipal District
  - Rural settlement: Machinsky Rural Settlement
  - Capital of: Machinsky Rural Settlement
- Time zone: UTC+
- Postal code: 678123
- OKTMO ID: 98641440101

Macha (Russian: Мача; Yakut: Маача, romanized: Mâça) is a rural locality (a selo), the only inhabited locality, and the administrative center of Machinsky Rural Okrug of Olyokminsky District in the Sakha Republic, Russia. Its population as of the 2010 Census was 1,089, of whom 560 were male and 529 female, up from 403 as recorded during the 2002 Census.

== Geography ==
Macha is located at the southwestern end of Yakutia, 205 kilometers (127 mi) from Olyokminsk, the administrative center of the district. It lies on the left bank of the Lena River, downstream from the confluence of the Bolshoy Patom River.
