= Ulakhan-Mungku =

Ulakhan-Mungku Улахан-Мунгку
- Selo
- Interactive map of Ulakhan-Mungku
- Location of Ulakhan-Mungku Ulakhan-Mungku (Sakha Republic)
- Coordinates: 60°26′N 120°12′E
- Country: Russia
- Federal subject: Sakha Republic
- Administrative district: Olyokminsky District
- Rural okrugSelsoviet: Ulakhan-Mungkunsky Rural Okrug

Population (2010 Census)
  - Total: 394
  - Estimate (2021): 370 (−6.1%)

Administrative status
  - Capital of: Ulakhan-Mungkunsky Rural Okrug

Municipal status
  - Municipal district: Olyokminsky Municipal District
  - Rural settlement: Ulakhan-Mungkunsky Rural Settlement
  - Capital of: Ulakhan-Mungkunsky Rural Settlement
- Time zone: UTC+
- Postal code: 678116
- OKTMO ID: 98641477101

Ulakhan-Mungku (Russian: Улахан-Мунгку; Yakut: Улахан Муҥку, Ulaxan Muŋku) is a rural locality (a selo) and the administrative center of Ulakhan-Mungkunsky Rural Okrug in Olyokminsky District of the Sakha Republic, Russia, located 15 kilometers (9.3 mi) from Olyokminsk, the administrative center of the district. Its population as of the 2010 Census was 394, down from 423 recorded in the 2002 Census.
