= Uolbut =

Uolbut Уолбут
- Selo
- Interactive map of Uolbut
- Location of Uolbut Uolbut (Sakha Republic)
- Coordinates: 59°58′N 119°55′E
- Country: Russia
- Federal subject: Sakha Republic
- Administrative district: Olyokminsky District
- Rural okrugSelsoviet: Zharkhansky Rural Okrug

Population
  - Estimate (2002): 313 )

Municipal status
  - Municipal district: Olyokminsky Municipal District
  - Rural settlement: Zharkhansky Rural Settlement
- Time zone: UTC+
- Postal code: 678116
- OKTMO ID: 98641420111

Uolbut (Russian: Уолбут; Yakut: Уолбут) is a rural locality (a selo) in Zharkhansky Rural Okrug of Olyokminsky District in the Sakha Republic, Russia, located 93 kilometers (58 mi) from Olyokminsk, the administrative center of the district and 3 kilometers (1.9 mi) from Tokko, the administrative center of the rural okrug. Its population as of the 2002 Census was 313. The closest airport to the city center of Uolbut is Cherskiy Airport, at approximately 480 kilometers away.
