= Kiliyer =

Kiliyer Килиер
- Selo
- Interactive map of Kiliyer
- Location of Kiliyer Kiliyer (Sakha Republic)
- Coordinates: 61°01′N 119°17′E
- Country: Russia
- Federal subject: Sakha Republic
- Administrative district: Olyokminsky District
- Rural okrugSelsoviet: Kyachchinsky Rural Okrug

Population
  - Estimate (2002): 6 )

Municipal status
  - Municipal district: Olyokminsky Municipal District
  - Rural settlement: Kyachchinsky Rural Settlement
- Time zone: UTC+
- Postal code: 678108
- OKTMO ID: 98641434106

Kiliyer (Russian: Килиер; Yakut: Килиэр, Kilier) is a rural locality (a selo) in Kyachchinsky Rural Okrug of Olyokminsky District in the Sakha Republic, Russia, located 179 kilometers (111 mi) from Olyokminsk, the administrative center of the district and 140 kilometers (87 mi) from Kyachchi, the administrative center of the rural okrug. Its population as of the 2002 Census was 6.
