= Troitsk, Olyokminsky District, Sakha Republic =

Troitsk Троицк
- Selo
- Interactive map of Troitsk
- Location of Troitsk Troitsk (Sakha Republic)
- Coordinates: 60°21′N 120°40′E
- Country: Russia
- Federal subject: Sakha Republic
- Administrative district: Olyokminsky District
- Rural okrugSelsoviet: Troitsky Rural Okrug

Population (2010 Census)
  - Total: 353
  - Estimate (2021): 216 (−38.8%)

Administrative status
  - Capital of: Troitsky Rural Okrug

Municipal status
  - Municipal district: Olyokminsky Municipal District
  - Rural settlement: Troitsky Rural Settlement
  - Capital of: Troitsky Rural Settlement
- Time zone: UTC+
- Postal code: 678115
- OKTMO ID: 98641470101

Troitsk (Russian: Троицк) is a rural locality (a selo), the only inhabited locality, and the administrative center of Troitsky Rural Okrug of Olyokminsky District in the Sakha Republic, Russia, located 18 kilometers (11 mi) from Olyokminsk, the administrative center of the district. Its population as of the 2010 Census was 353, of whom 187 were male and 166 female, down from 388 as recorded during the 2002 Census.
