= Tyubya =

Tyubya Тюбя
- Selo
- Interactive map of Tyubya
- Location of Tyubya Tyubya (Sakha Republic)
- Coordinates: 60°27′N 120°21′E
- Country: Russia
- Federal subject: Sakha Republic
- Administrative district: Olyokminsky District
- Rural okrugSelsoviet: Malzhagarsky Rural Okrug

Population
  - Estimate (2002): 52 )

Municipal status
  - Municipal district: Olyokminsky Municipal District
  - Rural settlement: Malzhagarsky Rural Settlement
- Time zone: UTC+
- Postal code: 678116
- OKTMO ID: 98641435111

Tyubya (Russian: Тюбя) is a rural locality (a selo) in Malzhagarsky Rural Okrug of Olyokminsky District in the Sakha Republic, Russia, located 15 kilometers (9.3 mi) from Olyokminsk, the administrative center of the district and 8 kilometers (5.0 mi) from Yunkyur, the administrative center of the rural okrug. Its population as of the 2002 Census was 52.
