= Solyanka, Sakha Republic =

Solyanka Солянка
- Selo
- Interactive map of Solyanka
- Location of Solyanka Solyanka (Sakha Republic)
- Coordinates: 60°29′N 120°43′E
- Country: Russia
- Federal subject: Sakha Republic
- Administrative district: Olyokminsky District
- Rural okrugSelsoviet: Solyansky Rural Okrug

Population
  - Estimate (2002): 498 )

Administrative status
  - Capital of: Solyansky Rural Okrug

Municipal status
  - Municipal district: Olyokminsky Municipal District
  - Rural settlement: Solyansky Rural Settlement
  - Capital of: Solyansky Rural Settlement
- Time zone: UTC+
- Postal code: 678107
- OKTMO ID: 98641465101

Solyanka (Russian: Солянка) is a rural locality (a selo) and the administrative center of Solyansky Rural Okrug in Olyokminsky District of the Sakha Republic, Russia, located 26 kilometers (16 mi) from Olyokminsk, the administrative center of the district. Its population as of the 2002 Census was 498.
