= Kyllakh =

Kyllakh Кыллах
- Selo
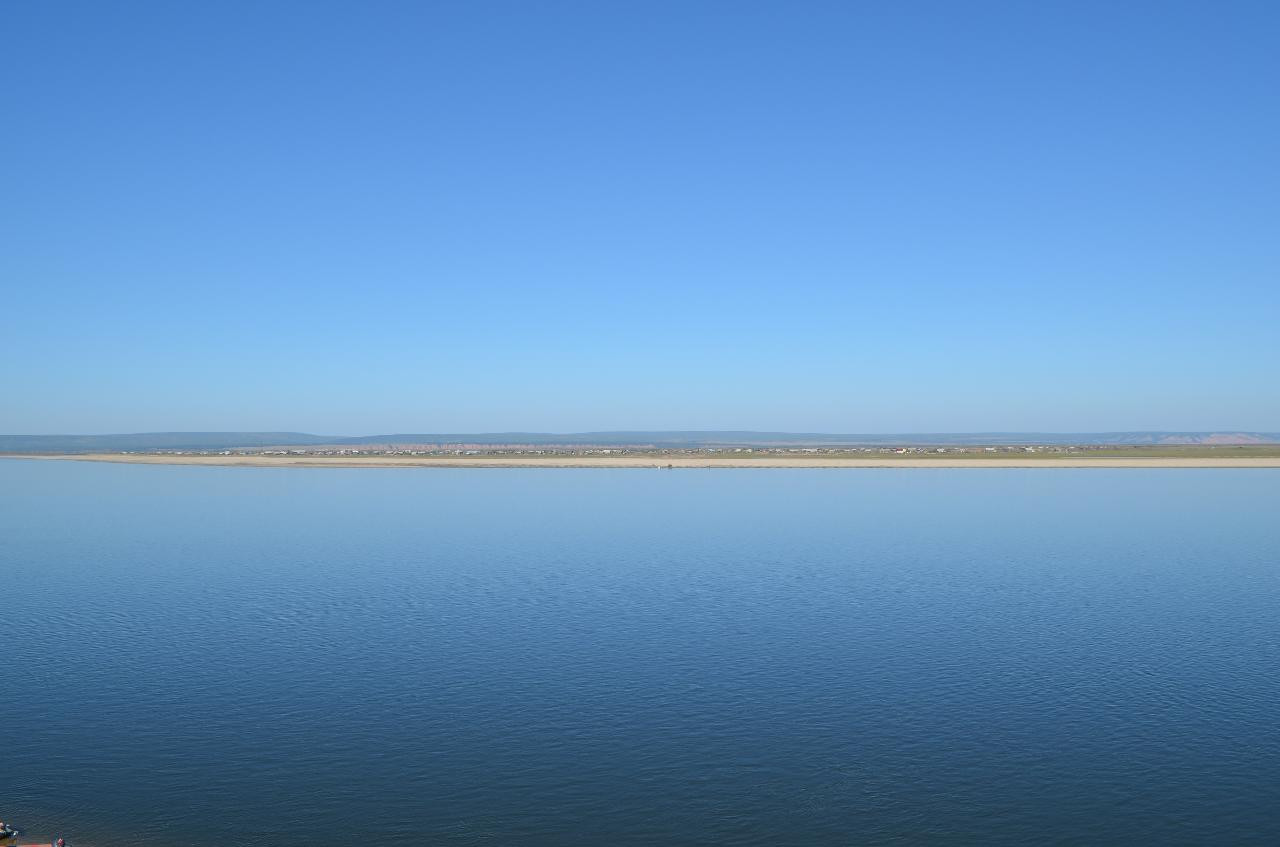
- Distant view of Kyllakh from the Lena River
- Interactive map of Kyllakh
- Location of Kyllakh Kyllakh (Sakha Republic)
- Coordinates: 60°11′N 119°59′E
- Country: Russia
- Federal subject: Sakha Republic
- Administrative district: Olyokminsky District
- Rural okrugSelsoviet: Kyllakhsky Rural Okrug
- Elevation: 137 m (449 ft)

Population
  - Estimate (2002): 960 )

Administrative status
  - Capital of: Kyllakhsky Rural Okrug

Municipal status
  - Municipal district: Olyokminsky Municipal District
  - Rural settlement: Kyllakhsky Rural Settlement
  - Capital of: Kyllakhsky Rural Settlement
- Time zone: UTC+
- Postal code: 678117
- OKTMO ID: 98641430101

Kyllakh (Russian: Кыллах; Yakut: Кыыллаах, Kııllaax) is a rural locality (selo), the administrative centre of and one of two settlements, in addition to Dapparay, in Kyllakhsky Rural Okrug of Olyokminsky District in the Sakha Republic, Russia. It is located 45 kilometers (28 mi) from Olyokminsk, the administrative center of the district. Its population as of the 2002 Census was 960.
