= Zharkhan, Olyokminsky District, Sakha Republic =

Zharkhan Жархан
- Selo
- Location of Zharkhan
- Location of Zharkhan Zharkhan (Sakha Republic)
- Coordinates: 59°59′N 119°48′E
- Country: Russia
- Federal subject: Sakha Republic
- Administrative district: Olyokminsky District
- Rural okrug: Zharkhansky Rural Okrug

Population (2010 Census)
  - Total: 2

Municipal status
  - Municipal district: Olyokminsky Municipal District
  - Rural settlement: Zharkhansky Rural Settlement
- Time zone: UTC+9 (MSK+6)
- Postal code(s): 678110
- OKTMO ID: 98641420106

Zharkhan (Russian: Жархан; Yakut: Дьаархан, Caarxan) is a rural locality (a selo) in Zharkhansky Rural Okrug of Olyokminsky District in the Sakha Republic, Russia, located 95 kilometers (59 mi) from Olyokminsk, the administrative center of the district, and 5 kilometers (3.1 mi) from Tokko, the administrative center of the rural okrug. Its population as of the 2010 Census was 2, down from 15 recorded during the 2002 Census.
