= Tokko, Russia =

Tokko Токко
- Selo
- Interactive map of Tokko
- Location of Tokko Tokko (Sakha Republic)
- Coordinates: 59°58′N 119°50′E
- Country: Russia
- Federal subject: Sakha Republic
- Administrative district: Olyokminsky District
- Rural okrugSelsoviet: Zharkhansky National Rural Okrug

Population
  - Estimate (2002): 978 )

Administrative status
  - Capital of: Zharkhansky National Rural Okrug

Municipal status
  - Municipal district: Olyokminsky Municipal District
  - Rural settlement: Zharkhansky National Rural Settlement
  - Capital of: Zharkhansky National Rural Settlement
- Time zone: UTC+
- Postal code: 678110
- OKTMO ID: 98641420101

Tokko (Russian: Токко; Yakut: Токко) is a rural locality (a selo), the administrative centre of and one of three settlements, in addition to Zharkhan and Uolbut, in Zharkhansky National Rural Okrug of Olyokminsky District in the Sakha Republic, Russia. Its population as of the 2002 Census was 978.

== Geography ==
The settlement is located by the Tokko river, 90 kilometers (56 mi) from Olyokminsk, the administrative center of the district.
