= Byas-Kyuyol, Olyokminsky District, Sakha Republic =

Byas-Kyuyol Бясь-Кюёль
- Selo
- Interactive map of Byas-Kyuyol
- Location of Byas-Kyuyol Byas-Kyuyol (Sakha Republic)
- Coordinates: 59°29′N 119°20′E
- Country: Russia
- Federal subject: Sakha Republic
- Administrative district: Olyokminsky District
- Rural okrugSelsoviet: Charinsky National Rural Okrug

Population (2010 Census)
  - Total: 215
  - Estimate (2021): 196 (−8.8%)

Administrative status
  - Capital of: Charinsky National Rural Okrug

Municipal status
  - Municipal district: Olyokminsky Municipal District
  - Rural settlement: Charinsky National Rural Settlement
  - Capital of: Charinsky National Rural Settlement
- Time zone: UTC+
- Postal code: 678111
- OKTMO ID: 98641490101

Byas-Kyuyol (Russian: Бясь-Кюёль; Yakut: Бэс Күөл, Bes Küöl) is a rural locality (a selo), the only inhabited locality, and the administrative center of Charinsky National Rural Okrug of Olyokminsky District in the Sakha Republic, Russia, located 190 kilometers (120 mi) from Olyokminsk, the administrative center of the district. Its population as of the 2010 Census was 215, of whom 109 were male and 106 female, down from 266 as recorded during the 2002 Census.
