= Dapparay =

Dapparay Даппарай
- Selo
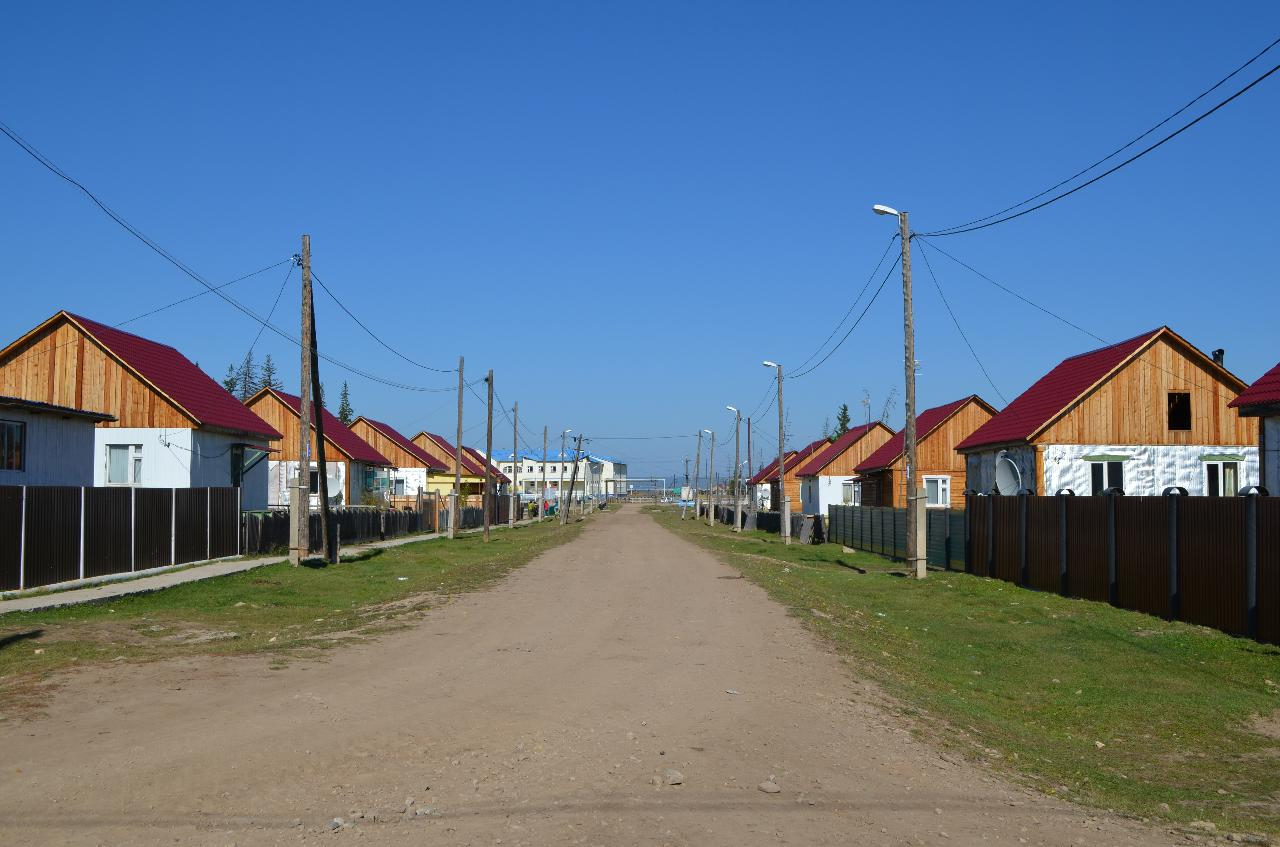
- Street view, Dapparay
- Interactive map of Dapparay
- Location of Dapparay Dapparay (Sakha Republic)
- Coordinates: 60°12′N 119°54′E
- Country: Russia
- Federal subject: Sakha Republic
- Administrative district: Olyokminsky District
- Rural KyllakhskySelsoviet: Dabansky Rural Okrug

Population
  - Estimate (2002): 85 )

Municipal status
  - Municipal district: Olyokminsky Municipal District
  - Rural settlement: Kyllakhsky Rural Settlement
- Time zone: UTC+
- Postal code: 678117
- OKTMO ID: 98641430106

Dapparay (Russian: Даппарай; Yakut: Даппарай) is a rural locality (a selo), one of two settlements, in addition to Kyllakh, in Kyllakhsky Rural Okrug of Olyokminsky District in the Sakha Republic, Russia. It is located 48 kilometers (30 mi) from Olyokminsk, the administrative center of the district and 3 kilometers (1.9 mi) from Kyllakh. Its population as of the 2002 Census was 85.
