= Balagannakh, Olyokminsky District, Sakha Republic =

Balagannakh Балаганнах
- Selo
- Interactive map of Balagannakh
- Location of Balagannakh Balagannakh (Sakha Republic)
- Coordinates: 60°39′N 121°11′E
- Country: Russia
- Federal subject: Sakha Republic
- Administrative district: Olyokminsky District Khorinsky
- Rural okrugSelsoviet

Population
  - Estimate (2002): 76 )

Municipal status
  - Municipal district: Olyokminsky Municipal District
  - Rural settlement: Khorinsky Rural Settlement
- Time zone: UTC+
- Postal code: 678131
- OKTMO ID: 98641485106

Balagannakh (Russian: Балаганнах; Yakut: Балаҕаннаах, Balağannaax) is a rural locality (a selo), one of three settlements, in addition to Khorintsy and Mekimdya, in Khorinsky Rural Okrug of Olyokminsky District in the Sakha Republic, Russia. It is located 68 kilometers (42 mi) from Olyokminsk, the administrative center of the district and 8 kilometers (5.0 mi) from Khorintsy. Its population as of the 2002 Census was 76.

== Geography ==
The town is located on the left bank of the Lena River near the mouth of the Namana, originating in the Lena Plateau.
