= Namana =

River in Yakutia, Russia

Namana Намана
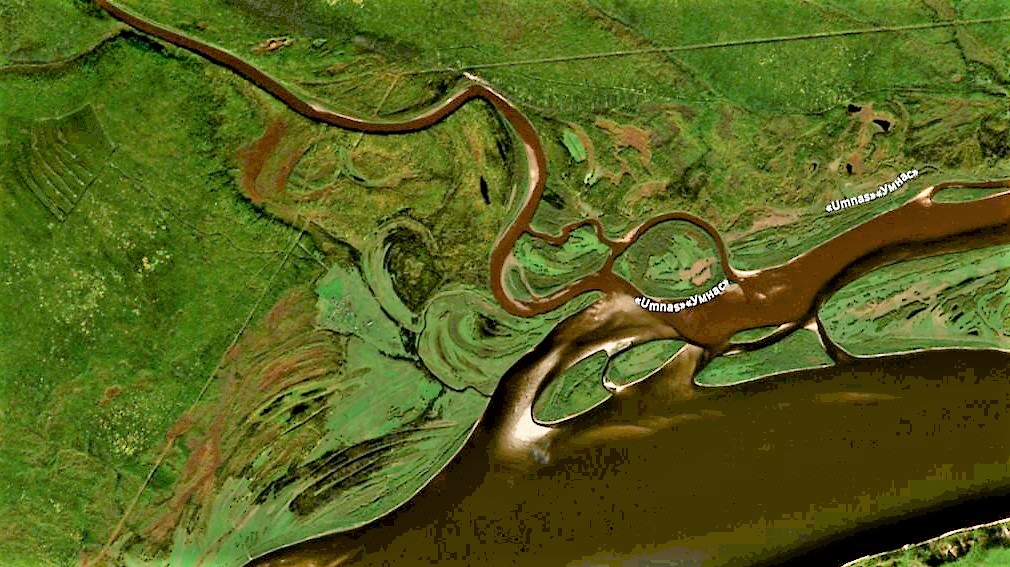
- Confluence of the Namana and the Lena Sentinel-2 image

- Mouth location in Yakutia, Russia

Location
- Country: Russia

Physical characteristics
- Source
  - location: Lena Plateau
  - coordinates: 62°20′05″N 120°20′58″E
  - elevation: 252 m (827 ft)
- Mouth: Lena
  - location: Balagannakh
  - coordinates: 60°39′08″N 121°13′29″E
  - elevation: 121 m (397 ft)
- Length: 444 km (276 mi)
- Basin size: 16,900 km^{2} (6,500 sq mi)
- Discharge
  - average: 28.6 m^{3}/s (1,010 cu ft/s)

Basin features
- Progression: Lena→ Laptev Sea

The Namana (Russian: Намана; Yakut: Намана) is a river in Yakutia (Sakha Republic), Russia. It is the 17th longest tributary of the Lena with a length of 444 kilometres (276 mi). Its drainage basin area is 16,900 square kilometres (6,500 mi^{2}).

There are no settlements located by the river, but there is industrial production of table salt in the basin. Balagannakh village is located near the mouth of the Namana in the Lena. The river flows near a landfill where there have been leaks leading to oil pollution of its waters.

== Course ==
The Namanа is a left tributary of the Lena flowing through uninhabited territory. It is formed at the confluence of the Usttaakh and Orguy rivers in the Lena Plateau. It heads across the plateau through a narrow valley, meandering increasingly. After descending into the floodplain it flows in a roughly southern direction within a wide basin dotted with lakes. Finally it meets the left bank of the Lena 2,044 kilometres (1,270 mi) from its mouth, 50 kilometres (31 mi) northeast of the city of Olyokminsk. The river basin is fed by rain and snow. Floods are common in the summer period.

=== Tributaries ===
The largest tributaries of the Namana are the 52 km (32 mi) long Dyeberelekh, the 84 km (52 mi) long Sarsan and the 60 km (37 mi) long Yulegir from the right; and the 65 km (40 mi) long Yoksyondyo, the 72 km (45 mi) long Bas-Yurekh, the 73 km (45 mi) long Ulakhan-Arbay, the 276 km (171 mi) long Keyikte (Кэйиктэ), the 54 km (34 mi) long Kuchchuguy-Nygydyakh, the 64 km (40 mi) long Mukhta and the 65 km (40 mi) long Dielimde (Anabyl) from the left. The river freezes between the end of October and May.

== Flora ==
The vegetation of the Namana basin is mainly larch taiga, mostly not dense. The snow cover in the river basin lasts between November and April.

== See also ==
- List of rivers of Russia
