= Khorintsy =

Khorintsy Хоринцы
- Selo
- Interactive map of Khorintsy
- Location of Khorintsy Khorintsy (Sakha Republic)
- Coordinates: 60°39′N 121°26′E
- Country: Russia
- Federal subject: Sakha Republic
- Administrative district: Olyokminsky District
- Rural okrugSelsoviet: Khorinsky Rural Okrug
- Elevation: 138 m (453 ft)

Population
  - Estimate (2002): 702 )

Administrative status
  - Capital of: Khorinsky Rural Okrug

Municipal status
  - Municipal district: Olyokminsky Municipal District
  - Rural settlement: Khorinsky Rural Settlement
  - Capital of: Khorinsky Rural Settlement
- Time zone: UTC+
- Postal code: 678131
- OKTMO ID: 98641485101

Khorintsy (Russian: Хоринцы; Yakut: Хоро, Xoro) is a rural locality (a selo), the administrative centre of and one of three settlements, in addition to Balagannakh and Mekimdya, in Khorinsky Rural Okrug of Olyokminsky District in the Sakha Republic, Russia. It is located 75 kilometers (47 mi) from Olyokminsk, the administrative center of the district. Its population as of the 2002 Census was 702.
