= Mekimdya =

Mekimdya Мекимдя
- Selo
- Interactive map of Mekimdya
- Location of Mekimdya Mekimdya (Sakha Republic)
- Coordinates: 60°45′N 121°09′E
- Country: Russia
- Federal subject: Sakha Republic
- Administrative district: Olyokminsky District
- Rural okrugSelsoviet: Khorinsky Rural Okrug

Population
  - Estimate (2002): 8 )

Municipal status
  - Municipal district: Olyokminsky Municipal District
  - Rural settlement: Khorinsky Rural Settlement
- Time zone: UTC+
- Postal code: 678131
- OKTMO ID: 98641485111

Mekimdya (Russian: Мекимдя) is a rural locality (a selo), one of three settlements, in addition to Khorintsy and Balagannakh, in Solyansky Rural Okrug of Olyokminsky District in the Sakha Republic, Russia. It is located 80 kilometers (50 mi) from Olyokminsk, the administrative center of the district and 36 kilometers (22 mi) from Khorintsy. Its population as of the 2002 Census was 0.
