= Zarechny, Sakha Republic =

Zarechny Заречный
- Selo

Other transcription(s)
  - Yakut: Заречнай
- Interactive map of Zarechny
- Location of Zarechny Zarechny (Sakha Republic)
- Coordinates: 60°20′N 120°27′E
- Country: Russia
- Federal subject: Sakha Republic
- Administrative district: Olyokminsky District
- Rural okrugSelsoviet: Zarechny Village
- Founded: 1991

Population (2010 Census)
  - Total: 620
  - Estimate (2021): 553 (−10.8%)

Administrative status
  - Capital of: Zarechny Village

Municipal status
  - Municipal district: Olyokminsky Municipal District
  - Rural settlement: Zarechny Village
  - Capital of: Zarechny Village
- Time zone: UTC+
- Postal code: 678100
- OKTMO ID: 98641493101

Zarechny (Russian: Заречный) is a rural locality (a selo), the only inhabited locality, and the administrative center of Zarechny Village of Olyokminsky District in the Sakha Republic, Russia, located 3 kilometers (1.9 mi) from Olyokminsk, the administrative center of the district. Its population as of the 2010 Census was 620, of whom 327 were male and 293 female, down from 674 as recorded during the 2002 Census.
