= Djarkhan =

Former village in Sakha Republic, Russia

Djarkhan is a former village located in southwestern Sakha Republic, Russia. (Note: "This book offers an intimate glimpse of life in an isolated corner of the southwestern Sakha Republic, describing the farming village of Djarkhan both as it exists today and from a cogent historical perspective, tracing nearly five centuries of ...") In 1957, it was merged into Kyundyade.

== See also ==
- List of rural localities in the Sakha Republic
