= Keyikte =

River in Yakutia, Russia

Keyikte Кэйиктэ
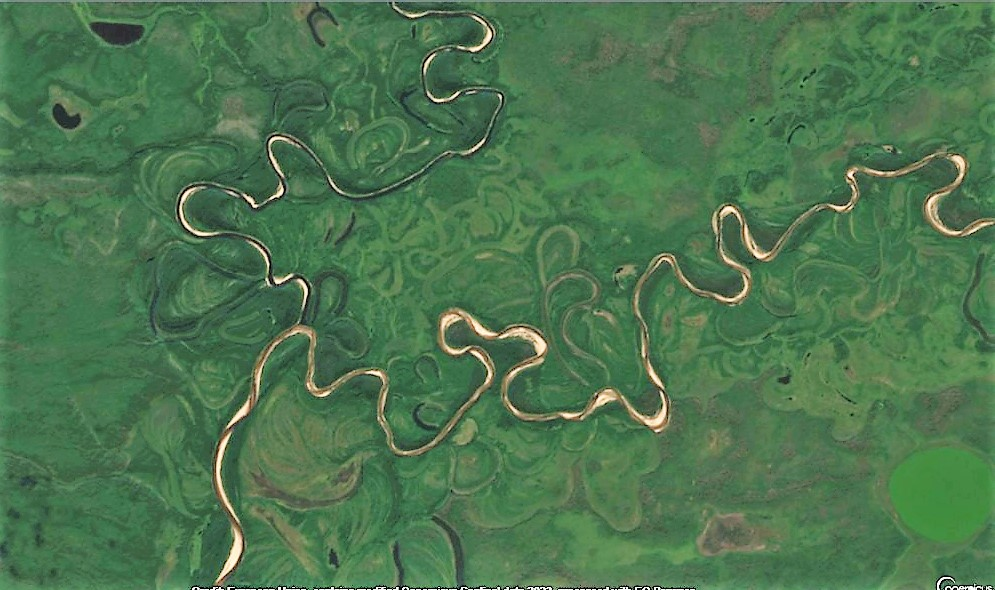
- Confluence of the Keyikte and the Namana Sentinel-2 image.

- Mouth location in Yakutia, Russia

Location
- Country: Russia

Physical characteristics
- Source
  - location: Lena Plateau
  - coordinates: 62°14′40″N 121°21′04″E
- Mouth: Namana
  - coordinates: 61°36′34″N 120°18′34″E
- Length: 276 km (171 mi)
- Basin size: 3,650 km^{2} (1,410 sq mi)

Basin features
- Progression: Namana → Lena→ Laptev Sea

The Keyikte (Russian: Кэйиктэ; Yakut: Кэйиктэ) is a river in Yakutia (Sakha Republic), Russia. It is the longest tributary of the Namana, of the Lena basin. Its length is 276 kilometres (171 mi) and its drainage basin area 3,650 square kilometres (1,410 mi^{2}).

The river has its sources in Verkhnevilyuysky District and its lower course is in Olyokminsky District. Part of the upper course of the river falls within a protected area.

== Course ==
The Keyikte is a left tributary of the Namana flowing through uninhabited territory. It is formed in the Lena Plateau. It heads first roughly southwards, then almost halfway through its course, its bends westwards across the plateau meandering strongly within a floodplain dotted with lakes. There are over 300 lakes in its basin. Finally it meets the left bank of the Namana in its middle course, 231 kilometres (144 mi) from its mouth in the Lena.

The Keyikte freezes between the mid October and early May. Its basin is fed by rain and snow. Its main tributaries are the 39 km (24 mi) long Tisik (Тисик) and the 45 km (28 mi) long Maran (Маран) on the left.

== See also ==
- List of rivers of Russia
