= Cherendey =

Cherendey Черендей
- Selo
- Interactive map of Cherendey
- Location of Cherendey Cherendey (Sakha Republic)
- Coordinates: 60°13′N 119°22′E
- Country: Russia
- Federal subject: Sakha Republic
- Administrative district: Olyokminsky District
- Rural okrugSelsoviet: Dabansky Rural Okrug

Population
  - Estimate (2002): 0 )

Municipal status
  - Municipal district: Olyokminsky Municipal District
  - Rural settlement: Dabansky Rural Settlement
- Time zone: UTC+
- Postal code: 678120
- OKTMO ID: 98641410111

Cherendey (Russian: Черендей; Yakut: Чэрэндэй, Çerendey) is a rural locality (a selo), one of three settlements, in addition to Daban and Kochegarovo, in Dabansky Rural Okrug of Olyokminsky District in the Sakha Republic, Russia. It is located 67 kilometers (42 mi) from Olyokminsk, the administrative center of the district and 31 kilometers (19 mi) from Daban. Its population as of the 2002 Census was 0.
