= Chapayevo, Olyokminsky District, Sakha Republic =

Chapayevo Чапаево
- Selo
- Interactive map of Chapayevo
- Location of Chapayevo Chapayevo (Sakha Republic)
- Coordinates: 60°07′N 117°07′E
- Country: Russia
- Federal subject: Sakha Republic
- Administrative district: Olyokminsky District
- Rural okrugSelsoviet: Chapayevsky Rural Okrug

Population (2010 Census)
  - Total: 886
  - Estimate (2021): 670 (−24.4%)

Administrative status
  - Capital of: Chapayevsky Rural Okrug

Municipal status
  - Municipal district: Olyokminsky Municipal District
  - Rural settlement: Chapayevsky Rural Settlement
  - Capital of: Chapayevsky Rural Settlement
- Time zone: UTC+
- Postal code: 678124
- OKTMO ID: 98641487101

Chapayevo (Russian: Чапаево) is a rural locality (a selo) and the administrative center of Chapayevsky Rural Okrug in Olyokminsky District of the Sakha Republic, Russia, located 243 kilometers (151 mi) from Olyokminsk, the administrative center of the district. Its population as of the 2010 Census was 886; up from 859 recorded in the 2002 Census.
