= Kudu-Byas =

Kudu-Byas Куду-Бясь
- Selo
- Interactive map of Kudu-Byas
- Location of Kudu-Byas Kudu-Byas (Sakha Republic)
- Coordinates: 60°14′N 119°39′E
- Country: Russia
- Federal subject: Sakha Republic
- Administrative district: Olyokminsky District
- Rural okrugSelsoviet: Neryuktyayinsky 1-y Rural Okrug

Population (2010 Census)
  - Total: 2
  - Estimate (2021): 1 (−50%)

Municipal status
  - Municipal district: Olyokminsky Municipal District
  - Rural settlement: Neryuktyayinsky 1-y Rural Settlement
- Time zone: UTC+
- Postal code: 678106
- OKTMO ID: 98641445111

Kudu-Byas (Russian: Куду-Бясь; Yakut: Куду Бэс, Kudu Bes) is a rural locality (a selo) in Neryuktyayinsky 1-y Rural Okrug of Olyokminsky District in the Sakha Republic, Russia, located 44 kilometers (27 mi) from Olyokminsk, the administrative center of the district, and 6 kilometers (3.7 mi) from Neryuktyayinsk 1-y, the administrative center of the rural okrug. Its population as of the 2010 Census was 2, down from 5 recorded during the 2002 Census.
