= Kyulyunken =

Rural locality in Sakha Republic, Russia

Coordinates: 64°09′N 136°03′E

Kyulyunken is a rural locality in Tomponsky Ulus of the Sakha Republic, Russia.
