= Abaga Falls =

Coordinates: 8°9′8″N 124°13′6″E

Abaga Falls is a waterfall and ecosystem located approximately 15 km southwest of Iligan City on the island of Mindanao, Philippines, specifically in barangay Abaga, Balo-i, Lanao del Norte. The height of Abaga Falls is approximately twice that of the more famous Maria Cristina Falls also located within the proximity of Iligan City (in barangay Maria Cristina, Balo-i municipality). Unlike Maria Cristina Falls, however, which is fed by the Agus river, the water source of Abaga Falls are several underground springs which flow into the top of Abaga Falls via several tributaries.

Also unlike the more popular Maria Cristina Falls, human access to Abaga Falls is severely limited due to a current lack of regularly maintained roads as well as the fact that a moderate amount of walking is required to reach the base of the falls. This level of isolation has not protected the ecosystem from damage due to deforestation and over-hunting.

The name may have been derived from the Cebuano term "abaga" which means "shoulder", possibly relating to the shape and height of the cliff.

== Flora and fauna ==
There are a number of interesting animals that inhabit the area in and around Abaga Falls. The most notable include; the endangered Philippine eagle (Pithecophaga jefferyi) also commonly known as the "monkey-eating eagle", the rufous hornbill (Buceros hydrocorax), the endangered giant golden-crowned flying fox (Acerodon jubatus) which can only be found in the Philippines, and the Philippine flying lemur (Cynocephalus volans). Many of these animals are either near extinction or in danger of losing their habitats due to human activities.

== Conservation efforts ==
There is currently very little being done to help preserve the Abaga Falls area from both man-made and natural distress.

The Save Abaga Falls group is a grass-roots campaign that was recently founded by a former resident of Abaga Falls now living in the United States. This group is currently in the process of obtaining as much information as possible regarding the current environmental status of the Abaga Falls ecosystem.

== See also ==
- List of waterfalls
- Suarez, Iligan City
