= Uritskoye, Sakha Republic =

Uritskoye Урицкое
- Selo
- Interactive map of Uritskoye
- Location of Uritskoye Uritskoye (Sakha Republic)
- Coordinates: 60°36′N 122°23′E
- Country: Russia
- Federal subject: Sakha Republic
- Administrative district: Olyokminsky District
- Rural okrugSelsoviet: Uritsky Rural Okrug

Population (2010 Census)
  - Total: 304
  - Estimate (2021): 246 (−19.1%)

Administrative status
  - Capital of: Uritsky Rural Okrug

Municipal status
  - Municipal district: Olyokminsky Municipal District
  - Rural settlement: Uritsky Rural Settlement
  - Capital of: Uritsky Rural Settlement
- Time zone: UTC+
- Postal code: 678132
- OKTMO ID: 98641480101

Uritskoye (Russian: Урицкое) is a rural locality (a selo) and the administrative center of Uritsky Rural Okrug in Olyokminsky District of the Sakha Republic, Russia, located 130 kilometers (81 mi) from Olyokminsk, the administrative center of the district. Its population as of the 2010 Census was 304, down from 329 recorded during the 2002 Census.
