= Tyanya =

Tyanya Тяня
- Selo
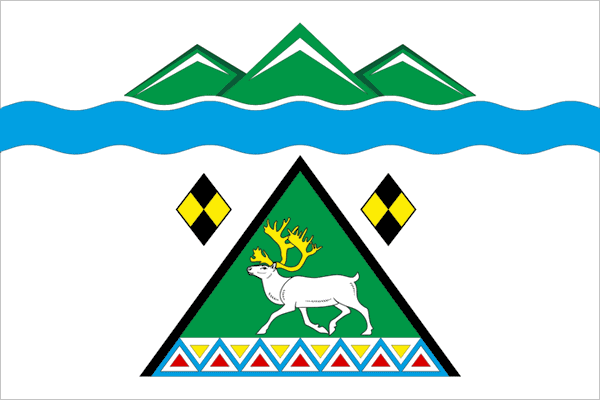
- Flag
- Interactive map of Tyanya
- Location of Tyanya Tyanya (Sakha Republic)
- Coordinates: 59°04′N 119°45′E
- Country: Russia
- Federal subject: Sakha Republic
- Administrative district: Olyokminsky District
- Rural okrugSelsoviet: Tyansky Rural Okrug

Population (2010 Census)
  - Total: 499
  - Estimate (2021): 476 (−4.6%)

Administrative status
  - Capital of: Tyansky Rural Okrug

Municipal status
  - Municipal district: Olyokminsky Municipal District
  - Rural settlement: Tyansky Rural Settlement
  - Capital of: Tyansky Rural Settlement
- Time zone: UTC+
- Postal code: 678112
- OKTMO ID: 98641475101

Tyanya (Russian: Тяня; Yakut: Тээнэ, Teene) is a rural locality (a selo) and the administrative center of Tyansky Rural Okrug in Olyokminsky District of the Sakha Republic, Russia, located 280 kilometers (170 mi) from Olyokminsk, the administrative center of the district. Its population as of the 2010 Census was 499, up from 451 recorded during the 2002 Census.
