= Tas-Anna =

Tas-Anna Тас-Анна
- Selo
- Interactive map of Tas-Anna
- Location of Tas-Anna Tas-Anna (Sakha Republic)
- Coordinates: 60°15′N 119°44′E
- Country: Russia
- Federal subject: Sakha Republic
- Administrative district: Olyokminsky District
- Rural okrugSelsoviet: Neryuktyayinsky 1-y Rural Okrug

Population
  - Estimate (2002): 201 )

Municipal status
  - Municipal district: Olyokminsky Municipal District
  - Rural settlement: Neryuktyayinsky 1-y Rural Settlement
- Time zone: UTC+
- Postal code: 678106
- OKTMO ID: 98641445116

Tas-Anna (Russian: Тас-Анна) is a rural locality (a selo) in Neryuktyayinsky 1-y Rural Okrug of Olyokminsky District in the Sakha Republic, Russia, located 47 kilometers (29 mi) from Olyokminsk, the administrative center of the district and 3 kilometers (1.9 mi) from Daban, the administrative center of the rural okrug. Its population as of the 2002 Census was 201.
