= Solyanka, Svetloyarsky District, Volgograd Oblast =

Solyanka Солянка
- Selo
- Location within Volgograd Oblast Location within Russia
- Coordinates: 48°25′N 44°25′E
- Country: Russia
- Region: Volgograd Oblast
- District: Svetloyarsky District
- Time zone: UTC+4:00

Solyanka (Russian: Солянка) is a rural locality (a selo) in Svetloyarsky District, Volgograd Oblast, Russia. The population was 238 as of 2010. There are 7 streets.

== Geography ==
Solyanka is located 32 kilometres (20 mi) southwest of Svetly Yar, the district's administrative centre, by road. Posyolok Solyanoy is the nearest rural locality.
