= Namtsyr =

Namtsyr Намцыр
- Selo
- Interactive map of Namtsyr
- Location of Namtsyr Namtsyr (Sakha Republic)
- Coordinates: 62°11′30″N 129°28′51″E
- Country: Russia
- Federal subject: Sakha Republic

Population (2010 Census)
  - Total: 3

Administrative status
  - Subordinated to: city of republic significance of Yakutsk

Municipal status
  - Municipal district: Yakutsk Urban Okrug

Namtsyr (Russian: Намцыр) is a rural locality (a selo) under the administrative jurisdiction of the city of republic significance of Yakutsk in the Sakha Republic, Russia. Its population as of the 2010 Census was 3; up from 0 recorded in the 2002 Census.
