= Solyanka, Akhtubinsky District, Astrakhan Oblast =

Solyanka Солянка
- Selo
- Location within Astrakhan Oblast Location within Russia
- Coordinates: 48°31′N 45°52′E
- Country: Russia
- Region: Astrakhan Oblast
- District: Akhtubinsky District
- Time zone: UTC+4:00

Solyanka (Russian: Солянка) is a rural locality (a selo) in Pologozaynishchensky Selsoviet of Akhtubinsky District, Astrakhan Oblast, Russia. The population was 68 as of 2010. There are three streets.

== Geography ==
Solyanka is located 37 km northwest of Akhtubinsk (the district's administrative centre) by road. Uzlovaya is the nearest rural locality.
