= Kudu-Kyuyol =

Kudu-Kyuyol Куду-Кюёль
- Selo
- Interactive map of Kudu-Kyuyol
- Location of Kudu-Kyuyol Kudu-Kyuyol (Sakha Republic)
- Coordinates: 59°26′N 121°19′E
- Country: Russia
- Federal subject: Sakha Republic
- Administrative district: Olyokminsky District
- Rural okrugSelsoviet: Kindigirsky Rural Okrug
- Founded: 1924

Population (2021 Census)
  - Total: 220
  - Estimate (2021): 220 (0%)

Administrative status
  - Capital of: Kindigirsky Rural Okrug

Municipal status
  - Municipal district: Olyokminsky Municipal District
  - Rural settlement: Kindigirsky Rural Settlement
  - Capital of: Kindigirsky Rural Settlement
- Time zone: UTC+
- Postal code: 678113
- OKTMO ID: 98641425101

Kudu-Kyuyol (Russian: Куду-Кюёль; Yakut: Куду Күөл, Kudu Küöl) is a rural locality (a selo) and the administrative center of Kindigirsky Rural Okrug of Olyokminsky District in the Sakha Republic, Russia. It is also the administrative center of Kindigirsky Rural Settlement. The village is located on the right bank of the Olekma River, approximately 180 km (110 mi) from Olyokminsk, the administrative center of the district.

== History ==
Kudu-Kyuyol was founded in 1924 on the right bank of the Olekma River.

The Evenki family community Kindigir was established in the village in 2002. It is a nomadic community whose members maintain traditional hunting and reindeer-herding practices in the surrounding taiga.

== Geography and transport ==
Kudu-Kyuyol stands on the Olekma River, which is an important transport route for the settlement. During the summer, boats are used to travel to Olyokminsk. Reports published in 2022 and 2023 put the journey at approximately five to seven hours, depending on conditions and the boat used.

In winter, the frozen river and nearby waterways form a temporary ice road known as a zimnik. The winter route to Olyokminsk is approximately 60 kilometres longer than the river route.

== Economy ==
Hunting for fur-bearing animals is one of the main traditional occupations in Kudu-Kyuyol. Fishing, reindeer herding and horse breeding are also practiced in the area.

The Kindigir community was reported to have 24 members in 2022, with traditional hunting grounds covering approximately 700,000 hectares. Its members trap fur-bearing animals, hunt for food and move seasonally through the taiga with their reindeer. Berries and wild plants are also gathered.

A 2022 report described efforts to restore the community's reindeer herd, which had fallen from around 200 animals to 26. The community planned to increase the herd and expand horse breeding. Woodworking was also being considered as another source of employment.

== Infrastructure ==
The village has a school, kindergarten, diesel power station, post office, local administration, a branch of the telecommunications company Rostelecom and a cultural club, according to reports published in 2022 and 2023.

The school and kindergarten share a building, which also houses a library. The library has an area devoted to Evenki culture and folklore, including traditional objects and educational projects about Evenki stories and crafts.

== Demographics and culture ==
The 2021 Russian Census recorded 220 residents in Kudu-Kyuyol. Earlier census figures were 317 in 2002 and 349 in 2010.

Population of Kudu-Kyuyol
Census year	Population
2002	317
2010	349
2021	220

The population is predominantly Evenki, with a smaller Yakut community. A 2022 report by YSIA estimated that Yakuts made up approximately 3–4 percent of the population.

Evenki has declined in everyday use. The same report noted that only three or four elderly residents still spoke the language, while Yakut was more commonly spoken.

The local school has organised projects to introduce children to Evenki folklore and traditional objects. These include activities based on Evenki fairy tales and traditional dolls. The school's library has also collected traditional household objects from residents, including vessels made from birch bark.

== Hydrology ==
A hydrological station named Kudu-Kyuel is located on the Olekma River. A 2022 scientific study of river basins in southern Yakutia used streamflow observations from the station covering the period from 1934 to 2019.
