= Olyokminsky (rural locality) =

Olyokminsky Олёкминский
- Selo
- Interactive map of Olyokminsky
- Location of Olyokminsky Olyokminsky (Sakha Republic)
- Coordinates: 60°23′N 120°11′E
- Country: Russia
- Federal subject: Sakha Republic
- Administrative district: Olyokminsky District
- Rural okrugSelsoviet: Olyokminsky Rural Okrug

Population (2010 Census)
  - Total: 1,027
  - Estimate (2021): 936 (−8.9%)

Administrative status
  - Capital of: Olyokminsky Rural Okrug

Municipal status
  - Municipal district: Olyokminsky Municipal District
  - Rural settlement: Olyokminsky Rural Settlement
  - Capital of: Olyokminsky Rural Settlement
- Time zone: UTC+
- Postal code: 678115
- OKTMO ID: 98641453101

Olyokminsky (Russian: Олёкминский; Yakut: Өлүөхүмэ, Ölüöxüme) is a rural locality (a selo), the only inhabited locality, and the administrative center of Olyokminsky Rural Okrug of Olyokminsky District in the Sakha Republic, Russia, located 12 kilometers (7.5 mi) from Olyokminsk, the administrative center of the district. Its population as of the 2010 Census was 1,027, up from 974 recorded during the 2002 Census.
