= Abaga tsentralnaya =

Abaga tsentralnaya Абага центральная
- Selo
- Interactive map of Abaga tsentralnaya
- Location of Abaga tsentralnaya Abaga tsentralnaya (Sakha Republic)
- Coordinates: 60°19′N 119°59′E
- Country: Russia
- Federal subject: Sakha Republic
- Administrative district: Olyokminsky District
- Rural okrugSelsoviet: Abaginsky Rural Okrug

Population
  - Estimate (2021): 307 )

Municipal status
  - Municipal district: Olyokminsky Municipal District
  - Rural settlement: Abaginsky Rural Settlement
- Time zone: UTC+
- Postal code: 678109
- OKTMO ID: 98641405106

Abaga tsentralnaya (Russian: Абага центральная; Yakut: Киин Абаҕа, Kiin Abağa) is a rural locality (a selo) in Abaginsky Rural Okrug of Olyokminsky District in the Sakha Republic, Russia, located 34 kilometers (21 mi) from Olyokminsk, the administrative center of the district and 4 kilometers (2.5 mi) from Abaga, the administrative center of the rural okrug. Its population as of the 2002 Census was 581.
