= Delgey =

Delgey Дельгей
- Selo
- Interactive map of Delgey
- Location of Delgey Delgey (Sakha Republic)
- Coordinates: 59°54′N 118°36′E
- Country: Russia
- Federal subject: Sakha Republic
- Administrative district: Olyokminsky District
- Rural okrugSelsoviet: Delgeysky Rural Okrug
- Elevation: 155 m (509 ft)

Population (2010 Census)
  - Total: 466
  - Estimate (2021): 254 (−45.5%)

Administrative status
  - Capital of: Delgeysky Rural Okrug

Municipal status
  - Municipal district: Olyokminsky Municipal District
  - Rural settlement: Delgeysky Rural Settlement
  - Capital of: Delgeysky Rural Settlement
- Time zone: UTC+9 (MSK+6)
- Postal code: 678126
- OKTMO ID: 98641415101

Delgey (Russian: Дельгей) is a rural locality (a selo) and the administrative center of Delgeysky Rural Okrug in Olyokminsky District of the Sakha Republic, Russia, located 125 kilometers (78 mi) from Olyokminsk, the administrative center of the district. Its population as of the 2010 Census was 466; down from 554 recorded in the 2002 Census.
