= Tabaga, Yakutsk, Sakha Republic =

Rural locality in the Sakha Republic, Russia

Tabaga Табага Табаҕа (Yakut)
- Selo
- Interactive map of Tabaga
- Location of Tabaga Tabaga (Sakha Republic)
- Coordinates: 61°51′32″N 129°35′46″E
- Country: Russia
- Federal subject: Sakha Republic
- Founded: 1958
- Elevation: 95 m (312 ft)

Population (2010 Census)
  - Total: 3,360
  - Estimate (2021): 2,006 (−40.3%)

Administrative status
  - Subordinated to: city of republic significance of Yakutsk

Municipal status
  - Municipal district: Yakutsk Urban Okrug
- Time zone: UTC+9 (MSK+6)
- Postal code: 677911
- OKTMO ID: 98701000116

Tabaga (Russian: Табага; Yakut: Табаҕа, Tabağa) is a rural locality (a selo) under the administrative jurisdiction of the city of republic significance of Yakutsk in the Sakha Republic, Russia. Its population as of the 2010 Census was 3360; down from 3746 recorded in the 2002 Census.
