= Markha, Olyokminsky District =

Markha Марха
- Selo
- Interactive map of Markha
- Location of Markha Markha (Sakha Republic)
- Coordinates: 60°36′N 123°17′E
- Country: Russia
- Federal subject: Sakha Republic
- Administrative district: Olyokminsky District
- Rural okrugSelsoviet: Sanyyakhtakhsky Rural Okrug

Population
  - Estimate (2002): 190 )

Municipal status
  - Municipal district: Olyokminsky Municipal District
  - Rural settlement: Sanyyakhtakhsky Rural Settlement
- Time zone: UTC+
- Postal code: 678133
- OKTMO ID: 98641460116

Markha (Russian: Марха; Yakut: Марха, Marxa) is a rural locality (a selo) in Sanyyakhtakhsky Rural Okrug of Olyokminsky District in the Sakha Republic, Russia, located 184 kilometers (114 mi) from Olyokminsk, the administrative center of the district and 51 kilometers (32 mi) from Sanyyakhtakh, the administrative center of the rural okrug. Its population as of the 2002 Census was 190.
