= Zaton LORPa =

Zaton LORPa Затон ЛОРПа
- Selo
- Interactive map of Zaton LORPa
- Location of Zaton LORPa Zaton LORPa (Sakha Republic)
- Coordinates: 60°23′N 120°21′E
- Country: Russia
- Federal subject: Sakha Republic
- Administrative district: Olyokminsky District
- TownSelsoviet: Olyokminsk

Population (2010 Census)
  - Total: 4
  - Estimate (2021): 1 (−75%)

Municipal status
  - Municipal district: Olyokminsky Municipal District
  - Urban settlement: Olyokminsk Urban Settlement
- Time zone: UTC+
- Postal code: 678100
- OKTMO ID: 98641101111

Zaton LORPa (Russian: Затон ЛОРПа) is a rural locality (a selo) situated within the administrative jurisdiction of the Town of Olyokminsk in Olyokminsky District of the Sakha Republic, Russia, located 3 kilometers (1.9 mi) away from Olyokminsk. Its population as of the 2010 Census was 4; down from 12 recorded in the 2002 Census.
