= Yunkyur, Olyokminsky District, Sakha Republic =

Yunkyur Юнкюр
- Selo

Other transcription(s)
  - Yakut: Үҥкүр
- Interactive map of Yunkyur
- Location of Yunkyur Yunkyur (Sakha Republic)
- Coordinates: 60°24′N 120°18′E
- Country: Russia
- Federal subject: Sakha Republic
- Administrative district: Olyokminsky District
- Rural okrugSelsoviet: Malzhagarsky Rural Okrug
- Elevation: 186 m (610 ft)

Population (2010 Census)
  - Total: 1,046
  - Estimate (2021): 1,032 (−1.3%)

Administrative status
  - Capital of: Malzhagarsky Rural Okrug

Municipal status
  - Municipal district: Olyokminsky Municipal District
  - Rural settlement: Malzhagarsky Rural Settlement
  - Capital of: Malzhagarsky Rural Settlement
- Time zone: UTC+
- Postal code: 678116
- OKTMO ID: 98641435101

Yunkyur (Russian: Юнкюр; Yakut: Үҥкүр, Üŋkür) is a rural locality (a selo) and the administrative center of Malzhagarsky Rural Okrug in Olyokminsky District of the Sakha Republic, Russia, located 7 kilometers (4.3 mi) from Olyokminsk, the administrative center of the district. Its population as of the 2010 Census was 1,046, down from 1,092 recorded in the 2002 Census.
