= Neryuktyayinsk 2-y =

Neryuktyayinsk 2-y Нерюктяйинск 2-й
- Selo
- Interactive map of Neryuktyayinsk 2-y
- Location of Neryuktyayinsk 2-y Neryuktyayinsk 2-y (Sakha Republic)
- Coordinates: 60°15′N 119°54′E
- Country: Russia
- Federal subject: Sakha Republic
- Administrative district: Olyokminsky District
- Rural okrugSelsoviet: Neryuktyayinsky 2-y Rural Okrug

Population (2010 Census)
  - Total: 832
  - Estimate (2021): 657 (−21%)

Administrative status
  - Capital of: Neryuktyayinsky 2-y Rural Okrug

Municipal status
  - Municipal district: Olyokminsky Municipal District
  - Rural settlement: Neryuktyayinsky 2-y Rural Settlement
  - Capital of: Neryuktyayinsky 2-y Rural Settlement
- Time zone: UTC+
- Postal code: 678105
- OKTMO ID: 98641450101

Neryuktyayinsk 2-y (Russian: Нерюктяйинск 2-й) is a rural locality (a selo) and the administrative center of Neryuktyayinsky 2-y Rural Okrug of Olyokminsky District in the Sakha Republic, Russia, located 37 kilometers (23 mi) from Olyokminsk, the administrative center of the district. Its population as of the 2010 Census was 832; up from 817 recorded in the 2002 Census.
