= Kyundyade =

Kyundyade Кюндяде
- Selo

Other transcription(s)
  - Yakut: Күндээдэ
- Interactive map of Kyundyade
- Location of Kyundyade Kyundyade (Sakha Republic)
- Coordinates: 63°12′55″N 118°08′39″E
- Country: Russia
- Federal subject: Sakha Republic
- Administrative district: Nyurbinsky District
- Rural okrugSelsoviet: Kyundyadinsky Rural Okrug
- Founded: 1957

Population
  - Estimate (2002): 985 )

Administrative status
  - Capital of: Kyundyadinsky Rural Okrug

Municipal status
  - Municipal district: Nyurbinsky Municipal District
  - Rural settlement: Kyundyadinsky Rural Settlement
  - Capital of: Kyundyadinsky Rural Settlement
- Time zone: UTC+
- Postal code: 678471
- OKTMO ID: 98626425101

Kyundyade (Russian: Кюндяде; Yakut: Күндээдэ, romanized: Kündeede) is a rural locality (a selo) and the administrative center of Kyundyadinsky Rural Okrug of Nyurbinsky District in the Sakha Republic, Russia, located 15 kilometers (9.3 mi) from Nyurba, the administrative center of the district. Its population as of the 2002 Census was 985.

== See also ==
- Djarkhan
