= Abaga, Olyokminsky District, Sakha Republic =

Abaga Абага
- Selo
- Interactive map of Abaga
- Location of Abaga Abaga (Sakha Republic)
- Coordinates: 60°19′N 120°02′E
- Country: Russia
- Federal subject: Sakha Republic
- Administrative district: Olyokminsky District
- Rural okrugSelsoviet: Abaginsky Rural Okrug
- Elevation: 136 m (446 ft)

Population
  - Estimate (2021): 553 )

Administrative status
  - Capital of: Abaginsky Rural Okrug

Municipal status
  - Municipal district: Olyokminsky Municipal District
  - Rural settlement: Abaginsky Rural Settlement
  - Capital of: Abaginsky Rural Settlement
- Time zone: UTC+
- Postal code: 678109
- OKTMO ID: 98641405101

Abaga (Russian: Абага; Yakut: Абаҕа, Abağa) is a rural locality (a selo) and the administrative center of Abaginsky Rural Okrug of Olyokminsky District in the Sakha Republic, Russia, located 30 kilometers (19 mi) from Olyokminsk, the administrative center of the district. Its population as of the 2002 Census was 577.
