= Abaga, Amginsky District, Sakha Republic =

Abaga Абага
- Selo
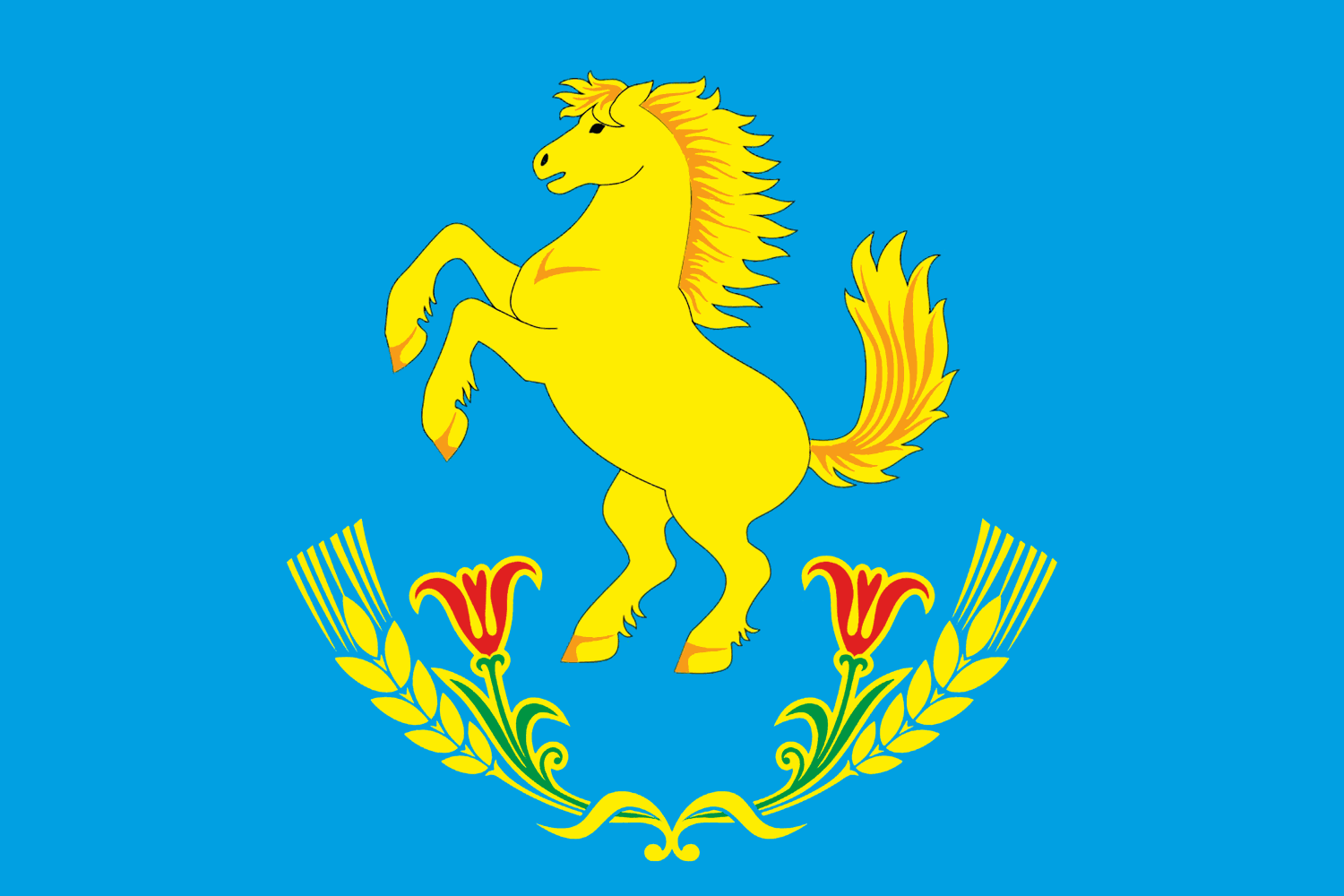
- Flag
- Interactive map of Abaga
- Location of Abaga Abaga (Sakha Republic)
- Coordinates: 61°03′N 132°17′E
- Country: Russia
- Federal subject: Sakha Republic
- Administrative district: Amginsky District
- Rural okrugSelsoviet: Abaginsky Rural Okrug
- Elevation: 337 m (1,106 ft)

Population (2010 Census)
  - Total: 1,192
  - Estimate (January 2016): 1,117 (−6.3%)

Administrative status
  - Capital of: Abaginsky Rural Okrug

Municipal status
  - Municipal district: Amginsky Municipal District
  - Rural settlement: Abaginsky Rural Settlement
  - Capital of: Abaginsky Rural Settlement
- Time zone: UTC+
- Postal code: 678604
- OKTMO ID: 98608405101

Abaga (Russian: Абага; Yakut: Абаҕа, Abağa) is a rural locality (a selo), the only inhabited locality, and the administrative center of Abaginsky Rural Okrug in Amginsky District of the Sakha Republic, Russia, located 25 kilometers (16 mi) from Amga, the administrative center of the district. Its population as of the 2010 census was 1,192, up from 1,187 recorded during the 2002 census.
