= Kyachchi =

Kyachchi Кяччи
- Selo
- Interactive map of Kyachchi
- Location of Kyachchi Kyachchi (Sakha Republic)
- Coordinates: 60°21′N 120°05′E
- Country: Russia
- Federal subject: Sakha Republic
- Administrative district: Olyokminsky District
- Rural okrugSelsoviet: Kyachchinsky Rural Okrug

Population
  - Estimate (2002): 345 )

Administrative status
  - Capital of: Kyachchinsky Rural Okrug

Municipal status
  - Municipal district: Olyokminsky Municipal District
  - Rural settlement: Kyachchinsky Rural Settlement
  - Capital of: Kyachchinsky Rural Settlement
- Time zone: UTC+
- Postal code: 678108
- OKTMO ID: 98641434101

Kyachchi (Russian: Кяччи; Yakut: Кээччи, Keeççi) is a rural locality (a selo) and the administrative center of Kyachchinsky Rural Okrug of Olyokminsky District in the Sakha Republic, Russia, located 25 kilometers (16 mi) from Olyokminsk, the administrative center of the district. Its population as of the 2002 Census was 345.
