= Daban, Russia =

Daban Дабан
- Selo
- Interactive map of Daban
- Location of Daban Daban (Sakha Republic)
- Coordinates: 60°07′N 119°12′E
- Country: Russia
- Federal subject: Sakha Republic
- Administrative district: Olyokminsky District
- Rural okrugSelsoviet: Dabansky Rural Okrug
- Elevation: 185 m (607 ft)

Population
  - Estimate (2002): 562 )

Administrative status
  - Capital of: Dabansky Rural Okrug

Municipal status
  - Municipal district: Olyokminsky Municipal District
  - Rural settlement: Dabansky Rural Settlement
  - Capital of: Dabansky Rural Settlement
- Time zone: UTC+
- Postal code: 678120
- OKTMO ID: 98641410101

Daban (Russian: Дабан; Yakut: Дабаан, Dabaan) is a rural locality (a selo) and the administrative center of Dabansky Rural Okrug of Olyokminsky District in the Sakha Republic, Russia, located 85 kilometers (53 mi) from Olyokminsk, the administrative center of the district. Its population as of the 2002 Census was 562.
