= Sanyyakhtakh =

Sanyyakhtakh Саныяхтах
- Selo
- Interactive map of Sanyyakhtakh
- Location of Sanyyakhtakh Sanyyakhtakh (Sakha Republic)
- Coordinates: 60°36′N 124°05′E
- Country: Russia
- Federal subject: Sakha Republic
- Administrative district: Olyokminsky District
- Rural okrugSelsoviet: Sanyyakhtakhsky Rural Okrug

Population
  - Estimate (2002): 699 )

Administrative status
  - Capital of: Sanyyakhtakhsky Rural Okrug

Municipal status
  - Municipal district: Olyokminsky Municipal District
  - Rural settlement: Sanyyakhtakhsky Rural Settlement
  - Capital of: Sanyyakhtakhsky Rural Settlement
- Time zone: UTC+
- Postal code: 678134
- OKTMO ID: 98641460101

Sanyyakhtakh (Russian: Саныяхтах) is a rural locality (a selo) and the administrative center of Sanyyakhtakhsky Rural Okrug of Olyokminsky District in the Sakha Republic, Russia, located 235 kilometers (146 mi) from Olyokminsk, the administrative center of the district. Its population as of the 2002 Census was 699.
