= Olyokminsky District =

Olyokminsky District Олёкминский улус (Russian)
- District

Other transcription(s)
  - Sakha: Өлүөхүмэ улууhа
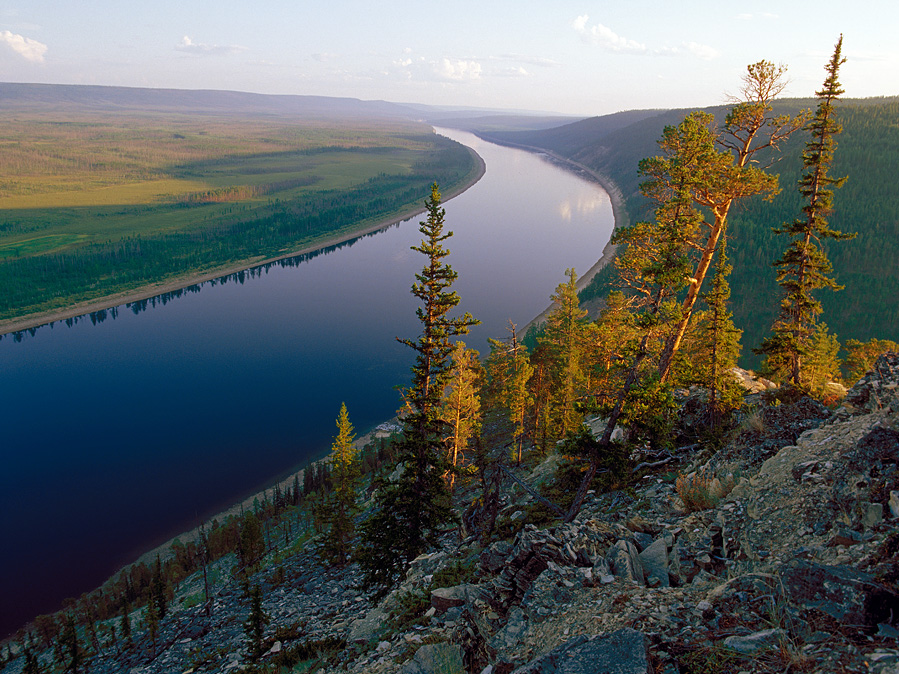
- Olyokma river, Olyokminsky District

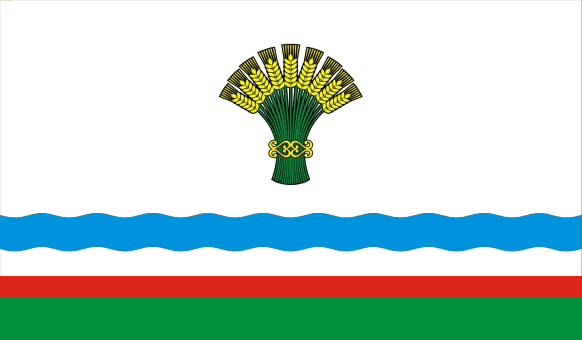
- Flag Coat of arms
- Location of Olyokminsky District in the Sakha Republic
- Coordinates: 60°23′N 120°26′E
- Country: Russia
- Federal subject: Sakha Republic
- Established: January 9, 1930
- Administrative center: Olyokminsk

Area
  - Total: 160,800 km^{2} (62,100 sq mi)

Population (2010 Census)
  - Total: 26,785
  - Density: 0.1666/km^{2} (0.4314/sq mi)
  - Urban: 35.4%
  - Rural: 64.6%

Administrative structure
  - Administrative divisions: 1 Towns under district jurisdiction, 1 Settlements, 21 Rural okrugs
  - Inhabited localities: 1 cities/towns, 1 urban-type settlements, 52 rural localities

Municipal structure
  - Municipally incorporated as: Olyokminsky Municipal District
  - Municipal divisions: 1 urban settlements, 22 rural settlements
- Time zone: UTC+
- OKTMO ID: 98641000

Olyokminsky District (Russian: Олёкминский улу́с; Yakut: Өлүөхүмэ улууһа, Ölüöxüme uluuha) is an administrative and municipal district (raion, or ulus), one of the thirty-four in the Sakha Republic, Russia. It is located in the southwest of the republic and borders with Verkhnevilyuysky District in the north, Gorny and Khangalassky Districts in the northeast, Aldansky District in the east, Neryungrinsky District in the southeast, Zabaykalsky Krai in the southwest, Irkutsk Oblast and Lensky District in the west, and with Suntarsky District in the northwest. The area of the district is 160,800 square kilometers (62,100 sq mi). Its administrative center is the town of Olyokminsk. Population: 26,785 (2010 census); 27,563 (2002 Census); 30,938 (1989 Soviet census). The town of Olyokminsk accounts for 35.4% of the district's total population.

== Geography ==
The main rivers of the district include the Lena and its tributaries, such as the Olyokma, Cherendey, Namana, Keyikte and Biryuk. The Olyokma-Chara Plateau is located to the west of the Olyokma River's western bank. The Olyokma Nature Reserve is part of the district.

=== Climate ===
Average January temperature ranges from −30 to −35 °C (−22 to −31 °F) and average July temperature ranges from +12 °C (54 °F) in the mountains to +18 °C (64 °F) in the valleys. Average annual precipitation is 200–300 millimeters (7.9–11.8 in).

== History ==
The district was established on January 9, 1930.

== Demographics ==
As of the 2021 Census, the ethnic composition was as follows:

- Russians: 48.2%
- Yakuts: 42.1%
- Evenks: 6.0%
- Tatars: 1.3%
- Evens: 0.5%
- others - 1.9%

== Economy ==
The economy of the district is based mostly on agriculture and mining. There are deposits of gold and construction materials in the district. The only deposit of charoite known in the world is located on the district's territory.

== Inhabited localities ==
Municipal composition
Towns / Cities	Population	Male	Female	Inhabited localities in jurisdiction
Olyokminsk (Олекминск)	10,734	5,224 (48.7%)	5,510 (51.3%)	**Town of Olyokminsk** (administrative centre of the district); selo of Aviaport; selo of Zaton LORPa; selo of Neftebaza; selo of Selivanovo
Urban settlements	Population	Male	Female	Inhabited localities in jurisdiction
Torgo (Торго)	0	0 (n/a %)	0 (n/a %)	**Urban-type settlement of Torgo**
Rural settlements	Population	Male	Female	Rural localities in jurisdiction*
Abaginsky Nasleg (Абагинский)	1,190	559 (47.0%)	631 (53.0%)	**selo of Abaga**; selo of Abaga Tsentralnaya
Dabansky Nasleg (Дабанский)	535	263 (49.2%)	272 (50.8%)	**selo of Daban**; selo of Kochegarovo; selo of Cherendey
Delgeysky Nasleg (Дельгейский)	569	272 (47.8%)	297 (52.2%)	**selo of Delgey**; selo of Innyakh
Zharkhansky National Nasleg (Жарханский национальный)	1,373	685 (49.9%)	688 (50.1%)	**selo of Tokko**; selo of Zharkhan; selo of Uolbut
Kindigirsky National Nasleg (Киндигирский национальный)	354	163 (46.0%)	191 (54.0%)	**selo of Kudu-Kyuyol**; selo of Dikimdya
Kyllakhsky Nasleg (Кыллахский)	1,146	583 (50.9%)	563 (48.1%)	**selo of Kyllakh**; selo of Dapparay
Kyachchinsky Nasleg (Кяччинский)	411	228 (55.5%)	183 (44.5%)	**selo of Kyachchi**; selo of Tegen; selo of Kiliyer; selo of Olom
Malzhagarsky Nasleg (Мальжагарский)	1,089	560 (51.4%)	529 (48.6%)	**selo of Yunkyur**; selo of Kuranda; selo of Tyubya
Machinsky Nasleg (Мачинский)	407	239 (58.7%)	168 (41.3%)	**selo of Macha**
Neryuktyayinsky 1-y Nasleg (Нерюктяйинский 1-й)	1,436	703 (49.0%)	733 (51.0%)	**selo of Neryuktyayinsk 1-y**; selo of Biryuk; selo of Kudu-Byas; selo of Tas-Anna
Neryuktyayinsky 2-y Nasleg (Нерюктяйинский 2-й)	956	451 (47.2%)	505 (52.8%)	**selo of Neryuktyayinsk 2-y**; selo of Berdinka; selo of Kholgo
Olyokminsky Nasleg (Олекминский)	1,027	486 (47.3%)	541 (%)	**selo of Olyokminsky**
Sanyyakhtakhsky Nasleg (Саныяхтахский)	987	532 (53.9%)	455 (46.1%)	**selo of Sanyyakhtakh**; selo of Alexeyevka; selo of Malykan; selo of Markha
Solyansky Nasleg (Солянский)	433	224 (51.7%)	209 (48.3%)	**selo of Solyanka**; selo of Kharyyalakh
Troitsky Nasleg (Троицкий)	353	187 (53.0%)	166 (47.0%)	**selo of Troitsk**
Tyantsky National Nasleg (Тянский национальный)	499	272 (54.5%)	227 (45.5%)	**selo of Tyanya**
Ulakhan-Mungkunsky Nasleg (Улахан-Мунгкунский)	394	209 (53.0%)	185 (47.0%)	**selo of Ulakhan-Mungku**
Uritsky Nasleg (Урицкий)	313	159 (20.8%)	154 (49.2%)	**selo of Uritskoye**; selo of Khating-Tumul
Khorinsky Nasleg (Хоринский)	812	410 (50.5%)	402 (49.5%)	**selo of Khorintsy**; selo of Balagannakh; selo of Mekimdya
Chapayevsky Nasleg (Чапаевский)	932	513 (55.0%)	419 (45.0%)	**selo of Chapayevo**; selo of Tinnaya
Charinsky National Nasleg (Чаринский национальный)	215	109 (50.7%)	106 (49.3%)	**selo of Byas-Kyuyol**
Villages	Population	Male	Female	Villages in jurisdiction*
Zarechny Village (Заречный)	620	327 (52.7%)	293 (47.3%)	**selo of Zarechny**

Divisional source:
Population source:
*Administrative centers are shown in bold
