= Olyokminsk =

Olyokminsk Олёкминск
- Town under district jurisdiction

Other transcription(s)
  - Yakut: Өлүөхүмэ
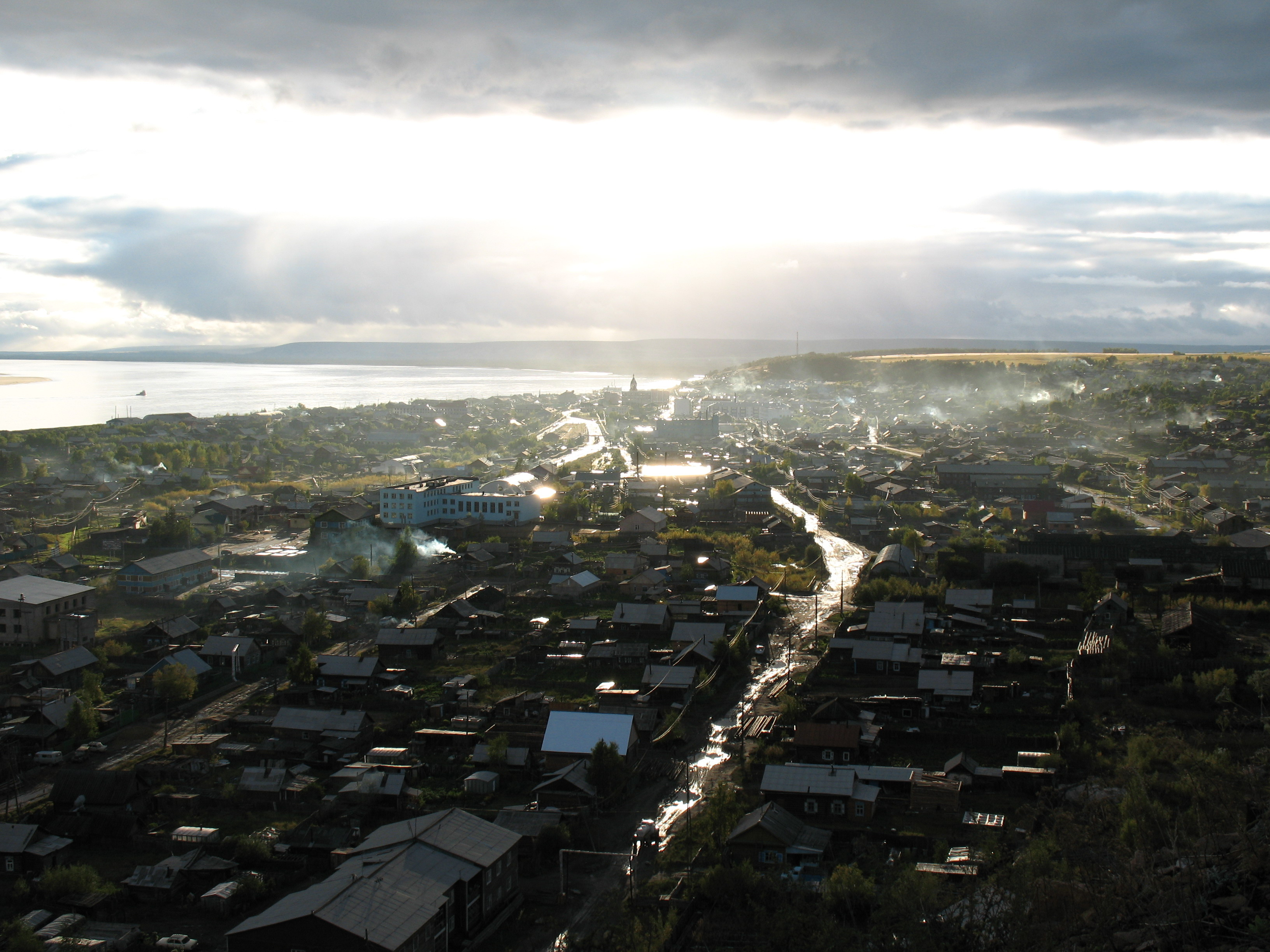
- Aerial view of Olyokminsk in afternoon

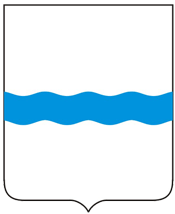
- Coat of arms
- Interactive map of Olyokminsk
- Location of Olyokminsk Olyokminsk (Sakha Republic)
- Coordinates: 60°22′N 120°25′E
- Country: Russia
- Federal subject: Sakha Republic
- Administrative district: Olyokminsky District
- TownSelsoviet: Olyokminsk
- Founded: 1635
- Town status since: 1783

Government
  - Head: Semyon Fedulov
- Elevation: 150 m (490 ft)

Population (2010 Census)
  - Total: 9,494
  - Estimate (2023): 8,457 (−10.9%)

Administrative status
  - Capital of: Olyokminsky District, Town of Olyokminsk

Municipal status
  - Municipal district: Olyokminsky Municipal District
  - Urban settlement: Olyokminsk Urban Settlement
  - Capital of: Olyokminsky Municipal District, Olyokminsk Urban Settlement
- Time zone: UTC+
- Postal codes: 678100, 678139
- Dialing code: +7 41138
- OKTMO ID: 98641101001

Olyokminsk population
- 2010 Census: 9,494
- 2002 Census: 10,003
- 1989 Census: 11,478
- 1979 Census: 10,595

Olyokminsk (Russian: Олёкминск, IPA: [ɐˈlʲɵkmʲɪnsk]; Yakut: Өлүөхүмэ, Ölüöxüme) is a town and the administrative center of Olyokminsky District in the Sakha Republic, Russia, 651 kilometers (405 mi) southwest of Yakutsk, the capital of the republic. As of the 2010 Census, its population was 9,494.

== History ==
It was founded in 1635 as an ostrog by the Cossacks led by Pyotr Beketov, sited on the left bank of the Lena opposite the mouth of the Olyokma River. The outpost was later moved a few kilometers upstream, to a location less prone to flooding in spring.

As the junction for river traffic on the Lena and Olyokma, it was the base for Russian expeditions further east and eventually became a trade center on the river route to Yakutsk. Town status was granted to it in 1783.

Decembrists Nikolay Chizhov and Andrey Andreyev were exiled here.

During World War II, an airfield was built here for the Alaska-Siberian (ALSIB) air route used to ferry American Lend-Lease aircraft to the Eastern Front.

== Geography ==
The town is located on the left bank of the Lena River. To the north rises the Lena Plateau and to the south, beyond the right bank of the Lena, lies the Olyokma-Chara Plateau.

== Administrative and municipal status ==
Within the framework of administrative divisions, Olyokminsk serves as the administrative center of Olyokminsky District. As an inhabited locality, Olyokminsk is classified as a town under district jurisdiction. As an administrative division, it is, together with four rural localities, incorporated within Olyokminsky District as the Town of Olyokminsk. As a municipal division, the Town of Olyokminsk is incorporated within Olyokminsky Municipal District as Olyokminsk Urban Settlement.

== Economy and infrastructure ==
Timber processing and a power plant are the focus of the town's economy, along with farming in the surrounding area.

=== Transportation ===
Olyokminsk is served by the Olyokminsk Airport (IATA: OLZ).

== Culture and sights ==
The town is notable for a number of surviving pre-20th century wooden architecture, including the Alexander Nevsky Chapel (1891) and Cathedral of Our Savior (1860).

== Climate ==
Olyokminsk has a subarctic climate (Köppen climate classification Dfc). Winters have temperatures averaging from −34.6 to −26.6 °C (−30.3 to −15.9 °F) in January, while summers have average temperatures from +12.0 to +24.9 °C (53.6 to 76.8 °F) in July. In the summer months of June, July, and August, it is not uncommon for temperatures to surpass +30 °C (86 °F) during the day. Precipitation is significantly higher in summer than at other times of the year. Although summers are similar to republic capital Yakutsk, winters are less severe courtesy of the lower latitude. As a result, Olyokminsk is rare for the Sakha Republic cities in that it has recorded above-freezing temperatures during January and February. Those episodes are rare and very short-lived.

On August 6, 1986, Olyokminsk recorded its highest ever temperature of +37.7 °C (99.9 °F). The record low for Olyokminsk was −60.1 °C (−76.2 °F) in 1907. July is the only month when temperatures never dropped below 0 °C (32 °F) and December is only month when temperatures have never reached 0 °C (32 °F).

Climate data for Olyokminsk (1991-2020 normals, extremes 1882-present)
Month	Jan	Feb	Mar	Apr	May	Jun	Jul	Aug	Sep	Oct	Nov	Dec	Year
Record high °C (°F)	2.0 (35.6)	1.0 (33.8)	11.2 (52.2)	18.8 (65.8)	31.1 (88.0)	35.4 (95.7)	36.5 (97.7)	37.7 (99.9)	26.6 (79.9)	18.2 (64.8)	6.1 (43.0)	−0.7 (30.7)	37.7 (99.9)
Mean daily maximum °C (°F)	−26.0 (−14.8)	−19.9 (−3.8)	−7.7 (18.1)	4.0 (39.2)	13.8 (56.8)	23.0 (73.4)	25.1 (77.2)	21.3 (70.3)	11.8 (53.2)	−0.5 (31.1)	−16.4 (2.5)	−26.8 (−16.2)	0.1 (32.3)
Daily mean °C (°F)	−30.0 (−22.0)	−25.4 (−13.7)	−14.8 (5.4)	−2.4 (27.7)	7.4 (45.3)	15.9 (60.6)	18.5 (65.3)	14.7 (58.5)	6.2 (43.2)	−4.7 (23.5)	−20.4 (−4.7)	−30.5 (−22.9)	−5.5 (22.2)
Mean daily minimum °C (°F)	−33.9 (−29.0)	−30.3 (−22.5)	−21.6 (−6.9)	−8.9 (16.0)	1.1 (34.0)	8.7 (47.7)	12.2 (54.0)	8.9 (48.0)	1.3 (34.3)	−8.7 (16.3)	−24.4 (−11.9)	−34.3 (−29.7)	−10.8 (12.5)
Record low °C (°F)	−60.1 (−76.2)	−57.6 (−71.7)	−47.4 (−53.3)	−35.1 (−31.2)	−16.1 (3.0)	−4.7 (23.5)	0.2 (32.4)	−4.7 (23.5)	−13.7 (7.3)	−32.1 (−25.8)	−49.1 (−56.4)	−57.2 (−71.0)	−60.1 (−76.2)
Average precipitation mm (inches)	16.9 (0.67)	13.8 (0.54)	9.5 (0.37)	10.2 (0.40)	35.7 (1.41)	40.2 (1.58)	58.1 (2.29)	56.2 (2.21)	43.2 (1.70)	20.8 (0.82)	22.5 (0.89)	19.0 (0.75)	346.1 (13.63)
Average rainy days	0	0	0.2	3	15	16	15	15	16	5	0.1	0	85.3
Average snowy days	27	23	18	11	3	0.1	0	0	2	20	27	27	158.1
Average relative humidity (%)	80	79	71	60	57	63	69	74	75	77	82	80	72
Mean monthly sunshine hours	38	116	211	249	268	295	308	241	152	93	60	17	2,048
Source 1: pogoda.ru.net
Source 2: NOAA (sun only, 1961-1990)
