= Suola =

Suola (Russian: Суола) may refer to:

- Suola (river), Sakha Republic, Russia

Rural localities

- Suola, Meldekhsinsky Rural Okrug, Megino-Kangalassky District, Sakha Republic, a selo in Meldekhsinsky Rural Okrug
- Suola, Moruksky Rural Okrug, Megino-Kangalassky District, Sakha Republic, a selo in Moruksky Rural Okrug
