= Tyokhtyur =

Tyokhtyur (Russian: Тёхтюр) is the name of several rural localities in Russia:

- Tyokhtyur, Khangalassky District, Sakha Republic, a selo in Tekhtyursky Rural Okrug of Khangalassky District of the Sakha Republic
- Tyokhtyur, Megino-Kangalassky District, Sakha Republic, a selo in Zhankhadinsky Rural Okrug of Megino-Kangalassky District of the Sakha Republic
