= Khocho =

Khocho Хочо
- Selo

Other transcription(s)
  - Yakut: Хочо
- Interactive map of Khocho
- Location of Khocho Khocho (Sakha Republic)
- Coordinates: 61°34′N 130°44′E
- Country: Russia
- Federal subject: Sakha Republic
- Administrative district: Megino-Kangalassky District
- Rural okrugSelsoviet: Nakharinsky 2-y Rural Okrug

Population (2010 Census)
  - Total: 622
  - Estimate (2021): 509 (−18.2%)

Administrative status
  - Capital of: Nakharinsky 2-y Rural Okrug

Municipal status
  - Municipal district: Megino-Kangalassky Municipal District
  - Rural settlement: Nakharinsky 2-y Rural Settlement
  - Capital of: Nakharinsky 2-y Rural Settlement
- Time zone: UTC+
- Postal code: 678085
- OKTMO ID: 98629440101

Khocho (Russian: Хочо; Yakut: Хочо, Xoço) is a rural locality (a selo), the only inhabited locality, and the administrative center of Nakharinsky 2-y Rural Okrug of Megino-Kangalassky District in the Sakha Republic, Russia, located 37 kilometers (23 mi) from Mayya, the administrative center of the district. Its population as of the 2010 Census was 622, down from 778 recorded during the 2002 Census.

== Geography ==
Khocho is located in the upper reaches of the Myla river, 30 kilometres (19 mi) southeast of Mayya, 62 kilometres (39 mi) from Nizhny Bestyakh and 74 kilometres (46 mi) from Yakutsk. The village is surrounded by taiga and numerous small lakes.
