= Matta, Russia =

Matta Матта
- Selo
- Interactive map of Matta
- Location of Matta Matta (Sakha Republic)
- Coordinates: 62°22′N 130°47′E
- Country: Russia
- Federal subject: Sakha Republic
- Administrative district: Megino-Kangalassky District
- Rural okrugSelsoviet: Megyuryonsky Rural Okrug

Population
  - Estimate (2002): 511 )

Administrative status
  - Capital of: Megyuryonsky Rural Okrug

Municipal status
  - Municipal district: Megino-Kangalassky Municipal District
  - Rural settlement: Megyuryonsky Rural Settlement
  - Capital of: Megyuryonsky Rural Settlement
- Time zone: UTC+
- Postal code: 678088
- OKTMO ID: 98629407101

Matta (Russian: Матта; Yakut: Матта) is a rural locality (a selo), the administrative centre of and one of two settlements, in addition to Kerdyugen, in Megyuryonsky Rural Okrug of Megino-Kangalassky District in the Sakha Republic, Russia. It is located 85 kilometers (53 mi) from Nizhny Bestyakh, the administrative center of the district. Its population as of the 2002 Census was 511.
