= Nuoragana =

Nuoragana Нуорагана
- Selo
- Interactive map of Nuoragana
- Location of Nuoragana Nuoragana (Sakha Republic)
- Coordinates: 62°09′N 131°04′E
- Country: Russia
- Federal subject: Sakha Republic
- Administrative district: Megino-Kangalassky District
- Rural okrugSelsoviet: Zhabylsky Rural Okrug

Population (2010 Census)
  - Total: 718
  - Estimate (2021): 639 (−11%)

Administrative status
  - Capital of: Zhabylsky Rural Okrug

Municipal status
  - Municipal district: Megino-Kangalassky Municipal District
  - Rural settlement: Zhabylsky Rural Settlement
  - Capital of: Zhabylsky Rural Settlement
- Time zone: UTC+
- Postal code: 678076
- OKTMO ID: 98629408101

Nuoragana (Russian: Нуорагана; Yakut: Нуораҕана, Nuorağana) is a rural locality (a selo), the only inhabited locality, and the administrative center of Zhabylsky Rural Okrug of Megino-Kangalassky District in the Sakha Republic, Russia, located 76 kilometers (47 mi) from Mayya, the administrative center of the district. Its population as of the 2010 Census was 718, down from 773 recorded during the 2002 Census.
