= Rassoloda =

Rassoloda Рассолода
- Selo
- Location of Rassoloda
- Location of Rassoloda Rassoloda (Sakha Republic)
- Coordinates: 61°41′N 129°39′E
- Country: Russia
- Federal subject: Sakha Republic
- Administrative district: Megino-Kangalassky District
- Rural okrug: Rassolodinsky Rural Okrug

Population (2010 Census)
  - Total: 472

Administrative status
  - Capital of: Rassolodinsky Rural Okrug

Municipal status
  - Municipal district: Megino-Kangalassky Municipal District
  - Rural settlement: Rassolodinsky Rural Settlement
  - Capital of: Rassolodinsky Rural Settlement
- Time zone: UTC+9 (MSK+6)
- Postal code(s): 678087
- OKTMO ID: 98629447101

Rassoloda (Russian: Рассолода; Yakut: Ороссолуода, Orossoluoda) is a rural locality (a selo), the only inhabited locality, and the administrative center of Rassolodinsky Rural Okrug of Megino-Kangalassky District in the Sakha Republic, Russia, located 47 kilometers (29 mi) from Mayya, the administrative center of the district. Its population as of the 2010 Census was 472, down from 566 recorded during the 2002 Census.
