= Myla (river) =

River in Yakutia (Sakha Republic), Russia

Myla Мыла
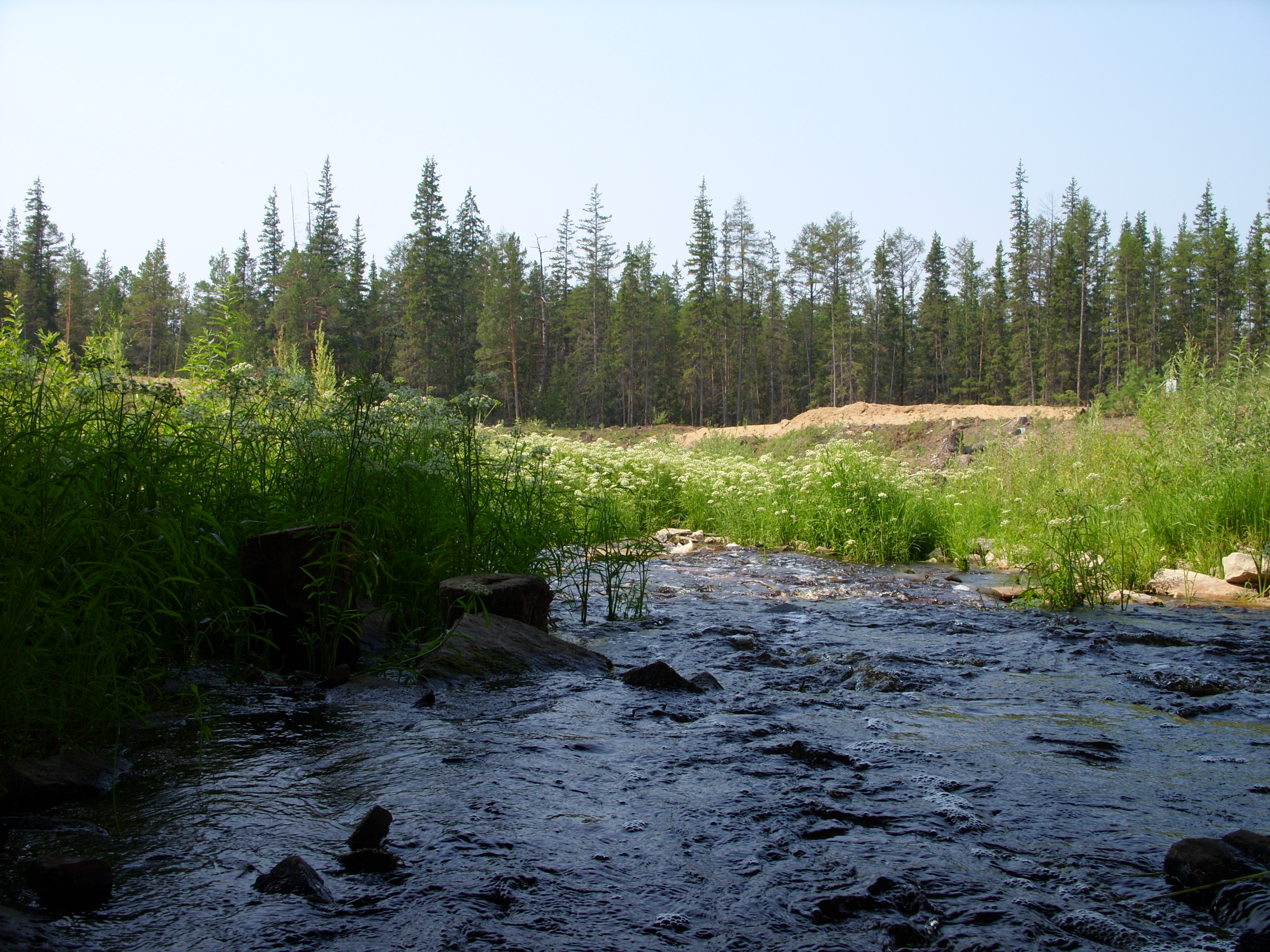
- View of the river

- Mouth location in Yakutia, Russia

Location
- Country: Russia

Physical characteristics
- Source
  - location: Near Khocho
  - coordinates: 61°34′26″N 130°45′51″E
  - elevation: 240 m (790 ft)
- Mouth: Lena
  - location: Near Khaptagay
  - coordinates: 61°48′17″N 129°47′24″E
  - elevation: 87 m (285 ft)
- Length: 101 km (63 mi)
- Basin size: 1,410 km^{2} (540 sq mi)

Basin features
- Progression: Lena→ Laptev Sea

The Myla (Russian: Мыла) is a river in Yakutia (Sakha Republic), Russia. It is a tributary of the Lena with a length of 101 kilometres (63 mi) and a drainage basin area of 1,410 square kilometres (540 mi^{2}).

The Myla is one of the largest rivers of Megino-Kangalassky District. The villages of Khocho, Tympai, Olyongnekh-Sayylyk and Khaptagay are located near the river.

== Course ==
The Myla is a right tributary of the Lena. It is formed near Khocho village in a taiga area with numerous small lakes. The river heads in a roughly northwestern direction, between the Tamma to the south and the Suola to the north across Megino-Kangalassky District. In the upper course there are stretches where it flows across lakes and parts where it may dry up in certain years. After flowing across the Lena floodplain, the Myla meets the Khaptagay arm of the right bank of the Lena 1,526 kilometres (948 mi) from its source near the village of Khaptagay, south of Yakutsk.

The largest tributary of the Myla is the 13 kilometres (8.1 mi) long Bez Nazvaniya (без названия) from the right. The river freezes between October and May.

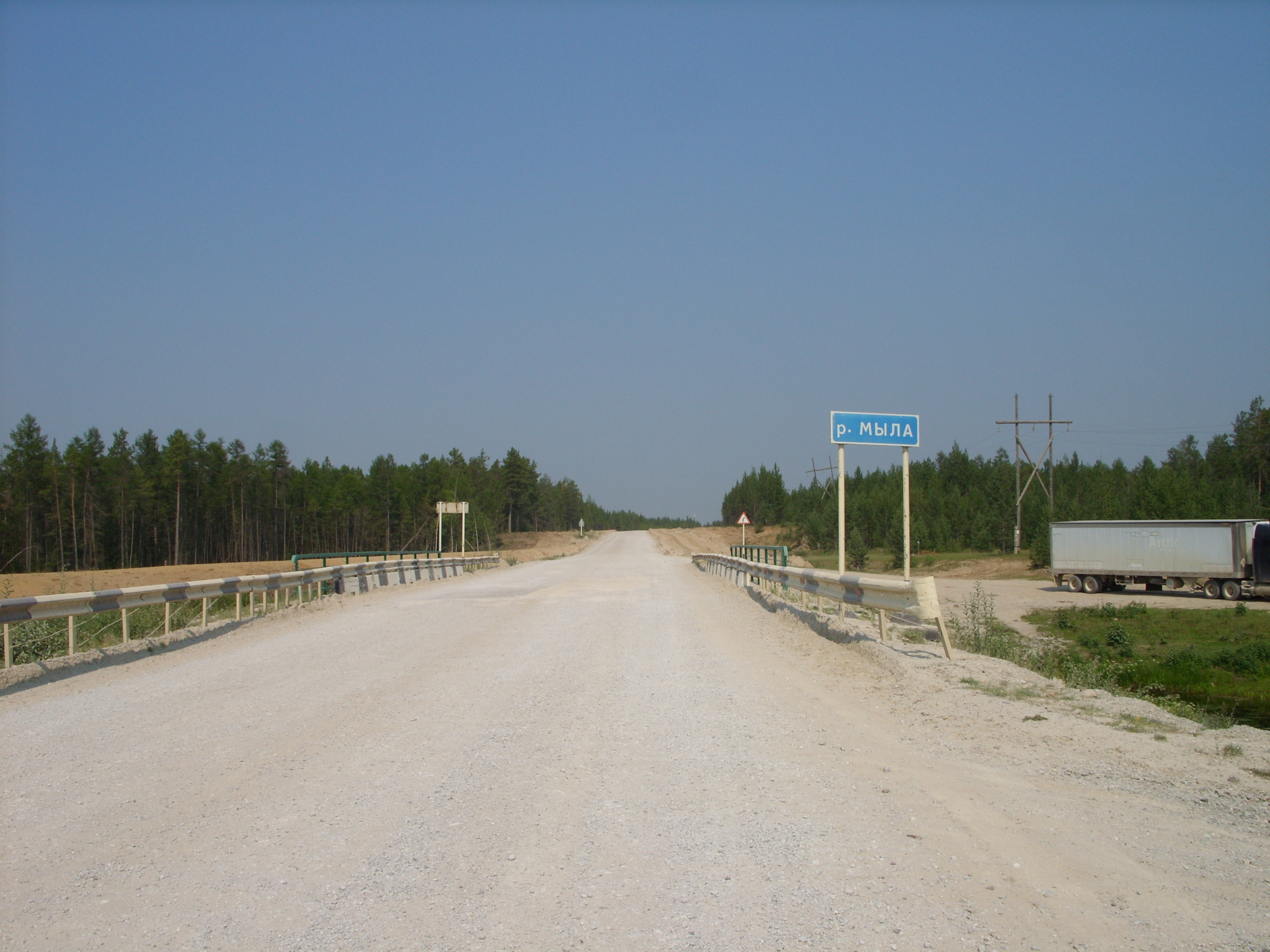
Highway bridge across the Myla.

== See also ==
- List of rivers of Russia
