= Pavlovsk, Sakha Republic =

Pavlovsk Павловск
- Selo
- Interactive map of Pavlovsk
- Location of Pavlovsk Pavlovsk (Sakha Republic)
- Coordinates: 61°52′N 129°53′E
- Country: Russia
- Federal subject: Sakha Republic
- Administrative district: Megino-Kangalassky District
- Rural okrugSelsoviet: Nyeryuktyayinsky Rural Okrug

Population
  - Estimate (2002): 2,091 )

Administrative status
  - Capital of: Nyeryuktyayinsky Rural Okrug

Municipal status
  - Municipal district: Megino-Kangalassky Municipal District
  - Rural settlement: Nyeryuktyayinsky Rural Settlement
  - Capital of: Nyeryuktyayinsky Rural Settlement
- Time zone: UTC+
- Postal code: 678082
- OKTMO ID: 98629445101

Pavlovsk (Russian: Павловск; Yakut: Нөөрүктээйи, Nöörükteeyi) is a rural locality (a selo), the administrative centre of and one of two settlements, in addition to Khomustakh, in Nyeryuktyayinsky Rural Okrug of Megino-Kangalassky District in the Sakha Republic, Russia. It is located 44 kilometers (27 mi) from Nizhny Bestyakh, the administrative center of the district. Its population as of the 2002 Census was 2,091.
