= Tabaga, Megino-Kangalassky District, Sakha Republic =

Rural locality in the Sakha Republic, Russia

Tabaga Табага
- Selo
- Interactive map of Tabaga
- Location of Tabaga Tabaga (Sakha Republic)
- Coordinates: 61°40′N 130°57′E
- Country: Russia
- Federal subject: Sakha Republic
- Administrative district: Megino-Kangalassky District
- Rural okrugSelsoviet: Taragaysky Rural Okrug

Population (2010 Census)
  - Total: 892
  - Estimate (2021): 784 (−12.1%)

Administrative status
  - Capital of: Taragaysky Rural Okrug

Municipal status
  - Municipal district: Megino-Kangalassky District
  - Rural settlement: Taragaysky Rural Settlement
  - Capital of: Taragaysky Rural Settlement
- Time zone: UTC+
- Postal code: 678077
- OKTMO ID: 98629448101

Tabaga (Russian: Табага; Yakut: Табаҕа, Tabağa) is a rural locality (a selo), the only inhabited locality, and the administrative center of Taragaysky Rural Okrug of Megino-Kangalassky District in the Sakha Republic, Russia, located 38 kilometers (24 mi) from Nizhny Bestyakh, the administrative center of the district. Its population as of the 2010 Census was 892, of whom 443 were male and 449 female, down from 1,098 as recorded during the 2002 Census.
