= Khapchagay =

Khapchagay Хапчагай
- Selo
- Interactive map of Khapchagay
- Location of Khapchagay Khapchagay (Sakha Republic)
- Coordinates: 62°22′21″N 130°08′33″E
- Country: Russia
- Federal subject: Sakha Republic
- Administrative district: Megino-Kangalassky District
- Rural okrugSelsoviet: Doydunsky Rural Okrug

Population (2010 Census)
  - Total: 132
  - Estimate (2021): 120 (−9.1%)

Administrative status
  - Capital of: Doydunsky Rural Okrug

Municipal status
  - Municipal district: Megino-Kangalassky Municipal District
  - Rural settlement: Doydunsky Rural Settlement
  - Capital of: Doydunsky Rural Settlement
- Time zone: UTC+
- Postal codes: 678083, 678088
- OKTMO ID: 98629413101

Khapchagay (Russian: Хапчагай; Yakut: Хапчаҕай, Xapçağay) is a rural locality (a selo), the only inhabited locality, and the administrative center of Doydunsky Rural Okrug of Megino-Kangalassky District in the Sakha Republic, Russia, located 108 kilometers (67 mi) from Mayya, the administrative center of the district. Its population as of the 2010 Census was 132, down from 133 recorded during the 2002 Census.
