= A360 =

A360 may refer to:

- A360 Lena Highway, a road in the Sakha Republic in Russia
- A360 road, a road in Wiltshire, England
- A360media, an American publisher of books and magazines
