= Kharba-Atakh =

Kharba-Atakh Харба-Атах
- Selo
- Interactive map of Kharba-Atakh
- Location of Kharba-Atakh Kharba-Atakh (Sakha Republic)
- Coordinates: 61°46′N 130°49′E
- Country: Russia
- Federal subject: Sakha Republic
- Administrative district: Megino-Kangalassky District
- Rural okrugSelsoviet: Khorobutsky Rural Okrug

Population
  - Estimate (2002): 20 )

Municipal status
  - Municipal district: Megino-Kangalassky Municipal District
  - Rural settlement: Khorobutsky Rural Settlement
- Time zone: UTC+
- Postal code: 678070
- OKTMO ID: 98629430106

Kharba-Atakh (Russian: Харба-Атах; Yakut: Харба Атах, Xarba Atax) is a rural locality (a selo) in Khorobutsky Rural Okrug of Megino-Kangalassky District in the Sakha Republic, Russia, located 40 kilometers (25 mi) from Nizhny Bestyakh, the administrative center of the district and 12 kilometers (7.5 mi) from Khorobut, the administrative center of the rural okrug. Its population as of the 2002 Census was 20.
