= Kerdyugen =

Kerdyugen Кердюген
- Selo
- Interactive map of Kerdyugen
- Location of Kerdyugen Kerdyugen (Sakha Republic)
- Coordinates: 62°21′N 130°08′E
- Country: Russia
- Federal subject: Sakha Republic
- Administrative district: Megino-Kangalassky District
- Rural okrugSelsoviet: Megyuryonsky Rural Okrug

Population
  - Estimate (2002): 13 )

Municipal status
  - Municipal district: Megino-Kangalassky Municipal District
  - Rural settlement: Doydunsky Rural Settlement
- Time zone: UTC+
- Postal code: 678088
- OKTMO ID: 98629413106

Kerdyugen (Russian: Кердюген; Yakut: Көрдүгэн, Kördügen) is a rural locality (a selo) in Megyuryonsky Rural Okrug of Megino-Kangalassky District in the Sakha Republic, Russia, located 110 kilometers (68 mi) from Mayya, the administrative center of the district, and 25 kilometers (16 mi) from Matta, the administrative center of the rural okrug. Its population as of the 2002 Census was 13.
