= Bedemyo =

Bedemyo Бедемё
- Selo
- Interactive map of Bedemyo
- Location of Bedemyo Bedemyo (Sakha Republic)
- Coordinates: 62°00′N 130°36′E
- Country: Russia
- Federal subject: Sakha Republic
- Administrative district: Megino-Kangalassky District
- Rural okrugSelsoviet: Bedeminsky Rural Okrug
- Founded: 1945

Population (2010 Census)
  - Total: 541
  - Estimate (2021): 506 (−6.5%)

Administrative status
  - Capital of: Bedeminsky Rural Okrug

Municipal status
  - Municipal district: Megino-Kangalassky Municipal District
  - Rural settlement: Bedeminsky Rural Settlement
  - Capital of: Bedeminsky Rural Settlement
- Time zone: UTC+
- Postal code: 678091
- OKTMO ID: 98629406101

Bedemyo (Russian: Бедемё; Yakut: Бэдьимэ, Becime) is a rural locality (a selo), the only inhabited locality, and the administrative center of Bedeminsky Rural Okrug of Megino-Kangalassky District in the Sakha Republic, Russia, located 40 kilometers (25 mi) from Nizhny Bestyakh, the administrative center of the district. Its population as of the 2010 Census was 592, of whom 275 were male and 266 female, the same as recorded during the 2002 Census.
