= Byuteydyakh, Megino-Kangalassky District, Sakha Republic =

Byuteydyakh Бютейдях
- Selo
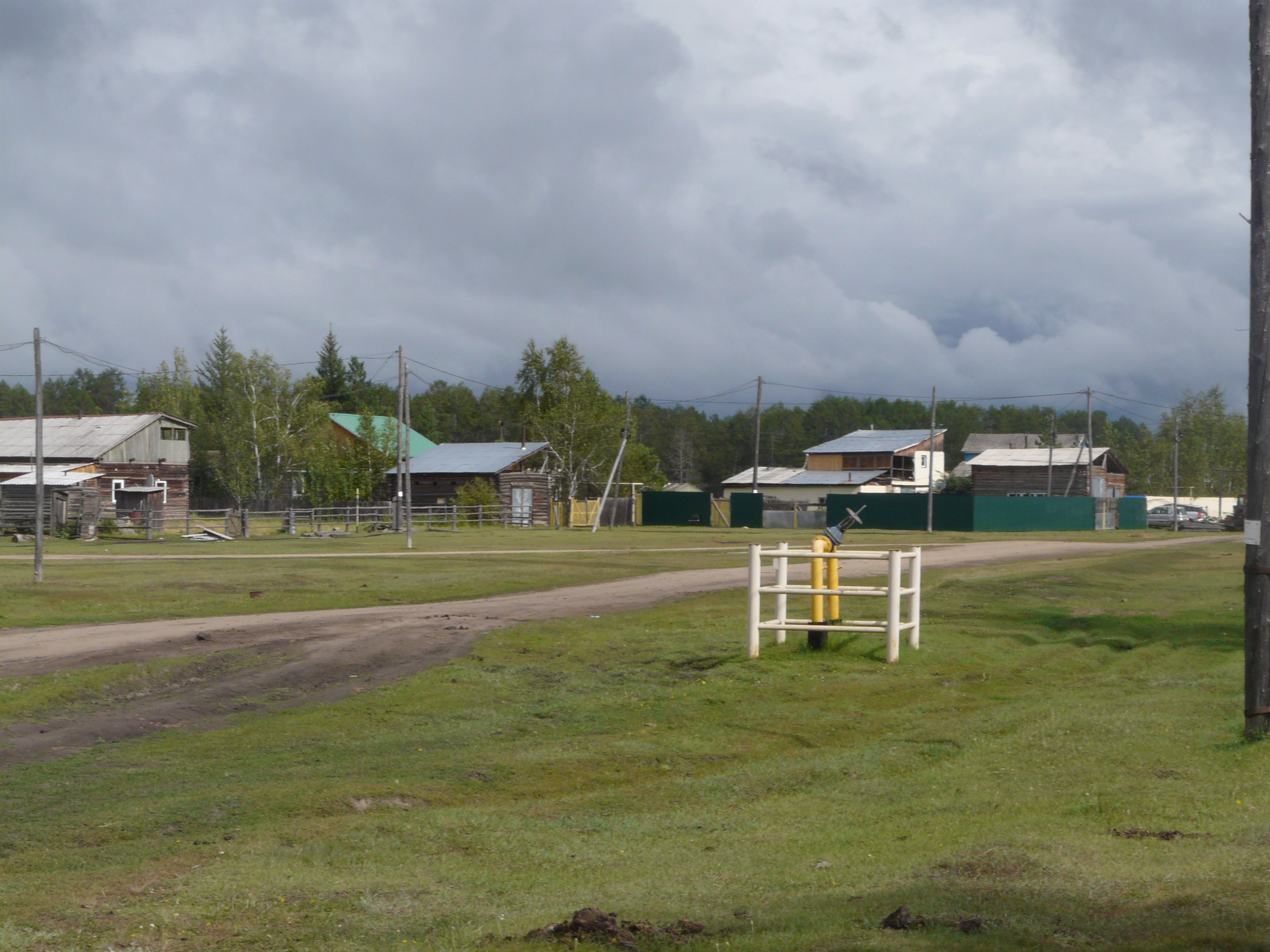
- Interactive map of Byuteydyakh
- Location of Byuteydyakh Byuteydyakh (Sakha Republic)
- Coordinates: 61°38′N 131°21′E
- Country: Russia
- Federal subject: Sakha Republic
- Administrative district: Megino-Kangalassky District
- Rural okrugSelsoviet: Byuteydyakhsky Rural Okrug

Population (2010 Census)
  - Total: 703
  - Estimate (2021): 662 (−5.8%)

Administrative status
  - Capital of: Byuteydyakhsky Rural Okrug

Municipal status
  - Municipal district: Megino-Kangalassky Municipal District
  - Rural settlement: Byuteydyakhsky Rural Settlement
  - Capital of: Byuteydyakhsky Rural Settlement
- Time zone: UTC+
- Postal code: 678074
- OKTMO ID: 98629409101

Byuteydyakh (Russian: Бютейдях; Yakut: Бүтэйдээх, Büteydeex) is a rural locality (a selo), the only inhabited locality, and the administrative center of Byuteydyakhsky Rural Okrug of Megino-Kangalassky District in the Sakha Republic, Russia, located 72 kilometers (45 mi) from Nizhny Bestyakh, the administrative center of the district. Its population as of the 2010 Census was 703, of whom 366 were male and 337 female, down from 871 as recorded during the 2002 Census.

It is one of the centers of population located in the Suola River basin.
