= Symakh =

Symakh Сымах
- Selo
- Interactive map of Symakh
- Location of Symakh Symakh (Sakha Republic)
- Coordinates: 61°55′N 130°56′E
- Country: Russia
- Federal subject: Sakha Republic
- Administrative district: Megino-Kangalassky District
- Rural okrugSelsoviet: Batarinsky Rural Okrug
- Founded: 1777

Population (2010 Census)
  - Total: 502
  - Estimate (2021): 446 (−11.2%)

Administrative status
  - Capital of: Batarinsky Rural Okrug

Municipal status
  - Municipal district: Megino-Kangalassky Municipal District
  - Rural settlement: Batarinsky Rural Settlement
  - Capital of: Batarinsky Rural Settlement
- Time zone: UTC+
- Postal code: 678078
- OKTMO ID: 98629405101

Symakh (Russian: Сымах; Yakut: Сыымах, Sıımax) is a rural locality (a selo), the only inhabited locality, and the administrative center of Batarinsky Rural Okrug of Megino-Kangalassky District in the Sakha Republic, Russia, located 65 kilometers (40 mi) from Nizhny Bestyakh, the administrative center of the district. Its population as of the 2010 Census was 502, of whom 253 were male and 249 female, down from 522 as recorded during the 2002 Census.
