= Suola, Meldekhsinsky Rural Okrug, Megino-Kangalassky District, Sakha Republic =

Suola Суола
- Selo
- Interactive map of Suola
- Location of Suola Suola (Sakha Republic)
- Coordinates: 61°54′N 130°34′E
- Country: Russia
- Federal subject: Sakha Republic
- Administrative district: Megino-Kangalassky District
- Rural okrugSelsoviet: Meldekhsinsky Rural Okrug

Population (2010 Census)
  - Total: 505
  - Estimate (2021): 482 (−4.6%)

Administrative status
  - Capital of: Meldekhsinsky Rural Okrug

Municipal status
  - Municipal district: Megino-Kangalassky Municipal District
  - Rural settlement: Meldekhsinsky Rural Settlement
  - Capital of: Meldekhsinsky Rural Settlement
- Time zone: UTC+
- Postal code: 678073
- OKTMO ID: 98629429101

Suola (Russian: Суола; Yakut: Суола) is a rural locality (a selo) and the administrative center of Meldekhsinsky Rural Okrug of Megino-Kangalassky District in the Sakha Republic, Russia, located 28 kilometers (17 mi) from Mayya, the administrative center of the district. Its population as of the 2010 Census was 505; down from 515 recorded in the 2002 Census.

It is one of the centers of population located in the Suola River basin.
