= Darkylakh =

Darkylakh Даркылах
- Selo
- Interactive map of Darkylakh
- Location of Darkylakh Darkylakh (Sakha Republic)
- Coordinates: 60°58′N 130°24′E
- Country: Russia
- Federal subject: Sakha Republic
- Administrative district: Megino-Kangalassky District
- Rural okrugSelsoviet: Chyamayykinsky Rural Okrug

Population (2010 Census)
  - Total: 434
  - Estimate (2021): 418 (−3.7%)

Administrative status
  - Capital of: Chyamayykinsky Rural Okrug

Municipal status
  - Municipal district: Megino-Kangalassky Municipal District
  - Rural settlement: Chyamayykinsky Rural Settlement
  - Capital of: Chyamayykinsky Rural Settlement
- Time zone: UTC+
- Postal code: 678086
- OKTMO ID: 98629465101

Darkylakh (Russian: Даркылах; Yakut: Даркылаах, Darkılaax) is a rural locality (a selo), the only inhabited locality, and the administrative center of Chyamayykinsky Rural Okrug of Megino-Kangalassky District in the Sakha Republic, Russia, located 122 kilometers (76 mi) from Nizhny Bestyakh, the administrative center of the district. Its population as of the 2010 Census was 434, of whom 222 were male and 212 female, down from 486 as recorded during the 2002 Census.

== Geography ==
The village is located by the Tamma river.
