= Tumul, Megino-Kangalassky District, Sakha Republic =

Tumul Тумул
- Selo
- Interactive map of Tumul
- Location of Tumul Tumul (Sakha Republic)
- Coordinates: 62°11′N 130°38′E
- Country: Russia
- Federal subject: Sakha Republic
- Administrative district: Megino-Kangalassky District
- Rural okrugSelsoviet: Dollunsky Rural Okrug

Population (2010 Census)
  - Total: 578
  - Estimate (2021): 593 (+2.6%)

Administrative status
  - Capital of: Dollunsky Rural Okrug

Municipal status
  - Municipal district: Megino-Kangalassky Municipal District
  - Rural settlement: Dollunsky Rural Settlement
  - Capital of: Dollunsky Rural Settlement
- Time zone: UTC+
- Postal code: 678075
- OKTMO ID: 98629411101

Tumul (Russian: Тумул; Yakut: Тумул) is a rural locality (a selo), the only inhabited locality, and the administrative center of Dollunsky Rural Okrug of Megino-Kangalassky District in the Sakha Republic, Russia, located 67 kilometers (42 mi) from Nizhny Bestyakh, the administrative center of the district. Its population as of the 2010 Census was 578, down from 660 recorded during the 2002 Census.
