= Khorobut =

Khorobutsky Хоробут
- Selo
- Interactive map of Khorobutsky
- Location of Khorobutsky Khorobutsky (Sakha Republic)
- Coordinates: 61°49′N 130°36′E
- Country: Russia
- Federal subject: Sakha Republic
- Administrative district: Megino-Kangalassky District
- Rural okrugSelsoviet: Khorobutsky Rural Okrug
- Founded: 1936

Population
  - Estimate (2002): 1,028 )

Administrative status
  - Capital of: Khorobutsky Rural Okrug

Municipal status
  - Municipal district: Megino-Kangalassky Municipal District
  - Rural settlement: Khorobutsky Rural Settlement
  - Capital of: Khorobutsky Rural Settlement
- Time zone: UTC+
- Postal code: 678073
- OKTMO ID: 98629430101

Khorobut (Russian: Хоробут; Yakut: Хорообут, Xoroobut) is a rural locality (a selo), the administrative centre of and one of two settlements, in addition to Kharba-Atakh, in Khorobutsky Rural Okrug of Megino-Kangalassky District in the Sakha Republic, Russia. It is located 36 kilometers (22 mi) from Nizhny Bestyakh, the administrative center of the district. Its population as of the 2002 Census was 1,028.
