= Lomtuka =

Lomtuka Ломтука
- Selo
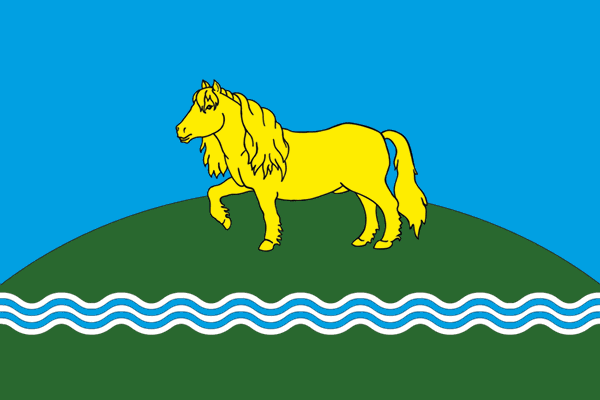
- Flag
- Interactive map of Lomtuka
- Location of Lomtuka Lomtuka (Sakha Republic)
- Coordinates: 61°38′N 130°06′E
- Country: Russia
- Federal subject: Sakha Republic
- Administrative district: Megino-Kangalassky District
- Rural okrugSelsoviet: Tyllyminsky 1-y Rural Okrug
- Founded: 1930

Population (2010 Census)
  - Total: 701
  - Estimate (2021): 663 (−5.4%)

Administrative status
  - Capital of: Tyllyminsky 1-y Rural Okrug

Municipal status
  - Municipal district: Megino-Kangalassky Municipal District
  - Rural settlement: Tyllyminsky 1-y Rural Settlement
  - Capital of: Tyllyminsky 1-y Rural Settlement
- Time zone: UTC+
- Postal code: 678084
- OKTMO ID: 98629450101

Lomtuka (Russian: Ломтука; Yakut: Лоомтука, Loomtuka) is a rural locality (a selo), the only inhabited locality, and the administrative center of Tyllyminsky 1-y Rural Okrug of Megino-Kangalassky District in the Sakha Republic, Russia, located 16 kilometers (9.9 mi) from Mayya, the administrative center of the district. Its population as of the 2010 Census was 701, down from 798 recorded during the 2002 Census.
