= Balyktakh, Megino-Kangalassky District, Sakha Republic =

Balyktakh Балыктах
- Selo
- Interactive map of Balyktakh
- Location of Balyktakh Balyktakh (Sakha Republic)
- Coordinates: 62°12′N 130°51′E
- Country: Russia
- Federal subject: Sakha Republic
- Administrative district: Megino-Kangalassky District
- Rural okrugSelsoviet: Meginsky Rural Okrug
- Founded: 1909

Population (2010 Census)
  - Total: 883
  - Estimate (2021): 759 (−14%)

Administrative status
  - Capital of: Meginsky Rural Okrug

Municipal status
  - Municipal district: Megino-Kangalassky Municipal District
  - Rural settlement: Meginsky Rural Settlement
  - Capital of: Meginsky Rural Settlement
- Time zone: UTC+
- Postal code: 678092
- OKTMO ID: 98629420101

Balyktakh (Russian: Балыктах; Yakut: Балыктаах, Balıktaax) is a rural locality (a selo), the only inhabited locality, and the administrative center of Meginsky Rural Okrug of Megino-Kangalassky District in the Sakha Republic, Russia, located 72 kilometers (45 mi) from Nizhny Bestyakh, the administrative center of the district. Its population as of the 2010 Census was 883, of whom 438 were male and 445 female, down from 963 as recorded during the 2002 Census.
