= A360 Lena Highway =

Road in Russia

Federal Highway A360
- Федеральная автомобильная дорога А360
- Lena Highway
- The map highlights the M56, the bottom half of which is the A360

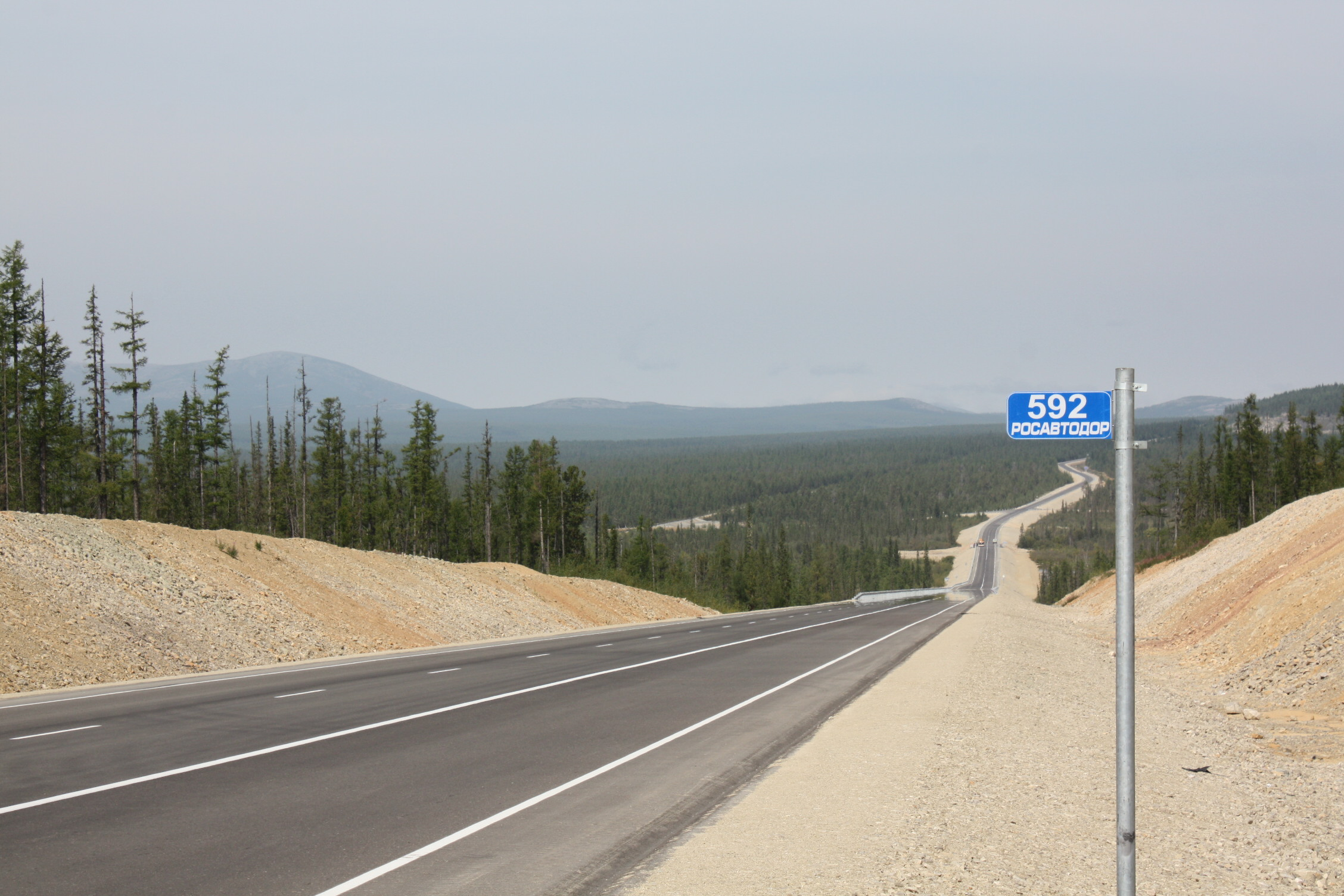
- The road after reconstruction, commissioned in 2014

Route information
- Length: 1,235 km (767 mi)

Major junctions
- North end: R504 at Nizhny Bestyakh
- South end: R 297 near Skovorodino

Location
- Country: Russia

Highway system
- Russian Federal Highways
| ← A 350 | → A 361 |

A360 Lena Highway or The Amur-Yakutsk Highway (Russian: Амуро-Якутская автомобильная дорога or Russian: Амуро-Якутская автомагистраль) is a federal highway in Sakha (Yakutia) in Russia, connecting Yakutsk with the Trans-Siberian Railway corridor near Skovorodino. The road was built in stages between 1925 and 1964.

Stretching parallel to the Amur–Yakutsk Mainline railway, the highway takes its name from the Lena River, which runs more or less north–south in this part of Siberia. The road's southern terminus is at the village of Never near Skovorodino, where it intersects the R297 highway at a cloverleaf junction. With Yakutsk situated entirely on the west bank of Lena, and the road running on the east bank, the highway terminates in Nizhny Bestyakh, a settlement of 4,000 people opposite Yakutsk. When river conditions permit, one may drive right over the frozen river to Yakutsk or take the ferry, but for extended periods the river is impassable due to flooding, ice floes or semi-thawed ice unable to support the weight of vehicles. The only transport working across the river when it is congested with floating ice are helicopters and hovercraft. Construction of a bridge across the Lena river started in October 2024 after years of delays.

At Nizhny Bestyakh, Lena Highway connects to Kolyma Highway (The Road of Bones), designated R504, linking Yakutsk with Magadan on the Pacific Ocean to the east.

Although it is a federal highway, it was just a dirt road until 2014. When frozen in the winter, this made for an excellent surface, and the posted speed limit was 70 kilometres per hour (43 mph). However, in the summer, with any kind of significant rain, the road transformed to impassable mud that often swallowed whole smaller vehicles.

The last problematic part of the highway was paved in 2014 and now it is accessible all throughout the year as far as Tyungyulyu.

== Route ==
- 0 km - Skovorodino (with a connection to the federal highway R297 "Amur")
- 39 km - Solovyovsk
- 170 km - Tynda
- 320 km - Iyengra
- 400 km - Chulman
- 638 km - Aldan
- 712 km - Tommot
- 906 km - Ulu
- 1156 km - Nizhny Bestyakh (with a connection to the federal highway R504 "Kolyma")
- 1168 km - Yakutsk

== Background ==
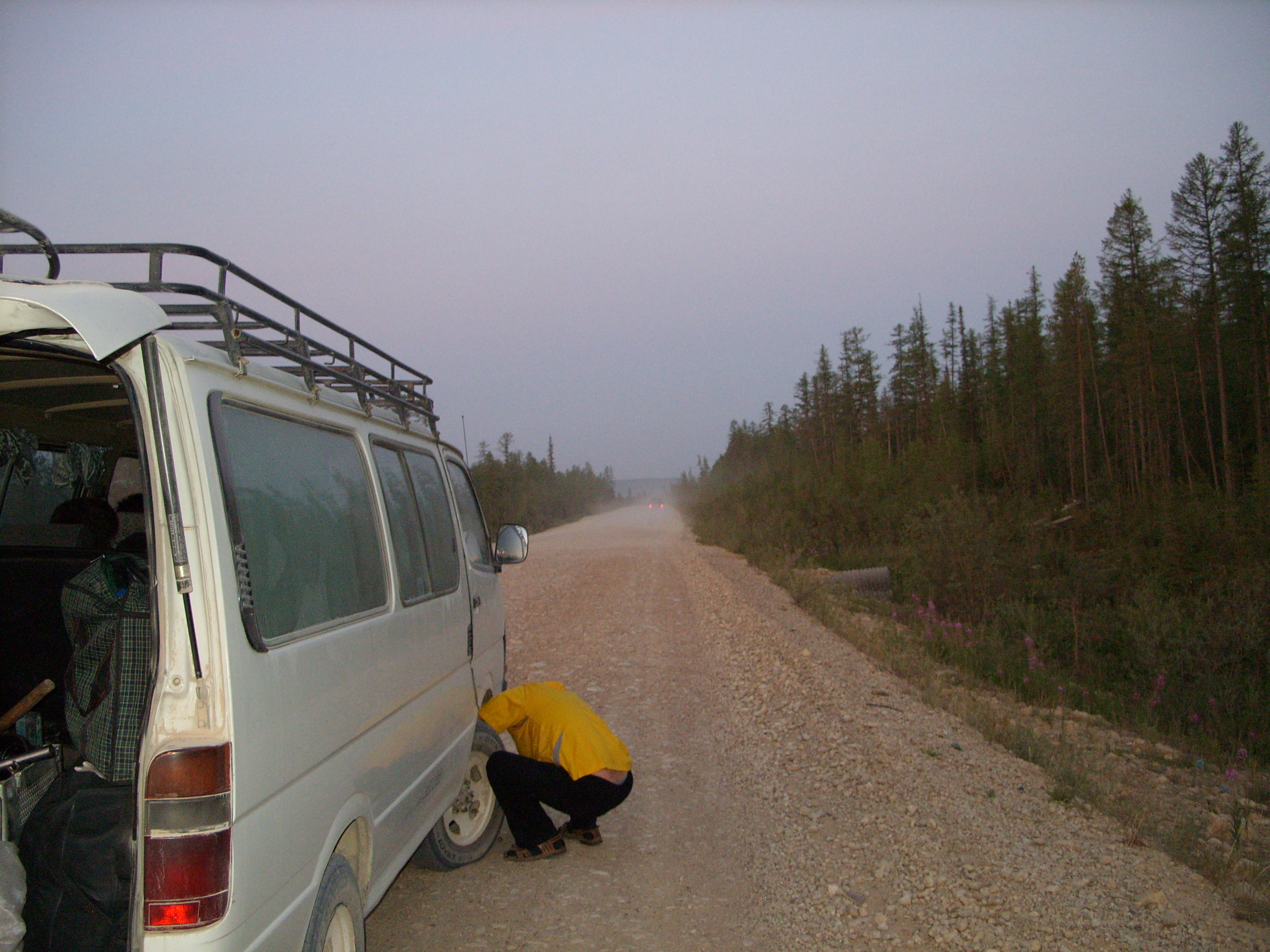
On the section Never-Yakutsk

The history of the federal highway "Lena" is inextricably linked with the start of exploration and development of gold deposits in the upper reaches of the Amur and South Yakutia basins of the Timpton and Aldan rivers.

By the beginning of the 20th century, there were about 150 mines in the Amur region. The need for construction of the "wheel" of the road appeared in the 1870s. The implementation of this task force was launched Upper Amur gold mining joint-stock company, which is using its own funds to build the first 105 miles, which connected the mine Dzhalindinsky on Amur to Nikolayevsk mines in the north of the Amur region.

When the Trans-Siberian Railway was completed, food supply and labor was carried out entirely from the Amur region. From the station Bolshoy Never was built the so-called (at the time) cart-road for cartage. It stretched up to the village of Nagorny. This path is 380–400 km long and is called the "camel trail" or "Tumen path." It was used mainly in winter on ice and compacted snow. Delivery of goods was very expensive, so the Upper Amur company started to build a dirt road. In 1910, the first studies were conducted, and the wheel path from the village Rukhlovo (now Skovorodino) to the Yakut mine to the "top" was made into a ridge of 293 km length with the approach to the Swan mine of 47.5 km length completed in 1916.

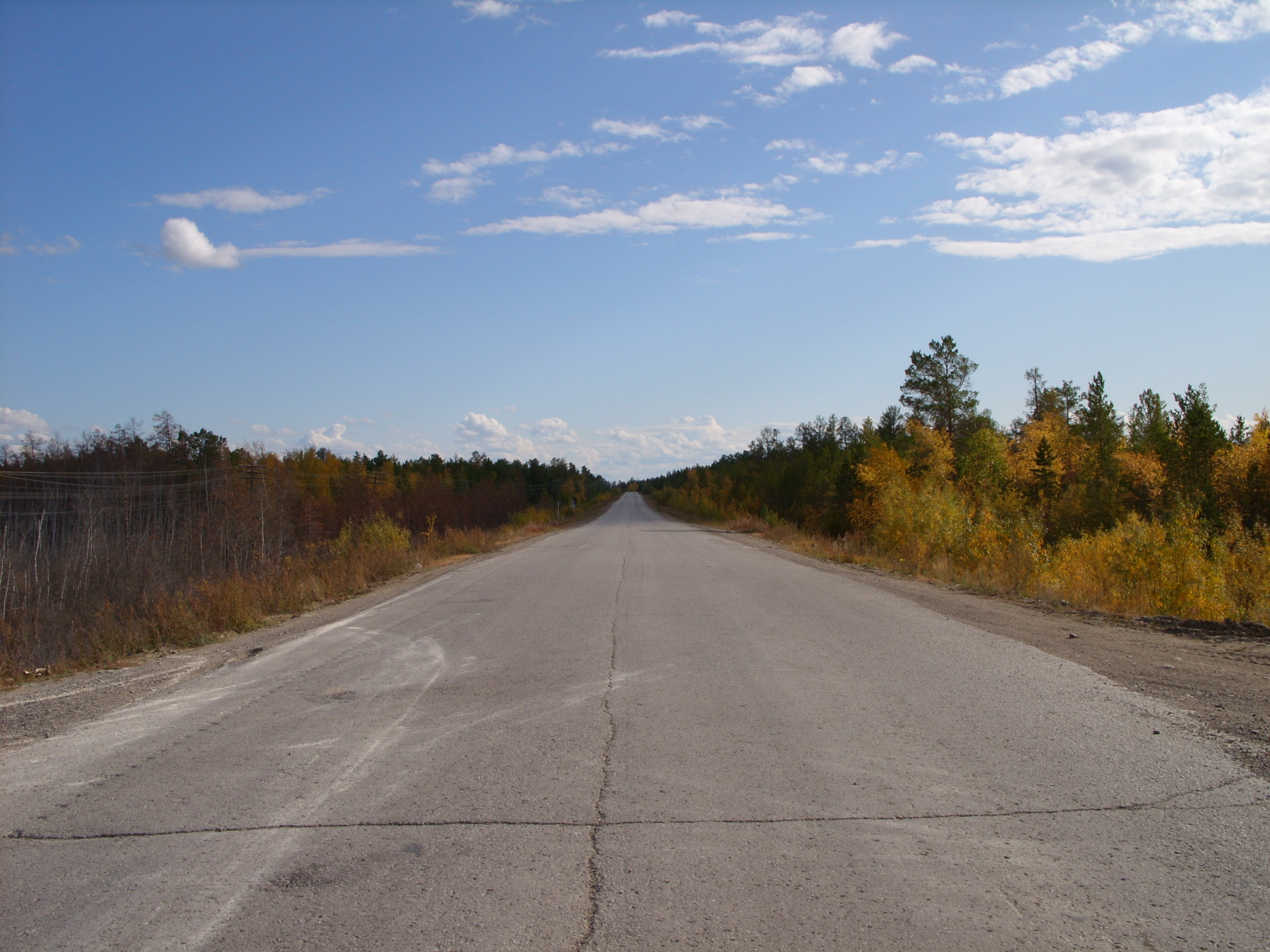
Road in the surroundings of Nizhny Bestyakh

At the same time, from Yakutia to Chulman was passed firebreak width 10 fathoms (21.3metra) and a length of 128 km, which was used as a winter road. At the same time functioned cartage winter road along the river. Timpton of mine Swan (in the basin. Timpton) Chulmakan to the mouth and then in the basin. The constructed Bolshoy Nimnyr road was used not only for movement on carts and gigs, but in winter, it moved on sledges and sleds, when for the first time began to use camels. The initiator of the introduction of this type of transport was one of the agents of the Upper Amur Company, which bought 100 animals in the Trans-Baikal region. Camels are well adapted to local conditions, they were unpretentious, less sensitive to lack of feed and can carry several times more cargo than reindeer and horses. In the future, until the construction of the Amur-Yakutsk highway road is complete, they were used all the way from Dzalinda on the Amur to the Aldan.

Well aware of the great importance of Yakutia for the economy, the Soviet government in May 1925, taking urgent measures to build a road from the Amur River, across the river Aldan, to Yakutsk, began in the same year and went full swing. In parallel with the researches were carried out work on the construction of artificial structures and subgrade over 120 kilometers between the backbone and the river Chulman, and in the autumn of 1925 cuttings from the village unnoticed to Aldan River was completed. The construction seasons of 1926–1927 years in the area from Yablonovy pass - p. Chulman - Obscure etc. -.. N Tommot work continued on the construction of bridges and roadbed device, constructed industrial buildings for road units and houses. By the end of 1927 were carried out engineering survey route of the future highway from n. Tommot toward Yakutsk.

== Reconstruction of the road ==
A new stage in the history of the road came with the adoption of the Russian Federation Government of the Federal Target Program (FTP) "Development of Transport System of Russia (2010-2015)". As part of the execution of the subroutine "Highways" set the task of bringing 85% of the road length Never-Yakutsk in 2018 up to standard, and by 2022 to complete the reconstruction of the entire road to Magadan. Thus, by 2022 over its entire length of the highway should have a major type of asphalt concrete coatings.

Currently it has successfully implemented sections of the federal target program for the reconstruction of the road, which is part of the international transport corridor linking the Auto-advance on the border of the Russian Federation and the People's Republic of China to the sea port in the city of Magadan.

Today, the reconstruction is being carried out on 228 kilometers of the road. From 2010 to 2014 inclusive, was put into operation more than 170 km of road, including being rebuilt with new traffic loads. The highway has 206 meters of bridges.

Today introduced road sections meet modern requirements both in bandwidth and in terms of road safety.

Since 2010 the amount and quality of work of the repair and maintenance of roads Never-Yakutsk was increased.

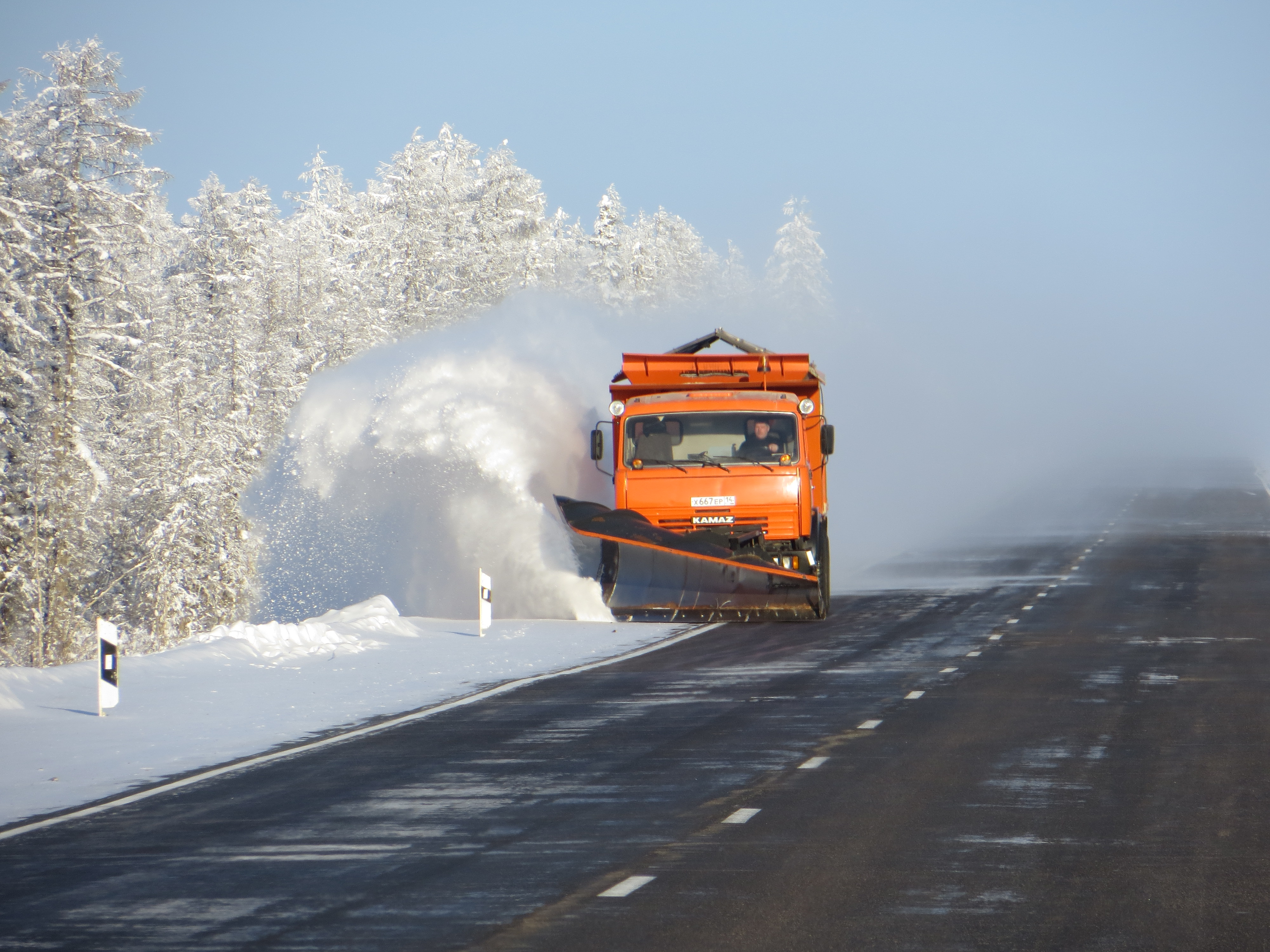
Plowing the road during winter

== Construction problems ==
The road mainly used to go through the territory of permafrost. Until 2014, only small areas near Tynda, Neryungri and Aldan were paved. There were areas where the pavement was completely absent, and the road during snowmelt (May - beginning of June) could become impassable. In 2006 Lena Highway was named one of the most dangerous roads in the world.

The main disadvantage is the current absence of a bridge over the Lena River. In summer a passenger ferry operates, while in the winter (December - April) access is possible via ice road. However, during the short spring and autumn, access is possible only by air or hovercraft.

== Bridge over Lena ==
There is no bridge over the Lena anywhere in Yakutia. One is meant to be built 40 kilometres (25 mi) south of Yakutsk center, of some 3 kilometres (1.9 mi) in length. In July 2013 the Federal Road Agency requested a tender to build a three-kilometer road-only bridge over the river, expecting a cost of $1.7 bn/56 bn RUB, and a 6-year construction period. The winner was planned to be announced in spring 2014. According to the plans of construction of the bridge across the Lena, it was to begin in 2014 and end in 2020, but it was postponed due to the perceived need of building a bridge across the Kerch Strait.

Construction of a road bridge over the River Lena to Yakutsk was approved by president Vladimir Putin on 9 Nov 2019. Cost of the 3.2 kilometres (2.0 mi) bridge and its 10.9 kilometres (6.8 mi) of approaches was estimated at 63.7 billion Rubles (83 billion rubles including VAT [НДС]), of which a grant of 54.2 billion Rubles was to be provided, with the remainder to be sourced from investors. The bridge is to be toll-free for cars, with a toll for trucks. The bridge began construction in 2024, and is planned to be complete in late 2028.
