= Petrovka, Sakha Republic =

Petrovka Петровка
- Selo
- Interactive map of Petrovka
- Location of Petrovka Petrovka (Sakha Republic)
- Coordinates: 61°43′N 130°16′E
- Country: Russia
- Federal subject: Sakha Republic
- Administrative district: Megino-Kangalassky District
- Rural okrugSelsoviet: Kharansky Rural Okrug
- Elevation: 148 m (486 ft)

Population (2010 Census)
  - Total: 1,139
  - Estimate (2021): 1,225 (+7.6%)

Administrative status
  - Capital of: Kharansky Rural Okrug

Municipal status
  - Municipal district: Megino-Kangalassky Municipal District
  - Rural settlement: Kharansky Rural Settlement
  - Capital of: Kharansky Rural Settlement
- Time zone: UTC+
- Postal code: 678070
- OKTMO ID: 98629462101

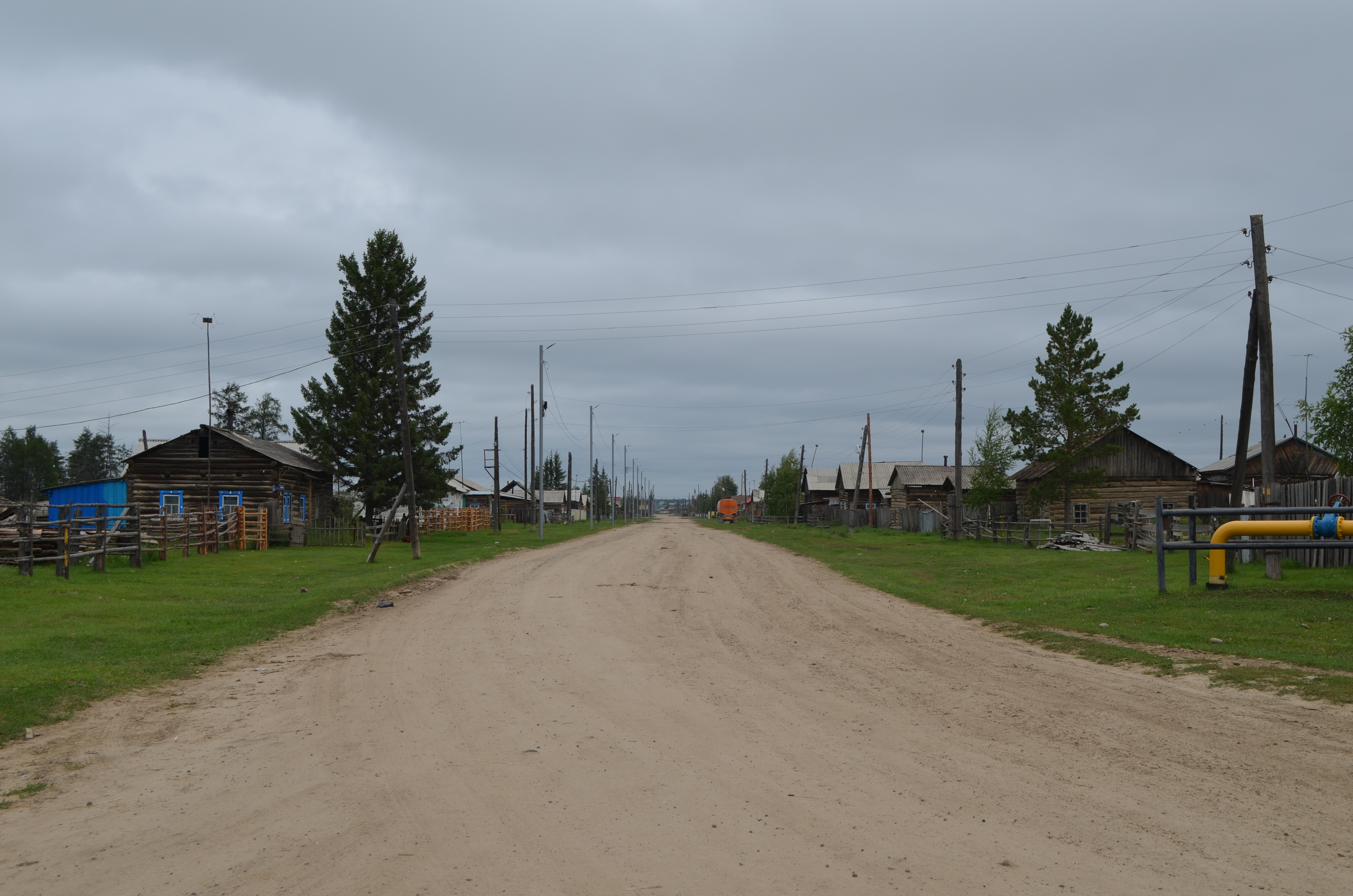
Petrovka

Petrovka (Russian: Петровка) is a rural locality (a selo), the only inhabited locality, and the administrative center of Kharansky Rural Okrug of Megino-Kangalassky District in the Sakha Republic, Russia, located 35 kilometers (22 mi) from Nizhny Bestyakh, the administrative center of the district. Its population as of the 2010 Census was 1,139, of whom 520 were male and 619 female, up from 1,068 as recorded during the 2002 Census.
