= Soto, Russia =

Soto Сото
- Selo
- Interactive map of Soto
- Location of Soto Soto (Sakha Republic)
- Coordinates: 61°48′N 130°31′E
- Country: Russia
- Federal subject: Sakha Republic
- Administrative district: Megino-Kangalassky District
- Rural okrugSelsoviet: Dogdoginsky Rural Okrug

Population (2010 Census)
  - Total: 3
  - Estimate (2021): 0 (−100%)

Municipal status
  - Municipal district: Megino-Kangalassky Municipal District
  - Rural settlement: Dogdoginsky Rural Settlement
- Time zone: UTC+
- Postal code: 678070
- OKTMO ID: 98629425106

Soto (Russian: Сото; Yakut: Сото) is a rural locality (a selo) in Dogdoginsky Rural Okrug of Megino-Kangalassky District in the Sakha Republic, Russia, located 16 kilometers (9.9 mi) from Mayya, the administrative center of the district, and 8 kilometers (5.0 mi) from Byokyo, the administrative center of the rural okrug. Its population as of the 2010 Census was 3; down from 28 recorded in the 2002 Census.
