= Khomustakh, Megino-Kangalassky District, Sakha Republic =

Khomustakh Хомустах
- Selo
- Interactive map of Khomustakh
- Location of Khomustakh Khomustakh (Sakha Republic)
- Coordinates: 61°50′N 129°51′E
- Country: Russia
- Federal subject: Sakha Republic
- Administrative district: Megino-Kangalassky District
- Rural okrugSelsoviet: Neryuktyayinsky Rural Okrug

Population
  - Estimate (2002): 34 )

Municipal status
  - Municipal district: Megino-Kangalassky Municipal District
  - Rural settlement: Neryuktyayinsky Rural Settlement
- Time zone: UTC+
- Postal code: 678082
- OKTMO ID: 98629445106

Khomustakh (Russian: Хомустах; Yakut: Хомустаах, Xomustaax) is a rural locality (a selo) in Neryuktyayinsky Rural Okrug of Megino-Kangalassky District in the Sakha Republic, Russia, located 31 kilometers (19 mi) from Nizhny Bestyakh, the administrative center of the district and 4 kilometers (2.5 mi) from Pavlovsk, the administrative center of the rural okrug. Its population as of the 2002 Census was 34.
