= Chyuyya =

Chyuyya Чюйя
- Selo
- Interactive map of Chyuyya
- Location of Chyuyya Chyuyya (Sakha Republic)
- Coordinates: 61°43′N 130°22′E
- Country: Russia
- Federal subject: Sakha Republic
- Administrative district: Megino-Kangalassky District
- Rural okrugSelsoviet: Khodorinsky Rural Okrug
- Elevation: 165 m (541 ft)

Population (2010 Census)
  - Total: 611
  - Estimate (2021): 642 (+5.1%)

Administrative status
  - Capital of: Khodorinsky Rural Okrug

Municipal status
  - Municipal district: Megino-Kangalassky Municipal District
  - Rural settlement: Khodorinsky Rural Settlement
  - Capital of: Khodorinsky Rural Settlement
- Time zone: UTC+
- Postal code: 678070
- OKTMO ID: 98629463101

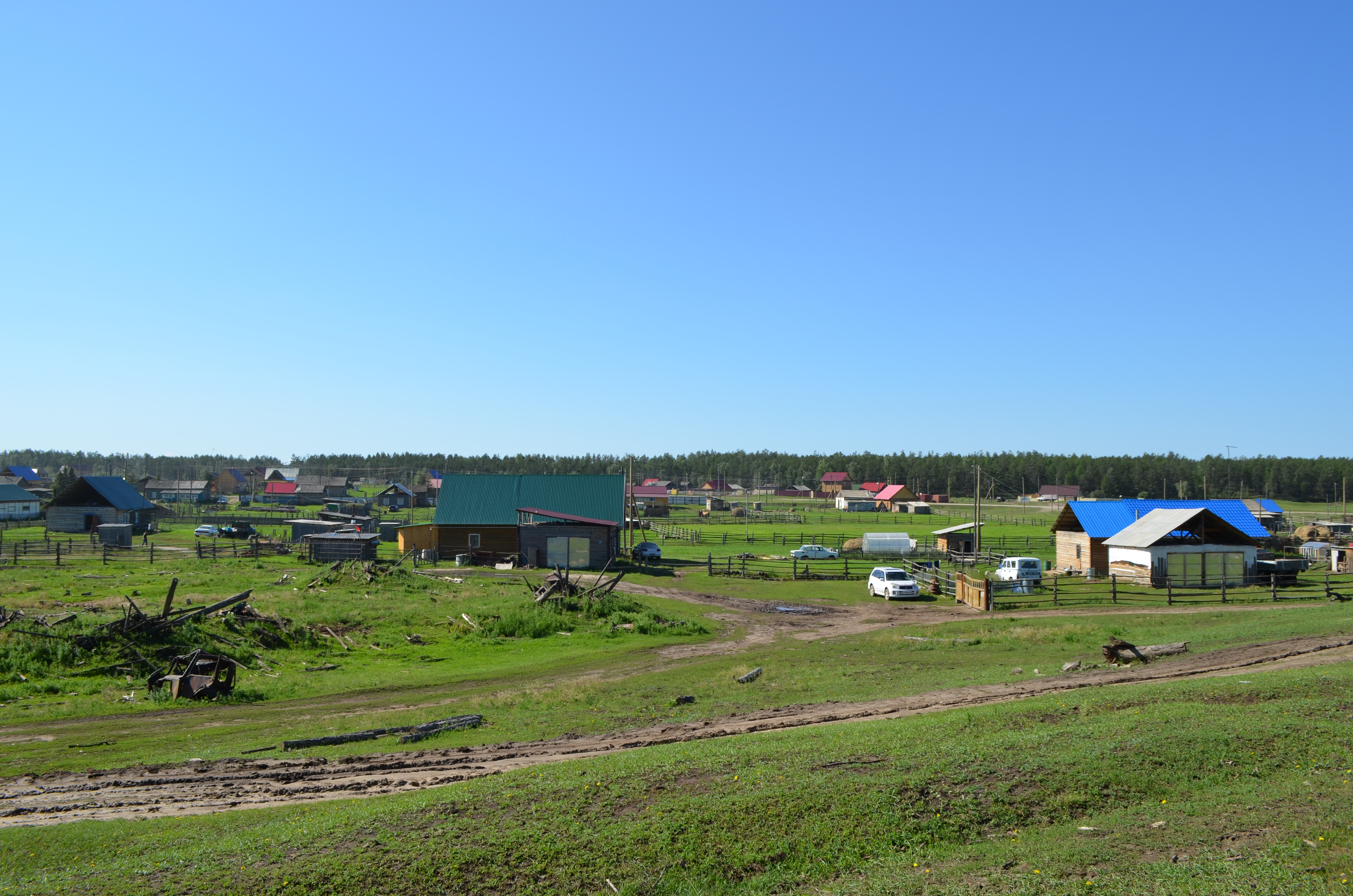
Chyuyya

Chyuyya (Russian: Чюйя; Yakut: Чүүйэ, Çüüye) is a rural locality (a selo), the only inhabited locality, and the administrative center of Khodorinsky Rural Okrug of Megino-Kangalassky District in the Sakha Republic, Russia, located 5 kilometers (3.1 mi) from Mayya, the administrative center of the district. Its population as of the 2010 Census was 611, up from 565 recorded during the 2002 Census.
