= Lena Bridge =

Bridge over the Lena River in Sakha Republic, Russia

Lena Bridge Ленский мост
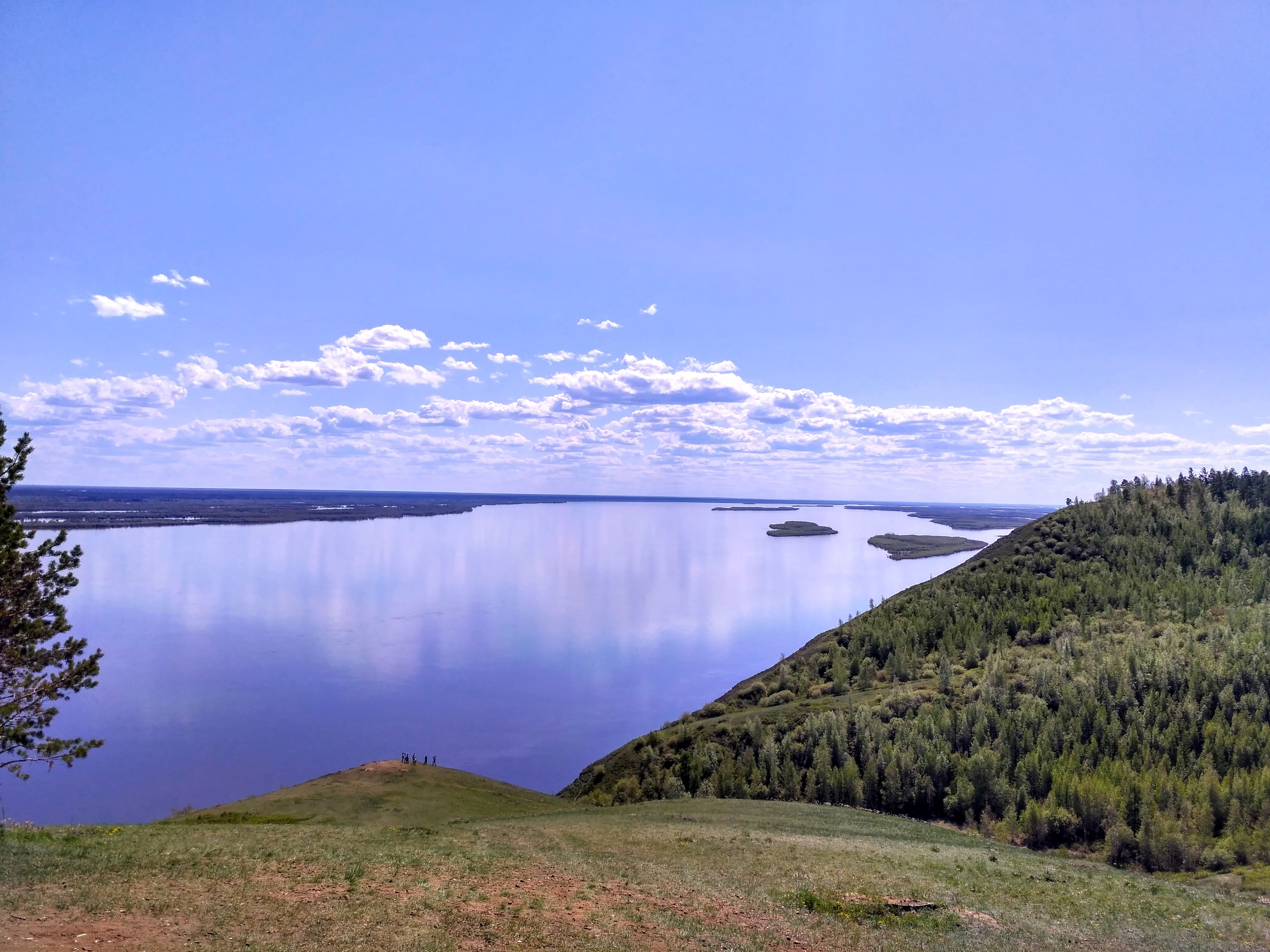
- Site of the future bridge
- Coordinates: 61°48′N 129°41′E
- Carries: 2 lanes connecting A360 Lena Highway to Umnas Road
- Crosses: Lena River
- Locale: Yakutsk
- Website: mostlena.ru

Characteristics
- Design: Cable-stayed bridge
- Total length: 4.61 km (2.9 mi)
- Width: 19.58 m (64 ft)
- Height: 284.5 m (933 ft)
- Longest span: 840 m (0.5 mi)
- Piers in water: 3

History
- Construction start: 2024
- Construction end: 2028 (expected)
- Construction cost: ₽133 billion (expected)

Location
- Interactive map of Lena Bridge

The Lena Bridge (Russian: Мост через р. Лену, lit. 'Bridge over the Lena River') is a cable-stayed bridge under construction in the Sakha Republic in Russia. The bridge will cross the Lena River, connecting the A331 highway to the Lena and Kolyma highways and linking the city of Yakutsk to the rest of the Russian road network. Upon completion, the bridge will establish a year-round road connection to Yakutsk and link the Russian Far East to the ports of the Sea of Okhotsk, developing Russia's northern economic axis.

== History ==
Currently, Yakutsk cannot be reached by road year-round. In the winter, there is an ice road over the Lena, and in summer ferries must be used. During parts of spring and fall, there is no reliable access by road or ferry due to moving ice, with residents forced to either choose more expensive privately operated hovercraft or icebreaker-assisted ferries, or cross the river on foot or by car over brittle ice.

The project to connect the banks of the Lena near Yakutia originated in 1980, following the construction of the Baikal-Amur Mainline. Since 1986, three options for the location of the bridge have been considered. Finally a location was chosen at a distance of 38 km upstream on the Lena from Yakutsk, near the town of Nizhny Bestyakh. This option was justified by the proximity to the Amur-Yakutsk Mainline, which connects Nizhny Bestyakh to Berkakit. Original plans for the bridge called for a combined road-rail bridge, but these plans were later shelved. A tunnel under the Lena was also proposed in 2010, but was later dismissed as being too expensive and technically infeasible. In 2012, Sakha’s then-President Yegor Borisov renewed calls for the construction of the Lena Bridge, promising to complete it by 2016.

In July 2013, the Federal Road Agency announced an open tender for a contract for the construction and operation of a road bridge on the Lena River in Yakutsk. The competition, officially announced on July 19, provided for the construction of a road bridge and its approaches of a total length greater than 21 kilometers. According to experts, the estimated cost of construction was no greater than 40 billion rubles. The winner of the concession was the consortium Transportnyje koncessii (Sakha). However, these plans were later shelved due to the prioritization of the construction of the Crimean Bridge following the Russian invasion and annexation of Crimea in 2014.

The project was restarted in 2019, with an estimated cost of 60-65 billion rubles and a projected completion date of 2024. In November 2023, Russian president Vladimir Putin declared that the construction of the bridge would be completed by 2028. The construction of the bridge began in October 2024, with drilling on the right bank of the Lena beginning in March 2025. With the first constructions, the estimated costs increased to around 130 billion rubles. The first piles to support the structure have been installed in the second quarter of 2025.

As of 2026, both the Sakha government and VIS Group, the private company responsible for constructing the bridge, are reportedly struggling to finance the project’s rising construction costs, with further progress expected to depend heavily on federal budget allocations.

== Design ==
Diagram of bridge

The bridge will cross the river from the village of Staraya Tabaga to the village of Khaptagai, approximately 40 kilometers upstream of Yakutsk, at a location where the Lena River narrows.

The design and construction of the Lena Bridge faces significant technical challenges due to the region’s extreme environmental conditions, including substantial temperature variations ranging from potentially −60 °C in winter to +40 °C in summer as well as associated fluctuations in atmospheric pressure and humidity.

The chosen design is a two-lane cable-stayed bridge with three pillars and two spans, each 840 meters in length. The central pillar will have a height of 284.5 meters, while the side pillars will have heights of 194.5 meters.

Passenger cars will be able to cross free of charge, but a toll will be established for trucks. With a single lane in each direction, the bridge is expected to handle around 5,000 vehicles per day.

== See also ==
- List of bridges in Russia
