= Khatylyma =

Khatylyma Хатылыма
- Selo
- Interactive map of Khatylyma
- Location of Khatylyma Khatylyma (Sakha Republic)
- Coordinates: 61°33′N 129°53′E
- Country: Russia
- Federal subject: Sakha Republic
- Administrative district: Megino-Kangalassky District
- Rural okrugSelsoviet: Tyllyminsky 2-y Rural Okrug
- Elevation: 145 m (476 ft)

Population (2010 Census)
  - Total: 118
  - Estimate (2021): 120 (+1.7%)

Administrative status
  - Capital of: Tyllyminsky 2-y Rural Okrug

Municipal status
  - Municipal district: Megino-Kangalassky Municipal District
  - Rural settlement: Tyllyminsky 2-y Rural Settlement
  - Capital of: Tyllyminsky 2-y Rural Settlement
- Time zone: UTC+
- Postal code: 678084
- OKTMO ID: 98629452101

Khatylyma (Russian: Хатылыма; Yakut: Хаатылыма, Xaatılıma) is a rural locality (a selo), the only inhabited locality, and the administrative center of Tyllyminsky 2-y Rural Okrug of Megino-Kangalassky District in the Sakha Republic, Russia, located 34 kilometers (21 mi) from Mayya, the administrative center of the district. Its population as of the 2010 Census was 118, down from 142 recorded during the 2002 Census.
