= Tarat, Russia =

Tarat Тарат
- Selo
- Interactive map of Tarat
- Location of Tarat Tarat (Sakha Republic)
- Coordinates: 62°13′N 130°37′E
- Country: Russia
- Federal subject: Sakha Republic
- Administrative district: Megino-Kangalassky District
- Rural okrugSelsoviet: Arangassky Rural Okrug

Population (2010 Census)
  - Total: 353
  - Estimate (2021): 354 (+0.3%)

Administrative status
  - Capital of: Arangassky Rural Okrug

Municipal status
  - Municipal district: Megino-Kangalassky Municipal District
  - Rural settlement: Arangassky Rural Settlement
  - Capital of: Arangassky Rural Settlement
- Time zone: UTC+
- Postal code: 678075
- OKTMO ID: 98629403101

Tarat (Russian: Тарат; Yakut: Тарат) is a rural locality (a selo), the only inhabited locality, and the administrative center of Arangassky Rural Okrug of Megino-Kangalassky District in the Sakha Republic, Russia, located 69 kilometers (43 mi) from Nizhny Bestyakh, the administrative center of the district. Its population as of the 2010 Census was 353, of whom 183 were male and 170 female, down from 381 as recorded during the 2002 Census.
