= Bedzhelek =

Bedzhelek Беджелек
- Selo
- Interactive map of Bedzhelek
- Location of Bedzhelek Bedzhelek (Sakha Republic)
- Coordinates: 61°57′N 130°12′E
- Country: Russia
- Federal subject: Sakha Republic
- Administrative district: Megino-Kangalassky District
- Rural okrugSelsoviet: Zhankhadinsky Rural Okrug

Population
  - Estimate (2002): 0 )

Municipal status
  - Municipal district: Megino-Kangalassky Municipal District
  - Rural settlement: Zhankhadinsky Rural Settlement
- Time zone: UTC+
- Postal code: 678081
- OKTMO ID: 98629410106

Bedzhelek (Russian: Беджелек; Yakut: Бөдьөлөк, Böcölök) is a rural locality (a selo) in Zhankhadinsky Rural Okrug of Megino-Kangalassky District in the Sakha Republic, Russia, located 27 kilometers (17 mi) from Nizhny Bestyakh, the administrative center of the district and 32 kilometers (20 mi) from Tyokhtyur, the administrative center of the rural okrug. Its population as of the 2002 Census was 0.
