= Byokyo =

Byokyo Бёкё
- Selo
- Interactive map of Byokyo
- Location of Byokyo Byokyo (Sakha Republic)
- Coordinates: 61°47′N 130°27′E
- Country: Russia
- Federal subject: Sakha Republic
- Administrative district: Megino-Kangalassky District
- Rural okrugSelsoviet: Dogdoginsky Rural Okrug
- Elevation: 144 m (472 ft)

Population
  - Estimate (2002): 352 )

Administrative status
  - Capital of: Dogdoginsky Rural Okrug

Municipal status
  - Municipal district: Megino-Kangalassky Municipal District
  - Rural settlement: Dogdoginsky Rural Settlement
  - Capital of: Dogdoginsky Rural Settlement
- Time zone: UTC+
- Postal code: 678070
- OKTMO ID: 98629425101

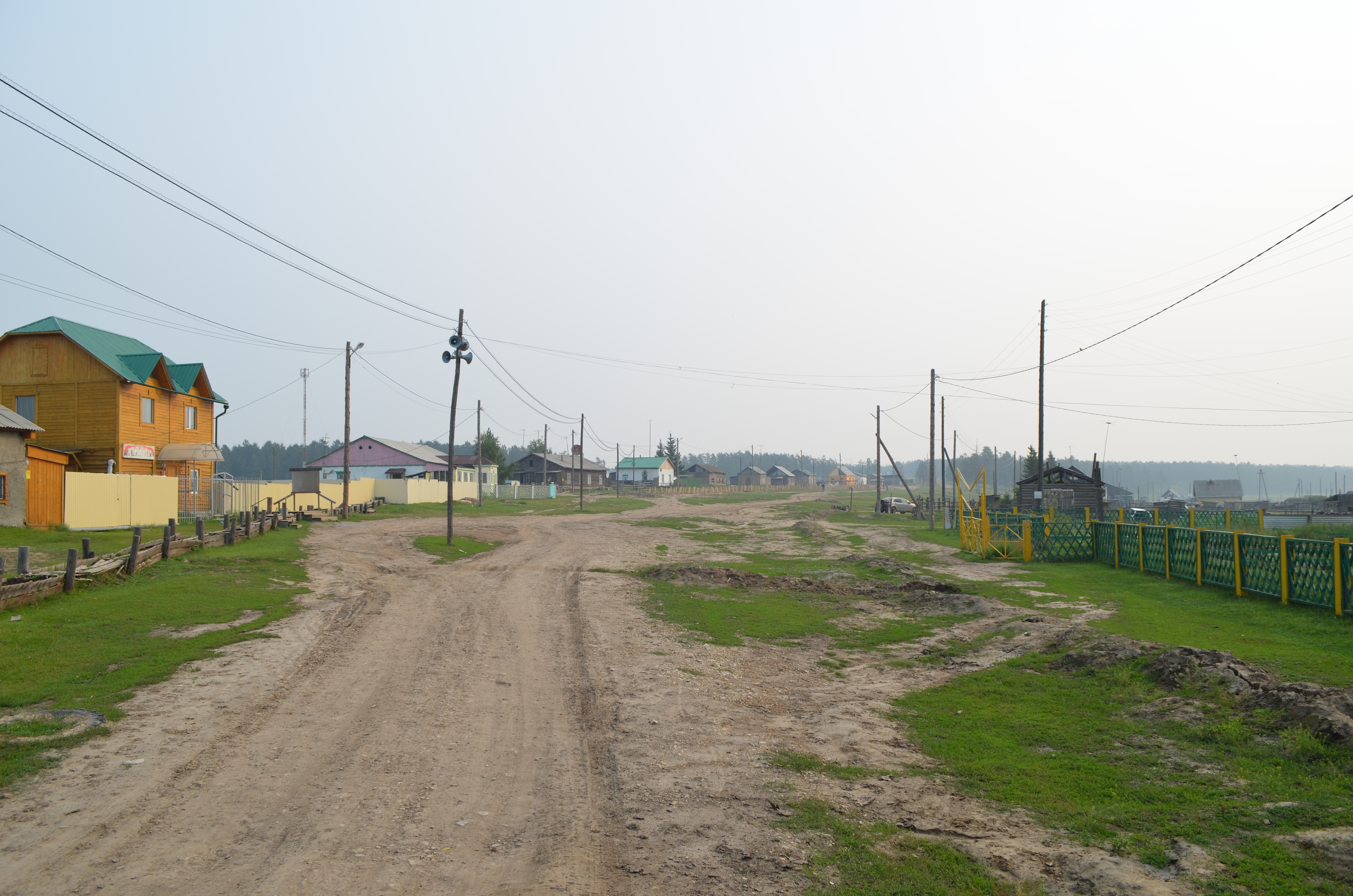
Byokyo

Byokyo (Russian: Бёкё; Yakut: Бөкө, Bökö) is a rural locality (a selo), the administrative centre of and one of two settlements, in addition to Soto, in Dogdoginsky Rural Okrug of Megino-Kangalassky District in the Sakha Republic, Russia. It is located 8 kilometers (5.0 mi) from Nizhny Bestyakh, the administrative center of the district. Its population as of the 2002 Census was 352.
