= Yelechey =

Yelechey Елечей
- Selo
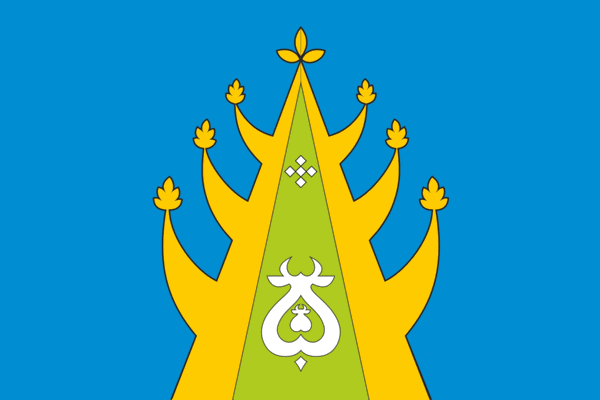
- Flag
- Interactive map of Yelechey
- Location of Yelechey Yelechey (Sakha Republic)
- Coordinates: 61°42′N 131°16′E
- Country: Russia
- Federal subject: Sakha Republic
- Administrative district: Megino-Kangalassky District
- Rural okrugSelsoviet: Altansky Rural Okrug

Population (2010 Census)
  - Total: 502
  - Estimate (2021): 470 (−6.4%)

Administrative status
  - Capital of: Altansky Rural Okrug

Municipal status
  - Municipal district: Megino-Kangalassky Municipal District
  - Rural settlement: Altansky Rural Settlement
  - Capital of: Altansky Rural Settlement
- Time zone: UTC+
- Postal code: 678074
- OKTMO ID: 98629402101

Yelechey (Russian: Елечей; Yakut: Өлөчөй, Ölöçöy) is a rural locality (a selo), the only inhabited locality, and the administrative center of Altansky Rural Okrug of Megino-Kangalassky District in the Sakha Republic, Russia, located 64 kilometers (40 mi) from Mayya, the administrative center of the district. Its population as of the 2010 Census was 502, up from 489 recorded during the 2002 Census.
