= Teligi, Russia =

Teligi Телиги
- Selo
- Interactive map of Teligi
- Location of Teligi Teligi (Sakha Republic)
- Coordinates: 61°22′N 130°41′E
- Country: Russia
- Federal subject: Sakha Republic
- Administrative district: Megino-Kangalassky District
- Rural okrugSelsoviet: Nakharinsky 1-y Rural Okrug

Population (2010 Census)
  - Total: 534
  - Estimate (2021): 505 (−5.4%)

Administrative status
  - Capital of: Nakharinsky 1-y Rural Okrug

Municipal status
  - Municipal district: Megino-Kangalassky Municipal District
  - Rural settlement: Nakharinsky 1-y Rural Settlement
  - Capital of: Nakharinsky 1-y Rural Settlement
- Time zone: UTC+
- Postal code: 678089
- OKTMO ID: 98629449101

Teligi (Russian: Телиги; Yakut: Тиэлиги, Tieligi) is a rural locality (a selo), the only inhabited locality, and the administrative center of Nakharinsky 1-y Rural Okrug of Megino-Kangalassky District in the Sakha Republic, Russia, located 69 kilometers (43 mi) from Nizhny Bestyakh, the administrative center of the district. Its population as of the 2010 Census was 534, of whom 251 were male and 283 female, down from 585 as recorded during the 2002 Census.
