= Suullar Myraan =

Mountains in Sakha Republic, Russia

- Сууллар Мыраан
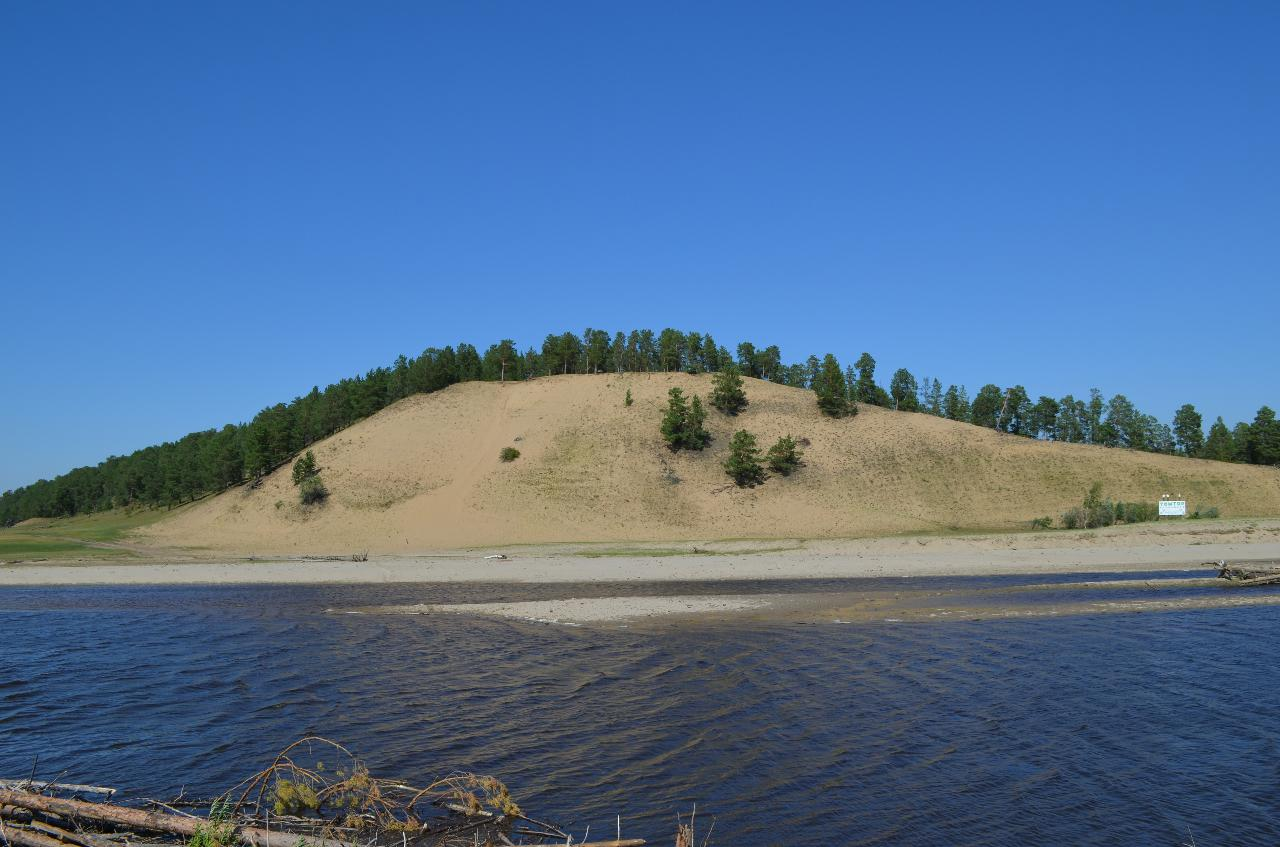
- The Suola River and Suular Myraan near the village of Tyokhtyur

Highest point
- Elevation: 81 m (266 ft)
- Coordinates: 61°42′N 129°27′E

Geography
- Location within Sakha Republic
- Location: Sakha Republic, Russia

Climbing
- Easiest route: From Tyokhtyur or Tomtor

Suullar Myraan (Yakut: Сууллар Мыраан, romanized: Suullar Mıraan) is a hill in Megino-Kangalassky Ulus, in the Sakha Republic, Russia. It is a long sand hill located by the Suola River, a right hand tributary of the Lena River.

The hill stands out in the surrounding flat landscape. Its name means "leaning mountain" in the Yakut language. Suullar Myraan rises by the banks of the Suola river 0.4 kilometres (0.25 mi) from Tyokhtyur village and 4 kilometres (2.5 mi) from Tomtor.

== History ==
There were conflicts in the past between Tyokhtyur and Tomtor villages regarding possession of Suullar Myraan.

An almost complete skeleton of a woolly mammoth (Mammuthus primigenius) was found in 2015 at the foot of the hill. Analysis of spore-pollen from rock samples of the site indicated that the climate of the area at the time that the mammoth lived was warmer than in present-day times.
