= Byrama =

Byrama Бырама
- Selo
- Interactive map of Byrama
- Location of Byrama Byrama (Sakha Republic)
- Coordinates: 61°28′N 130°57′E
- Country: Russia
- Federal subject: Sakha Republic
- Administrative district: Megino-Kangalassky District
- Rural okrugSelsoviet: Kholguminsky Rural Okrug

Population (2010 Census)
  - Total: 294
  - Estimate (2021): 286 (−2.7%)

Administrative status
  - Capital of: Kholguminsky Rural Okrug

Municipal status
  - Municipal district: Megino-Kangalassky Municipal District
  - Rural settlement: Kholguminsky Rural Settlement
  - Capital of: Kholguminsky Rural Settlement
- Time zone: UTC+
- Postal code: 678093
- OKTMO ID: 98629464101

Byrama (Russian: Бырама; Yakut: Бырама, Bırama) is a rural locality (a selo), the only inhabited locality, and the administrative center of Kholguminsky Rural Okrug of Megino-Kangalassky District in the Sakha Republic, Russia, located 63 kilometers (39 mi) from Mayya, the administrative center of the district. Its population as of the 2010 Census was 294; down from 347 recorded in the 2002 Census.
