= Tyungyulyu =

Tyungyulyu Тюнгюлю
- Selo
- Interactive map of Tyungyulyu
- Location of Tyungyulyu Tyungyulyu (Sakha Republic)
- Coordinates: 62°11′N 130°42′E
- Country: Russia
- Federal subject: Sakha Republic
- Administrative district: Megino-Kangalassky District
- Rural okrugSelsoviet: Tyungyulyunsky Rural Okrug
- Founded: 1930

Population (2010 Census)
  - Total: 2,308
  - Estimate (2021): 2,163 (−6.3%)

Administrative status
  - Capital of: Tyungyulyunsky Rural Okrug

Municipal status
  - Municipal district: Megino-Kangalassky Municipal District
  - Rural settlement: Tyungyulyunsky Rural Settlement
  - Capital of: Tyungyulyunsky Rural Settlement
- Time zone: UTC+
- Postal code: 678075
- OKTMO ID: 98629455101

Tyungyulyu (Russian: Тюнгюлю; Yakut: Төҥүлү, Töŋülü) is a rural locality (a selo), the only inhabited locality, and the administrative center of Tyungyulyunsky Rural Okrug of Megino-Kangalassky District in the Sakha Republic, Russia, located 64 kilometers (40 mi) from Nizhny Bestyakh, the administrative center of the district. Its population as of the 2010 Census was 2,308, of whom 1,129 were male and 1,179 female, up from 2,280 as recorded during the 2002 Census.
