= Tyokhtyur, Megino-Kangalassky District, Sakha Republic =

Tyokhtyur Тектюр
- Selo
- Interactive map of Tyokhtyur
- Location of Tyokhtyur Tyokhtyur (Sakha Republic)
- Coordinates: 62°06′N 130°02′E
- Country: Russia
- Federal subject: Sakha Republic
- Administrative district: Megino-Kangalassky District
- Rural okrugSelsoviet: Zhankhadinsky Rural Okrug
- Founded: 1710
- Elevation: 117 m (384 ft)

Population
  - Estimate (2002): 1,269 )

Administrative status
  - Capital of: Zhankhadinsky Rural Okrug

Municipal status
  - Municipal district: Megino-Kangalassky Municipal District
  - Rural settlement: Zhankhadinsky Rural Settlement
  - Capital of: Zhankhadinsky Rural Settlement
- Time zone: UTC+
- Postal code: 678081
- OKTMO ID: 98629410101

Tyokhtyur (Russian: Тёхтюр; Yakut: Төхтүр, Töxtür) is a rural locality (a selo), the administrative centre of and one of two settlements, in addition to Bedzhelek, in Zhankhadinsky Rural Okrug of Megino-Kangalassky District in the Sakha Republic, Russia. It is located 59 kilometers (37 mi) from Nizhny Bestyakh, the administrative center of the district. Its population as of the 2002 Census was 1,269.
