= Tomtor, Megino-Kangalassky District, Sakha Republic =

Tomtor Томтор
- Selo
- Interactive map of Tomtor
- Location of Tomtor Tomtor (Sakha Republic)
- Coordinates: 62°09′N 130°09′E
- Country: Russia
- Federal subject: Sakha Republic
- Administrative district: Megino-Kangalassky District
- Rural okrugSelsoviet: Tomtorsky Rural Okrug

Population (2010 Census)
  - Total: 430
  - Estimate (2021): 425 (−1.2%)

Administrative status
  - Capital of: Tomtorsky Rural Okrug

Municipal status
  - Municipal district: Megino-Kangalassky Municipal District
  - Rural settlement: Tomtorsky Rural Settlement
  - Capital of: Tomtorsky Rural Settlement
- Time zone: UTC+
- Postal code: 678081
- OKTMO ID: 98629451101

Tomtor (Russian: Томтор; Yakut: Томтор) is a rural locality (a selo), the only inhabited locality, and the administrative center of Tomtorsky Rural Okrug of Megino-Kangalassky District in the Sakha Republic, Russia, located 30 kilometers (19 mi) from Nizhny Bestyakh, the administrative center of the district. Its population as of the 2010 Census was 430, of whom 204 were male and 226 female, down from 452 as recorded during the 2002 Census.

It is one of the centers of population located in the Suola River basin.
