= Khaptagay =

Khaptagay Хаптагай
- Selo

Other transcription(s)
  - Sakha: Хаптаҕай
- Interactive map of Khaptagay
- Location of Khaptagay Khaptagay (Sakha Republic)
- Coordinates: 61°47′N 129°47′E
- Country: Russia
- Federal subject: Sakha Republic
- Administrative district: Megino-Kangalassky District
- Rural okrugSelsoviet: Khaptagaysky Rural Okrug

Population (2010 Census)
  - Total: 1,004
  - Estimate (2021): 1,047 (+4.3%)

Administrative status
  - Capital of: Khaptagaysky Rural Okrug

Municipal status
  - Municipal district: Megino-Kangalassky Municipal District
  - Rural settlement: Khaptagaysky Rural Settlement
  - Capital of: Khaptagaysky Rural Settlement
- Time zone: UTC+
- Postal code: 678083
- OKTMO ID: 98629460101

Khaptagay (Russian: Хаптагай; Yakut: Хаптаҕай, Xaptağay, lit. flat) is a rural locality (a selo), the only inhabited locality, and the administrative center of Khaptagaysky Rural Okrug of Megino-Kangalassky District in the Sakha Republic, Russia, located 36 kilometers (22 mi) from Mayya, the administrative center of the district, at the confluence of the Myla and Lena Rivers, near the mouth of the Tamma in the Lena, on the Amur–Yakutsk Mainline. Its population as of the 2010 Census was 1,004; down from 1,014 recorded in the 2002 Census.

== Economy ==
The Tamginsky Ironworks operated in this area in 1735–1756. Nowadays, Khaptagay is an agricultural center, with the main aspects being cattle and horse breeding.
