= Karapatskoye =

Karapatskoye Карапатское
- Selo
- Interactive map of Karapatskoye
- Location of Karapatskoye Karapatskoye (Sakha Republic)
- Coordinates: 61°42′N 129°28′E
- Country: Russia
- Federal subject: Sakha Republic
- Administrative district: Khangalassky District
- Rural okrugSelsoviet: Tyoktyursky Rural Okrug

Population
  - Estimate (2002): 4 )

Municipal status
  - Municipal district: Khangalassky Municipal District
  - Rural settlement: Tyoktyursky Rural Settlement
- Time zone: UTC+
- Postal code: 678006
- OKTMO ID: 98644447106

Karapatskoye (Russian: Карапатское) is a rural locality (a selo) in Tyoktyursky Rural Okrug of Khangalassky District in the Sakha Republic, Russia, located 37 kilometers (23 mi) from Pokrovsk, the administrative center of the district and 3 kilometers (1.9 mi) from Tyokhtyur, the administrative center of the rural okrug. Its population as of the 2002 Census was 4.
