= Suola, Moruksky Rural Okrug, Megino-Kangalassky District, Sakha Republic =

Suola Суола
- Selo
- Interactive map of Suola
- Location of Suola Suola (Sakha Republic)
- Coordinates: 61°43′N 131°06′E
- Country: Russia
- Federal subject: Sakha Republic
- Administrative district: Megino-Kangalassky District
- Rural okrugSelsoviet: Moruksky Rural Okrug

Population (2010 Census)
  - Total: 426
  - Estimate (2021): 435 (+2.1%)

Administrative status
  - Capital of: Moruksky Rural Okrug

Municipal status
  - Municipal district: Megino-Kangalassky Municipal District
  - Rural settlement: Moruksky Rural Settlement
  - Capital of: Moruksky Rural Settlement
- Time zone: UTC+
- Postal code: 678077
- OKTMO ID: 98629436101

Suola (Russian: Суола; Yakut: Суола) is a rural locality (a selo), the only inhabited locality, and the administrative center of Moruksky Rural Okrug of Megino-Kangalassky District in the Sakha Republic, Russia, located 50 kilometers (31 mi) from Nizhny Bestyakh, the administrative center of the district. Its population as of the 2010 Census was 426, of whom 216 were male and 210 female, down from 514 as recorded during the 2002 Census.

It is one of the centers of population located in the Suola River basin.
