= Solovyovsk =

Solovyovsk Соловьёвск
- Selo
- Location within Amur Oblast Location within Russia
- Coordinates: 54°13′N 124°25′E
- Country: Russia
- Region: Amur Oblast
- District: Tyndinsky District
- Time zone: UTC+9:00

Solovyovsk (Russian: Соловьёвск) is a rural locality (a selo) and the administrative center of Solovyovsky Selsoviet of Tyndinsky District, Amur Oblast, Russia. The population was 2,731 as of 2018. There are 43 streets.

== Geography ==
Solovyovsk is located 128 km south of Tynda (the district's administrative centre) by road. Never is the nearest rural locality.
