= Tyokhtyur, Khangalassky District, Sakha Republic =

Tyokhtyur Тёхтюр
- Selo
- Interactive map of Tyokhtyur
- Location of Tyokhtyur Tyokhtyur (Sakha Republic)
- Coordinates: 61°42′50″N 129°27′40″E
- Country: Russia
- Federal subject: Sakha Republic
- Administrative district: Khangalassky District
- Rural okrugSelsoviet: Tyoktyursky Rural Okrug
- Founded: 1862
- Elevation: 95 m (312 ft)

Population
  - Estimate (2002): 703 )

Administrative status
  - Capital of: Tyoktyursky Rural Okrug

Municipal status
  - Municipal district: Khangalassky Municipal District
  - Rural settlement: Tyoktyursky Rural Settlement
  - Capital of: Tyoktyursky Rural Settlement
- Time zone: UTC+
- Postal code: 678011
- OKTMO ID: 98644447101

Tyokhtyur (Russian: Тёхтюр; Yakut: Төхтүр, Töxtür) is a rural locality (a selo), the administrative centre of and one of two settlements, in addition to Karapatskoye, in Tyokhtyursky Rural Okrug of Khangalassky District in the Sakha Republic, Russia. It is located 47 kilometers (29 mi) from Pokrovsk, the administrative center of the district. Its population as of the 2002 Census was 703.

The famous Mount Suullar Myraan is located in the selo, by the Suola River valley.
