= Megino-Kangalassky District =

Megino-Kangalassky District Мегино-Кангаласский улус (Russian)
- District

Other transcription(s)
  - Yakut: Мэҥэ-Хаҥалас улууһа
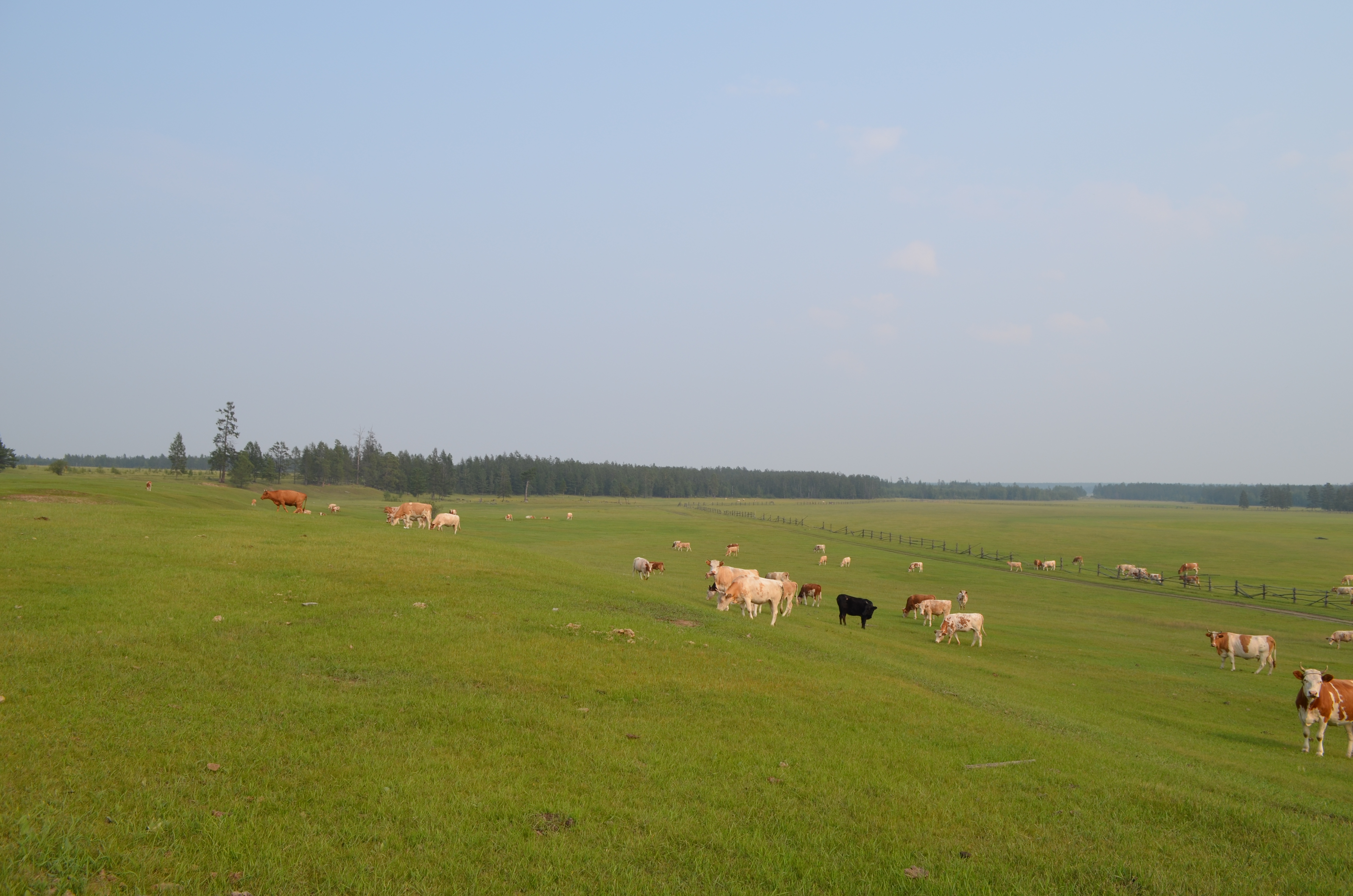
- Grazing livestock near the selo of Mayya in Megino-Kangalassky District

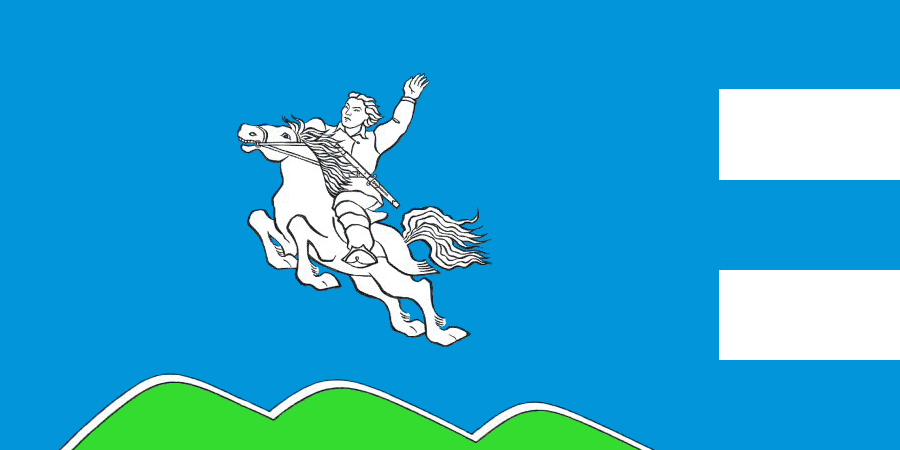
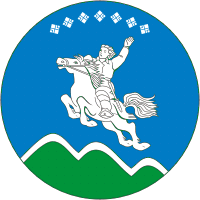
- Flag Coat of arms
- Location of Megino-Kangalassky District in the Sakha Republic
- Coordinates: 61°58′N 129°55′E
- Country: Russia
- Federal subject: Sakha Republic
- Established: February 10, 1930
- Administrative center: Mayya

Area
  - Total: 11,700 km^{2} (4,500 sq mi)

Population (2010 Census)
  - Total: 31,278
  - Density: 2.67/km^{2} (6.92/sq mi)
  - Urban: 11.2%
  - Rural: 88.8%

Administrative structure
  - Administrative divisions: 1 Settlements, 29 Rural okrugs
  - Inhabited localities: 1 urban-type settlements, 35 rural localities

Municipal structure
  - Municipally incorporated as: Megino-Kangalassky Municipal District
  - Municipal divisions: 1 urban settlements, 30 rural settlements
- Time zone: UTC+
- OKTMO ID: 98629000
- Website: https://mr-megino-kangalasskij.sakha.gov.ru

Megino-Kangalassky District (Russian: Ме́гино-Кангала́сский улу́с; Yakut: Мэҥэ-Хаҥалас улууһа, Meŋe Xaŋalas uluuha, [meŋe xaŋalas uluːha]) is an administrative and municipal district (raion, or ulus), one of the thirty-four in the Sakha Republic, Russia. It is located in the central part of the republic, on the Lena River opposite Yakutsk, the capital of the republic. The area of the district is 11,700 square kilometers (4,500 sq mi). Its administrative center is the rural locality (a selo) of Mayya. As of the 2010 Census, the total population of the district was 31,278, with the population of Mayya accounting for 23.3% of that number.

Historical population
Year	Pop.	±%
1970	25,210	—
1979	27,636	+9.6%
1989	31,623	+14.4%
2002	32,288	+2.1%
2010	31,278	−3.1%
2021	33,298	+6.5%
Source: Census data

== Geography ==
The district borders Ust-Aldansky District in the north, Churapchinsky District in the east, Amginsky District in the southeast, Khangalassky District in the southwest, and is bounded by the Lena River in the west. The main rivers are the Tamma, Myla and Suola. The famous Mount Suullar Myraan is located in the district, by the Suola River bank.

== History ==
The district was established on February 10, 1930 through the merger of Meginsky and Vostochno-Kangalassky Districts.

== Administrative and municipal status ==
Within the framework of administrative divisions, Megino-Kangalassky District is one of the thirty-four in the republic. It is divided into one settlement (an administrative division with the administrative center in the urban-type settlement (inhabited locality) of Nizhny Bestyakh) and twenty-nine rural okrugs (naslegs), all of which comprise thirty-five rural localities. The selo of Mayya serves as its administrative center.

As a municipal division, the district is incorporated as Megino-Kangalassky Municipal District. The Settlement of Nizhny Bestyakh is incorporated into an urban settlement, and the twenty-nine rural okrugs are incorporated into thirty rural settlements within the municipal district. The urban-type settlement of Nizhny Bestyakh serves as the administrative center of the municipal district.

=== Inhabited localities ===
Administrative/municipal composition
Settlements/Urban settlements	Population	Inhabited localities in jurisdiction
Nizhny Bestyakh (Нижний Бестях)	3,518	**urban-type settlement of Nizhny Bestyakh** (administrative center of the municipal district)
Rural okrugs/Rural settlements	Population	Rural localities in administrative jurisdiction*
Altansky (Алтанский)	502	**selo of Yelechey**
Arangassky (Арангасский)	353	**selo of Tarat**
Batarinsky (Батаринский)	502	**selo of Symakh**
Bedeminsky (Бедеминский)	541	**selo of Bedemyo**
Byuteydyakhsky (Бютейдяхский)	703	**selo of Byuteydyakh**
Dogdoginsky (Догдогинский)	364	**selo of Byokyo**; selo of Soto
Doydunsky (Дойдунский)	132	**selo of Khapchagay**
Dollunsky (Доллунский)	578	**selo of Tumul**
Zhabylsky (Жабыльский)	718	**selo of Nuoragana**
Zhankhadinsky (Жанхадинский)	1,185	**selo of Tyoktyur**; selo of Bedzhelek
Meginsky (Мегинский)	883	**selo of Balyktakh**
Megyuryonsky (Мегюрёнский)	497	**selo of Matta**; selo of Kerdyugen (municipally, a part of Doydunsky Rural Settlement)
Meldekhsinsky (Мелдехсинский)	505	**selo of Suola**
Moruksky (Морукский)	426	**selo of Suola**
Nakharinsky 1-y (Нахаринский 1-й)	534	**selo of Teligi**
Nakharinsky 2-y (Нахаринский 2-й)	622	**selo of Khocho**
Neryuktyayinsky (Нерюктяйинский)	2,022	**selo of Pavlovsk**; selo of Khomustakh
Rassolodinsky (Рассолодинский)	472	**selo of Rassoloda**
Taragaysky (Тарагайский)	892	**selo of Tabaga**
Tomtorsky (Томторский)	430	**selo of Tomtor**
Tyllyminsky 1-y (Тыллыминский 1-й)	701	**selo of Lomtuka**
Tyllyminsky 2-y (Тыллыминский 2-й)	118	**selo of Khatylyma**
Tyungyulyunsky (Тюнгюлюнский)	2,308	**selo of Tyungyulyu**
Khaptagaysky (Хаптагайский)	1,004	**selo of Khaptagay**
Kharansky (Харанский)	1,139	**selo of Petrovka**
Khodorinsky (Ходоринский)	611	**selo of Chyuyya**
Kholguminsky (Холгуминский)	295	**selo of Byrama**
Khorobutsky (Хоробутский)	1,002	**selo of Khorobut**; selo of Kharba-Atakh
Chyamayykinsky (Чыамайыкинский)	434	**selo of Darkylakh**
Rural localities which are not a part of a settlement or a rural okrug	Population	Rural localities
	7,288	**selo of Mayya** (administrative center of the administrative district) (municipally, a part of Mayya Rural Settlement)

*Administrative centers are shown in bold

== Demographics ==
As of the 2021 Census, the ethnic composition was as follows:

- Yakuts: 91.4%
- Russians: 4.8%
- Evenks: 0.8%
- Uzbeks: 0.5%
- others: 2.5%

== See also ==
- Lena Plateau
