= Tamma (river) =

River in Yakutia (Sakha Republic), Russia

Tamma Тамма
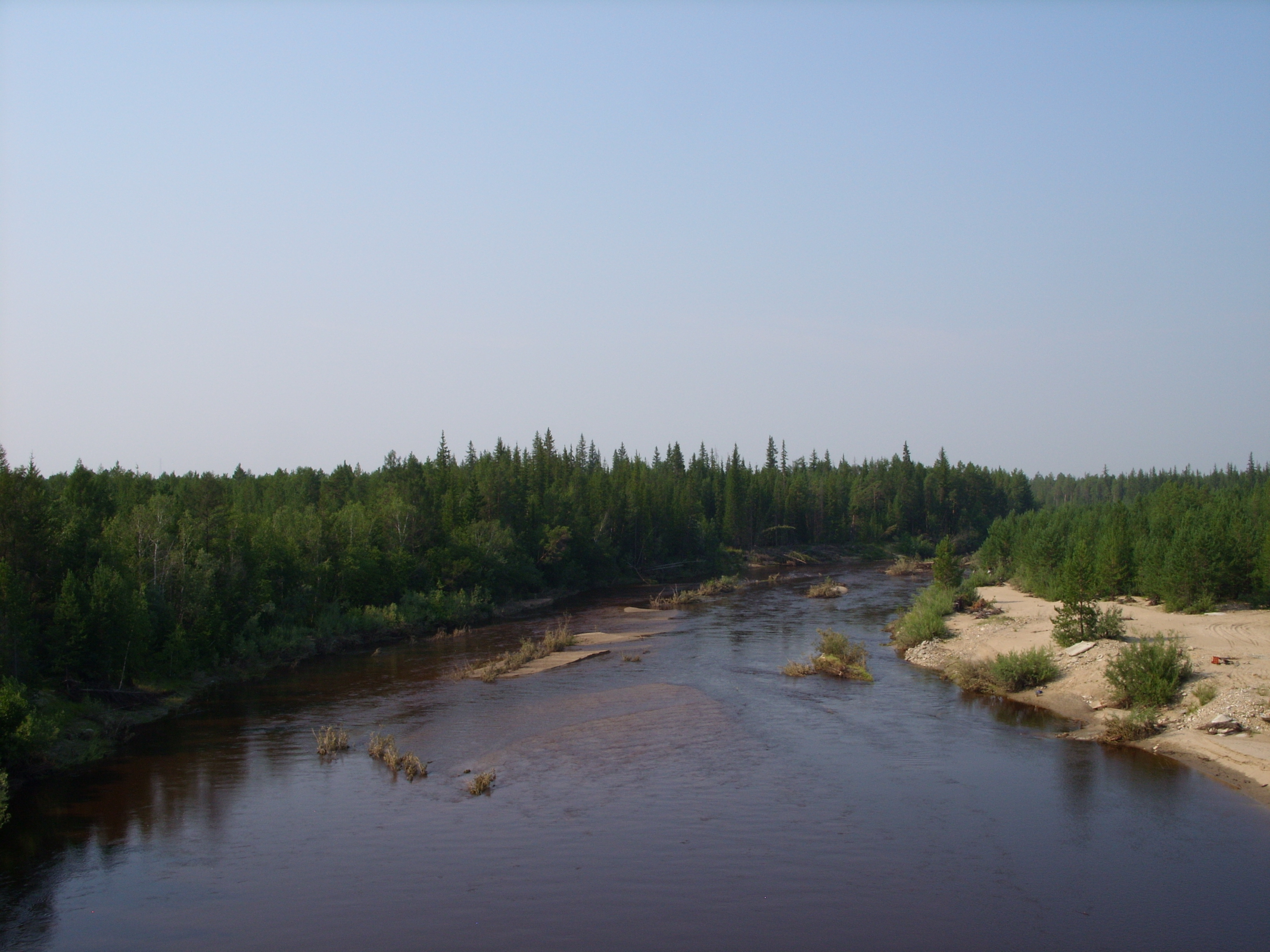
- View of the river

- Mouth location in Yakutia, Russia

Location
- Country: Russia

Physical characteristics
- Source
  - location: Sellyakait-Sella Ridge; Lena Plateau
  - coordinates: 60°48′25″N 130°25′35″E
- Mouth: Lena
  - coordinates: 61°47′03″N 129°44′20″E
- Length: 216 km (134 mi)
- Basin size: 4,430 km^{2} (1,710 sq mi)

Basin features
- Progression: Lena→ Laptev Sea

The Tamma (Russian: Тамма; Yakut: Тамма) is a river in Yakutia (Sakha Republic), Russia. It is a tributary of the Lena with a length of 216 kilometres (134 mi) and a drainage basin area of 4,430 square kilometres (1,710 mi^{2}).

The Tamma is the largest river of Megino-Kangalassky District. The villages of Darkylakh and Khaptagay are located by the river.

== Course ==
The Tamma is a right tributary of the Lena. It is formed on the Sellyakait-Sella Ridge (Кряж Селлякаит-Селля), at the confluence of the Konyo-Daban and Ilin-Daban rivers in the Lena Plateau, between the Lena and the Amga. It heads in a roughly northwestern direction parallel to the Menda in its upper and middle course. It flows mostly across Megino-Kangalassky District but in one stretch it forms the border between this district and Khangalassky District. There are a few small lakes in the lower course of the river, part of the neighboring Lena floodplain. Finally it meets the Khaptagay arm of the Lena 1,528 kilometres (949 mi) from its source near the village of Khaptagay, south of Yakutsk.

The largest tributary of the Tamma is the 123 kilometres (76 mi) long Khompu from the right. The river freezes between October and May.

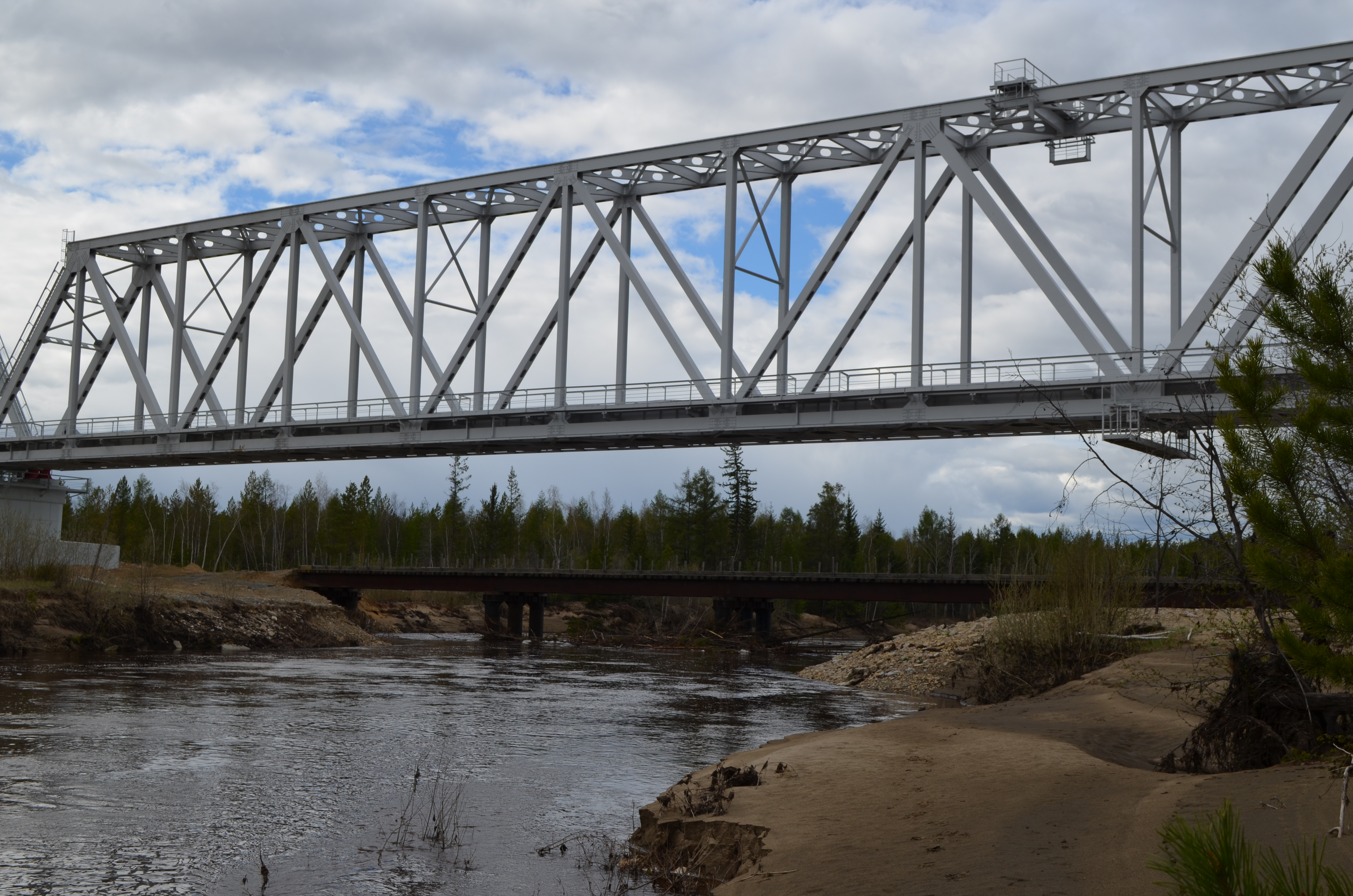
Railway bridge across the Tamma.

Basin of the Lena

== See also ==
- List of rivers of Russia
