= Suola (river) =

River in Russia

Suola Yakut: Суола
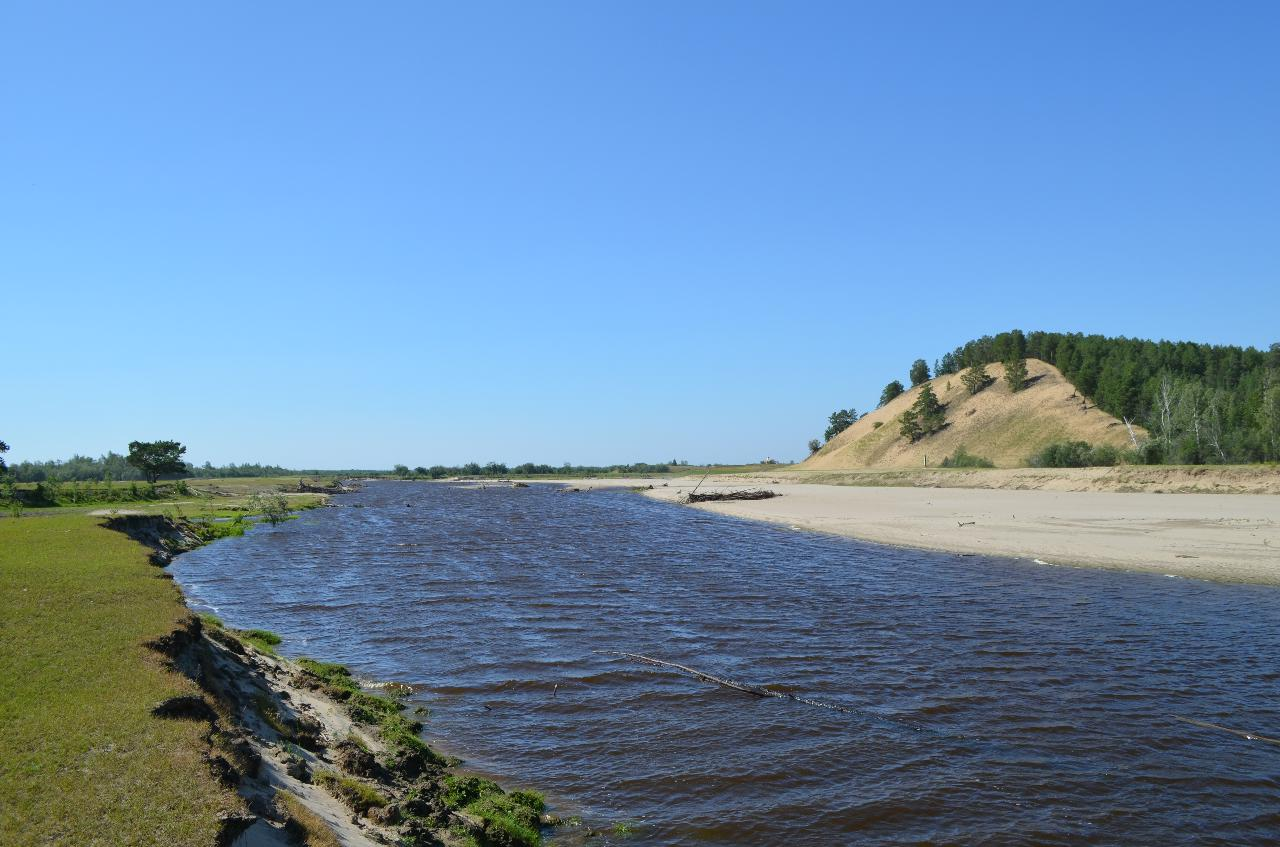
- The Suola River and Suullar Myraan hill near the village of Tyokhtyur

- Location in the Sakha Republic, Russia

Location
- Republic: Sakha, Russia

Physical characteristics
- Source
  - location: Prilensky Plateau
  - coordinates: 61°20′0″N 131°25′20″E
- Mouth
  - location: Lena
  - coordinates: 62°07′23″N 129°59′44″E
- Length: 224 km (139 mi)
- Basin size: 5,400 km^{2} (2,100 sq mi)
- Discharge
  - average: 0.74 m^{3}/s (26 cu ft/s)

Basin features
- Progression: Lena→ Laptev Sea

The Suola (Russian: Суола) is a river in the Sakha Republic, Russia. It is a right tributary of the Lena and has a length of 224 km (139 mi).

The famous hill Suullar Myraan is located in the river valley.

== Course ==
The river begins in the Lena Plateau (Приленское плато) at an elevation of 332 metres (1,089 ft). It flows roughly westwards across the lowland, with the Myla to the south among almost 1,500 lakes. The river joins the Lena 1,488 km (925 mi) from its mouth on the eastern bank, a little north of Yakutsk, the capital of the Sakha Republic.

The Suola freezes between October and mid May. It flows across the Amginsky District and the Megino-Kangalassky District and there are numerous settlements in its basin such as Satagay, Mukuluk, Suola, Byuteydyakh, Tyokhtyur and Tomtor. This river is an important source of drinking water for many villages.

The main tributaries of the Suola are the 67 km (42 mi) long Kuollara (Куоллара) and the 94 km (58 mi) long Tyere (Тиере), both joining it from the right side.

Basin of the Lena

== See also ==
- List of rivers of Russia
