= Mayya (rural locality) =

Mayya Майя
- Selo
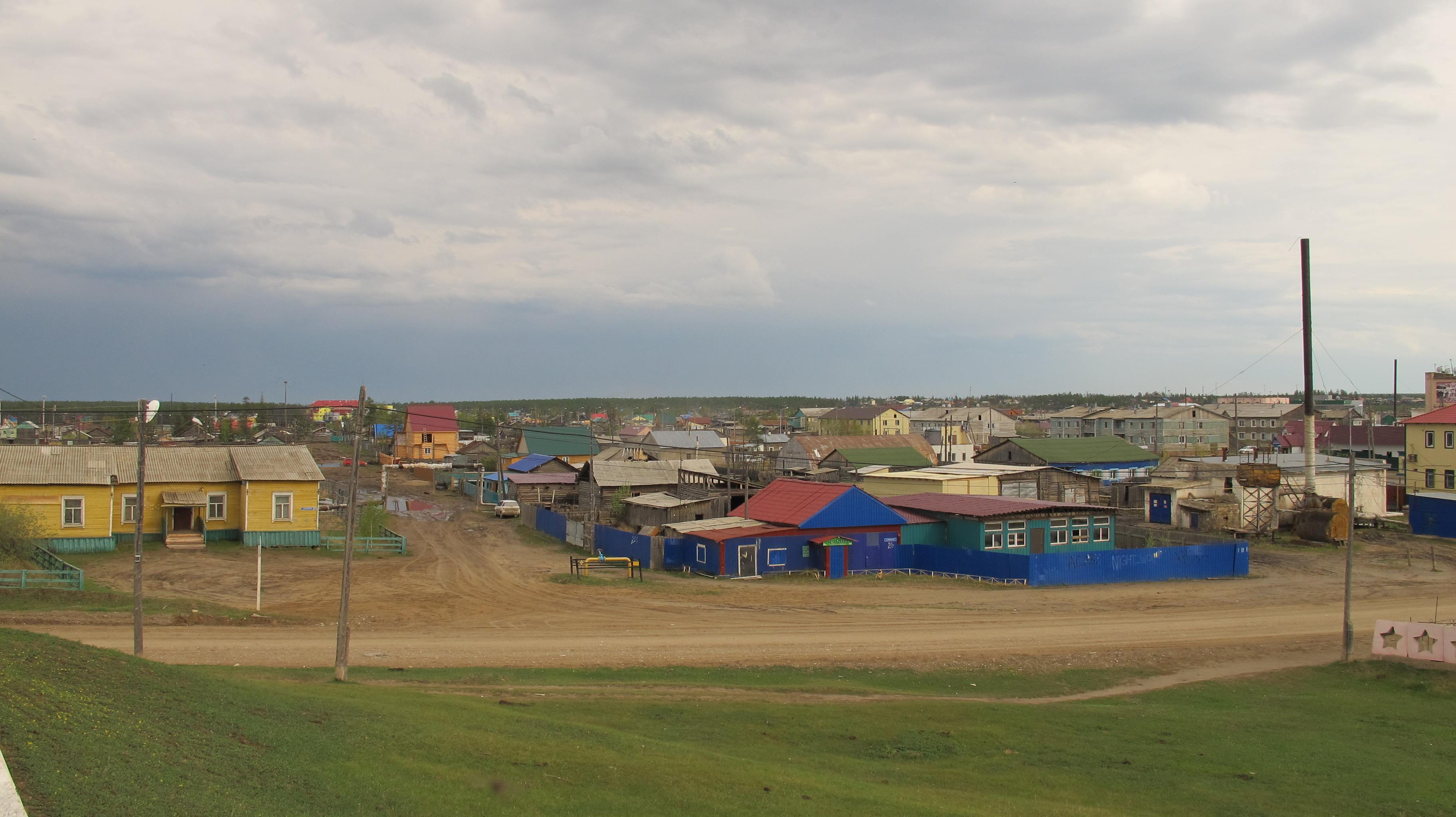
- View of Mayya, Sakha Republic
- Interactive map of Mayya
- Location of Mayya Mayya (Sakha Republic)
- Coordinates: 61°38′N 130°07′E
- Country: Russia
- Federal subject: Sakha Republic
- Administrative district: Megino-Kangalassky District
- VillageSelsoviet: Village of Mayya
- Founded: 1902
- Elevation: 145 m (476 ft)

Population (2010 Census)
  - Total: 7,288
  - Estimate (2021): 7,322 (+0.5%)

Administrative status
  - Capital of: Village of Mayya

Municipal status
  - Municipal district: Megino-Kangalassky Municipal District
  - Rural settlement: Mayya Rural Settlement
  - Capital of: Mayya Rural Settlement
- Time zone: UTC+
- Postal code: 678070
- OKTMO ID: 98629415101

Mayya (Russian: Майя, Yakut: Майа, Maya) is a rural locality (a selo), the only inhabited locality, and the administrative center of the Selo of Maya of Megino-Kangalassky District in the Sakha Republic, Russia, located 34 kilometers (21 mi) from Nizhny Bestyakh, the administrative center of the district. Its population as of the 2010 Census was 7,288, of whom 3,385 were male and 3,903 female, up from 7,023 as recorded during the 2002 Census.

== History ==
The village, inhabited mainly by Yakuts, was founded in 1902. It was made the administrative centre of the Megino-Kangalassky District upon its formation in 1930, a position it held until 2007, when the administration was moved to the more central, though smaller, settlement of Nizhny Bestyakh, located around 30 km north-west.
