= Nizhny Bestyakh =

Nizhny Bestyakh Нижний Бестях
- Urban-type settlement

Other transcription(s)
  - Yakut: Аллараа Бэстээх
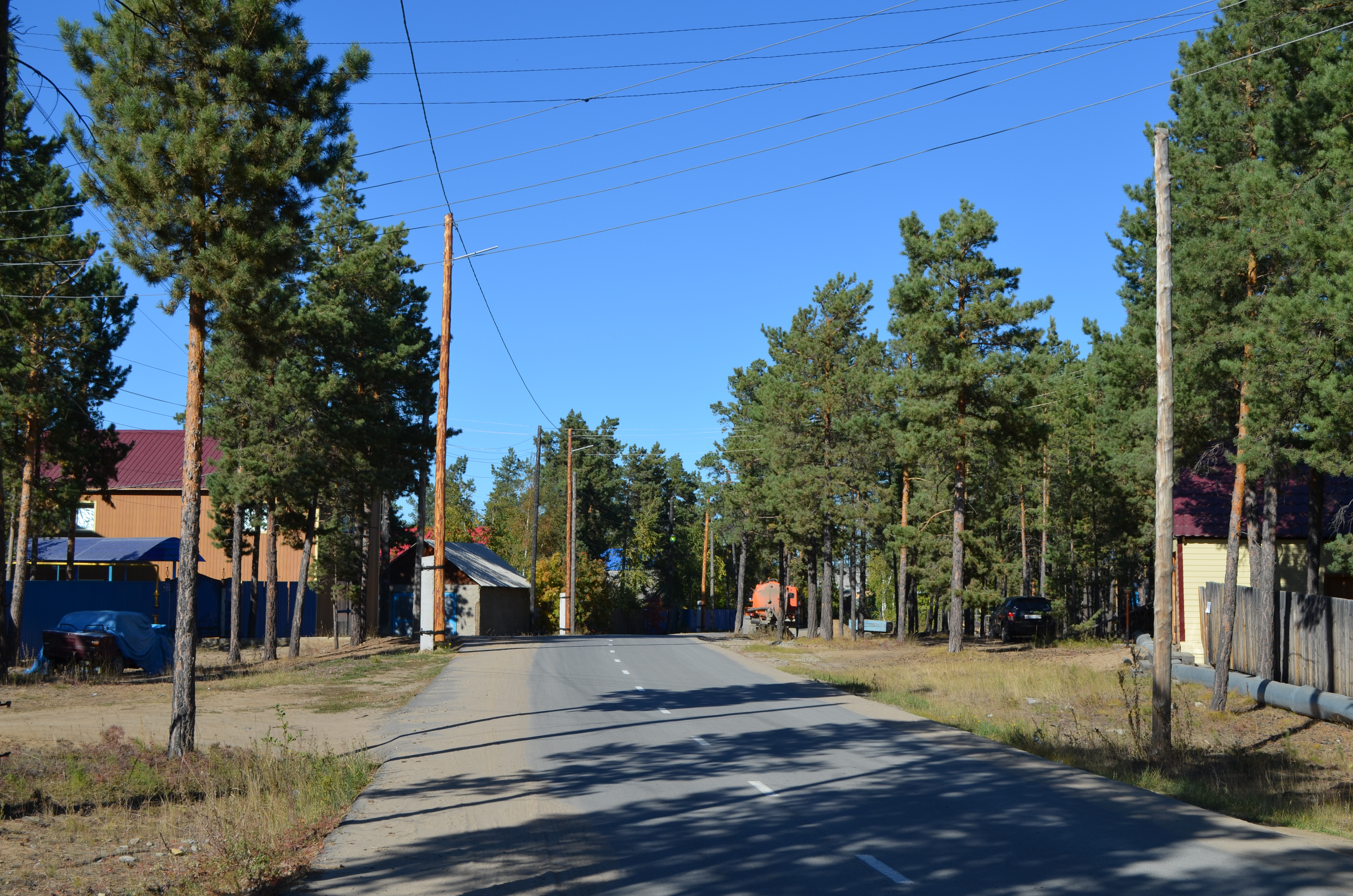
- In Nizhny Bestyakh
- Interactive map of Nizhny Bestyakh
- Location of Nizhny Bestyakh Nizhny Bestyakh (Sakha Republic)
- Coordinates: 61°58′N 129°55′E
- Country: Russia
- Federal subject: Sakha Republic
- Administrative district: Megino-Kangalassky District
- SettlementSelsoviet: Settlement of Nizhny Bestyakh
- Founded: 1920
- Urban-type settlement status since: 1971
- Elevation: 138 m (453 ft)

Population (2010 Census)
  - Total: 3,518
  - Estimate (2023): 5,139 (+46.1%)

Administrative status
  - Capital of: Settlement of Nizhny Bestyakh

Municipal status
  - Municipal district: Megino-Kangalassky Municipal District
  - Urban settlement: Nizhny Bestyakh Urban Settlement
  - Capital of: Nizhny Bestyakh Urban Settlement
- Time zone: UTC+
- Postal code: 678080
- OKTMO ID: 98629155051

Nizhny Bestyakh population
- 2010 Census: 3,518
- 2002 Census: 3,327
- 1989 Census: 3,997
- 1979 Census: 3,363

Nizhny Bestyakh (Russian: Ни́жний Бестя́х; Yakut: Аллараа Бэстээх, Allaraa Besteex) is an urban locality (an urban-type settlement) in Megino-Kangalassky District of the Sakha Republic, Russia, located on the east bank of the Lena River, opposite the republic's capital city of Yakutsk, 34 kilometers (21 mi) from Mayya, the administrative center of the district. As of the 2010 Census, its population was 3,518.

== History ==
The predecessor of Nizhny Bestyakh was called Yarmanka (sometimes spelled Yarmonka or Yarmonga). Here, at the mouth of the Suola River, from about 1750 to 1850, pack horses were loaded for the long journey down to the Okhotsk Coast. A ferry service was founded in 1772 and operated by exiles for five months a year. It was a gathering place for merchants and cargoes bound eastward. There was ample grass for the herds of cattle and pack horses.

Urban-type settlement status was granted to Nizhny Bestyakh in 1971.

== Administrative and municipal status ==
Within the framework of administrative divisions, the urban-type settlement of Nizhny Bestyakh is incorporated within Megino-Kangalassky District as the Settlement of Nizhny Bestyakh. As a municipal division, the Settlement of Nizhny Bestyakh is incorporated within Megino-Kangalassky Municipal District as Nizhny Bestyakh Urban Settlement.

== Transportation ==
Nizhny Bestyakh is the terminus of the only road connection to Yakutsk, the Lena Highway, and is the starting point of the Kolyma Highway, leading to Magadan and the Pacific Ocean coast further east. A ferry allows for transport across the Lena River in summer; in winter, traffic drives directly across the ice on the frozen river. In spring and fall, the crossing is not possible due to the movement of ice. However, the Lena Bridge is under construction further upstream, which will allow a year-round land transport connection with Yakutsk beginning in 2028.

Nizhny Bestyakh is the terminus of the Amur–Yakutsk Mainline. In future, Nizhny Bestyakh may find itself on the route for planned extensions of the railway towards Magadan. There are plans to make it a transportation hub for northeastern Siberia and to eventually grant it town status. The railhead for construction of the railway reached Nizhny Bestyakh in late 2011. In October 2019, the European Rail Timetable compilers report that a passenger train is now running on alternate days on the Amur-Yakutsk main line, terminating at Nizhny Bestyakh.

== Geography ==
=== Climate ===
Nizhny-Bestyakh has an extremely continental subarctic climate (Köppen Climate Classification Dfd). Despite extreme winters, summers can be quite warm due to lack of any maritime moderation, sometimes exceeding 30 °C (86 °F), similar to nearby Yakutsk. Indeed, the summers are probably the warmest on average for Dfd/Dsd/Dwd climates. The climate is very dry and most precipitation occurs in warmer months.

Climate data for Yakutsk, a city next to NB, 1981–2010 normals, extremes 1891–present
Month	Jan	Feb	Mar	Apr	May	Jun	Jul	Aug	Sep	Oct	Nov	Dec	Year
Record high °C (°F)	−11.5 (11.3)	−2.2 (28.0)	8.3 (46.9)	21.1 (70.0)	31.1 (88.0)	35.1 (95.2)	38.4 (101.1)	35.4 (95.7)	27.0 (80.6)	18.6 (65.5)	3.9 (39.0)	−3.9 (25.0)	38.4 (101.1)
Mean daily maximum °C (°F)	−35.7 (−32.3)	−28.7 (−19.7)	−12.3 (9.9)	1.7 (35.1)	13.2 (55.8)	22.4 (72.3)	25.5 (77.9)	21.5 (70.7)	11.5 (52.7)	−3.6 (25.5)	−23.2 (−9.8)	−34.6 (−30.3)	−3.5 (25.7)
Daily mean °C (°F)	−38.6 (−37.5)	−33.8 (−28.8)	−20.1 (−4.2)	−4.8 (23.4)	7.5 (45.5)	16.4 (61.5)	19.5 (67.1)	15.2 (59.4)	6.1 (43.0)	−7.8 (18.0)	−27.0 (−16.6)	−37.6 (−35.7)	−8.8 (16.2)
Mean daily minimum °C (°F)	−41.5 (−42.7)	−38.2 (−36.8)	−27.4 (−17.3)	−11.8 (10.8)	1.0 (33.8)	9.3 (48.7)	12.7 (54.9)	8.9 (48.0)	1.2 (34.2)	−12.2 (10.0)	−31.0 (−23.8)	−40.4 (−40.7)	−14.1 (6.6)
Record low °C (°F)	−63.0 (−81.4)	−64.4 (−83.9)	−54.9 (−66.8)	−41.0 (−41.8)	−18.1 (−0.6)	−4.5 (23.9)	−1.5 (29.3)	−7.8 (18.0)	−14.2 (6.4)	−40.9 (−41.6)	−54.5 (−66.1)	−59.8 (−75.6)	−64.4 (−83.9)
Average precipitation mm (inches)	9 (0.4)	8 (0.3)	7 (0.3)	8 (0.3)	20 (0.8)	36 (1.4)	39 (1.5)	37 (1.5)	31 (1.2)	18 (0.7)	16 (0.6)	10 (0.4)	237 (9.3)
Average rainy days	0	0	0.1	3	14	16	15	15	16	4	0.1	0	83
Average snowy days	28	28	17	10	5	0.3	0.03	0	4	25	28	27	172
Average relative humidity (%)	76	76	70	60	54	57	62	67	72	78	78	76	69
Mean monthly sunshine hours	19	97	234	274	303	333	347	273	174	106	59	12	2,231
Source 1: Погода и Климат
Source 2: NOAA (sun, 1961–1990)
