= Frunze, Russia =

Frunze (Russian: Фру́нзе) is the name of several rural localities in Russia.

== Modern localities ==
- Frunze, Burayevsky District, Republic of Bashkortostan, a village in Kashkalevsky Selsoviet of Burayevsky District in the Republic of Bashkortostan
- Frunze, Iglinsky District, Republic of Bashkortostan, a village in Kaltymanovsky Selsoviet of Iglinsky District in the Republic of Bashkortostan
- Frunze, Tuymazinsky District, Republic of Bashkortostan, a village in Verkhnetroitsky Selsoviet of Tuymazinsky District in the Republic of Bashkortostan
- Frunze, Lebyazhyevsky District, Kurgan Oblast, a village in Yeloshansky Selsoviet of Lebyazhyevsky District in Kurgan Oblast; 55°33′N 66°45′E
- Frunze, Shadrinsky District, Kurgan Oblast, a village in Peschanotavolzhansky Selsoviet of Shadrinsky District in Kurgan Oblast; 55°47′N 63°18′E
- Frunze, Omsk Oblast, a village in Zalivinsky Rural Okrug of Tarsky District in Omsk Oblast
- Frunze, Rostov Oblast, a khutor in Nikolskoye Rural Settlement of Zavetinsky District in Rostov Oblast
- Frunze, Sakha Republic, a selo in Frunzensky Rural Okrug of Namsky District in the Sakha Republic

== Alternative names ==
- Frunze, alternative name of imeni Frunze, a settlement in Ust-Kazhinsky Selsoviet of Krasnogorsky District in Altai Krai; 52°35′N 86°20′E
