= Kharyyalakh =

Kharyyalakh (Russian: Харыялах) is the name of several rural localities in the Sakha Republic, Russia:

- Kharyyalakh, Gorny District, Sakha Republic, a selo in Odununsky Rural Okrug of Gorny District
- Kharyyalakh, Khangalassky District, Sakha Republic, a selo in Tit-Arynsky Rural Okrug of Khangalassky District
- Kharyyalakh, Namsky District, Sakha Republic, a selo in Kebekyonsky Rural Okrug of Namsky District
- Kharyyalakh, Olenyoksky District, Sakha Republic, a selo in Kirbeysky Rural Okrug of Olenyoksky District
- Kharyyalakh, Olyokminsky District, Sakha Republic, a selo in Solyansky Rural Okrug of Olyokminsky District
- Kharyyalakh, Suntarsky District, Sakha Republic, a selo in Kyundyayinsky Rural Okrug of Suntarsky District
- Kharyyalakh, Verkhnevilyuysky District, Sakha Republic, a selo in Kentiksky Rural Okrug of Verkhnevilyuysky District
