= Tysagachchy =

Tysagachchcy Тысагаччы
- Selo
- Interactive map of Tysagachchcy
- Location of Tysagachchcy Tysagachchcy (Sakha Republic)
- Coordinates: 62°21′34″N 124°47′12″E
- Country: Russia
- Federal subject: Sakha Republic
- Administrative district: Gorny District
- Rural okrugSelsoviet: Maltaninsky Rural Okrug

Population
  - Estimate (2002): 2 )

Municipal status
  - Municipal district: Gorny Municipal District
  - Rural settlement: Maltaninsky Rural Settlement
- Time zone: UTC+
- Postal code: 678030
- OKTMO ID: 98620433111

Tysagachchcy (Yakut: Тыһаҕаччы, Tıhağaççı; Russian: Тысагаччы) is a rural locality (a selo), one of three settlements, in addition to Keptin and Tongulakh, in Maltaninsky Rural Okrug of Gorny District in the Sakha Republic, Russia. It is located 178 kilometers (111 mi) from Berdigestyakh, the administrative center of the district and 10 kilometers (6.2 mi) from Keptin. Its population as of the 2002 Census was 2.
