= Chekya-Byas =

Chekya-Byas Чекя-Бясь
- Selo
- Interactive map of Chekya-Byas
- Location of Chekya-Byas Chekya-Byas (Sakha Republic)
- Coordinates: 62°14′11″N 126°40′36″E
- Country: Russia
- Federal subject: Sakha Republic
- Administrative district: Gorny District
- Rural okrugSelsoviet: Kirovsky Rural Okrug

Population
  - Estimate (2002): 0 )

Municipal status
  - Municipal district: Gorny Municipal District
  - Rural settlement: Kirovsky Rural Settlement
- Time zone: UTC+
- Postal code: 678030
- OKTMO ID: 98620417106

Chekya-Byas (Russian: Чекя-Бясь) is a rural locality (a selo), one of two settlements, in addition to Asyma, in Kirovsky Rural Okrug of Gorny District in the Sakha Republic, Russia. It is located 15 kilometers (9.3 mi) from Berdigestyakh, the administrative center of the district and 15 kilometers (9.3 mi) from Asyma. Its population as of the 2002 Census was 0.
