= Ulu-Sysy =

Ulu-Sysy Улу-Сысы
- Selo
- Interactive map of Ulu-Sysy
- Location of Ulu-Sysy Ulu-Sysy (Sakha Republic)
- Coordinates: 62°42′N 128°27′E
- Country: Russia
- Federal subject: Sakha Republic
- Administrative district: Gorny District
- Rural okrugSelsoviet: Odununsky Rural Okrug

Population
  - Estimate (2002): 22 )

Municipal status
  - Municipal district: Gorny Municipal District
  - Rural settlement: Odununsky Rural Settlement
- Time zone: UTC+
- Postal code: 678030
- OKTMO ID: 98620449106

Ulu-Sysy (Russian: Улу-Сысы; Yakut: Улуу Сыһыы, Uluu Sıhıı) is a rural locality (a selo) in Odununsky Rural Okrug of Gorny District in the Sakha Republic, Russia, located 187 kilometers (116 mi) from Berdigestyakh, the administrative center of the district and 100 kilometers (62 mi) from Magaras, the administrative center of the rural okrug. Its population as of the 2002 Census was 22.
