= Kysyl-Syr =

Kysyl-Syr (Russian: Кысыл-Сыр; Yakut: Кыһыл Сыыр) is the name of several inhabited localities in the Sakha Republic, Russia.

Urban localities

- Kysyl-Syr, Vilyuysky District, Sakha Republic, an urban-type settlement in Vilyuysky District

Rural localities

- Kysyl-Syr, Namsky District, Sakha Republic, a selo in Khomustakhsky 1-y Rural Okrug of Namsky District
