= Shologonsky Rural Okrug =

Shologonsky Rural Okrug is the name of two low-level administrative divisions in the Sakha Republic, Russia:

- Shologonsky Rural Okrug, Olenyoksky District, Sakha Republic, an ethnic rural okrug of Olenyoksky District
- Shologonsky Rural Okrug, Gorny District, Sakha Republic, a rural okrug of Gorny District
