= Kysyl-Derevnya =

Kysyl-Derevnya Кысыл-Деревня
- Selo
- Interactive map of Kysyl-Derevnya
- Location of Kysyl-Derevnya Kysyl-Derevnya (Sakha Republic)
- Coordinates: 62°47′N 129°38′E
- Country: Russia
- Federal subject: Sakha Republic
- Administrative district: Namsky District
- Rural okrugSelsoviet: Khatyn-Arinsky Rural Okrug

Population (2010 Census)
  - Total: 258
  - Estimate (2021): 277 (+7.4%)

Municipal status
  - Municipal district: Namsky Municipal District
  - Rural settlement: Khatyn-Arynsky Rural Settlement
- Time zone: UTC+9 (MSK+6)
- Postal code: 678388
- OKTMO ID: 98635455111

Kysyl-Derevnya (Russian: Кысыл-Деревня; Yakut: Кыһыл Дэриэбинэ, Kıhıl Deriebine) is a rural locality (a selo) in Khatyn-Arinsky Rural Okrug of Namsky District in the Sakha Republic, Russia, located 8 kilometers (5.0 mi) from Namtsy, the administrative center of the district, and 3 kilometers (1.9 mi) from Appany, the administrative center of the rural okrug. Its population as of the 2010 Census was 258; up from 244 recorded in the 2002 Census.
