= Ebya =

Ebya (Russian: Эбя) is the name of several rural localities in the Sakha Republic, Russia:

- Ebya, Gorny District, Sakha Republic, a selo in Mytakhsky Rural Okrug of Gorny District
- Ebya, Vilyuysky District, Sakha Republic, a selo in Zhemkonsky Rural Okrug of Vilyuysky District
