= Tumul =

Tumul (Russian: Тумул) is the name of several rural localities in the Sakha Republic, Russia:

- Tumul, Khangalassky District, Sakha Republic, a selo in Tumulsky Rural Okrug of Khangalassky District
- Tumul, Megino-Kangalassky District, Sakha Republic, a selo in Dollunsky Rural Okrug of Megino-Kangalassky District
- Tumul, Namsky District, Sakha Republic, a selo in Modutsky Rural Okrug of Namsky District
- Tumul, Suntarsky District, Sakha Republic, a selo in Kutaninsky Rural Okrug of Suntarsky District
- Tumul, Ust-Aldansky District, Sakha Republic, a selo in Borogonsky Rural Okrug of Ust-Aldansky District
- Tumul, Ust-Maysky District, Sakha Republic, a selo in Kyupsky Natsionalny Rural Okrug of Ust-Maysky District
