= Byas-Kyuyol =

Byas-Kyuyol (Russian: Бясь-Кюёль) is the name of several rural localities in the Sakha Republic, Russia:

- Byas-Kyuyol, Gorny District, Sakha Republic, a selo in Atamaysky Rural Okrug of Gorny District
- Byas-Kyuyol, Olyokminsky District, Sakha Republic, a selo in Charinsky Rural Okrug of Olyokminsky District
