= Yergyolyokh =

Yergyolyokh Ергёлёх
- Selo
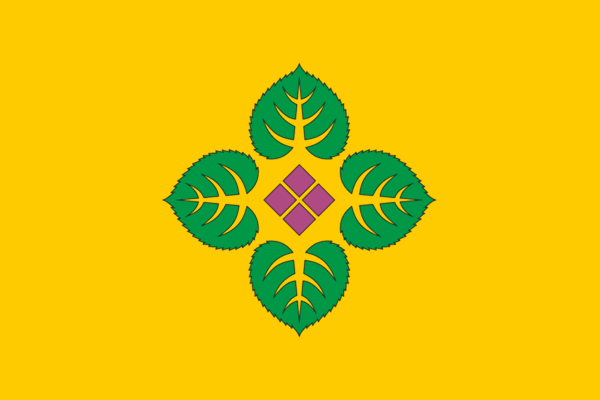
- Flag
- Interactive map of Yergyolyokh
- Location of Yergyolyokh Yergyolyokh (Sakha Republic)
- Coordinates: 62°35′06″N 128°51′53″E
- Country: Russia
- Federal subject: Sakha Republic
- Administrative district: Namsky District
- Rural okrugSelsoviet: Tastakhsky Rural Okrug

Population (2010 Census)
  - Total: 273
  - Estimate (2021): 292 (+7%)

Administrative status
  - Capital of: Tastakhsky Rural Okrug

Municipal status
  - Municipal district: Namsky Municipal District
  - Rural settlement: Tastakhsky Rural Settlement
  - Capital of: Tastakhsky Rural Settlement
- Time zone: UTC+9 (MSK+6)
- Postal code: 678380
- OKTMO ID: 98635443101

Yergyolyokh (Russian: Ергёлёх; Yakut: Өргөлөөх, Örgölööx) is a rural locality (a selo), the only inhabited locality, and the administrative center of Tastakhsky Rural Okrug of Namsky District in the Sakha Republic, Russia, located 65 kilometers (40 mi) from Namtsy, the administrative center of the district. Its population as of the 2010 Census was 273, up from 267 recorded during the 2002 Census.
