= Khongor-Biye =

Khongor-Biye Хонгор-Бие
- Selo
- Interactive map of Khongor-Biye
- Location of Khongor-Biye Khongor-Biye (Sakha Republic)
- Coordinates: 62°50′25″N 129°28′34″E
- Country: Russia
- Federal subject: Sakha Republic
- Administrative district: Namsky District
- Rural okrugSelsoviet: Salbansky Rural Okrug

Population (2010 Census)
  - Total: 345
  - Estimate (2021): 324 (−6.1%)

Administrative status
  - Capital of: Salbansky Rural Okrug

Municipal status
  - Municipal district: Namsky Municipal District
  - Rural settlement: Salbansky Rural Settlement
  - Capital of: Salbansky Rural Settlement
- Time zone: UTC+9 (MSK+6)
- Postal code: 678395
- OKTMO ID: 98635440101

Khongor-Biye (Russian: Хонгор-Бие; Yakut: Хоҥор Биэ, Xoŋor Bie) is a rural locality (a selo), the only inhabited locality, and the administrative center of Salbansky Rural Okrug of Namsky District in the Sakha Republic, Russia, located 72 kilometers (45 mi) from Namtsy, the administrative center of the district. Its population as of the 2010 Census was 345, of whom 180 were male and 165 female, up from 338 as recorded during the 2002 Census.
