= Yuner-Olokh =

Yuner-Olokh Юнер-Олох
- Selo
- Interactive map of Yuner-Olokh
- Location of Yuner-Olokh Yuner-Olokh (Sakha Republic)
- Coordinates: 62°45′N 129°52′E
- Country: Russia
- Federal subject: Sakha Republic
- Administrative district: Namsky District
- Rural okrugSelsoviet: Khomustakhsky 2-y Rural Okrug

Population
  - Estimate (2002): 3 )

Municipal status
  - Municipal district: Namsky Municipal District
  - Rural settlement: Khomustakhsky 2-y Rural Settlement
- Time zone: UTC+9 (MSK+6)
- Postal code: 678384
- OKTMO ID: 98635466116

Yuner-Olokh (Russian: Юнер-Олох; Yakut: Үүнэр Олох, Üüner Olox) is a rural locality (a selo) in Khomustakhsky 2-y Rural Okrug of Namsky District in the Sakha Republic, Russia, located 31 kilometers (19 mi) from Namtsy, the administrative center of the district and 5 kilometers (3.1 mi) from Khatas, the administrative center of the rural okrug. Its population as of the 2002 Census was 3.
