= Sygynnakh =

Sygynnakh Сыгыннах
- Selo
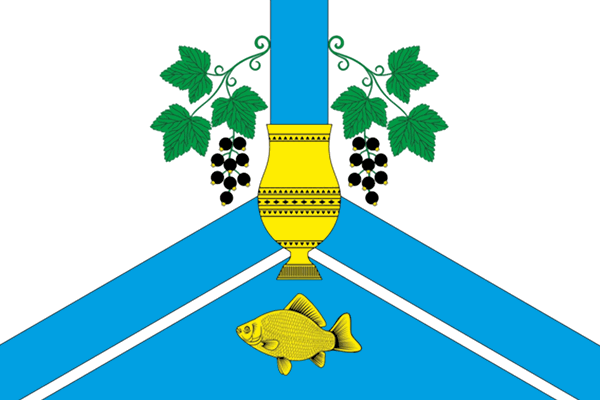
- Flag
- Interactive map of Sygynnakh
- Location of Sygynnakh Sygynnakh (Sakha Republic)
- Coordinates: 63°22′N 129°39′E
- Country: Russia
- Federal subject: Sakha Republic
- Administrative district: Namsky District
- Rural okrugSelsoviet: Arbynsky Rural Okrug

Population (2010 Census)
  - Total: 268
  - Estimate (2021): 232 (−13.4%)

Administrative status
  - Capital of: Arbynsky Rural Okrug

Municipal status
  - Municipal district: Namsky Municipal District
  - Rural settlement: Arbynsky Rural Settlement
  - Capital of: Arbynsky Rural Settlement
- Time zone: UTC+9 (MSK+6)
- Postal code: 678387
- OKTMO ID: 98635405101

Sygynnakh (Russian: Сыгыннах; Yakut: Сыгыннаах, Sıgınnaax) is a rural locality (a selo), the only inhabited locality, and the administrative center of Arbynsky Rural Okrug of Namsky District in the Sakha Republic, Russia, located 90 kilometers (56 mi) from Namtsy, the administrative center of the district. Its population as of the 2010 Census was 268, down from 270 recorded during the 2002 Census.
