= Krest-Kytyl =

Krest-Kytyl Крест-Кытыл
- Selo
- Interactive map of Krest-Kytyl
- Location of Krest-Kytyl Krest-Kytyl (Sakha Republic)
- Coordinates: 62°39′50″N 129°42′38″E
- Country: Russia
- Federal subject: Sakha Republic
- Administrative district: Namsky District
- Rural okrugSelsoviet: Khamagattinsky Rural Okrug
- Founded: 1799

Population (2010 Census)
  - Total: 1,727
  - Estimate (2021): 1,906 (+10.4%)

Administrative status
  - Capital of: Khamagattinsky Rural Okrug

Municipal status
  - Municipal district: Namsky Municipal District
  - Rural settlement: Khamagattinsky Rural Settlement
  - Capital of: Khamagattinsky Rural Settlement
- Time zone: UTC+9 (MSK+6)
- Postal code: 678383
- OKTMO ID: 98635450101

Krest-Kytyl (Russian: Крест-Кытыл; Yakut: Кириэс-Кытыл, Kiries-Kıtıl) is a rural locality (a selo), the only inhabited locality, and the administrative center of Khamagattinsky Rural Okrug of Namsky District in the Sakha Republic, Russia, located 7 kilometers (4.3 mi) from Namtsy, the administrative center of the district. Its population as of the 2010 Census was 1,727, of whom 822 were male and 905 female, up from 1,634 as recorded during the 2002 Census.
