= Maymaga =

Maymaga Маймага
- Selo
- Interactive map of Maymaga
- Location of Maymaga Maymaga (Sakha Republic)
- Coordinates: 63°03′N 129°31′E
- Country: Russia
- Federal subject: Sakha Republic
- Administrative district: Namsky District
- Rural okrugSelsoviet: Khatyryksky Rural Okrug

Population (2010 Census)
  - Total: 157
  - Estimate (2021): 139 (−11.5%)

Municipal status
  - Municipal district: Namsky Municipal District
  - Rural settlement: Maymaga Rural Settlement
  - Capital of: Maymaga Rural Settlement
- Time zone: UTC+9 (MSK+6)
- Postal code: 678385
- OKTMO ID: 98635470101

Maymaga (Russian: Маймага; Yakut: Маймаҕа, Maymağa) is a rural locality (a selo) in Khatyryksky Rural Okrug of Namsky District in the Sakha Republic, Russia, located 42 kilometers (26 mi) from Namtsy, the administrative center of the district. Its population as of the 2010 Census was 157, up from 152 recorded during the 2002 Census.
