= Tongulakh =

Tongulakh Тонгулах
- Selo
- Interactive map of Tongulakh
- Location of Tongulakh Tongulakh (Sakha Republic)
- Coordinates: 61°57′N 124°32′E
- Country: Russia
- Federal subject: Sakha Republic
- Administrative district: Gorny District
- Rural okrugSelsoviet: Maltaninsky Rural Okrug

Population (2010 Census)
  - Total: 10
  - Estimate (2021): 15 (+50%)

Municipal status
  - Municipal district: Gorny Municipal District
  - Rural settlement: Maltaninsky Rural Settlement
- Time zone: UTC+
- Postal code: 678030
- OKTMO ID: 98620433106

Tongulakh (Russian: Тонгулах) is a rural locality (a selo) in Maltaninsky Rural Okrug of Gorny District in the Sakha Republic, Russia, located 258 kilometers (160 mi) from Berdigestyakh, the administrative center of the district, and 70 kilometers (43 mi) from Keptin, the administrative center of the rural okrug. Its population as of the 2010 Census was 10; down from 11 recorded in the 2002 Census.

== Climate ==
The region is known for its climate extremes and is one of the coldest areas in the Northern Hemisphere. On 18 January 2023, a temperature of −62.7 °C (−80.9 °F) was recorded at Tongulakh, an all-time low for the area and the lowest in Russia since February 2002.

At January that temperature was recorded since January 1982, for 41 years!
