= Byutyay-Yurdya =

Byutyay-Yurdya Бютяй-Юрдя
- Selo
- Interactive map of Byutyay-Yurdya
- Location of Byutyay-Yurdya Byutyay-Yurdya (Sakha Republic)
- Coordinates: 62°50′N 129°35′E
- Country: Russia
- Federal subject: Sakha Republic
- Administrative district: Namsky District
- Rural okrugSelsoviet: Betyunsky Rural Okrug

Population (2010 Census)
  - Total: 608
  - Estimate (2021): 581 (−4.4%)

Administrative status
  - Capital of: Betyunsky Rural Okrug

Municipal status
  - Municipal district: Namsky Municipal District
  - Rural settlement: Betyunsky Rural Settlement
  - Capital of: Betyunsky Rural Settlement
- Time zone: UTC+9 (MSK+6)
- Postal code: 678396
- OKTMO ID: 98635410101

Byutyay-Yurdya (Russian: Бютяй-Юрдя; Yakut: Бүтэй Үрдэ, Bütey Ürde) is a rural locality (a selo), the only inhabited locality, and the administrative center of Betyunsky Rural Okrug of Namsky District in the Sakha Republic, Russia, located 12 kilometers (7.5 mi) from Namtsy, the administrative center of the district. Its population as of the 2010 Census was 608, up from 578 recorded during the 2002 Census.
