= Chyna (river) =

River in Yakutia, Russia

Chyna Чына
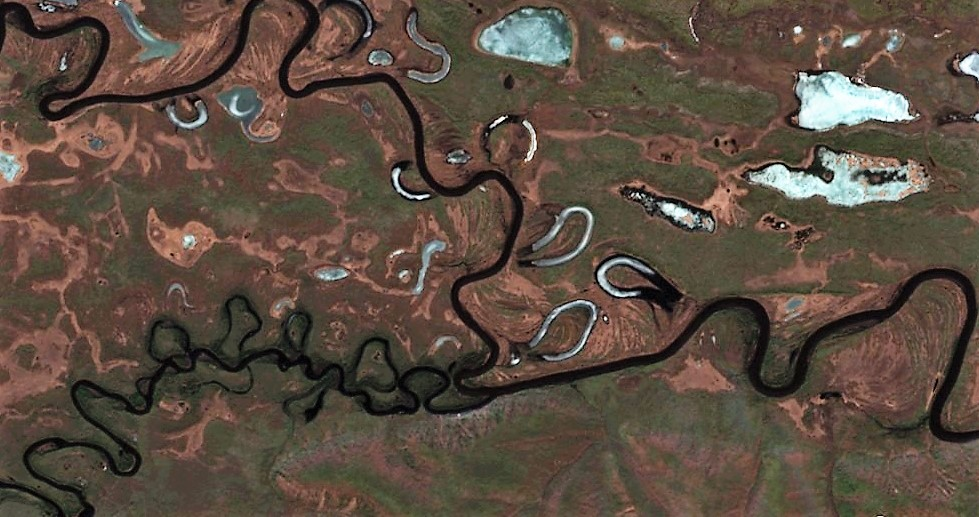
- Confluence of the Chyna and the Synyaya Sentinel-2 image

- Location in Yakutia, Russia

Location
- Federal Subject: Yakutia, Russia

Physical characteristics
- Source
  - location: Lena Plateau
  - coordinates: 61°48′52″N 123°33′05″E
- Mouth
  - location: Sinyaya
  - coordinates: 61°35′49″N 125°49′46″E
  - elevation: 158 m (518 ft)
- Length: 240 km (150 mi)
- Basin size: 5,070 km^{2} (1,960 sq mi)

Basin features
- Progression: Sinyaya→ Lena→ Laptev Sea

The Chyna (Russian: Чына; Yakut: Чына) is a river in Yakutia (Sakha Republic), Russia. It is the longest tributary of the Sinyaya of the Lena basin, with a length of 240 kilometres (150 mi) and a drainage basin of 5,070 square kilometres (1,960 sq mi).

The river flows across the mostly uninhabited Gorny District. The nearest inhabited place is Dikimdya, located about 60 km (37 mi) northeast of its mouth.

== Course ==
The Chyna begins in the southern sector of the Lena Plateau, near the sources of the Markhachan. It flows first roughly southeastwards across the plateau. About midway through its course the river bends in a wide arch and heads northeastwards, meandering strongly within the floodplain. Finally it meets the right bank of the Sinyaya, a tributary of the Lena, 177 km (110 mi) upstream from its mouth. The river freezes in the second half of October and stays under ice until the second half of May.

There are about 150 lakes in the river basin. The main tributaries of the Chyna are the 66 km (41 mi) long Keibele and the 54 km (34 mi) long Tyympynay (Tyympy) from the left.

== See also ==
- List of rivers of Russia
