= Kyuyorelyakh =

Kyuyorelyakh Кюёрелях
- Selo
- Interactive map of Kyuyorelyakh
- Location of Kyuyorelyakh Kyuyorelyakh (Sakha Republic)
- Coordinates: 62°34′16″N 126°50′26″E
- Country: Russia
- Federal subject: Sakha Republic
- Administrative district: Gorny District
- Rural okrugSelsoviet: Oktyabrsky Rural Okrug

Population (2010 Census)
  - Total: 541
  - Estimate (2021): 539 (−0.4%)

Administrative status
  - Capital of: Oktyabrsky Rural Okrug

Municipal status
  - Municipal district: Gorny Municipal District
  - Rural settlement: Oktyabrsky Rural Settlement
  - Capital of: Oktyabrsky Rural Settlement
- Time zone: UTC+
- Postal code: 678038
- OKTMO ID: 98620452101

Kyuyorelyakh (Yakut: Күөрэлээх, Küöreleex Russian: Кюёрелях) is a rural locality (a selo), the only inhabited locality, and the administrative center of Oktyabrsky Rural Okrug of Gorny District in the Sakha Republic, Russia, located 68 kilometers (42 mi) from Berdigestyakh, the administrative center of the district. Its population as of the 2010 Census was 541, down from 573 recorded during the 2002 Census.
