= Voin (rural locality) =

Voin Воин
- Selo
- Interactive map of Voin
- Location of Voin Voin (Sakha Republic)
- Coordinates: 62°37′20″N 129°58′03″E
- Country: Russia
- Federal subject: Sakha Republic
- Administrative district: Namsky District
- Rural okrugSelsoviet: Khomustakhsky 2-y Rural Okrug

Population (2010 Census)
  - Total: 57
  - Estimate (2021): 27 (−52.6%)

Municipal status
  - Municipal district: Namsky Municipal District
  - Rural settlement: Khomustakhsky 2-y Rural Settlement
- Time zone: UTC+9 (MSK+6)
- Postal code: 678384
- OKTMO ID: 98635466106

Voin (Russian: Во́ин) is a rural locality (a selo) in Khomustakhsky 2-y Rural Okrug of Namsky District in the Sakha Republic, Russia, located 26 kilometers (16 mi) from Namtsy, the administrative center of the district and 5 kilometers (3.1 mi) from Khatas, the administrative center of the rural okrug. Its population as of the 2002 Census was 57.
