= Bulus =

Bulus Булус
- Selo
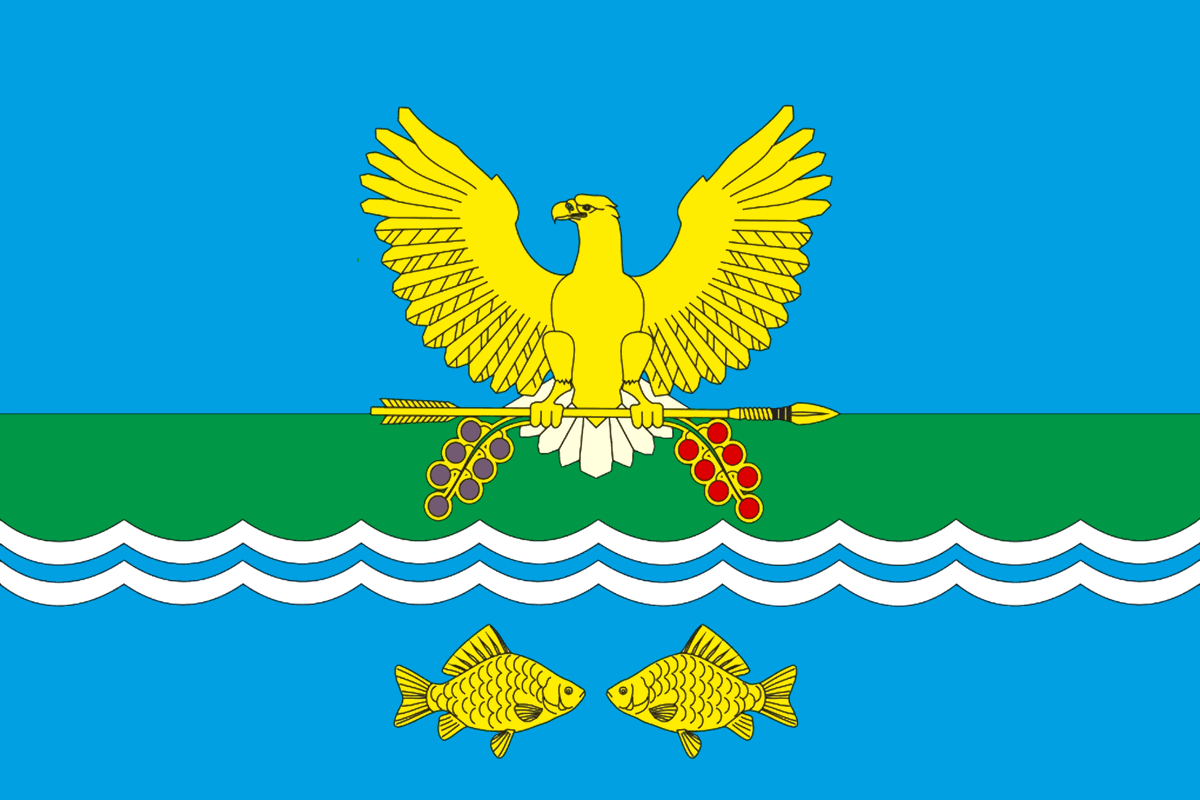
- Flag
- Interactive map of Bulus
- Location of Bulus Bulus (Sakha Republic)
- Coordinates: 63°19′N 129°28′E
- Country: Russia
- Federal subject: Sakha Republic
- Administrative district: Namsky District
- Rural okrugSelsoviet: Tyubinsky Rural Okrug

Population (2010 Census)
  - Total: 408
  - Estimate (2021): 382 (−6.4%)

Administrative status
  - Capital of: Tyubinsky Rural Okrug

Municipal status
  - Municipal district: Namsky Municipal District
  - Rural settlement: Tyubinsky Rural Settlement
  - Capital of: Tyubinsky Rural Settlement
- Time zone: UTC+9 (MSK+6)
- Postal code: 678397
- OKTMO ID: 98635445101

Bulus (Russian: Булус; Yakut: Булуус, Buluus) is a rural locality (a selo), the only inhabited locality, and the administrative center of Tyubinsky Rural Okrug of Namsky District in the Sakha Republic, Russia, located 77 kilometers (48 mi) from Namtsy, the administrative center of the district. Its population as of the 2010 Census was 408, up from 405 recorded during the 2002 Census.
