= Stolby, Namsky District, Sakha Republic =

Stolby Столбы
- Selo
- Interactive map of Stolby
- Location of Stolby Stolby (Sakha Republic)
- Coordinates: 62°59′54″N 129°32′52″E
- Country: Russia
- Federal subject: Sakha Republic
- Administrative district: Namsky District
- Rural okrugSelsoviet: Khatyryksky Rural Okrug

Population (2010 Census)
  - Total: 1,084
  - Estimate (2021): 1,053 (−2.9%)

Administrative status
  - Capital of: Khatyryksky Rural Okrug

Municipal status
  - Municipal district: Namsky Municipal District
  - Rural settlement: Khatyryksky Rural Settlement
  - Capital of: Khatyryksky Rural Settlement
- Time zone: UTC+9 (MSK+6)
- Postal code: 678385
- OKTMO ID: 98635460101

Stolby (Russian: Столбы) is a rural locality (a selo), the only inhabited locality, and the administrative center of Khatyryksky Rural Okrug of Namsky District in the Sakha Republic, Russia, located 35 kilometers (22 mi) from Namtsy, the administrative center of the district. Its population as of the 2010 Census was 1,084, of whom 542 were male and 542 female, up from 960 as recorded during the 2002 Census.
