= Ebya, Gorny District, Sakha Republic =

Ebya Эбя
- Selo
- Interactive map of Ebya
- Location of Ebya Ebya (Sakha Republic)
- Coordinates: 61°52′N 126°38′E
- Country: Russia
- Federal subject: Sakha Republic
- Administrative district: Gorny District
- Rural okrugSelsoviet: Mytakhsky Rural Okrug

Population
  - Estimate (2002): 25 )

Municipal status
  - Municipal district: Gorny Municipal District
  - Rural settlement: Mytakhsky Rural Settlement
- Time zone: UTC+
- Postal code: 678030
- OKTMO ID: 98620440106

Ebya (Russian: Эбя) is a rural locality (a selo) in Mytakhsky Rural Okrug of Gorny District in the Sakha Republic, Russia, located 38 kilometers (24 mi) from Berdigestyakh, the administrative center of the district and 8 kilometers (5.0 mi) from Dikimdya, the administrative center of the rural okrug. Its population as of the 2002 Census was 25.
