= Nikolsky, Sakha Republic =

Nikolsky Никольский
- Selo
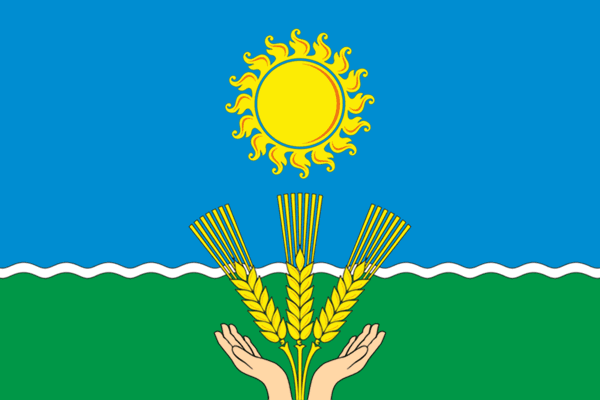
- Flag
- Interactive map of Nikolsky
- Location of Nikolsky Nikolsky (Sakha Republic)
- Coordinates: 62°37′39″N 129°42′48″E
- Country: Russia
- Federal subject: Sakha Republic
- Administrative district: Namsky District
- Rural okrugSelsoviet: Nikolsky Rural Okrug
- Elevation: 23 m (75 ft)

Population (2010 Census)
  - Total: 427
  - Estimate (2021): 453 (+6.1%)

Administrative status
  - Capital of: Nikolsky Rural Okrug

Municipal status
  - Municipal district: Namsky Municipal District
  - Rural settlement: Nikolsky Rural Settlement
  - Capital of: Nikolsky Rural Settlement
- Time zone: UTC+9 (MSK+6)
- Postal code: 678383
- OKTMO ID: 98635432101

Nikolsky (Russian: Никольский) is a rural locality (a selo), the only inhabited locality, and the administrative center of Nikolsky Rural Okrug of Namsky District in the Sakha Republic, Russia, located 12 kilometers (7.5 mi) from Namtsy, the administrative center of the district. Its population as of the 2010 Census was 427, up from 397 recorded during the 2002 Census.
