= Partizan, Sakha Republic =

Partizan Партизан
- Selo
- Interactive map of Partizan
- Location of Partizan Partizan (Sakha Republic)
- Coordinates: 62°35′03″N 129°46′12″E
- Country: Russia
- Federal subject: Sakha Republic
- Administrative district: Namsky District
- Rural okrugSelsoviet: Partizansky Rural Okrug

Population (2010 Census)
  - Total: 937
  - Estimate (2021): 961 (+2.6%)

Administrative status
  - Capital of: Partizansky Rural Okrug

Municipal status
  - Municipal district: Namsky Municipal District
  - Rural settlement: Partizansky Rural Settlement
  - Capital of: Partizansky Rural Settlement
- Time zone: UTC+9 (MSK+6)
- Postal code: 678392
- OKTMO ID: 98635435101

Partizan (Russian: Партизан) is a rural locality (a selo), the only inhabited locality, and the administrative center of Partizansky Rural Okrug of Namsky District in the Sakha Republic, Russia, located 90 kilometers (56 mi) from Namtsy, the administrative center of the district. Its population as of the 2010 Census was 937, of whom 456 were male and 481 female, up from 854 as recorded during the 2002 Census.
