= May, Gorny District, Sakha Republic =

May Май
- Selo
- Interactive map of May
- Location of May May (Sakha Republic)
- Coordinates: 62°02′44″N 126°42′01″E
- Country: Russia
- Federal subject: Sakha Republic
- Administrative district: Gorny District
- Rural okrugSelsoviet: Berdigestyakhsky Rural Okrug

Population (2010 Census)
  - Total: 10
  - Estimate (2021): 8 (−20%)

Administrative status
  - Capital of: Berdigestyakhsky Rural Okrug

Municipal status
  - Municipal district: Gorny Municipal District
  - Rural settlement: Berdigestyakhsky Rural Settlement
  - Capital of: Berdigestyakhsky Rural Settlement
- Time zone: UTC+
- Postal code: 678030
- OKTMO ID: 98620410106

May (Russian: Май; Yakut: Маай, Maay) is a rural locality (a selo), one of two settlements, in addition to Berdigestyakh, in Berdigestyakhsky Rural Okrug of Gorny District in the Sakha Republic, Russia. It is located 7 kilometers (4.3 mi) from Berdigestyakh, the administrative center of the district. Its population as of the 2010 Census was 10, of whom 5 were male and 5 female, down from 13 as recorded during the 2002 Census.
