= Khatas =

Khatas Хатас
- Selo
- Interactive map of Khatas
- Location of Khatas Khatas (Sakha Republic)
- Coordinates: 62°40′56″N 129°55′21″E
- Country: Russia
- Federal subject: Sakha Republic
- Administrative district: Namsky District
- Rural okrugSelsoviet: Khomustakhsky 2-y Rural Okrug

Population
  - Estimate (2002): 637 )

Administrative status
  - Capital of: Khomustakhsky 2-y Rural Okrug

Municipal status
  - Municipal district: Namsky Municipal District
  - Rural settlement: Khomustakhsky 2-y Rural Settlement
  - Capital of: Khomustakhsky 2-y Rural Settlement
- Time zone: UTC+9 (MSK+6)
- Postal code: 678384
- OKTMO ID: 98635466101

Khatas (Russian: Хатас; Yakut: Хатас, Xatas) is a rural locality (a selo), the administrative centre of and one of four settlements, in addition to Voin, Taragay-Byas and Yuner-Olokh, in Khomustakhsky 2-y Rural Okrug of Namsky District in the Sakha Republic, Russia. It is located 18 kilometers (11 mi) from Namtsy, the administrative center of the district. Its population as of the 2002 Census was 637.
