= Ymyyakhtakh =

Ymyyakhtakh Ымыяхтах
- Selo

Other transcription(s)
  - Yakut: Ымыйахтаах
  - Romanisation: Imıyaxtaax
- Interactive map of Ymyyakhtakh
- Location of Ymyyakhtakh Ymyyakhtakh (Sakha Republic)
- Coordinates: 62°27′31″N 129°53′04″E
- Country: Russia
- Federal subject: Sakha Republic
- Administrative district: Namsky District
- Rural okrugSelsoviet: Edeysky Rural Okrug

Population (2010 Census)
  - Total: 1,219
  - Estimate (2021): 1,195 (−2%)

Administrative status
  - Capital of: Edeysky Rural Okrug

Municipal status
  - Municipal district: Namsky Municipal District
  - Rural settlement: Edeysky Rural Settlement
  - Capital of: Edeysky Rural Settlement
- Time zone: UTC+
- Postal code: 678391
- OKTMO ID: 98635415101

Ymyyakhtakh (Russian: Ымыяхтах; Yakut: Ымыйахтаах, Imıyaxtaax) is a rural locality (a selo), the only inhabited locality, and the administrative center of Edeysky Rural Okrug of Namsky District in the Sakha Republic, Russia, located 36 kilometers (22 mi) from Namtsy, the administrative center of the district. Its population as of the 2010 Census was 1,219, of whom 617 were male and 602 female, up from 1,157 as recorded during the 2002 Census. Ymyakhtakh is what English-speakers would call a village.

== Location ==
The village is located within several hundred feet of the Lena River of Siberia, on its western bank. The location is also an archaeological site, associated with the same-named culture, known as the Ymyyakhtakh culture. This was a Chalcolithic culture that had expanded northeastward from the Lake Baikal area in the late second-millennium BCE.
