= Markhachan =

Markhachan Мархачан / Мархачаан
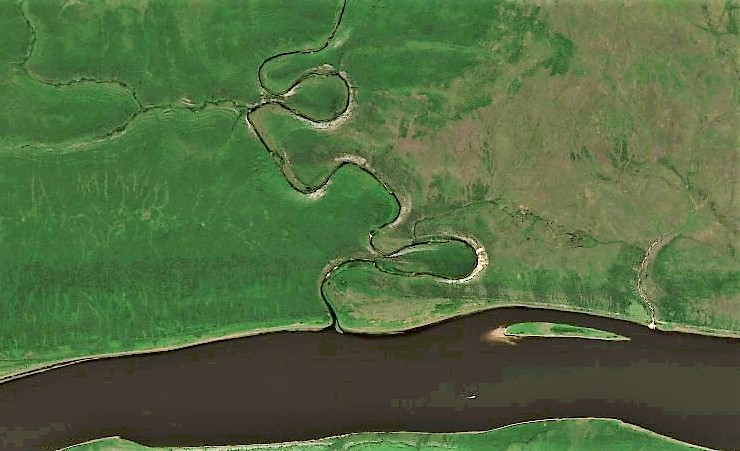
- Mouth of the Markhachan in the Lena Sentinel-2 image.

- Mouth location in Yakutia, Russia

Physical characteristics
- Source
  - location: Lena Plateau
  - coordinates: 61°43′25″N 123°39′24″E
- Mouth: Lena
  - coordinates: 60°36′20″N 123°32′55″E
  - elevation: 112 m (367 ft)
- Length: 248 km (154 mi)
- Basin size: 4,350 km^{2} (1,680 sq mi)

Basin features
- Progression: Lena→ Laptev Sea

The Markhachan (Russian: Мархачан) is a river of Sakha Republic, Russia, a tributary of the Lena. It is 248 kilometres (154 mi) long, and has a drainage basin of 4,350 square kilometres (1,680 sq mi).

The river flows across sparse larch taiga in an uninhabited area of Olyokminsky District. In the International scale of river difficulty the Markhachan is a Class III destination for rafting and kayaking.

== Course ==
The Markhachan has its source in a thermokarst area of the Lena Plateau, near the sources of the Chyna. The river heads mainly southwards along its course, parallel to the Markha in the west. In its last stretch it meanders strongly in the floodplain. Finally it joins the left bank of the Lena 1,914 km (1,189 mi) from its mouth. The Markhachan freezes in the second half of October and stays under ice until the middle of May. There are about 200 small lakes in its basin.

=== Tributaries ===
The largest tributaries of the Markhachan are the 41 km (25 mi) long Somogo from the left, and the 60 km (37 mi) long Magany-Yurekh (Маганы-Юрэх) and the 50 km (31 mi) long Ulakhan-Egeleekh (Улахан-Эгэлээх) from the right.

== Fauna ==
Grayling and lenok are some of the main fish species found in the river.

== See also ==
- List of rivers of Russia
