= Kyureng-At =

Kyureng-At Кюренг-Ат
- Selo
- Interactive map of Kyureng-At
- Location of Kyureng-At Kyureng-At (Sakha Republic)
- Coordinates: 62°43′58″N 129°14′08″E
- Country: Russia
- Federal subject: Sakha Republic
- Administrative district: Namsky District
- Rural okrugSelsoviet: Iskrovsky Rural Okrug

Population (2010 Census)
  - Total: 202
  - Estimate (2021): 202 (0%)

Administrative status
  - Capital of: Iskrovsky Rural Okrug

Municipal status
  - Municipal district: Namsky Municipal District
  - Rural settlement: Iskrovsky Rural Settlement
  - Capital of: Iskrovsky Rural Settlement
- Time zone: UTC+9 (MSK+6)
- Postal code: 678380
- OKTMO ID: 98635417101

Kyureng-At (Russian: Кюренг-Ат; Yakut: Күрэҥ Ат, Küreŋ At) is a rural locality (a selo), the only inhabited locality, and the administrative center of Iskrovsky Rural Okrug of Namsky District in the Sakha Republic, Russia, located 26 kilometers (16 mi) from Namtsy, the administrative center of the district. Its population as of the 2010 Census was 202, of whom 106 were male and 96 female, up from 199 as recorded during the 2002 Census.
