= Orto-Surt =

Orto-Surt Орто-Сурт
- Selo
- Interactive map of Orto-Surt
- Location of Orto-Surt Orto-Surt (Sakha Republic)
- Coordinates: 62°34′N 125°07′E
- Country: Russia
- Federal subject: Sakha Republic
- Administrative district: Gorny District
- Rural okrugSelsoviet: Maganinsky Rural Okrug

Population (2010 Census)
  - Total: 536
  - Estimate (2021): 591 (+10.3%)

Administrative status
  - Capital of: Maganinsky Rural Okrug

Municipal status
  - Municipal district: Gorny Municipal District
  - Rural settlement: Maganinsky Rural Settlement
  - Capital of: Maganinsky Rural Settlement
- Time zone: UTC+
- Postal code: 678034
- OKTMO ID: 98620426101

Orto-Surt (Yakut: Орто Суурт, Orto Suurt; Russian: Орто-Сурт) is a rural locality (a selo), the only inhabited locality, and the administrative center of Maganinsky Rural Okrug of Gorny District in the Sakha Republic, Russia, located 128 kilometers (80 mi) from Berdigestyakh, the administrative center of the district. Its population as of the 2010 Census was 536, up from 516 as recorded during the 2002 Census.
