= Kharyyalakh, Gorny District, Sakha Republic =

Kharyyalakh Харыялах
- Selo
- Interactive map of Kharyyalakh
- Location of Kharyyalakh Kharyyalakh (Sakha Republic)
- Coordinates: 62°07′N 128°21′E
- Country: Russia
- Federal subject: Sakha Republic
- Administrative district: Gorny District
- Rural okrugSelsoviet: Odununsky Rural Okrug

Population
  - Estimate (2002): 7 )

Municipal status
  - Municipal district: Gorny Municipal District
  - Rural settlement: Odununsky Rural Settlement
- Time zone: UTC+
- Postal code: 678030
- OKTMO ID: 98620449111

Kharyyalakh (Yakut: Харыйалаах, Xarıyalaax; Russian: Харыялах) is a rural locality (a selo) in Odununsky Rural Okrug of Gorny District in the Sakha Republic, Russia, located 109 kilometers (68 mi) from Berdigestyakh, the administrative center of the district and 22 kilometers (14 mi) from Magaras, the administrative center of the rural okrug. Its population as of the 2002 Census was 7.
