= Grafsky Bereg =

Grafsky Bereg Графский Берег
- Selo
- Interactive map of Grafsky Bereg
- Location of Grafsky Bereg Grafsky Bereg (Sakha Republic)
- Coordinates: 62°46′N 129°41′E
- Country: Russia
- Federal subject: Sakha Republic
- Administrative district: Namsky District
- SeloSelsoviet: Selo of Grafsky Bereg

Population
  - Estimate (2021): 855 )

Administrative status
  - Capital of: Selo of Grafsky Bereg

Municipal status
  - Municipal district: Namsky Municipal District
  - Rural settlement: Khatyn-Arynsky Rural Settlement
- Time zone: UTC+9 (MSK+6)
- Postal code: 678386
- OKTMO ID: 98635455106

Grafsky Bereg (Russian: Гра́фский Бе́рег; Yakut: Граф Биэрэгэ, Graf Bierege) is a rural locality (a selo) in Namsky District in the Sakha Republic, Russia, located 8 kilometers (5.0 mi) from Namtsy, the administrative center of the district. It used to be a part of Khatyn-Arynsky Rural Okrug, but had since then been separated from it and incorporated as the Selo of Grafsky Bereg, an administrative division equivalent to rural okrugs. Within the framework of municipal divisions, it is a part of Khatyn-Arynsky Rural Settlement in Namsky Municipal District. Its population as of the 2002 Census was 855.
