= Taragay-Byas =

Taragay-Byas Тарагай-Бясь
- Selo
- Interactive map of Taragay-Byas
- Location of Taragay-Byas Taragay-Byas (Sakha Republic)
- Coordinates: 62°40′N 129°58′E
- Country: Russia
- Federal subject: Sakha Republic
- Administrative district: Namsky District
- Rural okrugSelsoviet: Khomustakhsky 2-y Rural Okrug

Population
  - Estimate (2002): 58 )

Municipal status
  - Municipal district: Namsky Municipal District
  - Rural settlement: Khomustakhsky 2-y Rural Settlement
- Time zone: UTC+9 (MSK+6)
- Postal code: 678384
- OKTMO ID: 98635466111

Taragay-Byas (Russian: Тарагай-Бясь; Yakut: Тараҕай Бэс, Tarağay Bes) is a rural locality (a selo) in Khomustakhsky 2-y Rural Okrug of Namsky District in the Sakha Republic, Russia.

It is located 21 kilometers (13 mi) from Namtsy, the administrative center of the district, and 3 kilometers (1.9 mi) from Khatas, the administrative center of the rural okrug. Its population as of the 2002 Census was 58.
