= Kharyyalakh, Namsky District, Sakha Republic =

Kharyyalakh Харыялах
- Selo
- Interactive map of Kharyyalakh
- Location of Kharyyalakh Kharyyalakh (Sakha Republic)
- Coordinates: 63°08′14″N 129°43′40″E
- Country: Russia
- Federal subject: Sakha Republic
- Administrative district: Namsky District
- Rural okrugSelsoviet: Kebekyonsky Rural Okrug
- Elevation: 91 m (299 ft)

Population (2010 Census)
  - Total: 544
  - Estimate (2021): 469 (−13.8%)

Administrative status
  - Capital of: Kebekyonsky Rural Okrug

Municipal status
  - Municipal district: Namsky Municipal District
  - Rural settlement: Kebekyonsky Rural Settlement
  - Capital of: Kebekyonsky Rural Settlement
- Time zone: UTC+9 (MSK+6)
- Postal code: 678387
- OKTMO ID: 98635420101

Kharyyalakh (Russian: Харыялах; Yakut: Харыйалаах, Xarıyalaax) is a rural locality (a selo), the only inhabited locality, and the administrative center of Kebekyonsky Rural Okrug of Namsky District in the Sakha Republic, Russia, located 61 kilometers (38 mi) from Namtsy, the administrative center of the district. Its population as of the 2010 Census was 544, of whom 284 were male and 260 female, up from 526 as recorded during the 2002 Census.
