= Namyldzhylakh =

River in Yakutia, Russia

Namyldzhylakh Намылджылах / Намылдьылаах
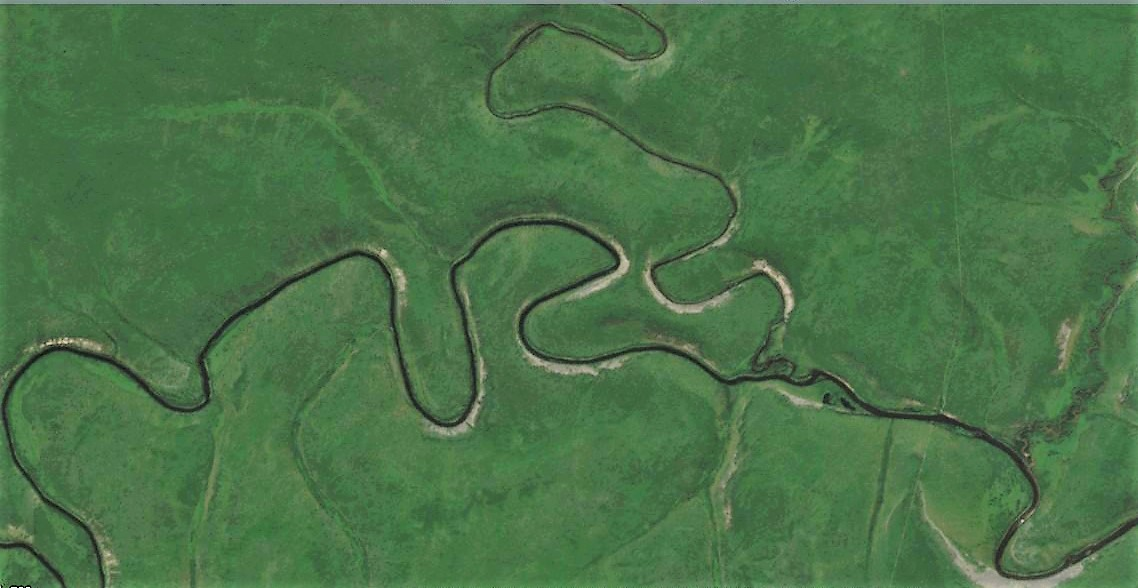
- Confluence of the Namyldzhylakh and the Markha Sentinel-2 image

- Mouth location in Yakutia, Russia

Location
- Country: Russia

Physical characteristics
- Source
  - location: Lena Plateau
- Mouth: Markha
  - location: Verkhnevilyuysky District
  - coordinates: 61°11′11″N 122°44′44″E
- Length: 184 km (114 mi)
- Basin size: 3,560 km^{2} (1,370 sq mi)
- Discharge
  - average: 21 m^{3}/s (740 cu ft/s)

Basin features
- Progression: Markha → Lena→ Laptev Sea

The Namyldzhylakh (Russian: Намылджылах; Yakut: Намылдьылаах, romanized: Namılcılaax) is a river in Yakutia (Sakha Republic), Russia. It is the longest tributary of the Markha, of the Lena basin. Its length is 184 kilometres (114 mi) and its drainage basin area 3,560 square kilometres (1,370 mi^{2}).

== Course ==
The Namyldzhylakh is a right tributary of the Markha. It has its origin in the Lena Plateau. In its upper reaches it heads approximately to the southeast. After it bends eastwards, it stays roughly in that direction all along its course. In its middle course the river meanders strongly within a floodplain containing 90 lakes. Finally it meets the right bank of the Markha 166 kilometres (103 mi) from its mouth in the Lena.

=== Tributaries ===
The largest tributaries of the Namyldzhylakh are the 96 km (60 mi) long Boruu, the 52 km (32 mi) long Toyon-Uyalaakh and the 58 km (36 mi) long Tuoydakh from the left. The river basin is fed by rain and snow. The river freezes in the last half of October and stays under ice until mid May.

== See also ==
- List of rivers of Russia
