= Buotama =

River in Russia

Buotama Yakut: Буотама
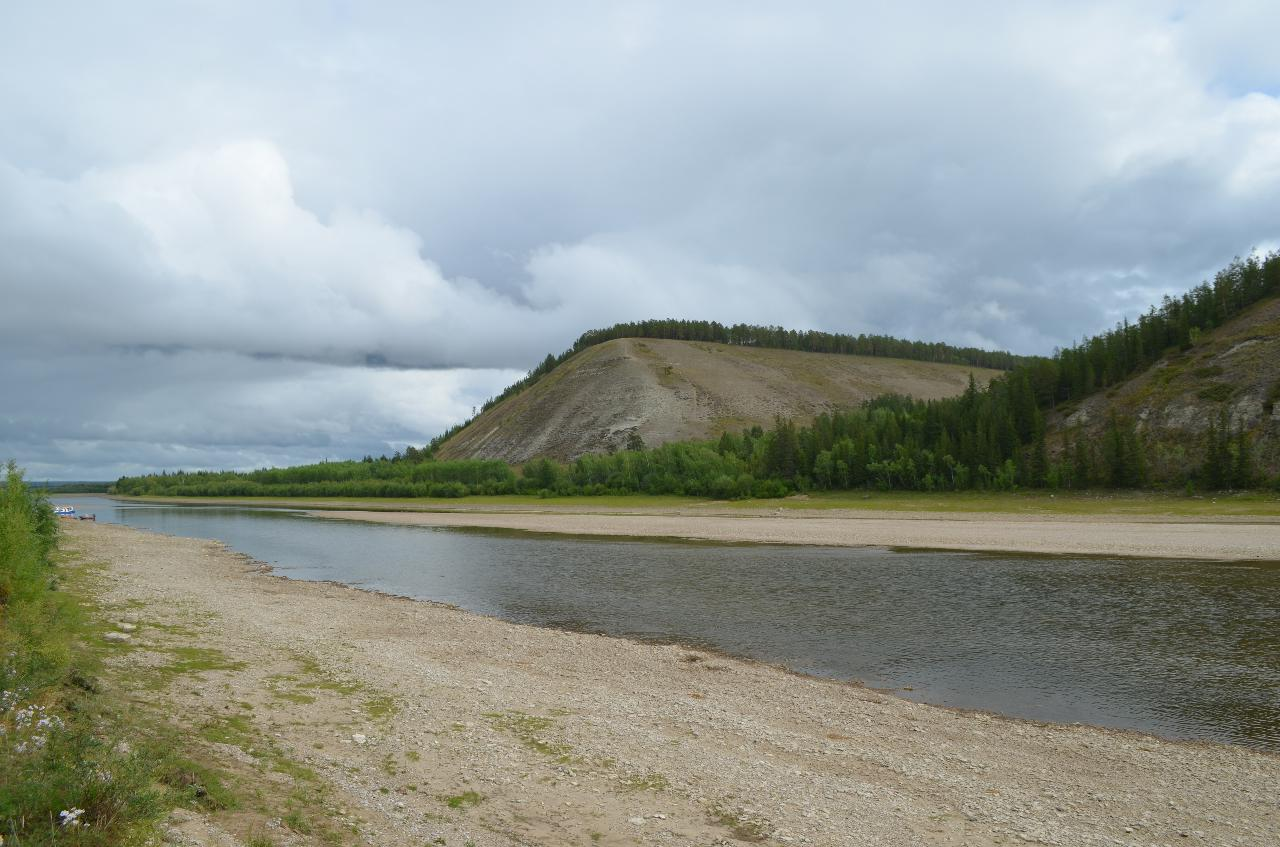
- View of the river

- Location in the Sakha Republic, Russia

Location
- Country: Sakha, Russia

Physical characteristics
- Source
  - location: Aldan Highlands
  - coordinates: 59°57′2″N 124°27′39″E
  - elevation: 500 m (1,600 ft)
- Mouth
  - location: Lena
  - coordinates: 61°15′56″N 128°45′15″E
  - elevation: 93 m (305 ft)
- Length: 418 km (260 mi)
- Basin size: 12,600 km^{2} (4,900 sq mi)
- Discharge
  - average: 43 m^{3}/s (1,500 cu ft/s)

Basin features
- Progression: Lena→ Laptev Sea

The Buotama (Russian: Буотама) is a river in the Sakha Republic, Russia. It is a right tributary of the Lena and has a length of 418 km (260 mi).

There is a nursery of wood bison by the Ust-Buotama Reservoir on the lower reaches of the river. It was opened in 2006 with bison imported from Canada.

== Course ==
The river has its source in the northern part of the Aldan Highlands at an elevation of almost 500 metres (1,600 ft). It flows in an approximately ENE direction roughly parallel to the Lena through a relatively narrow valley by the Lena Plateau. Finally it makes a bend northwards and joins the right bank of the Lena, about 100 km (62 mi) upstream from the capital Yakutsk and 1,609 km (1,000 mi) from the Lena's mouth.

The Buotama freezes between October and November and thaws between the end of April or early May. The river flows across the Olyokminsky and Khangalassky districts.

The Buotama has over 60 tributaries that have a length over 10 km (6.2 mi). The main tributaries are the Kharya-Yuryakh and Kuyuda on the right and the Talalakh on the left. There are about 200 lakes in its basin.

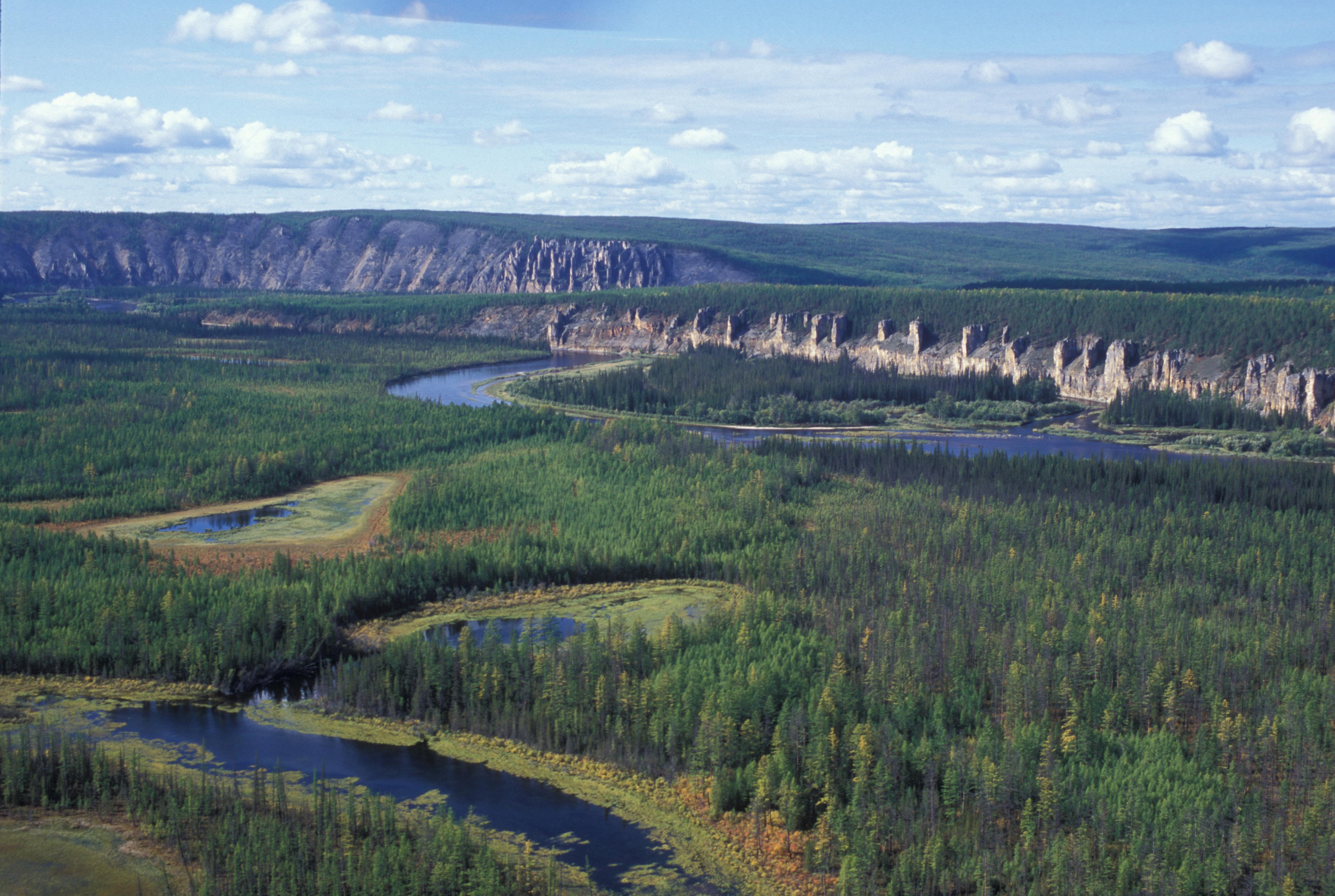
View of the river from above

== See also ==
- List of rivers of Russia
