= Frunze, Sakha Republic =

Frunze Фрунзе
- Selo
- Interactive map of Frunze
- Location of Frunze Frunze (Sakha Republic)
- Coordinates: 63°04′17″N 129°43′44″E
- Country: Russia
- Federal subject: Sakha Republic
- Administrative district: Namsky District
- Rural okrugSelsoviet: Frunzensky Rural Okrug

Population (2010 Census)
  - Total: 155
  - Estimate (2021): 130 (−16.1%)

Administrative status
  - Capital of: Frunzensky Rural Okrug

Municipal status
  - Municipal district: Namsky Municipal District
  - Rural settlement: Frunzensky Rural Settlement
  - Capital of: Frunzensky Rural Settlement
- Time zone: UTC+9 (MSK+6)
- Postal code: 678387
- OKTMO ID: 98635447101

Frunze (Russian: Фру́нзе) is a rural locality (a selo), the only inhabited locality, and the administrative center of Frunzensky Rural Okrug of Namsky District in the Sakha Republic, Russia, located 53 kilometers (33 mi) from Namtsy, the administrative center of the district. Its population as of the 2010 Census was 155, up from 133 as recorded during the 2002 Census.
