= Yert =

Yert Ерт
- Selo
- Interactive map of Yert
- Location of Yert Yert (Sakha Republic)
- Coordinates: 62°01′N 125°48′E
- Country: Russia
- Federal subject: Sakha Republic
- Administrative district: Gorny District
- Rural okrugSelsoviet: Shologonsky Rural Okrug

Population (2010 Census)
  - Total: 544
  - Estimate (2021): 529 (−2.8%)

Administrative status
  - Capital of: Shologonsky Rural Okrug

Municipal status
  - Municipal district: Gorny Municipal District
  - Rural settlement: Shologonsky Rural Settlement
  - Capital of: Shologonsky Rural Settlement
- Time zone: UTC+
- Postal code: 678036
- OKTMO ID: 98620465101

Yert (Yakut: Өрт, Ört; Russian: Ерт) is a rural locality (a selo), the only inhabited locality, and the administrative center of Shologonsky Rural Okrug of Gorny District in the Sakha Republic, Russia, located 80 kilometers (50 mi) from Berdigestyakh, the administrative center of the district. Its population as of the 2010 Census was 544, down from 596 as recorded during the 2002 Census.
