= Byas-Kyuyol, Gorny District, Sakha Republic =

Byas-Kyuyol Бясь-Кюёль
- Selo
- Interactive map of Byas-Kyuyol
- Location of Byas-Kyuyol Byas-Kyuyol (Sakha Republic)
- Coordinates: 62°45′59″N 127°05′55″E
- Country: Russia
- Federal subject: Sakha Republic
- Administrative district: Gorny District
- Rural okrugSelsoviet: Atamaysky Rural Okrug

Population (2010 Census)
  - Total: 673
  - Estimate (2021): 695 (+3.3%)

Administrative status
  - Capital of: Atamaysky Rural Okrug

Municipal status
  - Municipal district: Gorny Municipal District
  - Rural settlement: Atamaysky Rural Settlement
  - Capital of: Atamaysky Rural Settlement
- Time zone: UTC+
- Postal code: 678042
- OKTMO ID: 98620405101

Byas-Kyuyol (Russian: Бясь-Кюёль; Yakut: Бэс Күөл, Bes Küöl) is a rural locality (a selo), the only inhabited locality, and the administrative center of Atamaysky Rural Okrug of Gorny District in the Sakha Republic, Russia, located 100 kilometers (62 mi) from Berdigestyakh, the administrative center of the district. Its population as of the 2010 Census was 673, of whom 345 were male and 328 female, up from 654 as recorded during the 2002 Census.
