= Khatyng-Yuryakh =

River in Yakutia, Russia

Khatyng-Yuryakh Хатынг-Юрях / Хатыҥ Үрэх
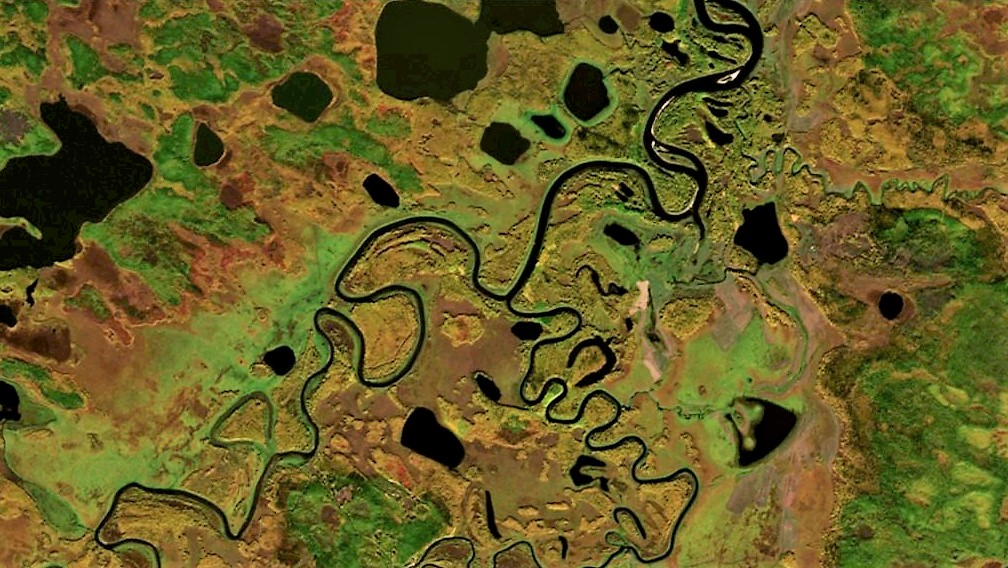
- Confluence of the Lungkha and the Khatyng-Yuryakh Sentinel-2 image

- Mouth location in Yakutia, Russia

Location
- Country: Russia

Physical characteristics
- Source
  - location: Lena Plateau
- Mouth: Lungkha
  - location: Kobyaysky District
  - coordinates: 63°50′58″N 126°35′12″E
- Length: 315 km (196 mi)
- Basin size: 2,570 km^{2} (990 sq mi)

Basin features
- Progression: Lungkha → Lena→ Laptev Sea

The Khatyng-Yuryakh (Russian: Хатынг-Юрях; Yakut: Хатыҥ Үрэх) is a river in Yakutia (Sakha Republic), Russia. It is the longest tributary of the Lungkha, of the Lena basin. Its length is 315 kilometres (196 mi) and its drainage basin area 2,570 square kilometres (990 mi^{2}).

== Course ==
The Khatyng-Yuryakh is a left tributary of the Lungkha. It is formed on the northern fringes of the Lena Plateau. It heads first in an approximately northeastern direction, descending into the Central Yakutian Lowland. In its middle course it bends and flows roughly northwards, strongly meandering within a wide floodplain dotted with numerous lakes. Finally it meets the right bank of the Lungkha 52 kilometres (32 mi) from its mouth in the Lena.

=== Tributaries ===
The largest tributary of the Khatyng-Yuryakh is the 27 km (17 mi) long Chyuyolyu from the right. The river basin is fed by rain and snow. The Khatyng-Yuryakh freezes in mid-October and stays under ice until the second half of May.

Basin of the Lena.

== See also ==
- List of rivers of Russia
