= Appany =

Appany Аппаны
- Selo
- Interactive map of Appany
- Location of Appany Appany (Sakha Republic)
- Coordinates: 62°45′31″N 129°39′34″E
- Country: Russia
- Federal subject: Sakha Republic
- Administrative district: Namsky District
- Rural okrugSelsoviet: Khatyn-Arinsky Rural Okrug

Population
  - Estimate (2021): 2,065 )

Administrative status
  - Capital of: Khatyn-Arinsky Rural Okrug

Municipal status
  - Municipal district: Namsky Municipal District
  - Rural settlement: Khatyn-Arynsky Rural Settlement
  - Capital of: Khatyn-Arynsky Rural Settlement
- Time zone: UTC+9 (MSK+6)
- Postal code: 678388
- OKTMO ID: 98635455101

Appany (Russian: Аппаны; Yakut: Аппааны, Appaanı) is a rural locality (a selo) and the administrative center of Khatyn-Arinsky Rural Okrug of Namsky District in the Sakha Republic, Russia. It is located 5 kilometers (3.1 mi) from Namtsy, the administrative center of the district. Its population as of the 2002 Census was 1,271.
