= Asyma =

Rural locality in Sakha Republic, Russia

Asyma Асыма
- Selo
- Interactive map of Asyma
- Location of Asyma Asyma (Sakha Republic)
- Coordinates: 62°22′N 126°39′E
- Country: Russia
- Federal subject: Sakha Republic
- Administrative district: Gorny District
- Rural okrugSelsoviet: Kirovsky Rural Okrug

Population
  - Estimate (2021): 608 )

Administrative status
  - Capital of: Kirovsky Rural Okrug

Municipal status
  - Municipal district: Gorny Municipal District
  - Rural settlement: Kirovsky Rural Settlement
  - Capital of: Kirovsky Rural Settlement
- Time zone: UTC+
- Postal code: 678033
- OKTMO ID: 98620417101

Asyma (Russian: Асыма; Yakut: Аһыма, Ahıma) is a rural locality (a selo) and the administrative center of Kirovsky Rural Okrug of Gorny District in the Sakha Republic, Russia, located 30 kilometers (19 mi) from Berdigestyakh, the administrative center of the district. Its population as of the 2002 Census was 642.
