= Tumul, Namsky District, Sakha Republic =

Tumul Тумул
- Selo
- Interactive map of Tumul
- Location of Tumul Tumul (Sakha Republic)
- Coordinates: 62°54′18″N 129°36′11″E
- Country: Russia
- Federal subject: Sakha Republic
- Administrative district: Namsky District
- Rural okrugSelsoviet: Modutsky Rural Okrug

Population (2010 Census)
  - Total: 986
  - Estimate (2021): 974 (−1.2%)

Administrative status
  - Capital of: Modutsky Rural Okrug

Municipal status
  - Municipal district: Namsky Municipal District
  - Rural settlement: Modutsky Rural Settlement
  - Capital of: Modutsky Rural Settlement
- Time zone: UTC+9 (MSK+6)
- Postal code: 678389
- OKTMO ID: 98635430101

Tumul (Russian: Тумул; Yakut: Тумул) is a rural locality (a selo), the only inhabited locality, and the administrative center of Modutsky Rural Okrug of Namsky District in the Sakha Republic, Russia, located 22 kilometers (14 mi) from Namtsy, the administrative center of the district. Its population as of the 2010 Census was 986, of whom 487 were male and 499 female, up from 859 as recorded during the 2002 Census.
