= Matta (river) =

Matta Матта / Маатта
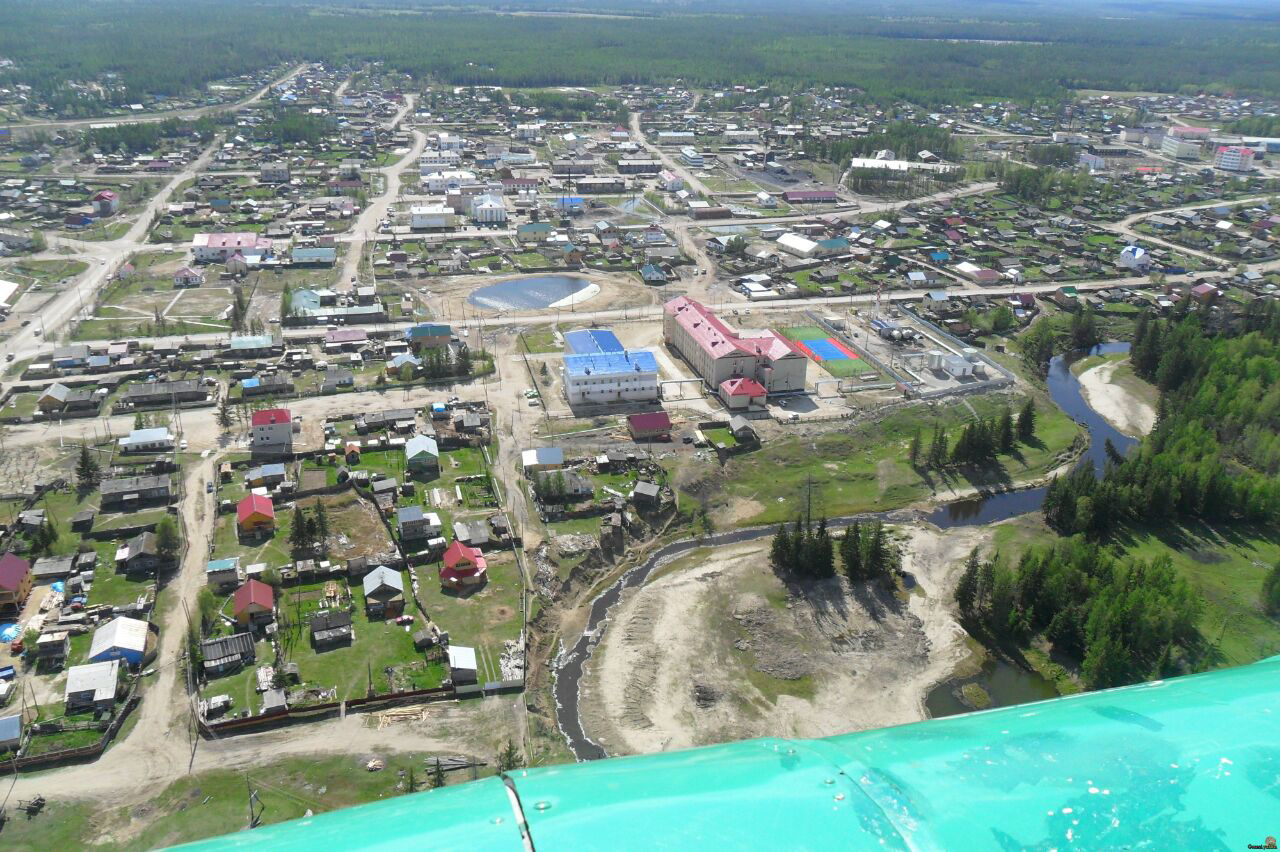
- View of the river on the right at Berdigestyakh

- Location in the Sakha Republic, Russia

Location
- Federal Subject: Yakutia, Russia

Physical characteristics
- Source
  - location: Lena Plateau
  - coordinates: 62°13′32″N 126°59′12″E
- Mouth
  - location: Sinyaya
  - coordinates: 61.5319°N 126.3242°E
  - elevation: 157 m (515 ft)
- Length: 195 km (121 mi)
- Basin size: 4,110 km^{2} (1,590 sq mi)
- Discharge
  - average: 1.19 m^{3}/s (42 cu ft/s)

Basin features
- Progression: Sinyaya→ Lena→ Laptev Sea

The Matta (Russian: Матта; Yakut: Маатта) is a river in the Sakha Republic, Russia. It is a left tributary of the Sinyaya. It is 195 kilometres (121 mi) long, and has a drainage basin of 4,110 square kilometres (1,590 sq mi).

== Course ==
The river begins in the southern area of the Lena Plateau. It flows roughly northeastwards across Gorny District and there are about 300 lakes in its basin. The town of Berdigestyakh, Gorny District, is located by the river. The Matta meets the left bank of the Sinyaya, a tributary of the Lena, 118 km (73 mi) upstream from its mouth. There is also a reservoir on the river that is named after it.

The main tributary of the Matta is the 67 km (42 mi) long Dugda on the left.

Basin of the Lena

== See also ==
- List of rivers of Russia
