= Ura (Lena) =

River in Yakutia (Sakha Republic), Russia

Ura Ура (Каменка-Уксакан)
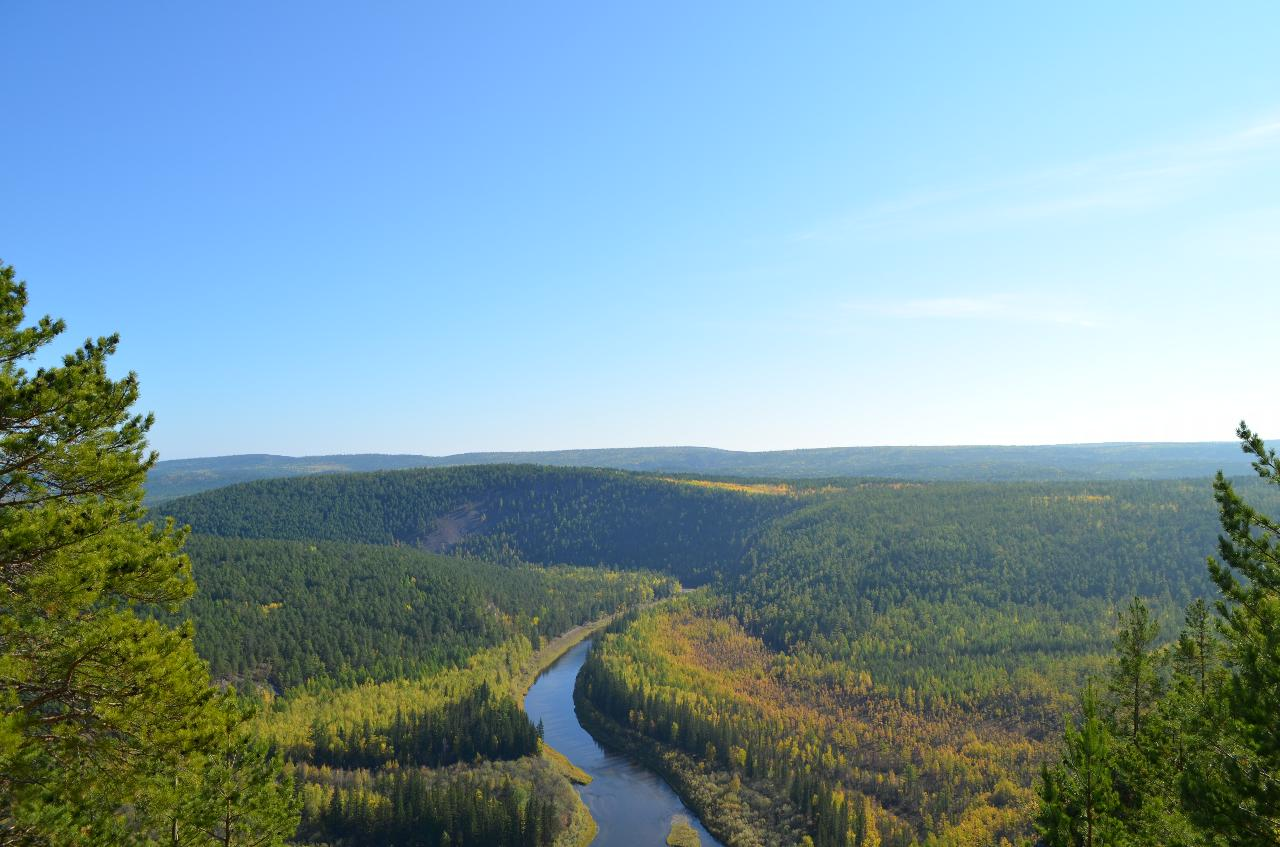
- Landscape of the Ura lower course

- Mouth location in Yakutia, Russia

Location
- Country: Russia

Physical characteristics
- Source
  - location: Lena Plateau
  - coordinates: 61°0′15″N 118°0′30″E
- Mouth: Lena
  - coordinates: 60°15′39″N 117°03′22″E
- Length: 181 km (112 mi)
- Basin size: 2,830 km^{2} (1,090 sq mi)

Basin features
- Progression: Lena→ Laptev Sea

The Ura (Russian: Ура), also known as Kamenka (Russian: Каменка) and Uksakan (Russian: Уксакан), is a river in Yakutia (Sakha Republic), Russia. It is a tributary of the Lena with a length of 181 kilometres (112 mi) and a drainage basin area of 2,830 square kilometres (1,090 mi^{2}).

The river flows across an uninhabited area of the Olyokminsky District.

== Course ==
The Ura is a left tributary of the Lena. It has its sources in the Lena Plateau, to the southeast of the course of the Ergedey, the main tributary of the Derba. The river heads in a roughly southwestern direction across taiga wooded areas with scattered lakes. In its lower course it encounters a hilly area where it first bends west, and then again to the southwest, meeting the Lena 2,366 kilometres (1,470 mi) from its mouth, 29 km (18 mi) southeast of the mouth of the Derba.

The mouth of the Ura, having a picturesque knoll rising above it, is a tourist attraction regularly visited by river cruisers Demyan Bedny and Mikhail Svetlov. The Ura freezes yearly between October and May.

== Fauna ==
Pike, burbot and sander are found in the waters of the Ura.

== See also ==
- List of rivers of Russia
