= Aita Shaposhnikova =

Aita Efimovna Shaposhnikova (Yakut: Аита Ефимовна Шапошникова, romanized: Aita Yefimovna Şapoşnikova) (born 11 September 1957) is a Yakut translator and critic.

== Early life and career ==
Born in Namsky District, Shaposhnikova graduated from the Maxim Gorky Literature Institute in 1979, whereupon she began her career as an editor for various magazines; she held positions at Hotugu Sulus, Polar Star, and Chuoraanchyk. In 1994 she became the executive secretary of the magazine Dalar Hotun. Her first translations from the Yakut language appeared in Polar Star in 1979; in 1981 she published her first translated book. She has continued to produce translations which have appeared in various periodicals and anthologies. As a literary critic she has written and published on the subject of modern Yakut literature, including biographies of Yakut writers. She has translated work from Russian into Yakut language, and has also translated the work of Yakut writers into Russian language. She has also produced a translation of the Epistles of Paul into Yakut. She has received awards for her work.
