= Markha (Lena) =

Markha Марха
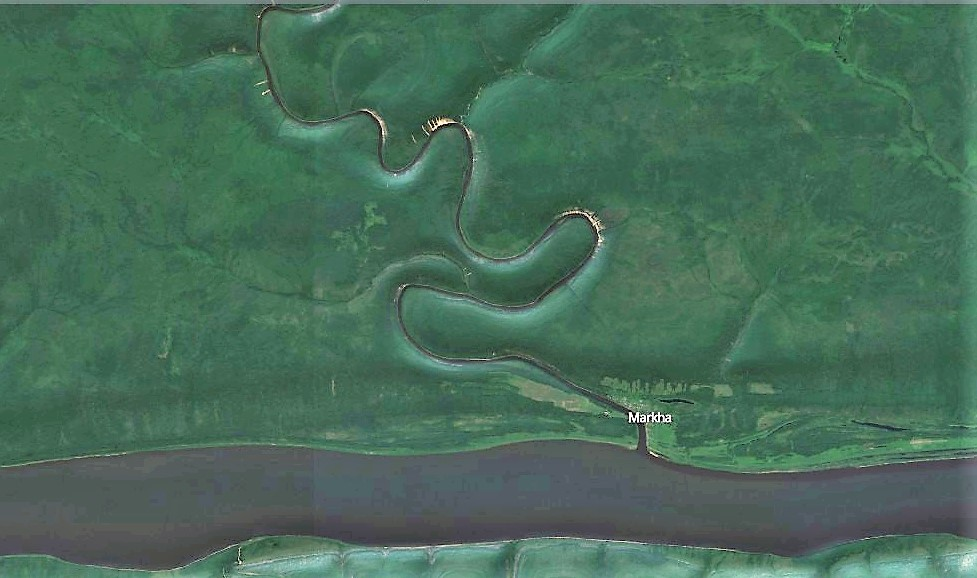
- Mouth of the Markha in the Lena Sentinel-2 image.

- Mouth location in Yakutia, Russia Markha (Lena) (Russia)

Physical characteristics
- Source
  - location: Lena Plateau
  - coordinates: 61°59′44″N 122°00′16″E
- Mouth: Lena
  - coordinates: 60°35′12″N 123°17′21″E
  - elevation: 112 m (367 ft)
- Length: 346 km (215 mi)
- Basin size: 8,910 km^{2} (3,440 sq mi)
- Discharge
  - average: 21 m^{3}/s (740 cu ft/s)

Basin features
- Progression: Lena→ Laptev Sea

The Markha (Russian: Марха) is a river of Sakha Republic, Russia, a tributary of the Lena. It is 346 kilometres (215 mi) long, and has a drainage basin of 8,910 square kilometres (3,440 sq mi).

== Course ==
It has its source in a small lake of the Lena Plateau and flows across a further five small lakes in its upper reaches. The Markha heads mainly towards the SSE along its course, parallel to the Markhachan in the east. Towards its final stretch it bends southeastwards and joins the left bank of the Lena 1,928 km (1,198 mi) from its mouth. The river freezes in the second half of October and stays under ice until the middle of May. There are about 800 lakes in its basin.

=== Tributaries ===
The largest tributary of the Markha is the 184 km (114 mi) long Namyldzhylakh from the right.

== See also ==
- List of rivers of Russia
