= Sinyaya (Lena) =

River in Yakutia, Russia

Sinyaya Yakut: Сиинэ
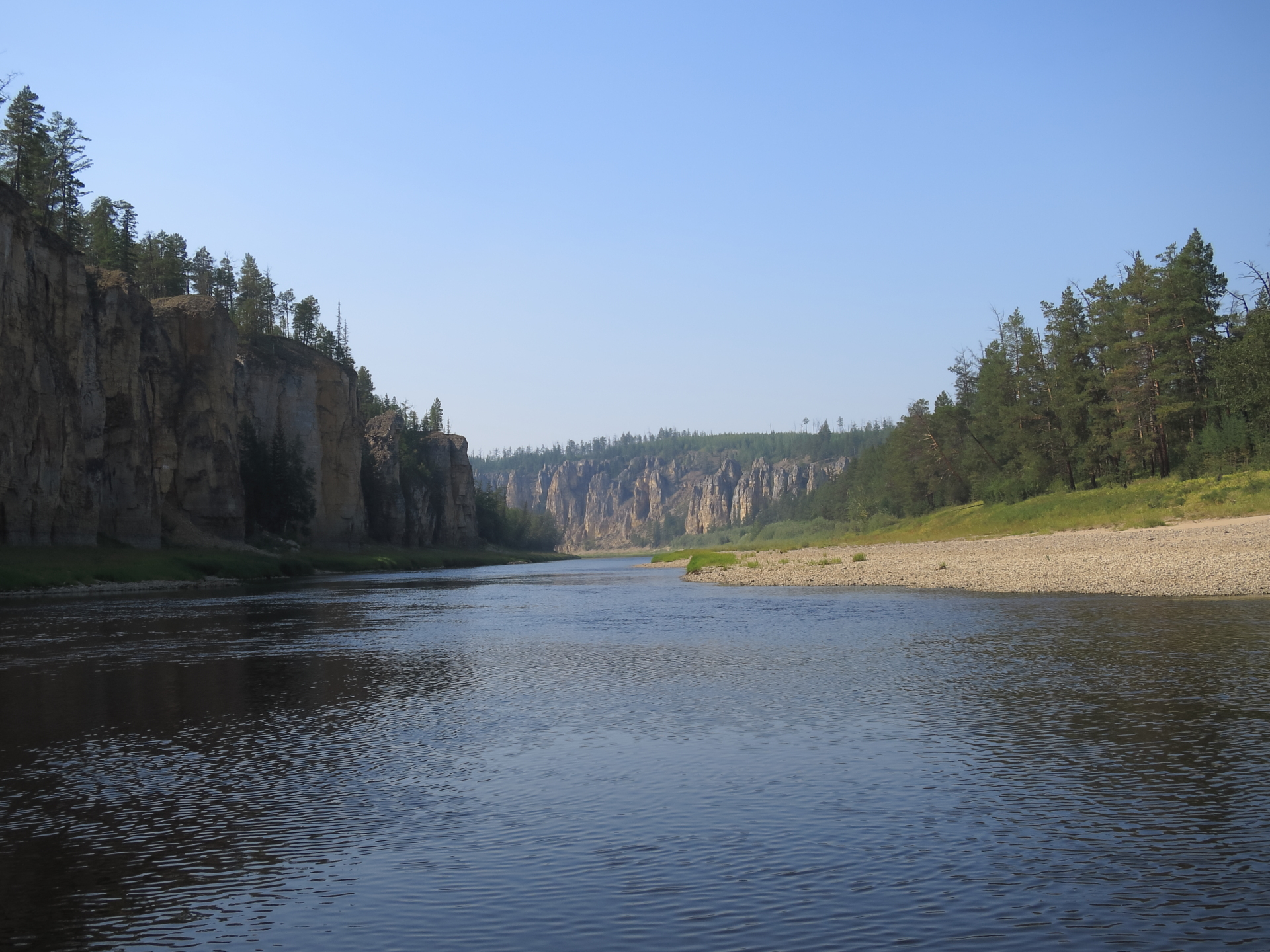
- View of the river

- Location in the Sakha Republic, Russia

Location
- Country: Sakha, Russia

Physical characteristics
- Source
  - location: Lena Plateau
  - coordinates: 62°15′16″N 121°39′21″E
  - elevation: 278 m (912 ft)
- Mouth
  - location: Lena
  - coordinates: 61°6′53″N 126°55′50″E
- Length: 597 km (371 mi)
- Basin size: 30,900 km^{2} (11,900 sq mi)
- Discharge
  - average: 42 m^{3}/s (1,500 cu ft/s)

Basin features
- Progression: Lena→ Laptev Sea

The Sinyaya (Russian: Синяя; Yakut: Сиинэ, Siine) is a river in the Sakha Republic, Russia. It is a left tributary of the Lena. It is 597 kilometres (371 mi) long, and has a drainage basin of 30,900 square kilometres (11,900 sq mi).

== Course ==
The river begins in the Tampa-Ottoowo, a small lake located in the Lena Plateau at an elevation of 278 metres (912 ft). It flows roughly southeastwards and there are about 3,300 lakes in its basin. In its lower course the river is flanked by picturesque rock formations, the Sinyaya Pillars. The Sinyaya meets the left bank of the Lena near Sinsk, 150 km (93 mi) upstream from Yakutsk and 1,716 km (1,066 mi) from the Lena's mouth.

The Sinyaya freezes between October and May. From the end of May to June it flows at a high level owing to the melting of snow and the flow recedes in the summer. The area of the river basin is largely uninhabited. The river flows across three districts, Verkhnevilyuy, Gorny and Khangalassky.

=== Tributaries ===
The main tributaries of the Sinyaya are the 175 kilometres (109 mi) long Khangdaryma, the 90 kilometres (56 mi) long Appaya and the 240 kilometres (150 mi) long Chyna on the right and the 195 kilometres (121 mi) long Matta, the 98 kilometres (61 mi) long Mekele, the 181 kilometres (112 mi) long Chyra and the 152 kilometres (94 mi) long Nuoraldyma on the left.

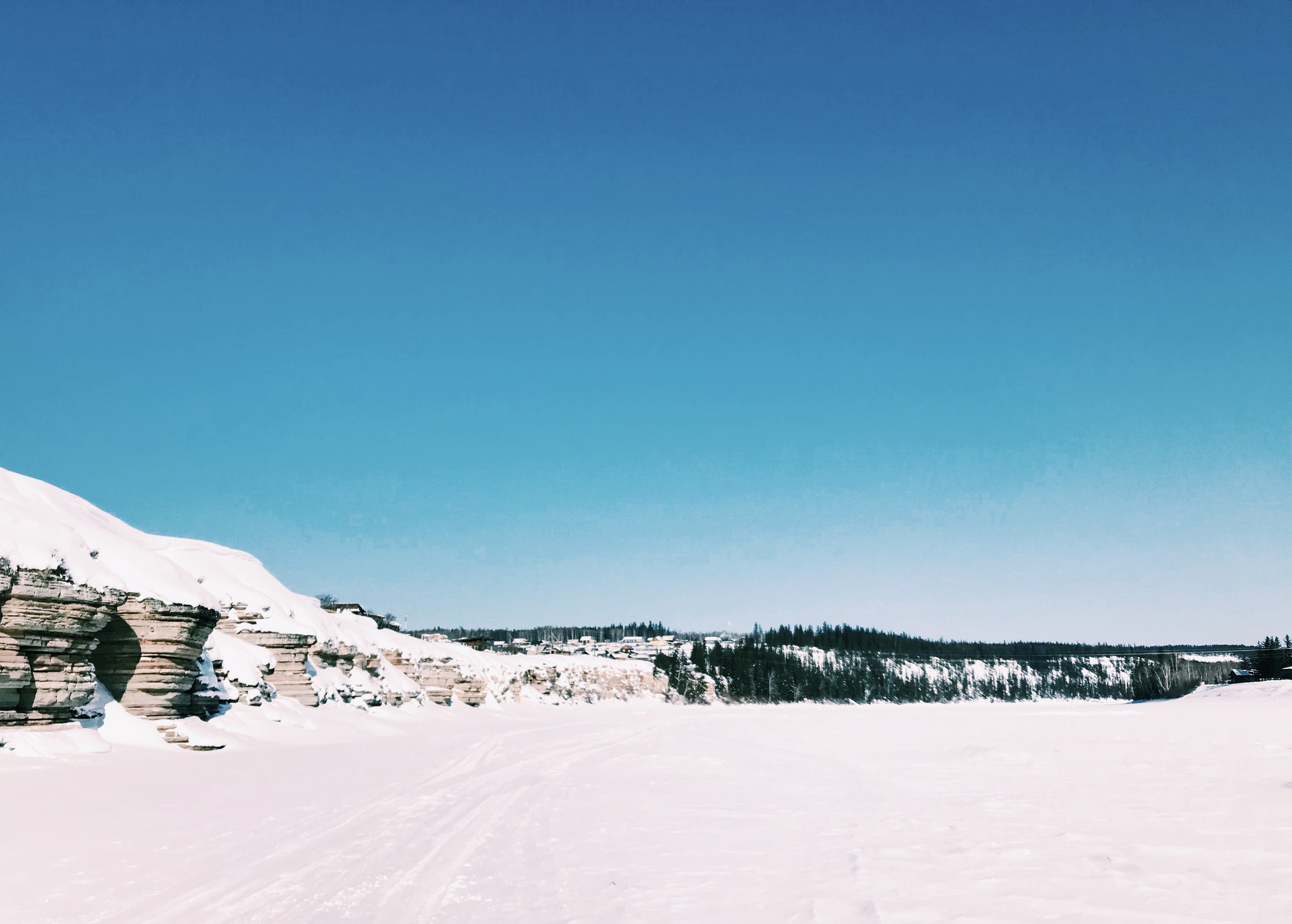
View of the river in the winter

== See also ==
- List of rivers of Russia
