= Kysyl-Syr, Namsky District, Sakha Republic =

Kysyl-Syr Кысыл-Сыр
- Selo
- Interactive map of Kysyl-Syr
- Location of Kysyl-Syr Kysyl-Syr (Sakha Republic)
- Coordinates: 62°32′N 129°45′E
- Country: Russia
- Federal subject: Sakha Republic
- Administrative district: Namsky District
- Rural okrugSelsoviet: Khomustakhsky 1-y Rural Okrug

Population (2010 Census)
  - Total: 1,502
  - Estimate (2021): 1,647 (+9.7%)

Administrative status
  - Capital of: Khomustakhsky 1-y Rural Okrug

Municipal status
  - Municipal district: Namsky Municipal District
  - Rural settlement: Khomustakhsky 1-y Rural Settlement
  - Capital of: Khomustakhsky 1-y Rural Settlement
- Time zone: UTC+9 (MSK+6)
- Postal code: 678393
- OKTMO ID: 98635465101

Kysyl-Syr (Russian: Кысыл-Сыр; Yakut: Кыһыл Сыыр, Kıhıl Sıır) is a rural locality (a selo), the only inhabited locality, and the administrative center of Khomustakhsky 1-y Rural Okrug of Namsky District in the Sakha Republic, Russia, located 22 kilometers (14 mi) from Namtsy, the administrative center of the district. Its population as of the 2010 Census was 1,502, up from 1,351 recorded during the 2002 Census.
