= Frunze, Iglinsky District, Republic of Bashkortostan =

Frunze Фрунзе
- Village
- Location within Bashkortostan Location within Russia
- Coordinates: 54°41′N 56°26′E
- Country: Russia
- Region: Bashkortostan
- District: Iglinsky District
- Time zone: UTC+5:00

Frunze (Russian: Фрунзе) is a rural locality (a village) in Kaltymanovsky Selsoviet, Iglinsky District, Bashkortostan, Russia. The population was 163 as of 2010. There are 5 streets.

== Geography ==
Frunze is located 20 km south of Iglino (the district's administrative centre) by road. Kaltymanovo is the nearest rural locality.
