= Frunze, Tuymazinsky District, Republic of Bashkortostan =

Frunze Фрунзе
- Selo
- Location within Bashkortostan Location within Russia
- Coordinates: 54°20′N 53°43′E
- Country: Russia
- Region: Bashkortostan
- District: Tuymazinsky District
- Time zone: UTC+5:00

Frunze (Russian: Фрунзе) is a rural locality (a selo) in Verkhnetroitsky Selsoviet, Tuymazinsky District, Bashkortostan, Russia. Its population was 241 as of 2010 and it has 3 streets.

== Geography ==
Frunze is located 35 km (22 mi) south of Tuymazy (the district's administrative centre) by road. Nizhnetroitsky is the nearest rural locality.
