= Lena Plateau =

- Приленское плато Өлүөнэтээҕи хаптал хайалаах сир
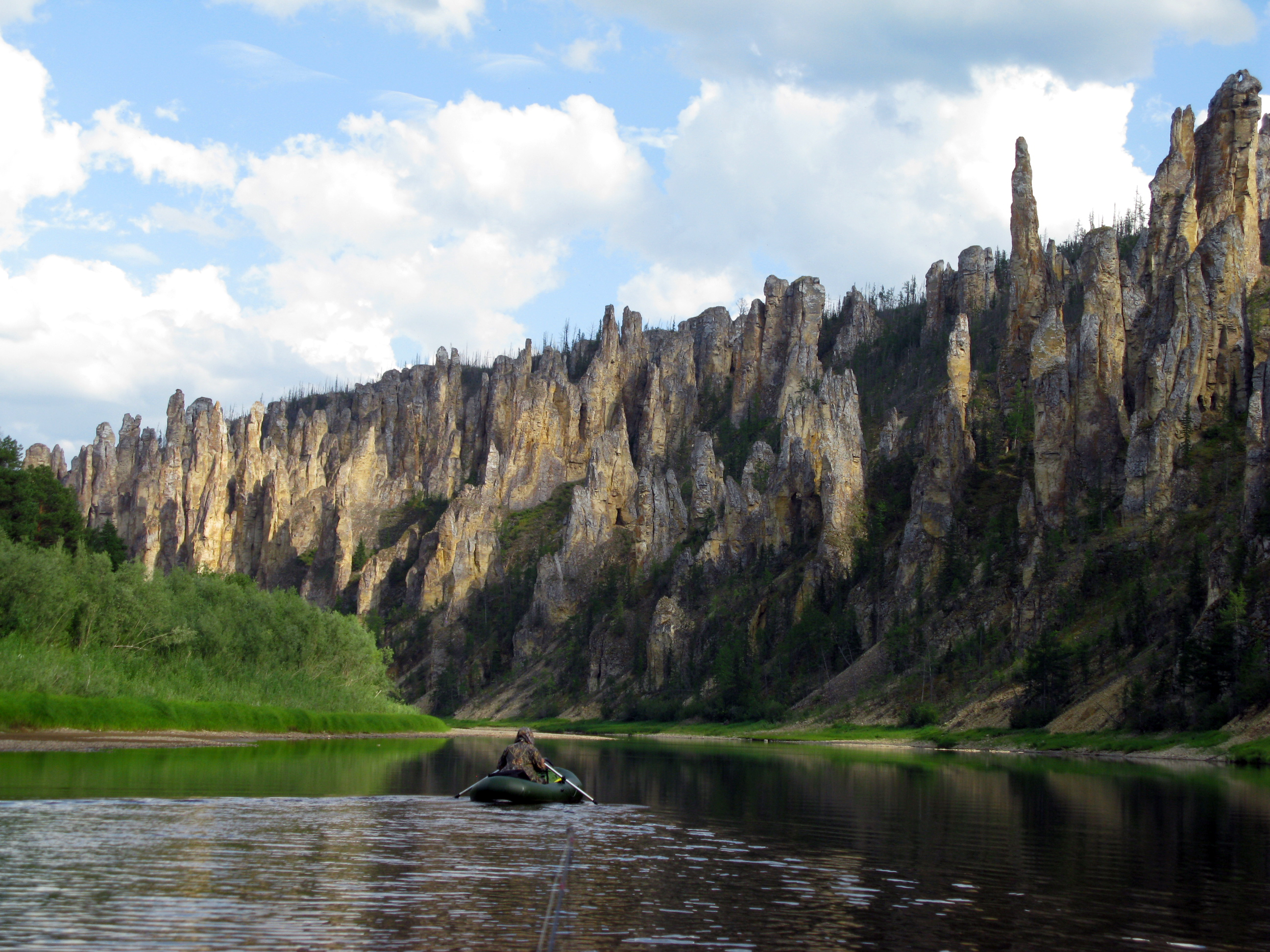
- View of the Sinyaya Pillars in the plateau

Highest point
- Elevation: 700 m (2,300 ft)

Dimensions
- Length: 1,000 km (620 mi)
- Width: 200 km (120 mi)

Geography
- Location within Far Eastern Federal District
- Country: Russia
- Federal subject: Yakutia, Irkutsk Oblast
- Range coordinates: 60°45′N 125°0′E
- Parent range: Central Siberian Plateau

Geology
- Rock ages: Cambrian and Ordovician
- Rock type(s): Limestone, dolomite, sandstone

The Lena Plateau, also known as Prilensky Plateau (Russian: Приленское плато, romanized: Prilenskoye Plato; Yakut: Өлүөнэтээҕи хаптал хайалаах сир, romanized: Ölüönetêği xaptal xayalâx sir), is one of the great plateaus of Siberia. Administratively it is mostly within the Sakha Republic (Yakutia), with a small sector in the Irkutsk Oblast, Far Eastern Federal District, Russia. The plateau is named after the Lena River, which flows across it.

== Protected areas ==
There are spectacularly eroded rock formations composed of gypsum-bearing and saline limestone, dolomite and, in some places sandstone, in different spots of the plateau. The Lena Pillars, lining the banks of river Lena in the region, are the most well-known of these features. They were declared a UNESCO World Heritage Site in 2012. Other protected areas in the plateau are the Sinyyaya Pillars by river Sinyaya, and the Turuuk Khaya Rocks by the Lyutenge River. The Olyokma Nature Reserve is located on the eastern side, partly within neighboring Aldan Highlands.

== Geography ==
The Lena Plateau is located in the southern Sakha Republic, between the Lower Tunguska River in the west and the Amga River in the east. It extends roughly to the north along the left bank of the Lena River for more than 1,000 kilometers (620 mi) with an average width of 200 kilometers (120 mi). The Central Siberian Plateau, is located to the northwest and the Central Yakutian Lowland to the north. To the south, beyond the Aldan, rise the Olyokma-Chara Plateau and the Aldan Highlands.

The average height of the Lena Plateau surface is between 450 meters (1,480 ft) and 500 meters (1,600 ft). Elevations become slightly higher towards the south of the plateau, reaching a maximum height of 700 metres (2,300 ft) at an unnamed summit. The plateau is located in a permafrost zone where the soil freezes down to hundreds of meters.

The Lena Plateau occupies a very large area, including parts of the districts of Mirny, Suntar, Verkhnevilyuy, Gorny, Khangalassky, Megino-Kangalassky, Lensky, Olyokmin, Amgin and Aldan in the Sakha Republic, as well as parts of Katanga and Bodaybin districts in the Irkutsk Oblast.

=== Hydrography ===
The Namana, Keyikte, Buotama, Menda, Suola, Kenkeme, Bappagay, Tonguo, Botomoyu, Kempendyay, Tatta, Tamma, Peleduy, Nyuya, Pilyuda, Ichera, Chona, Sinyaya, Chyna, Markha, Namyldzhylakh, Lungkha, Khatyng-Yuryakh, Tyugyuene, Ulakhan-Botuobuya, Malaya Botuobuya, Matta, Biryuk, Cherendey, Ura, Sitte and Lyutenge are some of the watercourses having their source in the plateau.

== Flora and climate ==
There are taiga forests made up mostly of pine and larch in the higher areas. Wetlands and meadows are common in the river valleys cutting across the plateau.

The plateau is characterized by a harsh continental climate, with long cold winters and sparse amounts of snow. In winter the temperature may drop to −45 °C (−49 °F), and sometimes even down to −60 °C (−76 °F). Summers are moderately warm with temperatures reaching 15 °C (59 °F) to 17 °C (63 °F). Precipitation is between 350 millimeters (14 in) and 450 millimeters (18 in) per year. Most of the yearly precipitation falls in the summer in the form of rain.

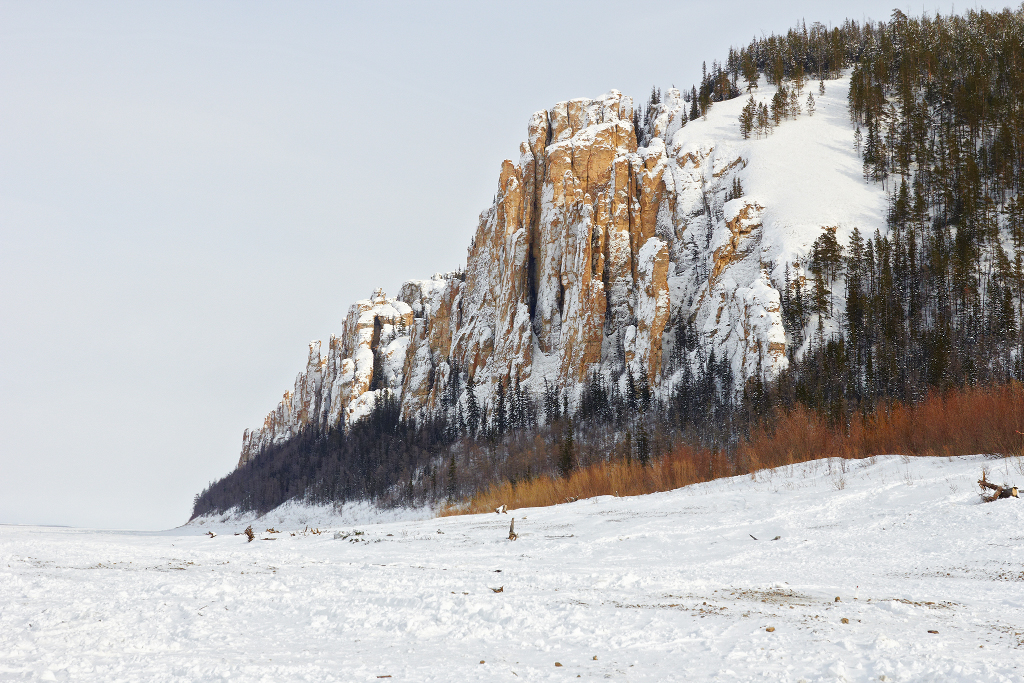
Cliffs by the Lena and sparse forest in the winter

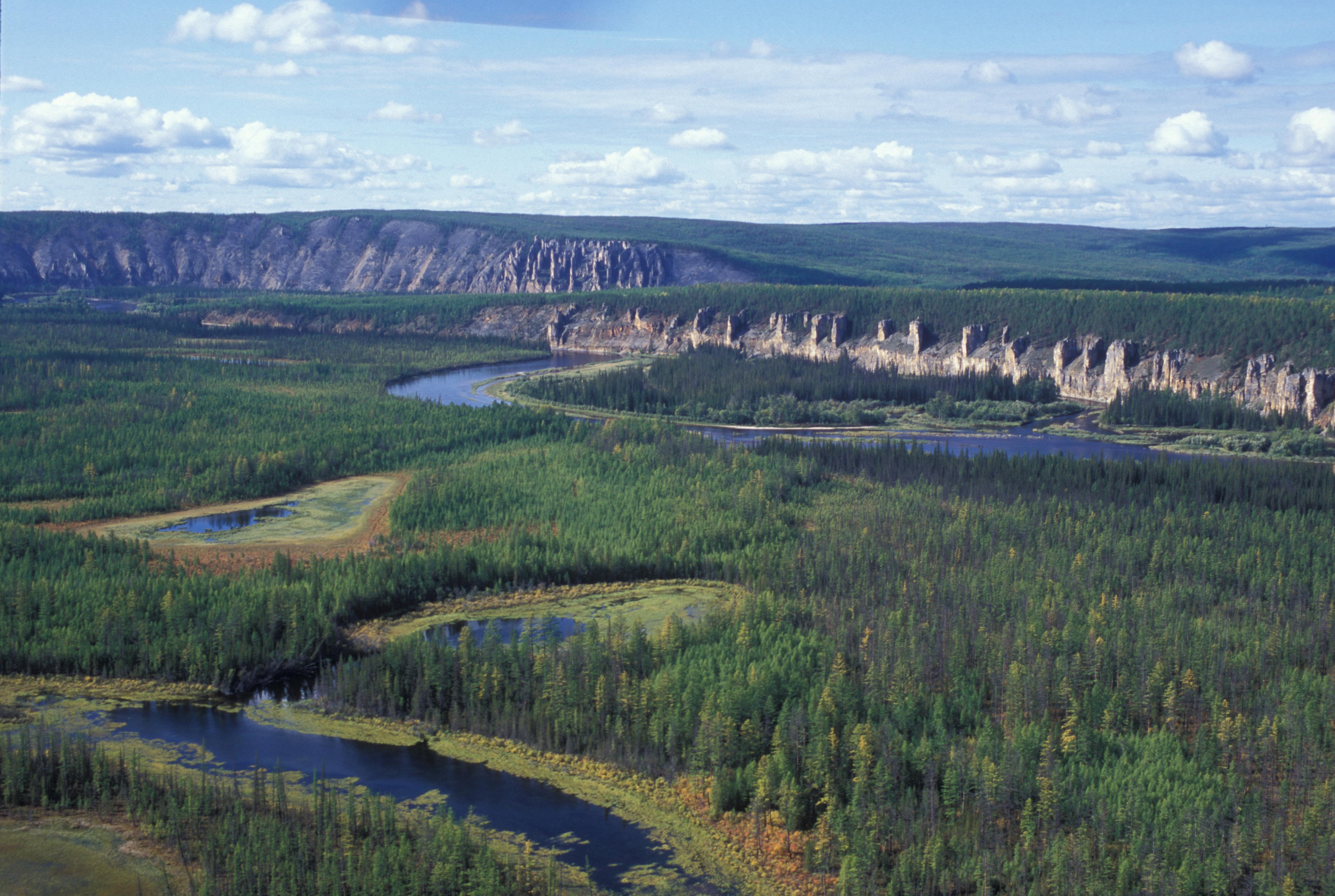
Buotama River Valley

== See also ==
- Geography of Russia § Topography and drainage
- Patom Highlands
