= Frunze, Burayevsky District, Republic of Bashkortostan =

Frunze Фрунзе
- Village
- Location within Bashkortostan Location within Russia
- Coordinates: 55°41′N 55°45′E
- Country: Russia
- Region: Bashkortostan
- District: Burayevsky District
- Time zone: UTC+5:00

Frunze (Russian: Фрунзе) is a rural locality (a village) in Kashkalevsky Selsoviet, Burayevsky District, Bashkortostan, Russia. The population was 28 as of 2010. There is 1 street.

The name seems to have Romanian or Moldovan origins, the word "Frunze", meaning "Leaves"

== Geography ==
Frunze is located 42 km southeast of Burayevo (the district's administrative centre) by road. Lenin-Bulyak is the nearest rural locality.
