= Dikimdya, Gorny District, Sakha Republic =

Dikimdya Дикимдя
- Selo
- Interactive map of Dikimdya
- Location of Dikimdya Dikimdya (Sakha Republic)
- Coordinates: 61°54′N 126°33′E
- Country: Russia
- Federal subject: Sakha Republic
- Administrative district: Gorny District
- Rural okrugSelsoviet: Mytakhsky Rural Okrug

Population
  - Estimate (2002): 617 )

Administrative status
  - Capital of: Mytakhsky Rural Okrug

Municipal status
  - Municipal district: Gorny Municipal District
  - Rural settlement: Mytakhsky Rural Settlement
  - Capital of: Mytakhsky Rural Settlement
- Time zone: UTC+
- Postal code: 678037
- OKTMO ID: 98620440101

Dikimdya (Russian: Дикимдя; Yakut: Дьиикимдэ, romanized: Ciikimde) is a rural locality (a selo) and the administrative center of Mytakhsky Rural Okrug of Gorny District in the Sakha Republic, Russia, located 30 kilometers (19 mi) from Berdigestyakh, the administrative center of the district. Its population as of the 2002 Census was 617.
