= Keptin =

Keptin Кептин
- Selo
- Interactive map of Keptin
- Location of Keptin Keptin (Sakha Republic)
- Coordinates: 62°20′N 124°27′E
- Country: Russia
- Federal subject: Sakha Republic
- Administrative district: Gorny District
- Rural okrugSelsoviet: Maltaninsky Rural Okrug

Population (2010 Census)
  - Total: 659
  - Estimate (2021): 612 (−7.1%)

Administrative status
  - Capital of: Maltaninsky Rural Okrug

Municipal status
  - Municipal district: Gorny Municipal District
  - Rural settlement: Maltaninsky Rural Settlement
  - Capital of: Maltaninsky Rural Settlement
- Time zone: UTC+
- Postal code: 678035
- OKTMO ID: 98620433101

Keptin (Yakut: Кэптин, Russian: Кептин) is a rural locality (a selo) and the administrative center of Maltaninsky Rural Okrug of Gorny District in the Sakha Republic, Russia, located 188 kilometers (117 mi) from Berdigestyakh, the administrative center of the district. Its population as of the 2010 Census was 659; down from 685 recorded in the 2002 Census.
