= Magaras =

Magaras Магарас
- Selo
- Interactive map of Magaras
- Location of Magaras Magaras (Sakha Republic)
- Coordinates: 62°09′N 128°04′E
- Country: Russia
- Federal subject: Sakha Republic
- Administrative district: Gorny District
- Rural okrugSelsoviet: Odununsky Rural Okrug

Population
  - Estimate (2002): 910 )

Administrative status
  - Capital of: Odununsky Rural Okrug

Municipal status
  - Municipal district: Gorny Municipal District
  - Rural settlement: Odununsky Rural Settlement
  - Capital of: Odununsky Rural Settlement
- Time zone: UTC+
- Postal code: 678041
- OKTMO ID: 98620449101

Magaras (Yakut: Маҥырас, Maŋıras; Russian: Магарас) is a rural locality (a selo) and the administrative center of Odununsky Rural Okrug of Gorny District in the Sakha Republic, Russia, located 87 kilometers (54 mi) from Berdigestyakh, the administrative center of the district. Its population as of the 2002 Census was 910.
