= Gorny District =

Gorny District Горный улус (Russian)
- District

Other transcription(s)
  - Sakha: Горнай улууһа
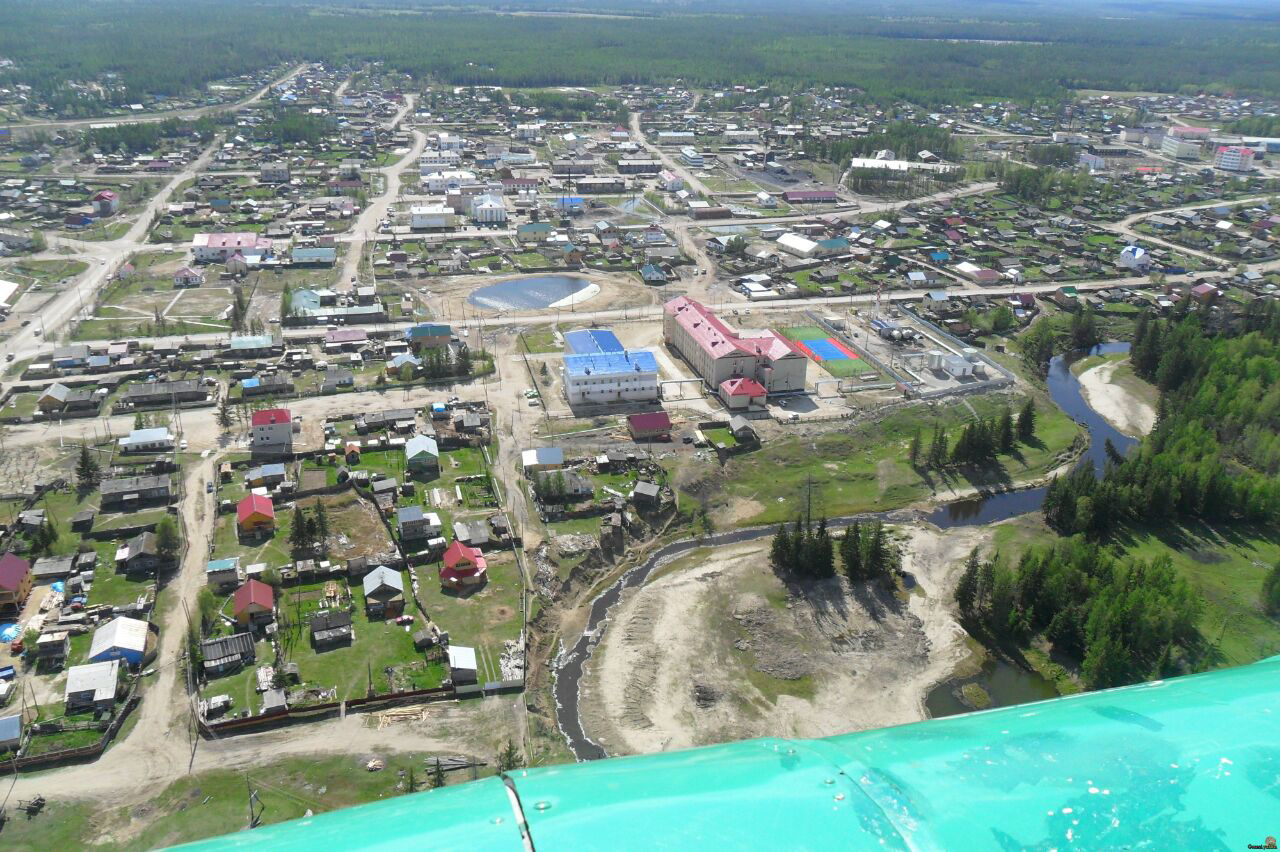
- Berdigestyakh, on the Maatta River

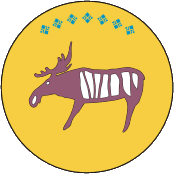
- Flag Coat of arms
- Location of Gorny District in the Sakha Republic
- Coordinates: 62°06′N 126°42′E
- Country: Russia
- Federal subject: Sakha Republic
- Established: June 25, 1931
- Administrative center: Berdigestyakh

Area
  - Total: 45,600 km^{2} (17,600 sq mi)

Population (2010 Census)
  - Total: 11,706
  - Density: 0.257/km^{2} (0.665/sq mi)
  - Urban: 0%
  - Rural: 100%

Administrative structure
  - Administrative divisions: 9 Rural okrugs
  - Inhabited localities: 1 urban-type settlements, 16 rural localities

Municipal structure
  - Municipally incorporated as: Gorny Municipal District
  - Municipal divisions: 0 urban settlements, 9 rural settlements
- Time zone: UTC+
- OKTMO ID: 98620000

Population of Gorny District
- 2010 Census: 11,706
- 2002 Census: 11,422
- 1989 Census: 10,034
- 1979 Census: 7,977

Gorny District (Russian: Го́рный улу́с; Yakut: Горнай улууһа, Gornay uluuha) is an administrative and municipal district (raion, or ulus), one of the thirty-four in the Sakha Republic, Russia. It is located in the center of the republic and borders Vilyuysky and Kobyaysky Districts in the north, Namsky District and the territory of the city of republic significance of Yakutsk in the east, Khangalassky District in the south, Olyokminsky District in the southwest, and Verkhnevilyuysky District in the west. The area of the district is 45,600 square kilometers (17,600 sq mi). Its administrative center is the rural locality (a selo) of Berdigestyakh. As of the 2010 Census, the total population of the district was 11,706, with the population of Berdigestyakh accounting for 55.2% of that number.

== Geography ==
The main rivers in the district are the Sinyaya, Chyna, Kenkeme, Khanchaly, Tyugyuene, Matta and Sitte, all of which are tributaries of the Lena.

=== Climate ===
Average January temperature ranges from −36 °C (−33 °F) in the west to −40 °C (−40 °F) in the east and average July temperature is +16–+17 °C (61–63 °F). Average annual precipitation is 200–250 millimeters (7.9–9.8 in).

== History ==
The district was established on June 25, 1931.

== Administrative and municipal status ==
Within the framework of administrative divisions, Gorny District is one of the thirty-four in the republic. The district is divided into nine rural okrugs (naslegs) which comprise sixteen rural localities. As a municipal division, the district is incorporated as Gorny Municipal District. Its nine rural okrugs are incorporated into nine rural settlements within the municipal district. The selo of Berdigestyakh serves as the administrative center of both the administrative and municipal district.

== Inhabited localities ==
Administrative/municipal composition
Rural okrugs/Rural settlements	Population	Rural localities in jurisdiction*
Atamaysky (Атамайский)	673	**selo of Byas-Kyuyol**
Berdigestyakhsky (Бердигестяхский)	6,472	**selo of Berdigestyakh** (administrative center of the district); selo of May
Kirovsky (Кировский)	633	**selo of Asyma**; selo of Chekya-Byas
Maganinsky (Маганинский)	536	**selo of Orto-Surt**
Maltaninsky (Малтанинский)	671	**selo of Keptin**; selo of Tongulakh; selo of Tysagachchy
Mytakhsky (Мытахский)	620	**selo of Dikimdya**; selo of Ebya
Odununsky (Одунунский)	1,016	**selo of Magaras**; selo of Ulu-Sysy; selo of Kharyyalakh
Oktyabrsky (Октябрьский)	541	**selo of Kyuyorelyakh**
Shologonsky (Шологонский)	544	**selo of Yert**

*Administrative centers are shown in bold

== Economy ==
The economy of the district is mostly based on agriculture.

== Demographics ==
As of the 2021 Census, the ethnic composition was as follows:

- Yakuts: 96.5%
- Evenks: 1.0%
- Russians: 0.6%
- others ethnicities: 1.9%

== See also ==
- Lena Plateau
