= Namsky District =

Namsky District Намский улус (Russian)
- District

Other transcription(s)
  - Yakut: Нам улууhа
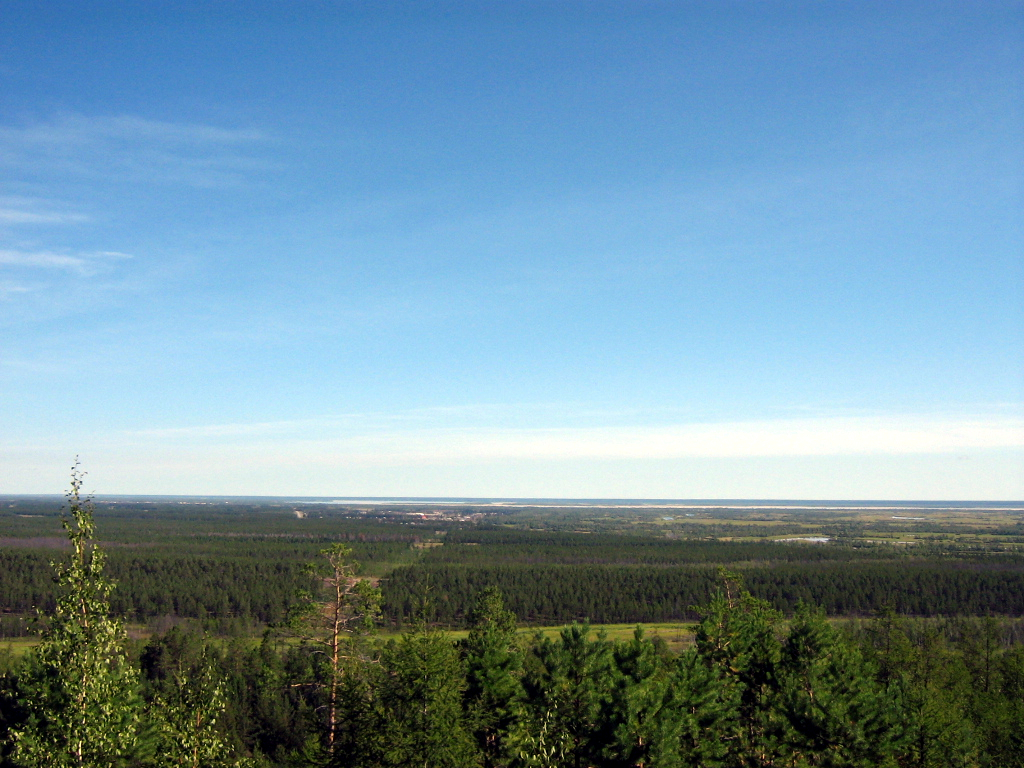
- Ensieli Valley in Namsky District

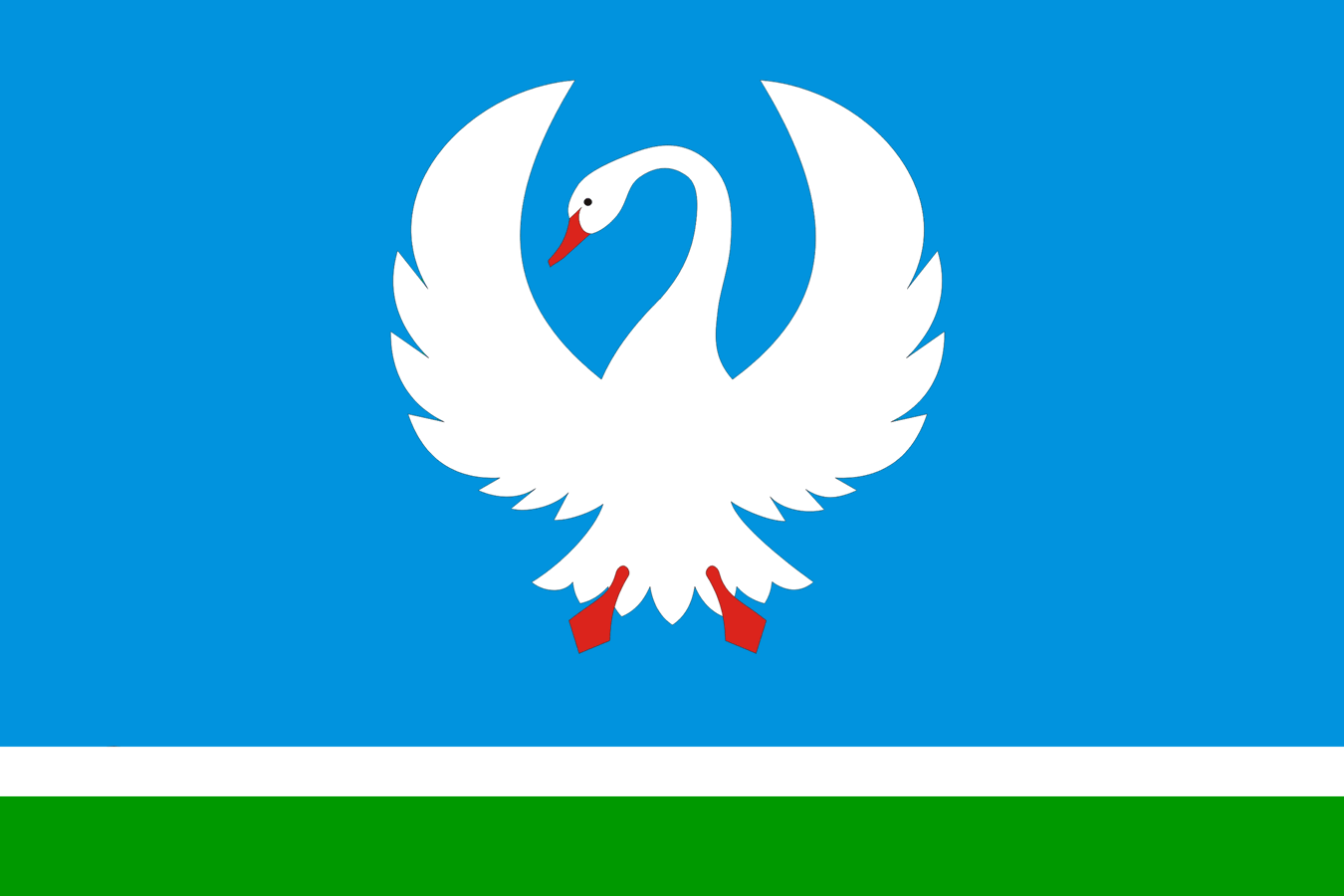
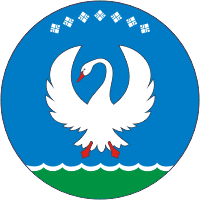
- Flag Coat of arms
- Location of Namsky District in the Sakha Republic
- Coordinates: 58°40′N 125°21′E
- Country: Russia
- Federal subject: Sakha Republic
- Established: February 10, 1930
- Administrative center: Namtsy

Area
  - Total: 11,900 km^{2} (4,600 sq mi)

Population (2010 Census)
  - Total: 23,198
  - Density: 1.95/km^{2} (5.05/sq mi)
  - Urban: 0%
  - Rural: 100%

Administrative structure
  - Administrative divisions: 18 Rural okrugs
  - Inhabited localities: 24 rural localities

Municipal structure
  - Municipally incorporated as: Namsky Municipal District
  - Municipal divisions: 0 urban settlements, 19 rural settlements
- Time zone: UTC+9 (MSK+6)
- OKTMO ID: 98635000
- Website: https://mr-namskij.sakha.gov.ru

Namsky District (Russian: На́мский улу́с; Yakut: Нам улууһа, Nam uluuha) is an administrative and municipal district (raion, or ulus), one of the thirty-four in the Sakha Republic, Russia. The district is located in the center of the republic and borders Ust-Aldansky District in the east, Megino-Kangalassky District in the southeast, the territory of the city of republic significance of Yakutsk in the south, Gorny District in the west, and Kobyaysky District in the north. The area of the district is 11,900 square kilometers (4,600 sq mi). Its administrative center is the rural locality (a selo) of Namtsy. As of the 2010 Census, the total population of the district was 23,198, with the population of Namtsy accounting for 38.3% of that number.

Historical population
| Year | Pop. | ±% |
|---|---|---|
| 1970 | 14,787 | — |
| 1979 | 15,508 | +4.9% |
| 1989 | 18,244 | +17.6% |
| 2002 | 21,454 | +17.6% |
| 2010 | 23,198 | +8.1% |
| 2021 | 25,142 | +8.4% |
Source: Census data

== Geography ==
The landscape of the district is the flat territory of the Central Yakutian Lowland. The main river is the Lena with its tributaries, such as the Kenkeme and Khanchaly.

=== Climate ===
Average January temperature is −42 °C (−44 °F) and average July temperature is +17–+18 °C (63–64 °F). Average annual precipitation is 200–250 millimeters (7.9–9.8 in).

== History ==
The district was established on February 10, 1930.

== Administrative and municipal status ==
Within the framework of administrative divisions, Namsky District is one of the thirty-four in the republic. It is divided into eighteen rural okrugs (naslegs), which comprise twenty-three rural localities; as well as the selo of Grafsky Bereg, which is not a part of any rural okrug. As a municipal division, the district is incorporated as Namsky Municipal District. The eighteen rural okrugs and the selo of Grafsky Bereg are incorporated into nineteen rural settlements within the municipal district. The selo of Namtsy serves as the administrative center of both the administrative and municipal district.

=== Inhabited localities ===
Administrative/municipal composition
| Rural okrugs/Rural settlements | Population | Rural localities in jurisdiction* |
|---|---|---|
| Arbynsky (Арбынский) | 268 | **selo of Sygynnakh** |
| Betyunsky (Бетюнский) | 608 | **selo of Byutyay-Yurdya** |
| Yedeysky (Едейский) | 1,219 | **selo of Ymyyakhtakh** |
| Iskrovsky (Искровский) | 202 | **selo of Kyureng-At** |
| Kebekyonsky (Кебекёнский) | 544 | **selo of Kharyyalakh** |
| Lensky (Ленский) | 8,890 | **selo of Namtsy** (administrative center of the district) |
| Modutsky (Модутский) | 986 | **selo of Tumul** |
| Nikolsky (Никольский) | 427 | **selo of Nikolsky** |
| Partizansky (Партизанский) | 937 | **selo of Partizan** |
| Salbansky (Салбанский) | 345 | **selo of Khongor-Biye** |
| Tastakhsky (Тастахский) | 273 | **selo of Yergyolyokh** |
| Tyubinsky (Тюбинский) | 408 | **selo of Bulus** |
| Frunzensky (Фрунзенский) | 155 | **selo of Frunze** |
| Khamagattinsky (Хамагаттинский) | 1,727 | **selo of Krest-Kytyl** |
| Khatyn-Arinsky/Khatyn-Arynsky (Хатын-Аринский/Хатын-Арынский) | 2,654 | **selo of Appany**; selo of Kysyl-Derevnya |
| Khatyryksky (Хатырыкский) | 1,084 | **selo of Stolby**; **selo of Maymaga** (municipally, a part of Maymaga Rural Settlement) |
| Khomustakhsky 1-y (Хомустахский 1-й) | 1,502 | **selo of Kysyl-Syr** |
| Khomustakhsky 2-y (Хомустахский 2-й) | 812 | **selo of Khatas**; selo of Voin; selo of Taragay-Byas; selo of Yuner-Olokh |
| Rural localities which are not a part of a rural okrug | Population | Rural localities |
| | 904 | selo of Grafsky Bereg (municipally, a part of Khatyn-Arynsky Rural Settlement) |

*Administrative centers are shown in bold

== Demographics ==
As of the 2021 Census, the ethnic composition was as follows:

- Yakuts: 94.9%
- Russians: 2.2%
- Evenks: 1.7%
- others: 1.2%

== Notable people ==
- Aita Shaposhnikova, poet
