= Berdigestyakh =

Berdigestyakh Бердигестях
- Selo

Other transcription(s)
  - Sakha: Бэрдьигэстээх
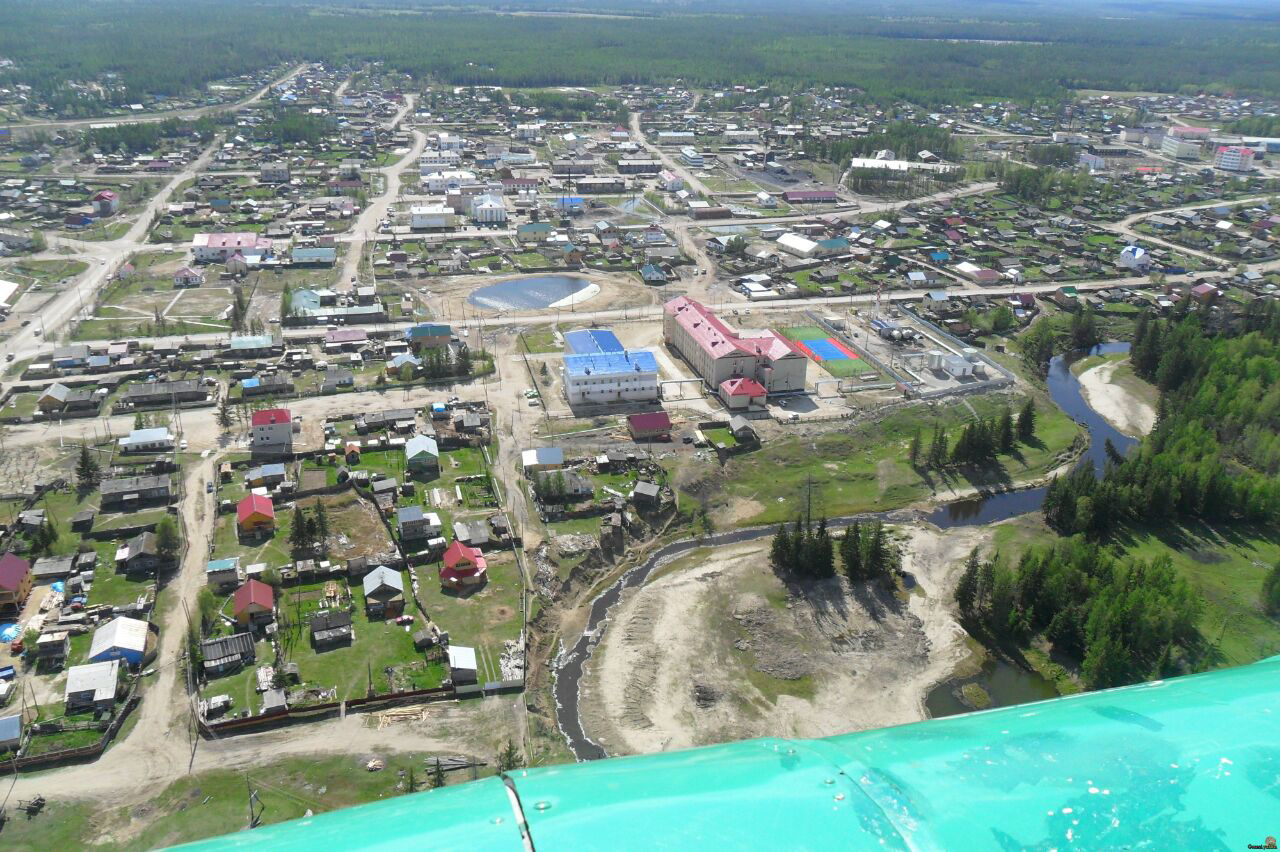
- Aerial view of Berdigestyakh
- Interactive map of Berdigestyakh
- Location of Berdigestyakh Berdigestyakh (Sakha Republic)
- Coordinates: 62°05′57″N 126°42′05″E
- Country: Russia
- Federal subject: Sakha Republic
- Administrative district: Gorny District
- Rural okrugSelsoviet: Berdigestyakhsky Rural Okrug
- Elevation: 212 m (696 ft)

Population (2010 Census)
  - Total: 6,462
  - Estimate (2021): 6,956 (+7.6%)

Administrative status
  - Capital of: Gorny District, Berdigestyakhsky Rural Okrug

Municipal status
  - Municipal district: Gorny Municipal District
  - Rural settlement: Berdigestyakhsky Rural Settlement
  - Capital of: Gorny Municipal District, Berdigestyakhsky Rural Settlement
- Time zone: UTC+
- Postal code: 678030
- OKTMO ID: 98620410101

Berdigestyakh (Russian: Бердигестях; Yakut: Бэрдьигэстээх, Bercigesteex) is a rural locality (a selo) and the administrative center of Gorny District in the Sakha Republic, Russia. Its population as of the 2010 Census was 6,462, up from 6,149 recorded during the 2002 Census. Berdigestyakh is located by the Matta River.
