= Namtsy =

Namtsy Намцы
- Selo

Other transcription(s)
  - Sakha: Нам
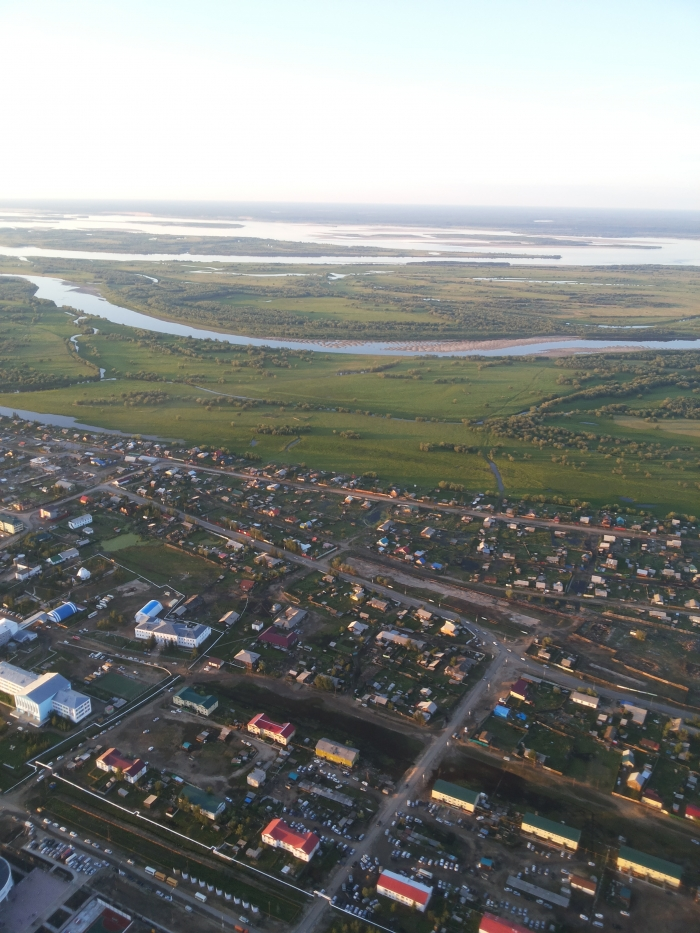
- Aerial view of Namtsy

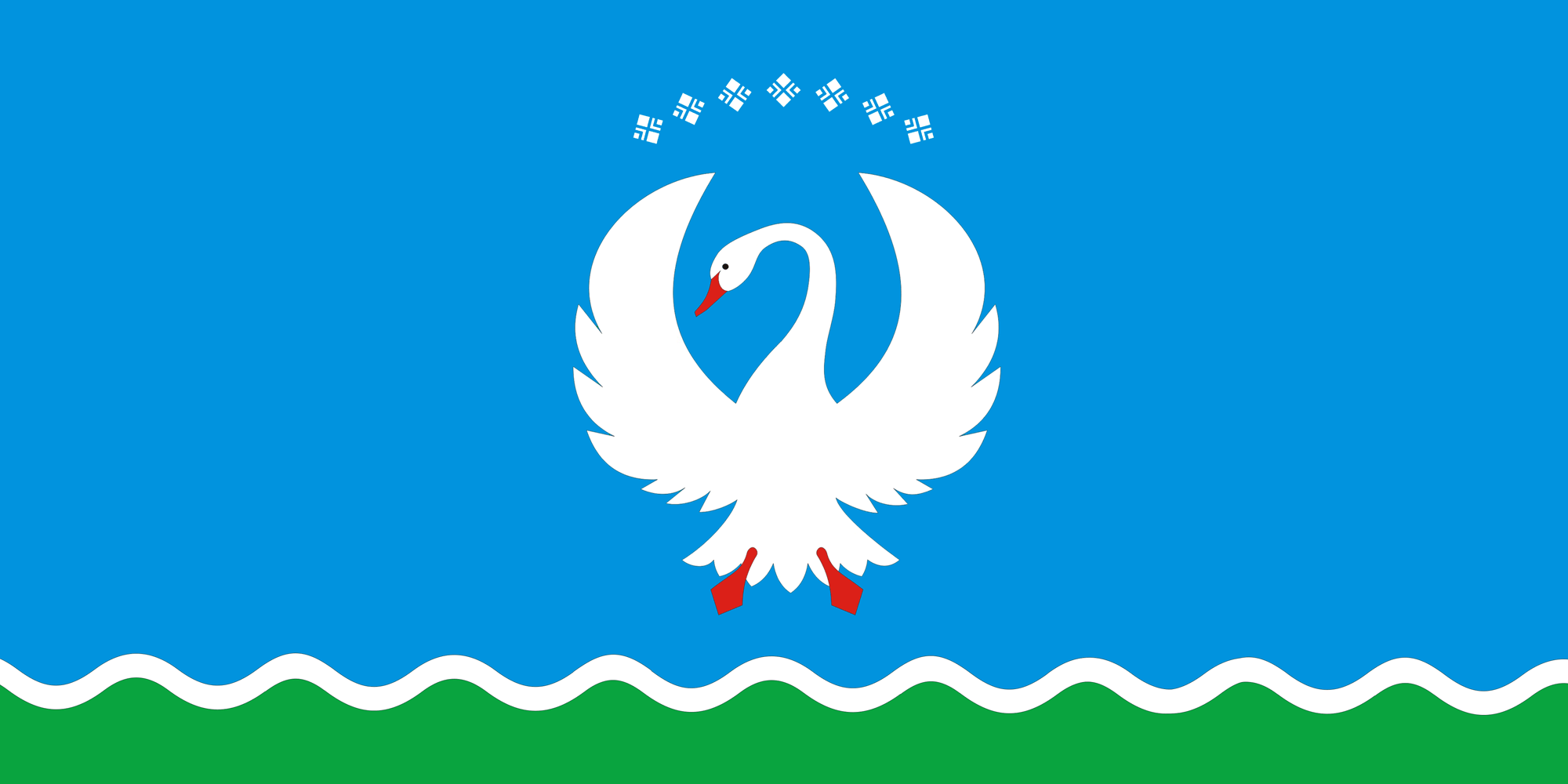
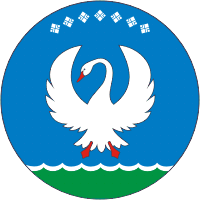
- Flag Coat of arms
- Interactive map of Namtsy
- Location of Namtsy Namtsy (Sakha Republic)
- Coordinates: 62°44′N 129°40′E
- Country: Russia
- Federal subject: Sakha Republic
- Administrative district: Namsky District
- Rural okrugSelsoviet: Lensky Rural Okrug

Population (2010 Census)
  - Total: 8,890
  - Estimate (2021): 10,364 (+16.6%)

Administrative status
  - Capital of: Namsky District, Lensky Rural Okrug

Municipal status
  - Municipal district: Namsky Municipal District
  - Rural settlement: Lensky Rural Settlement
  - Capital of: Namsky Municipal District, Lensky Rural Settlement
- Time zone: UTC+9 (MSK+6)
- Postal code: 678380
- OKTMO ID: 98635425101

Namtsy (Russian: На́мцы; Yakut: Нам, Nam) is a rural locality (a selo), the administrative center of Namsky District and the only inhabited locality, as well as the administrative center, of Lensky Rural Okrug of Namsky District in the Sakha Republic, Russia. Its population as of the 2010 Census was 8,890, up from 8,249 recorded during the 2002 Census.
