= Tuora-Kyuyol =

Rural locality name

Tuora-Kyuyol (Russian: Туора-Кюёль) is the name of several rural localities in the Sakha Republic, Russia:

- Tuora-Kyuyol, Churapchinsky District, Sakha Republic, a selo in Khayakhsytsky Rural Okrug of Churapchinsky District
- Tuora-Kyuyol, Tattinsky District, Sakha Republic, a selo in Zhuleysky Rural Okrug of Tattinsky District
