= Diring =

Diring may refer to:

- Diring, Khoptoginsky Rural Okrug, Churapchinsky District, Sakha Republic, a village (selo) in Khoptoginsky Rural Okrug of Churapchinsky District of the Sakha Republic, Russia
- Diring, Tyolyoysky Rural Okrug, Churapchinsky District, Sakha Republic, a village (selo) in Tyolyoysky Rural Okrug of Churapchinsky District of the Sakha Republic, Russia
