= Vasily-Alasa =

Vasily-Alasa Василий Аласа
- Selo
- Interactive map of Vasily-Alasa
- Location of Vasily-Alasa Vasily-Alasa (Sakha Republic)
- Coordinates: 61°07′54″N 132°34′20″E
- Country: Russia
- Federal subject: Sakha Republic
- Administrative district: Churapchinsky District
- Rural okrugSelsoviet: Ozhulunsky Rural Okrug

Population (2010 Census)
  - Total: 0
  - Estimate (2021): 1 )

Municipal status
  - Municipal district: Churapchinsky Municipal District
  - Rural settlement: Ozhulunsky Rural Settlement
- Time zone: UTC+
- Postal code: 678678
- OKTMO ID: 98658430111

Vasily-Alasa (Russian: Василий-Аласа; Yakut: Баһылай Алааһа, romanized: Bahılay Alaaha) is a rural locality (a selo), and one of three settlements in Ozhulunsky Rural Okrug of Churapchinsky District in the Sakha Republic, Russia, in addition to Dyabyla, the administrative center of the Rural Okrug, and Yuryakh-Kyuyore. It is located 36 kilometers (22 mi) from Churapcha, the administrative center of the district and 21 kilometers (13 mi) from Dyabyla. Its population as of the 2010 Census was 0; the same as recorded in the 2002 Census.
