= Ulakhan-Ebya =

Ulakhan-Ebya Улахан-Эбя Улахан Эбэ (Yakut)
- Selo
- Interactive map of Ulakhan-Ebya
- Location of Ulakhan-Ebya Ulakhan-Ebya (Sakha Republic)
- Coordinates: 61°44′57″N 132°17′41″E
- Country: Russia
- Federal subject: Sakha Republic
- Administrative district: Churapchinsky District
- Rural okrugSelsoviet: Khoptoginsky Rural Okrug

Population (2010 Census)
  - Total: 53
  - Estimate (2021): 23 (−56.6%)

Municipal status
  - Municipal district: Churapchinsky Municipal District
  - Rural settlement: Khoptoginsky Rural Settlement
- Time zone: UTC+
- Postal code: 678660
- OKTMO ID: 98658460106

Ulakhan-Ebya (Russian: Улахан-Эбя, Yakut: Улахан Эбэ, Ulaxan Ebe) is a rural locality (a selo), and one of two settlements in Khoptoginsky Rural Okrug of Churapchinsky District in the Sakha Republic, Russia, in addition to Diring, the administrative center of the Rural Okrug. It is located 39 kilometers (24 mi) from Churapcha, the administrative center of the district and 15 kilometers (9.3 mi) from Yuryung-Kyuyol. Its population as of the 2010 Census was 53; down from 73 recorded in the 2002 Census.
