= Myandiye =

Myandiye Мяндийе Мээндийэ (Yakut)
- Selo
- Interactive map of Myandiye
- Location of Myandiye Myandiye (Sakha Republic)
- Coordinates: 61°56′09″N 132°07′10″E
- Country: Russia
- Federal subject: Sakha Republic
- Administrative district: Churapchinsky District
- Rural okrugSelsoviet: Tyolyoysky Rural Okrug

Population (2010 Census)
  - Total: 0
  - Estimate (2021): 0 )

Municipal status
  - Municipal district: Churapchinsky Municipal District
  - Rural settlement: Tyolyoysky Rural Settlement
- Time zone: UTC+
- Postal code: 678682
- OKTMO ID: 98658442106

Myandiye (Russian: Мяндийе, Yakut: Мээндийэ, Meendiye) is a rural locality (a selo), and one of two settlements in Tyolyoysky Rural Okrug of Churapchinsky District in the Sakha Republic, Russia, in addition to Diring, the administrative center of the Rural Okrug. It is located 23 kilometers (14 mi) from Churapcha, the administrative center of the district and 6 kilometers (3.7 mi) from Diring. Its population as of the 2010 Census was 0; the same as recorded in the 2002 Census.
