= Tolon, Russia =

Tolon (Russian: Толон) is the name of several rural localities in Russia.

== Modern localities ==
- Tolon, Bakhsytsky Rural Okrug, Churapchinsky District, Sakha Republic, a selo in Bakhsytsky Rural Okrug of Churapchinsky District in the Sakha Republic
- Tolon, Chakyrsky Rural Okrug, Churapchinsky District, Sakha Republic, a selo in Chakyrsky Rural Okrug of Churapchinsky District in the Sakha Republic
- Tolon, Lensky District, Sakha Republic, a selo in Tolonsky Rural Okrug of Lensky District in the Sakha Republic
- Tolon, Khadansky Rural Okrug, Suntarsky District, Sakha Republic, a selo in Khadansky Rural Okrug of Suntarsky District in the Sakha Republic
- Tolon, Tolonsky Rural Okrug, Suntarsky District, Sakha Republic, a selo in Tolonsky Rural Okrug of Suntarsky District in the Sakha Republic

== Alternative names ==
- Tolon, alternative name of Talon, a selo in Olsky District of Magadan Oblast; 59°46′N 148°39′E
