= Ulakhan-Kyuyol, Churapchinsky District, Sakha Republic =

Ulakhan-Kyuyol Улахан-Кюёль Улахан Күөл (Yakut)
- Selo
- Interactive map of Ulakhan-Kyuyol
- Location of Ulakhan-Kyuyol Ulakhan-Kyuyol (Sakha Republic)
- Coordinates: 62°15′42″N 132°08′31″E
- Country: Russia
- Federal subject: Sakha Republic
- Administrative district: Churapchinsky District
- Rural okrugSelsoviet: Sylansky Rural Okrug

Population (2010 Census)
  - Total: 135
  - Estimate (2021): 142 (+5.2%)

Municipal status
  - Municipal district: Churapchinsky Municipal District
  - Rural settlement: Sylansky Rural Settlement
- Time zone: UTC+
- Postal code: 678674
- OKTMO ID: 98658440111

Ulakhan-Kyuyol (Russian: Улахан-Кюёль, Yakut: Улахан Күөл, Ulaxan Küöl) is a rural locality (a selo), and one of five settlements in Sylansky Rural Okrug of Churapchinsky District in the Sakha Republic, Russia, in addition to Usun-Kyuyol, the administrative center of the Rural Okrug, Berya, Dyarla and Ogusur. It is located 58 kilometers (36 mi) from Churapcha, the administrative center of the district and 12 kilometers (7.5 mi) from Usun-Kyuyol. Its population as of the 2010 Census was 135; down from 136 recorded in the 2002 Census.
