= Kystyk-Kugda =

Kystyk-Kugda Кыстык-Кугда
- Selo
- Interactive map of Kystyk-Kugda
- Location of Kystyk-Kugda Kystyk-Kugda (Sakha Republic)
- Coordinates: 61°36′38″N 133°10′51″E
- Country: Russia
- Federal subject: Sakha Republic
- Administrative district: Churapchinsky District
- Rural okrugSelsoviet: Bolugursky Rural Okrug

Population (2010 Census)
  - Total: 1
  - Estimate (2021): 12 (+1,100%)

Municipal status
  - Municipal district: Churapchinsky Municipal District
  - Rural settlement: Bolugursky Rural Settlement
- Time zone: UTC+
- Postal code: 678677
- OKTMO ID: 98658415106

Kystyk-Kugda (Russian: Кыстык-Кугда; Yakut: Кыстык-Кугда, Kıstık-Kugda) is a rural locality (a selo), and one of two settlements in Bolugursky Rural Okrug of Churapchinsky District in the Sakha Republic, Russia, in addition to Myndagai, the administrative center of the Rural Okrug. It is located 72 kilometers (45 mi) from Churapcha, the administrative center of the district and 2 kilometers (1.2 mi) from Myndagai. Its population as of the 2010 Census was 1; down from 17 recorded in the 2002 Census.
