= Ogusur =

Ogusur Огусур Оҕуһур (Yakut)
- Selo
- Interactive map of Ogusur
- Location of Ogusur Ogusur (Sakha Republic)
- Coordinates: 62°08′20″N 132°26′03″E
- Country: Russia
- Federal subject: Sakha Republic
- Administrative district: Churapchinsky District
- Rural okrugSelsoviet: Sylansky Rural Okrug

Population (2010 Census)
  - Total: 107
  - Estimate (2021): 107 (0%)

Municipal status
  - Municipal district: Churapchinsky Municipal District
  - Rural settlement: Sylansky Rural Settlement
- Time zone: UTC+
- Postal code: 678674
- OKTMO ID: 98658440116

Ogusur (Russian: Огусур, Yakut: Оҕуһур, Oğuhur) is a rural locality (a selo), and one of five settlements in Sylansky Rural Okrug of Churapchinsky District in the Sakha Republic, Russia, in addition to Usun-Kyuyol, the administrative center of the Rural Okrug, Berya, Dyarla and Ulakhan-Kyuyol. It is located 37 kilometers (23 mi) from Churapcha, the administrative center of the district and 12 kilometers (7.5 mi) from Usun-Kyuyol. Its population as of the 2010 Census was 107; down from 134 recorded in the 2002 Census.
