= Uorga =

Uorga Уорга Уорҕа (Yakut)
- Selo
- Interactive map of Uorga
- Location of Uorga Uorga (Sakha Republic)
- Coordinates: 61°44′57″N 132°17′41″E
- Country: Russia
- Federal subject: Sakha Republic
- Administrative district: Churapchinsky District
- Rural okrugSelsoviet: Khadarsky Rural Okrug

Population (2010 Census)
  - Total: 50
  - Estimate (2021): 62 (+24%)

Municipal status
  - Municipal district: Churapchinsky Municipal District
  - Rural settlement: Khadarsky Rural Settlement
- Time zone: UTC+
- Postal code: 678692
- OKTMO ID: 98658445106

Uorga (Russian: Уорга, Yakut: Уорҕа, Uorğa) is a rural locality (a selo), and one of two settlements in Khadarsky Rural Okrug of Churapchinsky District in the Sakha Republic, Russia, in addition to Yuryung-Kyuyol, the administrative center of the Rural Okrug. It is located 39 kilometers (24 mi) from Churapcha, the administrative center of the district and 15 kilometers (9.3 mi) from Yuryung-Kyuyol. Its population as of the 2010 Census was 50; down from 83 recorded in the 2002 Census.
