= Dyarla =

Dyarla Дярла Дьаарыла (Yakut)
- Selo
- Interactive map of Dyarla
- Location of Dyarla Dyarla (Sakha Republic)
- Coordinates: 62°03′10″N 132°25′59″E
- Country: Russia
- Federal subject: Sakha Republic
- Administrative district: Churapchinsky District
- Rural okrugSelsoviet: Sylansky Rural Okrug

Population (2010 Census)
  - Total: 8
  - Estimate (2021): 2 (−75%)

Municipal status
  - Municipal district: Churapchinsky Municipal District
  - Rural settlement: Sylansky Rural Settlement
- Time zone: UTC+
- Postal code: 678674
- OKTMO ID: 98658440121

Dyarla (Russian: Дярла, Yakut: Дьаарыла, Caarıla) is a rural locality (a selo), and one of five settlements in Sylansky Rural Okrug of Churapchinsky District in the Sakha Republic, Russia, in addition to Usun-Kyuyol, the administrative center of the Rural Okrug, Berya, Ogusur and Ulakhan-Kyuyol. It is located 19 kilometers (12 mi) from Churapcha, the administrative center of the district and 7 kilometers (4.3 mi) from Usun-Kyuyol. Its population as of the 2010 Census was 8; down from 9 recorded in the 2002 Census. There is a post office in Dyarla, its postal code is 678674.
