= Berya, Russia =

Berya Беря Бэрэ (Yakut)
- Selo
- Interactive map of Berya
- Location of Berya Berya (Sakha Republic)
- Coordinates: 62°10′39″N 132°01′36″E
- Country: Russia
- Federal subject: Sakha Republic
- Administrative district: Churapchinsky District
- Rural okrugSelsoviet: Sylansky Rural Okrug

Population (2010 Census)
  - Total: 60
  - Estimate (2021): 34 (−43.3%)

Municipal status
  - Municipal district: Churapchinsky Municipal District
  - Rural settlement: Sylansky Rural Settlement
- Time zone: UTC+
- Postal code: 678674
- OKTMO ID: 98658440106

Berya (Russian: Беря, Yakut: Бэрэ, Bere) is a rural locality (a selo), and one of five settlements in Sylansky Rural Okrug of Churapchinsky District in the Sakha Republic, Russia, in addition to Usun-Kyuyol, the administrative center of the Rural Okrug, Dyarla, Ogusur and Ulakhan-Kyuyol. It is located 31 kilometers (19 mi) from Churapcha, the administrative center of the district and 7 kilometers (4.3 mi) from Usun-Kyuyol. Its population as of the 2010 Census was 60; down from 66 recorded in the 2002 Census.
