= Lebiya =

Lebiya Лебия
- Selo
- Interactive map of Lebiya
- Location of Lebiya Lebiya (Sakha Republic)
- Coordinates: 62°19′N 131°26′E
- Country: Russia
- Federal subject: Sakha Republic
- Administrative district: Churapchinsky District
- Rural okrugSelsoviet: Bakhsytsky Rural Okrug
- Founded: 1939

Population (2010 Census)
  - Total: 0
  - Estimate (2021): 0 )

Municipal status
  - Municipal district: Churapchinsky Municipal District
  - Rural settlement: Bakhsytsky Rural Settlement
- Time zone: UTC+
- Postal codes: 678683, 678726
- OKTMO ID: 98658407106

Lebiya (Russian: Лебия; Yakut: Лэбийэ, Lebiye) is a rural locality (a selo) in Bakhsytsky Rural Okrug of Churapchinsky District in the Sakha Republic, Russia, located 103 kilometers (64 mi) from Churapcha, the administrative center of the district, and 7 kilometers (4.3 mi) from Tolon, the administrative center of the rural okrug. It had no population as of the 2010 Census; in the 2002 Census, the recorded population was 3.
