= Myryla =

Myryla Мырыла
- Selo
- Interactive map of Myryla
- Location of Myryla Myryla (Sakha Republic)
- Coordinates: 61°51′N 133°39′E
- Country: Russia
- Federal subject: Sakha Republic
- Administrative district: Churapchinsky District
- Rural okrugSelsoviet: Solovyevsky Rural Okrug

Population (2010 Census)
  - Total: 507
  - Estimate (2021): 492 (−3%)

Administrative status
  - Capital of: Solovyevsky Rural Okrug

Municipal status
  - Municipal district: Churapchinsky Municipal District
  - Rural settlement: Solovyevsky Rural Settlement
  - Capital of: Solovyevsky Rural Settlement
- Time zone: UTC+
- Postal code: 678679
- OKTMO ID: 98658435101

Myryla (Russian: Мырыла; Yakut: Мырыла, Mırıla) is a rural locality (a selo) the administrative center, and one of two inhabited localities including Khakhyyakh of Solovyevsky Rural Okrug in Churapchinsky District of the Sakha Republic, Russia, located 76 kilometers (47 mi) from Churapcha, the administrative center of the district. Its population as of the 2010 Census was 507; down from 570 recorded in the 2002 Census.

== Geography ==
The village is located south-east of the center of the Churapchinsky ulus, which is 85 kilometers from Churapchi.

== Population ==
Population size
2002	2010
570	↘ 507

Gender composition

According to the 2010 All-Russian Population Census, out of the population of 507 people there are 260 men and 247 women (51.3% and 48.7%, respectively).

National composition

According to the 2002 census, in the national structure of the population, the Yakuts accounted for 100% of the total population of 570 people.
