= Tolon =

Tolon may refer to:

== Places ==
- Tolon, the Occitan name of Toulon, a city in southern France
- Tolon, Ghana, a town in the Northern Region, Ghana
- Tolon District, Ghana
- Tolon-Kumbungu District, Ghana
- Tolon, Katharevousa name of Tolo, a village in the Peloponnese, Greece
- Tolon, Russia, several rural localities in Russia

== People ==
- Canan Tolon (born 1955), Turkish-born artist
- Hurşit Tolon (born 1942), Turkish general
- Kamil Tolon (born 1912), Turkish businessperson, industrialist, and inventor
- Kenneth Tolon II (born 1981), American college football player
- Miguel Teurbe Tolón (1820–1857), Cuban playwright, poet, and the creator of Cuba's flag and coat of arms
- Tolon Brown, writer/producer of the children's TV series Arthur

== Other uses ==
- Tolon (crater), a crater on Mars
- Tolon (Ghana parliament constituency), a constituency represented in the Parliament of Ghana

== See also ==
- Tolono, Illinois
- Tulun, Iran
