= Uolba =

Uolba Уолба
- Selo
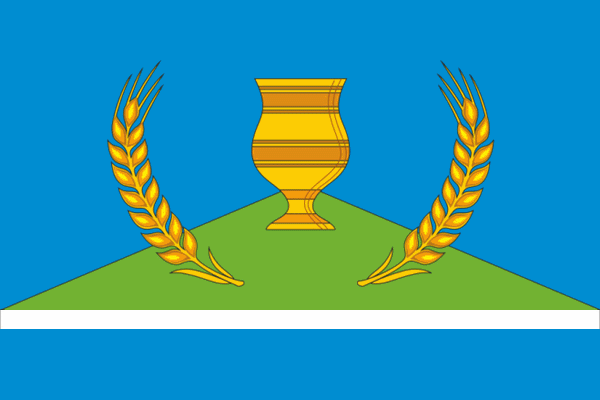
- Flag
- Interactive map of Uolba
- Location of Uolba Uolba (Sakha Republic)
- Coordinates: 62°37′N 133°37′E
- Country: Russia
- Federal subject: Sakha Republic
- Administrative district: Tattinsky District
- Rural okrugSelsoviet: Uolbinsky Rural Okrug

Population (2010 Census)
  - Total: 536
  - Estimate (2021): 534 (−0.4%)

Administrative status
  - Capital of: Uolbinsky Rural Okrug

Municipal status
  - Municipal district: Tattinsky Municipal District
  - Rural settlement: Uolbinsky Rural Settlement
  - Capital of: Uolbinsky Rural Settlement
- Time zone: UTC+
- Postal code: 678655
- OKTMO ID: 98604455101

Uolba (Russian: Уолба; Yakut: Уолба) is a rural locality (a selo), the only inhabited locality, and the administrative center of Uolbinsky Rural Okrug of Tattinsky District in the Sakha Republic, Russia, located 33 kilometers (21 mi) from Ytyk-Kyuyol, the administrative center of the district. Its population as of the 2010 Census was 536, of whom 270 were male and 266 female, up from 532 as recorded during the 2002 Census.

== Geography ==
Uolba is located in a flat area by the river Tatta.
