= Chymnayi =

Chymnayi Чымнайи
- Selo
- Interactive map of Chymnayi
- Location of Chymnayi Chymnayi (Sakha Republic)
- Coordinates: 62°15′N 134°32′E
- Country: Russia
- Federal subject: Sakha Republic
- Administrative district: Tattinsky District
- Rural okrugSelsoviet: Ust-Amginsky Rural Okrug

Population (2010 Census)
  - Total: 573
  - Estimate (2021): 477 (−16.8%)

Administrative status
  - Capital of: Ust-Amginsky Rural Okrug

Municipal status
  - Municipal district: Tattinsky Municipal District
  - Rural settlement: Ust-Amginsky Rural Settlement
  - Capital of: Ust-Amginsky Rural Settlement
- Time zone: UTC+
- Postal code: 678657
- OKTMO ID: 98604460101

Chymnayi (Russian: Чымнайи; Yakut: Чымнаайы, Çımnaayı) is a rural locality (a selo), the only inhabited locality, and the administrative center of Ust-Amginsky Rural Okrug of Tattinsky District in the Sakha Republic, Russia, located 60 kilometers (37 mi) from Ytyk-Kyuyol, the administrative center of the district. Its population as of the 2010 Census was 573, down from 594 recorded during the 2002 Census.
