= Borobul =

Borobul Боробул
- Selo
- Interactive map of Borobul
- Location of Borobul Borobul (Sakha Republic)
- Coordinates: 62°16′N 133°28′E
- Country: Russia
- Federal subject: Sakha Republic
- Administrative district: Tattinsky District
- Rural okrugSelsoviet: Zhokhsogonsky Rural Okrug

Population
  - Estimate (2002): 949 )

Administrative status
  - Capital of: Zhokhsogonsky Rural Okrug

Municipal status
  - Municipal district: Tattinsky Municipal District
  - Rural settlement: Zhokhsogonsky Rural Settlement
  - Capital of: Zhokhsogonsky Rural Settlement
- Time zone: UTC+
- Postal code: 678660
- OKTMO ID: 98604420101

Borobul (Russian: Боробул; Yakut: Боробул) is a rural locality (a selo) and the administrative center, and one of two inhabited localities including Dakky of Zhokhsogonsky Rural Okrug in Tattinsky District of the Sakha Republic, Russia, located 10 kilometers (6.2 mi) from Ytyk-Kyuyol, the administrative center of the district. Its population as of the 2002 Census was 949.

== Geography ==
The village is located in a flat area by river Tatta.
