= Kilyanki =

Kilyanki Килянки
- Selo
- Interactive map of Kilyanki
- Location of Kilyanki Kilyanki (Sakha Republic)
- Coordinates: 62°15′N 132°15′E
- Country: Russia
- Federal subject: Sakha Republic
- Administrative district: Churapchinsky District
- Rural okrugSelsoviet: Kytanakhsky Rural Okrug

Population (2010 Census)
  - Total: 518
  - Estimate (2021): 452 (−12.7%)

Administrative status
  - Capital of: Kytanakhsky Rural Okrug

Municipal status
  - Municipal district: Churapchinsky Municipal District
  - Rural settlement: Kytanakhsky Rural Settlement
  - Capital of: Kytanakhsky Rural Settlement
- Time zone: UTC+
- Postal code: 678675
- OKTMO ID: 98658420101

Kilyanki (Russian: Килянки; Yakut: Килэҥки, romanized: Kileñki) is a rural locality (a selo), the only inhabited locality, and the administrative center of Kytanakhsky Rural Okrug of Churapchinsky District in the Sakha Republic, Russia, located 45 kilometers (28 mi) from Churapcha, the administrative center of the district. Its population as of the 2010 Census was 518, down from 538 as recorded during the 2002 Census.
