= Chyappara =

Chyappara Чыаппара
- Selo
- Interactive map of Chyappara
- Location of Chyappara Chyappara (Sakha Republic)
- Coordinates: 62°10′N 131°26′E
- Country: Russia
- Federal subject: Sakha Republic
- Administrative district: Churapchinsky District
- Rural okrugSelsoviet: Alagarsky Rural Okrug
- Founded: 1762

Population (2010 Census)
  - Total: 728
  - Estimate (2021): 622 (−14.6%)

Administrative status
  - Capital of: Alagarsky Rural Okrug

Municipal status
  - Municipal district: Churapchinsky Municipal District
  - Rural settlement: Alagarsky Rural Settlement
  - Capital of: Alagarsky Rural Settlement
- Time zone: UTC+
- Postal code: 678670
- OKTMO ID: 98658402101

Chyappara (Russian: Чыаппара) is a rural locality (a selo), the only inhabited locality, and the administrative center of Alagarsky Rural Okrug of Churapchinsky District in the Sakha Republic, Russia, located 89 kilometers (55 mi) from Churapcha, the administrative center of the district. Its population as of the 2010 Census was 728, down from 770 as recorded during the 2002 Census.
