= Kyndal =

Kyndal Кындал
- Selo
- Interactive map of Kyndal
- Location of Kyndal Kyndal (Sakha Republic)
- Coordinates: 62°07′54″N 132°44′35″E
- Country: Russia
- Federal subject: Sakha Republic
- Administrative district: Churapchinsky District
- Rural okrugSelsoviet: Boltoginsky Rural Okrug

Population (2010 Census)
  - Total: 50
  - Estimate (2021): 39 (−22%)

Municipal status
  - Municipal district: Churapchinsky Municipal District
  - Rural settlement: Boltoginsky Rural Settlement
- Time zone: UTC+
- Postal code: 678676
- OKTMO ID: 98658410106

Kyndal (Russian: Кындал; Yakut: Кындал, Kındal) is a rural locality (a selo), and one of two settlements in Boltoginsky Rural Okrug of Churapchinsky District in the Sakha Republic, Russia, in addition to Kharbala 2-ya, the administrative center of the Rural Okrug. It is located 34 kilometers (21 mi) from Churapcha, the administrative center of the district and 17 kilometers (11 mi) from Kharbala 2-ya. Its population as of the 2010 Census was 50; up from 39 recorded in the 2002 Census.
