= Khara-Aldan =

Khara-Aldan Хара-Алдан
- Selo
- Interactive map of Khara-Aldan
- Location of Khara-Aldan Khara-Aldan (Sakha Republic)
- Coordinates: 63°16′N 133°12′E
- Country: Russia
- Federal subject: Sakha Republic
- Administrative district: Tattinsky District
- Rural okrugSelsoviet: Khara-Aldansky Rural Okrug

Population (2010 Census)
  - Total: 322
  - Estimate (2021): 277 (−14%)

Administrative status
  - Capital of: Khara-Aldansky Rural Okrug

Municipal status
  - Municipal district: Tattinsky Municipal District
  - Rural settlement: Khara-Aldansky Rural Settlement
  - Capital of: Khara-Aldansky Rural Settlement
- Time zone: UTC+
- Postal code: 678654
- OKTMO ID: 98604465101

Khara-Aldan (Russian: Хара-Алдан; Yakut: Хара-Алдан, Xara-Aldan) is a rural locality (a selo), the only inhabited locality, and the administrative center of Khara-Aldansky Rural Okrug of Tattinsky District in the Sakha Republic, Russia, located 150 kilometers (93 mi) from Ytyk-Kyuyol, the administrative center of the district. Its population as of the 2010 Census was 322, down from 337 recorded during the 2002 Census.
