= Bulun, Tattinsky District, Sakha Republic =

Bulun Булун
- Selo
- Interactive map of Bulun
- Location of Bulun Bulun (Sakha Republic)
- Coordinates: 63°01′N 133°28′E
- Country: Russia
- Federal subject: Sakha Republic
- Administrative district: Tattinsky District
- Rural okrugSelsoviet: Aldansky Rural Okrug
- Elevation: 119 m (390 ft)

Population (2010 Census)
  - Total: 1,293
  - Estimate (2021): 1,153 (−10.8%)

Administrative status
  - Capital of: Aldansky Rural Okrug

Municipal status
  - Municipal district: Tattinsky Municipal District
  - Rural settlement: Aldansky Rural Settlement
  - Capital of: Aldansky Rural Settlement
- Time zone: UTC+
- Postal code: 678665
- OKTMO ID: 98604405101

Bulun (Russian: Булун) is a rural locality (a selo), the only inhabited locality, and the administrative center of Aldansky Rural Okrug of Tattinsky District in the Sakha Republic, Russia, located 90 kilometers (56 mi) from Ytyk-Kyuyol, the administrative center of the district. Its population as of the 2010 Census was 1,293, of whom 640 were male and 653 female, up from 1,271 as recorded during the 2002 Census.

== Geography ==
The village is located in a flat area by river Tatta.
