= Kharbala 2-ya =

Kharbala 2-ya Харбала 2-я
- Selo
- Interactive map of Kharbala 2-ya
- Location of Kharbala 2-ya Kharbala 2-ya (Sakha Republic)
- Coordinates: 62°03′N 132°44′E
- Country: Russia
- Federal subject: Sakha Republic
- Administrative district: Churapchinsky District
- Rural okrugSelsoviet: Boltoginsky Rural Okrug
- Founded: 1890

Population
  - Estimate (2002): 410 )

Administrative status
  - Capital of: Boltoginsky Rural Okrug

Municipal status
  - Municipal district: Churapchinsky Municipal District
  - Rural settlement: Boltoginsky Rural Settlement
  - Capital of: Boltoginsky Rural Settlement
- Time zone: UTC+
- Postal code: 678686
- OKTMO ID: 98658410101

Kharbala 2-ya (Russian: Харбала 2-я; Yakut: Иккис Харбала, İkkis Xarbala) is a rural locality (a selo) and the administrative center, and one of two inhabited localities including Kyndal of Boltoginsky Rural Okrug in Churapchinsky District of the Sakha Republic, Russia, located 17 kilometers (11 mi) from Churapcha, the administrative center of the district. Its population as of the 2002 Census was 637.

== Geography ==
The village is located in a flat area by river Tatta.
