= Kyyy =

Kyyy Кыйы
- Selo
- Interactive map of Kyyy
- Location of Kyyy Kyyy (Sakha Republic)
- Coordinates: 62°07′N 133°02′E
- Country: Russia
- Federal subject: Sakha Republic
- Administrative district: Tattinsky District
- Rural okrugSelsoviet: Tyarasinsky Rural Okrug
- Founded: 1930

Population (2010 Census)
  - Total: 818
  - Estimate (2021): 719 (−12.1%)

Administrative status
  - Capital of: Tyarasinsky Rural Okrug

Municipal status
  - Municipal district: Tattinsky Municipal District
  - Rural settlement: Tyarasinsky Rural Settlement
  - Capital of: Tyarasinsky Rural Settlement
- Time zone: UTC+
- Postal code: 678659
- OKTMO ID: 98604450101

Kyyy (Russian: Кыйы; Yakut: Кыйы, Kıyı) is a rural locality (a selo), the only inhabited locality, and the administrative center of Tyarasinsky Rural Okrug of Tattinsky District in the Sakha Republic, Russia, located 45 kilometers (28 mi) from Ytyk-Kyuyol, the administrative center of the district. Its population as of the 2010 Census was 818, of whom 399 were male and 419 female, up from 795 as recorded during the 2002 Census.
