= Yuryakh-Kyuyore =

Yuryakh-Kyuyore Юрях-Кюёре Үрэх Күөрэ (Yakut)
- Selo
- Interactive map of Yuryakh-Kyuyore
- Location of Yuryakh-Kyuyore Yuryakh-Kyuyore (Sakha Republic)
- Coordinates: 62°49′N 132°25′E
- Country: Russia
- Federal subject: Sakha Republic
- Administrative district: Churapchinsky District
- Rural okrugSelsoviet: Ozhulunsky Rural Okrug
- Founded: 1960

Population (2010 Census)
  - Total: 75
  - Estimate (2021): 68 (−9.3%)

Municipal status
  - Municipal district: Churapchinsky Municipal District
  - Rural settlement: Ozhulunsky Rural Settlement
- Time zone: UTC+
- Postal code: 678678
- OKTMO ID: 98658430106

Yuryakh-Kyuyore (Russian: Юрях-Кюёре; Yakut: Үрэх Күөрэ, Ürex Küöre) is a rural locality (a selo) in Ozhulunsky Rural Okrug of Churapchinsky District in the Sakha Republic, Russia. It is located 27 kilometers (17 mi) from Churapcha, the administrative center of the district, and 12 kilometers (7.5 mi) from Dyabyla, the administrative center of the rural okrug. Its population as of the 2010 Census was 75; down from 112 recorded in the 2002 Census.
