= Kharbalakh =

Kharbalakh Харбалах
- Selo
- Interactive map of Kharbalakh
- Location of Kharbalakh Kharbalakh (Sakha Republic)
- Coordinates: 62°11′N 134°15′E
- Country: Russia
- Federal subject: Sakha Republic
- Administrative district: Tattinsky District
- Rural okrugSelsoviet: Sredne-Amginsky Rural Okrug

Population (2010 Census)
  - Total: 1,081
  - Estimate (2021): 958 (−11.4%)

Administrative status
  - Capital of: Sredne-Amginsky Rural Okrug

Municipal status
  - Municipal district: Tattinsky Municipal District
  - Rural settlement: Sredne-Amginsky Rural Settlement
  - Capital of: Sredne-Amginsky Rural Settlement
- Time zone: UTC+
- Postal code: 678666
- OKTMO ID: 98604440101

Kharbalakh (Russian: Харбалах; Yakut: Харбалаах, Xarbalaax) is a rural locality (a selo), the only inhabited locality, and the administrative center of Sredne-Amginsky Rural Okrug of Tattinsky District in the Sakha Republic, Russia, located 46 kilometers (29 mi) from Ytyk-Kyuyol, the administrative center of the district. Its population as of the 2010 Census was 1,081, of whom 534 were male and 547 female, down from 1,103 as recorded during the 2002 Census.
