= Debdirge =

Debdirge Дебдирге
- Selo
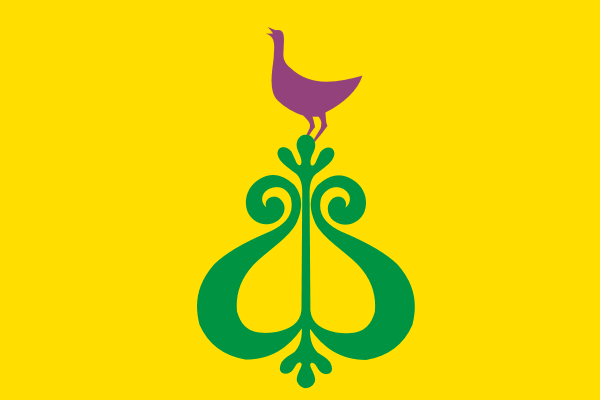
- Flag
- Interactive map of Debdirge
- Location of Debdirge Debdirge (Sakha Republic)
- Coordinates: 62°25′N 132°53′E
- Country: Russia
- Federal subject: Sakha Republic
- Administrative district: Tattinsky District
- Rural okrugSelsoviet: Igideysky Rural Okrug
- Founded: 1930

Government
  - Leader: Ruslan Zakharov

Population (2010 Census)
  - Total: 863
  - Estimate (2021): 753 (−12.7%)

Administrative status
  - Capital of: Igideysky Rural Okrug

Municipal status
  - Municipal district: Tattinsky Municipal District
  - Rural settlement: Igideysky Rural Settlement
  - Capital of: Igideysky Rural Settlement
- Time zone: UTC+
- Postal code: 678658
- OKTMO ID: 98604430101

Debdirge (Russian: Дебдирге; Yakut: Дэбдиргэ, Debdirge) is a rural locality (a selo), the only inhabited locality, and the administrative center of Igideysky Rural Okrug of Tattinsky District in the Sakha Republic, Russia, located 52 kilometers (32 mi) from Ytyk-Kyuyol, the administrative center of the district. Its population as of the 2010 Census was 863, up from 846 as recorded during the 2002 Census.
