= Khakhyyakh =

Khakhyyakh Хахыях Хахыйах (Yakut)
- Selo
- Interactive map of Khakhyyakh
- Location of Khakhyyakh Khakhyyakh (Sakha Republic)
- Coordinates: 61°44′27″N 133°39′48″E
- Country: Russia
- Federal subject: Sakha Republic
- Administrative district: Churapchinsky District
- Rural okrugSelsoviet: Solovyevsky Rural Okrug

Population (2010 Census)
  - Total: 72
  - Estimate (2021): 72 (0%)

Municipal status
  - Municipal district: Churapchinsky Municipal District
  - Rural settlement: Solovyevsky Rural Settlement
- Time zone: UTC+
- Postal code: 678679
- OKTMO ID: 98658435106

Khakhyyakh (Russian: Хахыях, Yakut: Хахыйах, Xaxıyax) is a rural locality (a selo), and one of two settlements in Solovyevsky Rural Okrug of Churapchinsky District in the Sakha Republic, Russia, in addition to Myryla, the administrative center of the Rural Okrug. It is located 118 kilometers (73 mi) from Churapcha, the administrative center of the district and 12 kilometers (7.5 mi) from Myryla. Its population as of the 2010 Census was 72; down from 89 recorded in the 2002 Census.
