= Dakky =

Dakky Даккы
- Selo
- Interactive map of Dakky
- Location of Dakky Dakky (Sakha Republic)
- Coordinates: 62°28′N 133°38′E
- Country: Russia
- Federal subject: Sakha Republic
- Administrative district: Tattinsky District
- Rural okrugSelsoviet: Zhokhsogonsky Rural Okrug

Population
  - Estimate (2002): 5 )

Municipal status
  - Municipal district: Tattinsky Municipal District
  - Rural settlement: Zhokhsogonsky Rural Settlement
- Time zone: UTC+
- Postal code: 678726
- OKTMO ID: 98604420106

Dakky (Russian: Даккы; Yakut: Даккы, Dakkı) is a rural locality (a selo), and one of two settlements in Zhokhsogonsky Rural Okrug of Tattinsky District in the Sakha Republic, Russia, in addition to Borobul, the administrative center of the Rural Okrug. It is located 11 kilometers (6.8 mi) from Ytyk-Kyuyol, the administrative center of the district and 21 kilometers (13 mi) from Borobul. Its population as of the 2002 Census was 5.
