= Maralayy =

Maralayy Маралайы
- Selo

Other transcription(s)
  - Yakut: Маралаайы
- Interactive map of Maralayy
- Location of Maralayy Maralayy (Sakha Republic)
- Coordinates: 61°59′N 131°55′E
- Country: Russia
- Federal subject: Sakha Republic
- Administrative district: Churapchinsky District
- Rural okrugSelsoviet: Mugudaysky Rural Okrug
- Founded: 1931

Population (2010 Census)
  - Total: 837

Administrative status
  - Capital of: Mugudaysky Rural Okrug

Municipal status
  - Municipal district: Churapchinsky Municipal District
  - Rural settlement: Mugudaysky Rural Settlement
  - Capital of: Mugudaysky Rural Settlement
- Time zone: UTC+9 (MSK+6)
- Postal code: 678682
- OKTMO ID: 98658425101

Maralayy (Russian: Маралайы; Yakut: Маралаайы, Maralaayı) is a rural locality (a selo), the only inhabited locality, and the administrative center of Mugudaysky Rural Okrug of Churapchinsky District in the Sakha Republic, Russia, located 33 kilometers (21 mi) from Churapcha, the administrative center of the district. Its population as of the 2010 Census was 837, up from 778 as recorded during the 2002 Census.
