= Chychymakh =

Chychymakh Чычымах
- Selo
- Interactive map of Chychymakh
- Location of Chychymakh Chychymakh (Sakha Republic)
- Coordinates: 62°07′N 134°21′E
- Country: Russia
- Federal subject: Sakha Republic
- Administrative district: Tattinsky District
- Rural okrugSelsoviet: Amginsky Rural Okrug
- Elevation: 247 m (810 ft)

Population (2010 Census)
  - Total: 773
  - Estimate (2021): 666 (−13.8%)

Administrative status
  - Capital of: Amginsky Rural Okrug

Municipal status
  - Municipal district: Tattinsky Municipal District
  - Rural settlement: Amginsky Rural Settlement
  - Capital of: Amginsky Rural Settlement
- Time zone: UTC+
- Postal code: 678656
- OKTMO ID: 98604410101

Chychymakh (Russian: Чычымах; Yakut: Чычымах, Çıçımax) is a rural locality (a selo), the only inhabited locality, and the administrative center of Amginsky Rural Okrug of Tattinsky District in the Sakha Republic, Russia, located 60 kilometers (37 mi) from Ytyk-Kyuyol, the administrative center of the district. Its population as of the 2010 Census was 773, down from 798 recorded during the 2002 Census.
