= Arylakh, Churapchinsky District, Sakha Republic =

Arylakh Арылах
- Selo
- Interactive map of Arylakh
- Location of Arylakh Arylakh (Sakha Republic)
- Coordinates: 62°22′N 131°36′E
- Country: Russia
- Federal subject: Sakha Republic
- Administrative district: Churapchinsky District
- Rural okrugSelsoviet: Arylakhsky Rural Okrug

Population (2010 Census)
  - Total: 348
  - Estimate (2021): 297 (−14.7%)

Administrative status
  - Capital of: Arylakhsky Rural Okrug

Municipal status
  - Municipal district: Churapchinsky Municipal District
  - Rural settlement: Arylakhsky Rural Settlement
  - Capital of: Arylakhsky Rural Settlement
- Time zone: UTC+
- Postal code: 678691
- OKTMO ID: 98658423101

Arylakh (Russian: Арылах; Yakut: Арыылаах, Arıılaax) is a rural locality (a selo), the only inhabited locality, and the administrative center of Arylakhsky Rural Okrug of Churapchinsky District in the Sakha Republic, Russia, located 68 kilometers (42 mi) from Churapcha, the administrative center of the district. Its population as of the 2010 Census was 348, down from 401 as recorded during the 2002 Census.
