= Tomtor, Tattinsky District, Sakha Republic =

Tomtor Томтор
- Selo
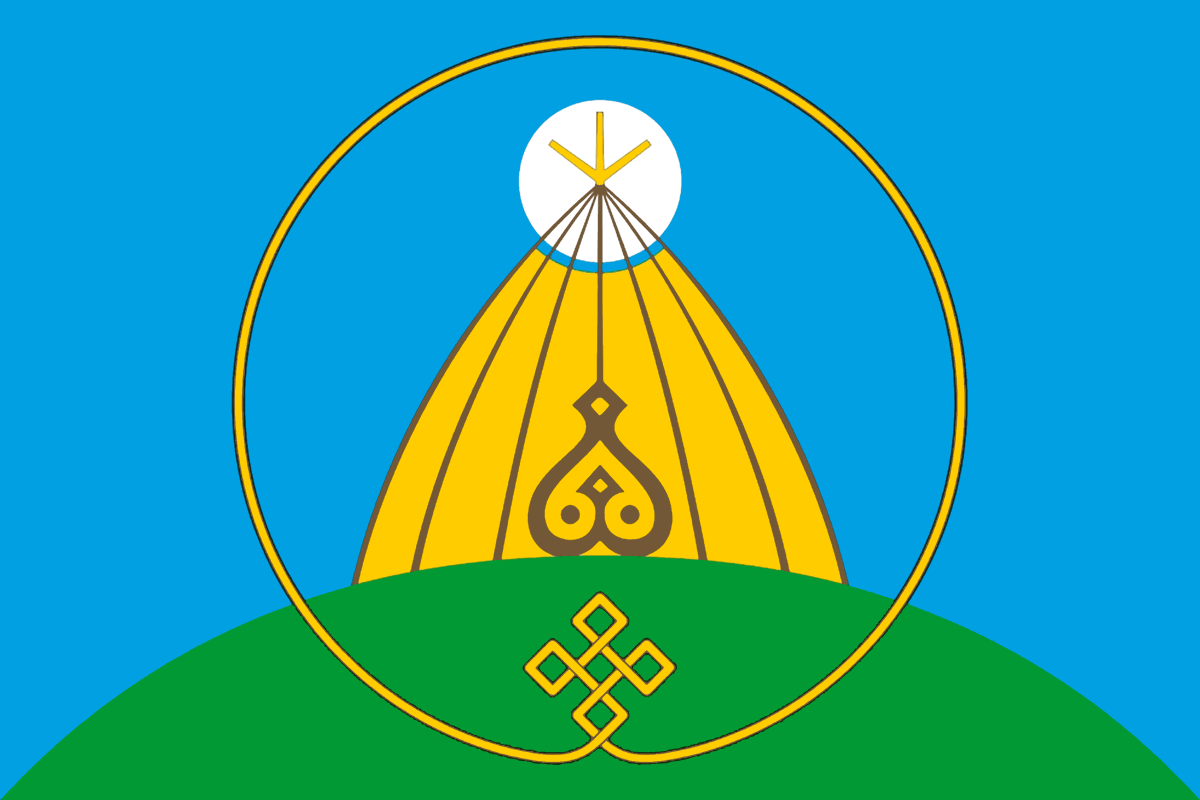
- Flag
- Interactive map of Tomtor
- Location of Tomtor Tomtor (Sakha Republic)
- Coordinates: 62°39′N 132°56′E
- Country: Russia
- Federal subject: Sakha Republic
- Administrative district: Tattinsky District
- Rural okrugSelsoviet: Bayaginsky Rural Okrug

Population (2010 Census)
  - Total: 1,051
  - Estimate (2021): 925 (−12%)

Administrative status
  - Capital of: Bayaginsky Rural Okrug

Municipal status
  - Municipal district: Tattinsky Municipal District
  - Rural settlement: Bayaginsky Rural Settlement
  - Capital of: Bayaginsky Rural Settlement
- Time zone: UTC+
- Postal code: 678643
- OKTMO ID: 98604415101

Tomtor (Russian: Томтор; Yakut: Томтор) is a rural locality (a selo), the only inhabited locality, and the administrative center of Bayaginsky Rural Okrug of Tattinsky District in the Sakha Republic, Russia, located 60 kilometers (37 mi) from Ytyk-Kyuyol, the administrative center of the district. Its population as of the 2010 Census was 1,051, of whom 519 were male and 532 female, up from 1,013 as recorded during the 2002 Census.
