= Kharbala 1-ya =

Kharbala 1-ya Харбала 1-я
- Selo
- Interactive map of Kharbala 1-ya
- Location of Kharbala 1-ya Kharbala 1-ya (Sakha Republic)
- Coordinates: 61°59′N 132°34′E
- Country: Russia
- Federal subject: Sakha Republic
- Administrative district: Churapchinsky District
- Rural okrugSelsoviet: Khatylinsky Rural Okrug
- Founded: 1908

Population (2010 Census)
  - Total: 704
  - Estimate (2021): 755 (+7.2%)

Administrative status
  - Capital of: Khatylinsky Rural Okrug

Municipal status
  - Municipal district: Churapchinsky Municipal District
  - Rural settlement: Khatylinsky Rural Settlement
  - Capital of: Khatylinsky Rural Settlement
- Time zone: UTC+
- Postal code: 678685
- OKTMO ID: 98658450101

Kharbala 1-ya (Russian: Харбала 1-я; Yakut: Маҥнайгы Харбала, Maŋnaygı Xarbala) is a rural locality (a selo), the only inhabited locality, and the administrative center of Khatylinsky Rural Okrug of Churapchinsky District in the Sakha Republic, Russia, located 9 kilometers (5.6 mi) from Churapcha, the administrative center of the district. Its population as of the 2010 Census was 704, down from 718 as recorded during the 2002 Census.

== Geography ==
The village is located in a flat area by river Tatta.
