= Daya-Amgata =

Daya-Amgata Дайа-Амгата
- Selo
- Interactive map of Daya-Amgata
- Location of Daya-Amgata Daya-Amgata (Sakha Republic)
- Coordinates: 61°54′N 133°37′E
- Country: Russia
- Federal subject: Sakha Republic
- Administrative district: Tattinsky District
- Rural okrugSelsoviet: Daya-Amginsky Rural Okrug
- Elevation: 136 m (446 ft)

Population (2010 Census)
  - Total: 227
  - Estimate (2021): 221 (−2.6%)

Administrative status
  - Capital of: Daya-Amginsky Rural Okrug

Municipal status
  - Municipal district: Tattinsky Municipal District
  - Rural settlement: Daya-Amginsky Rural Settlement
  - Capital of: Daya-Amginsky Rural Settlement
- Time zone: UTC+
- Postal code: 678661
- OKTMO ID: 98604418101

Daya-Amgata (Russian: Дайа-Амгата; Yakut: Даайа Аммата, Daaya Ammata) is a rural locality (a selo), the only inhabited locality, and the administrative center of Daya-Amginsky Rural Okrug of Tattinsky District in the Sakha Republic, Russia, located 78 kilometers (48 mi) from Ytyk-Kyuyol, the administrative center of the district. Its population as of the 2010 Census was 227, of whom 104 were male and 123 female, up from 207 as recorded during the 2002 Census.
