= Cherkyokh =

Cherkyokh Черкёх
- Selo

Other transcription(s)
  - Yakut: Чөркөөх
- Interactive map of Cherkyokh
- Location of Cherkyokh Cherkyokh (Sakha Republic)
- Coordinates: 62°11′N 133°14′E
- Country: Russia
- Federal subject: Sakha Republic
- Administrative district: Tattinsky District
- Rural okrugSelsoviet: Oktyabrsky Rural Okrug

Population (2010 Census)
  - Total: 1,257
  - Estimate (2021): 1,122 (−10.7%)

Administrative status
  - Capital of: Oktyabrsky Rural Okrug

Municipal status
  - Municipal district: Tattinsky Municipal District
  - Rural settlement: Oktyabrsky Rural Settlement
  - Capital of: Oktyabrsky Rural Settlement
- Time zone: UTC+
- Postal code: 678661
- OKTMO ID: 98604435101

Cherkyokh (Russian: Черкёх; Yakut: Чөркөөх, romanized: Çörkööx) is a rural locality (a selo) and the administrative center of Oktyabrsky Rural Okrug of Tattinsky District in the Sakha Republic, Russia, located 33 kilometers (21 mi) from Ytyk-Kyuyol, the administrative center of the district. Its population as of the 2010 Census was 1,257, down from 1,264 recorded during the 2002 Census.

== Geography ==
The village is located in a flat area by river Tatta.
