= Tolon, Chakyrsky Rural Okrug, Churapchinsky District, Sakha Republic =

Tolon Толон
- Selo
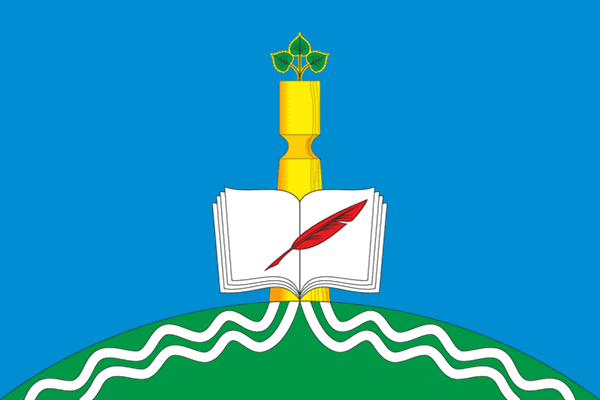
- Flag
- Interactive map of Tolon
- Location of Tolon Tolon (Sakha Republic)
- Coordinates: 61°39′N 132°05′E
- Country: Russia
- Federal subject: Sakha Republic
- Administrative district: Churapchinsky District
- Rural okrugSelsoviet: Chakyrsky Rural Okrug

Population (2010 Census)
  - Total: 598
  - Estimate (2021): 577 (−3.5%)

Administrative status
  - Capital of: Chakyrsky Rural Okrug

Municipal status
  - Municipal district: Churapchinsky Municipal District
  - Rural settlement: Chakyrsky Rural Settlement
  - Capital of: Chakyrsky Rural Settlement
- Time zone: UTC+
- Postal code: 678683
- OKTMO ID: 98658465101

Tolon (Russian: Толон; Yakut: Толоон, Toloon) is a rural locality (a selo), the only inhabited locality, and the administrative center of Chakyrsky Rural Okrug of Churapchinsky District in the Sakha Republic, Russia, located 59 kilometers (37 mi) from Churapcha, the administrative center of the district. Its population as of the 2010 Census was 598, up from 559 as recorded during the 2002 Census.

== Geography ==
The village is located in a flat area by river Tatta.
