= Yuryung-Kyuyol =

Yuryung-Kyuyol Юрюнг-Кюёль Үрүҥ Күөл (Yakut)
- Selo
- Interactive map of Yuryung-Kyuyol
- Location of Yuryung-Kyuyol Yuryung-Kyuyol (Sakha Republic)
- Coordinates: 61°45′30″N 132°00′47″E
- Country: Russia
- Federal subject: Sakha Republic
- Administrative district: Churapchinsky District
- Rural okrugSelsoviet: Khadarsky Rural Okrug

Population (2010 Census)
  - Total: 564
  - Estimate (2021): 571 (+1.2%)

Administrative status
  - Capital of: Khadarsky Rural Okrug

Municipal status
  - Municipal district: Churapchinsky Municipal District
  - Rural settlement: Khadarsky Rural Settlement
  - Capital of: Khadarsky Rural Settlement
- Time zone: UTC+
- Postal code: 678692
- OKTMO ID: 98658445101

Yuryung-Kyuyol (Russian: Юрюнг-Кюёль; Yakut: Үрүҥ Күөл, romanized: Ürüñ Küöl) is a rural locality (a selo) and the administrative center of Khadarsky Rural Okrug in Churapchinsky District of the Sakha Republic, Russia, located 40 kilometers (25 mi) from Churapcha, the administrative center of the district. Its population as of the 2010 Census was 564; up from 537 recorded in the 2002 Census.
