= Tuora-Kyuyol, Churapchinsky District, Sakha Republic =

Tuora-Kyuyol Туора-Кюёль
- Selo
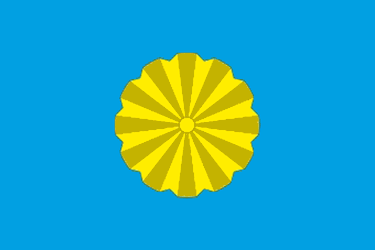
- Flag
- Interactive map of Tuora-Kyuyol
- Location of Tuora-Kyuyol Tuora-Kyuyol (Sakha Republic)
- Coordinates: 61°44′N 131°56′E
- Country: Russia
- Federal subject: Sakha Republic
- Administrative district: Churapchinsky District
- Rural okrugSelsoviet: Khayakhsytsky Rural Okrug

Population (2010 Census)
  - Total: 553
  - Estimate (2021): 526 (−4.9%)

Administrative status
  - Capital of: Khayakhsytsky Rural Okrug

Municipal status
  - Municipal district: Churapchinsky Municipal District
  - Rural settlement: Khayakhsytsky Rural Settlement
  - Capital of: Khayakhsytsky Rural Settlement
- Time zone: UTC+
- Postal code: 678687
- OKTMO ID: 98658455101

Tuora-Kyuyol (Russian: Туора-Кюёль; Yakut: Туора Күөл, Tuora Küöl) is a rural locality (a selo), the only inhabited locality, and the administrative center of Khayakhsytsky Rural Okrug of Churapchinsky District in the Sakha Republic, Russia, located 47 kilometers (29 mi) from Churapcha, the administrative center of the district. Its population as of the 2010 Census was 553, down from 633 recorded during the 2002 Census.
