= Tatta =

Tatta Yakut: Таатта
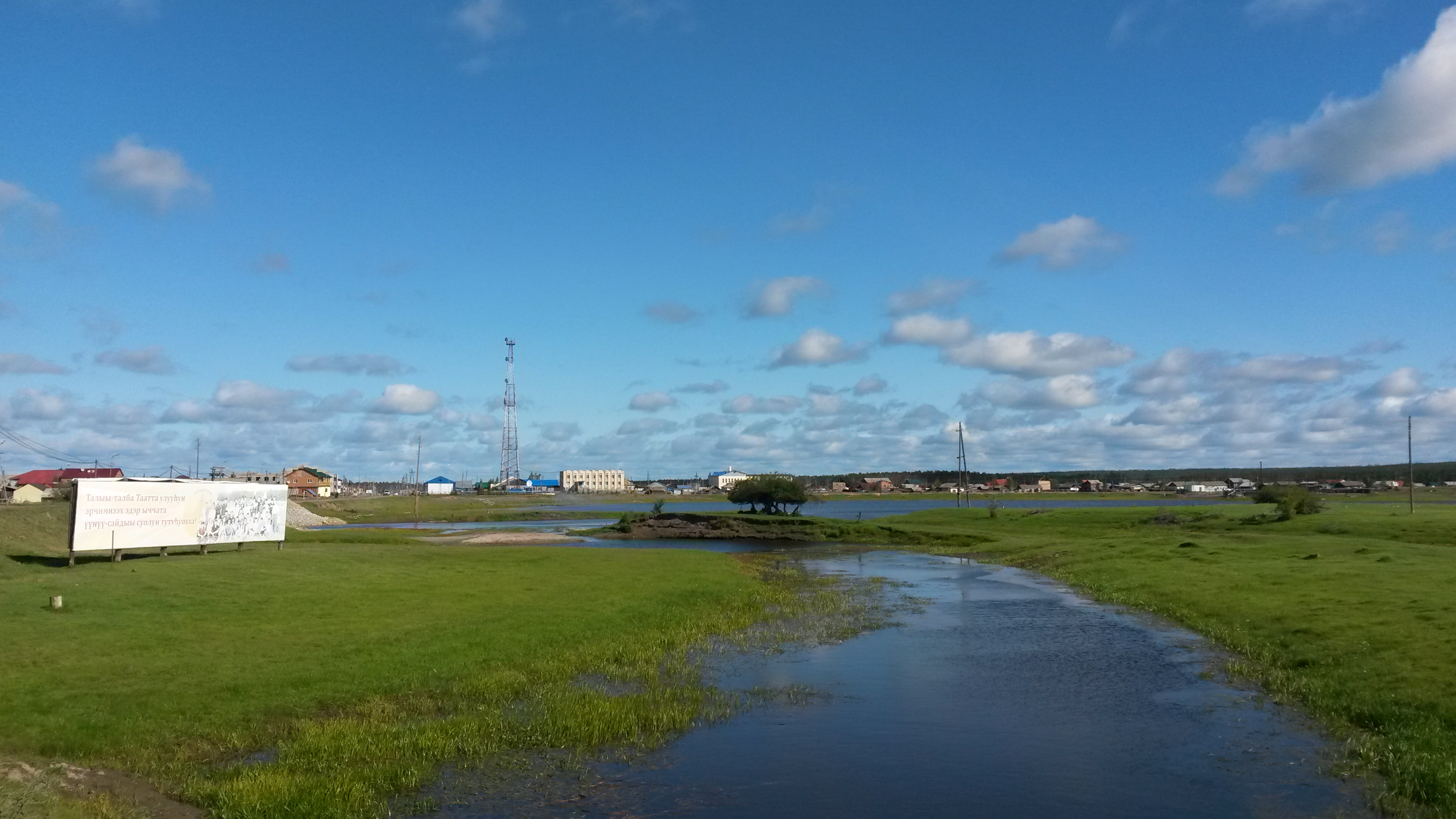
- A branch of the Tatta at Ytyk-Kyuyol

- Mouth location in Yakutia, Russia

Location
- Country: Russian Federation

Physical characteristics
- Source: Lena Plateau
  - coordinates: 61°37′07″N 131°57′29″E
- Mouth: Aldan River
  - coordinates: 63°01′10″N 133°24′23″E
- Length: 414 km (257 mi)
- Basin size: 10,200 km^{2} (3,900 sq mi)
- Discharge
  - average: 5 m^{3}/s (180 cu ft/s) (middle)

Basin features
- Progression: Aldan→ Lena→ Laptev Sea

The Tatta (Russian: Татта; Yakut: Таатта, Taatta) is a river in the Sakha Republic (Yakutia), Russia, a left tributary of the Aldan, part of the Lena basin.

The Tatta has a length of 414 kilometres (257 mi) and a drainage basin area of 10,200 square kilometres (3,900 mi^{2}). There are many inhabited places close to the banks of the Tatta, especially in its upper and middle reaches, including Churapcha and Ytyk-Kyuyol towns, as well as Uolba, Bulun, Dyabyla, Kharbala 1st, Kharbala 2nd, Cherkyokh, Borobul and Tolon villages.

Tatta District of the Sakha Republic was named after the river. The R504 Kolyma Highway crosses the Tatta roughly in the middle of its course.

== Course ==
The Tatta originates in the eastern slopes of the Lena Plateau and is the 7th longest tributary of the Aldan. It flows roughly northwards across a wide, flat valley marked by permafrost and thermokarst zones.

The source of the river and the first 10 km (6.2 mi) of its course lie in the Amga District where the river flows in a northeastern direction, which continues further on across the entire Churapcha District. In its lower course the Tatta bends northwards east of Churapcha town and enters the Tatta District flowing slowly and meandering until its mouth.

The Tatta meets the left side of the Aldan very near the mouth of the Baray on the facing bank, 271 km (168 mi) from its confluence with the Lena.

The main tributaries of the Tatta are the 58 km (36 mi) long Khondu from the right, as well as the 56 km (35 mi) long North Namara and 80 km (50 mi) long Kutalakh from the left. There are about 2,300 lakes in the Tatta basin. One of them Ytyk-Kyuyol, meaning "sacred lake" in the Yakut language, gives its name to Ytyk-Kyuyol, the seat of the Tatta District. Another important lake in the river basin is Churapcha Lake, a protected area.

The Tatta basin has a harsh continental climate, with long, cold winters. The river freezes in October and stays frozen until the second half of May.

Compared to other watercourses in Yakutia, the Tatta is not a mighty river. It has a rather feeble water discharge and in dry years the river may dry up in the summer. However, there are years in which it may cause disastrous floods.

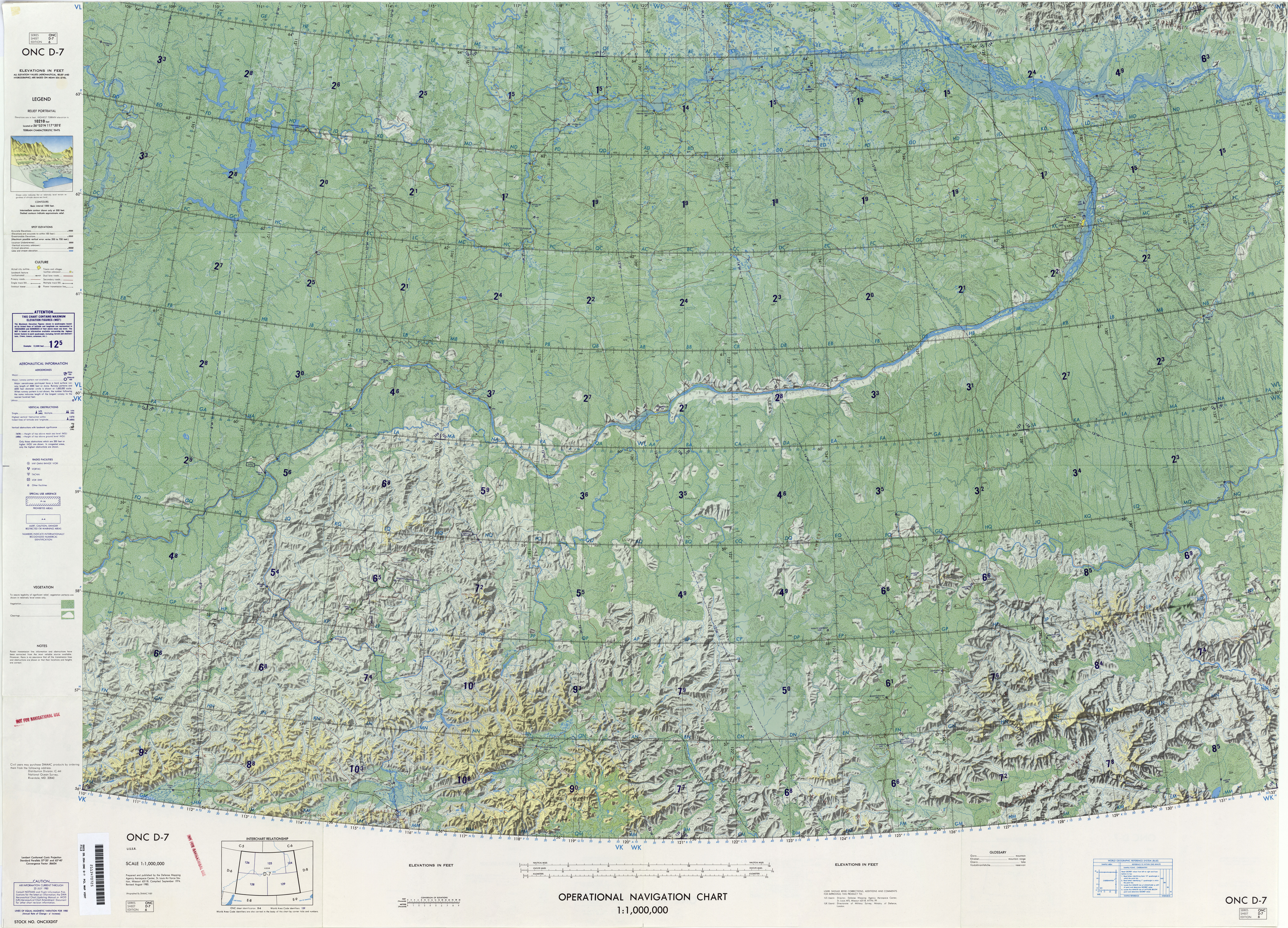
Operational Navigation Chart including the course of the Tatta on the upper right.

== See also ==
- List of rivers of Russia
- Central Yakutian Lowland
