= Tuora-Kyuyol, Tattinsky District, Sakha Republic =

Tuora-Kyuyol Туора-Кюёль
- Selo
- Interactive map of Tuora-Kyuyol
- Location of Tuora-Kyuyol Tuora-Kyuyol (Sakha Republic)
- Coordinates: 62°19′N 132°56′E
- Country: Russia
- Federal subject: Sakha Republic
- Administrative district: Tattinsky District
- Rural okrugSelsoviet: Zhuleysky Rural Okrug

Population (2010 Census)
  - Total: 597
  - Estimate (2021): 550 (−7.9%)

Administrative status
  - Capital of: Zhuleysky Rural Okrug

Municipal status
  - Municipal district: Tattinsky Municipal District
  - Rural settlement: Zhuleysky Rural Settlement
  - Capital of: Zhuleysky Rural Settlement
- Time zone: UTC+
- Postal code: 678652
- OKTMO ID: 98604425101

Tuora-Kyuyol (Russian: Туора-Кюёль; Yakut: Туора Күөл, Tuora Küöl) is a rural locality (a selo), the only inhabited locality, and the administrative center of Zhuleysky Rural Okrug of Tattinsky District in the Sakha Republic, Russia, located 35 kilometers (22 mi) from Ytyk-Kyuyol, the administrative center of the district. Its population as of the 2010 Census was 597, of whom 298 were male and 299 female, down from 620 as recorded during the 2002 Census.
