= Myndagay =

Myndagay Мындагай
- Selo

Other transcription(s)
  - Sakha: Мындаҕаайы
- Interactive map of Myndagay
- Location of Myndagay Myndagay (Sakha Republic)
- Coordinates: 61°38′N 133°12′E
- Country: Russia
- Federal subject: Sakha Republic
- Administrative district: Churapchinsky District
- Rural okrugSelsoviet: Bolugursky Rural Okrug
- Founded: 1900
- Elevation: 293 m (961 ft)

Population (2010 Census)
  - Total: 1,046
  - Estimate (2023): 1,094 (+4.6%)

Administrative status
  - Capital of: Bolugursky Rural Okrug

Municipal status
  - Municipal district: Churapchinsky Municipal District
  - Rural settlement: Bolugursky Rural Settlement
  - Capital of: Bolugursky Rural Settlement
- Time zone: UTC+
- Postal code: 678677
- OKTMO ID: 98658415101

Myndagay (Russian: Мындагай; Yakut: Мындаҕаайы, Mındağaayı) is a rural locality (a selo) and the administrative center of Bolugursky Rural Okrug in Churapchinsky District of the Sakha Republic, Russia, located 70 kilometers (43 mi) from Churapcha, the administrative center of the district. Its population as of the 2010 Census was 1,046; down from 1,128 recorded in the 2002 Census.
