= Tattinsky District =

Tattinsky District Таттинский улус (Russian)
- District

Other transcription(s)
  - Sakha: Таатта улууhа
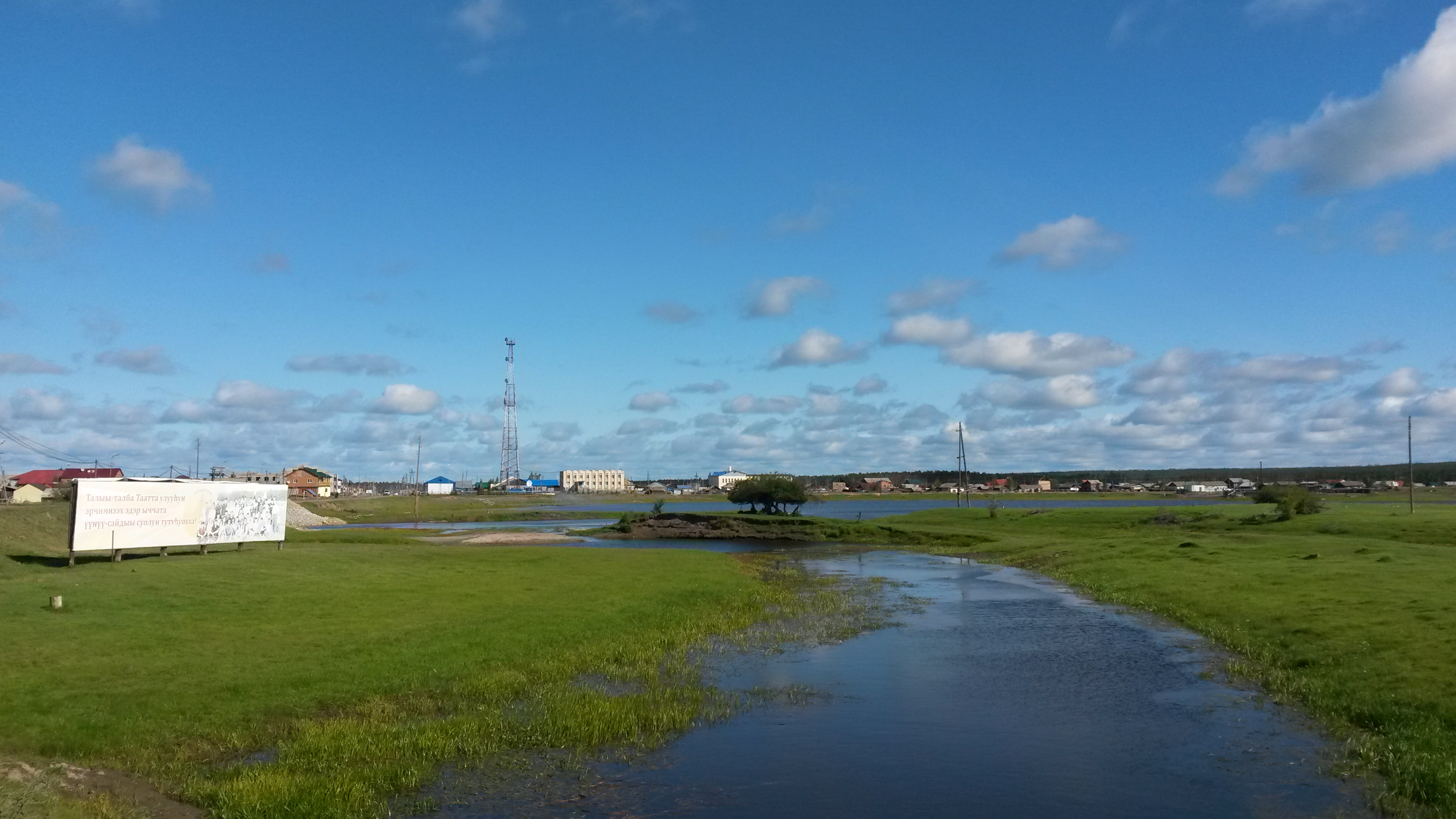
- Selo (village) of Ytyk-Kyuyol, Tattinsky District

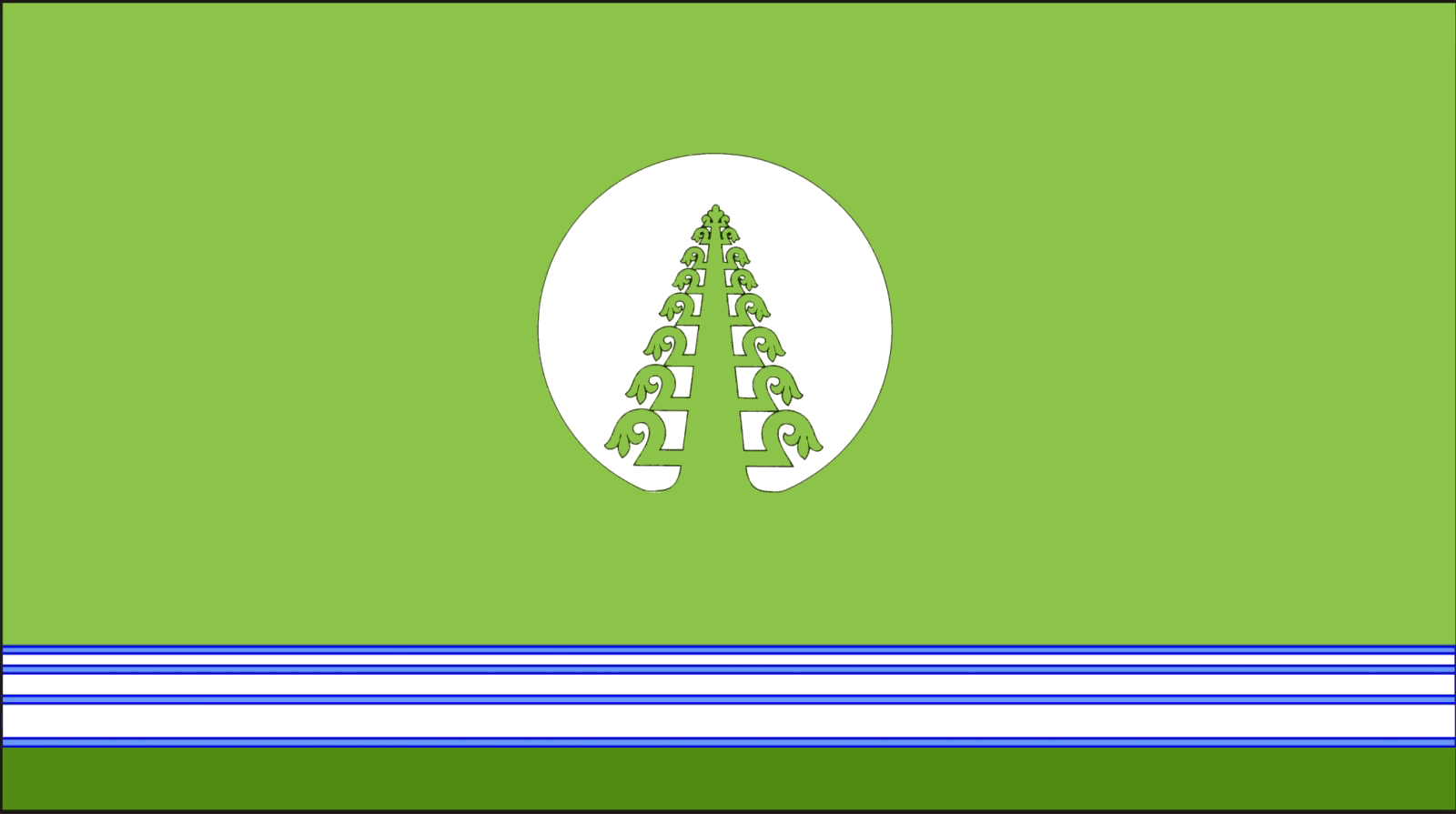
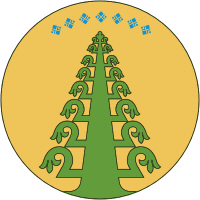
- Flag Coat of arms
- Location of Tattinsky District in the Sakha Republic
- Coordinates: 62°18′N 133°30′E
- Country: Russia
- Federal subject: Sakha Republic
- Established: May 25, 1930
- Administrative center: Ytyk-Kyuyol

Area
  - Total: 19,000 km^{2} (7,300 sq mi)

Population (2010 Census)
  - Total: 17,242
  - Density: 0.91/km^{2} (2.4/sq mi)
  - Urban: 0%
  - Rural: 100%

Administrative structure
  - Administrative divisions: 14 rural okrug
  - Inhabited localities: 15 rural localities

Municipal structure
  - Municipally incorporated as: Tattinsky Municipal District
  - Municipal divisions: 0 urban settlements, 14 rural settlements
- Time zone: UTC+
- OKTMO ID: 98604000
- Website: https://mr-tattinskij.sakha.gov.ru/

Tattinsky District (Russian: Таттинский улу́с; Yakut: Таатта улууһа, Taatta uluuha) is an administrative and municipal district (raion, or ulus), one of the thirty-four in the Sakha Republic, Russia. It is located in the eastern central part of the republic and borders with Tomponsky District in the north and east, Ust-Maysky District in the south, Churapchinsky District in the southwest, and with Ust-Aldansky District in the northwest. The area of the district is 19,000 square kilometers (7,300 sq mi). Its administrative center is the rural locality (a selo) of Ytyk-Kyuyol. Population: 17,242 (2010 census); 16,601 (2002 Census); 15,933 (1989 Soviet census). The population of Ytyk-Kyuyol accounts for 39.6% of the district's total population.

== Geography ==
The landscape of the district is mostly flat. Its main rivers include the Amga, the Aldan and the Tatta, a tributary of the latter.

=== Climate ===
Average January temperature ranges from −44 to −42 °C (−47 to −44 °F) and average July temperature is +18 °C (64 °F). Annual precipitation is 200–250 millimeters (7.9–9.8 in).

== History ==
The district was established on May 25, 1930. Until 1990, it was called Alexeyevsky (Алексе́евский).

== Demographics ==
As of the 2021 Census, the ethnic composition was as follows:

- Yakuts: 98.4%
- Evenks: 0.7%
- Russians: 0.3%
- other ethnicities: 0.6%

== Economy ==
The economy of the district is mostly based on agriculture.

== Inhabited localities ==
Municipal composition
Rural settlements	Population	Male	Female	Rural localities in jurisdiction*
Aldansky Nasleg (Алданский)	1,293	640 (49.5%)	653 (50.5%)	**selo of Bulun**
Amginsky Nasleg (Амгинский)	773	395 (51.1%)	378 (48.9%)	**selo of Chychymakh**
Bayaginsky Nasleg (Баягинский)	1,051	519 (49.4%)	532 (50.6%)	**selo of Tomtor**
Daya-Amginsky Nasleg (Дайа-Амгинский)	227	104 (45.8%)	123 (54.2%)	**selo of Daya-Amgata**
Zhokhsogonsky Nasleg (Жохсогонский)	1,023	495 (48.4%)	528 (51.6%)	**selo of Borobul**; selo of Dakky
Zhuleysky Nasleg (Жулейский)	597	298 (49.9%)	299 (50.1%)	**selo of Tuora-Kyuyol**
Igideysky Nasleg (Игидейский)	863	425 (49.2%)	438 (50.8%)	**selo of Debdirge**
Oktyabrsky Nasleg (Октябрьский)	1,257	633 (50.4%)	624 (49.6%)	**selo of Cherkyokh**
Sredne-Amginsky Nasleg (Средне-Амгинский)	1,081	534 (49.4%)	547 (50.6%)	**selo of Kharbalakh**
Tattinsky Nasleg (Таттинский)	6,828	3,245 (47.5%)	3,583 (52.5%)	**selo of Ytyk-Kyuyol** (administrative centre of the district)
Tyarasinsky Nasleg (Тыарасинский)	818	399 (48.8%)	419 (51.2%)	**selo of Kyyy**
Uolbinsky Nasleg (Уолбинский)	536	270 (50.4%)	266 (49.6%)	**selo of Uolba**
Ust-Amginsky Nasleg (Усть-Амгинский)	573	286 (49.9%)	287 (50.1%)	**selo of Chymnayi**
Khara-Aldansky Nasleg (Хара-Алданский)	322	154 (47.8%)	168 (52.2%)	**selo of Khara-Aldan**

Divisional source:
Population source:
*Administrative centers are shown in bold
