= Diring, Tyolyoysky Rural Okrug, Churapchinsky District, Sakha Republic =

Tyolyoy-Diring Тёлёй-Диринг Төлөй-Дириҥ (Yakut)
- Selo
- Interactive map of Tyolyoy-Diring
- Location of Tyolyoy-Diring Tyolyoy-Diring (Sakha Republic)
- Coordinates: 61°59′01″N 132°10′34″E
- Country: Russia
- Federal subject: Sakha Republic
- Administrative district: Churapchinsky District
- Rural okrugSelsoviet: Tyolyoysky Rural Okrug

Population (2010 Census)
  - Total: 506
  - Estimate (2021): 518 (+2.4%)

Administrative status
  - Capital of: Tyolyoysky Rural Okrug

Municipal status
  - Municipal district: Churapchinsky Municipal District
  - Rural settlement: Tyolyoysky Rural Settlement
  - Capital of: Tyolyoysky Rural Settlement
- Time zone: UTC+
- Postal code: 678665
- OKTMO ID: 98658442101

Tyolyoy-Diring (Russian: Тёлё́й-Дири́нг; Yakut: Төлөй-Дириҥ or simply Дириҥ, Tölöy-Diriŋ, Diriŋ) is a rural locality (a selo) and the administrative center of Tyolyoysky Rural Okrug in Churapchinsky District of the Sakha Republic, Russia, located 20 kilometers (12 mi) from Churapcha, the administrative center of the district. Its population as of the 2010 Census was 506; up from 399 recorded in the 2002 Census.
