= Tolon, Bakhsytsky Rural Okrug, Churapchinsky District, Sakha Republic =

Tolon Толон
- Selo
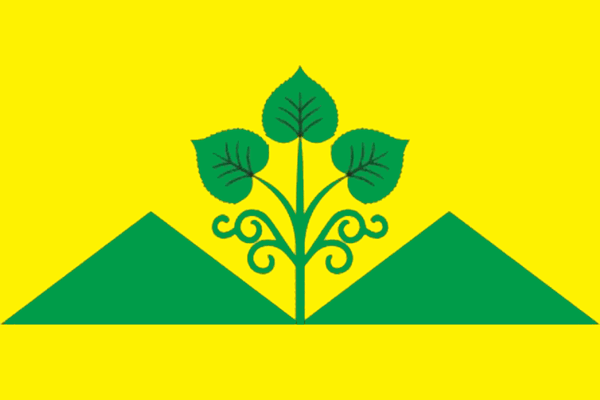
- Flag
- Interactive map of Tolon
- Location of Tolon Tolon (Sakha Republic)
- Coordinates: 62°18′N 131°33′E
- Country: Russia
- Federal subject: Sakha Republic
- Administrative district: Churapchinsky District
- Rural okrugSelsoviet: Bakhsytsky Rural Okrug
- Founded: 1939

Population (2010 Census)
  - Total: 414
  - Estimate (2021): 437 (+5.6%)

Administrative status
  - Capital of: Bakhsytsky Rural Okrug

Municipal status
  - Municipal district: Churapchinsky Municipal District
  - Rural settlement: Bakhsytsky Rural Settlement
  - Capital of: Bakhsytsky Rural Settlement
- Time zone: UTC+
- Postal code: 678690
- OKTMO ID: 98658407101

Tolon (Russian: Толон; Yakut: Толоон, Toloon) is a rural locality (a selo) and the administrative center of Bakhsytsky Rural Okrug in Churapchinsky District of the Sakha Republic, Russia, located 110 kilometers (68 mi) from Churapcha, the administrative center of the district. Its population as of the 2010 Census was 414; up from 410 recorded in the 2002 Census.
