= Diring, Khoptoginsky Rural Okrug, Churapchinsky District, Sakha Republic =

Diring Диринг Дириҥ (Yakut)
- Selo
- Interactive map of Diring
- Location of Diring Diring (Sakha Republic)
- Coordinates: 61°51′02″N 132°07′19″E
- Country: Russia
- Federal subject: Sakha Republic
- Administrative district: Churapchinsky District
- Rural okrugSelsoviet: Khoptoginsky Rural Okrug
- Elevation: 267 m (876 ft)

Population (2010 Census)
  - Total: 1,218
  - Estimate (2021): 1,066 (−12.5%)

Administrative status
  - Capital of: Khoptoginsky Rural Okrug

Municipal status
  - Municipal district: Churapchinsky Municipal District
  - Rural settlement: Khoptoginsky Rural Settlement
  - Capital of: Khoptoginsky Rural Settlement
- Time zone: UTC+
- Postal code: 678660
- OKTMO ID: 98658460101

Diring (Russian: Диринг; Yakut: Дириҥ, Diriŋ) is a rural locality (a selo) and the administrative center of Khoptoginsky Rural Okrug in Churapchinsky District of the Sakha Republic, Russia, located 25 kilometers (16 mi) from Churapcha, the administrative center of the district. Its population as of the 2010 Census was 1218; up from 1196 recorded in the 2002 Census.
