= Dyabyla =

Dyabyla Дябыла
- Selo
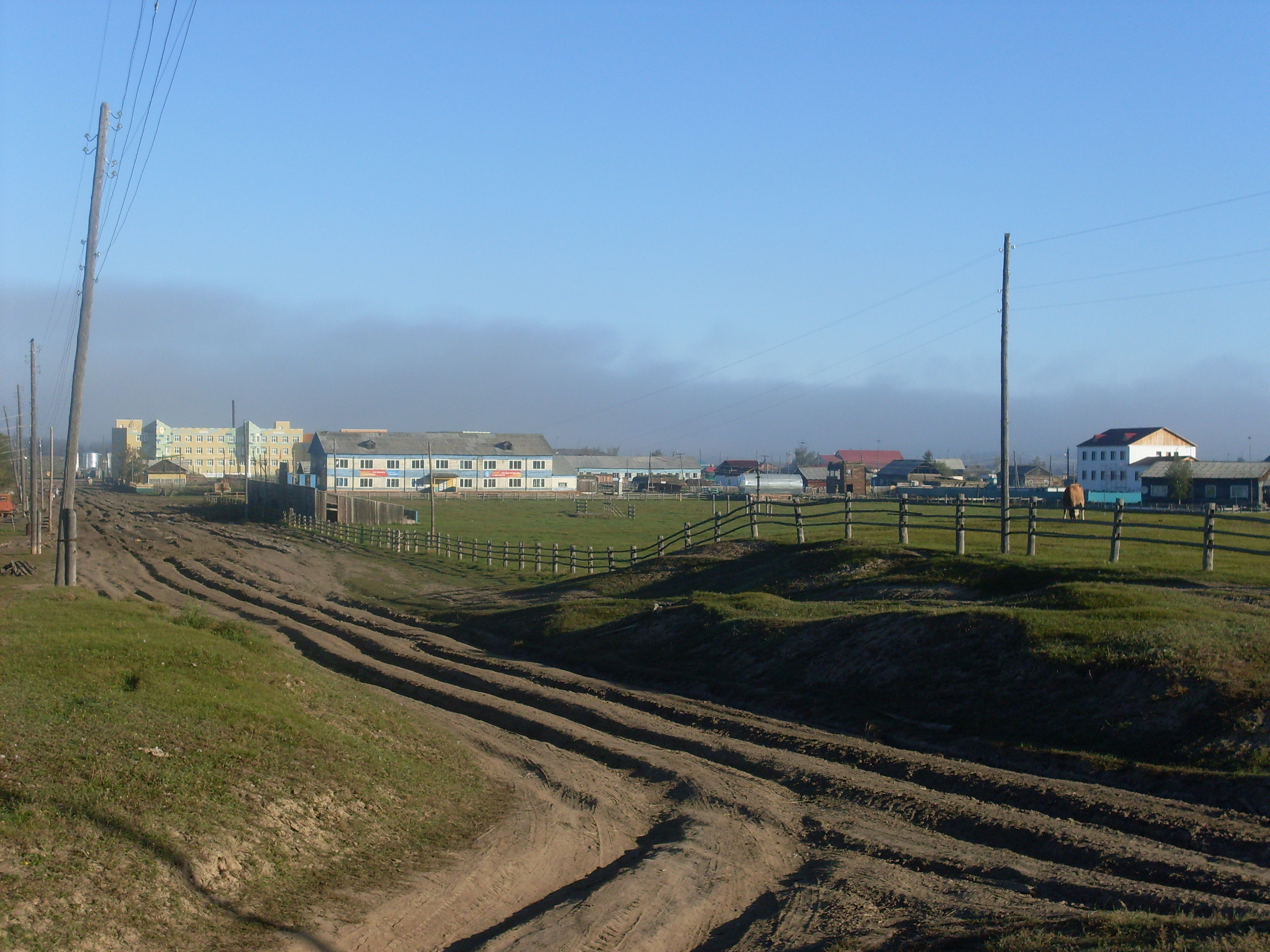
- School and hospital, Dybala
- Interactive map of Dyabyla
- Location of Dyabyla Dyabyla (Sakha Republic)
- Coordinates: 61°55′N 132°20′E
- Country: Russia
- Federal subject: Sakha Republic
- Administrative district: Churapchinsky District
- Rural okrugSelsoviet: Ozhulunsky Rural Okrug
- Founded: 1939

Population (2010 Census)
  - Total: 1,112
  - Estimate (2021): 995 (−10.5%)

Administrative status
  - Capital of: Ozhulunsky Rural Okrug

Municipal status
  - Municipal district: Churapchinsky Municipal District
  - Rural settlement: Ozhulunsky Rural Settlement
  - Capital of: Ozhulunsky Rural Settlement
- Time zone: UTC+
- Postal code: 678678
- OKTMO ID: 98658430101

Dyabyla (Russian: Дябыла; Yakut: Дьабыла, Cabıla) is a rural locality (a selo) and the administrative center of Ozhulunsky Rural Okrug in Churapchinsky District of the Sakha Republic, Russia, located 15 kilometers (9.3 mi) from Churapcha, the administrative center of the district. Its population as of the 2010 Census was 1,112; up from 1,042 recorded in the 2002 Census.

== Geography ==
The selo is located in a flat area by the Tatta river.
