= Churapchinsky District =

Churapchinsky District Чурапчинский улус (Russian)
- District

Other transcription(s)
  - Yakut: Чурапчы улууһа
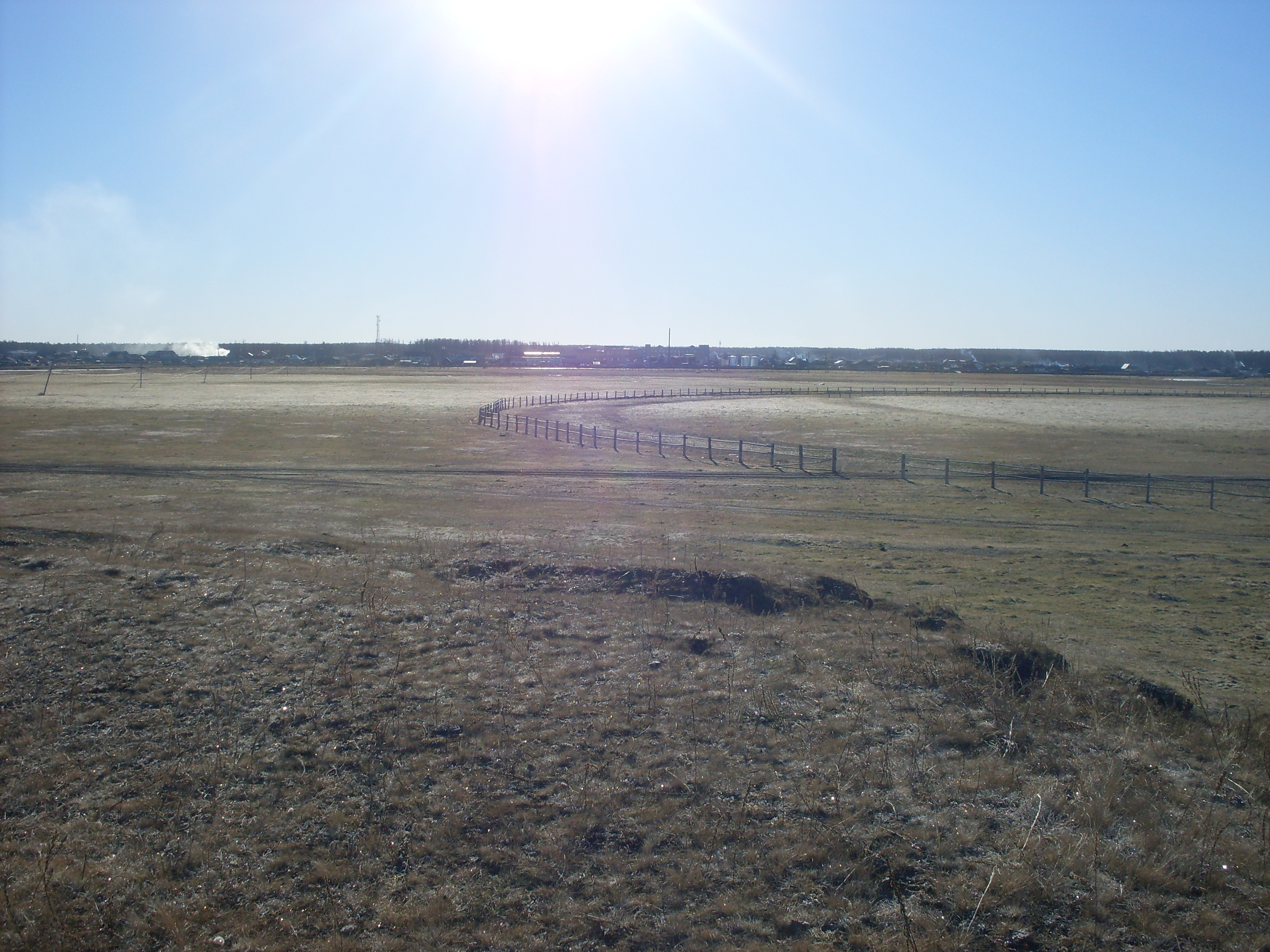
- The selo of Dyabyla in Churapchinsky District

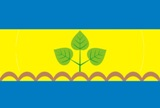
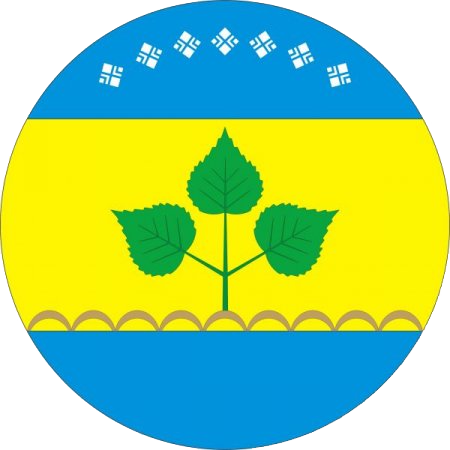
- Flag Coat of arms
- Location of Churapchinsky District in the Sakha Republic
- Coordinates: 62°00′N 132°26′E
- Country: Russia
- Federal subject: Sakha Republic
- Established: March 25, 1930
- Administrative center: Churapcha

Government
  - Type: Local government
  - Head: Stepan Sargydaev

Area
  - Total: 12,600 km^{2} (4,900 sq mi)

Population (2010 Census)
  - Total: 20,387
  - Density: 1.62/km^{2} (4.19/sq mi)
  - Urban: 0%
  - Rural: 100%

Administrative structure
  - Administrative divisions: 17 Rural okrugs
  - Inhabited localities: 30 rural localities

Municipal structure
  - Municipally incorporated as: Churapchinsky Municipal District
  - Municipal divisions: 0 urban settlements, 17 rural settlements
- Time zone: UTC+
- OKTMO ID: 98658000

Population of Churapchinsky District
- 2010 Census: 20,387
- 2002 Census: 19,466
- 1989 Census: 18,516
- 1979 Census: 16,203

Churapchinsky District (Russian: Чурапчинский улу́с; Yakut: Чурапчы улууһа, Çurapçı uluuha, Yakut pronunciation: [t͡ʃuɾapˈt͡ʃɯ uluːha]) is an administrative and municipal district (raion, or ulus), one of the thirty-four in the Sakha Republic, Russia. It is located in the center of the republic and borders Tattinsky District in the north, Ust-Maysky District in the east and southeast, Amginsky District in the south, Megino-Kangalassky District in the west, and Ust-Aldansky District in the northwest. The area of the district is 12,600 square kilometers (4,900 sq mi). Its administrative center is the rural locality (a selo) of Churapcha. As of the 2010 Census, the total population of the district was 20,387, with the population of Churapcha accounting for 43.0% of that number.

== Geography ==
The landscape of the district is mostly flat. The main rivers in the district are the Amga and the Tatta. There are many lakes in the district, the largest of which is Lake Churapcha.

Average January temperature is −42 °C (−44 °F) and average July temperature is +16 to +17 °C (61 to 63 °F). Average annual precipitation is about 200–250 millimeters (7.9–9.8 in).

== History ==
The district was established on March 25, 1930.

== Administrative and municipal status ==
Within the framework of administrative divisions, Churapchinsky District is one of the thirty-four in the republic. The district is divided into seventeen rural okrugs (naslegs) which comprise thirty rural localities. As a municipal division, the district is incorporated as Churapchinsky Municipal District. Its seventeen rural okrugs are incorporated into seventeen rural settlements within the municipal district. The selo of Churapcha serves as the administrative center of both the administrative and municipal district.

=== Inhabited localities ===
Administrative/municipal composition
Rural okrugs/Rural settlements	Population	Rural localities in jurisdiction*
Alagarsky (Алагарский)	728	**selo of Chyappara**
Arylakhsky (Арылахский)	348	**selo of Arylakh**
Bakhsytsky (Бахсытский)	414	**selo of Tolon**; selo of Lebiya
Boltoginsky (Болтогинский)	653	**selo of Kharbala 2-ya**; selo of Kyndal
Bolugursky (Болугурский)	1047	**selo of Myndagay**; selo of Kystyk-Kugda
Kytanakhsky (Кытанахский)	518	**selo of Kilyanki**
Mugudaysky (Мугудайский)	837	**selo of Maralayy**
Ozhulunsky (Ожулунский)	1187	**selo of Dyabyla**; selo of Vasily-Alasa; selo of Yuryakh-Kyuyore
Solovyevsky (Соловьевский)	579	**selo of Myryla**; selo of Khakhyyakh
Sylansky (Сыланский)	1061	**selo of Usun-Kyuyol**; selo of Berya; selo of Dyarla; selo of Ogusur; selo of Ulakhan-Kyuyol
Tyolyoysky (Тёлёйский)	506	**selo of Diring** (aka Tyolyoy-Diring); selo of Myandiye
Khadarsky (Хадарский)	614	**selo of Yuryung-Kyuyol**; selo of Uorga
Khatylinsky (Хатылинский)	704	**selo of Kharbala 1-ya**
Khayakhsytsky (Хаяхсытский)	553	**selo of Tuora-Kyuyol**
Khoptoginsky (Хоптогинский)	1271	**selo of Diring**; selo of Ulakhan-Ebya
Chakyrsky (Чакырский)	598	**selo of Tolon**
Churapchinsky (Чурапчинский)	8769	**selo of Churapcha** (administrative center of the district)

*Administrative centers are shown in bold

== Demographics ==
As of the 2021 Census, the ethnic composition was as follows:

- Yakuts: 98.7%
- Evenks: 0.6%
- Russians: 0.2%
- others: 0.5%

== Economy ==
Businesses in the district specialize mainly in agriculture and the raising of cattle and horses.
