= Usun-Kyuyol, Churapchinsky District, Sakha Republic =

Usun-Kyuyol Усун-Кюёль Уһун Күөл (Yakut)
- Selo
- Interactive map of Usun-Kyuyol
- Location of Usun-Kyuyol Usun-Kyuyol (Sakha Republic)
- Coordinates: 62°9′50″N 132°11′06″E
- Country: Russia
- Federal subject: Sakha Republic
- Administrative district: Churapchinsky District
- Rural okrugSelsoviet: Sylansky Rural Okrug
- Elevation: 184 m (604 ft)

Population (2010 Census)
  - Total: 751
  - Estimate (2021): 814 (+8.4%)

Administrative status
  - Capital of: Sylansky Rural Okrug

Municipal status
  - Municipal district: Churapchinsky Municipal District
  - Rural settlement: Sylansky Rural Settlement
  - Capital of: Sylansky Rural Settlement
- Time zone: UTC+
- Postal code: 678679
- OKTMO ID: 98658440101

Usun-Kyuyol (Russian: Усун-Кюёль; Yakut: Уһун Күөл, Uhun Küöl) is a rural locality (a selo) and the administrative center of Sylansky Rural Okrug in Churapchinsky District of the Sakha Republic, Russia, located 24 kilometers (15 mi) from Churapcha, the administrative center of the district. Its population as of the 2010 Census was 751; down from 863 recorded in the 2002 Census.
