= Ytyk-Kyuyol =

Ytyk-Kyuyol Ытык-Кюёль
- Selo

Other transcription(s)
  - Sakha: Ытык-Күөл
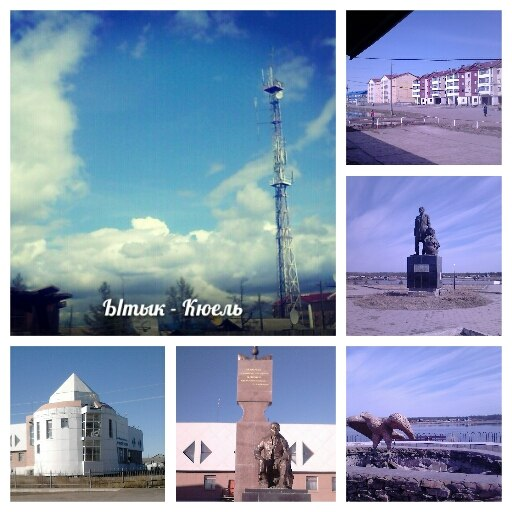
- Ytyk-Kyuyol

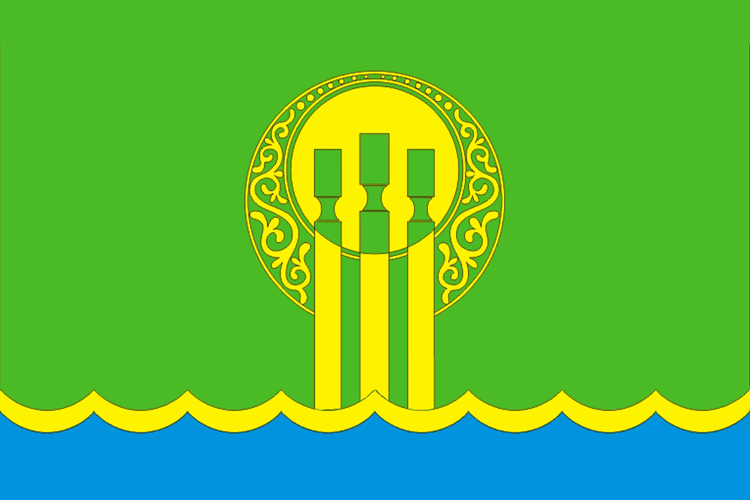
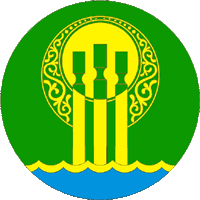
- Flag Coat of arms
- Interactive map of Ytyk-Kyuyol
- Location of Ytyk-Kyuyol Ytyk-Kyuyol (Sakha Republic)
- Coordinates: 62°23′N 133°34′E
- Country: Russia
- Federal subject: Sakha Republic
- Administrative district: Tattinsky District
- Rural okrugSelsoviet: Tattinsky Rural Okrug

Population (2010 Census)
  - Total: 6,828
  - Estimate (2016): 6,758 (−1%)

Administrative status
  - Capital of: Tattinsky District, Tattinsky Rural Okrug

Municipal status
  - Municipal district: Tattinsky Municipal District
  - Rural settlement: Tattinsky Rural Settlement
  - Capital of: Tattinsky Municipal District, Tattinsky Rural Settlement
- Time zone: UTC+
- Postal codes: 678650, 678669
- OKTMO ID: 98604445101

Ytyk-Kyuyol (Russian: Ытык-Кюёль; Yakut: Ытык-Күөл, romanized: Itık Küöl) is a rural locality (a selo) and the administrative center of Tattinsky District of the Sakha Republic, Russia, located on the left bank of the Tatta River (in the Aldan's basin), 255 kilometers (158 mi) from Yakutsk, the capital of the republic. As of the 2010 Census, its population was 6,828.

== Etymology ==
It is named for a nearby lake, whose name literally means "sacred lake" in the Yakut language. It is one of the few Russian words that begin with Ы.

== History ==
Ytyk-Kyuyol became the administrative center of the newly created Alexeyevsky District in 1930. The district was given its present name (after the Tatta River) in 1990.

Ytyk-Kyuyol is often affected by flooding, most recently on May 20, 2007, when 873 houses were submerged and more than 3,000 people had to be evacuated.

== Economy ==
An agricultural center, Ytyk-Kyuyol has developed cattle and horse breeding industries; growing of potatoes and other vegetables is also common. There is also some timber production.

Ytyk-Kyuyol is located on the R504 Kolyma Highway, allowing road access to Yakutsk.

== Demographics ==
Ytyk-Kyuyol population
- 2010 Census: 6,828
- 2002 Census: 6,267
- 1989 Census: 5,658
- 1979 Census: 4,118

Ethnic Yakuts make up over 95% of the population.

== Education ==
There are two middle-grade schools, a gymnasium, a music school, and a sports school, as well as the literary-artistic museum-reserve "Tatta".

== Gallery ==
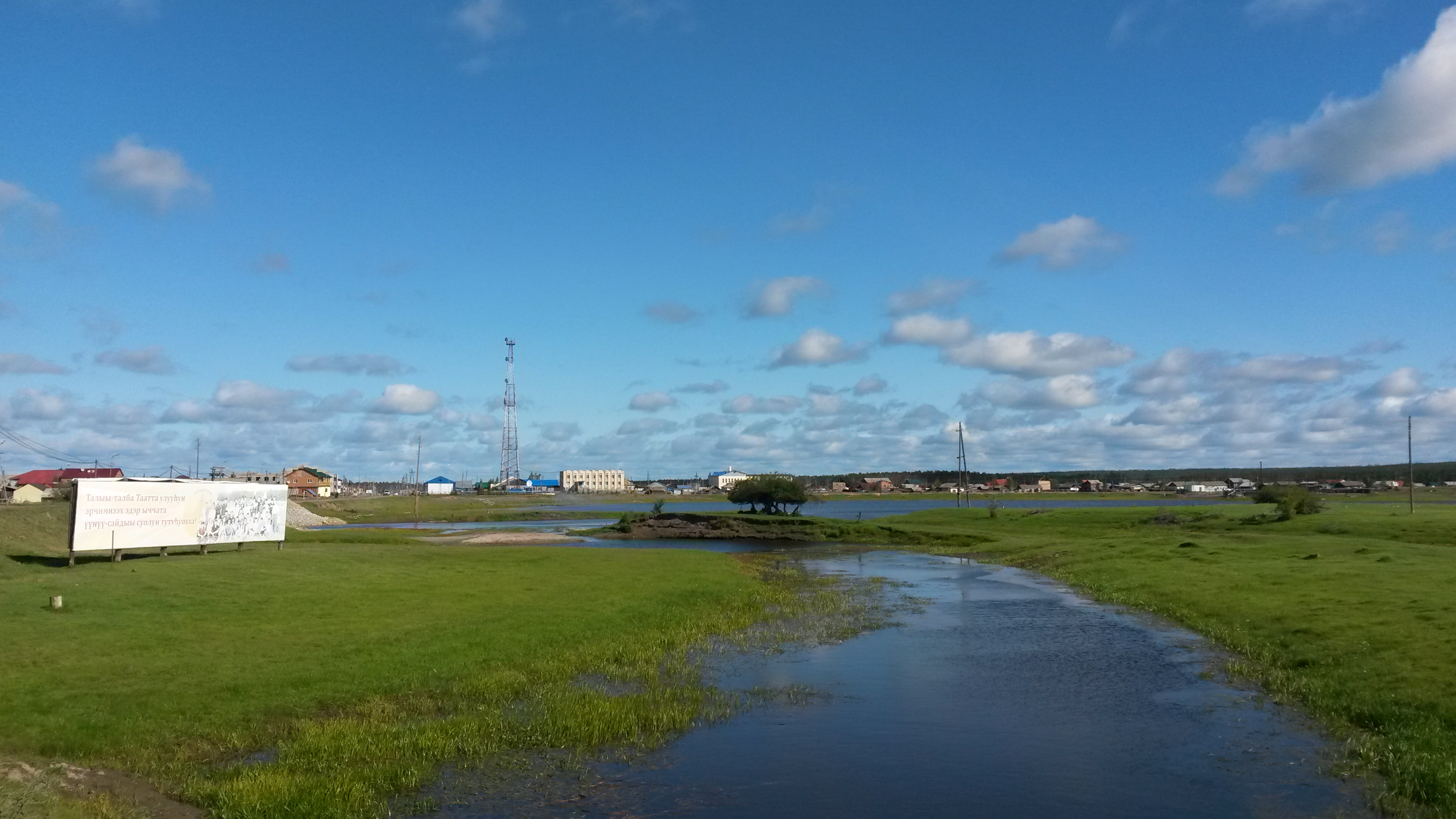
Ytyk-Kyuyol

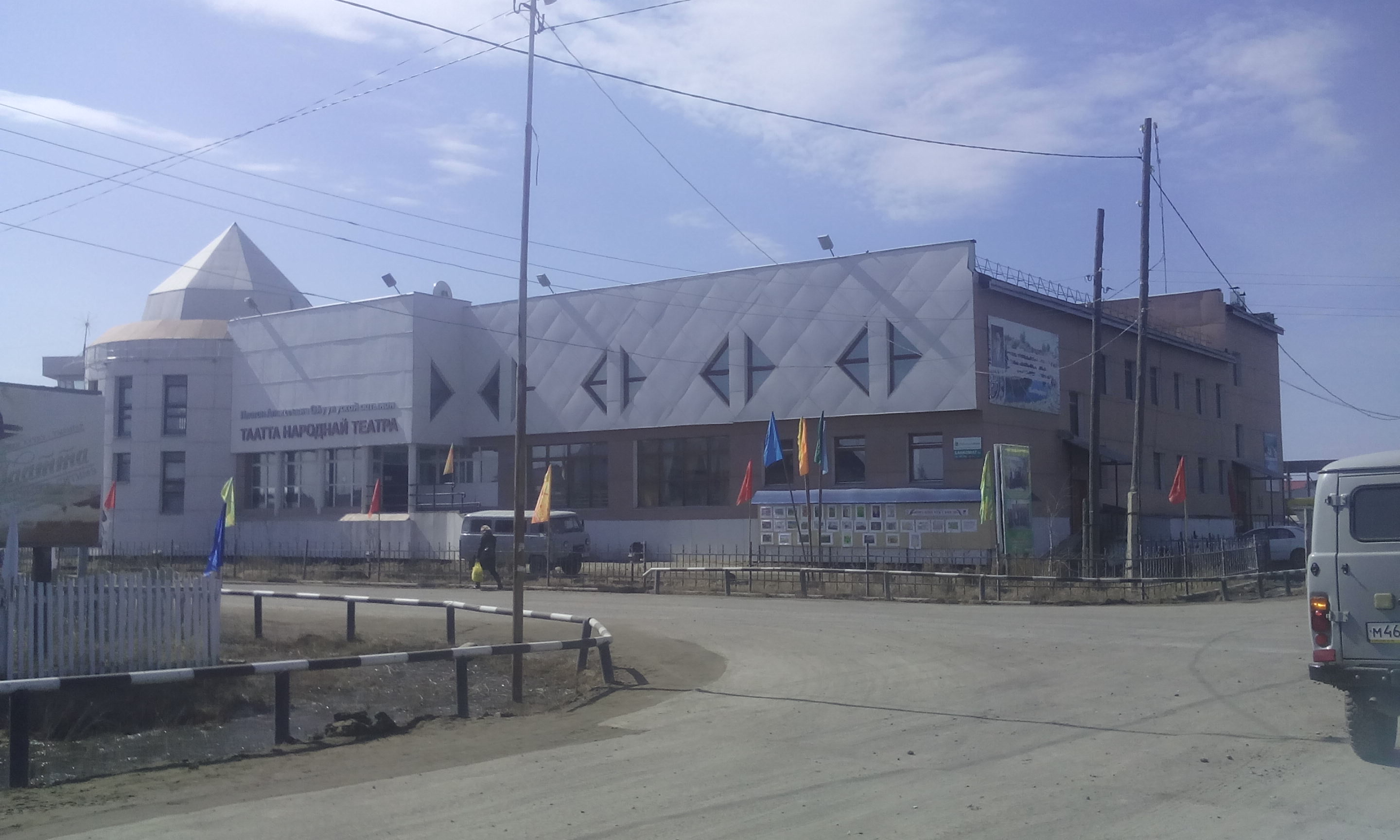
Theatre

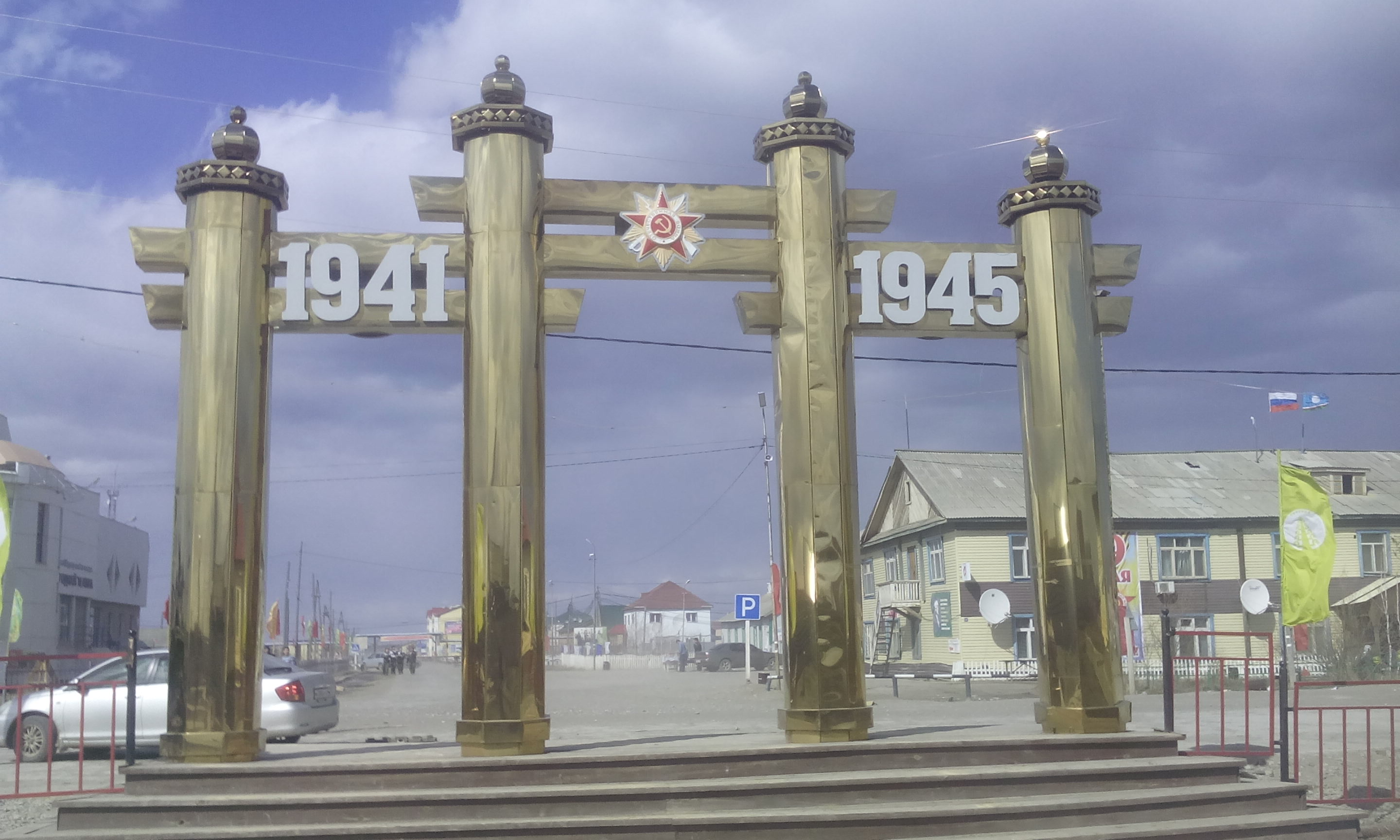
Monument

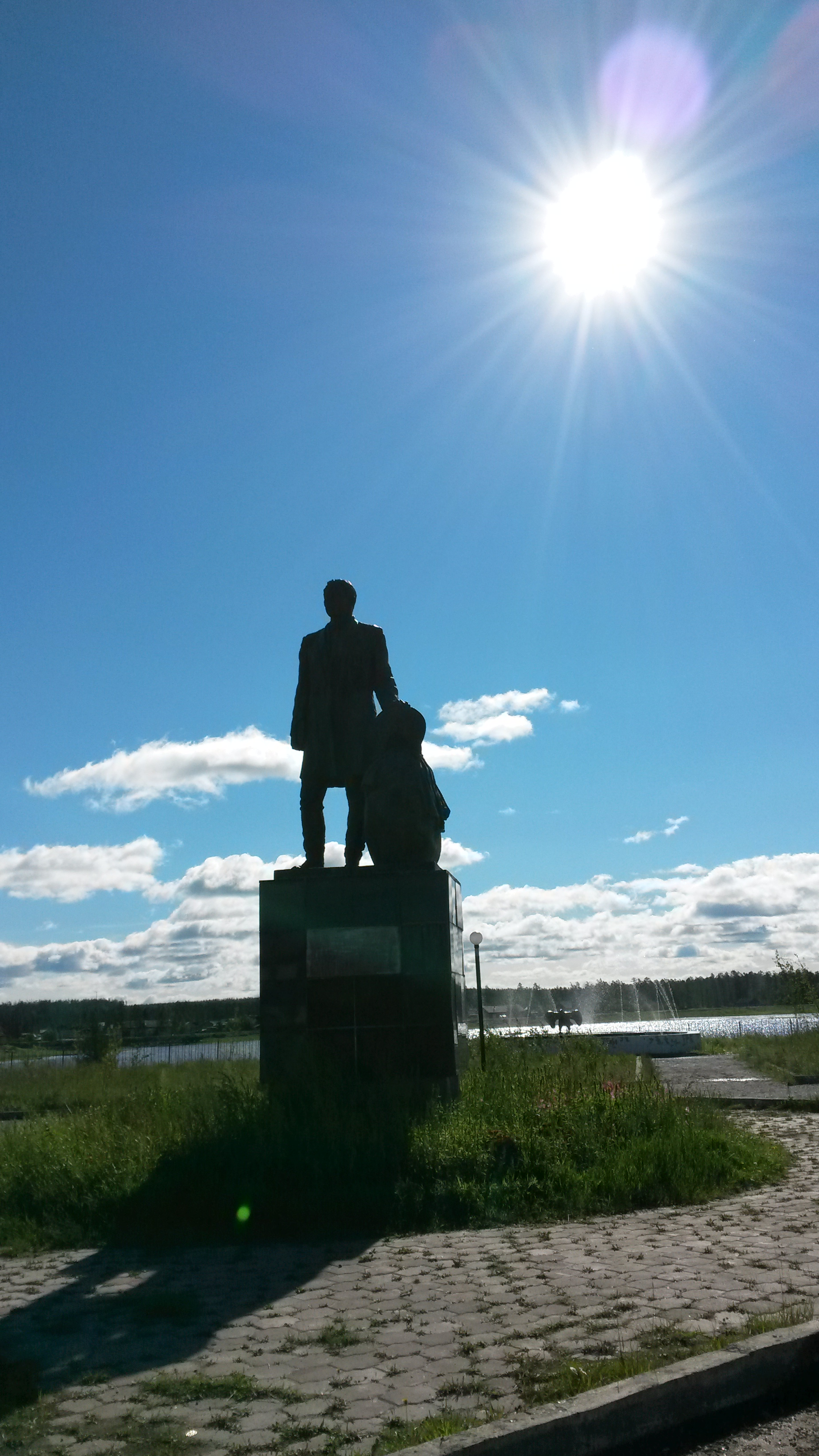
Monument

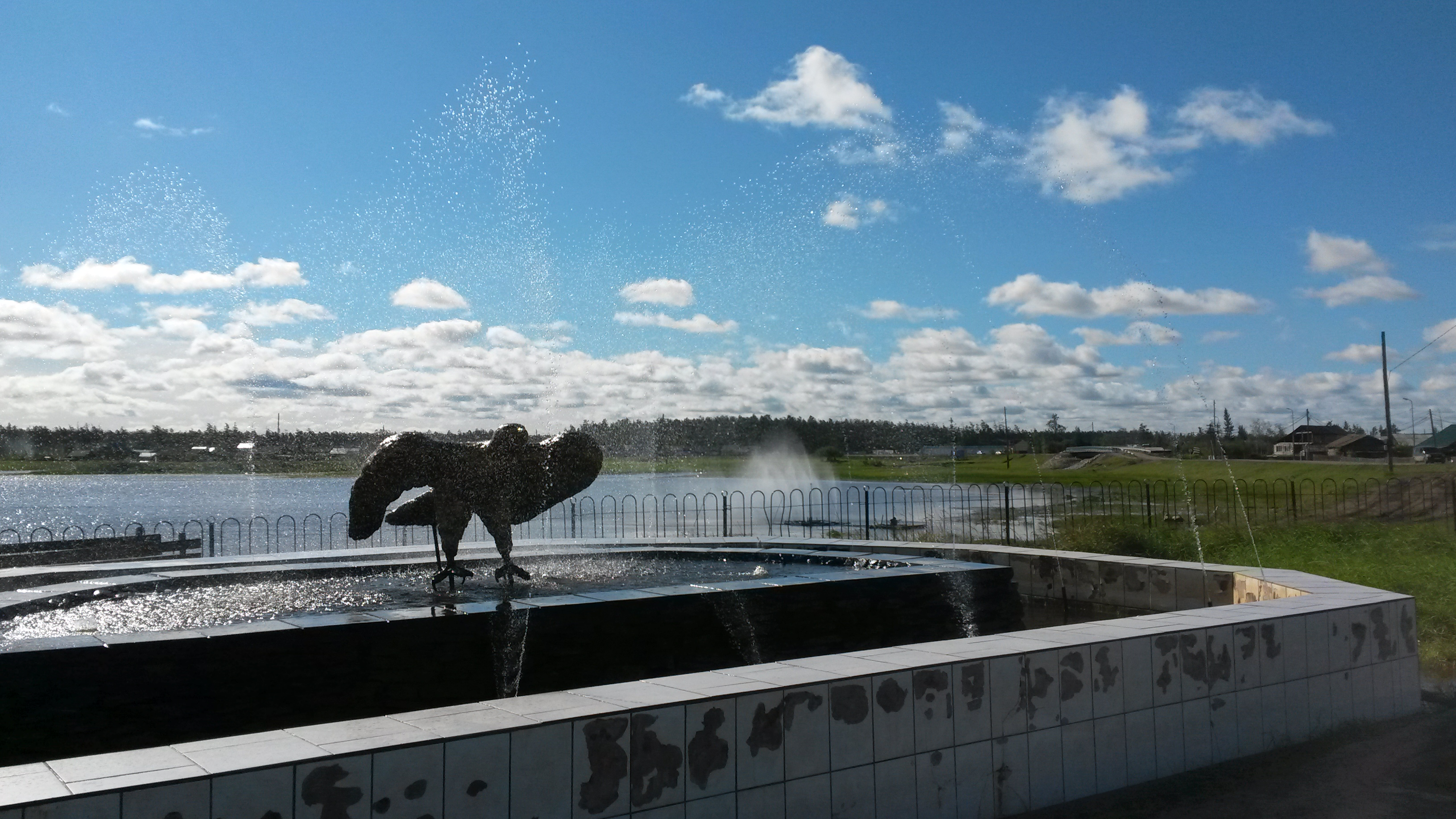
Monument

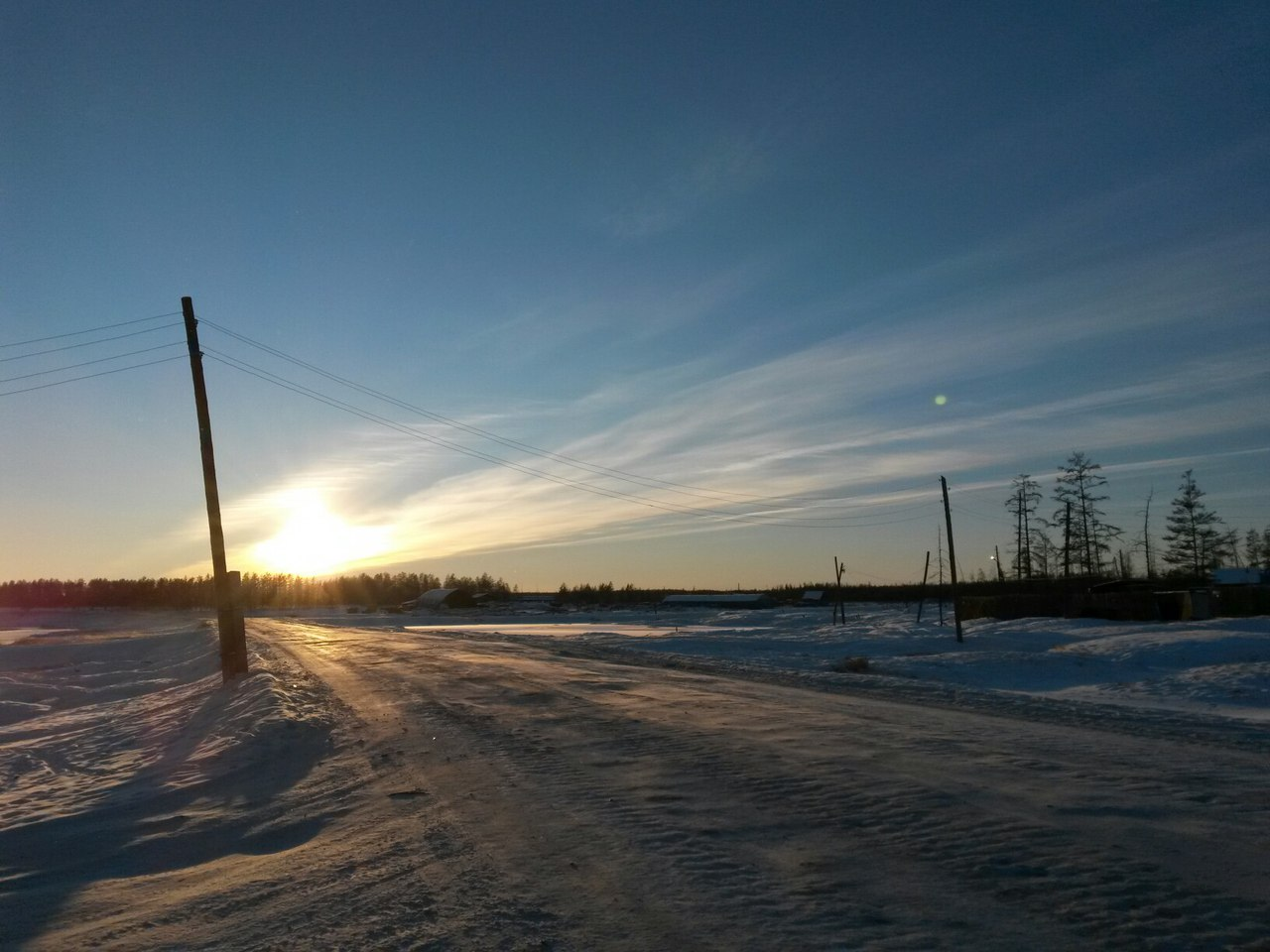
Landscape
