= Churapcha =

Churapcha Чурапча́

Other transcription(s)
  - Sakha: Чурапчы
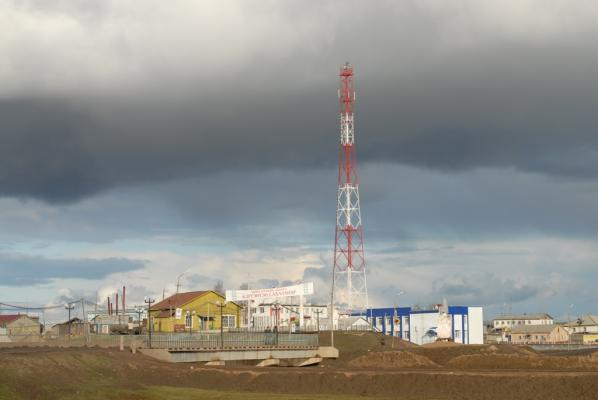

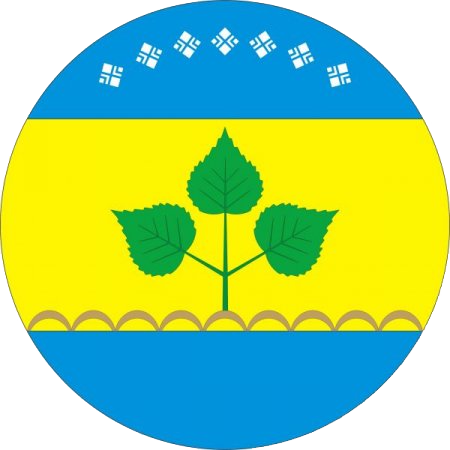
- Coat of arms
- Interactive map of Churapcha
- Location of Churapcha Churapcha (Sakha Republic)
- Coordinates: 61°59′34″N 132°25′54″E
- Country: Russia
- Federal subject: Sakha Republic
- Administrative district: Churapchinsky District
- Founded: 1725
- Elevation: 168 m (551 ft)

Population (2010 Census)
  - Total: 8,769
  - Estimate (2018): 10,177 (+16.1%)
- Time zone: UTC+
- Postal code: 678670
- OKTMO ID: 98658470101

Churapcha (Russian: Чурапча́; Yakut: Чурапчы, Çurapçı) is a rural locality (a selo) and the administrative center of Churapchinsky District in the Sakha Republic, Russia. Population: 8,769 (2010 census); 7,526 (2002 census); 6,232 (1989 Soviet census).

Historical population
Year	Pop.	±%
1939	1,657	—
1959	2,826	+70.5%
1970	4,557	+61.3%
1979	5,210	+14.3%
1989	6,232	+19.6%
2002	7,526	+20.8%
2010	8,769	+16.5%
2021	10,342	+17.9%
Source: Census data

== Geography ==
Churapcha is located by the lake of the same name, which drains to the left of the Tatta River, a tributary of the Aldan flowing a few kilometers to the southeast. The town lies 178 kilometers (111 mi) east of the republic's capital of Yakutsk in the basin of the Aldan River, a tributary of the Lena.

== History ==
It was founded in 1725 after opening the road (trakt) from Yakutsk to Okhotsk, which was supposed to allow post and trade to reach the Sea of Okhotsk. The road passed through very rough and isolated terrain and was never fully operational, eventually being officially closed in 1852. In 1930, Churapcha became the administrative center of Churapchinsky District and soon thereafter was connected by road to the outside world through the construction of the Kolyma Highway.

== Transportation ==
The Kolyma Highway from Yakutsk to Magadan runs through Churapcha.

== Climate ==
Churapcha has an extremely continental subarctic climate (Köppen: Dfd), with average winter temperatures even colder than nearby, more northerly Yakutsk. The summers are very warm and on average among the warmest for Dfd/Dwd climates. Churapcha is one of the very few places on earth where difference between average summer and winter temperature exceeds 60 °C or 108 °F.

Precipitation is significantly lower in the winter.

Climate data for Churapcha
Month	Jan	Feb	Mar	Apr	May	Jun	Jul	Aug	Sep	Oct	Nov	Dec	Year
Record high °C (°F)	−12.0 (10.4)	−4.5 (23.9)	7.0 (44.6)	16.5 (61.7)	30.0 (86.0)	36.7 (98.1)	37.8 (100.0)	35.0 (95.0)	27.1 (80.8)	18.9 (66.0)	9.3 (48.7)	−7.8 (18.0)	37.8 (100.0)
Mean daily maximum °C (°F)	−38.5 (−37.3)	−30.1 (−22.2)	−13.1 (8.4)	0.5 (32.9)	12.5 (54.5)	21.8 (71.2)	24.7 (76.5)	21.1 (70.0)	11.1 (52.0)	−5.2 (22.6)	−25.9 (−14.6)	−37.4 (−35.3)	−5.1 (22.8)
Daily mean °C (°F)	−42.2 (−44.0)	−36.9 (−34.4)	−22.6 (−8.7)	−6.6 (20.1)	6.8 (44.2)	15.6 (60.1)	18.4 (65.1)	14.6 (58.3)	5.2 (41.4)	−10.1 (13.8)	−30.5 (−22.9)	−40.8 (−41.4)	−11.0 (12.2)
Mean daily minimum °C (°F)	−46.8 (−52.2)	−44.1 (−47.4)	−33.2 (−27.8)	−16.0 (3.2)	−0.8 (30.6)	7.1 (44.8)	10.5 (50.9)	6.9 (44.4)	−1.3 (29.7)	−16.2 (2.8)	−36.3 (−33.3)	−45.3 (−49.5)	−18.2 (−0.8)
Record low °C (°F)	−62.2 (−80.0)	−61.1 (−78.0)	−52.8 (−63.0)	−42.8 (−45.0)	−16.1 (3.0)	−5.8 (21.6)	−3.0 (26.6)	−7.5 (18.5)	−18.9 (−2.0)	−42.2 (−44.0)	−57.2 (−71.0)	−60.0 (−76.0)	−62.2 (−80.0)
Average precipitation mm (inches)	7.2 (0.28)	6.1 (0.24)	10.4 (0.41)	18.8 (0.74)	26.8 (1.06)	41.3 (1.63)	43.2 (1.70)	39.3 (1.55)	39.0 (1.54)	42.0 (1.65)	26.2 (1.03)	8.8 (0.35)	309.1 (12.17)
