= Khomustakh =

Khomustakh (Russian: Хомустах) is the name of several rural localities in the Sakha Republic, Russia:

- Khomustakh, Megino-Kangalassky District, Sakha Republic, a selo in Neryuktyayinsky Rural Okrug of Megino-Kangalassky District
- Khomustakh, Batagaysky Rural Okrug, Ust-Aldansky District, Sakha Republic, a selo in Batagaysky Rural Okrug of Ust-Aldansky District
- Khomustakh, Legyoysky Rural Okrug, Ust-Aldansky District, Sakha Republic, a selo in Legyoysky Rural Okrug of Ust-Aldansky District
- Khomustakh, Khomustakhsky Rural Okrug, Verkhnevilyuysky District, Sakha Republic, a selo in Khomustakhsky Rural Okrug of Verkhnevilyuysky District
- Khomustakh, Namsky Rural Okrug, Verkhnevilyuysky District, Sakha Republic, a selo in Namsky Rural Okrug of Verkhnevilyuysky District
