= Daly, Russia =

Daly Далы
- Selo
- Interactive map of Daly
- Location of Daly Daly (Sakha Republic)
- Coordinates: 62°44′N 130°31′E
- Country: Russia
- Federal subject: Sakha Republic
- Administrative district: Ust-Aldansky District
- Rural okrugSelsoviet: Legyoysky Rural Okrug

Population
  - Estimate (2002): 69 )

Municipal status
  - Municipal district: Ust-Aldansky Municipal District
  - Rural settlement: Legyoysky Rural Settlement
- Time zone: UTC+
- Postal code: 678360
- OKTMO ID: 98652440106

Daly (Russian: Далы; Yakut: Даалы, Daalı) is a rural locality (a selo) in Legyoysky Rural Okrug of Ust-Aldansky District in the Sakha Republic, Russia, located 46 kilometers (29 mi) from Borogontsy, the administrative center of the district and 10 kilometers (6.2 mi) from Kepteni, the administrative center of the rural okrug. Its population as of the 2002 Census was 69.
