= Charanga =

Charanga may refer to:

- Charanga (Cuba), ballroom music ensemble
- Charanga (Spain), wind and percussion band playing in festivities

== See also ==
- Charang, several places in Russia
- Charango, a small Andean stringed instrument of the lute family
