= Balyktakh =

Balyktakh (Russian: Балыктах) is the name of several rural localities in the Sakha Republic, Russia:

- Balyktakh, Ust-Aldansky District, Sakha Republic, a selo in Nayakhinsky Rural Okrug of Ust-Aldansky District
- Balyktakh, Megino-Kangalassky District, Sakha Republic, a selo in Meginsky Rural Okrug of Megino-Kangalassky District
