= Ary-Tit =

Ary-Tit Ары-Тит
- Selo
- Interactive map of Ary-Tit
- Location of Ary-Tit Ary-Tit (Sakha Republic)
- Coordinates: 62°31′N 130°03′E
- Country: Russia
- Federal subject: Sakha Republic
- Administrative district: Ust-Aldansky District
- Rural okrugSelsoviet: Borogonsky Rural Okrug

Population
  - Estimate (2021): 125 )

Municipal status
  - Municipal district: Ust-Aldansky Municipal District
  - Rural settlement: Borogonsky Rural Settlement
- Time zone: UTC+
- Postal code: 678365
- OKTMO ID: 98652415106

Ary-Tit (Russian: Ары-Тит; Yakut: Арыы Тиит, Arıı Tiit) is a rural locality (a selo) in Borogonsky Rural Okrug of Ust-Aldansky District in the Sakha Republic, Russia, located 82 kilometers (51 mi) from Borogontsy, the administrative center of the district and 20 kilometers (12 mi) from Tumul, the administrative center of the rural okrug. Its population as of the 2002 Census was 181.
