= Lo-Ghekar Damodarkunda Rural Municipality =

Lo-Ghekar Damodarkunda लो-घेकर दामोदरकुण्ड गाउँपालिका
- Rural municipality
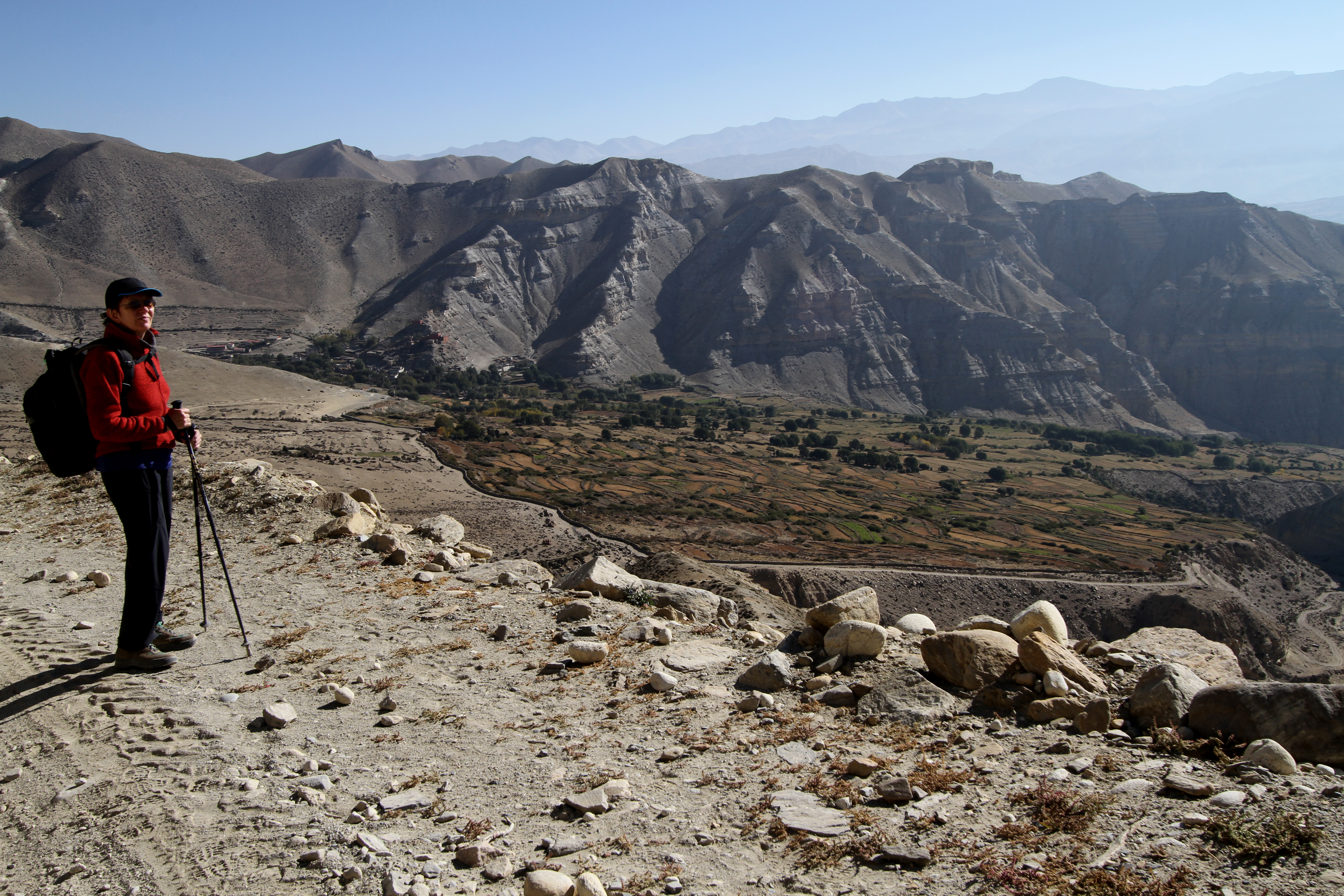
- View from Syangboche La

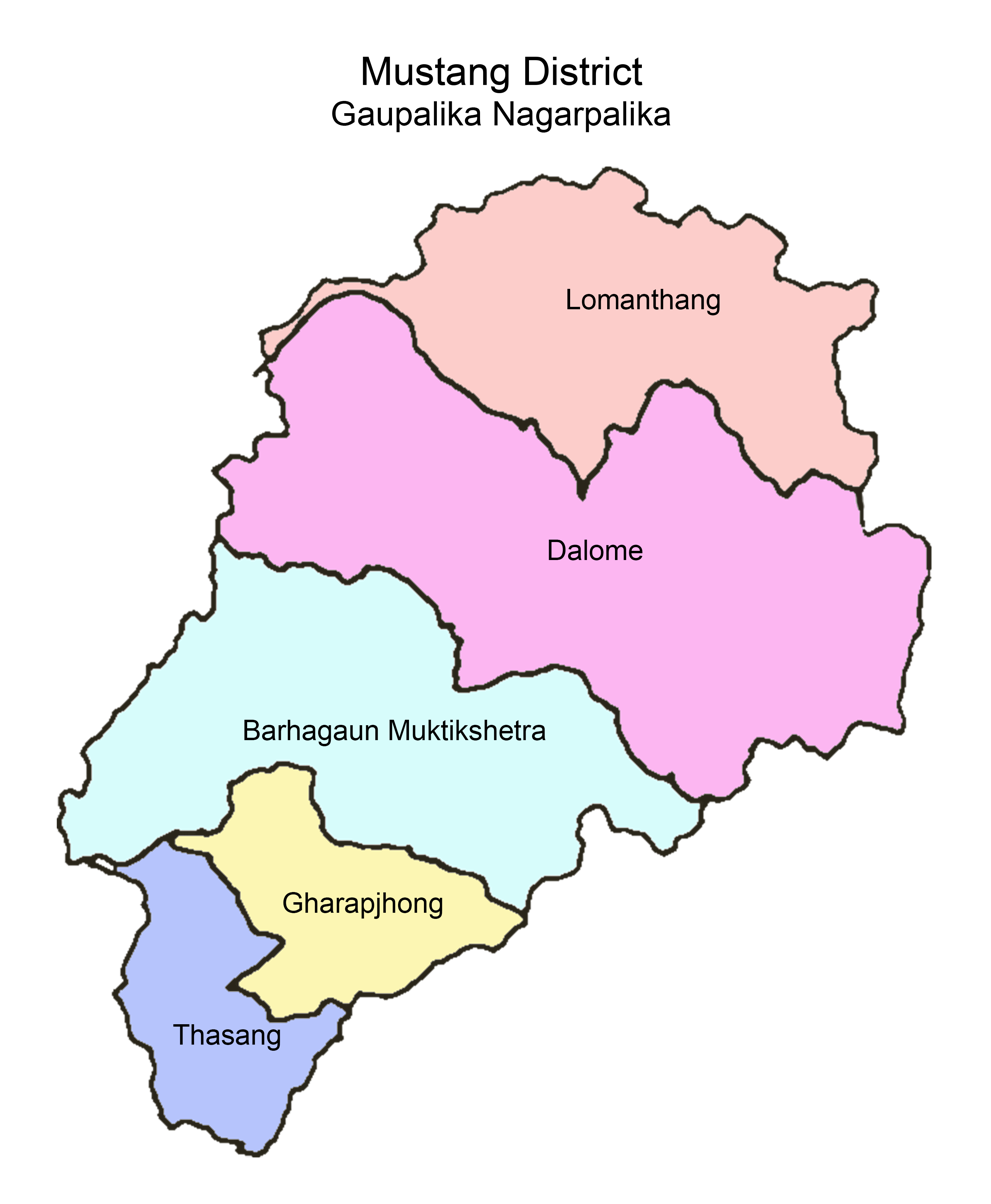

- Location in province Lo-Ghekar Damodarkunda (Nepal)
- Coordinates: 29°5′34″N 83°55′57″E
- Country: Nepal
- Province: Gandaki Province
- District: Mustang
- Established: 10 March 2017

Government
  - Type: Rural council
  - Body: Dalome Rural Council
  - Chairperson: Raju Bist (Ind)
  - Deputy-Chairperson: Dhoka Gurung (NCP)

Area
  - Total: 1,344 km^{2} (519 sq mi)
  - Rank: 7th (Nepal)

Population (2011)
  - Total: 1,423
  - Density: 1.059/km^{2} (2.742/sq mi)
- Time zone: UTC+5:45 (Nepal Time)
- Headquarters: Charang
- Website: loghekardamodarkundamun.gov.np

Lo-Ghekar Damodarkunda (Nepali: लोकेघर दामोदरकुण्ड) (earlier:Dalome) is a rural municipality situated in Mustang District of Gandaki Province of Nepal. The municipality is situated on the northern part of the Mustang, surrounded by Lomanthang rural municipality on the north, Barhagaun Muktichhetra on the south, Manang District on the south-east and Dolpa District on the west, while the north-eastern border of the rural municipality touches the border of Tibet in southwest China.

The total area of the rural municipality is 1,344 square kilometres (519 mi^{2}) and its population, according to the 2011 Nepal census, was 1423. The rural municipality is divided into 5 wards. The admin center of the rural municipality is at Charang.

Charang, Surkhang and Dhami Village development committees were Incorporated while established this rural municipality. The rural municipality came into existence on 10 March 2017, fulfilling the requirement of the new Constitution of Nepal 2015, Ministry of Federal Affairs and General Administration replaced all old VDCs and Municipalities into 753 new local level bodies.

== Demographics ==
At the time of the 2011 Nepal census, Lo-Ghekar Damodarkunda Rural Municipality had a population of 1,569. Of these, 69.1% spoke Lhopa, 23.1% Gurung, 3.5% Nepali, 1.6% Rai and 2.6% other languages as their first language.

In terms of ethnicity/caste, 40.1% were Lhopa, 30.8% Chhetri, 23.3% Gurung, 1.2% Hill Brahmin, 0.8% Chhantyal, 0.8% Kulung, 0.8% Rai and 2.2% others.

In terms of religion, 65.4% were Buddhist, 33.3% Hindu, 0.8% Kirati, 0.1% Bon, 0.1% Prakriti and 0.4% others.

In terms of literacy, 44.6% could read and write, 2.7% could only read and 52.7% could neither read nor write.

Dalome

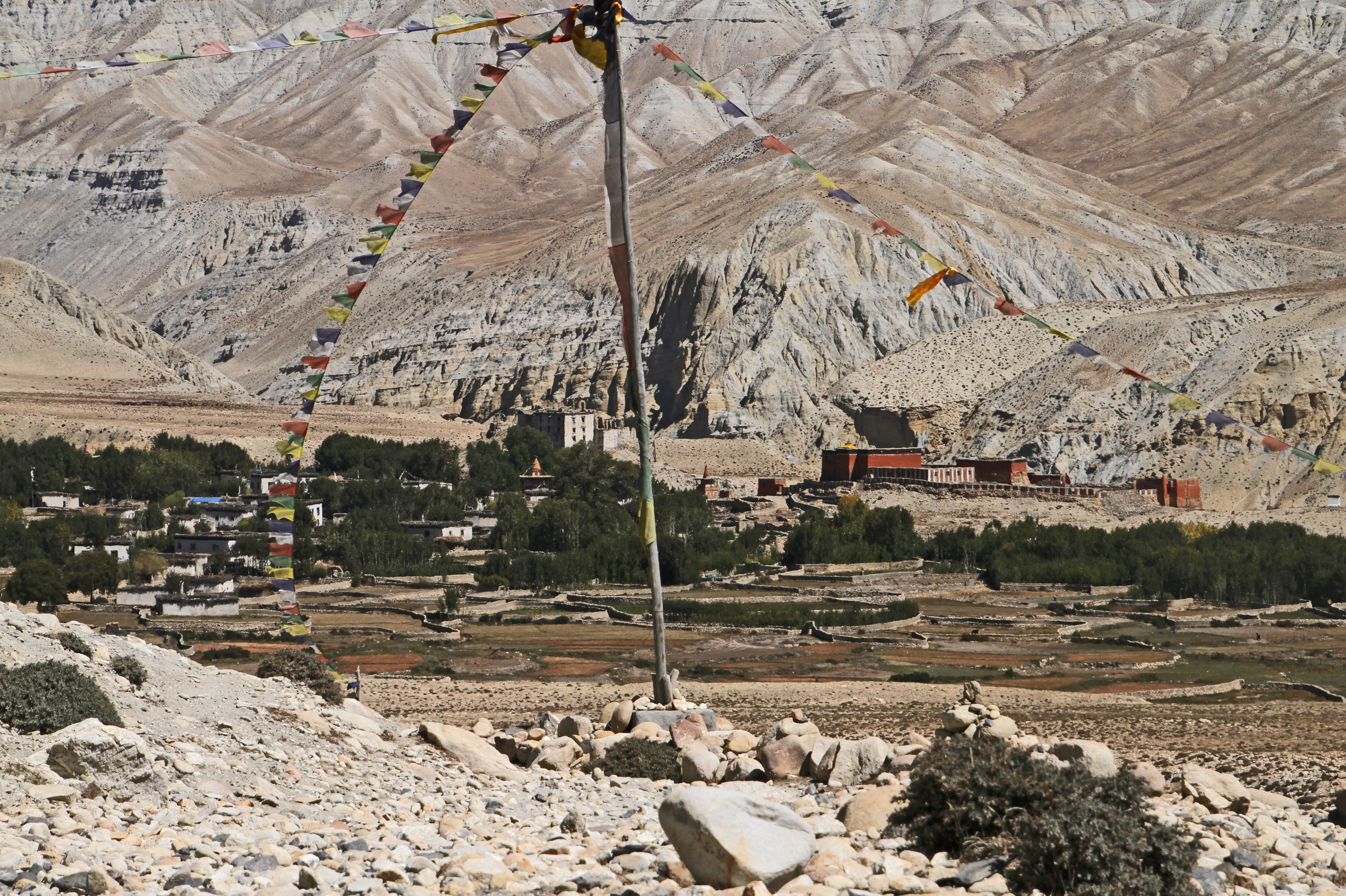
Charang

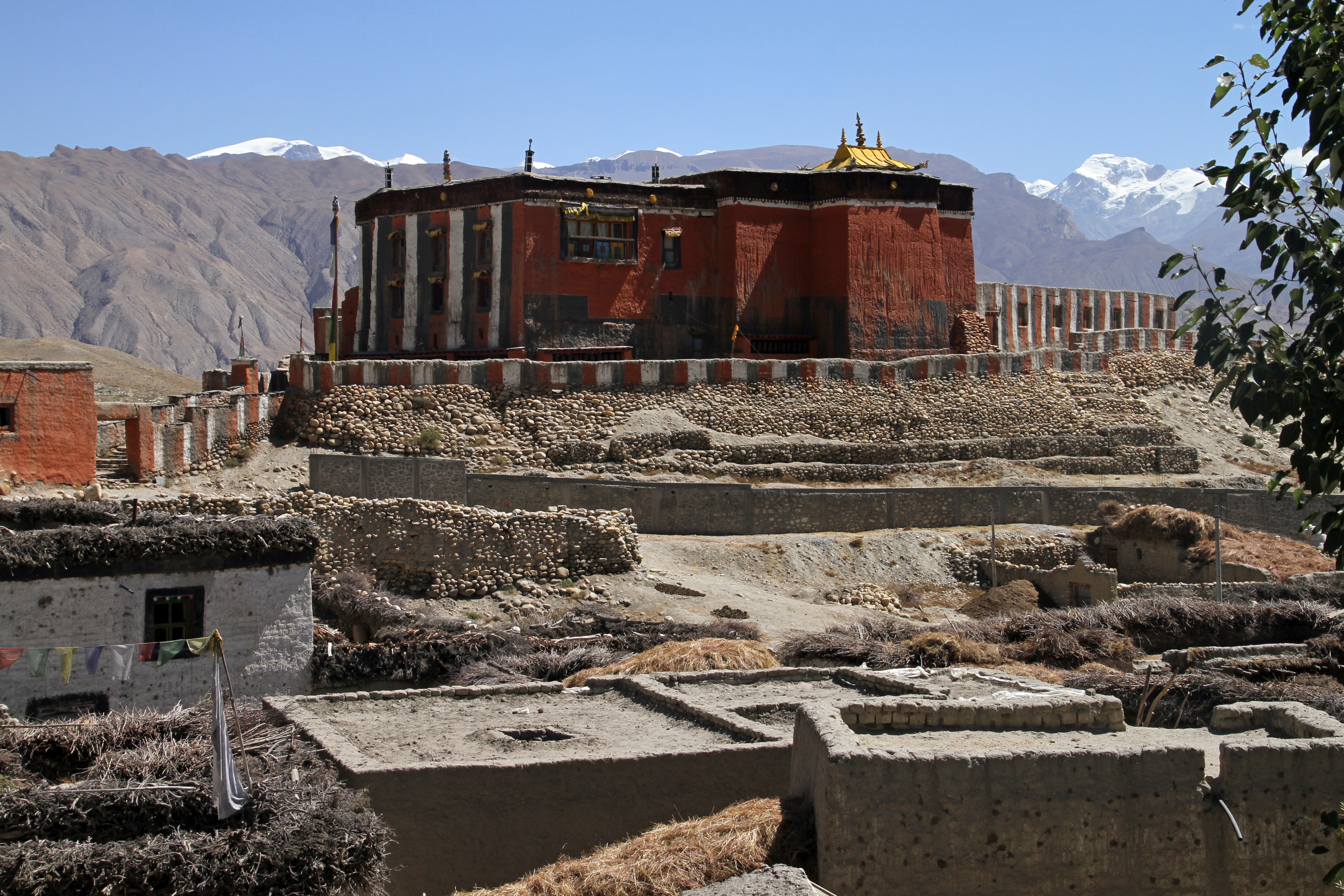
Charang Gompa

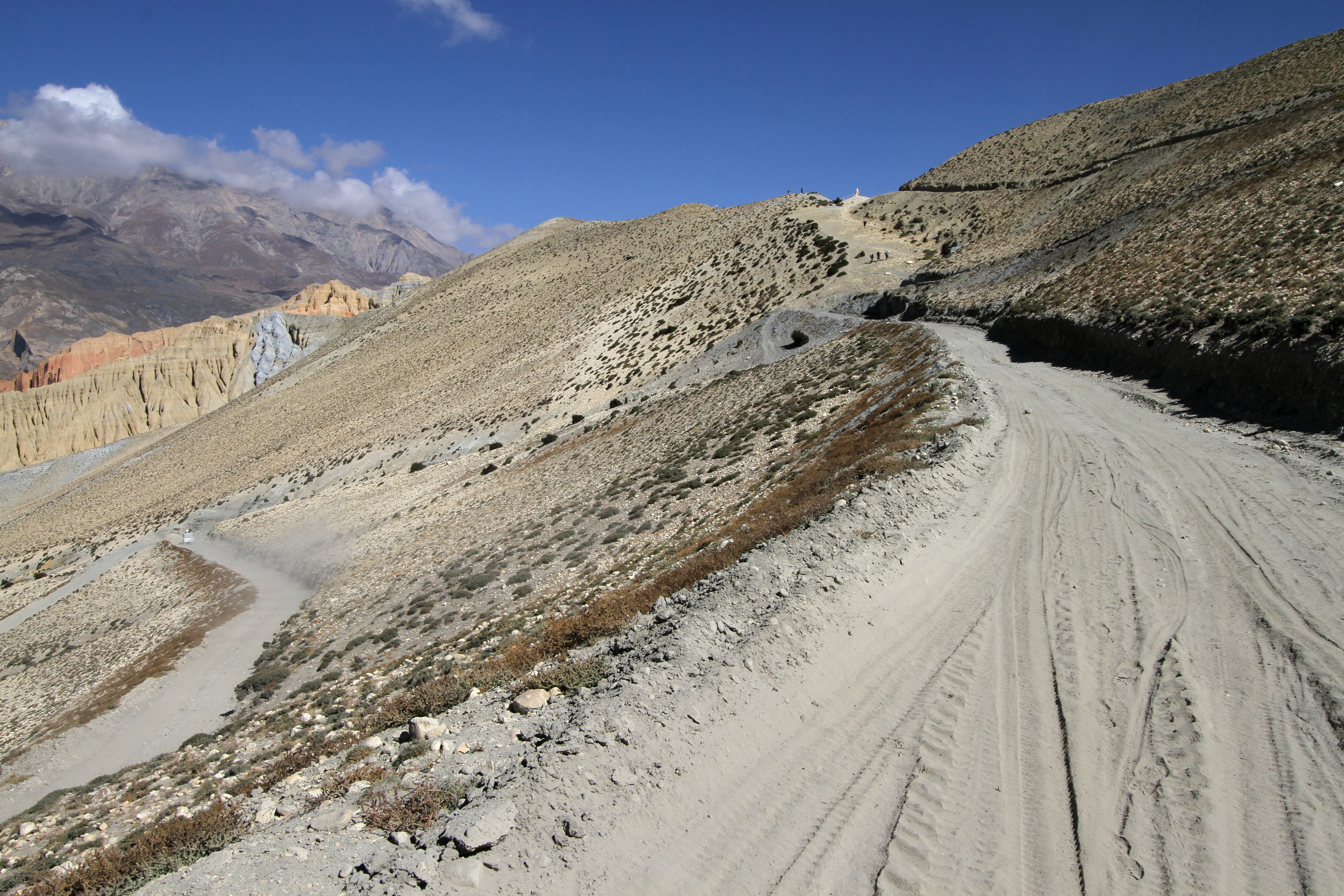
Road Tsarang - Ghami

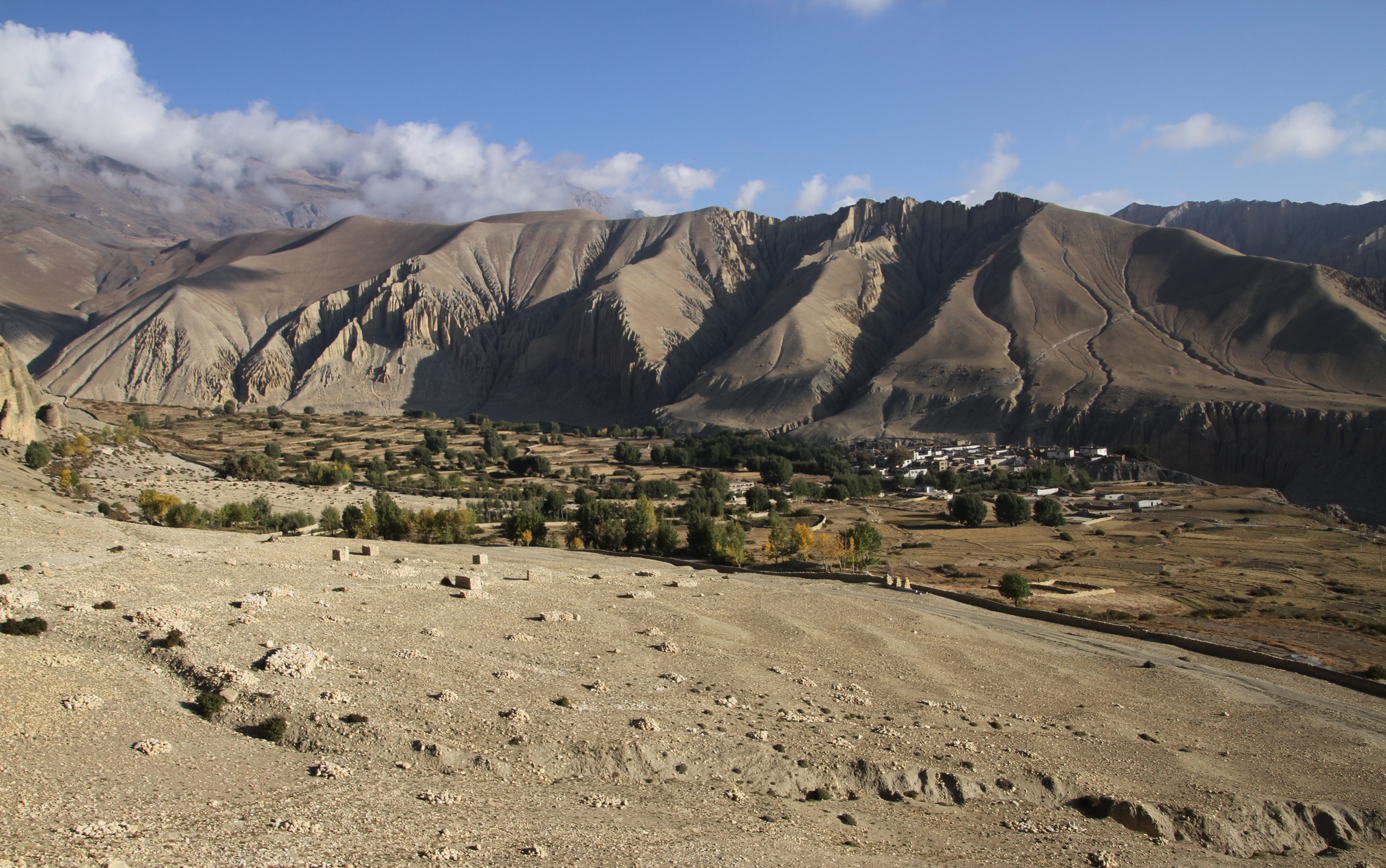
Ghami

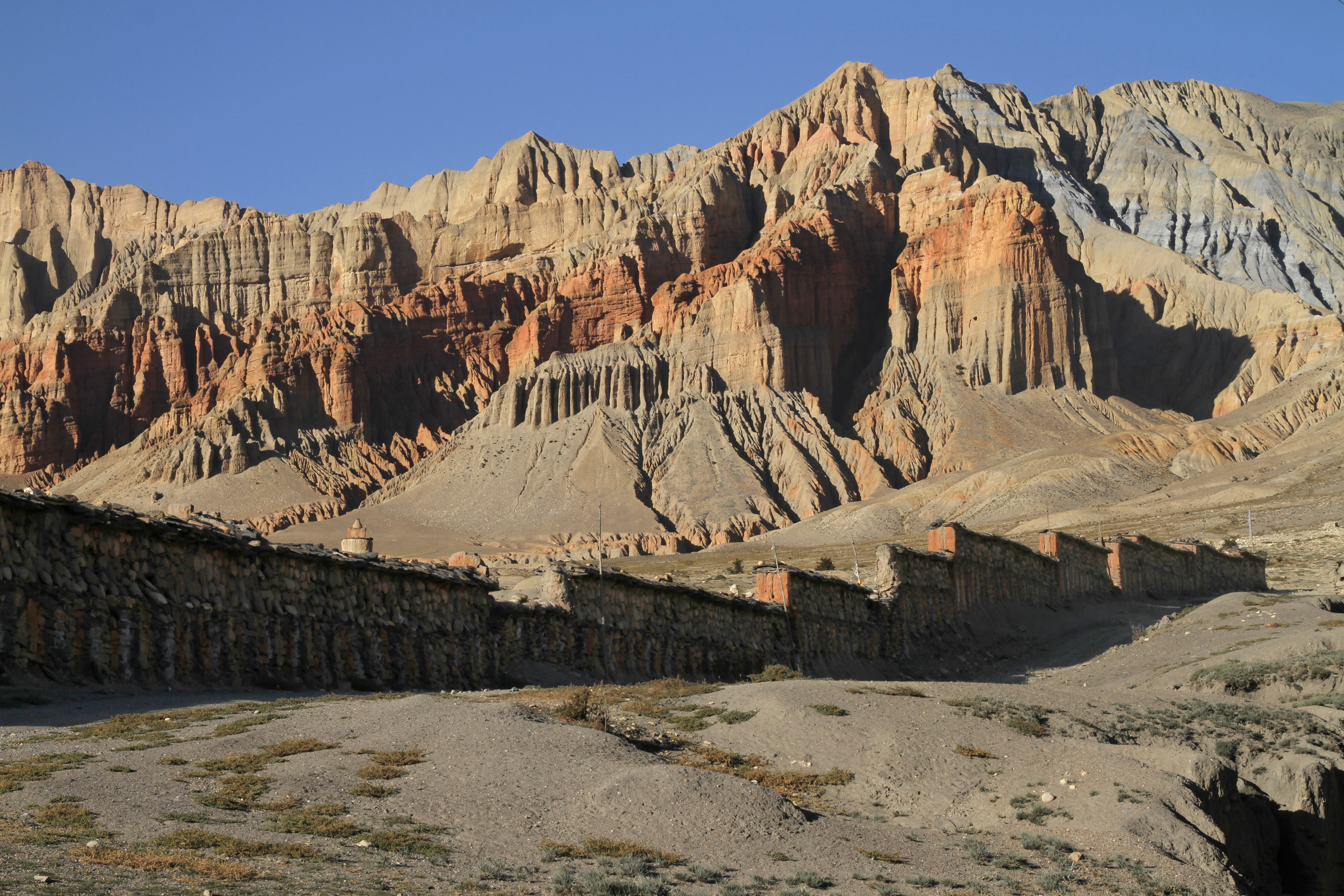
Ghami wall

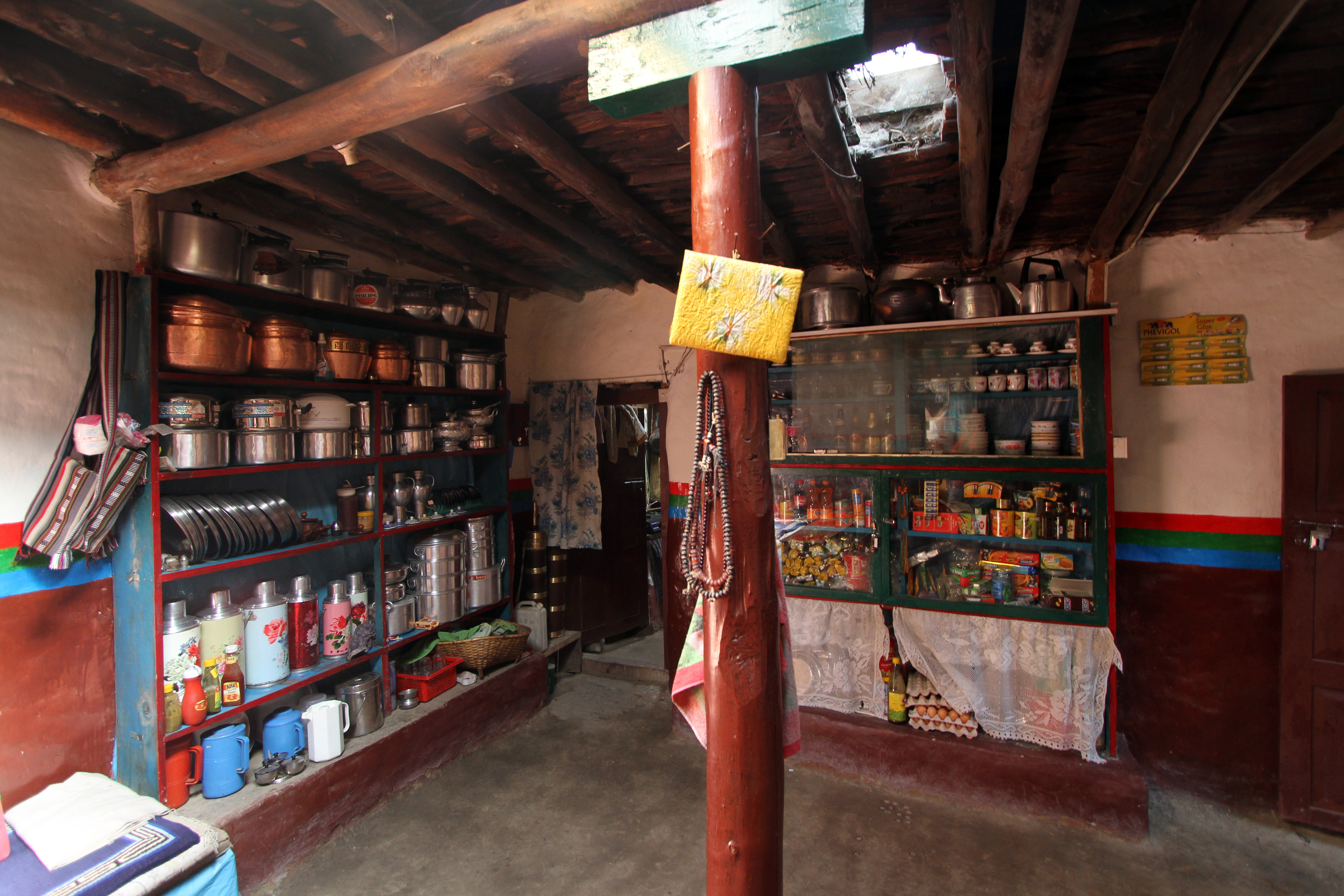
Hotel in Zhaite

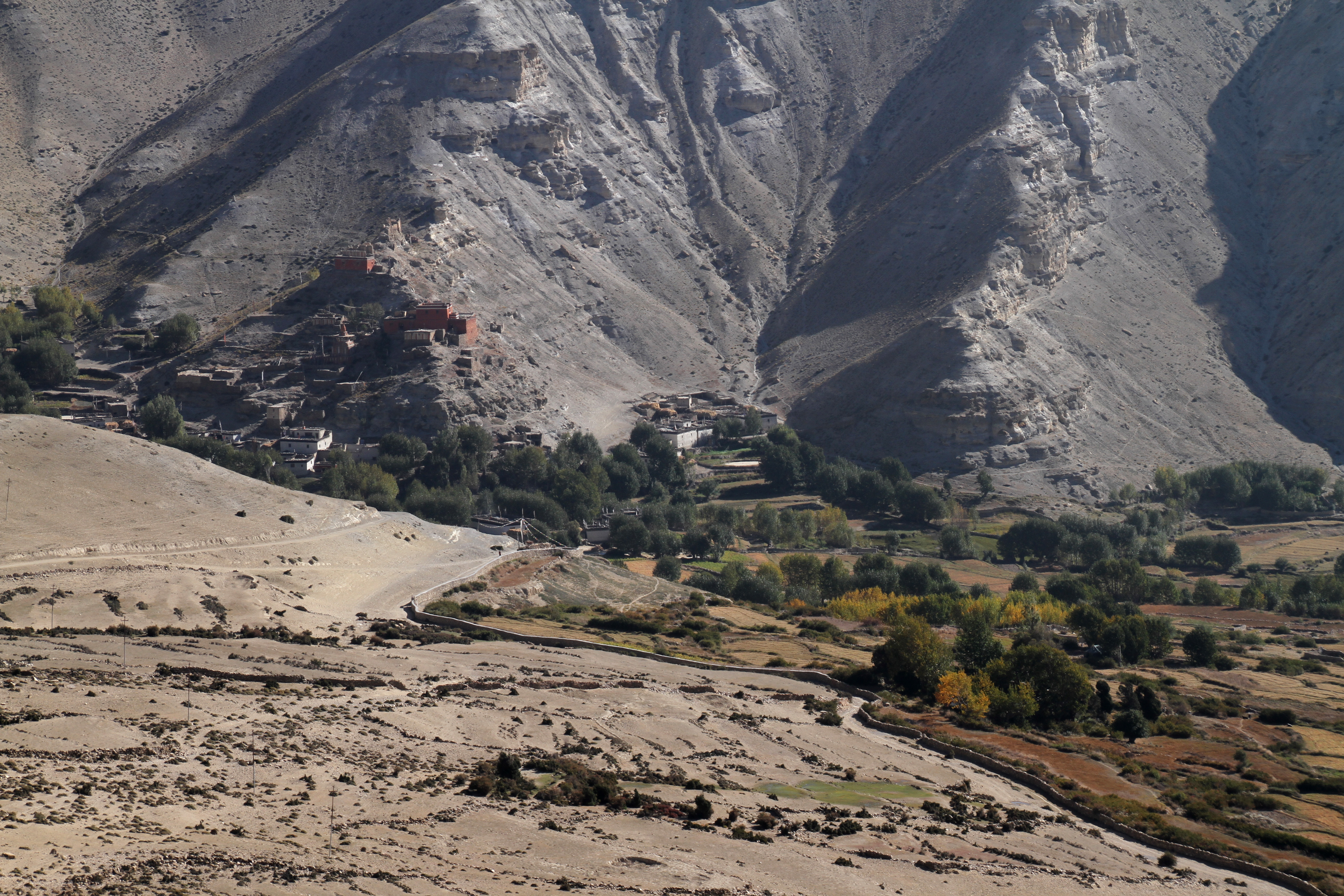
Ghiling gompa

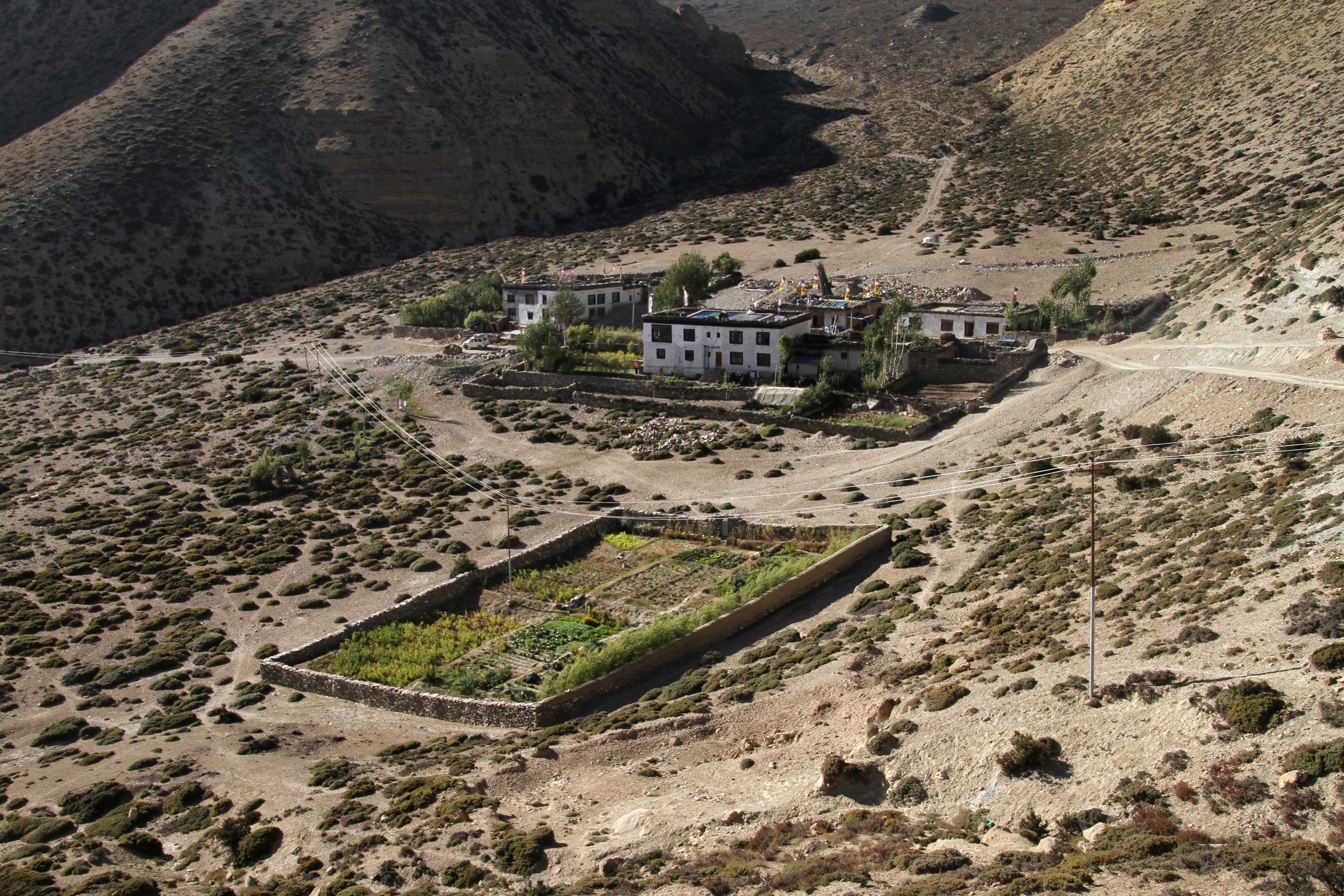
Syangboche
