= Carnival of La Bañeza =

Coordinates: 42°18′12″N 5°54′11″W

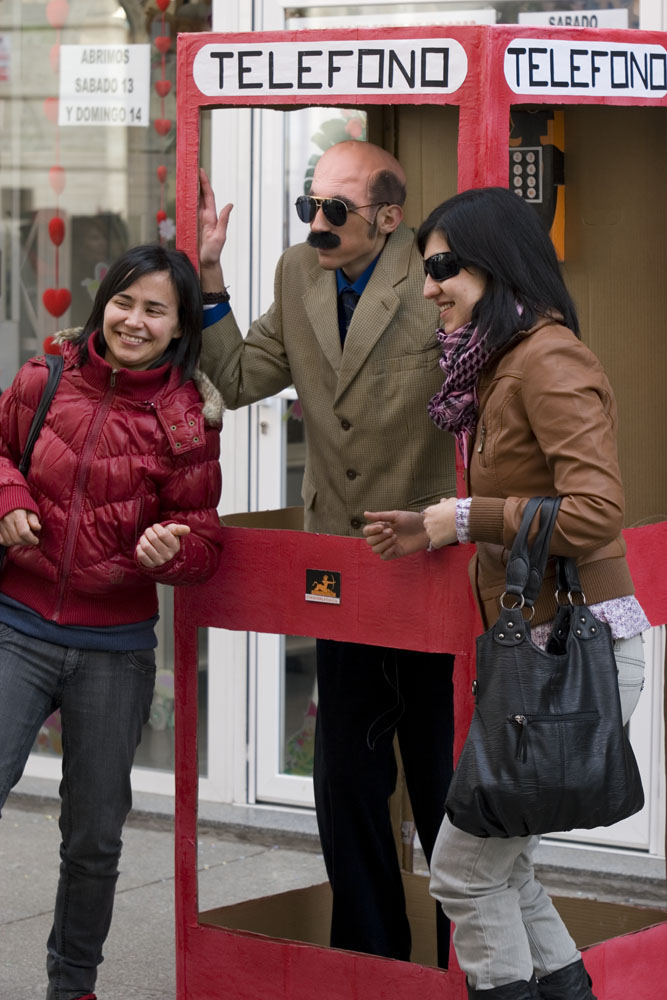
Carnival participants perform small comic acts.

The Carnival of La Bañeza (also called winter festivals, carnivals, the run of carnival, antruejo), in the province of Leon, is a festival declared of national tourist interest that began to gain importance and fame at the beginning of the 20th century during the repression under Franco, due to the prohibition of concealing one's face or wearing a costume. The main characteristic of La Bañeza's carnival is the absence of a costume competition with prizes and monetary compensation for participating, which may occur in carnivals elsewhere. Most of the city dedicates themselves wholeheartedly to the festival, passing on interest through generations. In many cases, participants prepare a year in advance, searching for accessories, fabrics, masks and acts they will perform, motivated by a "carnival feeling", lived during those days. Given this, the disorganized carnival is becoming increasingly popular, dressing up outside of parade hours, or on days without events, in the workplace, etc. looking to surprise and amaze the citizens and visitors.

== Preliminary events ==
The preparation of the celebration begins with the choice of the poster to represent carnival, through a competition organized by the city of La Bañeza. In the month of November, meetings are held with the groups participating in the parades to reach an agreement on the time, number of groups, and music or travel aspects.

Although not an officially organized event, it is of vital importance throughout the year; group meetings, gatherings of friends and family, where the participants discuss ideas and design costumes, looking for originality, often staying in strict secrecy to cause the largest possible impression. As winter comes, many participants begin to make their carnival costumes, although another percentage improvise and make their costumes with less time to spare, often coming out equally graceful.

Since 2006, the group Los Tranquilos have organized a monologue contest, in which participants have to dress up. From Christmas until the arrival of the carnival, the contest takes place once a week in different collaborating establishments, with the final on Piranha Saturday. Over time, the number of visitors and the level of the participants has been increasing, becoming a meeting place for different carnival participants. Totally unexpectedly, in 2008, a carnival karaoke contest also sprung up at a theater cafe in the city. In this contest, the participating groups prepare a song with choreography and costumes, delighting the audience.

== The program of Carnival ==
=== Declaration of the Muse ===
Carnival in La Bañeza usually begins on Thursday, the day the Salsa group declares the muse of carnival, a figure represented by a young girl of the city, chosen by the members of the group. In this act, in addition to the declaration, there is a preacher figure, theater shows, musicians and comedians. The Salsa group is one of the oldest groups participating in the parades.

=== Tranquilo Friday (Calm Friday) ===
The group Los +Turba2 begin the procession of San Turbadín at mid afternoon on Friday; with the naming of the "hermano +turbado", a title given to an outstanding carnival participant; upon continuation, they leave the main square following a particular route through various bars of the city, the followers continue the procession, dressed in religious costumes, to the sound of a charanga band. Notably backing up the procession is the processional float of San Turbadín, carried by the "hermanos turbados". "Tranquilo Friday" gets its name from the celebration organized by the group Los Tranquilos where at the end of their annual dinner, they honor one or various carnival participants. After, there is a party attended by a multitude of costumed people. There, they declare their decision for the best group of the previous carnival, the most original group and a special appointment.

=== Saturday of Chispas (sparks) ===
Saturday, La Bañeza converts into a great improvisational theater filled with people in costumes that do not stop interacting with the visitors. Traditionally, Saturday de Chispas, was called this due to the character El Chisposo, a cat who from the balcony of the townhall, would sing the popular song "Estaba el Señor don Gato". The attendees would dress wearing original hats that they made themselves, decorated in allegorical representations or original touches of color; while the main square was lit up by the flares carried by the dressed up people. Today, this representation has given way to a crowd of people dressed in costumes from all parts of Spain. Even so, the name Saturday of Chispas still remains.

The day begins in a totally surprising and spontaneous way. In the early morning hours, coinciding with the market of La Bañeza, many carnival participants perform small comic and theatrical acts evoking great interest among the visitors. This day is of increasing importance and is one of the greatest impulses by the young as it goes back to the roots of an institutionally disorganized carnival. Late in the afternoon, the proclamation giving the official start to carnival takes place (normally accompanied by musical acts, theatrical groups and comedians of the city). Then, many people dressed in costumes, attend the dinner of the exaltation of carnival, organized by the city council. Upon finishing dinner, the celebration begins with the sound of the brass bands of La Bañeza, allowing for the enjoyment of a night filled with jokes, pranks and humor by the disguised participants, in the center of the city.

=== Sunday of Carnival ===
Sunday morning, the Carnival Race is organized, being an allegory to the term the run of carnival. It consists of a gymkhana that goes from the old train station and to the main square. All the participants are dressed up, going in front of people dressed as security forces who try to make sure no one reaches the end of the course. Although primarily for younger children, there are people of all ages. At 5:00 pm, the parade of the previous year starts, where groups and individuals wear the same costume they wore the previous year, accompanied by floats and brass bands. Also making an appearance in the parade is the queen of carnival, accompanied by her maids of honor and the muse of carnival.

=== Monday of Carnival ===
In any business in La Bañeza, one can find the owners and employees dressed up for carnival. On Monday, like Saturday morning, crowds of people dressed in costumes re-emerge, cheering through the streets of the city. Another important feature is to see the people at work, dressed up to the surprise of visitors. At 5:00 pm, the children's parade begins, where children are the stars in a colorful parade with a shorter route.

=== Nochebruja ===
At night, starting at 12:00 am, Nochebruja begins. Created in 1985 by thousands of carnival enthusiasts coming from numerous geographical points of Spain. It's the busiest night of people in costumes that can go until the early hours of the morning, in the streets and bars of the city, making it a major festival in northern Spain.

=== Tuesday of Carnival ===
The Tuesday parade of carnival through the streets of La Bañeza. The Tuesday of Carnival, at 5:00 pm, the big parade starts off, led by the muse of carnival along with the Salsa group and ending with the queen of the festival and her maids of honor. This is the most important day of the celebration, as all attendees dress in the costumes they designed and made throughout the year in secret. At the end, all the participants are given a bun filled with chorizo. The number of visitors is very important, but has led to circulation problems in traffic on the access roads to La Bañeza. The number of groups exceeds fifty. This day, along with August 16 are chosen as local holidays in the city.

=== Ash Wednesday ===
La peña La Sardina organizes the Burial of the Sardine, a funeral procession made up of the group members, characterized by a suit, coat, hat and long beard, the carriers of the coffin, a white tunic, hat and slippers and the mourners, representing the widows of Don Carnal. All of them are accompanied by a brass band that mixes the rhythms of carnival with those of the funeral. It starts in the Bar Industrial and goes to the main square where after a reading by the character of El Corvillo of ballads of satire and irony about what happened in the city during the year, bread, pickles and wine are freely distributed, and it ends with the burning of a figurine in the shape of a sardine.

=== Saturday of the Piranha ===
In the Mojao Neighborhood, the final events of the masquerade are organized, with special prices for the area for those who come in costumes. The original name of this day was Saturday of the piñata, but to differentiate and maintain the burlesque tone, it was changed to "Piranha Saturday". Some establishments celebrate the dance of the piñata.

== Announcer ==
The person chosen as the announcer of carnival. They are usually related in some way to the city.

Year	Announcer
1979	Victoriano Crémer
1984	Maximino Brasa
1987	Isabel Baeza
2003	Alfredo Prada
2004	Antonio Nuñez
2005	Pedro García Trapiello
2006	Benigno Castro Martínez
2007	Florencio Carrera
2008	Polo Fuertes
2009	Georgie Dann
2010	Crispín d'Olot
2011	Pablo R. Lago
2012	Ignacio Fernández Sobrino
2013	Luis Larrodera
2014	Enrique Simón
2015	Beatriz Jarrín Lera
2016	Pepe Ruiz
2017	Ana Arias

== Acknowledgments ==
In 1990, recognized by the Crest of Tourism in the Silver category, and in 2002, earned the statement of Regional Tourist Interest by the Council of Castilla y León. In 2011, declared of national tourist interest by the Tourism Department. In 2008, thanks to a citizens’ initiative, signatures began being collected to support naming a city street carnival. More than 1,300 people of La Bañeza supported the cause with signatures and over 500 signatures were made over the Internet in a survey published on the website carnavaldelabaneza.com. La Bañeza already has the carnival's square, a green space that is missing only a symbolic sculpture to finish the project.

== Music ==
Component of a charanga of La Bañeza, in the parade. The musical tradition of carnival in La Bañeza is reflected in group ensembles called charangas (brass bands). The most important charangas of La Bañeza are Los 4 Gatos, Rico - Rico y Ritmo Joven, who are asked to join those from other cities in Spain to play in their parades. To these formations, the group La Charra that musically enlivens the streets and taverns of La Bañeza with humor, must be added. The summer sounds of artists such as Georgie Dann, or Rafaella Carrà, are adopted as carnival songs, so playing these songs during the days of festivities is synonymous with carnival music. In addition, many of the brass bands have a number of these songs in their repertoire.

== Carnival solidarity ==
In 2009, the "Day of exaltation of carnival" was organized in the prison of Mansilla de las Mulas, by private initiative. Carnival participants and members of groups of La Bañeza participated with inmates on a holiday, trying to bring carnival closer to the inmates and by doing so, make their time in the center pass more quickly. In 2010, the city council of La Bañeza and Red Cross of La Bañeza, launched a collection of funds to help the earthquake victims in Haiti.

== Studies about Carnival ==
In 2004, a summer course was organized by the University of Leon called Visions of Carnival, would be reflected in the publication of a book with the same name two years later, coordinated by José María Balcells.

In 2006, the First National Congress of Carnival in La Bañeza was held, organized by the city council of La Bañeza, the University of León and UNED, tackling songs, historical and other fields about the origin of the festival. Representatives were invited from other carnivals of Spain, such as Sitges, Cádiz, Ciudad Rodrigo and Los Realejos, participating in panel discussions on the theme of carnival. The musical participation was carried out by the folk group Tornadera from Leon, the troupe La Charra and joke Cadiz group Los Aguafiestas. In February 2010, the book containing the proceedings of the congress held in 2006 was presented, with the name Carnival: Tradition and Today.

== Carnival online ==
In 2006, the first website about carnival in La Bañeza was born, coming to light the day before the start of the festivities. Since then, it is updated with various information, videos, news, surveys, forums, history and other aspects of carnival. Initiatives are started through the page by different participants of carnival like the naming of Plaza del Carnaval, a tribute to Molina, the execution of an allegorical mural by graffiti artists of La Bañeza and the region or the idea to seek a declaration of Interest Party National Tourist. In 2010, the spread of carnival on the internet intensified in the field of social networks, creating a Facebook group, tuenti and Twitter, and celebrating "The Day of the Carnival of La Bañeza on the Internet".

== Gastronomy ==
In the varied confectionery goods in La Bañeza one can find different products typical of this holiday, such as the Ears of Carnival, Carnival Masks or Dominoes.
