= Us-Kyuyol =

Us-Kyuyol Ус-Кюёль
- Selo
- Interactive map of Us-Kyuyol
- Location of Us-Kyuyol Us-Kyuyol (Sakha Republic)
- Coordinates: 62°25′N 131°36′E
- Country: Russia
- Federal subject: Sakha Republic
- Administrative district: Ust-Aldansky District
- Rural okrugSelsoviet: Kurbusakhsky Rural Okrug

Population
  - Estimate (2002): 912 )

Administrative status
  - Capital of: Kurbusakhsky Rural Okrug

Municipal status
  - Municipal district: Ust-Aldansky Municipal District
  - Rural settlement: Kurbusakhsky Rural Settlement
  - Capital of: Kurbusakhsky Rural Settlement
- Time zone: UTC+
- Postal code: 678354
- OKTMO ID: 98652435101

Us-Kyuyol (Russian: Ус-Кюёль; Yakut: Уус Күөлэ, Uus Küöle) is a rural locality (a selo), the administrative centre of and one of three settlements, in addition to Balagannakh and Okoyemovka, in Kurbusakhsky Rural Okrug of Ust-Aldansky District in the Sakha Republic, Russia. It is located 73 kilometers (45 mi) from Borogontsy, the administrative center of the district. Its population as of the 2002 Census was 912.
