= Syrdakh, Ust-Aldansky District, Sakha Republic =

Syrdakh Сырдах
- Selo
- Interactive map of Syrdakh
- Location of Syrdakh Syrdakh (Sakha Republic)
- Coordinates: 62°32′N 130°55′E
- Country: Russia
- Federal subject: Sakha Republic
- Administrative district: Ust-Aldansky District
- Rural okrugSelsoviet: Bert-Usovsky Rural Okrug

Population
  - Estimate (2002): 860 )

Administrative status
  - Capital of: Bert-Usovsky Rural Okrug

Municipal status
  - Municipal district: Ust-Aldansky Municipal District
  - Rural settlement: Bert-Usovsky Rural Settlement
  - Capital of: Bert-Usovsky Rural Settlement
- Time zone: UTC+
- Postal code: 678372
- OKTMO ID: 98652420101

Syrdakh (Russian: Сырдах; Yakut: Сыырдаах, Sıırdaax) is a rural locality (a selo), the administrative centre of and one of two settlements, in addition to Chiryapchi, in Bert-Usovsky Rural Okrug of Ust-Aldansky District in the Sakha Republic, Russia. It is located 28 kilometers (17 mi) from Borogontsy, the administrative center of the district. Its population as of the 2002 Census was 860.
