= La Bañeza =

- Municipality
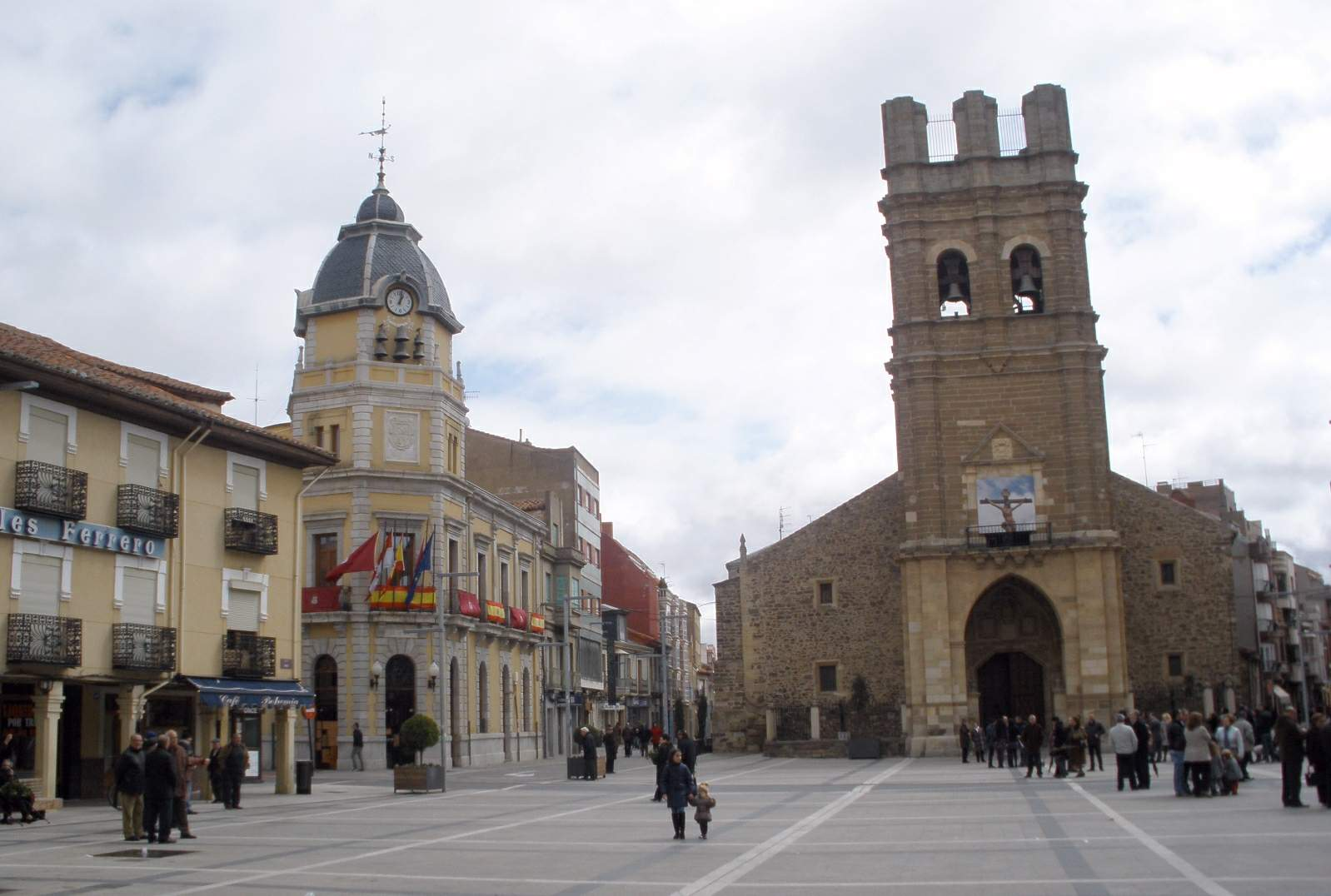

- Flag Coat of arms

- Location in the Province of León Location in Castile and León Location in Spain
- Coordinates: 42°17′51″N 5°54′6″W
- Country: Spain
- Autonomous community: Castile and León
- Province: León
- Comarca: Tierra de La Bañeza

Government
  - Mayor: José Miguel Palazuelo Martín (PSOE)

Area
  - Total: 19.71 km^{2} (7.61 sq mi)
- Elevation: 772 m (2,533 ft)

Population (2025-01-01)
  - Total: 10,195
  - Density: 517.3/km^{2} (1,340/sq mi)
- Demonym(s): bañezano, bañezana
- Time zone: UTC+1 (CET)
  - Summer (DST): UTC+2 (CEST)
- Postal Code: 24750
- Telephone prefix: 987

La Bañeza (Spanish pronunciation: [la βaˈɲeθa]) is a municipality located in the province of León, Castile and León, Spain. According to the 2010 census (INE), the municipality had a population of 11,050 inhabitants.

It is the capital of the region of Tierra de La Bañeza.

Located in a region originally inhabited by the Astures population its territory was a part of Conventus Asturum during the Roman times. The city was founded in the 9th century by conde Gatón from two small villages San Pedro de Périx and Bani Eiza. La Bañeza hosted a marquis in the modern age and, in the end of the 19th century, was transformed by the arrival of the railroad in 1896. A year earlier, in 1895, Queen Regent Maria Christina of Austria gives the title of city.

Tourist attractions include the churches of San Salvador and Santa María, as well as several celebrations during the year, of which some of the more important are the Carnivals, Holy Week, and the motorbike race in August, the La Bañeza Grand Prix, one of the last urban motor-races in the world.

== See also ==
- Tierra de La Bañeza
- Carnival of La Bañeza
- Kingdom of León
- Leonese language
- La Bañeza Grand Prix
