= Byadi =

Byadi Бяди
- Selo
- Interactive map of Byadi
- Location of Byadi Byadi (Sakha Republic)
- Coordinates: 63°08′N 130°43′E
- Country: Russia
- Federal subject: Sakha Republic
- Administrative district: Ust-Aldansky District
- Rural okrugSelsoviet: Dyupsyunsky Rural Okrug

Population
  - Estimate (2002): 307 )

Municipal status
  - Municipal district: Ust-Aldansky Municipal District
  - Rural settlement: Dyupsyunsky Rural Settlement
- Time zone: UTC+
- Postal code: 678362
- OKTMO ID: 98652430106

Byadi (Russian: Бяди; Yakut: Бээди, Beedi) is a rural locality (a selo) in Dyupsyunsky Rural Okrug of Ust-Aldansky District in the Sakha Republic, Russia, located 66 kilometers (41 mi) from Borogontsy, the administrative center of the district and 10 kilometers (6.2 mi) from Dyupsya, the administrative center of the rural okrug. Its population as of the 2002 Census was 307.
