= Arylakh, Ust-Aldansky District, Sakha Republic =

Arylakh Арылах
- Selo
- Interactive map of Arylakh
- Location of Arylakh Arylakh (Sakha Republic)
- Coordinates: 64°24′N 130°43′E
- Country: Russia
- Federal subject: Sakha Republic
- Administrative district: Ust-Aldansky District
- Rural okrugSelsoviet: Oltyokhsky Rural Okrug

Population
  - Estimate (2021): 337 )

Municipal status
  - Municipal district: Ust-Aldansky Municipal District
  - Rural settlement: Oltyokhsky Rural Settlement
- Time zone: UTC+
- Postal code: 678373
- OKTMO ID: 98652455106

Arylakh (Russian: Арылах; Yakut: Арыылаах, Arıılaax) is a rural locality (a selo) in Oltyokhsky Rural Okrug of Ust-Aldansky District in the Sakha Republic, Russia, located 43 kilometers (27 mi) from Borogontsy, the administrative center of the district and 8 kilometers (5.0 mi) from Beydinga, the administrative center of the rural okrug. Its population as of the 2002 Census was 384.
