= Stoyka =

Stoyka Стойка
- Selo
- Interactive map of Stoyka
- Location of Stoyka Stoyka (Sakha Republic)
- Coordinates: 62°58′N 130°50′E
- Country: Russia
- Federal subject: Sakha Republic
- Administrative district: Ust-Aldansky District
- Rural okrugSelsoviet: Dyupsyunsky Rural Okrug

Population
  - Estimate (2002): 47 )

Municipal status
  - Municipal district: Ust-Aldansky Municipal District
  - Rural settlement: Dyupsyunsky Rural Settlement
- Time zone: UTC+
- Postal code: 678362
- OKTMO ID: 98652430111

Stoyka (Russian: Стойка; Yakut: Остуойка, Ostuoyka) is a rural locality (a selo) in Dyupsyunsky Rural Okrug of Ust-Aldansky District in the Sakha Republic, Russia, located 39 kilometers (24 mi) from Borogontsy, the administrative center of the district and 17 kilometers (11 mi) from Dyupsya, the administrative center of the rural okrug. Its population as of the 2002 Census was 47.
