= Byariye =

Byariye Бярийе
- Selo
- Interactive map of Byariye
- Location of Byariye Byariye (Sakha Republic)
- Coordinates: 62°53′N 131°54′E
- Country: Russia
- Federal subject: Sakha Republic
- Administrative district: Ust-Aldansky District
- Rural okrugSelsoviet: Byariyinsky Rural Okrug

Population (2010 Census)
  - Total: 297
  - Estimate (2021): 242 (−18.5%)

Administrative status
  - Capital of: Byariyinsky Rural Okrug

Municipal status
  - Municipal district: Ust-Aldansky Municipal District
  - Rural settlement: Byariyinsky Rural Settlement
  - Capital of: Byariyinsky Rural Settlement
- Time zone: UTC+
- Postal code: 678356
- OKTMO ID: 98652425101

Byariye (Russian: Бярийе; Yakut: Бээрийэ, Beeriye) is a rural locality (a selo), the only inhabited locality, and the administrative center of Byariyinsky Rural Okrug of Ust-Aldansky District in the Sakha Republic, Russia, located 77 kilometers (48 mi) from Borogontsy, the administrative center of the district. Its population as of the 2010 Census was 297, up from 293 recorded during the 2002 Census.
