= Sasylykan =

Sasylykan Сасылыкан
- Selo
- Interactive map of Sasylykan
- Location of Sasylykan Sasylykan (Sakha Republic)
- Coordinates: 62°29′N 130°40′E
- Country: Russia
- Federal subject: Sakha Republic
- Administrative district: Ust-Aldansky District
- Rural okrugSelsoviet: Suottunsky Rural Okrug

Population
  - Estimate (2002): 131 )

Municipal status
  - Municipal district: Ust-Aldansky Municipal District
  - Rural settlement: Suottunsky Rural Settlement
- Time zone: UTC+
- Postal code: 678371
- OKTMO ID: 98652470106

Sasylykan (Russian: Сасылыкан; Yakut: Саһылыкаан, Sahılıkaan) is a rural locality (a selo) in Suottunsky Rural Okrug of Ust-Aldansky District in the Sakha Republic, Russia, located 50 kilometers (31 mi) from Borogontsy, the administrative center of the district and 22 kilometers (14 mi) from Ogorodtakh, the administrative center of the rural okrug. Its population as of the 2002 Census was 131.
