= Eselyakh =

Eselyakh Эселях
- Selo
- Interactive map of Eselyakh
- Location of Eselyakh Eselyakh (Sakha Republic)
- Coordinates: 62°55′N 131°03′E
- Country: Russia
- Federal subject: Sakha Republic
- Administrative district: Ust-Aldansky District
- Rural okrugSelsoviet: Onyorsky Rural Okrug
- Elevation: 125 m (410 ft)

Population (2010 Census)
  - Total: 616
  - Estimate (2021): 583 (−5.4%)

Administrative status
  - Capital of: Onyorsky Rural Okrug

Municipal status
  - Municipal district: Ust-Aldansky Municipal District
  - Rural settlement: Onyorsky Rural Settlement
  - Capital of: Onyorsky Rural Settlement
- Time zone: UTC+
- Postal code: 678358
- OKTMO ID: 98652460101

Eselyakh (Russian: Эселях; Yakut: Эһэлээх, Eheleex) is a rural locality (a selo), the only inhabited locality, and the administrative center of Onyorsky Rural Okrug of Ust-Aldansky District in the Sakha Republic, Russia, located 35 kilometers (22 mi) from Borogontsy, the administrative center of the district. Its population as of the 2010 Census was 616; up from 581 recorded in the 2002 Census.
