= Balagannakh, Ust-Aldansky District, Sakha Republic =

Balagannakh Балаганнах
- Selo
- Interactive map of Balagannakh
- Location of Balagannakh Balagannakh (Sakha Republic)
- Coordinates: 62°23′N 131°46′E
- Country: Russia
- Federal subject: Sakha Republic
- Administrative district: Ust-Aldansky District
- Rural okrugSelsoviet: Kurbusakhsky Rural Okrug

Population
  - Estimate (2002): 103 )

Municipal status
  - Municipal district: Ust-Aldansky Municipal District
  - Rural settlement: Kurbusakhsky Rural Settlement
- Time zone: UTC+
- Postal code: 678354
- OKTMO ID: 98652435106

Balagannakh (Russian: Балаганнах; Yakut: Балаҕаннаах, Balağannaax) is a rural locality (a selo) in Kurbusakhsky Rural Okrug of Ust-Aldansky District in the Sakha Republic, Russia, located 91 kilometers (57 mi) from Borogontsy, the administrative center of the district and 18 kilometers (11 mi) from Us-Kyuyol, the administrative center of the rural okrug. Its population as of the 2002 Census was 103.
