= Cheriktey =

Cheriktey Чериктей
- Selo
- Interactive map of Cheriktey
- Location of Cheriktey Cheriktey (Sakha Republic)
- Coordinates: 63°13′N 130°59′E
- Country: Russia
- Federal subject: Sakha Republic
- Administrative district: Ust-Aldansky District
- Rural okrugSelsoviet: Cherikteysky Rural Okrug

Population (2010 Census)
  - Total: 487
  - Estimate (2021): 462 (−5.1%)

Administrative status
  - Capital of: Cherikteysky Rural Okrug

Municipal status
  - Municipal district: Ust-Aldansky Municipal District
  - Rural settlement: Cherikteysky Rural Settlement
  - Capital of: Cherikteysky Rural Settlement
- Time zone: UTC+
- Postal code: 678364
- OKTMO ID: 98652485101

Cheriktey (Russian: Чериктей; Yakut: Чэриктэй, Çeriktey) is a rural locality (a selo), the only inhabited locality, and the administrative center of Cherikteysky Rural Okrug of Ust-Aldansky District in the Sakha Republic, Russia, located 91 kilometers (57 mi) from Borogontsy, the administrative center of the district. Its population as of the 2010 Census was 487, of whom 235 were male and 252 female, up from 416 as recorded during the 2002 Census.
