= Beydinga =

Beydinga Бейдинга
- Selo
- Interactive map of Beydinga
- Location of Beydinga Beydinga (Sakha Republic)
- Coordinates: 62°21′N 130°43′E
- Country: Russia
- Federal subject: Sakha Republic
- Administrative district: Ust-Aldansky District
- Rural okrugSelsoviet: Oltyokhsky Rural Okrug

Population
  - Estimate (2002): 632 )

Administrative status
  - Capital of: Oltyokhsky Rural Okrug

Municipal status
  - Municipal district: Ust-Aldansky Municipal District
  - Rural settlement: Oltyokhsky Rural Settlement
  - Capital of: Oltyokhsky Rural Settlement
- Time zone: UTC+
- Postal code: 678373
- OKTMO ID: 98652455101

Beydinga (Russian: Бейдинга; Yakut: Бэйдиҥэ, Beydiŋe) is a rural locality (a selo), the administrative centre of and one of two settlements, in addition to Arylakh, in Oltyokhsky Rural Okrug of Ust-Aldansky District in the Sakha Republic, Russia. It is located 51 kilometers (32 mi) from Borogontsy, the administrative center of the district. Its population as of the 2002 census was 632.
