= Khonogor =

Khonogor Хоногор
- Selo
- Interactive map of Khonogor
- Location of Khonogor Khonogor (Sakha Republic)
- Coordinates: 62°28′N 130°07′E
- Country: Russia
- Federal subject: Sakha Republic
- Administrative district: Ust-Aldansky District
- Rural okrugSelsoviet: Suottunsky Rural Okrug

Population
  - Estimate (2002): 742 )

Municipal status
  - Municipal district: Ust-Aldansky Municipal District
  - Rural settlement: Suottunsky Rural Settlement
- Time zone: UTC+
- Postal code: 678371
- OKTMO ID: 98652470111

Khonogor (Russian: Хоногор; Yakut: Хоноҕор, Xonoğor) is a rural locality (a selo) in Suottunsky Rural Okrug of Ust-Aldansky District in the Sakha Republic, Russia, located 76 kilometers (47 mi) from Borogontsy, the administrative center of the district, and 4 kilometers (2.5 mi) from Ogorodtakh, the administrative center of the rural okrug. Its population at the 2002 census was 742.
