= Dyupsya =

Dyupsya Дюпся
- Selo
- Interactive map of Dyupsya
- Location of Dyupsya Dyupsya (Sakha Republic)
- Coordinates: 63°01′N 130°45′E
- Country: Russia
- Federal subject: Sakha Republic
- Administrative district: Ust-Aldansky District
- Rural okrugSelsoviet: Dyupsyunsky Rural Okrug
- Founded: 1930

Population
  - Estimate (2002): 1,062 )

Administrative status
  - Capital of: Dyupsyunsky Rural Okrug

Municipal status
  - Municipal district: Ust-Aldansky Municipal District
  - Rural settlement: Dyupsyunsky Rural Settlement
  - Capital of: Dyupsyunsky Rural Settlement
- Time zone: UTC+
- Postal code: 678362
- OKTMO ID: 98652430101

Dyupsya (Russian: Дюпся; Yakut: Дүпсүн, Düpsün) is a rural locality (a selo), the administrative centre of and one of three settlements, in addition to Byadi and Stoyka, in Dyupsyunsky Rural Okrug of Ust-Aldansky District in the Sakha Republic, Russia. It is located 56 kilometers (35 mi) from Borogontsy, the administrative center of the district. Its population as of the 2002 Census was 1,062.
