= Syrdakh =

Syrdakh (Russian: Сырдах) is the name of several rural localities in the Sakha Republic, Russia;

- Syrdakh, Yakutsk, Sakha Republic, a selo in Tulagino-Kildemsky Rural Okrug under the administrative jurisdiction of the city of republic significance of Yakutsk
- Syrdakh, Ust-Aldansky District, Sakha Republic, a selo in Bert-Usovsky Rural Okrug of Ust-Aldansky District
