= Ogorodtakh =

Ogorodtakh Огородтах
- Selo
- Interactive map of Ogorodtakh
- Location of Ogorodtakh Ogorodtakh (Sakha Republic)
- Coordinates: 62°27′N 130°11′E
- Country: Russia
- Federal subject: Sakha Republic
- Administrative district: Ust-Aldansky District
- Rural okrugSelsoviet: Suottunsky Rural Okrug

Population
  - Estimate (2002): 1,212 )

Administrative status
  - Capital of: Suottunsky Rural Okrug

Municipal status
  - Municipal district: Ust-Aldansky Municipal District
  - Rural settlement: Suottunsky Rural Settlement
  - Capital of: Suottunsky Rural Settlement
- Time zone: UTC+
- Postal code: 678051
- OKTMO ID: 98652470101

Ogorodtakh (Russian: Огородтах; Yakut: Оҕуруоттаах, Oğuruottaax) is a rural locality (a selo), the administrative centre of and one of three settlements, in addition to Sasylykan and Khonogor, in Suottunsky Rural Okrug of Ust-Aldansky District in the Sakha Republic, Russia. It is located 72 kilometers (45 mi) from Borogontsy, the administrative center of the district. Its population as of the 2002 Census was 1,212.
