= Chiryapchi =

Chiryapchi Чиряпчи
- Selo
- Interactive map of Chiryapchi
- Location of Chiryapchi Chiryapchi (Sakha Republic)
- Coordinates: 62°35′N 130°40′E
- Country: Russia
- Federal subject: Sakha Republic
- Administrative district: Ust-Aldansky District
- Rural okrugSelsoviet: Bert-Usovsky Rural Okrug

Population
  - Estimate (2002): 8 )

Municipal status
  - Municipal district: Ust-Aldansky Municipal District
  - Rural settlement: Bert-Usovsky Rural Settlement
- Time zone: UTC+
- Postal code: 678372
- OKTMO ID: 98652420106

Chiryapchi (Russian: Чиряпчи; Yakut: Чирэпчи, Çirepçi) is a rural locality (a selo) in Bert-Usovsky Rural Okrug of Ust-Aldansky District in the Sakha Republic, Russia, located 41 kilometers (25 mi) from Borogontsy, the administrative center of the district and 13 kilometers (8.1 mi) from Syrdakh, the administrative center of the rural okrug. Its population as of the 2002 Census was 8.
