= Tanda, Russia =

Tanda Танда
- Selo
- Interactive map of Tanda
- Location of Tanda Tanda (Sakha Republic)
- Coordinates: 62°39′N 131°59′E
- Country: Russia
- Federal subject: Sakha Republic
- Administrative district: Ust-Aldansky District
- Rural okrugSelsoviet: Bayagantaysky Rural Okrug

Population (2010 Census)
  - Total: 699
  - Estimate (2021): 554 (−20.7%)

Administrative status
  - Capital of: Bayagantaysky Rural Okrug

Municipal status
  - Municipal district: Ust-Aldansky Municipal District
  - Rural settlement: Bayagantaysky Rural Settlement
  - Capital of: Bayagantaysky Rural Settlement
- Time zone: UTC+
- Postal code: 678359
- OKTMO ID: 98652410101

Tanda (Russian: Танда; Yakut: Танда) is a rural locality (a selo), the only inhabited locality, and the administrative center of Bayagantaysky Rural Okrug of Ust-Aldansky District in the Sakha Republic, Russia, located 48 kilometers (30 mi) from Borogontsy, the administrative center of the district. Its population as of the 2010 Census was 699; down from 863 recorded in the 2002 Census.
