= Charang =

Charang may refer to:

== Places ==
- Charang, Nepal
- Charang, Khangalassky District, Sakha Republic, Russia
- Charang, Ust-Aldansky District, Sakha Republic, Russia

== Other uses ==
- Charang, a General MIDI program

== See also ==
- Charango, stringed musical instrument
