= Okoyemovka =

Okoyemovka Окоемовка
- Selo
- Interactive map of Okoyemovka
- Location of Okoyemovka Okoyemovka (Sakha Republic)
- Coordinates: 62°25′N 131°48′E
- Country: Russia
- Federal subject: Sakha Republic
- Administrative district: Ust-Aldansky District
- Rural okrugSelsoviet: Kurbusakhsky Rural Okrug

Population
  - Estimate (2002): 221 )

Municipal status
  - Municipal district: Ust-Aldansky Municipal District
  - Rural settlement: Kurbusakhsky Rural Settlement
- Time zone: UTC+
- Postal code: 678354
- OKTMO ID: 98652435111

Okoyemovka (Russian: Окоемовка) is a rural locality (a selo) in Kurbusakhsky Rural Okrug of Ust-Aldansky District in the Sakha Republic, Russia, located 58 kilometers (36 mi) from Borogontsy, the administrative center of the district and 15 kilometers (9.3 mi) from Us-Kyuyol, the administrative center of the rural okrug. Its population as of the 2002 Census was 221.
