= Usun-Kyuyol, Ust-Aldansky District, Sakha Republic =

Usun-Kyuyol Усун-Кюёль
- Selo
- Interactive map of Usun-Kyuyol
- Location of Usun-Kyuyol Usun-Kyuyol (Sakha Republic)
- Coordinates: 62°52′N 130°49′E
- Country: Russia
- Federal subject: Sakha Republic
- Administrative district: Ust-Aldansky District
- Rural okrugSelsoviet: Ospyokhsky 1-y Rural Okrug

Population (2010 Census)
  - Total: 534
  - Estimate (2021): 570 (+6.7%)

Administrative status
  - Capital of: Ospyokhsky 1-y Rural Okrug

Municipal status
  - Municipal district: Ust-Aldansky Municipal District
  - Rural settlement: Ospyokhsky 1-y Rural Settlement
  - Capital of: Ospyokhsky 1-y Rural Settlement
- Time zone: UTC+
- Postal code: 678360
- OKTMO ID: 98652467101

Usun-Kyuyol (Russian: Усун-Кюёль; Yakut: Уһун Күөл, Uhun Küöl) is a rural locality (a selo), the only inhabited locality, and the administrative center of Ospyokhsky 1-y Rural Okrug of Ust-Aldansky District in the Sakha Republic, Russia, located 45 kilometers (28 mi) from Borogontsy, the administrative center of the district. Its population as of the 2010 Census was 534, of whom 270 were male and 264 female, down from 385 as recorded during the 2002 Census.
