= Kylayy =

Kylayy Кылайы
- Selo
- Interactive map of Kylayy
- Location of Kylayy Kylayy (Sakha Republic)
- Coordinates: 63°13′N 132°08′E
- Country: Russia
- Federal subject: Sakha Republic
- Administrative district: Ust-Aldansky District
- Rural okrugSelsoviet: Tyulyakhsky Rural Okrug

Population (2010 Census)
  - Total: 538
  - Estimate (2021): 454 (−15.6%)

Administrative status
  - Capital of: Tyulyakhsky Rural Okrug

Municipal status
  - Municipal district: Ust-Aldansky Municipal District
  - Rural settlement: Tyulyakhsky Rural Settlement
  - Capital of: Tyulyakhsky Rural Settlement
- Time zone: UTC+
- Postal code: 678355
- OKTMO ID: 98652475101

Kylayy (Russian: Кылайы; Yakut: Кылаайы, Kılaayı) is a rural locality (a selo), the only inhabited locality, and the administrative center of Tyulyakhsky Rural Okrug of Ust-Aldansky District in the Sakha Republic, Russia, located 132 kilometers (82 mi) from Borogontsy, the administrative center of the district. Its population as of the 2010 Census was 538, down from 566 recorded during the 2002 Census.
