= Tit-Ary, Ust-Aldansky District, Sakha Republic =

Tit-Ary Тит-Ары
- Selo
- Interactive map of Tit-Ary
- Location of Tit-Ary Tit-Ary (Sakha Republic)
- Coordinates: 62°45′N 131°58′E
- Country: Russia
- Federal subject: Sakha Republic
- Administrative district: Ust-Aldansky District
- Rural okrugSelsoviet: Tit-Arynsky Rural Okrug

Population (2010 Census)
  - Total: 288
  - Estimate (2021): 282 (−2.1%)

Administrative status
  - Capital of: Tit-Arynsky Rural Okrug

Municipal status
  - Municipal district: Ust-Aldansky Municipal District
  - Rural settlement: Tit-Arynsky Rural Settlement
  - Capital of: Tit-Arynsky Rural Settlement
- Time zone: UTC+
- Postal code: 678368
- OKTMO ID: 98652472101

Tit-Ary (Russian: Тит-Ары; Yakut: Тиит Арыы, Tiit Arıı) is a rural locality (a selo), the only inhabited locality, and the administrative center of Tit-Arynsky Rural Okrug of Ust-Aldansky District in the Sakha Republic, Russia, located 60 kilometers (37 mi) from Borogontsy, the administrative center of the district. Its population as of the 2010 Census was 288, down from 298 recorded during the 2002 Census.
