= Dygdal =

Dygdal Дыгдал
- Selo
- Interactive map of Dygdal
- Location of Dygdal Dygdal (Sakha Republic)
- Coordinates: 63°18′N 130°23′E
- Country: Russia
- Federal subject: Sakha Republic
- Administrative district: Ust-Aldansky District
- Rural okrugSelsoviet: Ospyokhsky Rural Okrug

Population (2010 Census)
  - Total: 319
  - Estimate (2021): 238 (−25.4%)

Administrative status
  - Capital of: Ospyokhsky Rural Okrug

Municipal status
  - Municipal district: Ust-Aldansky Municipal District
  - Rural settlement: Ospyokhsky Rural Settlement
  - Capital of: Ospyokhsky Rural Settlement
- Time zone: UTC+
- Postal code: 678357
- OKTMO ID: 98652465101

Dygdal (Russian: Дыгдал; Yakut: Дыгдал, Dıgdal) is a rural locality (a selo), the only inhabited locality, and the administrative center of Ospyokhsky Rural Okrug of Ust-Aldansky District in the Sakha Republic, Russia, located 110 kilometers (68 mi) from Borogontsy, the administrative center of the district. Its population as of the 2010 Census was 319, of whom 156 were male and 163 female, down from 369 as recorded during the 2002 Census.
