= Mayagas =

Mayagas Маягас
- Selo
- Interactive map of Mayagas
- Location of Mayagas Mayagas (Sakha Republic)
- Coordinates: 62°38′N 131°09′E
- Country: Russia
- Federal subject: Sakha Republic
- Administrative district: Ust-Aldansky District
- Rural okrugSelsoviet: Khorinsky Rural Okrug

Population (2010 Census)
  - Total: 593
  - Estimate (2021): 600 (+1.2%)

Administrative status
  - Capital of: Khorinsky Rural Okrug

Municipal status
  - Municipal district: Ust-Aldansky Municipal District
  - Rural settlement: Khorinsky Rural Settlement
  - Capital of: Khorinsky Rural Settlement
- Time zone: UTC+
- Postal code: 678366
- OKTMO ID: 98652480101

Mayagas (Russian: Маягас; Yakut: Майаҕас, Mayağas) is a rural locality (a selo), the only inhabited locality, and the administrative center of Khorinsky Rural Okrug of Ust-Aldansky District in the Sakha Republic, Russia, located 6 kilometers (3.7 mi) from Borogontsy, the administrative center of the district. Its population as of the 2010 Census was 593, up from 496 recorded during the 2002 Census.
