= Tuluna =

Tuluna Тулуна
- Selo
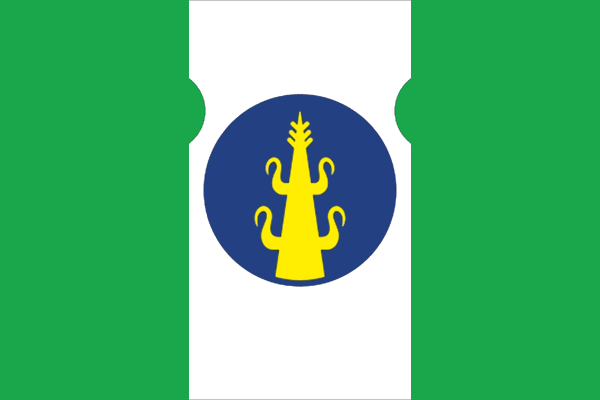
- Flag
- Interactive map of Tuluna
- Location of Tuluna Tuluna (Sakha Republic)
- Coordinates: 62°47′N 131°18′E
- Country: Russia
- Federal subject: Sakha Republic
- Administrative district: Ust-Aldansky District
- Rural okrugSelsoviet: Legyoysky 2-y Rural Okrug

Population (2010 Census)
  - Total: 614
  - Estimate (2021): 573 (−6.7%)

Administrative status
  - Capital of: Legyoysky 2-y Rural Okrug

Municipal status
  - Municipal district: Ust-Aldansky Municipal District
  - Rural settlement: Legyoysky 2-y Rural Settlement
  - Capital of: Legyoysky 2-y Rural Settlement
- Time zone: UTC+
- Postal code: 678367
- OKTMO ID: 98652473101

Tuluna (Russian: Тулуна; Yakut: Тулуна) is a rural locality (a selo), the only inhabited locality, and the administrative center of Legyoysky 2-y Rural Okrug of Ust-Aldansky District in the Sakha Republic, Russia, located 17 kilometers (11 mi) from Borogontsy, the administrative center of the district. Its population as of the 2010 Census was 614, of whom 285 were male and 321 female, up from 570 as recorded during the 2002 Census.
