= Tomtor, Ust-Aldansky District, Sakha Republic =

Tomtor Томтор
- Selo
- Interactive map of Tomtor
- Location of Tomtor Tomtor (Sakha Republic)
- Coordinates: 62°42′N 131°05′E
- Country: Russia
- Federal subject: Sakha Republic
- Administrative district: Ust-Aldansky District
- Rural okrugSelsoviet: Myuryunsky Rural Okrug

Population
  - Estimate (2002): 5 )

Municipal status
  - Municipal district: Ust-Aldansky Municipal District
  - Rural settlement: Myuryunsky Rural Settlement
- Time zone: UTC+
- Postal code: 678350
- OKTMO ID: 98652445111

Tomtor (Russian: Томтор; Yakut: Томтор) is a rural locality (a selo) in Myuryunsky Rural Okrug of Ust-Aldansky District in the Sakha Republic, Russia, located 4 kilometers (2.5 mi) from Borogontsy, the administrative center of the district and the rural okrug. Its population as of the 2002 Census was 5.
