= Khomustakh, Batagaysky Rural Okrug, Ust-Aldansky District, Sakha Republic =

Khomustakh Хомустах
- Selo
- Location of Khomustakh
- Location of Khomustakh Khomustakh (Sakha Republic)
- Coordinates: 62°41′44″N 130°52′13″E
- Country: Russia
- Federal subject: Sakha Republic
- Administrative district: Ust-Aldansky District
- Rural okrug: Batagaysky Rural Okrug

Population (2010 Census)
  - Total: 542

Administrative status
  - Capital of: Batagaysky Rural Okrug

Municipal status
  - Municipal district: Ust-Aldansky Municipal District
  - Rural settlement: Batagaysky Rural Settlement
  - Capital of: Batagaysky Rural Settlement
- Time zone: UTC+9 (UTC+09:00)
- Postal code(s): 678361
- OKTMO ID: 98652405101

Khomustakh (Russian: Хомустах; Yakut: Хомустаах, Xomustaax) is a rural locality (a selo), the only inhabited locality, and the administrative center of Batagaysky Rural Okrug of Ust-Aldansky District in the Sakha Republic, Russia, located 65 kilometers (40 mi) from Borogontsy, the administrative center of the district. Its population as of the 2010 Census was 542, of whom 261 were male and 281 female, down from 639 as recorded during the 2002 Census.
