= Charang, Ust-Aldansky District, Sakha Republic =

Charang Чаранг
- Selo
- Interactive map of Charang
- Location of Charang Charang (Sakha Republic)
- Coordinates: 62°38′N 131°11′E
- Country: Russia
- Federal subject: Sakha Republic
- Administrative district: Ust-Aldansky District
- Rural okrugSelsoviet: Khorinsky 1-y Rural Okrug

Population (2010 Census)
  - Total: 664
  - Estimate (2021): 663 (−0.2%)

Administrative status
  - Capital of: Khorinsky 1-y Rural Okrug

Municipal status
  - Municipal district: Ust-Aldansky Municipal District
  - Rural settlement: Khorinsky 1-y Rural Settlement
  - Capital of: Khorinsky 1-y Rural Settlement
- Time zone: UTC+
- Postal code: 678366
- OKTMO ID: 98652490101

Charang (Russian: Чаранг; Yakut: Чараҥ, Çaraŋ) is a rural locality (a selo), the only inhabited locality, and the administrative center of Khorinsky 1-y Rural Okrug of Ust-Aldansky District in the Sakha Republic, Russia, located 4 kilometers (2.5 mi) from Borogontsy, the administrative center of the district. Its population as of the 2010 Census was 664, of whom 316 were male and 348 female, up from 603 as recorded during the 2002 Census.
