= Balyktakh, Ust-Aldansky District, Sakha Republic =

Balyktakh Балыктах
- Selo
- Interactive map of Balyktakh
- Location of Balyktakh Balyktakh (Sakha Republic)
- Coordinates: 63°04′N 130°25′E
- Country: Russia
- Federal subject: Sakha Republic
- Administrative district: Ust-Aldansky District
- Rural okrugSelsoviet: Nayakhinsky Rural Okrug

Population (2010 Census)
  - Total: 1,020
  - Estimate (2021): 927 (−9.1%)

Administrative status
  - Capital of: Nayakhinsky Rural Okrug

Municipal status
  - Municipal district: Ust-Aldansky Municipal District
  - Rural settlement: Nayakhinsky Rural Settlement
  - Capital of: Nayakhinsky Rural Settlement
- Time zone: UTC+
- Postal code: 678363
- OKTMO ID: 98652450101

Balyktakh (Russian: Балыктах; Yakut: Балыктаах, Balıktaax) is a rural locality (a selo), the only inhabited locality, and the administrative center of Nayakhinsky Rural Okrug of Ust-Aldansky District in the Sakha Republic, Russia, located 73 kilometers (45 mi) from Borogontsy, the administrative center of the district. Its population as of the 2010 Census was 1,020, of whom 504 were male and 516 female, up from 1,002 as recorded during the 2002 Census.
