= Myndaba =

Myndaba Мындаба
- Selo
- Interactive map of Myndaba
- Location of Myndaba Myndaba (Sakha Republic)
- Coordinates: 62°39′N 131°10′E
- Country: Russia
- Federal subject: Sakha Republic
- Administrative district: Ust-Aldansky District
- Rural okrugSelsoviet: Myuryunsky Rural Okrug

Population
  - Estimate (2002): 771 )

Municipal status
  - Municipal district: Ust-Aldansky Municipal District
  - Rural settlement: Myuryunsky Rural Settlement
- Time zone: UTC+
- Postal code: 678350
- OKTMO ID: 98652445106

Myndaba (Russian: Мындаба; Yakut: Мындааба, Mındaaba) is a rural locality (a selo) in Myuryunsky Rural Okrug of Ust-Aldansky District in the Sakha Republic, Russia, located 3 kilometers (1.9 mi) from Borogontsy, the administrative center of the district and the administrative center of the rural okrug. Its population as of the 2002 Census was 771.
