= Surkhang =

Surkhang सुरखाङ
- Village development committee
- Location in Nepal Surkhang (Nepal)
- Coordinates: 29.00°N 84.07°E
- Country: Nepal
- Zone: Dhawalagiri Zone
- District: Mustang District

Population (1991)
  - Total: 651
- Time zone: UTC+5:45 (Nepal Time)

Surkhang is a village development committee in Mustang District in the Dhawalagiri Zone of northern Nepal. At the time of the 1991 Nepal census it had a population of 651 people living in 130 individual households.
