= Kepteni =

Kepteni Кептени
- Selo
- Interactive map of Kepteni
- Location of Kepteni Kepteni (Sakha Republic)
- Coordinates: 62°47′N 130°45′E
- Country: Russia
- Federal subject: Sakha Republic
- Administrative district: Ust-Aldansky District
- Rural okrugSelsoviet: Legyoysky Rural Okrug
- Founded: 1925

Population (2010 Census)
  - Total: 1,081
  - Estimate (2021): 1,063 (−1.7%)

Administrative status
  - Capital of: Legyoysky Rural Okrug

Municipal status
  - Municipal district: Ust-Aldansky Municipal District
  - Rural settlement: Legyoysky Rural Settlement
  - Capital of: Legyoysky Rural Settlement
- Time zone: UTC+
- Postal code: 678360
- OKTMO ID: 98652440101

Kepteni (Russian: Кептени; Yakut: Кэптэни, Kepteni) is a rural locality (a selo) and the administrative center of Legyoysky Rural Okrug of Ust-Aldansky District in the Sakha Republic, Russia, located 36 kilometers (22 mi) from Borogontsy, the administrative center of the district. Its population as of the 2010 Census was 1,081; up from 1,070 recorded in the 2002 Census.
