= Tumul, Ust-Aldansky District, Sakha Republic =

Tumul Тумул
- Selo
- Interactive map of Tumul
- Location of Tumul Tumul (Sakha Republic)
- Coordinates: 62°34′N 130°16′E
- Country: Russia
- Federal subject: Sakha Republic
- Administrative district: Ust-Aldansky District
- Rural okrugSelsoviet: Borogonsky Rural Okrug

Population (2010 Census)
  - Total: 730
  - Estimate (2021): 602 (−17.5%)

Administrative status
  - Capital of: Borogonsky Rural Okrug

Municipal status
  - Municipal district: Ust-Aldansky Municipal District
  - Rural settlement: Borogonsky Rural Settlement
  - Capital of: Borogonsky Rural Settlement
- Time zone: UTC+
- Postal code: 678365
- OKTMO ID: 98652415101

Tumul (Russian: Тумул; Yakut: Тумул) is a rural locality (a selo) and the administrative center of Borogonsky Rural Okrug in Ust-Aldansky District of the Sakha Republic, Russia, located 57 kilometers (35 mi) from Borogontsy, the administrative center of the district. Its population as of the 2010 Census was 730; up from 699 recorded in the 2002 Census.
