= La Bañeza motorcycle race =

Annual motorcycle race in Spain

The La Bañeza motorcycle races take place each August during the feast of the Annunciation of the Virgin Mary in Spain. They began in 1954 as a demonstration.

The circuit covers a large part of the town, but the paddock literally locks in the residents. There are four bike classes at La Bañeza. Two are for modern bikes - pre-GP 125s and current GP 125s.

The race is typically, as a general rule, on the second weekend of August, and can be changed to the third or first weekend, depending on the organization of the Patron Saint Festivities of La Bañeza in honor of Our Lady of the Assumption. On Saturday, the administrative and technical verifications are carried out, prior to the first round of free practice, and then the timed practice sessions to compete for the classification of the Grand Prix of Speed. On Sunday, a warm-up round is held so that the race begins at 12:00 p.m.

Since 1952, different categories have participated in the Grand Prix, some such as 80 cc, 125 Criterium, PreGP 125, 250 cc and Super-Series, which no longer compete today. Currently these are the categories that are allowed to participate. In 2022, a category of electric motorcycles participated in training.
