= Charang, Nepal =

Charang चाराङ
- Village development committee
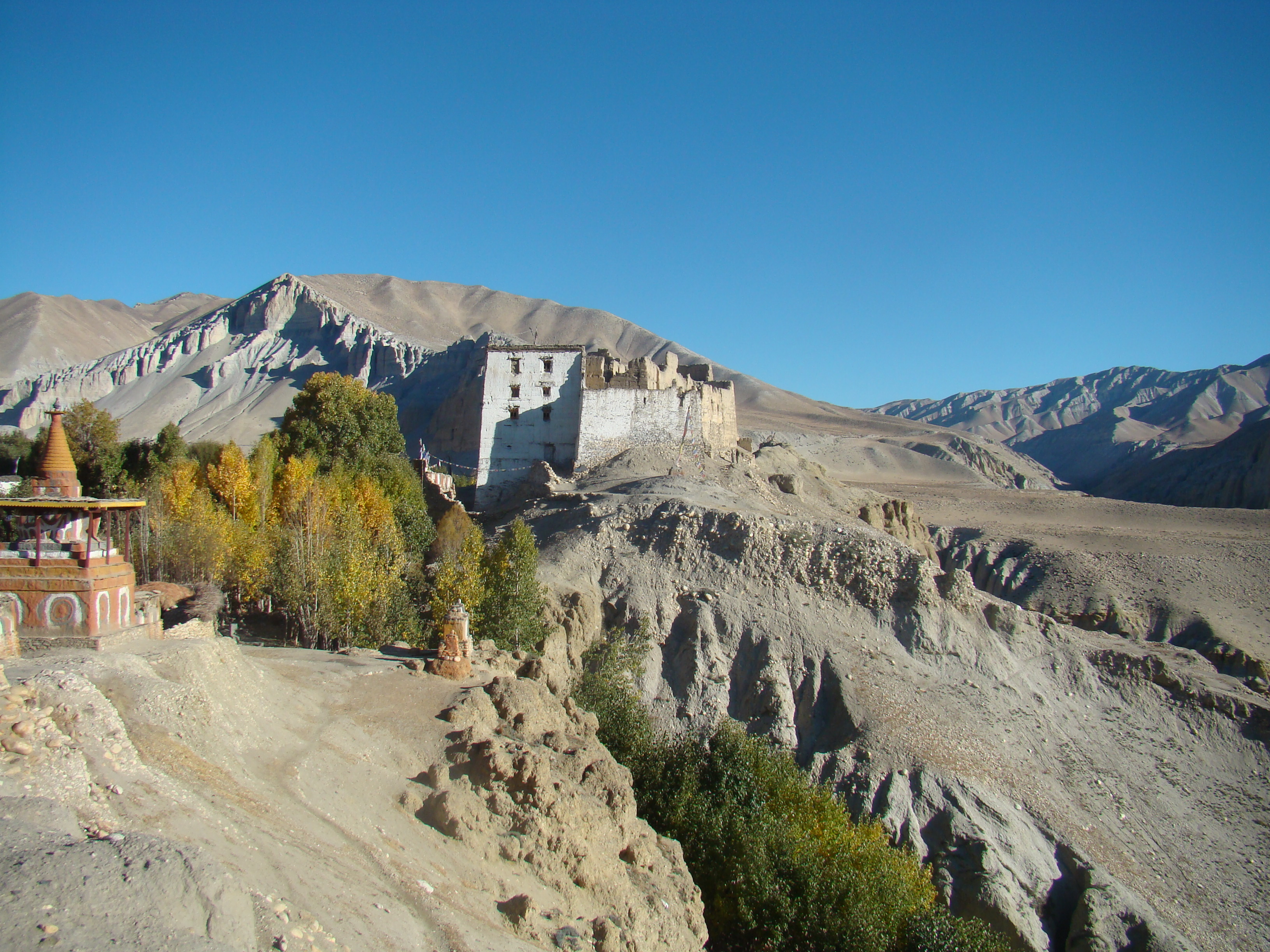
- Charang

- Location in Nepal Charang (Nepal)
- Coordinates: 29°5′34″N 83°55′57″E
- Country: Nepal
- Zone: Dhawalagiri Zone
- District: Mustang District
- Elevation: 3,570 m (11,710 ft)

Population (1991)
  - Total: 682
- Time zone: UTC+5:45 (Nepal Time)

Charang (Tsarang) is a village development committee in Mustang District in the Dhawalagiri Zone of northern Nepal. At the time of the 1991 Nepal census it had a population of 682 people living in 130 individual households.

Charang

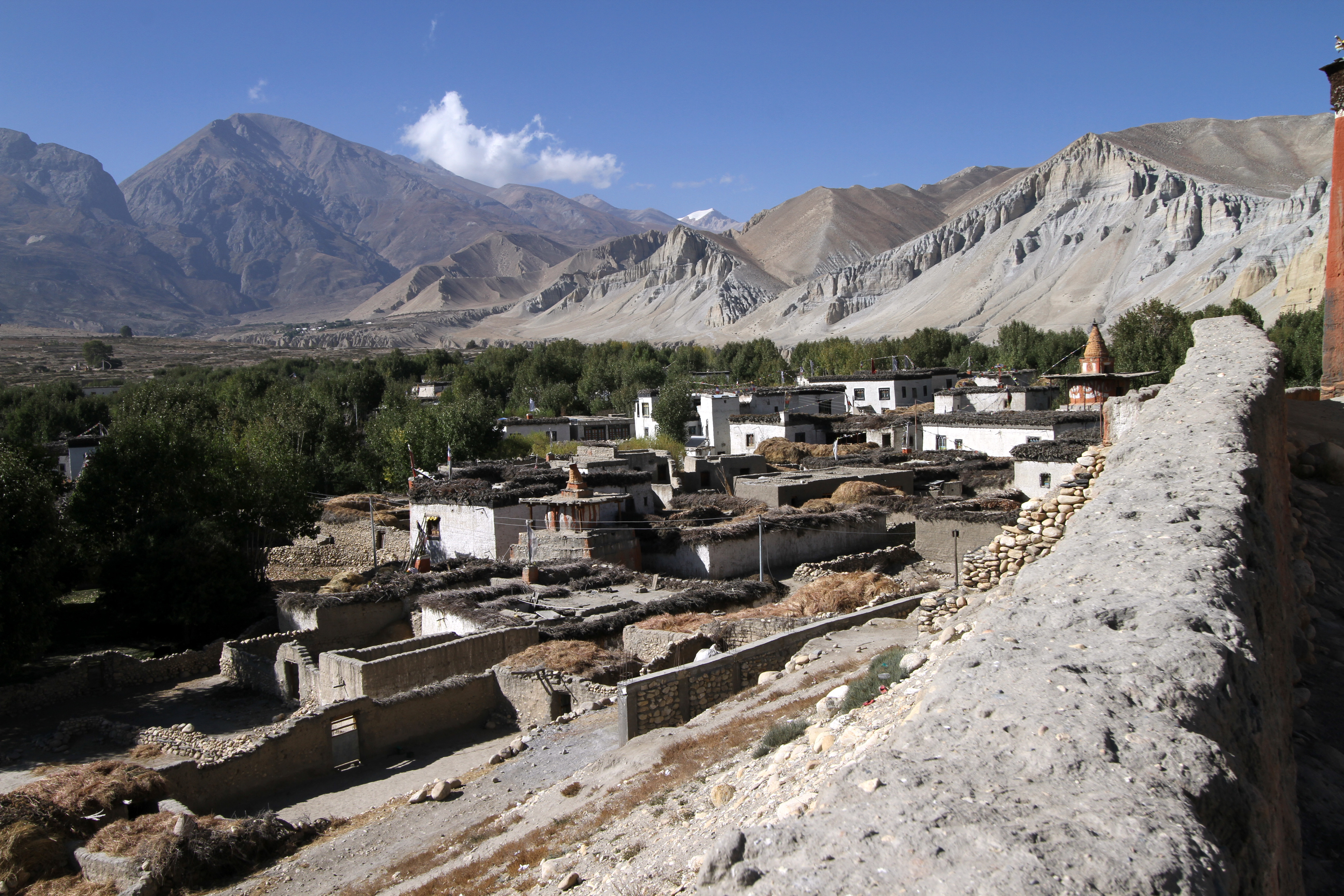

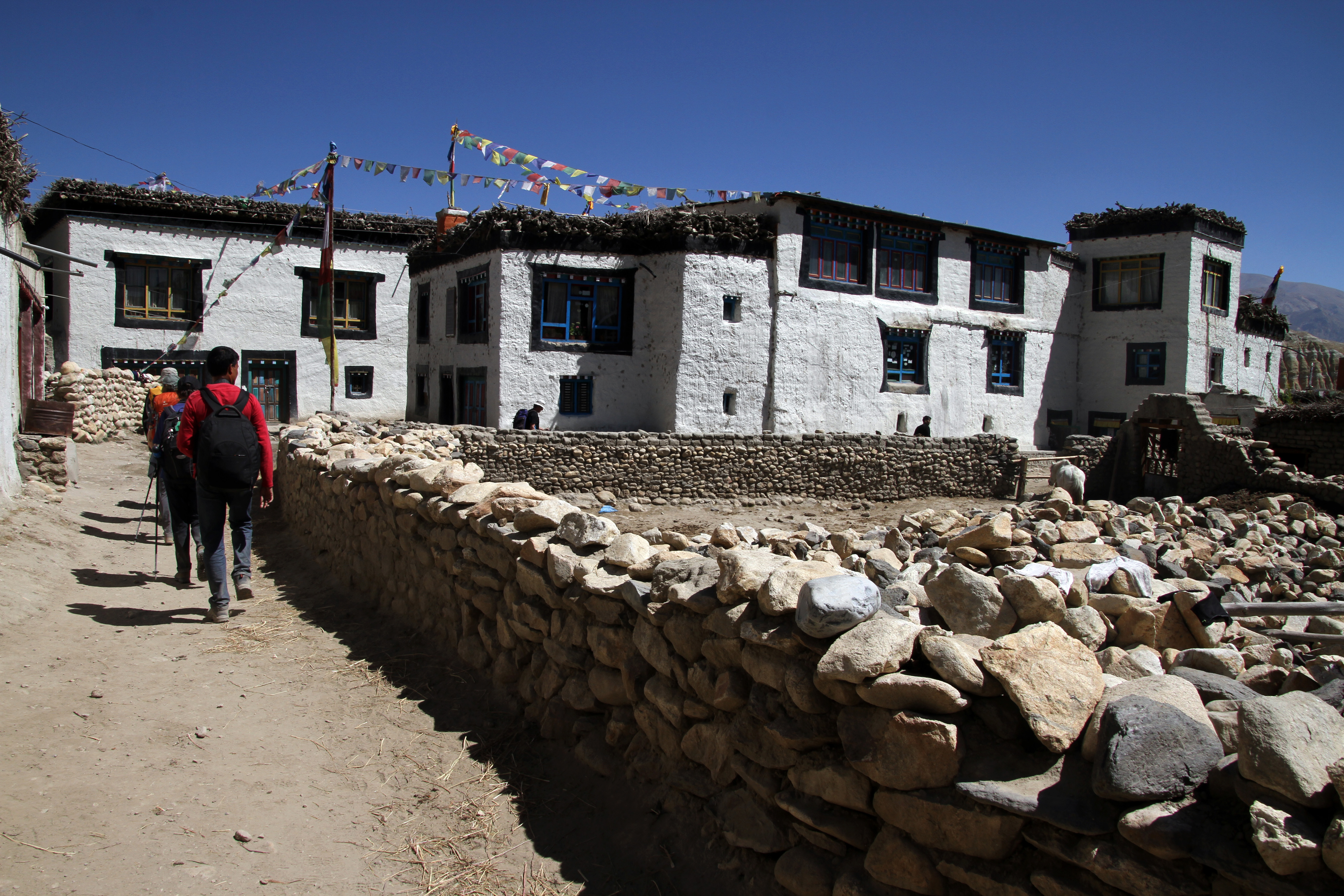

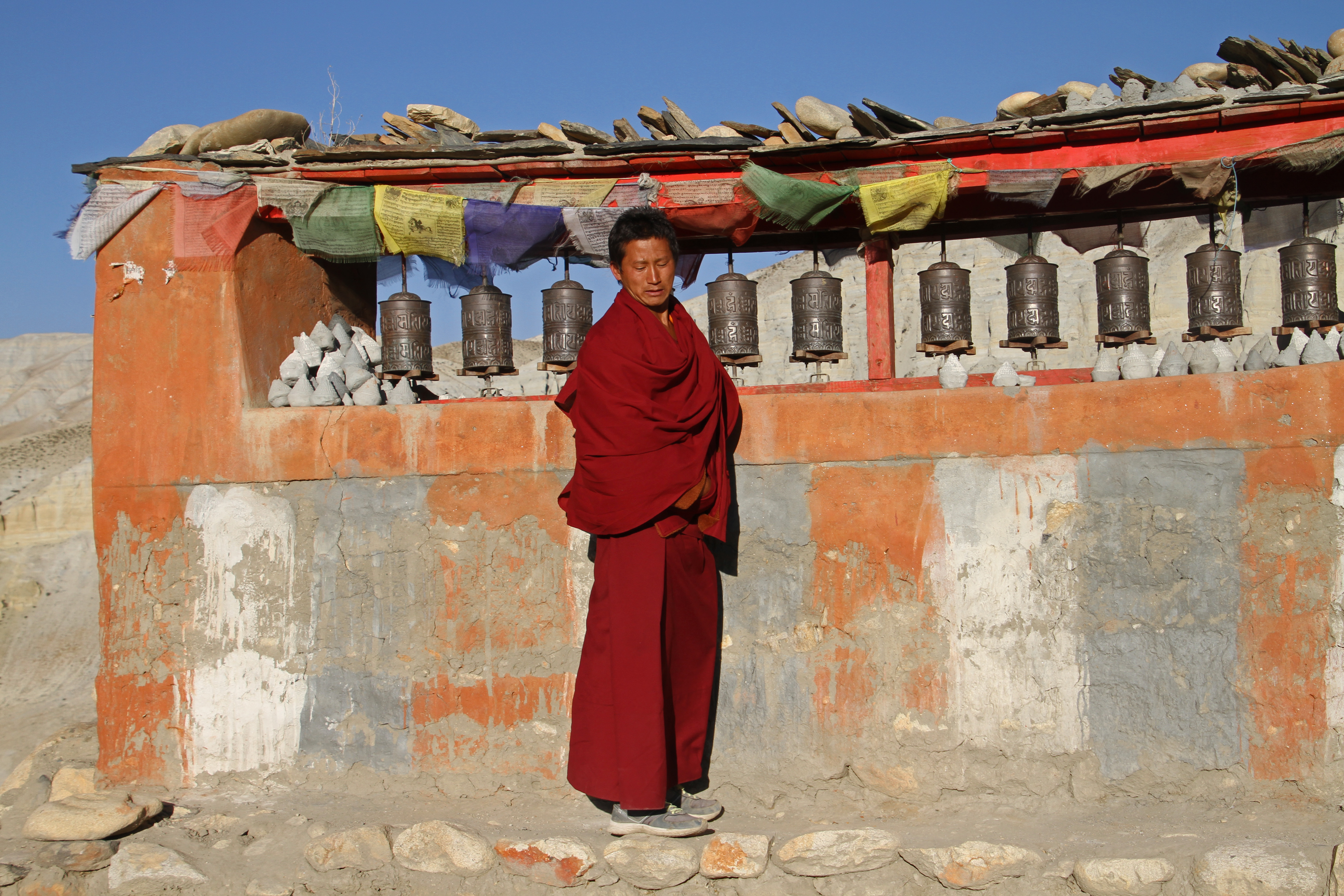

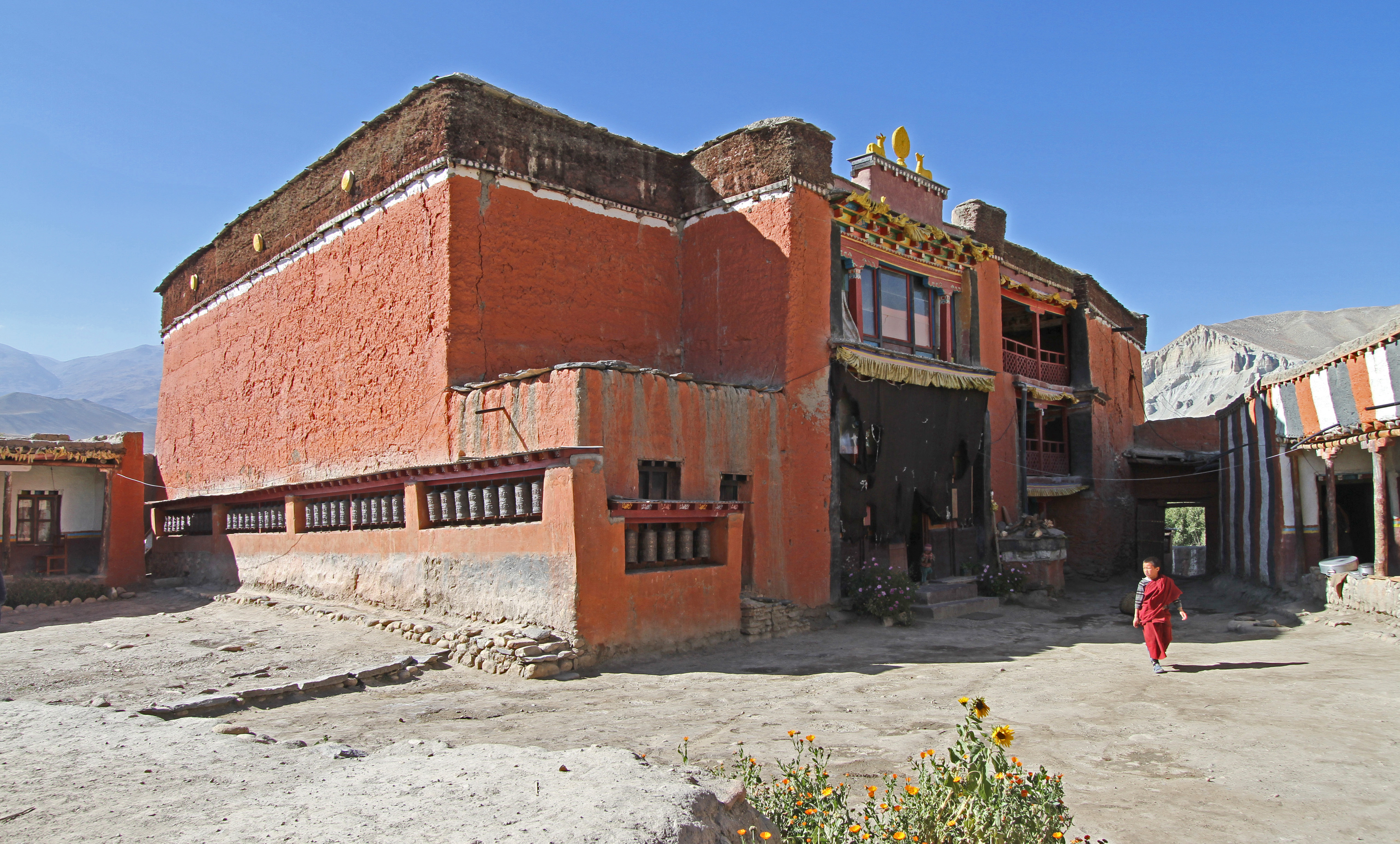

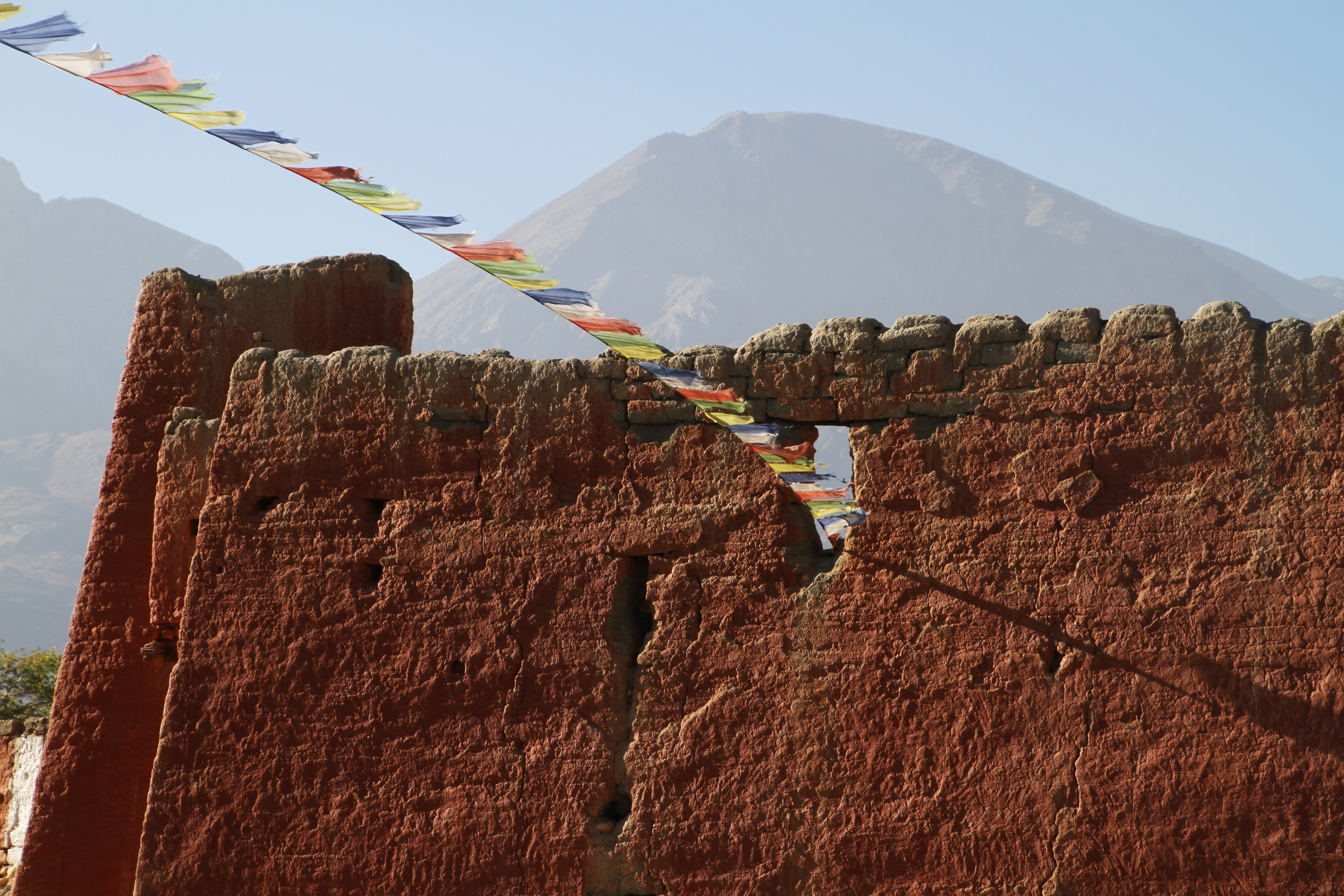

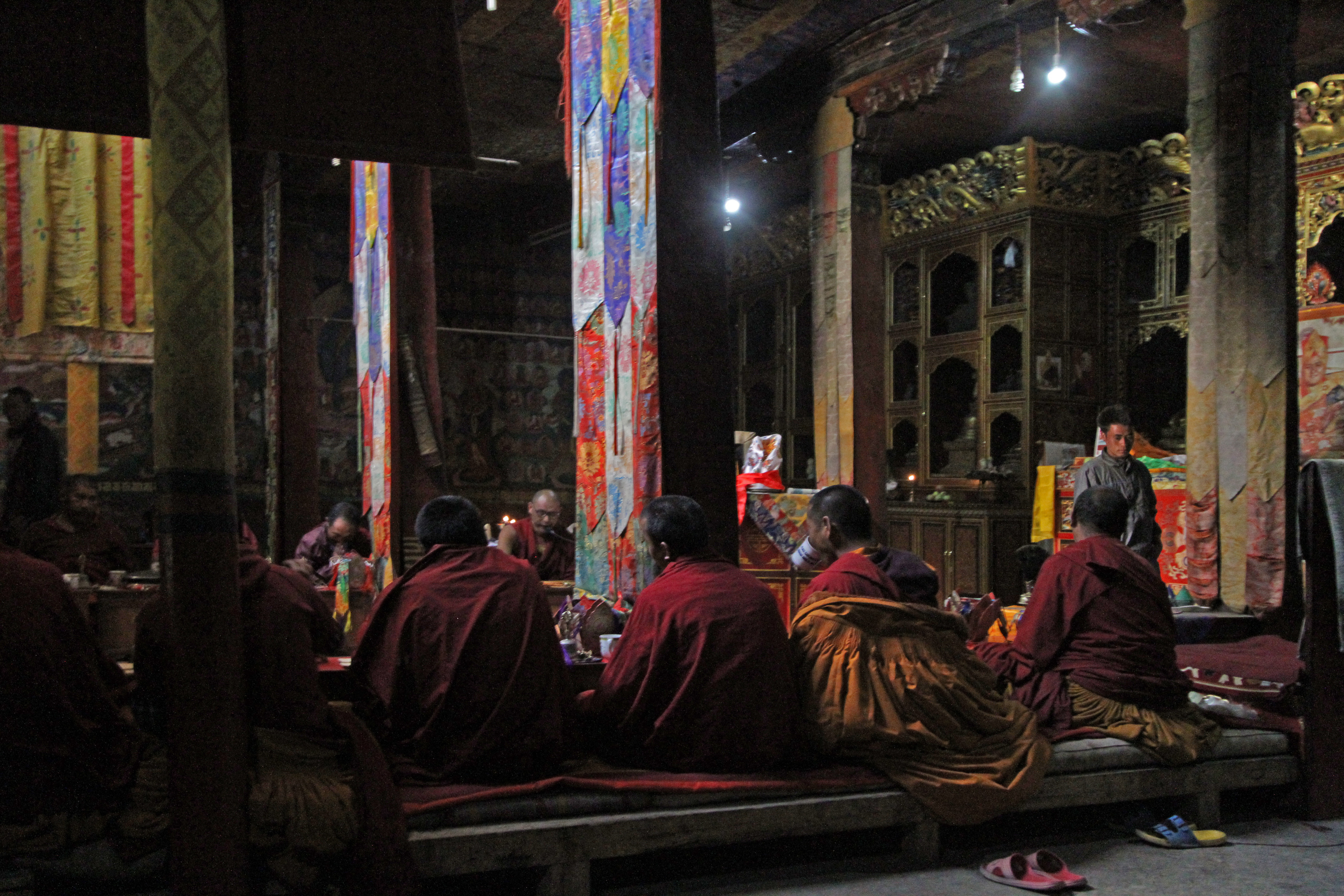

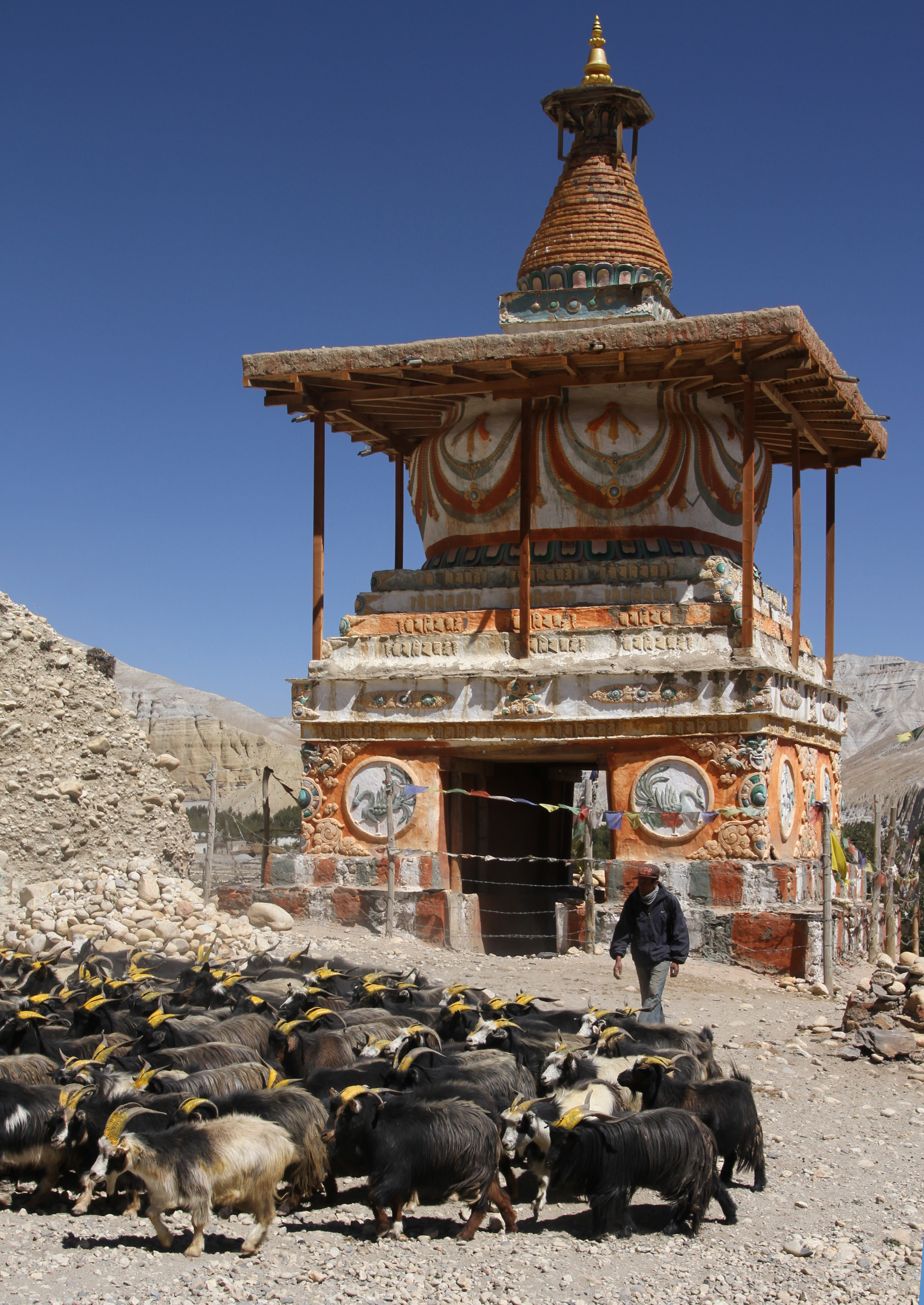

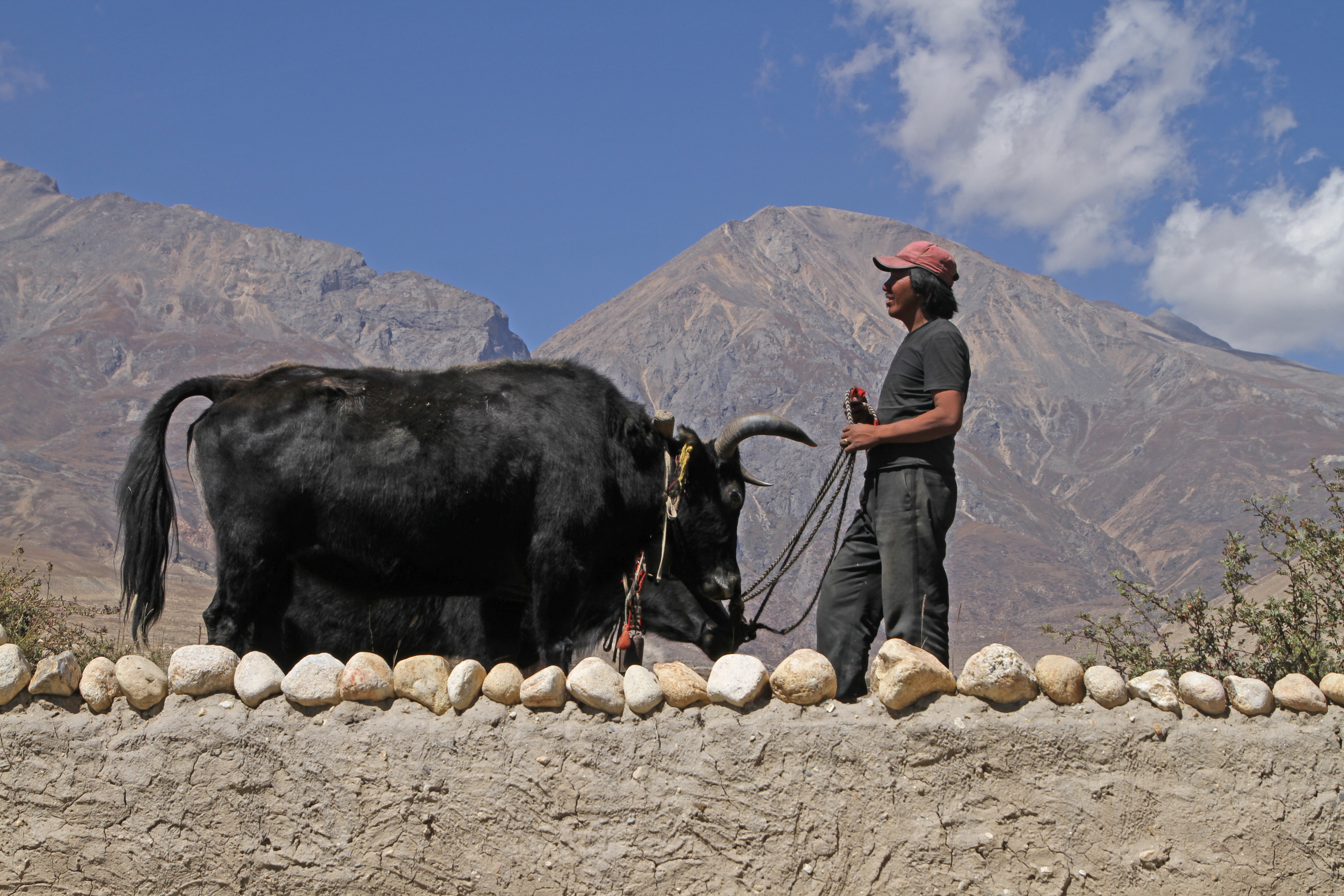
