= Charanga (Spain) =

Spanish wind/percussion amateur marching band

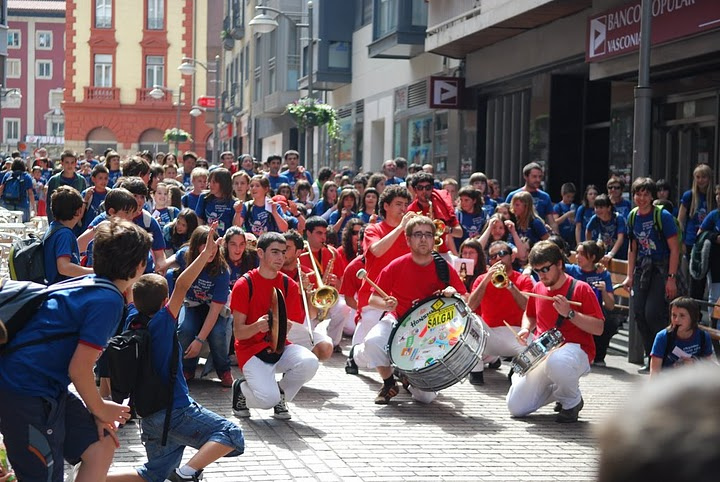
A charanga performing in a pasacalles.

A Charanga is a small amateur marching band with wind and percussion instruments that plays festivals mainly in Northern Spain, Aragon, Basque Country, Castilla-La Mancha, Castilla y León and the Valencian Community. In the past, the name charanga also applied to certain military musical bands of the Spanish Army and as ship's company bands in the Spanish Navy.

Charangas mainly play popular, traditional songs that have simple rhythms and often feature risqué lyrics. Also, they often play medleys.

They frequently play at pasacalles, a performance which moves along the streets of a town, while the public follows the band and dances to its tunes.

They are usually composed of about 5 to 10 musicians and can be amateurs who meet for the festivities, or professionals who go from town to town paid by city councils or groups of people. Many middle and high school music students take advantage of their knowledge to earn extra income by playing in the charanga.

They perform popular songs with cheeky lyrics and the musical hits of the year, typical songs depending on the geographical location, some also compose their own songs or make their own potpourris.

== Instrumentation ==
=== Civil charanga ===
Normally a charanga is composed of percussion (bass drum, snare drum and cymbals), the brass section (trombones, euphonium, trumpets and tubas) and finally the woodwind section (alto saxophones, tenor saxophone, piccolos and clarinets).

=== Military charanga - Army ===
During the 1840s the typical Spanish Army light infantry charanga was organized in the following instrumental composition:

- 12 bugles
- 4 cornets
- 4 ophicleides
- 4 trombones
- 2-3 natural horns

Before that, in the 1830s, the bands were composed of

- Bugles
- Buccin
- Natural trumpets
- Flute
- Clarinet
- Trombone
- Military serpent

Later on these instruments would be joined and/or supplemented by:

- 2-5 clarinets
- 1-2 flute/s
- 1 piccolo
- 2-3 tubas
- 2 baritone horns
- 2-4 trumpets
- snare drum
