= Ust-Aldansky District =

Ust-Aldansky District Усть-Алданский улус (Russian)
- District

Other transcription(s)
  - Sakha: Уус-Алдан улууhа
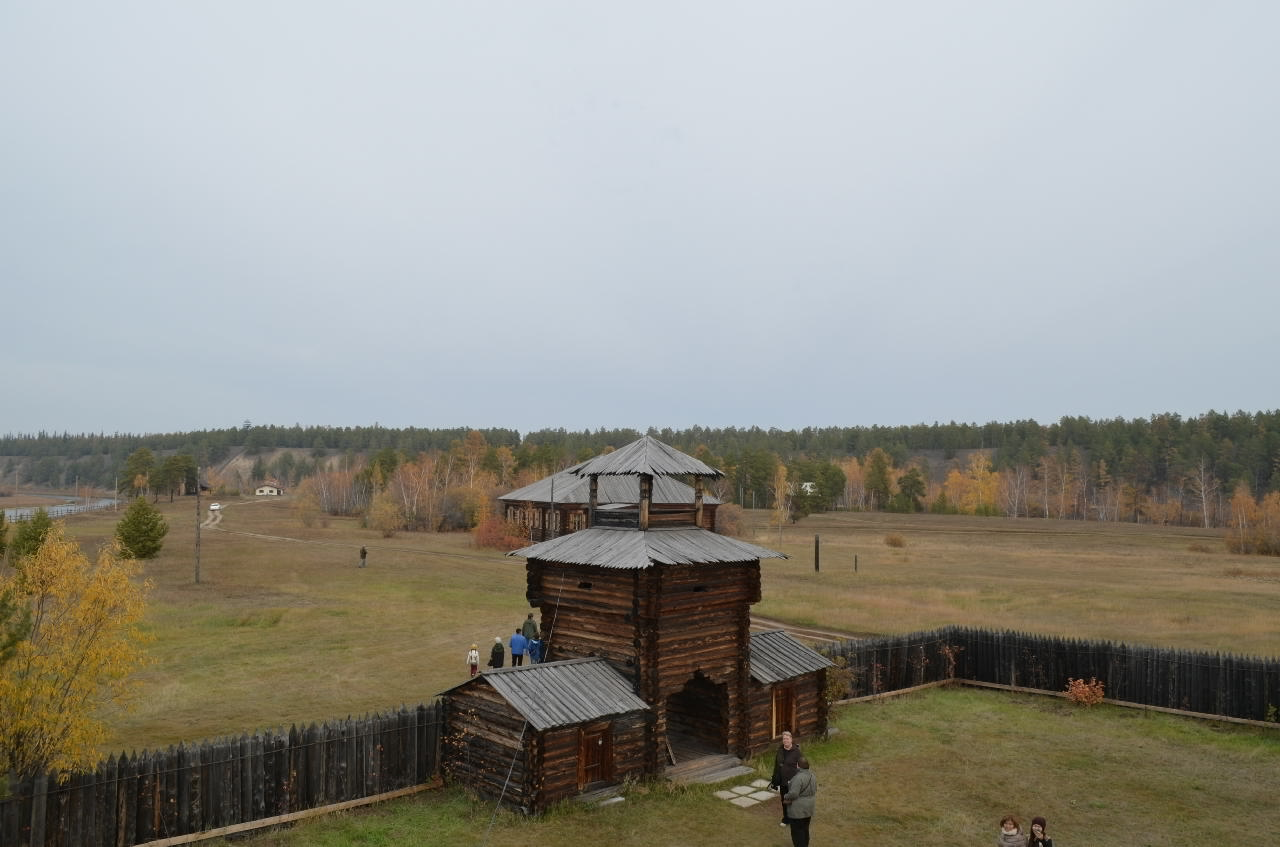
- Druzhba Museum, Ust-Aldansky District

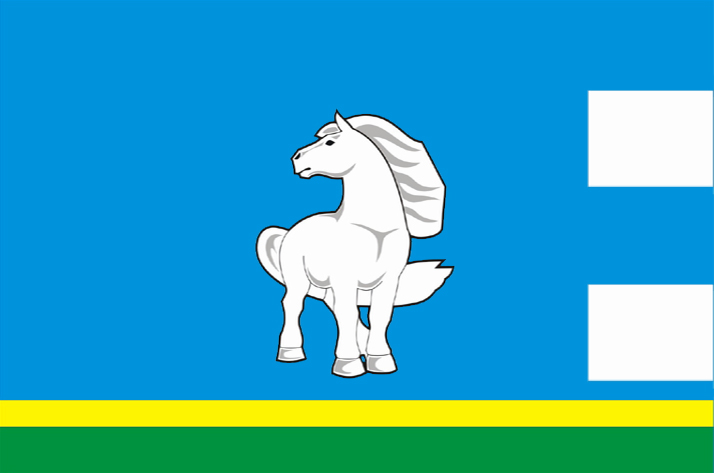
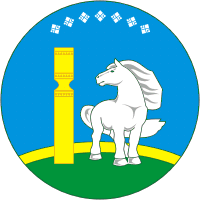
- Flag Coat of arms
- Location of Ust-Aldansky District in the Sakha Republic
- Coordinates: 58°40′N 125°21′E
- Country: Russia
- Federal subject: Sakha Republic
- Established: January 9, 1930
- Administrative center: Borogontsy

Area
  - Total: 18,300 km^{2} (7,100 sq mi)

Population (2010 Census)
  - Total: 22,155
  - Density: 1.21/km^{2} (3.14/sq mi)
  - Urban: 0%
  - Rural: 100%

Administrative structure
  - Administrative divisions: 21 Rural okrugs
  - Inhabited localities: 35 rural localities

Municipal structure
  - Municipally incorporated as: Ust-Aldansky Municipal District
  - Municipal divisions: 0 urban settlements, 21 rural settlements
- Time zone: UTC+
- OKTMO ID: 98652000

Ust-Aldansky District (Russian: Усть-Алда́нский улу́с; Yakut: Уус-Алдан улууһа, Uus-Aldan uluuha, Yakut pronunciation: [uːs-aldan uluːha]) is an administrative and municipal district (raion, or ulus), one of the thirty-four in the Sakha Republic, Russia. It is located in the center of the republic and borders with Kobyaysky District in the north, Tomponsky District in the northeast, Tattinsky District in the east, Churapchinsky District in the southeast, Megino-Kangalassky District in the south, and with Namsky District in the west. The area of the district is 18,300 square kilometers (7,100 sq mi). Its administrative center is the rural locality (a selo) of Borogontsy. Population: 22,155 (2010 census); 22,372 (2002 Census); 21,389 (1989 Soviet census). The population of Borogontsy accounts for 23.6% of the district's total population.

== Geography ==
The landscape of the district is mostly flat. Its main rivers include the Lena and the Aldan. There are many lakes in the district, the largest of which are Lakes Myuryu, Oner, and Targyldzhyma.

== History ==
The district was established on January 9, 1930.

== Demographics ==
As of the 2021 Census, the ethnic composition was as follows:

- Yakuts: 98.9%
- Evenks: 0.6%
- Russians: 0.2%
- other ethnicities: 0.3%

== Economy ==
The economy of the district is mostly based on agriculture.

== Inhabited localities ==
Municipal composition
Rural settlements	Population	Male	Female	Rural localities in jurisdiction*
Batagaysky Nasleg (Батагайский)	542	261 (48.2%)	281 (51.8%)	**selo of Khomustakh**
Bayagantaysky Nasleg (Баягантайский)	699	350 (50.1%)	349 (49.9%)	**selo of Tanda**
Bert-Usovsky Nasleg (Берт-Усовский)	783	380 (48.5%)	403 (51.5%)	**selo of Syrdakh**; selo of Chiryapchi
Borogonsky Nasleg (Борогонский)	1,009	506 (50.1%)	503 (49.9%)	**selo of Tumul**; selo of Ary-Tit; selo of Elyasin
Byariyinsky Nasleg (Бярийинский)	297	159 (53.5%)	138 (46.5%)	**selo of Byariye**
Dyupsyunsky Nasleg (Дюпсюнский)	1,536	752 (49.0%)	784 (51.0%)	**selo of Dyupsya**; selo of Byadi; selo of Stoyka
Kurbusakhsky Nasleg (Курбусахский)	1,105	562 (50.9%)	543 (49.1%)	**selo of Us-Kyuyol**; selo of Balagannakh; selo of Okoyemovka
Legyoysky Nasleg (Легёйский)	1,527	719 (47.1%)	808 (52.9%)	**selo of Kepteni**; selo of Daly; selo of Khomustakh
Legyoysky 2-y Nasleg (Легёйский 2-й)	614	285 (46.4%)	329 (53.6%)	**selo of Tuluna**
Myuryunsky Nasleg (Мюрюнский)	6,015	2,813 (46.8%)	3,202 (53.2%)	**selo of Borogontsy** (Administrative centre of the district); selo of Myndaba; selo of Tomtor
Nayakhinsky Nasleg (Наяхинский)	1,020	504 (49.4%)	516 (50.6%)	**selo of Balyktakh**
Oltyokhsky Nasleg (Ольтёхский)	1,040	502 (48.3%)	538 (51.7%)	**selo of Beydinga**; selo of Arylakh
Onyorsky Nasleg (Онёрский)	616	298 (48.4%)	318 (51.6%)	**selo of Eselyakh**
Ospyokhsky Nasleg (Оспёхский)	319	156 (48.9%)	163 (51.1%)	**selo of Dygdal**
Ospyokhsky 1-y Nasleg (Оспёхский 1-й)	534	270 (50.6%)	264 (49.4%)	**selo of Usun-Kyuyol**
Suottunsky Nasleg (Суоттунский)	1,929	938 (48.6%)	991 (51.4%)	**selo of Ogorodtakh**; selo of Sasylykan; selo of Khonogor
Tit-Arynsky Nasleg (Тит-Арынский)	238	143 (49.7%)	145 (50.3%)	**selo of Tit-Ary**
Tyulyakhsky Naleg (Тюляхский)	538	269 (50.0%)	269 (50.0%)	**selo of Kylayy**
Khorinsky Nalseg (Хоринский)	593	276 (46.5%)	317 (53.5%)	**selo of Mayagas**
Khorinsky 1-y Nalseg (Хоринский 1-й)	664	316 (47.6%)	348 (52.4%)	**selo of Charang**
Cherikteysky Nasleg (Чериктейский)	487	235 (48.3%)	252 (51.7%)	**selo of Cheriktey**

Divisional source:
Population source:
*Administrative centers are shown in bold
