= Borogontsy =

Borogontsy Борогонцы
- Selo
- Interactive map of Borogontsy
- Location of Borogontsy Borogontsy (Sakha Republic)
- Coordinates: 62°40′N 131°08′E
- Country: Russia
- Federal subject: Sakha Republic
- Administrative district: Ust-Aldansky District
- Rural okrugSelsoviet: Myuryunsky Rural Okrug
- Founded: 1805
- Elevation: 124 m (407 ft)

Population (2010 Census)
  - Total: 5,222
  - Estimate (2021): 6,416 (+22.9%)

Administrative status
  - Capital of: Myuryunsky Rural Okrug

Municipal status
  - Municipal district: Ust-Aldansky Municipal District
  - Rural settlement: Myuryunsky Rural Settlement
  - Capital of: Myuryunsky Rural Settlement
- Time zone: UTC+
- Postal code: 678350
- OKTMO ID: 98652445101

Borogontsy (Russian: Борогонцы; Yakut: Бороҕон, Boroğon) is a rural locality (a selo), the administrative centre of and one of three settlements, in addition to Myndaba and Tomtor, in Myuryunsky Rural Okrug of Ust-Aldansky District in the Sakha Republic, Russia in addition to being the administrative centre of Myuryunsky Rural Okrug to which the same three settlements are subordinated. Its population as of the 2010 Census was 5,222, down from 5,458 recorded during the 2002 Census.
