= Char Dham, Nepal =

Four Hindu religious sites in Nepal

The Char Dham of Nepal (Nepali: नेपालको चार धाम) is a set of four Hindu religious sites in Nepal. They are Pashupat Kshetra, Mukti Kshetra, Ruru Kshetra and Baraha Kshetra.

Char Dham, Nepal

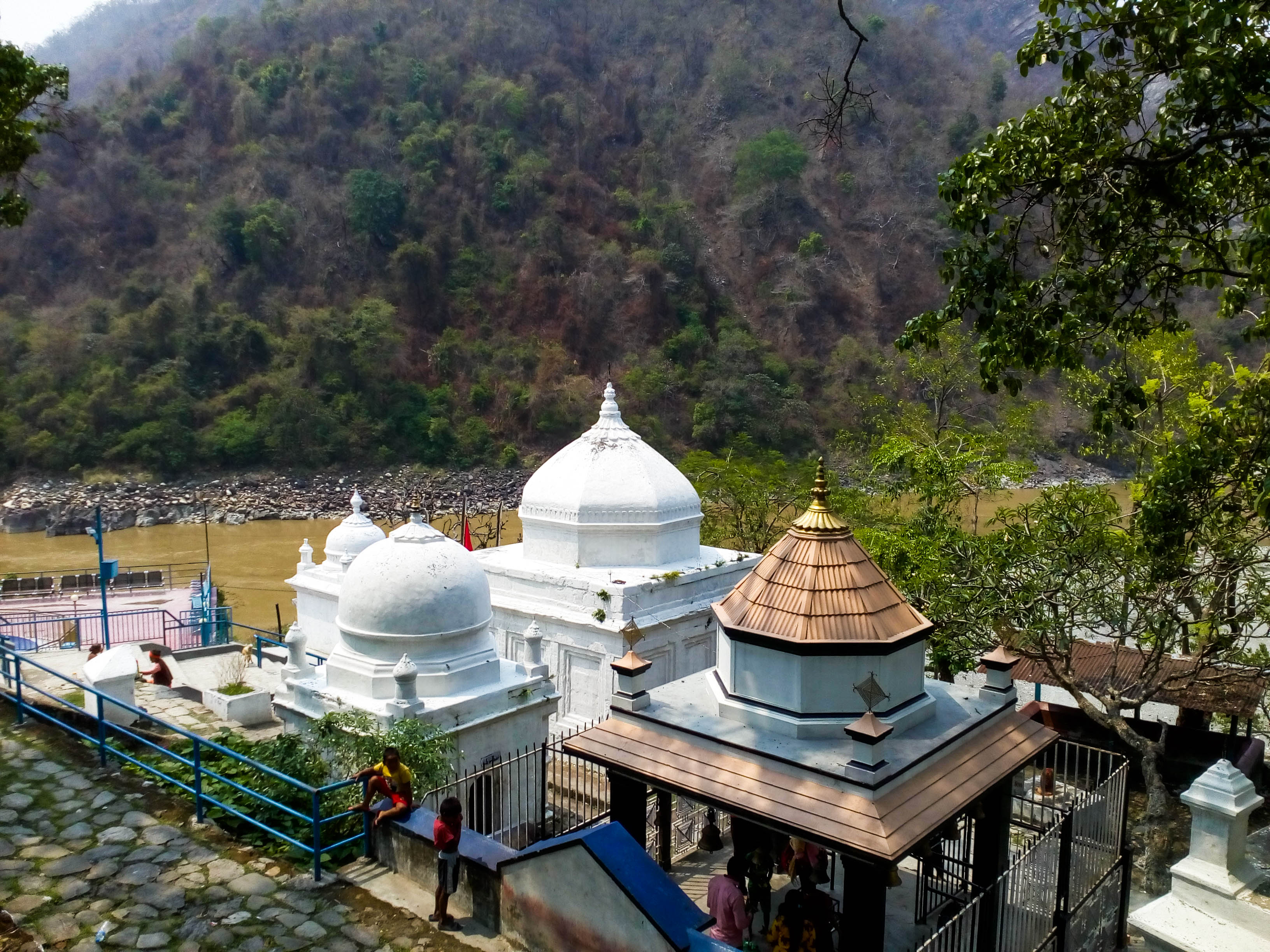
Barahachhetra temple

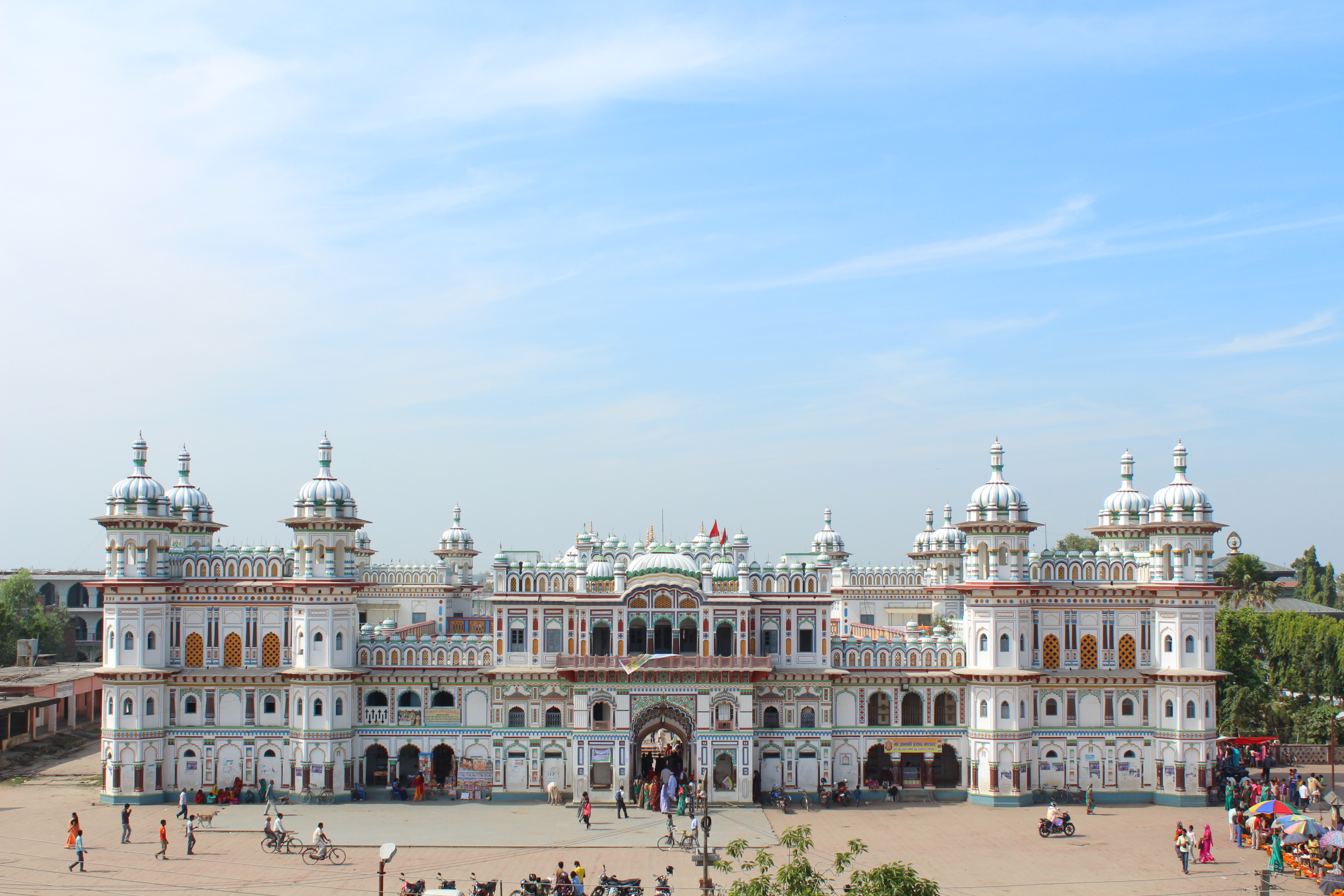
Janki Mandir

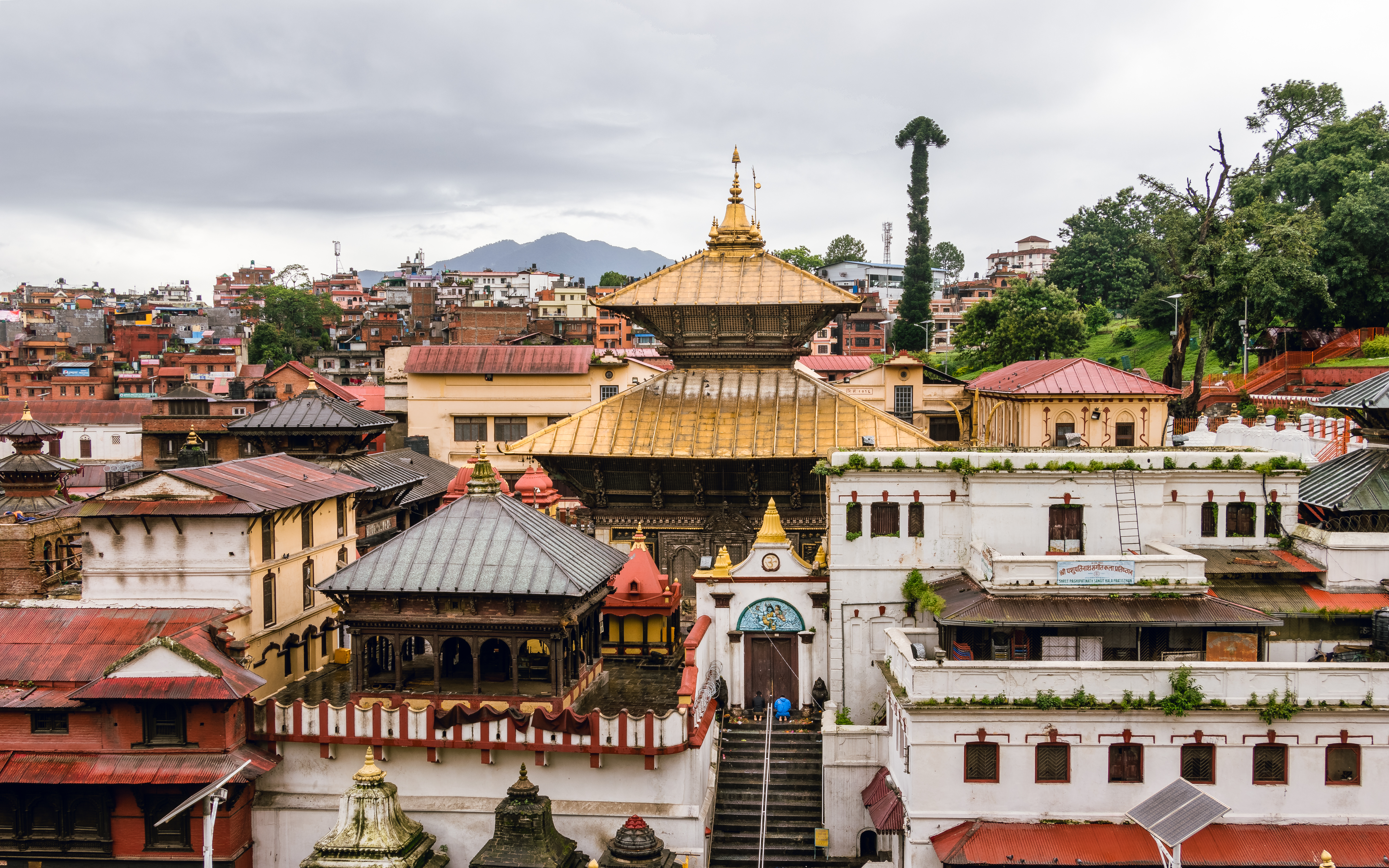
Pashupatinath Temple

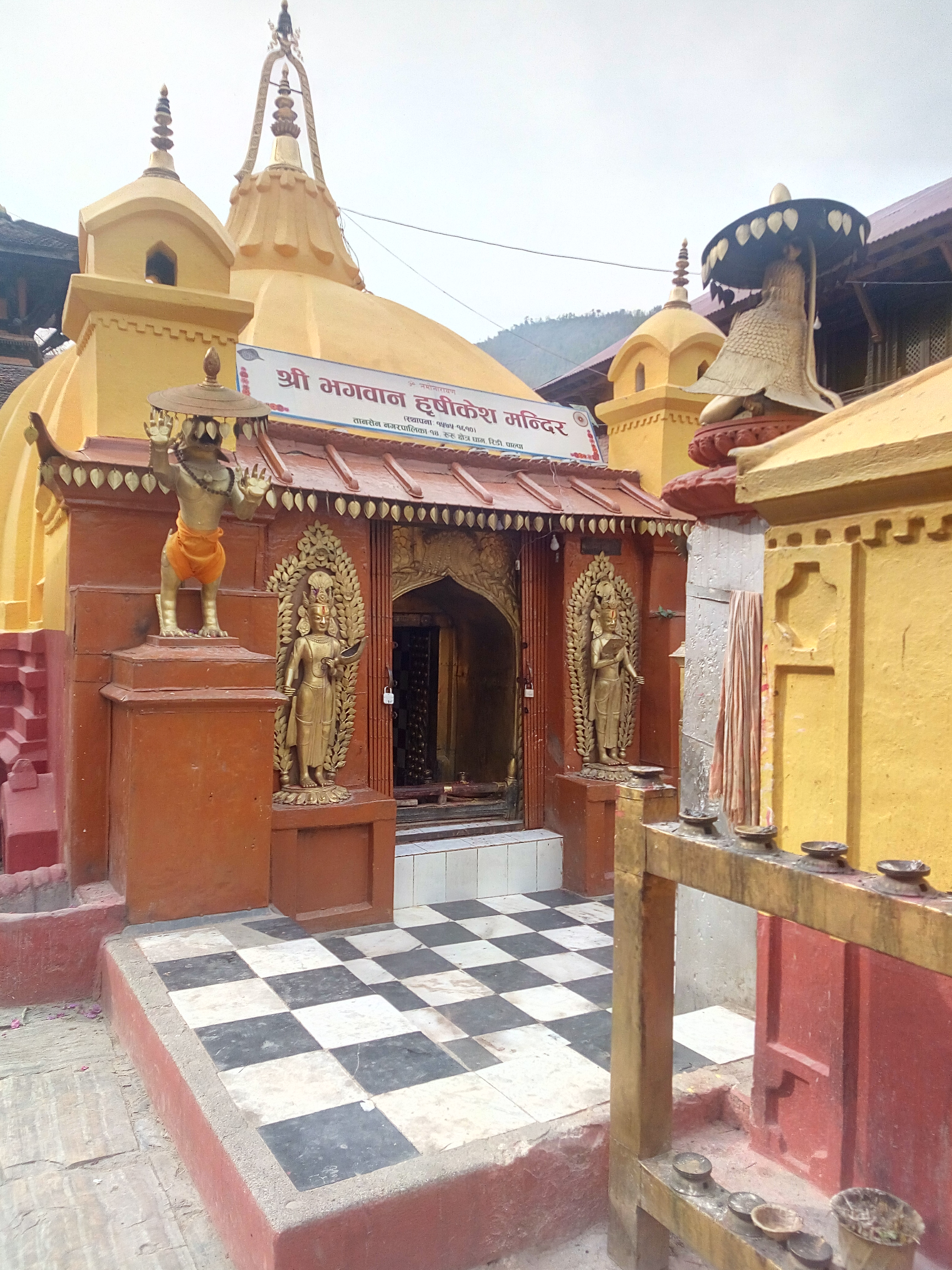
Rishikesh Mandir

== Pashupati Kshetra ==
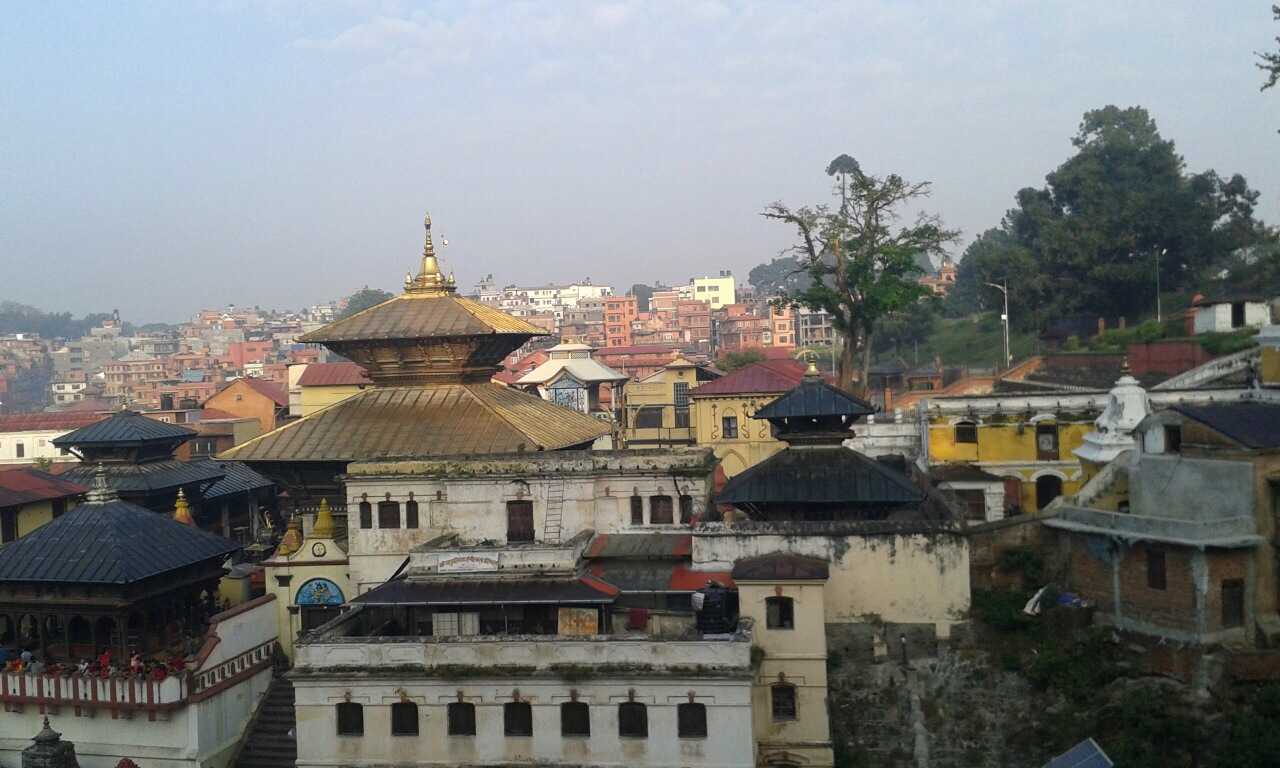

Pashupat Kshetra is situated on the bank of holy Bagmati River in Kathmandu, the capital of Nepal. The Pashupatinath temple is the famous and sacred temple that serves the seat of pashupatinath. There is harihar kshetra in place of pashupati kshetra.

== Mukti Kshetra ==
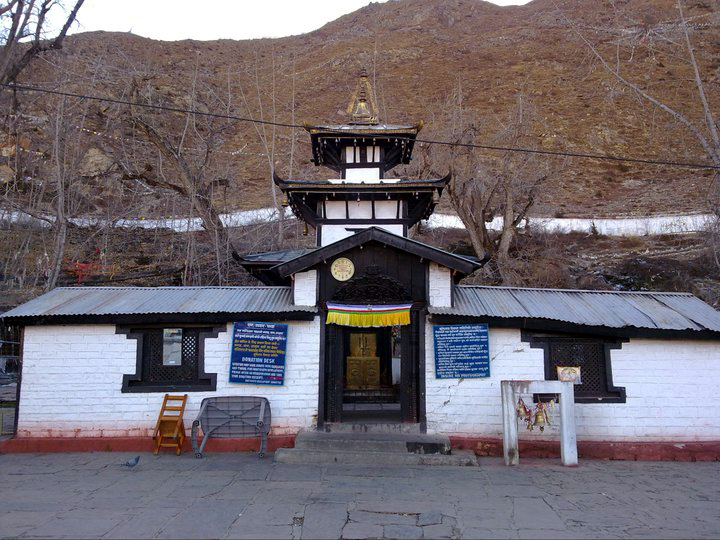

Mukti Kshetra is situated in Mustang district and is sacred to both Hindus and Buddhists.

== Ruru Kshetra ==
Ruru Kshetra is situated on the bank of Kaligandaki river. Hindus visits here during Maghe Sankranti and take holy bath in Kaligandaki river and worship in Rishikesh Temple believing to obtain moksha.

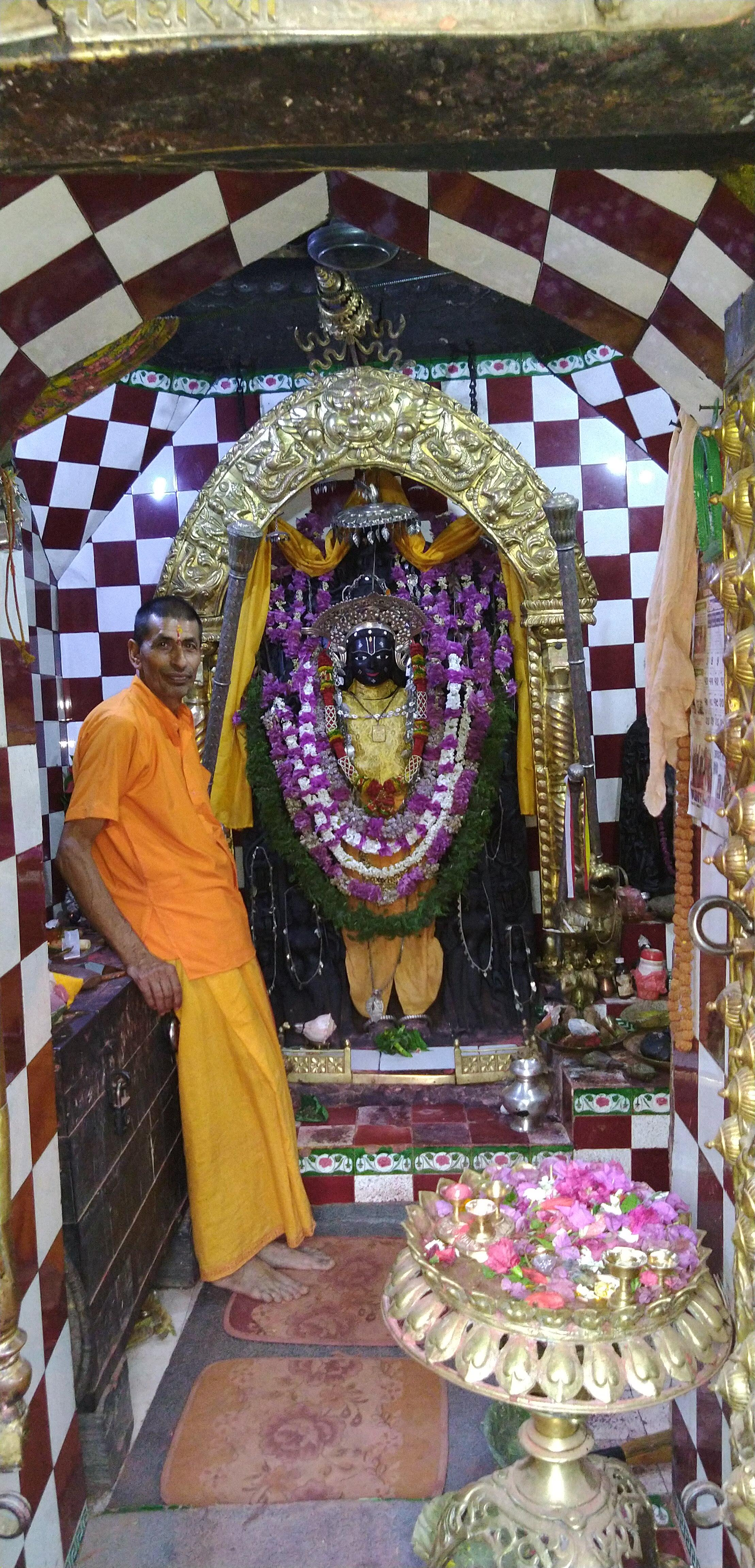
Rishikeshdham Temple

== Baraha Kshetra ==
Baraha Kshetra is situated on the confluence of Koka and Koshi river in Sunsari district.

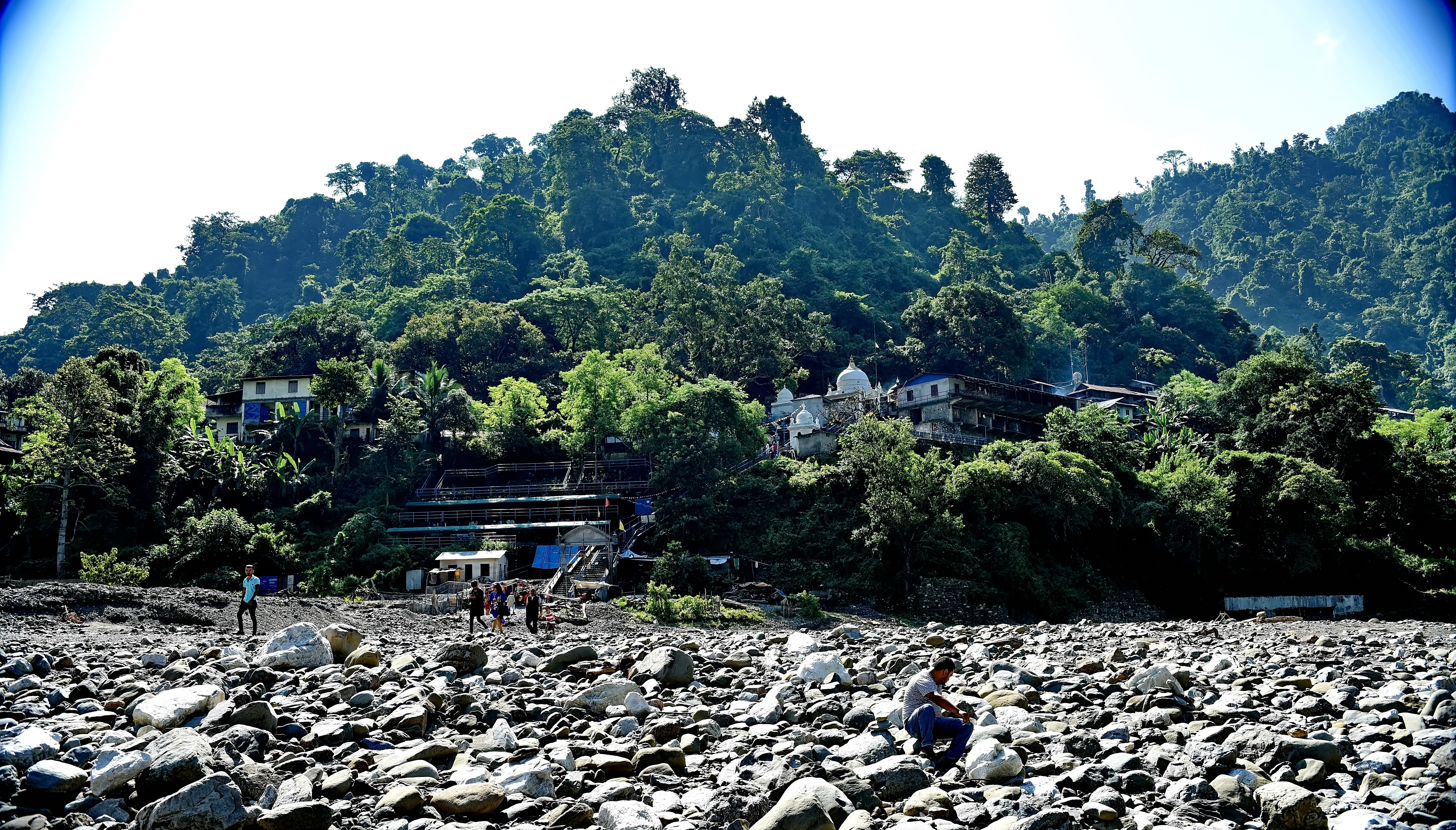
