= Gyawali =

Gyawali ज्ञवाली
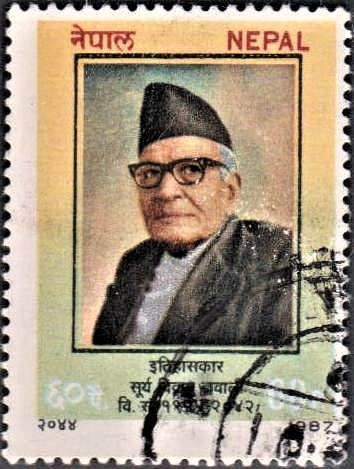
- Nepali stamp featuring Historian Surya Bikram Gyawali c. 1987
- Pronunciation: [gjʌ̃wali]
- Language: Nepali

Origin
- Language: Khas language
- Derivation: Gyawa
- Meaning: Inhabitants of Ruru Kshetra(Present:Ruru Kshetra )

Other names
- Derivatives: Gyawali, Gnawali

Gyawali (Nepali: ज्ञवाली) is a surname or family name found in Nepal.It is also written as Gnawali. The surname belongs to a Brahmin caste in Khas group, an Indo-Aryan ethno-linguistic group in Nepal

Gyawali family were original inhabitants of Ruru Kshetra a holy sacred territory of Gulmi district

== Etymology ==
Gyawali is historically believed to have an origin from present day Ruru Kshetra . 'Gyawa' is the medieval endangered name of Ruru Kshetra of Gulmi. The word Gyawali was historically derived as the inhabitants of Gyawa Kshetra.

== Notable people ==
Notable people with the name include:

- Surya Bikram Gyawali, a Nepali historian
- Shova Gyawali, an author and media entrepreneur
- Radha Gyawali, Former Minister
- Pradeep Gyawali, Nepalese politician
- Thakur Prasad Gyawaly, Former Inspector General of Nepal Police
- Ram Kumar Gyawali, a Nepalese politician
