= Argali, Palpa =

Argali अर्गली गाविस
- Village
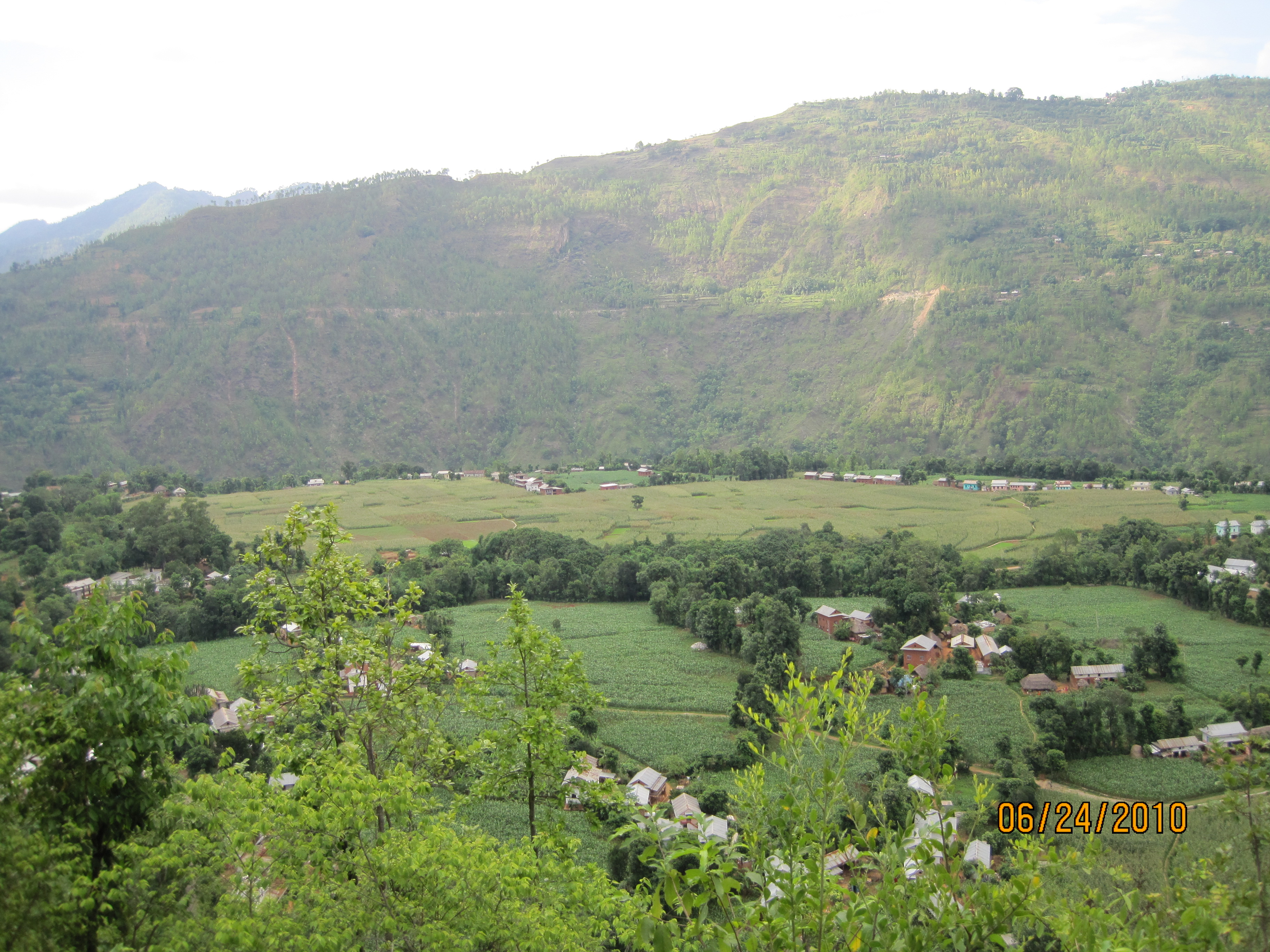
- Argali

- Location in Nepal
- Coordinates: 27.92°N 83.47°E
- Country: Nepal
- Province: Lumbini
- District: Palpa
- Municipality: Tansen

Population (1991)
  - Total: 2,729
- Time zone: UTC+5:45 (Nepal Time)

Argali is a village in Tansen municipality which is in Palpa District in southern Nepal. At the time of the 1991 Nepal census it had a population of 2729 people living in 511 individual households.

Argali is a plain area between the mountain where around more than 2000 people live. Khya village is in the west of Argali and Kalipar village in the west. Kaligandaki River flows near Argali. Historical Rana's palace is also there in Argali which have been turned to school now. Argali is a beautiful place where there is access of transportation, communication and electricity. The famous Rishikesh temple and Ridi Bazaar is only 5 km away from Argali.

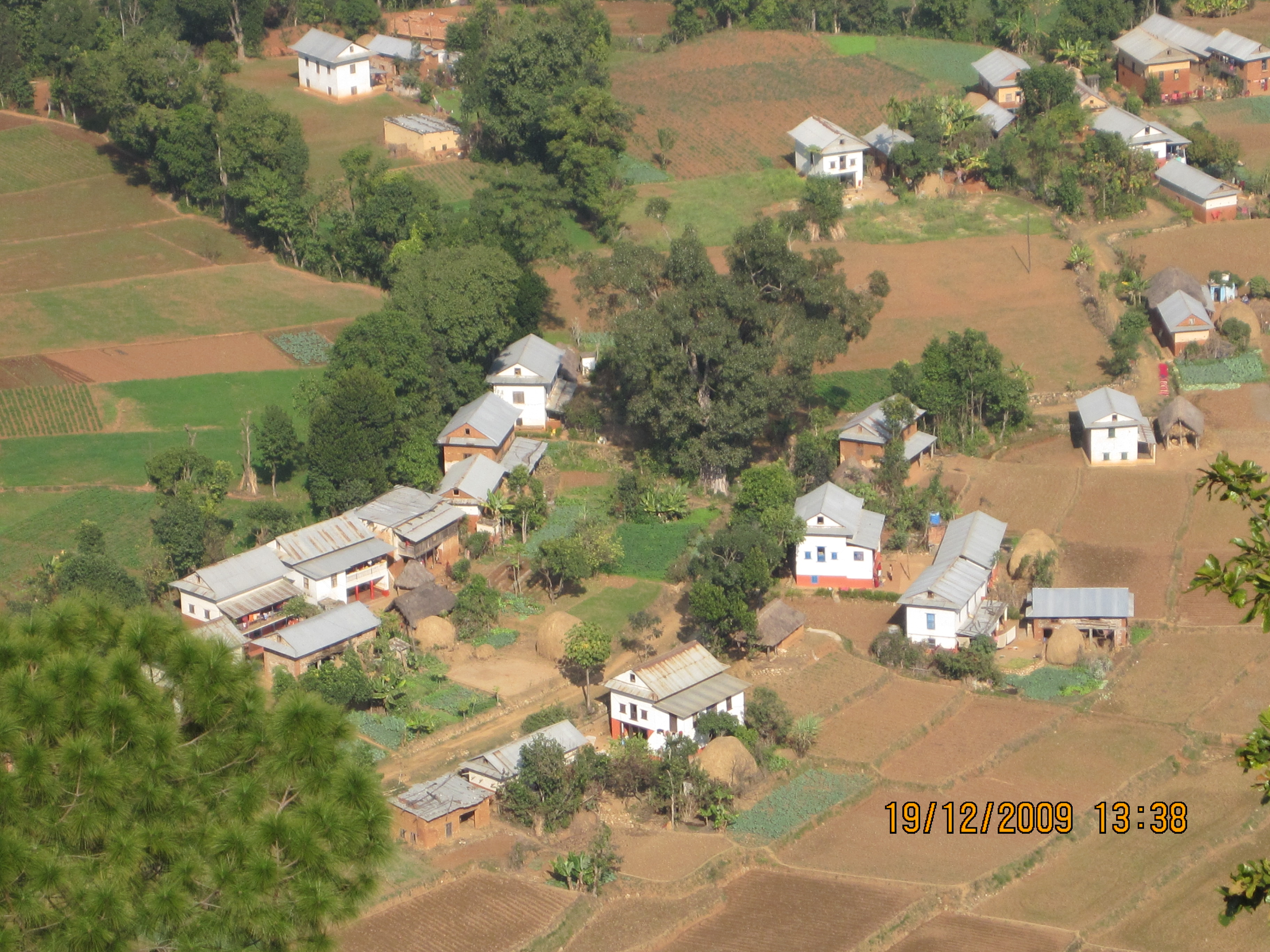
Argali, Palpa

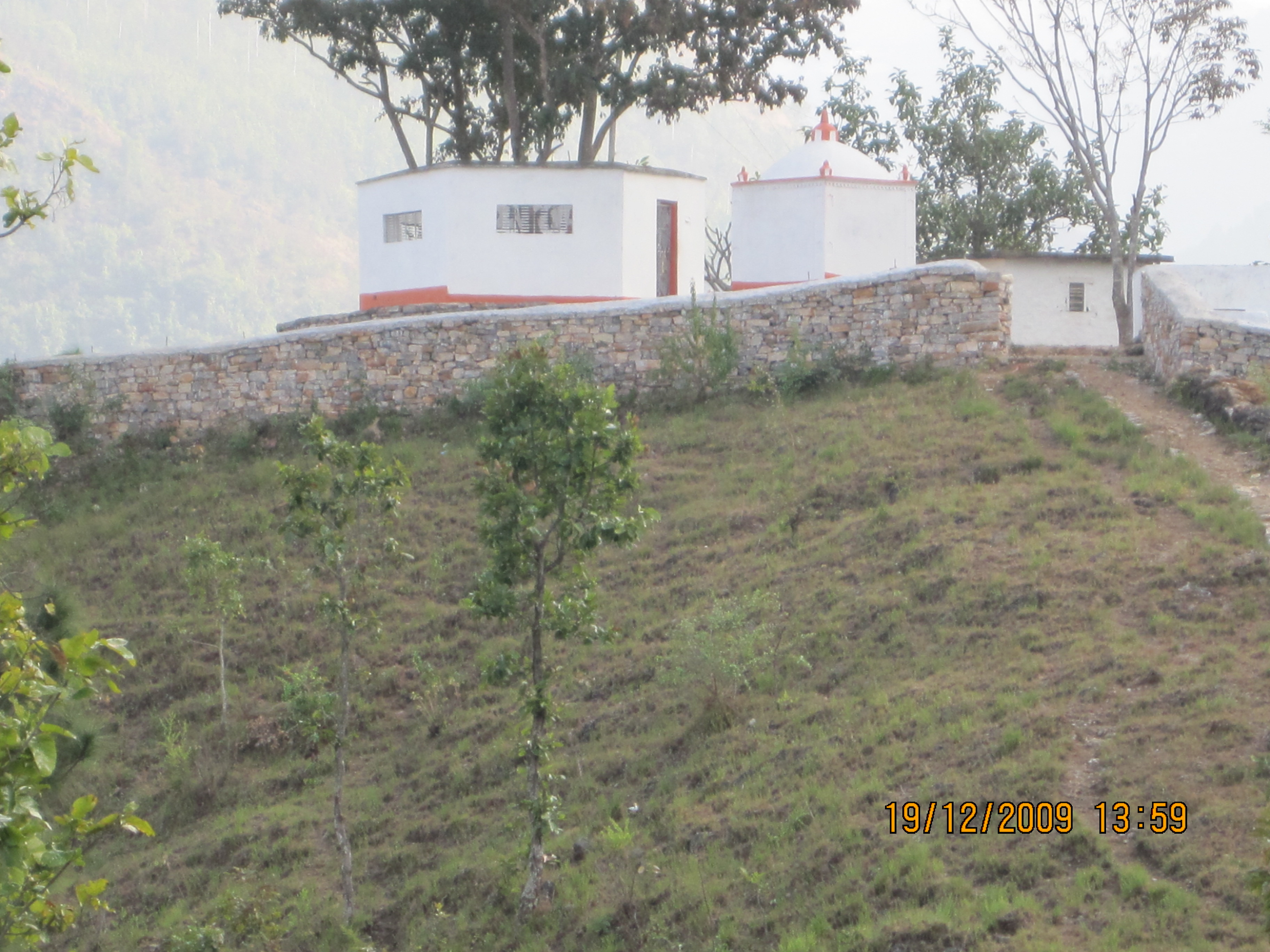
Siddababa Temple, Argali
