= Muktinath =

Hindu and Buddhist pilgrimage site in Mustang, Nepal

Muktinath Temple
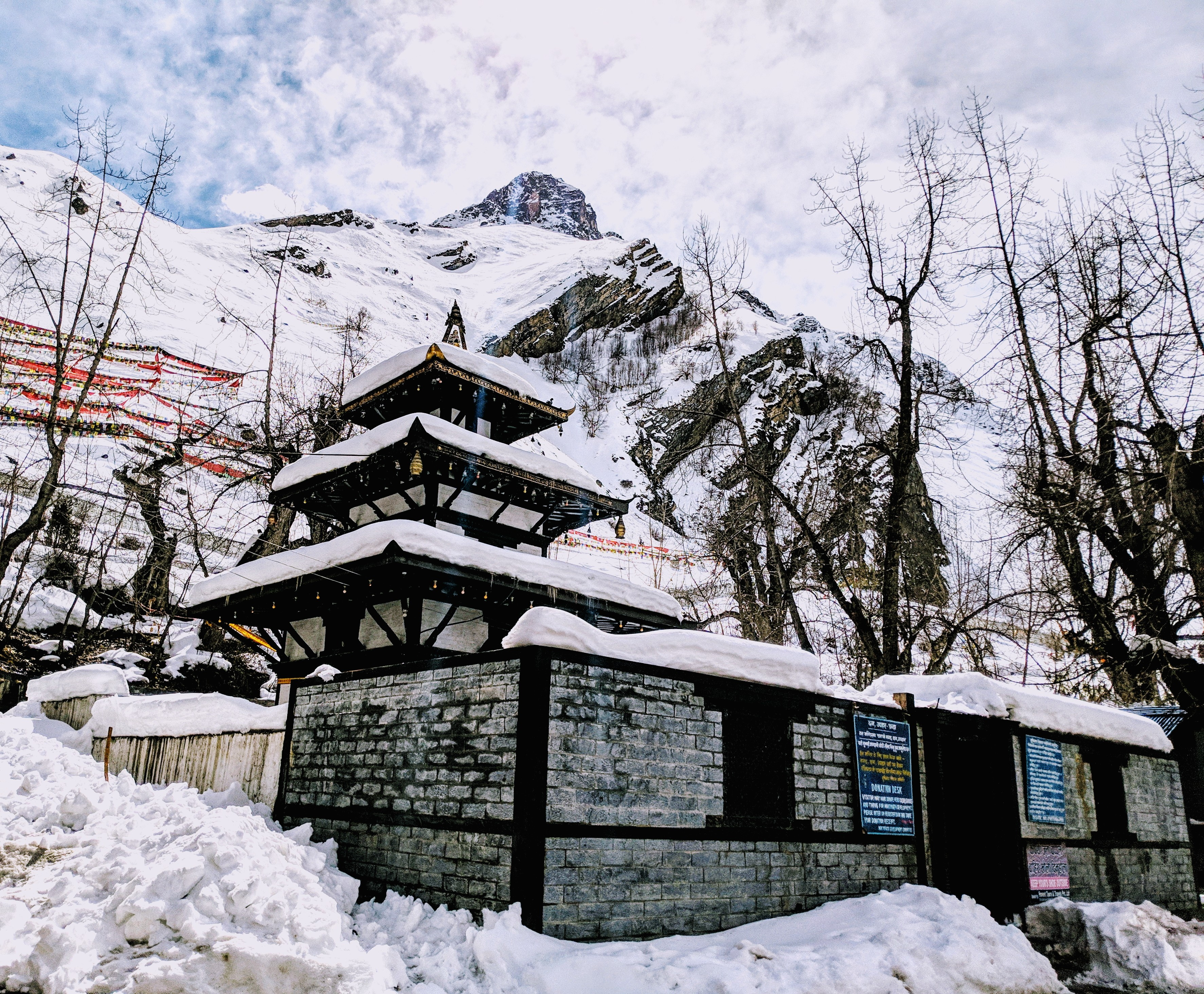
- The main temple of Muktinath ('lord of liberation') during winter months

- Location in Nepal

Religion
- Affiliation: Hinduism, Buddhism
- District: Mustang
- Province: Gandaki
- Deity: Vishnu (Srimurti Perumal, Muktinarayan, Muktinath) or Avalokiteshvara (Lokeshvar, Chenrezig), Shakti (Jwala Mai)
- Features: Tower: Kanaka Vimanam; Temple tank: Gandaki River or Chakra Tirtham

Location
- Location: Varagung Muktichhetra
- Country: Nepal
- Interactive map of Muktinath Temple
- Coordinates: 28°49′01.5″N 83°52′18.1″E

Architecture
- Type: Pagoda
- Style: Newari and Tibetan
- Elevation: 3,762 m (12,343 ft)

Muktinath (Nepali: मुक्तिनाथ) is an ancient religious complex located in Mustang, Nepal, primarily associated with the cult of Vishnu. The temple of Muktinath, known as 'the lord of salvation' (mukti), is sacred to both Hindus and Buddhists whom they worship as an abode of Hindu deities Vishnu and Shakti, and Buddhist bodhisattva Avalokiteśvara respectively. Located in the Muktinath valley at the foot of the Thorong La mountain pass, it is one of the world's highest temples at an altitude of 3,800 meters.

Muktinath is a shrine site. Although the surrounding valley and rural municipality (gaunpalika) bear its name, there are no human settlements called Muktinath. The place sits close to the village of Jharkot, overlooking it. Along the path between this village and the shrine lies the ancient hamlet of Ranipauwa, which nowadays forms a true village of Muktinath.

Char Dham, Nepal

For Buddhists, Muktinath is an abode of dakinis - goddesses known as Sky Dancers and is considered one of the twenty-four Tantric places. Tibetan Buddhists call it Chumig Gyatsa, which in Tibetan means "Hundred Waters" and the murti is revered as a manifestation of Avalokiteśvara, who embodies the compassion of all Buddhas.

For Hindus, the temple is associated with the worship of Vishnu or Shakti, deities which are considered to have self-manifested at the site. The temple complex is known as Mukti Kshetra, which literally means "the place of liberation (moksha)" and is one of the Char Dham in Nepal. Muktinath is given an eminent status in the Sri Vaishnavism faith, as one of the 108 Divya Desam, or 'holy land', as well as one of the eight most sacred shrines in that tradition, known as the Svayam Vyakta Ksetras or Sthalas. In Shaktism, as well for non-denominational Hindus, it is also one of the 51 Shakta pithas, associated with the head of goddess Sati.

Muktinath is mentioned in ancient Hindu Vishnu Purana's Gandaki Mahatmya.

== Architecture ==
Muktinath is a religious complex located within a poplar (Populus ciliata) woodland considered to be a sacred grove. According to tradition, these trees originated from the staves of the eighty-four siddhas who traveled to Tibet. The site comprises several sanctuaries: some are shared by Hindus and Buddhists, whereas others are almost exclusively visited by worshippers of either faith, while a few are rooted in ancient forms of animistic cults (snake worship).

=== Muktinarayan-Lokeshwar temple ===
The central shrine of Muktinath, dedicated to Muktinarayan-Srimurti Perumal or Lokeshwar-Chenrezig, was built in its current form between the 18th and 19th centuries. Its construction is ascribed to 1814 or 1815 and credited to Queen Subarna Prabha Devi of Nepal, who is said to have undertaken a pilgrimage to Muktinath around 1807. Erected in the traditional Newari architectural style, the shrine is surmounted by a three-tiered roof and crowned with a golden brass pinnacle. According to local tradition, the pagoda stands on the site of an earlier clay temple built by the kings of Jumla. Its prakaram, or courtyard, is enclosed by a series of 108 fountain spouts known as the Mukti Dharas, made of copper or brass, and taking the shape of a bull's head, or gaumukh. The temple façade is fronted by two ponds, or pushkarini, namely the Lakshmi Kunda and the Sarasvati Kunda.

The murti, or sacred cult image enshrined in the temple, is made of copper and has been dated to the late 16th or early 17th century. Measuring about one meter in height, the four-armed deity is seated under the canopy of a multi-headed snake, flanked on both sides by his two consorts. A Garuda lies beside him. It is revered in different ways according to the religious and cultural background of the devotees. For Nepalese and North Indian Hindus, it is conceived as Vishnu accompanied by Lakshmi and Sarasvati. In contrast, South Indian Hindus view the icon as Vishnu with Sridevi (Lakshmi) and Bhumadevi (Bhumi), whereas Tibetan Buddhists consider it to be Avalokiteshvara surrounded by two Dakinis.

== Religious significance ==
=== Hinduism ===
==== Vaishnavism ====
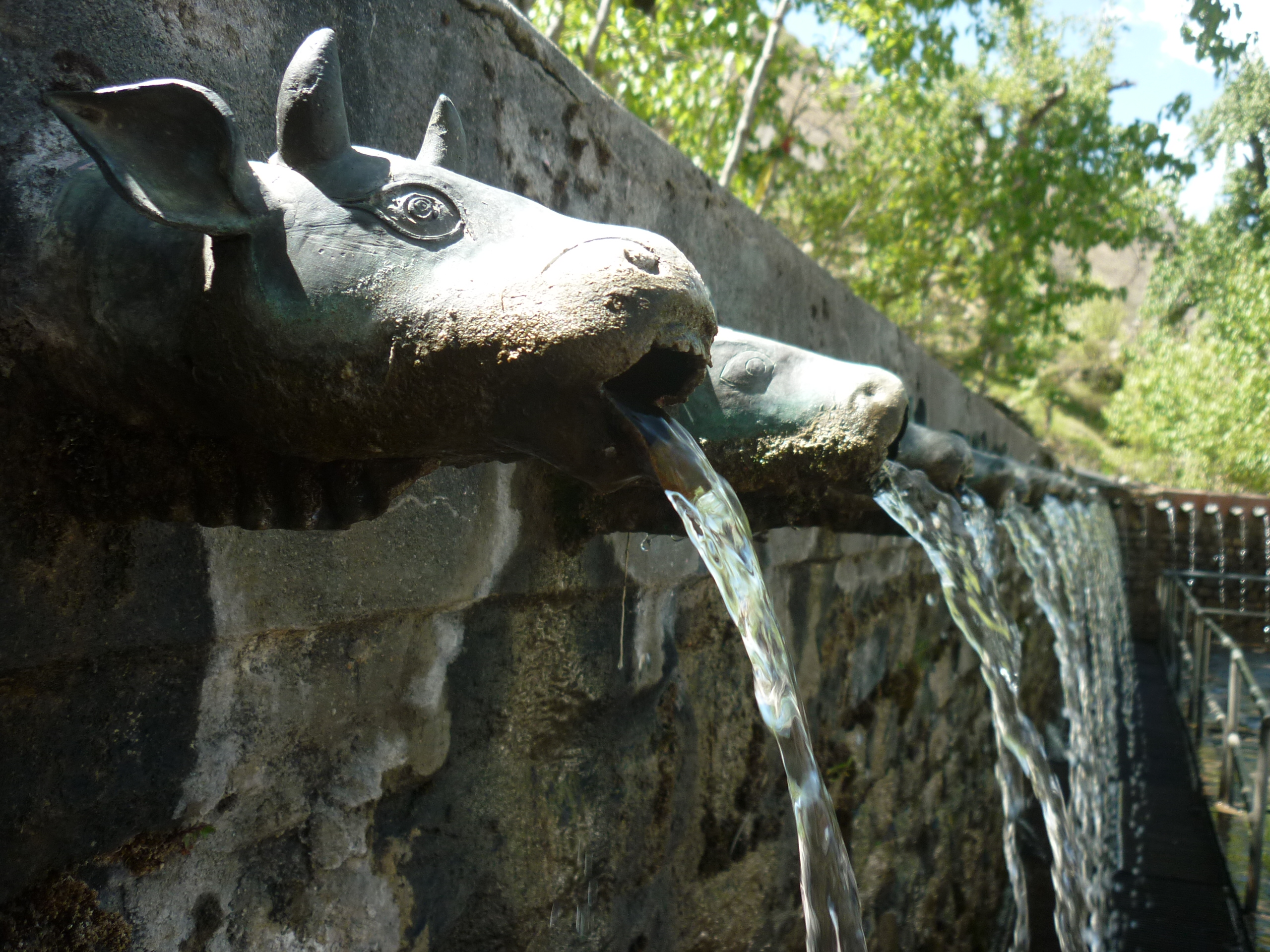
108 mukti dharas, or the water spouts of liberation

Muktinath is sacred to the Sri Vaishnava tradition, whose ancient literature mentions it under the name of Tiru Sāḷakkirāmam (in Tamil : திருச்சாளக்கிராமம்), or Thiru Salagramam. The deities of Vishnu and his consorts, Sridevi and Bhudevi, are regarded by adherents as offering jivanmukti to devotees, offering the epithet Muktinath to Vishnu. It is praised by Thirumangai Alvar in the compilation of the Nalayira Divya Prabandham. The river Gandaki, flowing adjacent to the temple, is renowned for carrying a kind of stone called shaligrama. The different patterns of the stone are worshiped as different forms of Vishnu. The colour white is considered as Vasudeva, black as Vishnu, green as Narayana, blue as Krishna, golden yellow & reddish yellow as Narasimha and Vamana in yellow. The stones are found in various shapes with even shapes of the Panchajanya and the Sudarshana Chakra, the attributes of Vishnu. The temple is revered in Nalayira Divya Prabandham, the 7th–9th century Vaishnava canon, by Kulasekhara Alvar in one hymn. The temple is classified as a Divya Desam, one of the 108 Vishnu temples that are mentioned in the book. Many devotees have contributed to it, most prominently the Alvars. Thirumangai Alvar could not reach Muktinath, but sang 10 pasurams from the nearest place, in praise of the deity. Periyalvar sang in praise of Vishnu as "Salagramamudaiya Nambi" (in Tamil : சாளக்கிராமம் உடைய நம்பி ; meaning "Lord of Sāḷakkirāmam").

Muktinath is also deemed by the Sri Vaishnavites to be one of the eight shrines known as Svayamvyakta Kshetra. These are sites in which Vishnu is self-manifested through a non-anthropic medium (objects of worship known as Svayambhu). The others are Srirangam, Srimushnam, Tirupati, Naimisharanya, Thotadri, Pushkar, and Badrinath.

The springs encircling the shrine are believed to represent each of the 108 holy lands of the Sri Vaishnava Sampradaya. The water flowing from them is viewed as water from the pushkarini of these respective sanctuaries, including the celestial ones.

The titles found in Sri Vaishnava religious literature for the deities of Thiru Salagramam are Sri Murti Perumal (Vishnu) and Sri Devi Nachiyar (Lakshmi).

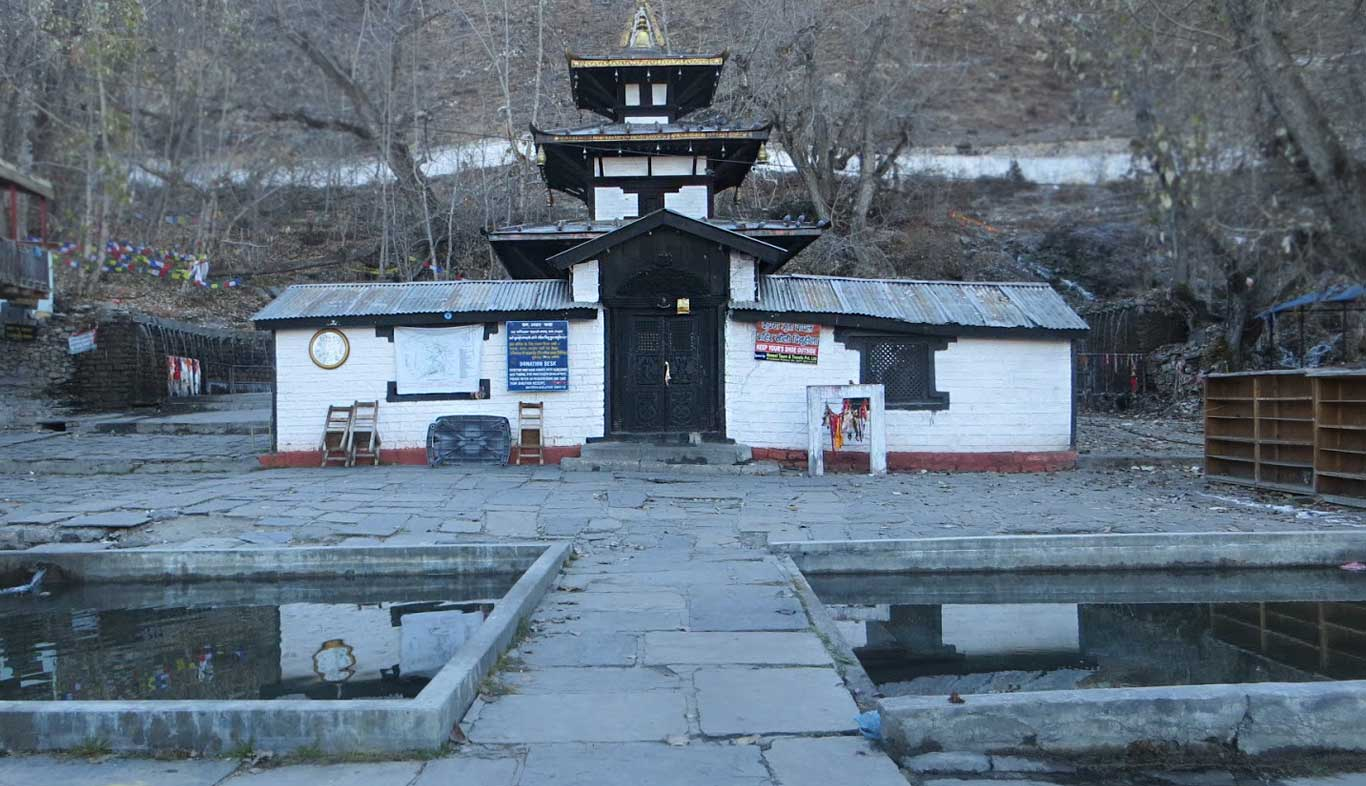
The Vishnu-Lokeshwar temple of Muktinath

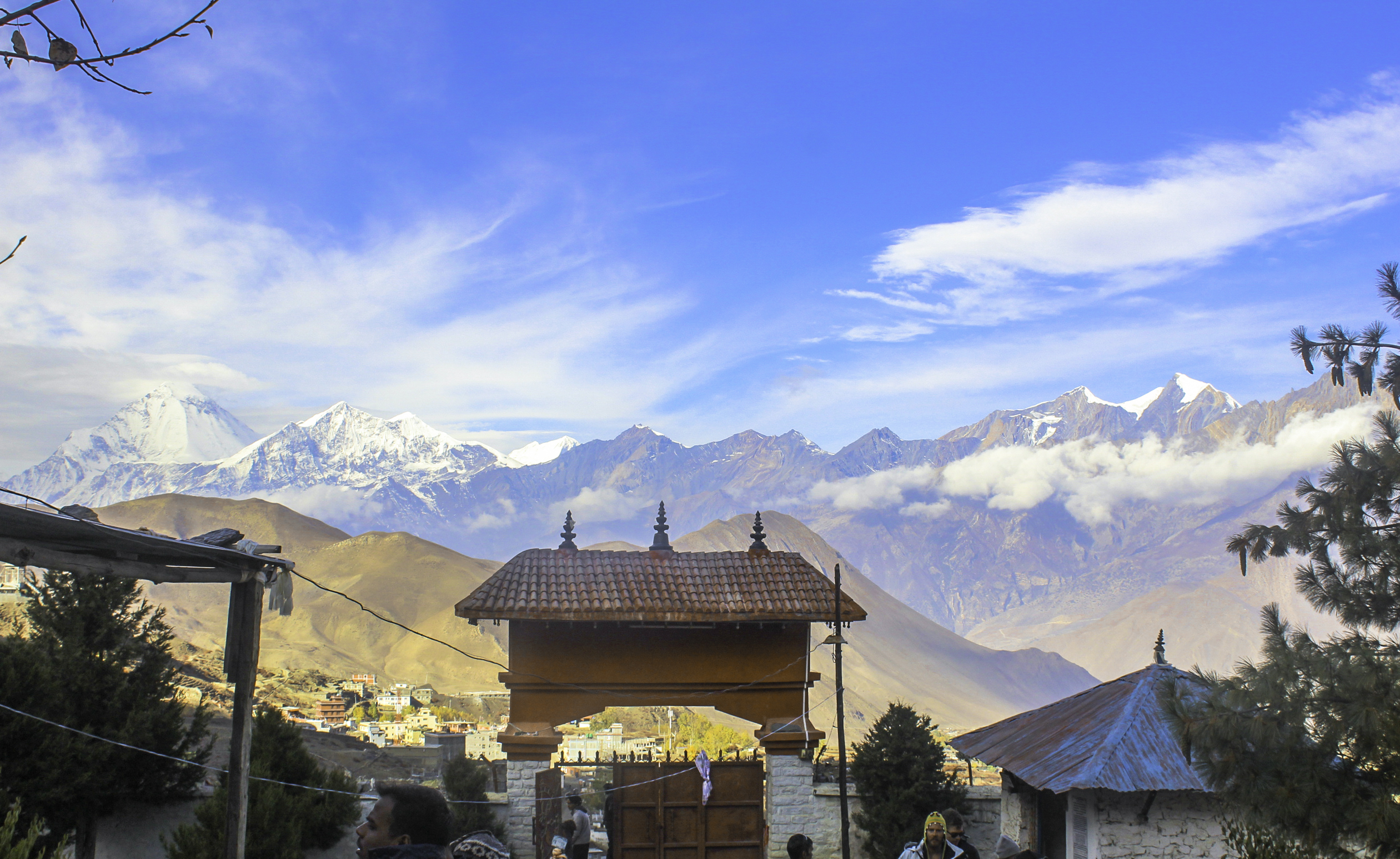
Gate of the Muktinath sanctuary facing the Dhaulagiri Range, in the Himalayas

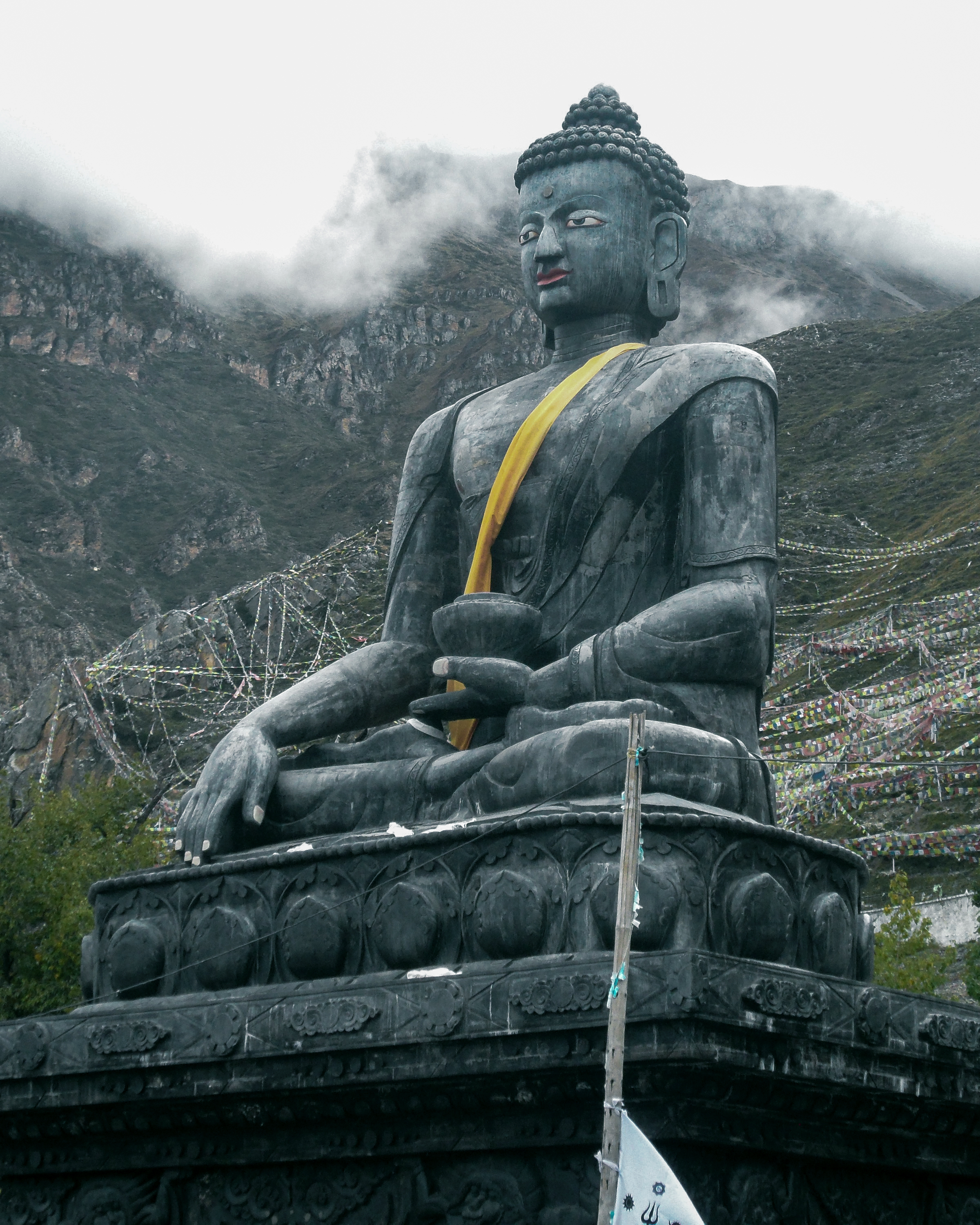
Buddha statue inside Muktinath area

==== Shaktism ====
Muktinath Temple is considered an important place of pilgrimage in Shaktism as one of the Shakta pithas associated with goddess Sati's head (face). The Shakti of Muktinath is addressed as "Gandaki Chandi", and the Bhairav (Shiva) as "Chakrapani".

Muktinath temple complex is also revered as a place on earth to host all five elements (fire, water, sky, earth, and air) from which all material things in the universe are made. The goddess Jwala Mai Temple situated adjacent to the Muktinath Temple is worshipped for its sacred flame fueled by natural gas emanating from the earth.

=== Buddhism ===
The temple has been worshipped by Buddhists as an abode of Avalokiteśvara, the Buddha who embodies the compassion of all Buddhas. In Tibetan Buddhism, the place is known as "Chumig Gyatsa" (the Hundred Springs) and is venerated as one of the important places related to Padmasambhava, the founder of Tibetan Buddhism and one of the 24 Tantric (sacred) places of Tibetan Buddhism. The area of the temple is worshipped as a residence of 21 Tara and many Dakinis, goddesses known as Sky Dancers.

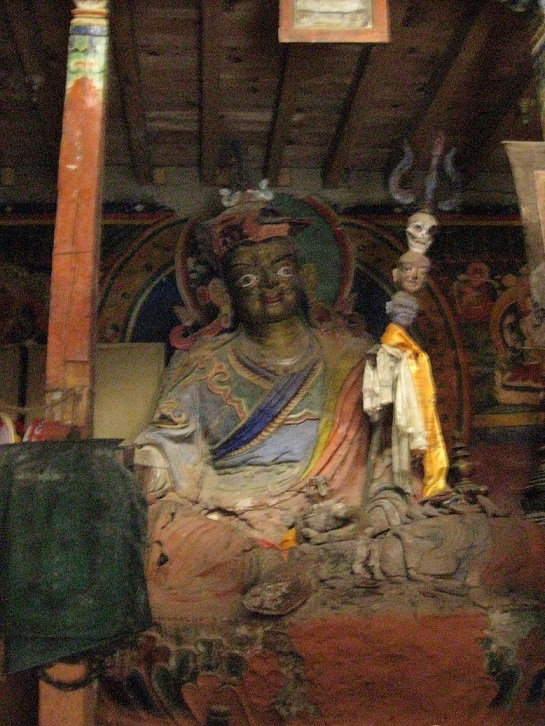
Statue of Guru Padmasambhava

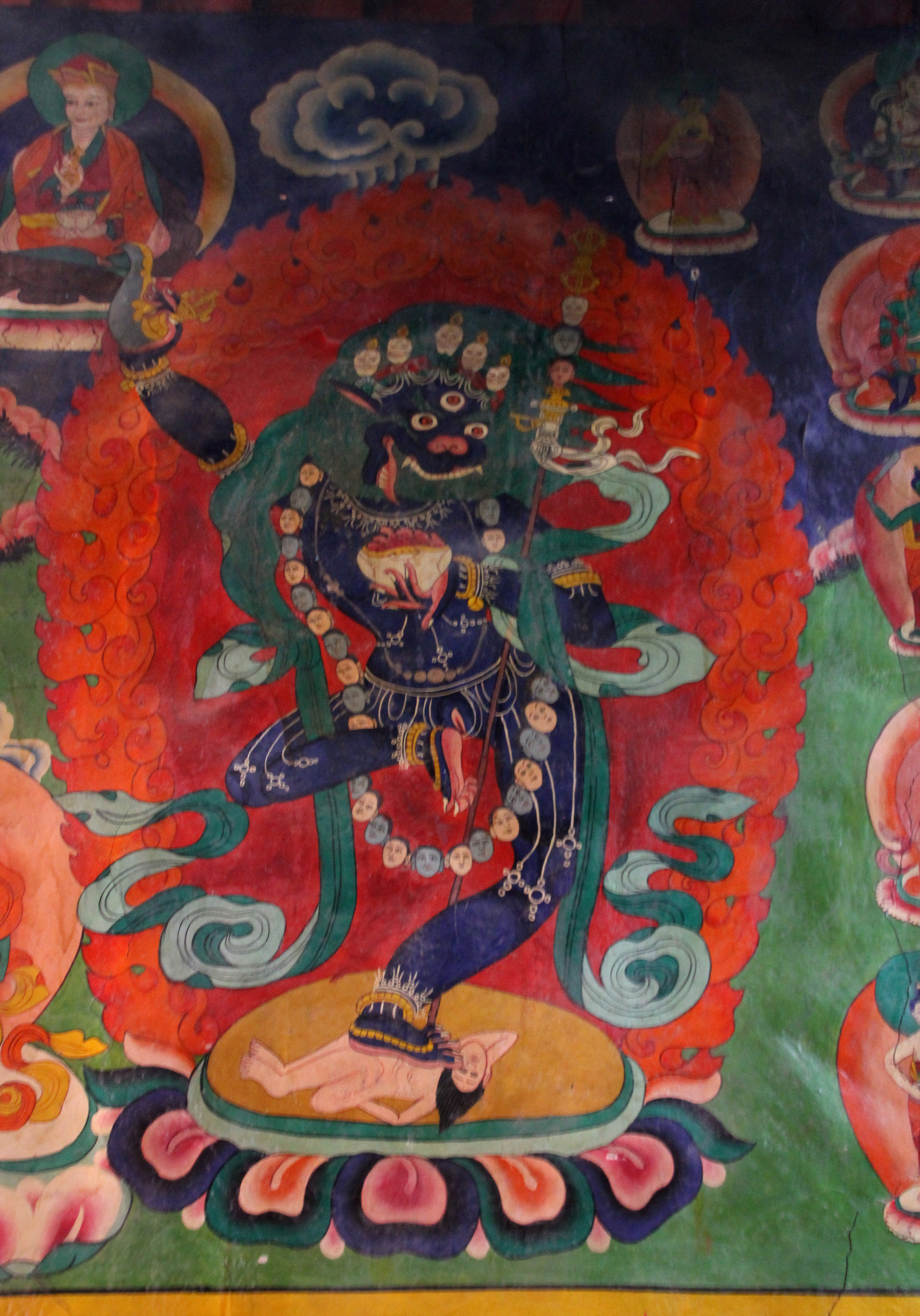
Buddhist Goddess in Muktinath temple complex

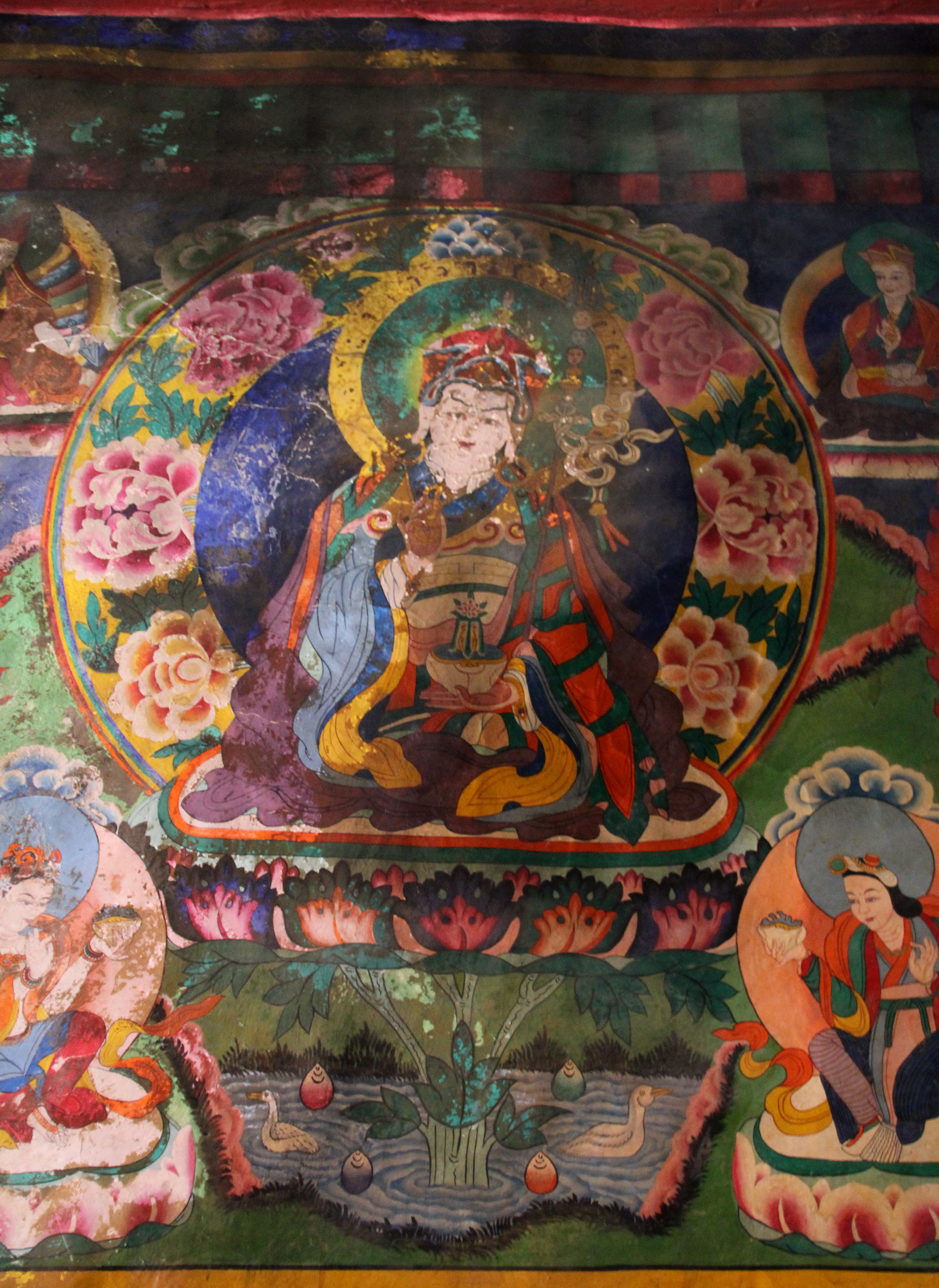
Buddhist thangka

The nuns of the temple complex are considered to be goddesses called Dakinis and to be the offsprings of the women who were taught by Padmasambhava during his stay in Muktinath. It is believed that Padmasambhava built a statue in his own image before departing from Muktinath to Tibet, which resides in the Mharme Lhakhang Gompa and is tended by these nuns.

== Gallery ==
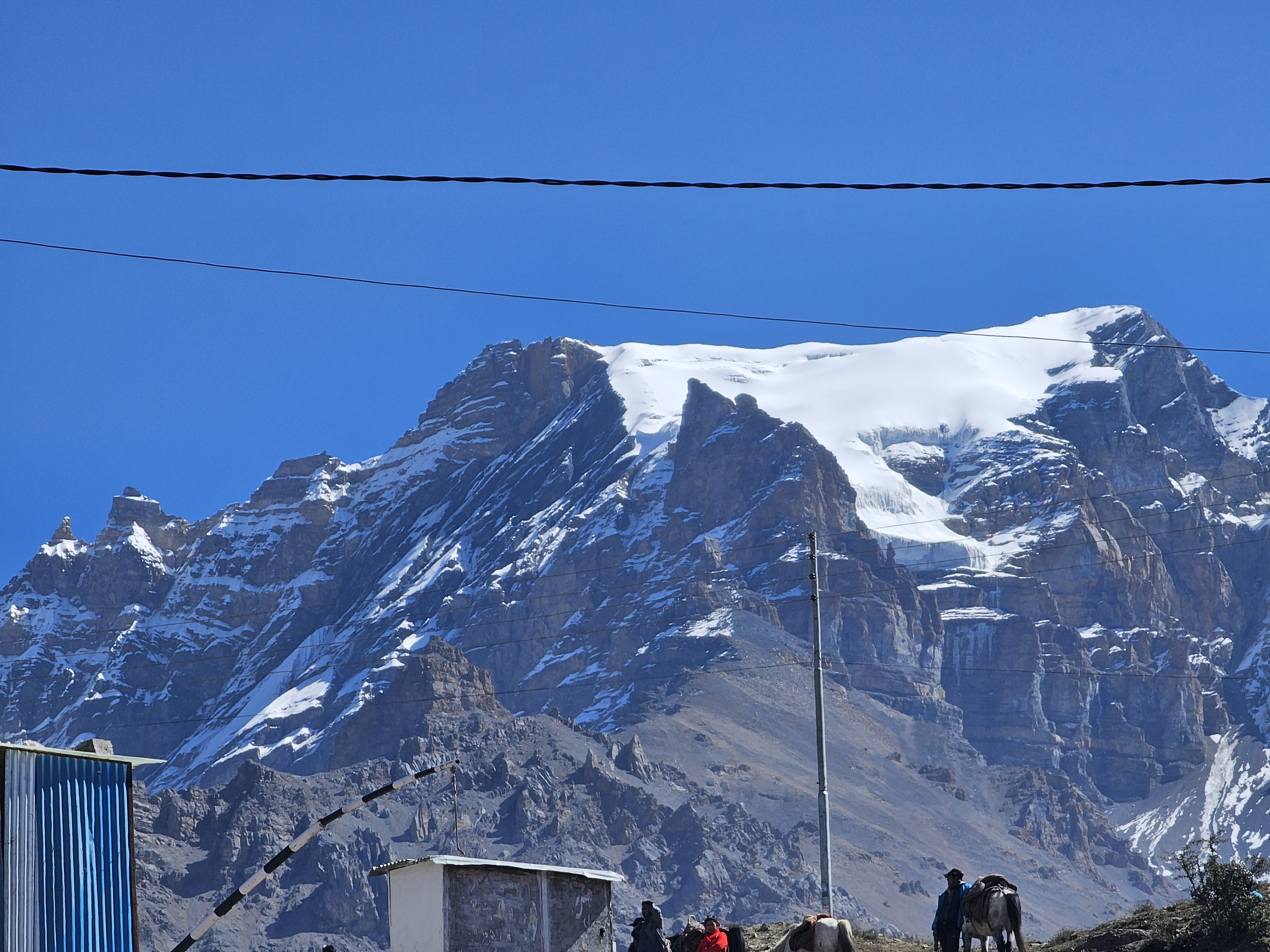
Himalayan near Muktinath, Mustang, Nepal

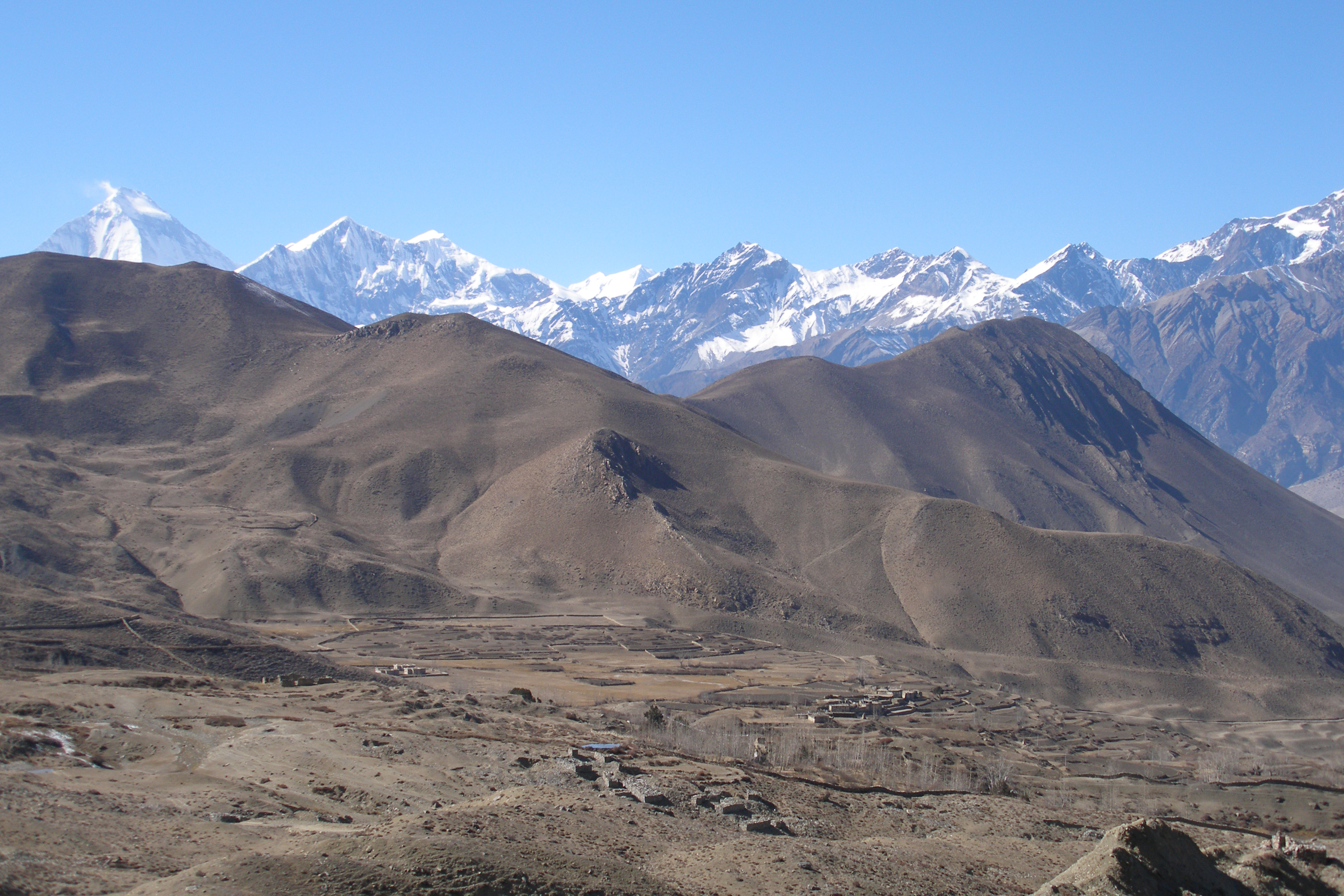
Muktinath valley

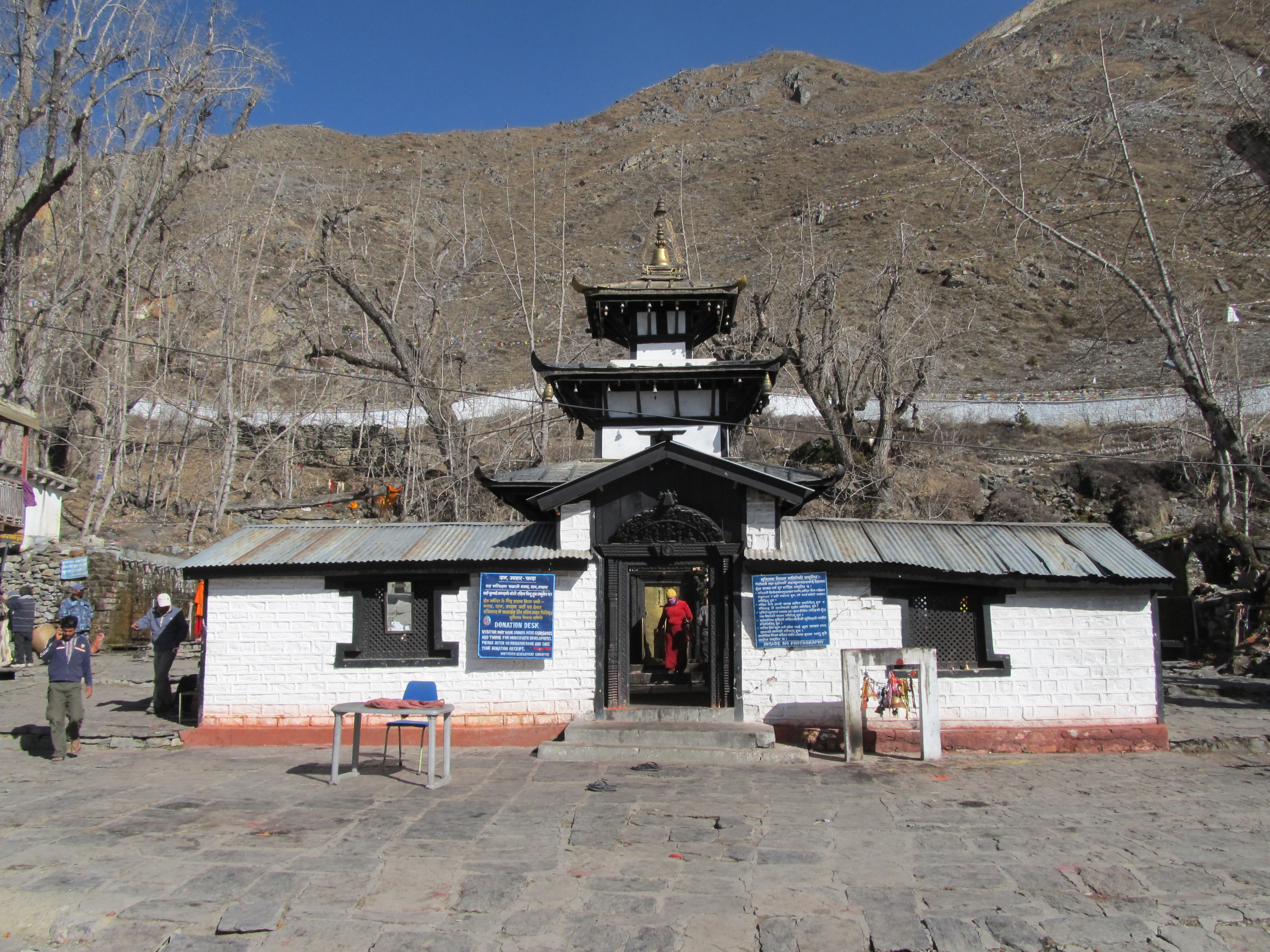
Muktinath Temple

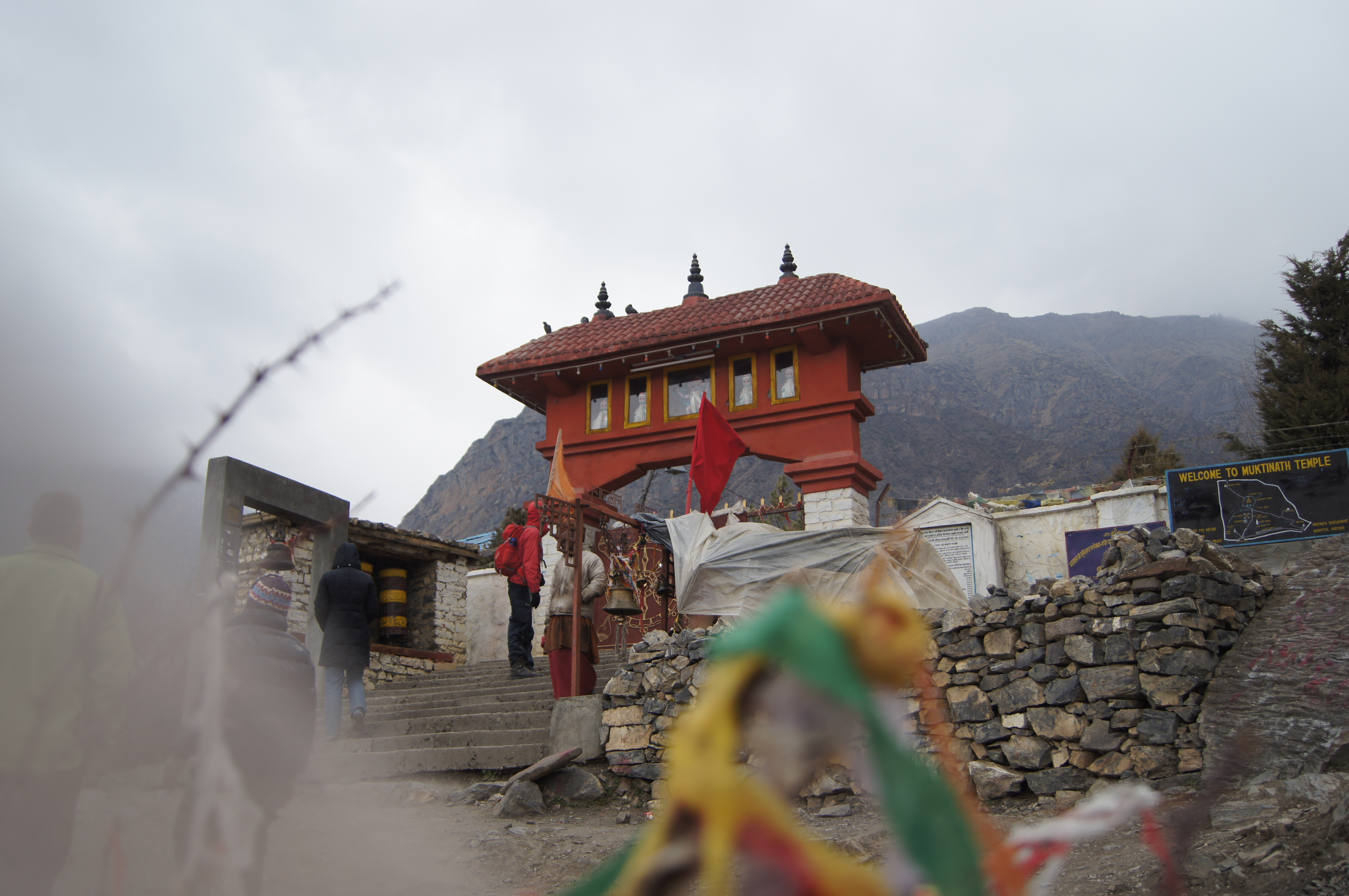
Entrance to the temple area

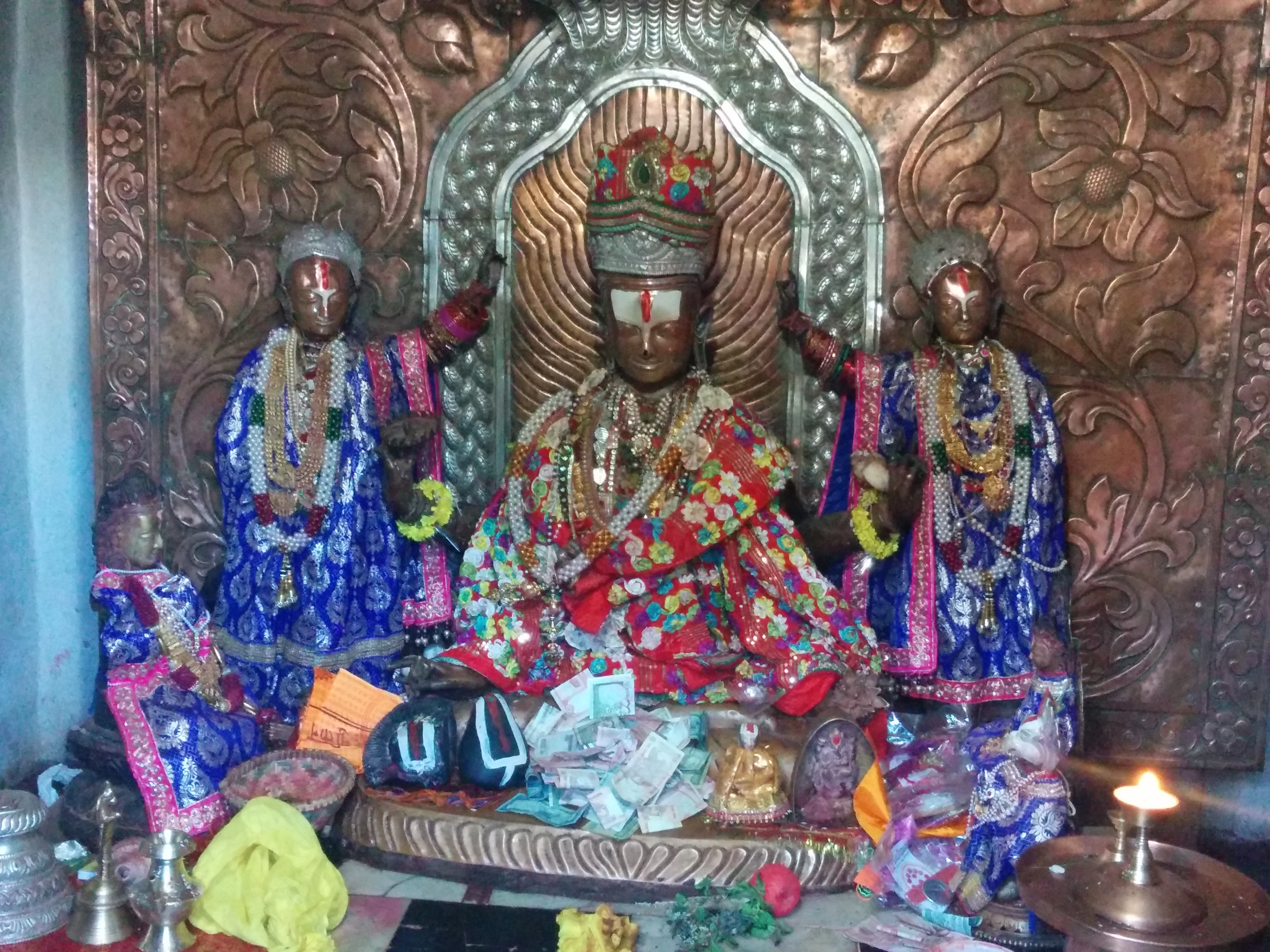
The Vishnu shrine inside Muktinath Temple

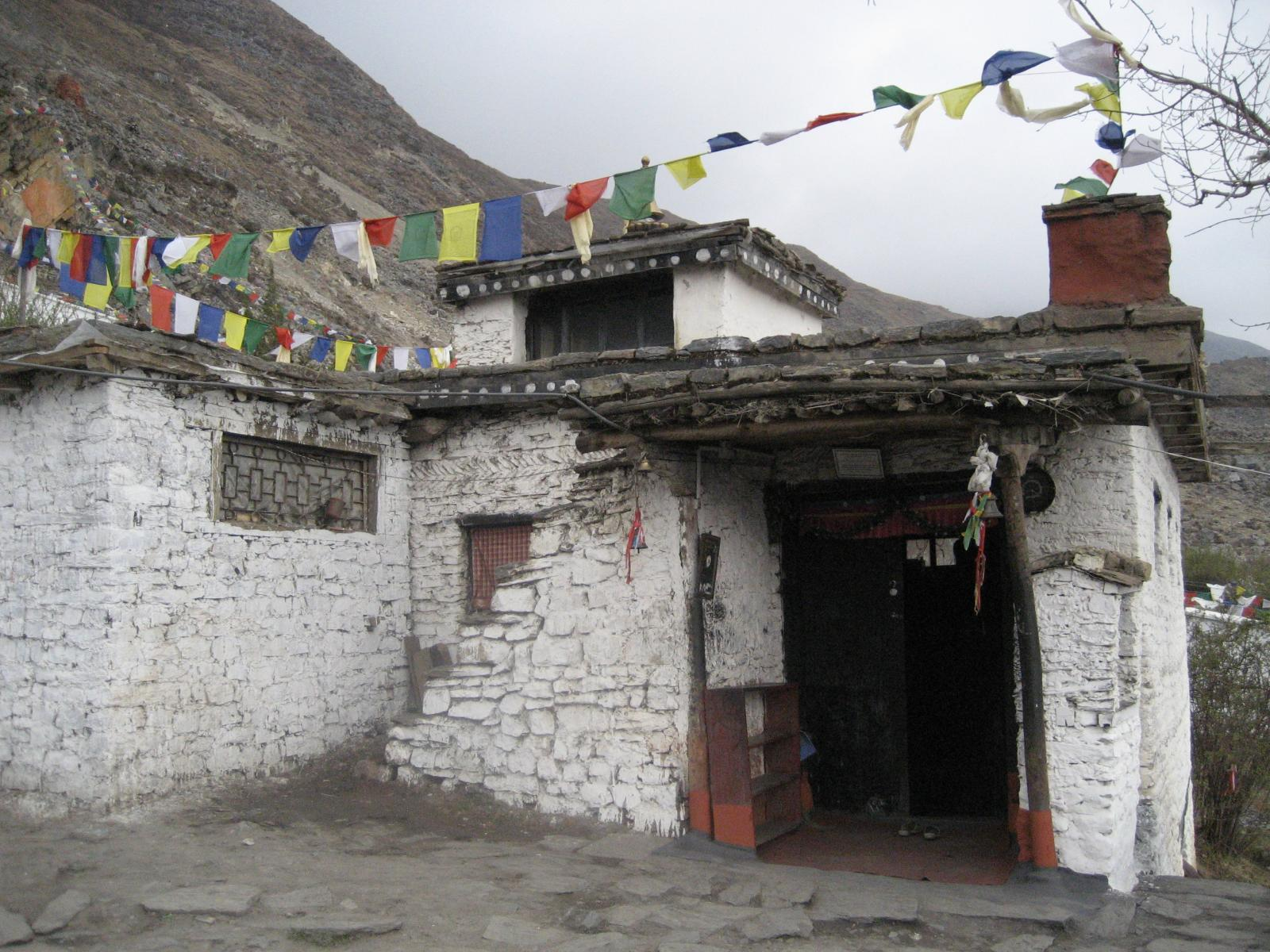
Goddess Jwala Mata Shakta pitha Temple

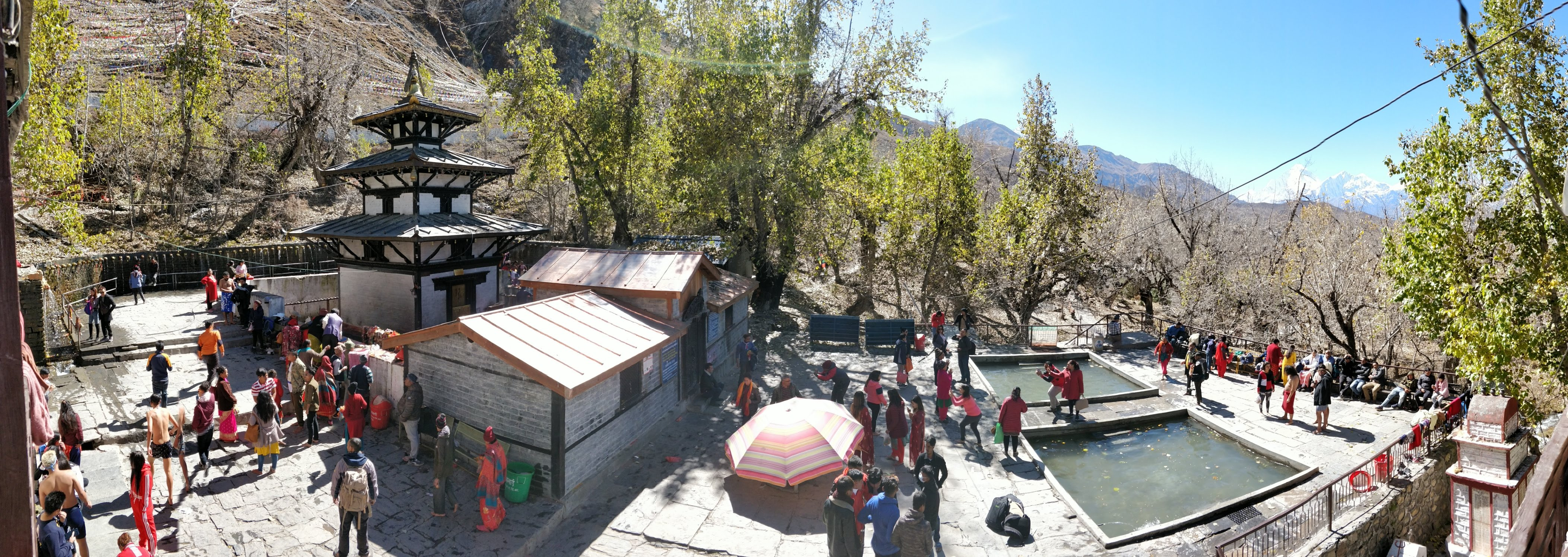
Muktinath Temple with 2 ponds (right) and 108 spouts (left)

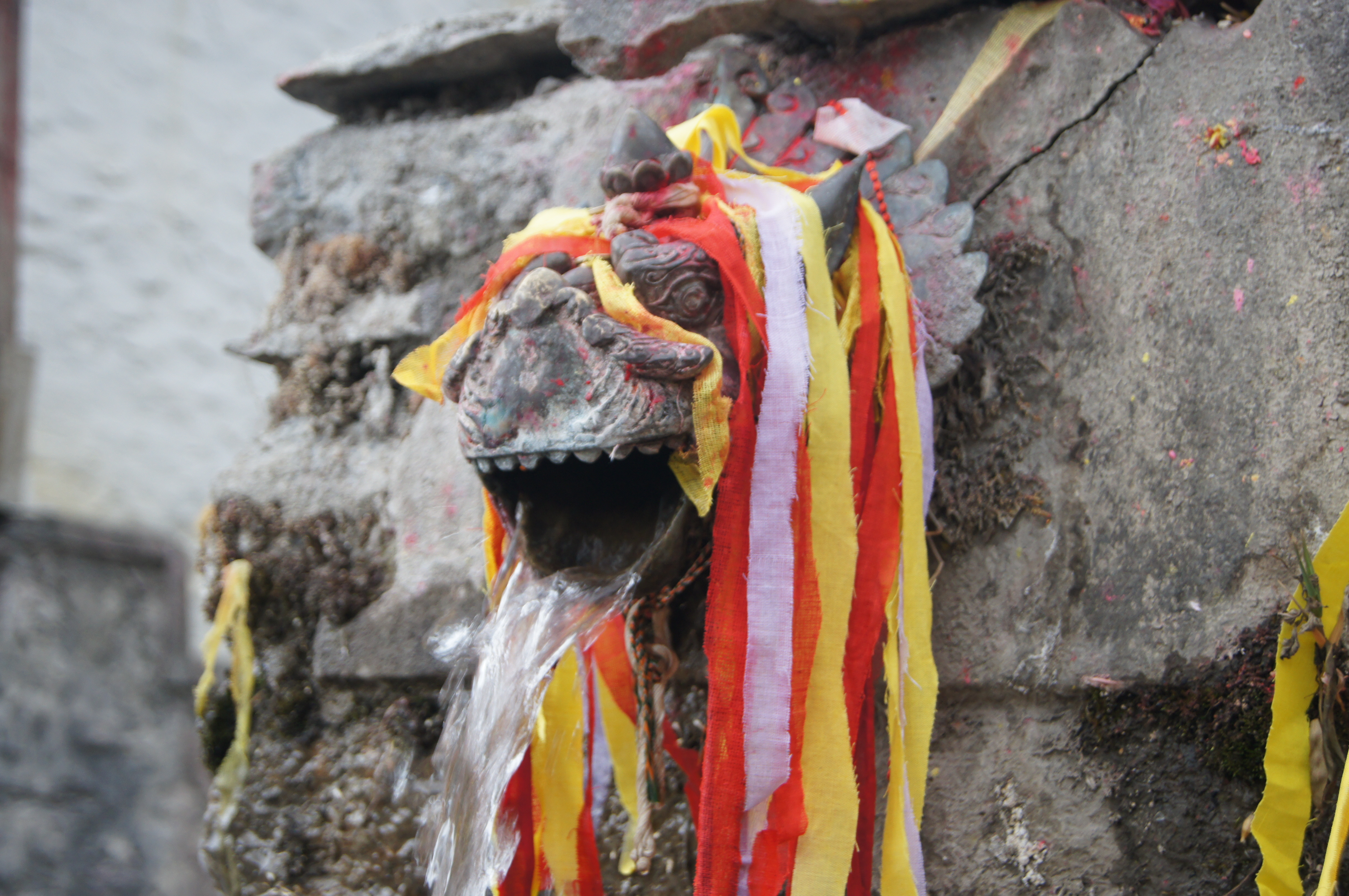
Close-up of one of the 108 holy spouts

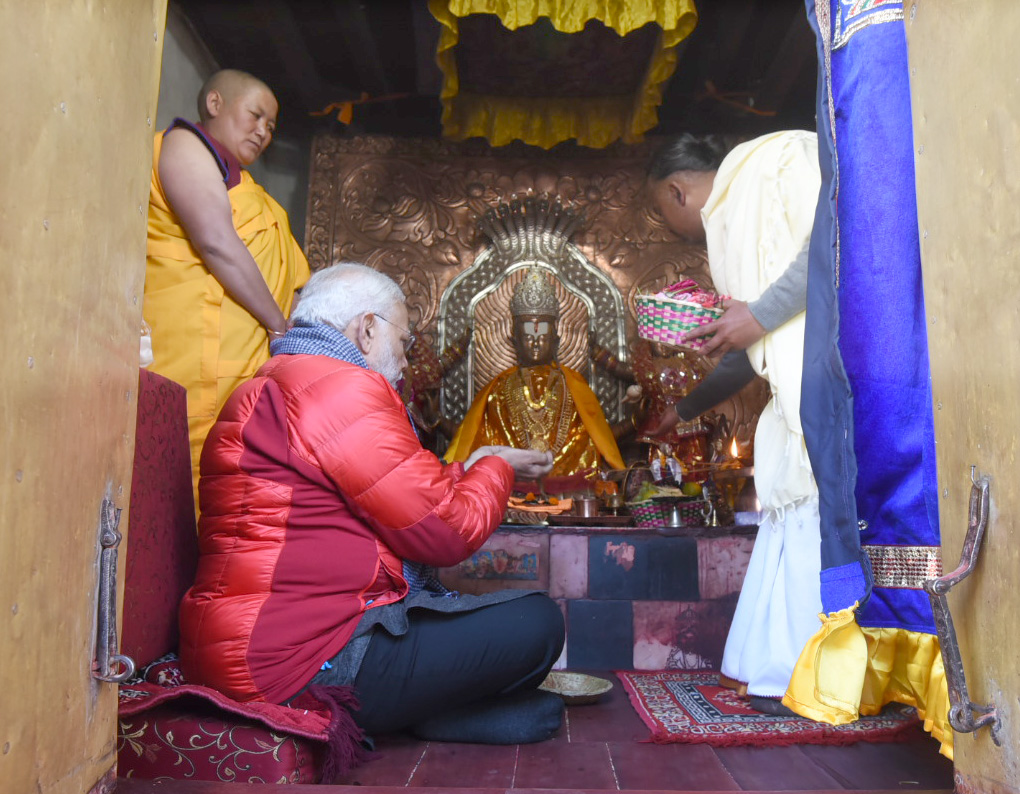
Narendra Modi, Prime Minister of India, offering prayers, assisted by both a Bhikkhuni and a Bahun.

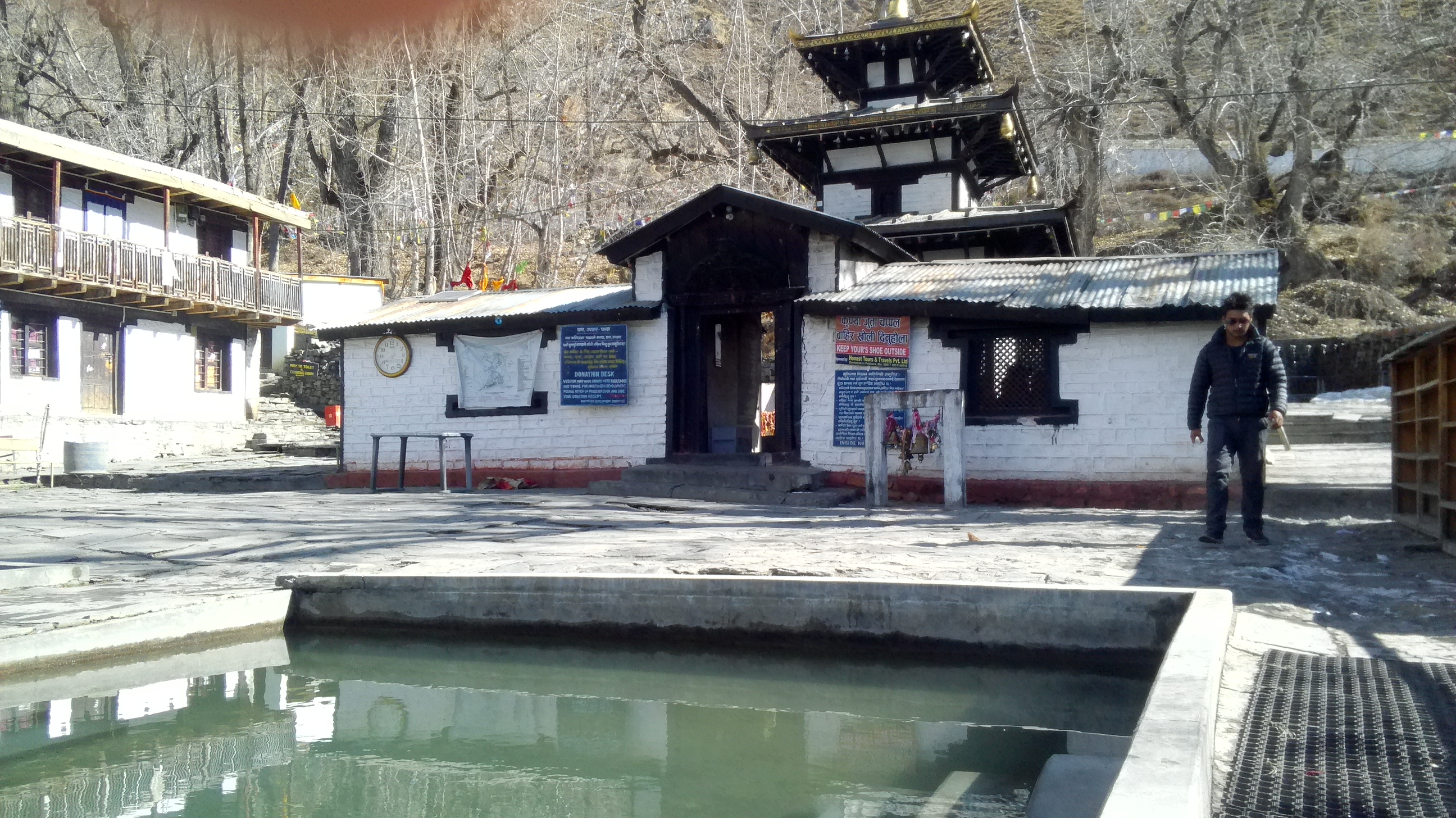
Temple and pond

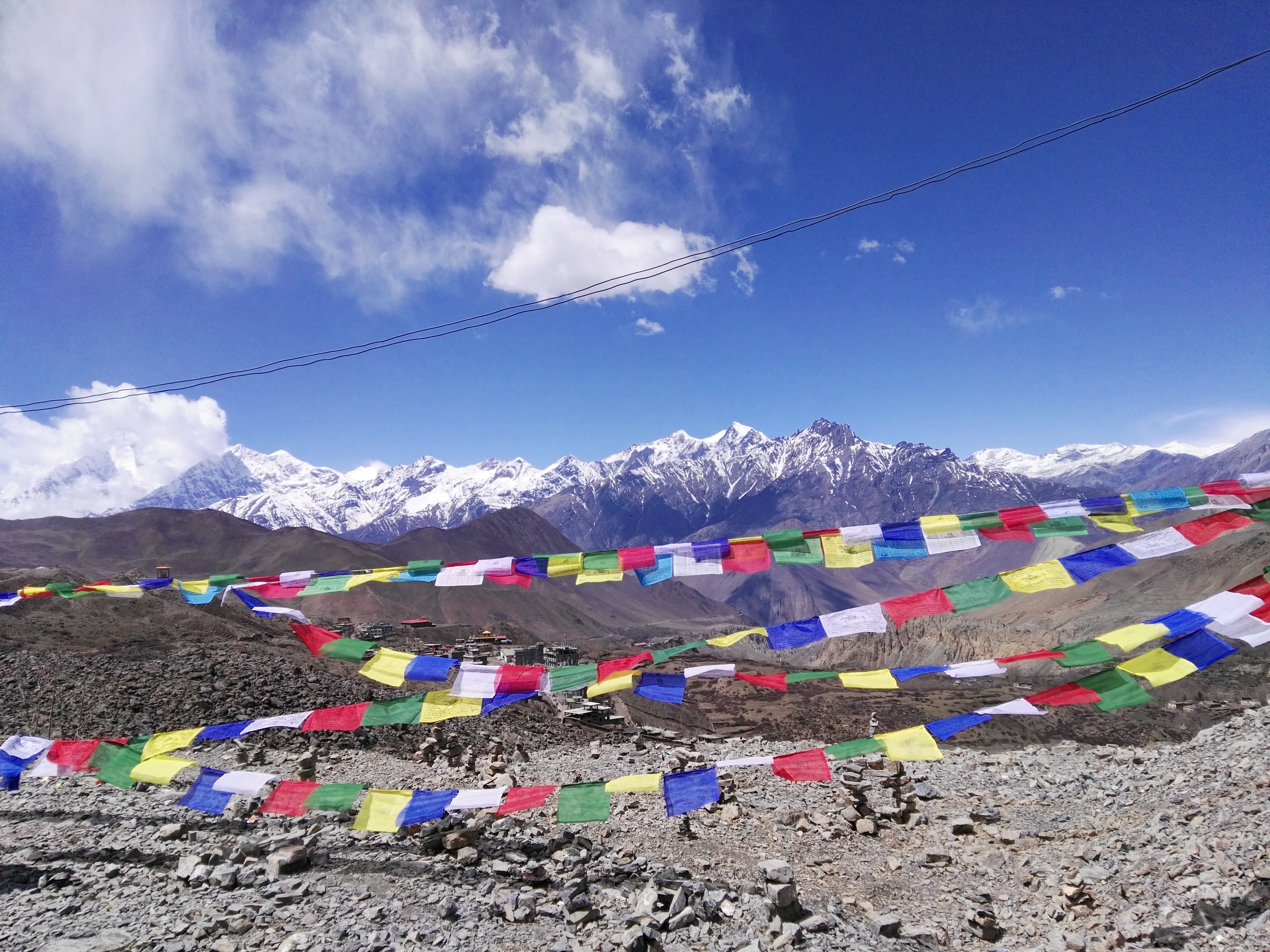
Prayer flags over Muktinath area

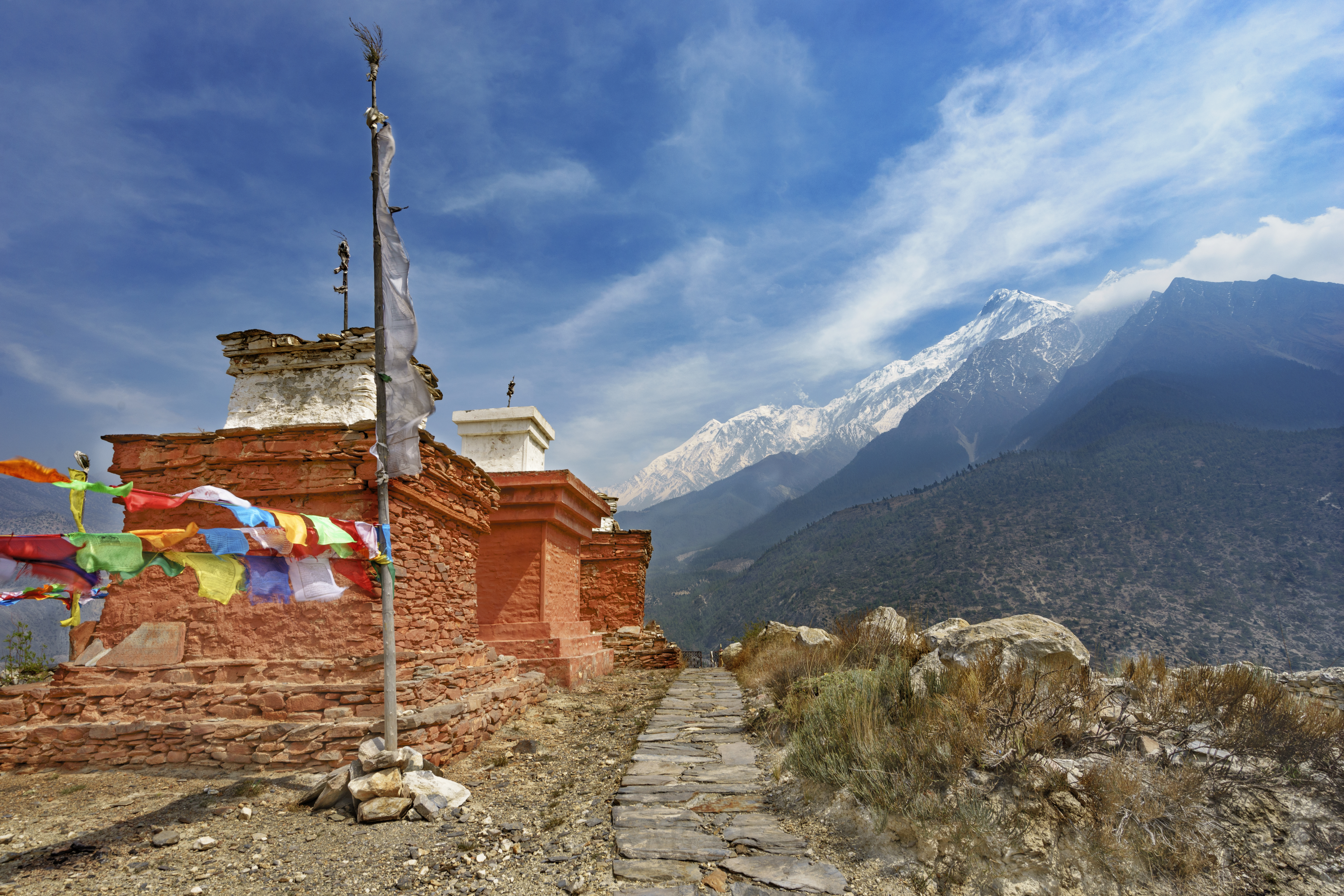
Gumba

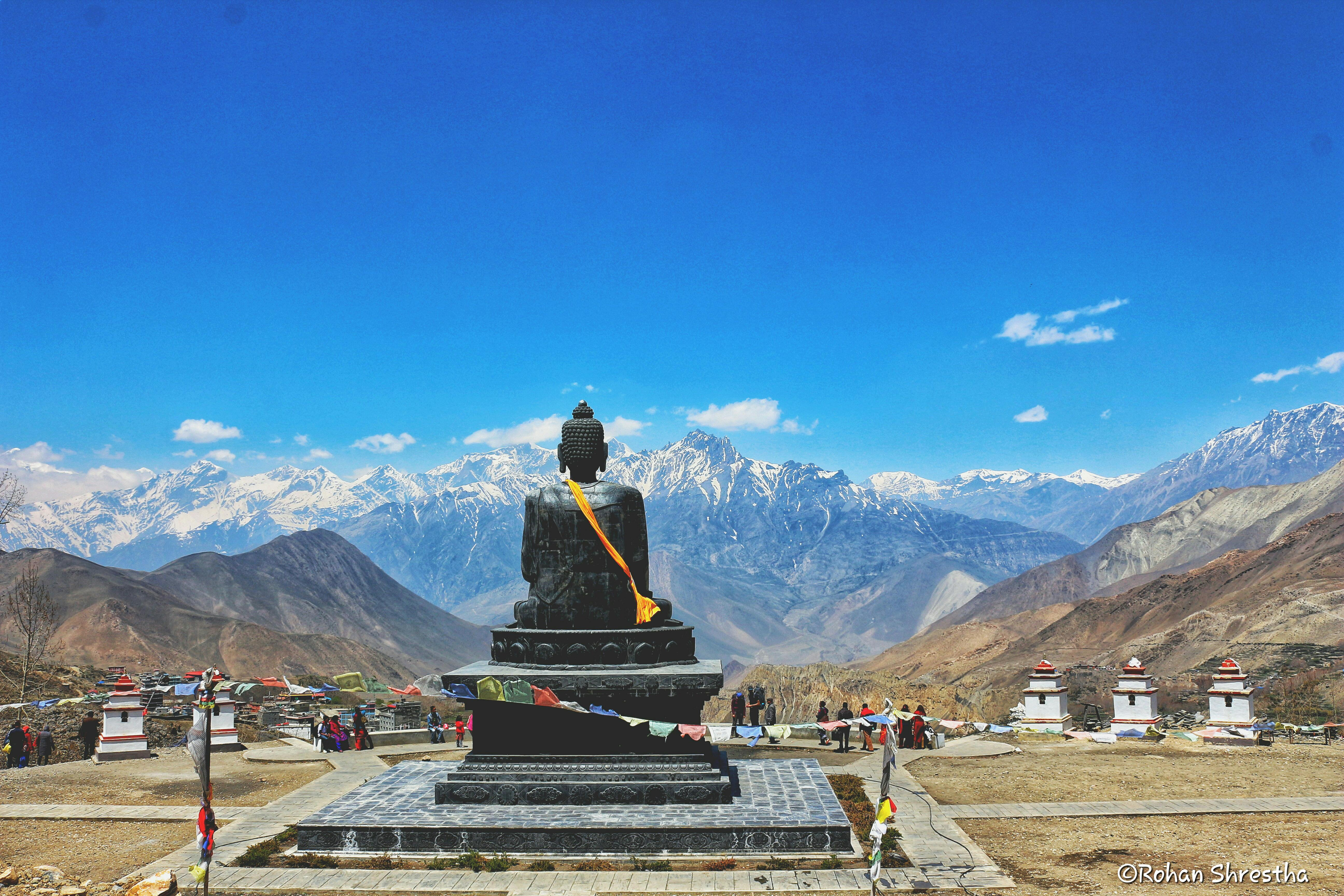
Buddha overlooking valley

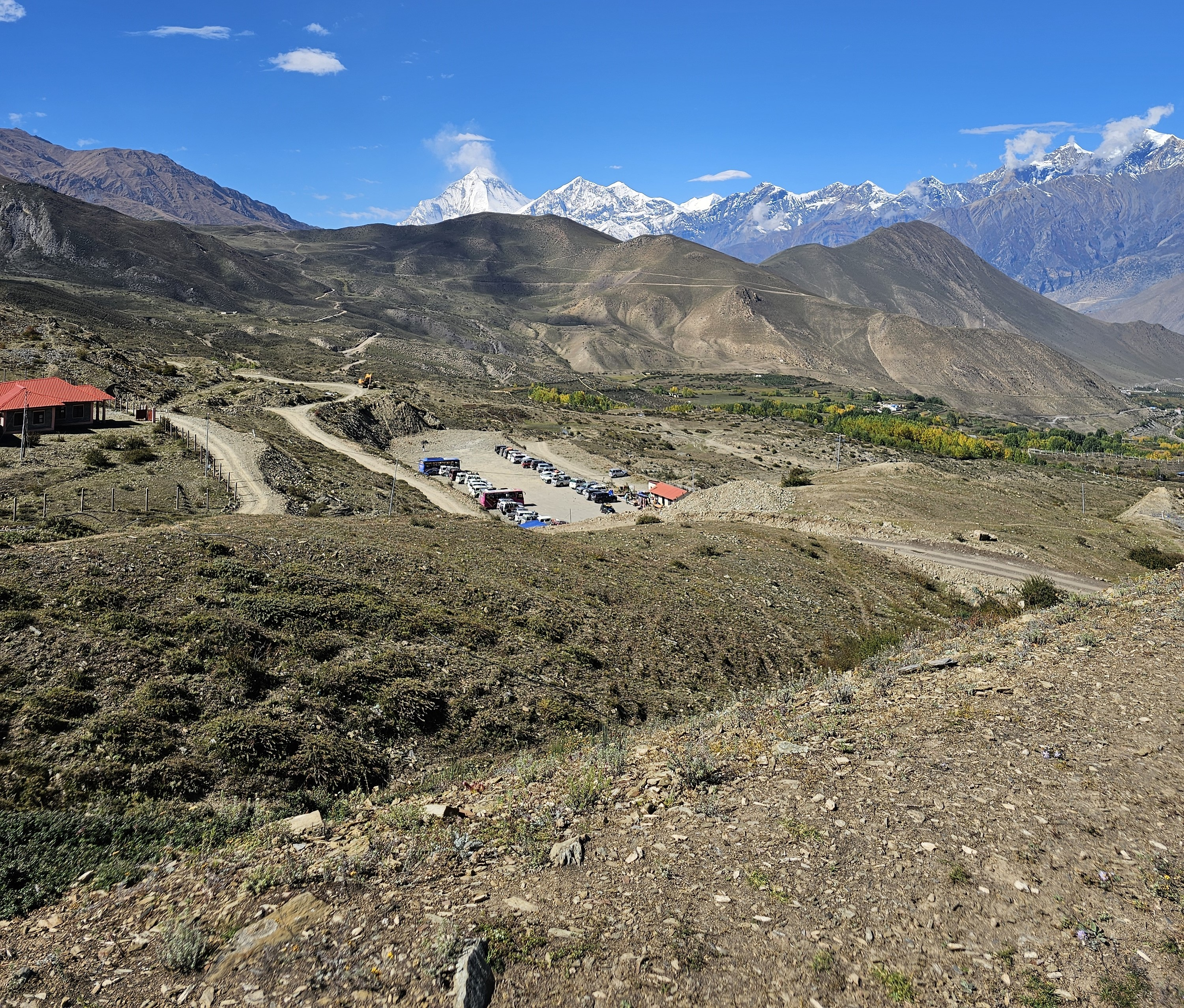
Muktinath bus stand
