= Jharkot =

Coordinates: 28.817851°N 83.849082°E

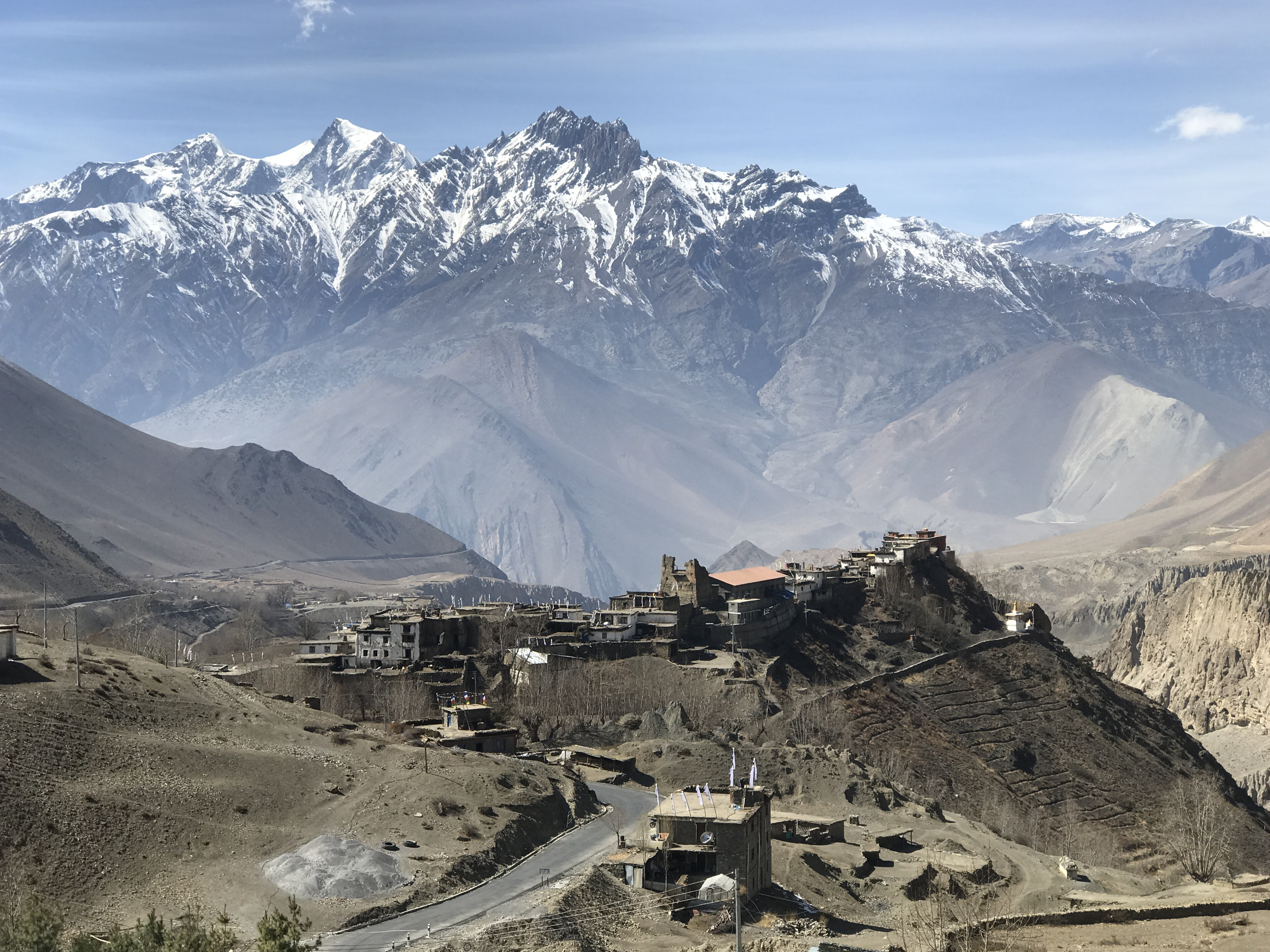
Jharkot

Jharkot or Dzarkot (झारकोट), locally Dzar, is a village in the Mustang District of the Gandaki Province (erstwhile Dhaulagiri Zone), located in central Nepal. It is situated at an elevation of 3519 m between Kagbeni, on the banks of the Kali Gandaki river, and the Hindu pilgrimage site of Muktinath, bellow the Thorung La.

== See also ==
- Bandipur
- Dhampus
