= Ruru Kshetra =

Hindu pilgrimage site in Nepal

Ruru Kshetra रूरू क्षेत्र
- Hindu Pilgrimage Site
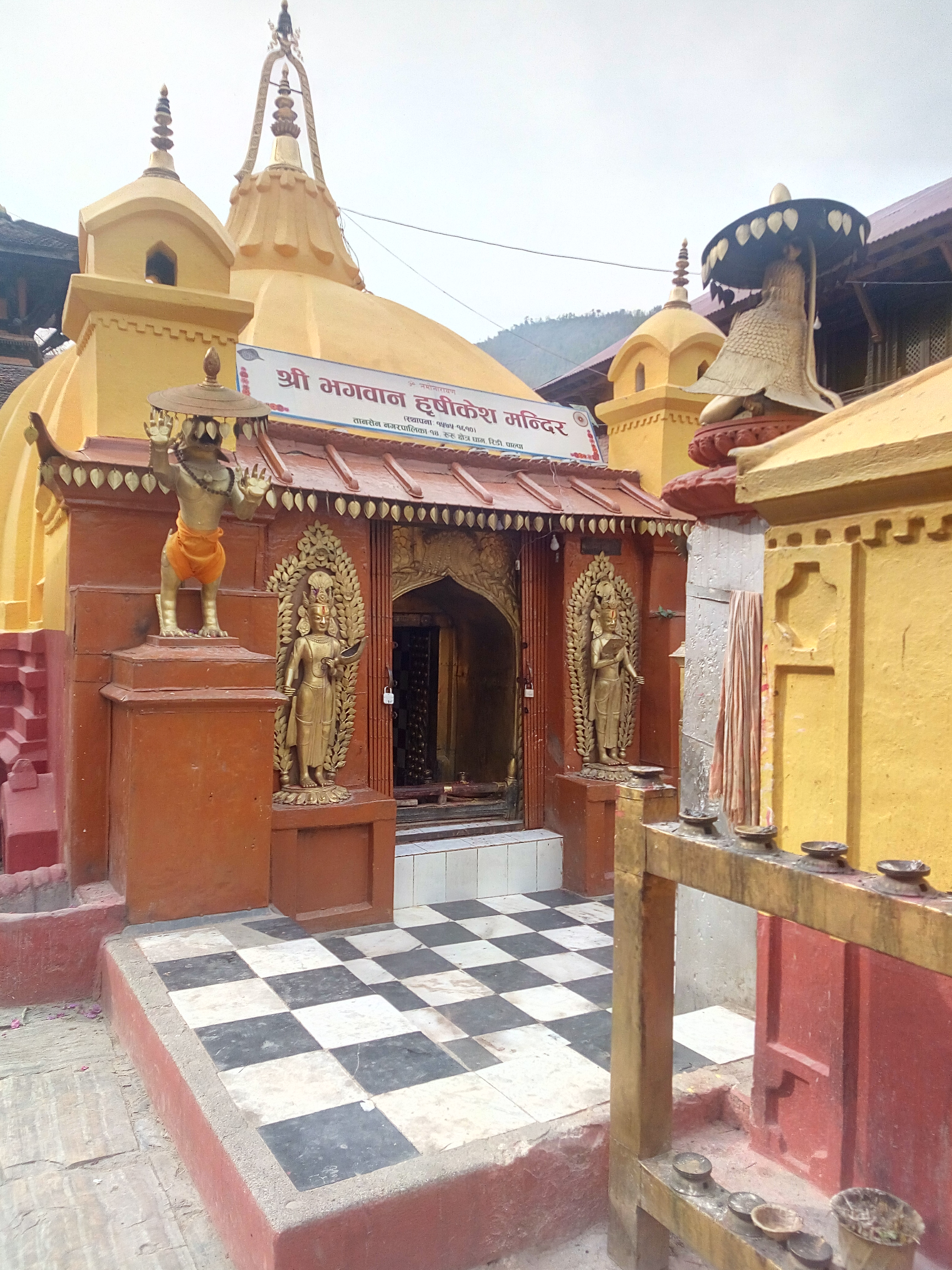

- Location in Nepal Ruru Kshetra (Gandaki Province) Ruru Kshetra (Lumbini Province)
- Coordinates: 27.934525°N 83.437684°E
- Country: Nepal
- District: Tri-junction of Gulmi, Palpa and Syangja
- Province: Lumbini Province and Gandaki Province

Ruru Kshetra (Nepali: रूरू क्षेत्र), also known as Ridi (रिडी), is a religious and cultural place situated on the confluence of Ridi Khola and Kaligandaki river in Nepal. It is also tri-junction of Gulmi, Palpa and Syangja districts. It is one of the Char Dham in Nepal.

Char Dham, Nepal

An age long fair 'Ridi Mela' is held during Maghe Sankranti for three days. The first, second and third days are called as Jethi Sankranti, Maili Sankranti and Kanchhi Sankranti respectively. It is believed that one obtains Moksha if a holy bath is taken on Kaligandaki river for the three days and worshipping in Rishikesh Temple. The Rishikesh Complex of Ruru Kshetra is in UNESCO World Heritage tentative list.

== Legend ==
According to legend Mukund Sen, a 16th century king of Palpa, discovered the idol of Rishikesh while having a dip in the Kaligandaki river and established the temple of Rishikesh.

== See also ==
- Rishikesh Complex of Ruru Kshetra
