= Rishikesh Complex of Ruru Kshetra =

Hindu pilgrimage and cremation site

The Rishikesh Complex of Ruru Kshetra (Rishikesh Temple) is located in southwestern Nepal in the Palpa District, Lumbini Province. It is an important Hindu pilgrimage as well as cremation site referred to in the Hindu epics.

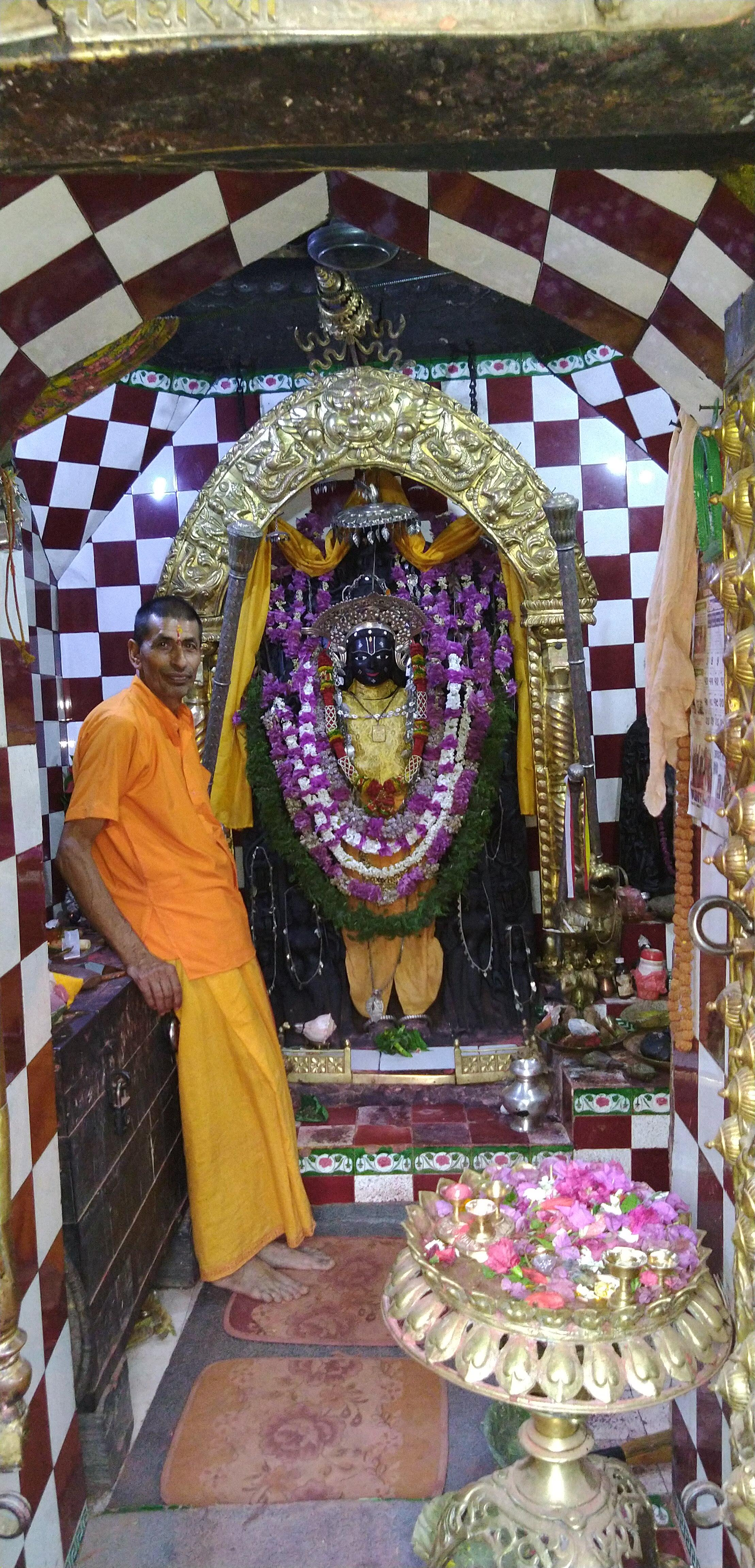
Rishikeshdham Temple

== Site description ==
The complex is a combination of numerous styles of architecture from the medieval period and Sen period. The site is still well preserved and in use today as a sacred Hindu site where important Vedic rituals are performed.

The adjacent settlement of Ridi still retains its medieval character and architecture with its close linkage to the Rishikesh Complex. The living heritage of Rishikesh of Ruru Kshetra is still preserved, with fairs and festivals being held regularly, ancient worship practices related to the propagation of Vedic rituals and culture and the practice of Bhaktini Amas (female mendicants).

== World Heritage status ==
This site was added to the UNESCO World Heritage Tentative List on January 30, 2008 in the Cultural category.
