= Varagung Muktichhetra Rural Municipality =

Varagung Muktichhetra वारागुङ मुक्तिक्षेत्र
- Rural municipality
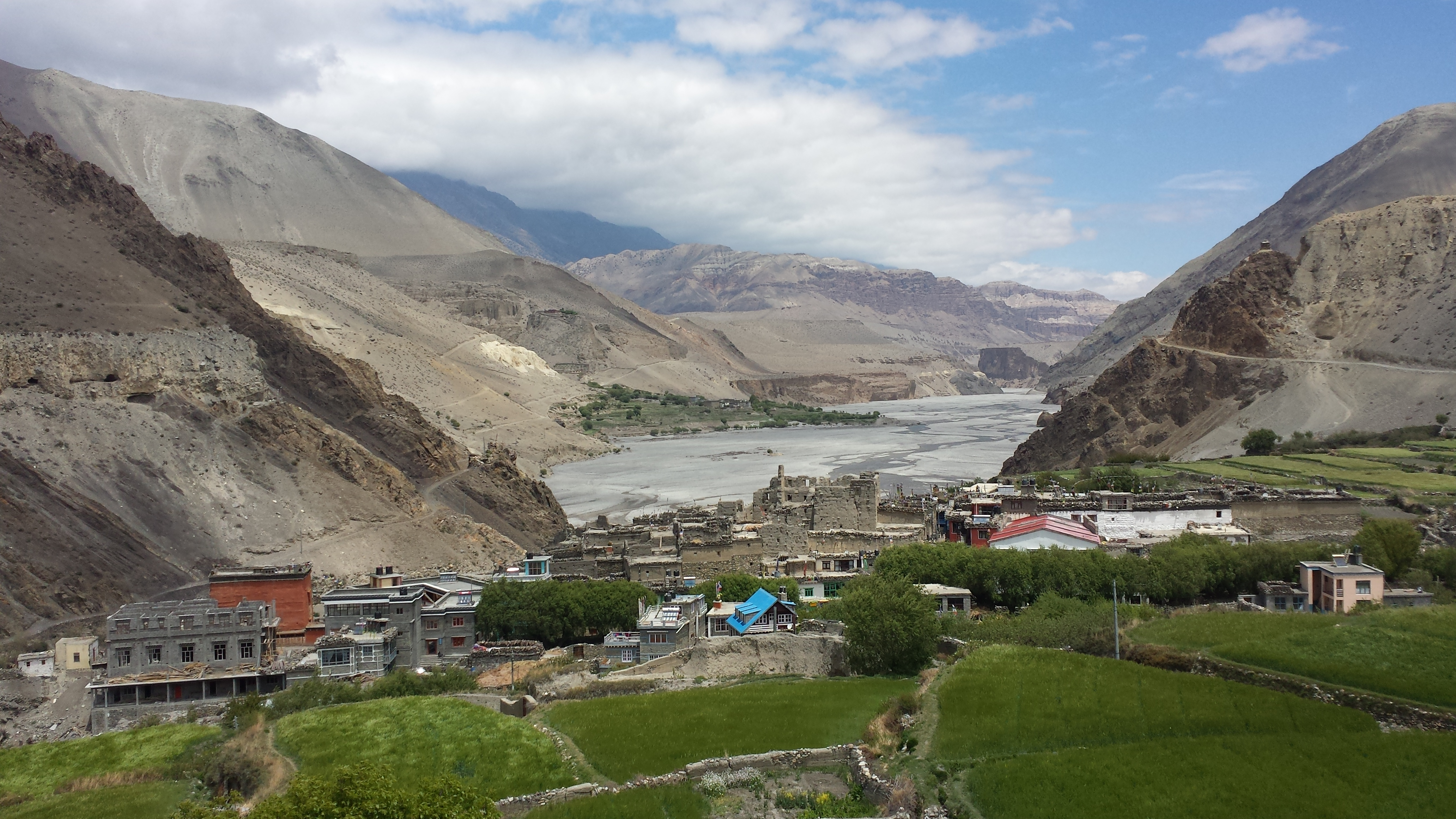
- Kagbeni, the admin center of Baragung Muktichhetra

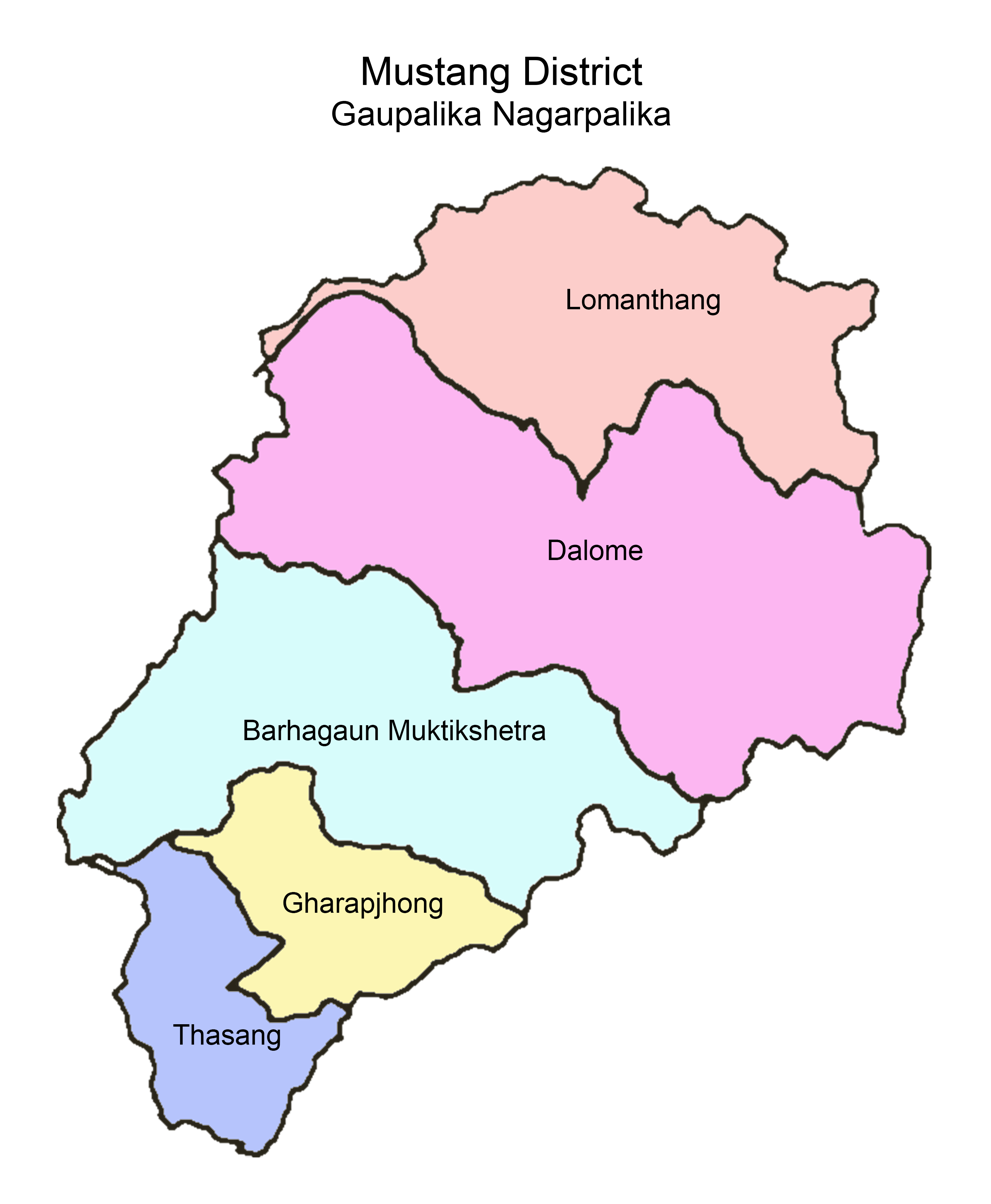

- Location in province Varagung Muktichhetra (Nepal)
- Coordinates: 28°50′12″N 83°46′59″E
- Country: Nepal
- Province: Gandaki Province
- District: Mustang
- Wards: 5
- Established: 10 March 2017

Government
  - Type: Rural council
  - Body: Barhagaun Muktichhetra Rural Council
  - Chairperson: Mr. Rinzen Namgel Gurung (NCP)
  - Deputy-Chairperson: Dhiki Gurung (NCP)

Area
  - Total: 885.78 km^{2} (342.00 sq mi)
- Highest elevation: 5,310 m (17,420 ft)
- Lowest elevation: 2,800 m (9,200 ft)

Population (2011)
  - Total: 2,330
  - Density: 2.63/km^{2} (6.81/sq mi)
- Time zone: UTC+5:45 (Nepal Time)
- Headquarters: Kagbeni
- Website: varagungmuktichhetramun.gov.np

Varagung Muktichhetra (Nepali: वारागुङ मुक्तिक्षेत्र), earlier Bahragaun Muktichhetra is a rural municipality situated in Mustang District of Gandaki Province of Nepal The rural municipality is situated on the southern part of the Mustang, surrounded by Dalome rural municipality on the north, Gharpajhong and Thasang rural municipalities on the south, Manang District on the east and Dolpa District on the west. The north-southern border of the rural municipality touches the Myagdi District boundary.

The total area of the rural municipality is 885.78 square kilometres (342.00 mi^{2}) and the total population, according to 2011 Nepal census, is 2,330 individuals. The rural municipality is divided into 5 wards. The admin center of the rural municipality is at Kagbeni.

Kagbeni, Jhong, Chhusang and Muktinath village development committees were Incorporated while established this rural municipality. The rural municipality came into existence on 10 March 2017, fulfilling the requirement of the new Constitution of Nepal 2015, Ministry of Federal Affairs and General Administration replaced all old VDCs and Municipalities into 753 new local level bodies.

== Etymology ==
The rural municipality was named Bahrachhetra Muktinath at the time of establishment of this rural municipality. The rural municipality had to named Varagung Muktichhetra but by mistake it spelled to Bahragaun Muktichhetra, so in the first meeting of this rural council on 17 July 2017, it was decided to send a request to related office to make the corrections in the name of the rural municipality.

== Demographics ==
At the time of the 2011 Nepal census, Varagung Muktichhetra Rural Municipality had a population of 2,704. Of these, 59.8% spoke Gurung, 18.7% Thakali, 15.2% Nepali, 2.4% Magar, 1.9% Tamang, 1.2% Sherpa and 0.8% other languages as their first language.

In terms of ethnicity/caste, 60.5% were Gurung, 19.1% Thakali, 4.5% Kami, 3.8% Magar, 3.1% Hill Brahmin, 2.3% Chhetri, 2.1% Tamang, 1.5% Thakuri, 1.1% Sherpa, 0.5% Damai/Dholi and 1.6% others.

In terms of religion, 79.3% were Buddhist, 16.6% Hindu, 3.3% Bon, 0.5% Christian, 0.1% Kirati and 0.2% others.

In terms of literacy, 56.0% could read and write, 1.8% could only read and 42.2% could neither read nor write.

== Administrative divisions ==
Varagung Muktichhetra is divided into 5 wards:

Administrative wards
| Ward No. | Ward Name | Area (KM2) | Population | Ward Councillor |
|---|---|---|---|---|
| 1 | Muktinath | 59.55 | 628 | Mr. Pramesh Gurung |
| 2 | Jhong | 50.01 | 253 | Mr. Nohru Gurung |
| 3 | Chhusang | 490.78 | 512 | Mr. Binod Gurung |
| 4 | Kagbeni | 58.3 | 555 | Mr. Karma Ghacho Gurung |
| 5 | Phalyak | 227.15 | 382 | Mr. Surendra Gurung |

Varagung Muktichhetra

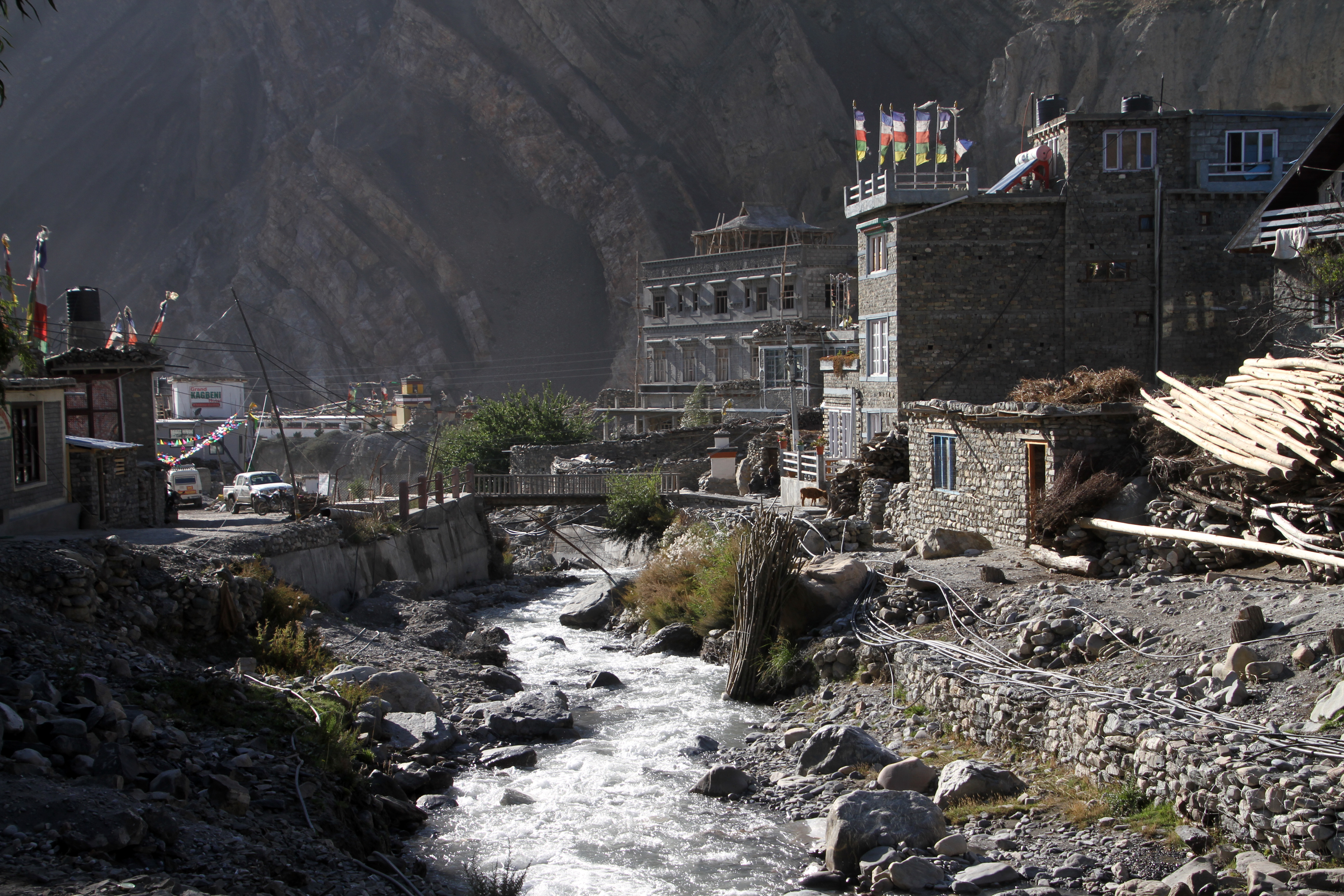
Jhong Khola in Kagbeni

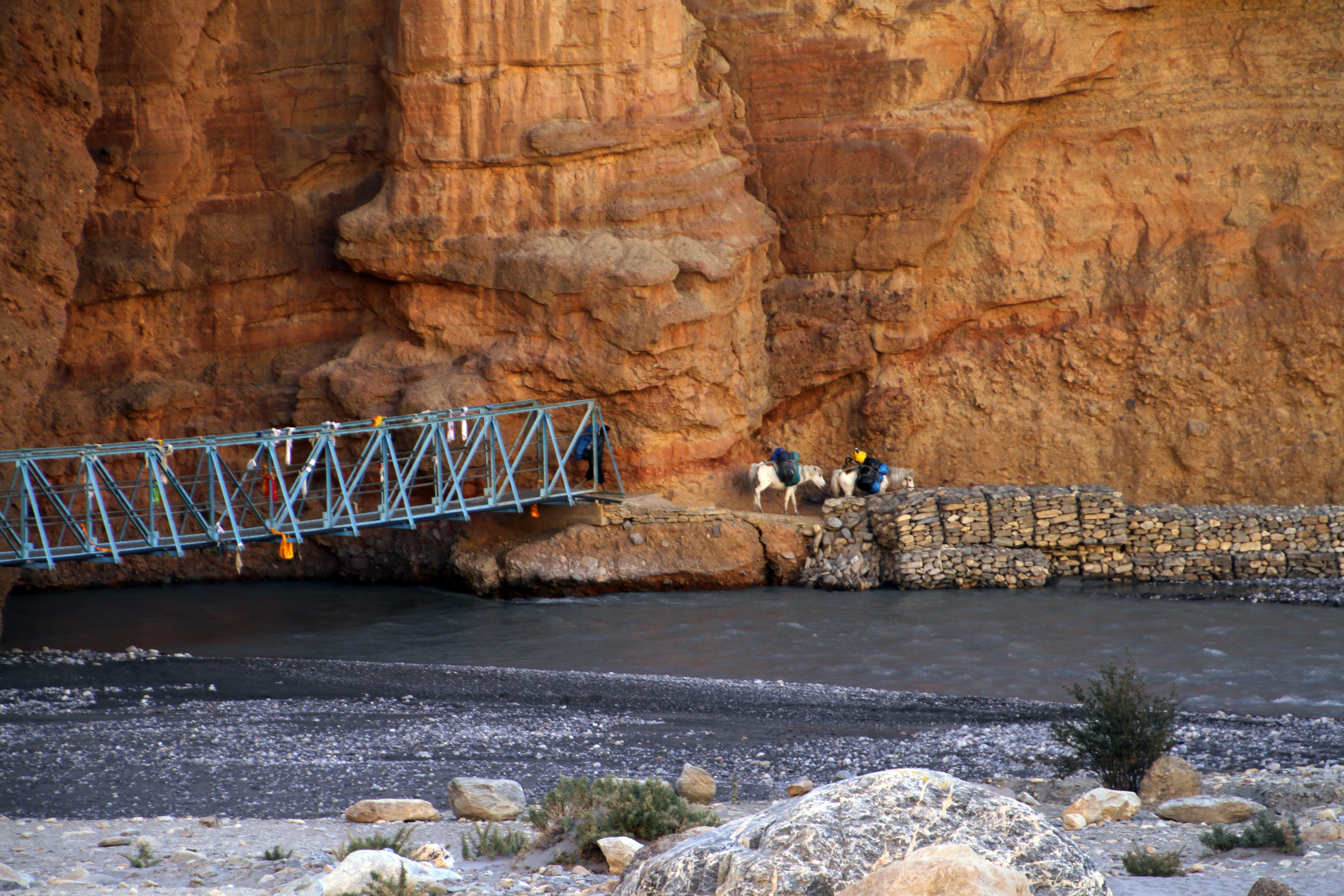
Kali Gandaki bridge in Tsele

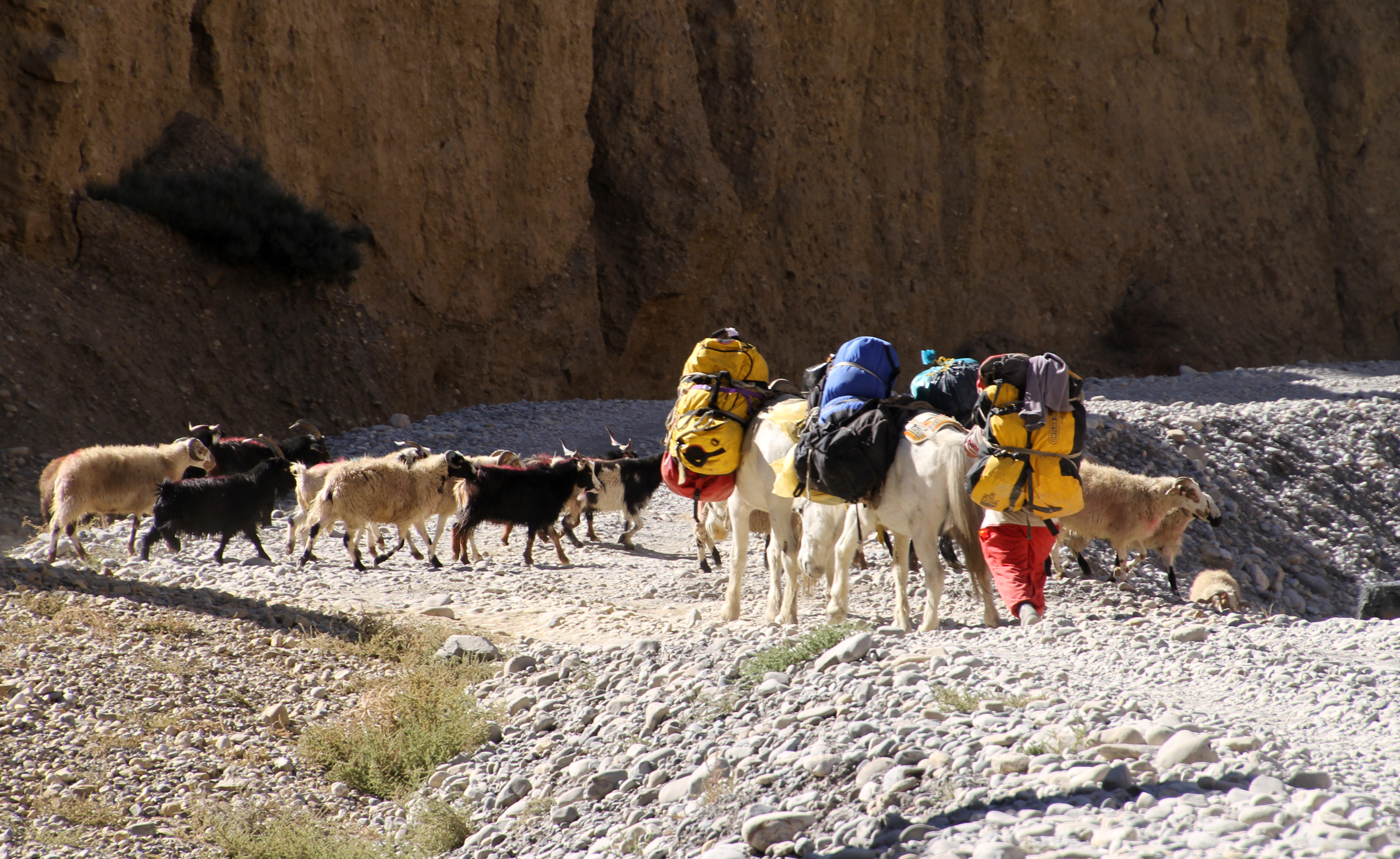
Trek from Chusang to Tsele

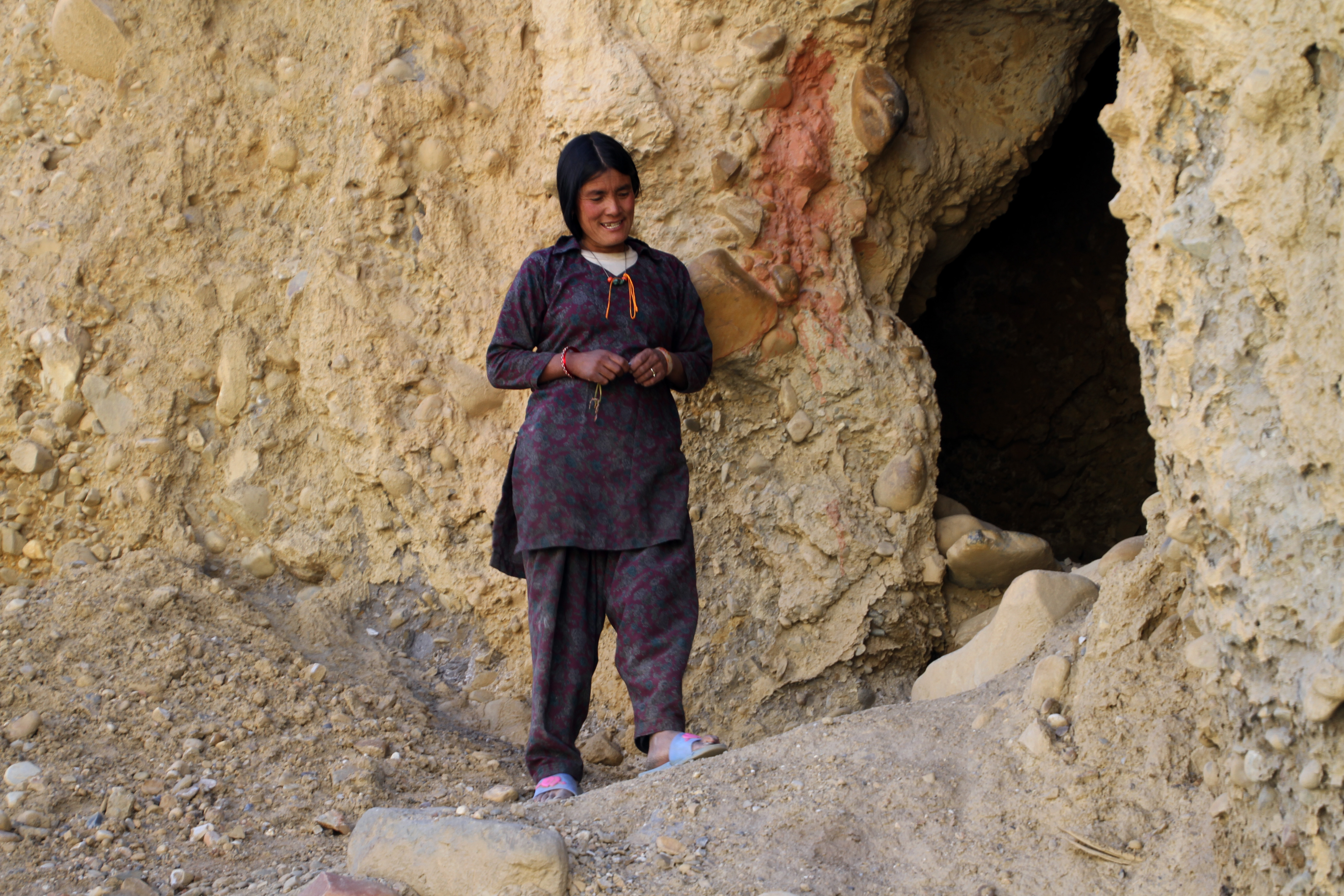
Metsin Lhakhang in Chhusang

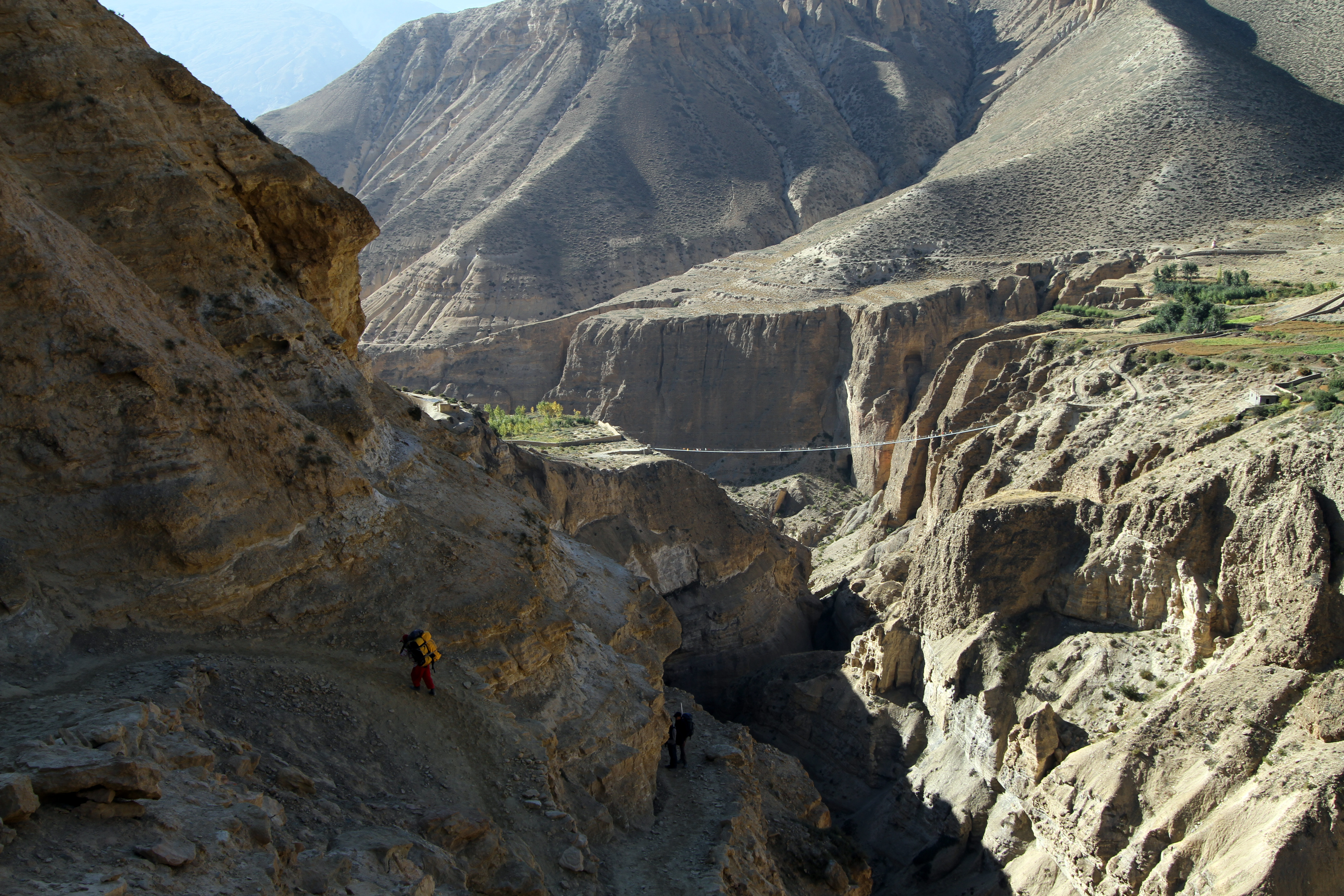
Gorge at Ghyakar

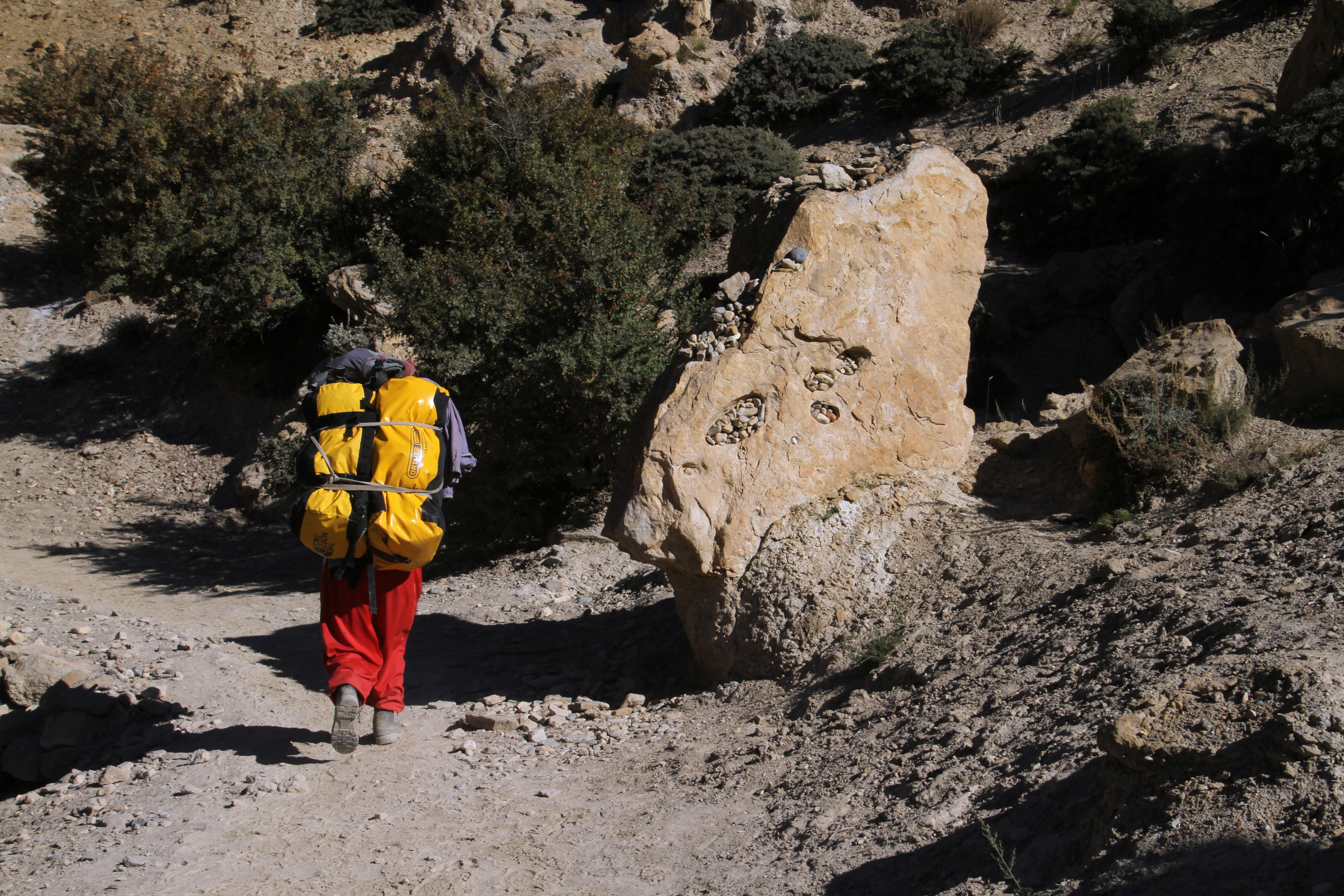
Porter on his way to Samar

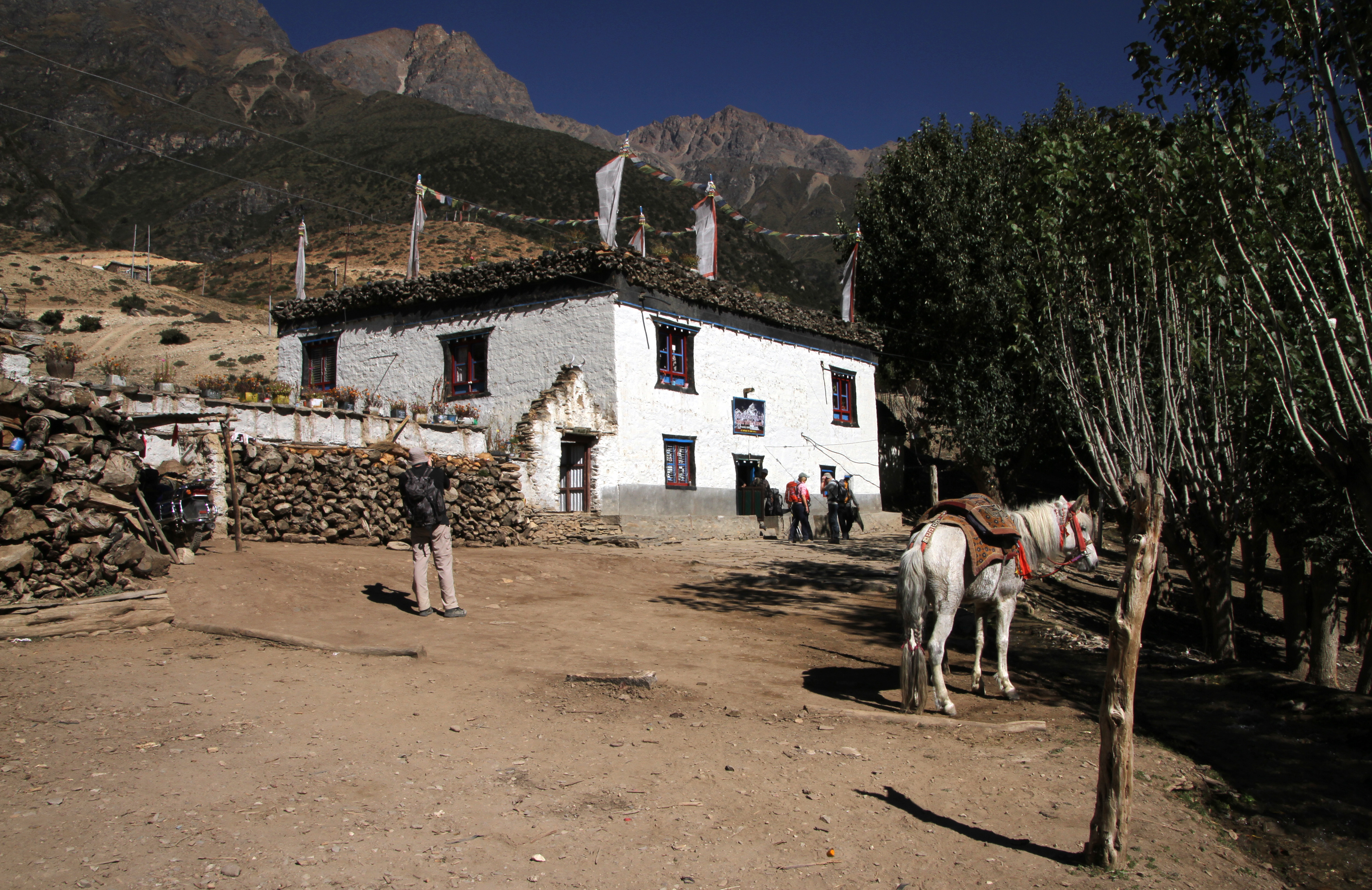
Guesthouse in Samar

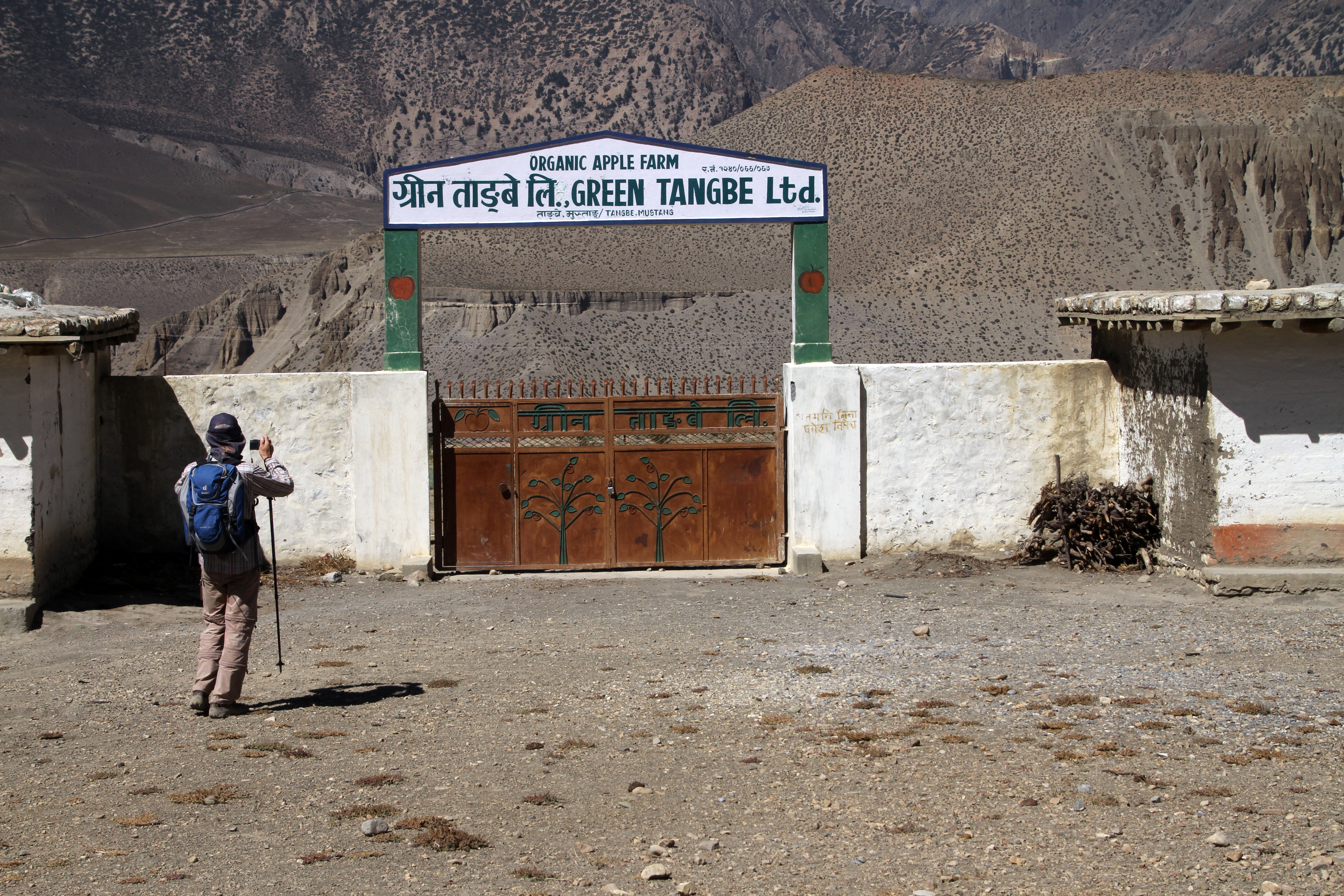
Apple farm in Tangbe
