= Kagbeni =

Kagbeni कागबेनी
- Incorporated village
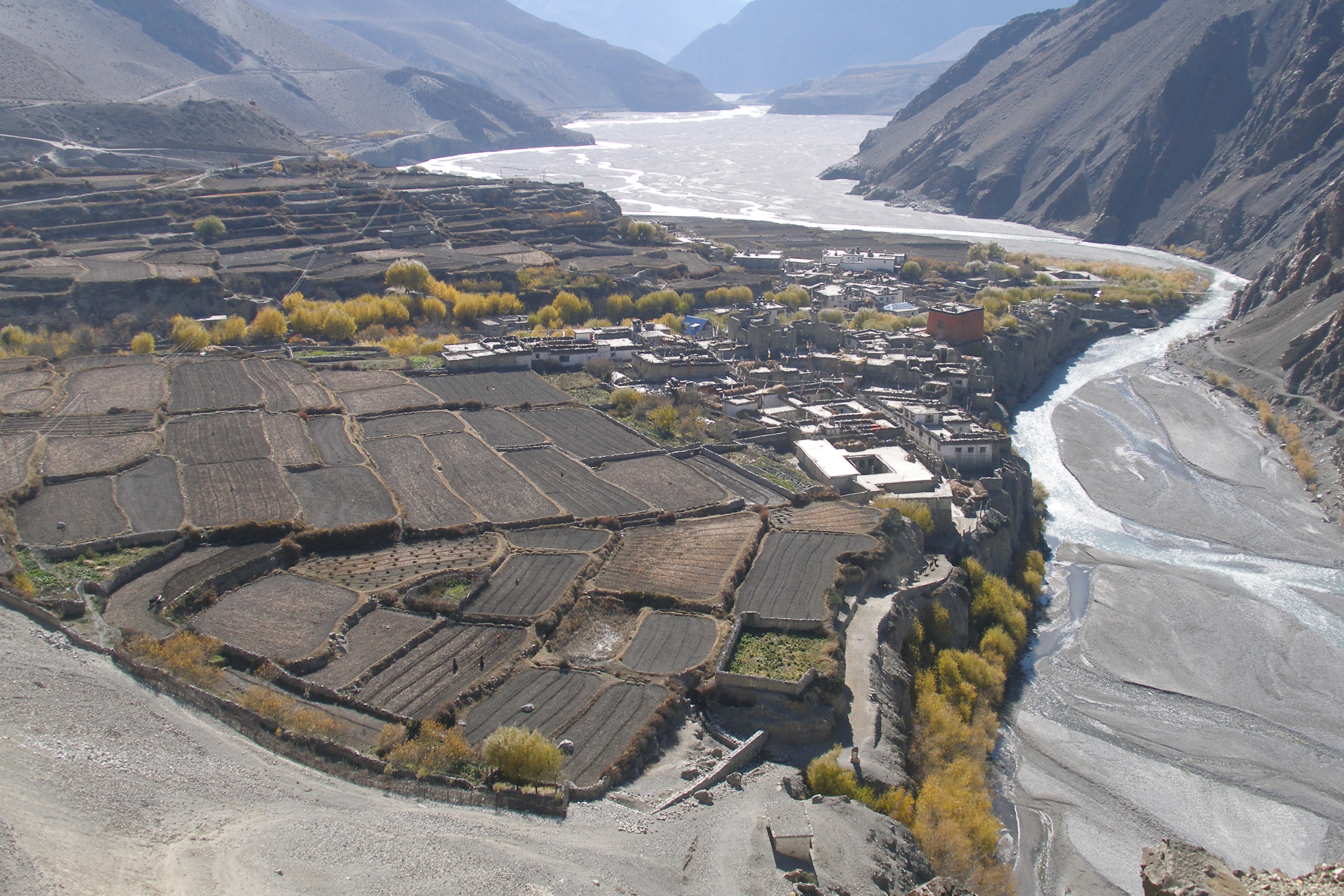
- Panoramic view of Kagbeni village

- Location in the province Kagbeni (Nepal)
- Coordinates: 28°50′12″N 83°46′59″E
- Country: Nepal
- District: Mustang
- Rural municipality: Baragung Muktichhetra
- Part of (wards): ward no. 4
- Established: 2017

Government
  - Type: Ward council
  - ward councillor: Mr. Tenzing Nagyal Gurung

Area
  - Total: 58.3 km^{2} (22.5 sq mi)
- Elevation: 2,804 m (9,199 ft)

Population (2011)
  - Total: 555
  - Density: 9.52/km^{2} (24.7/sq mi)
- Time zone: UTC+5:45 (Nepal Time)
- Website: varagungmuktichhetramun.gov.np/content/ward4

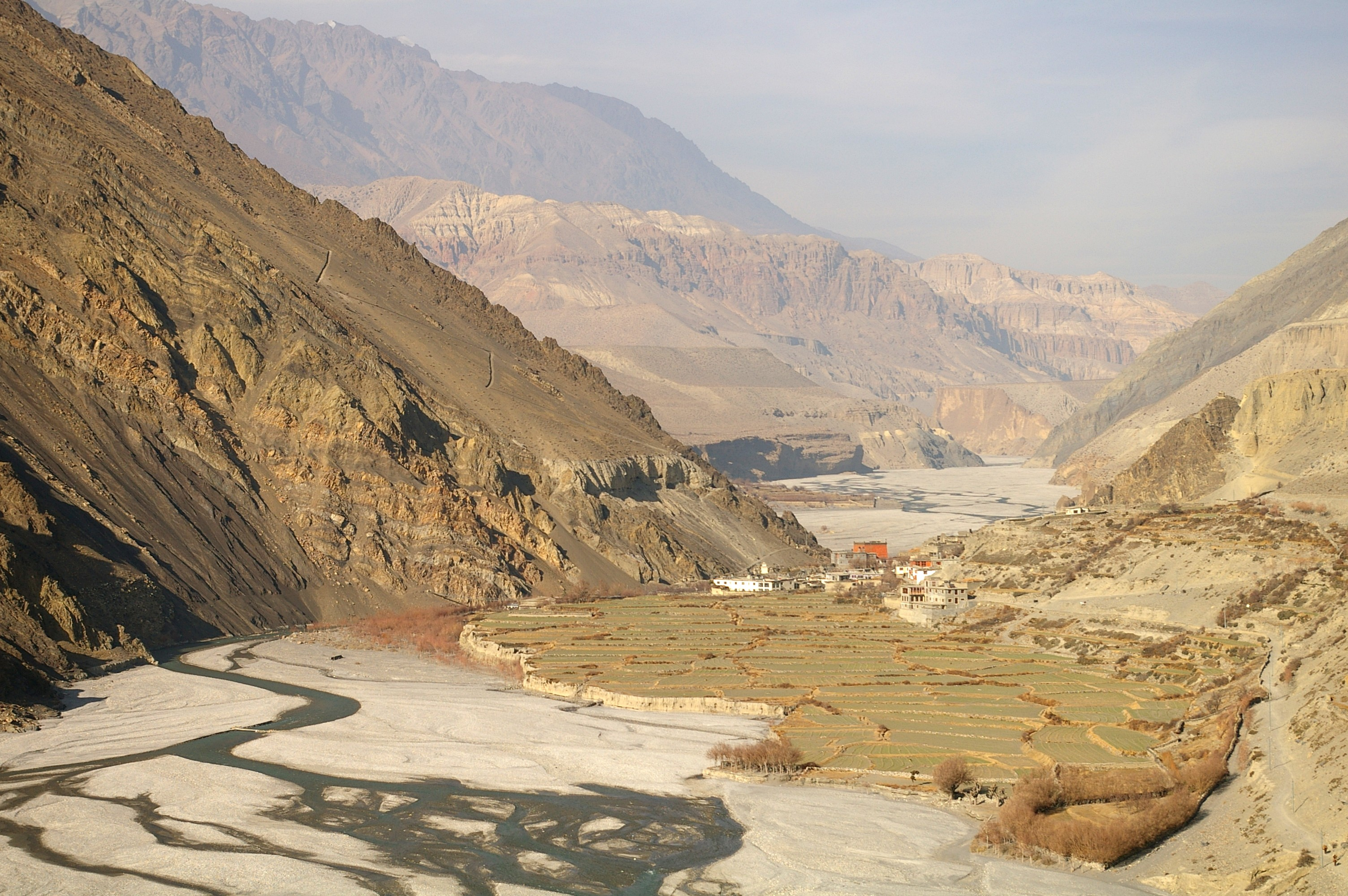
The Kali Gandaki River and rice fields near Kagbeni

Kagbeni is a village in the Baragung Muktikshetra rural municipality of Mustang District (Upper Mustang) of the Himalayas, in Nepal, located in the valley of the Kali Gandaki River. At the time of the 2011 Nepal census, it had a population of 555 people. The village lies on the trail from Jomsom to the royal capital Lo Manthang, near the junction with the trail to Muktinath. Kagbeni is also regarded as one of the oldest villages in the Himalayas. Kagbeni lies between two sacred rivers muktinath and kaligandaki.

== Gallery ==
Kagbeni, Mustang scenes
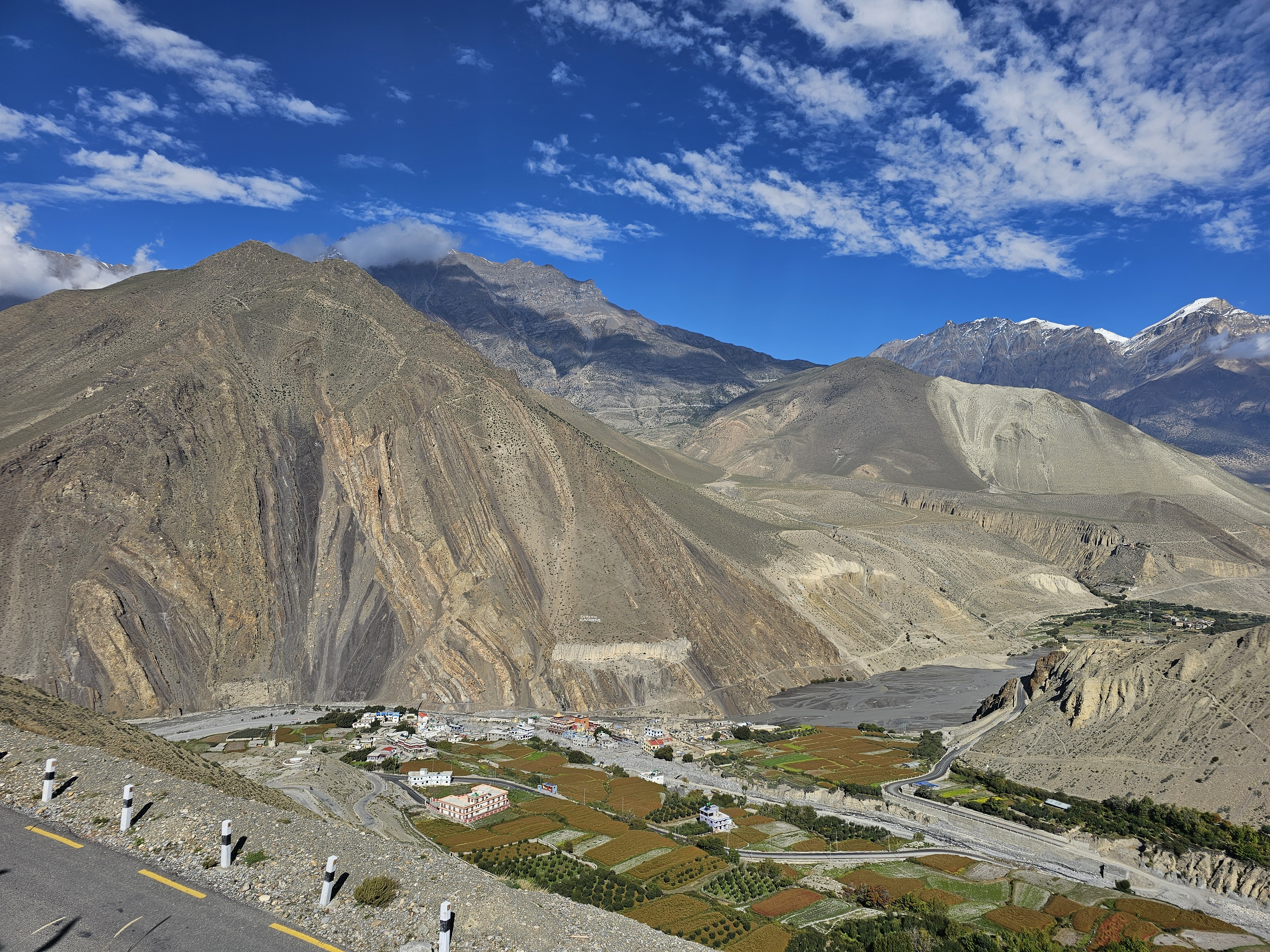
Kagbeni, Mustang, Nepal

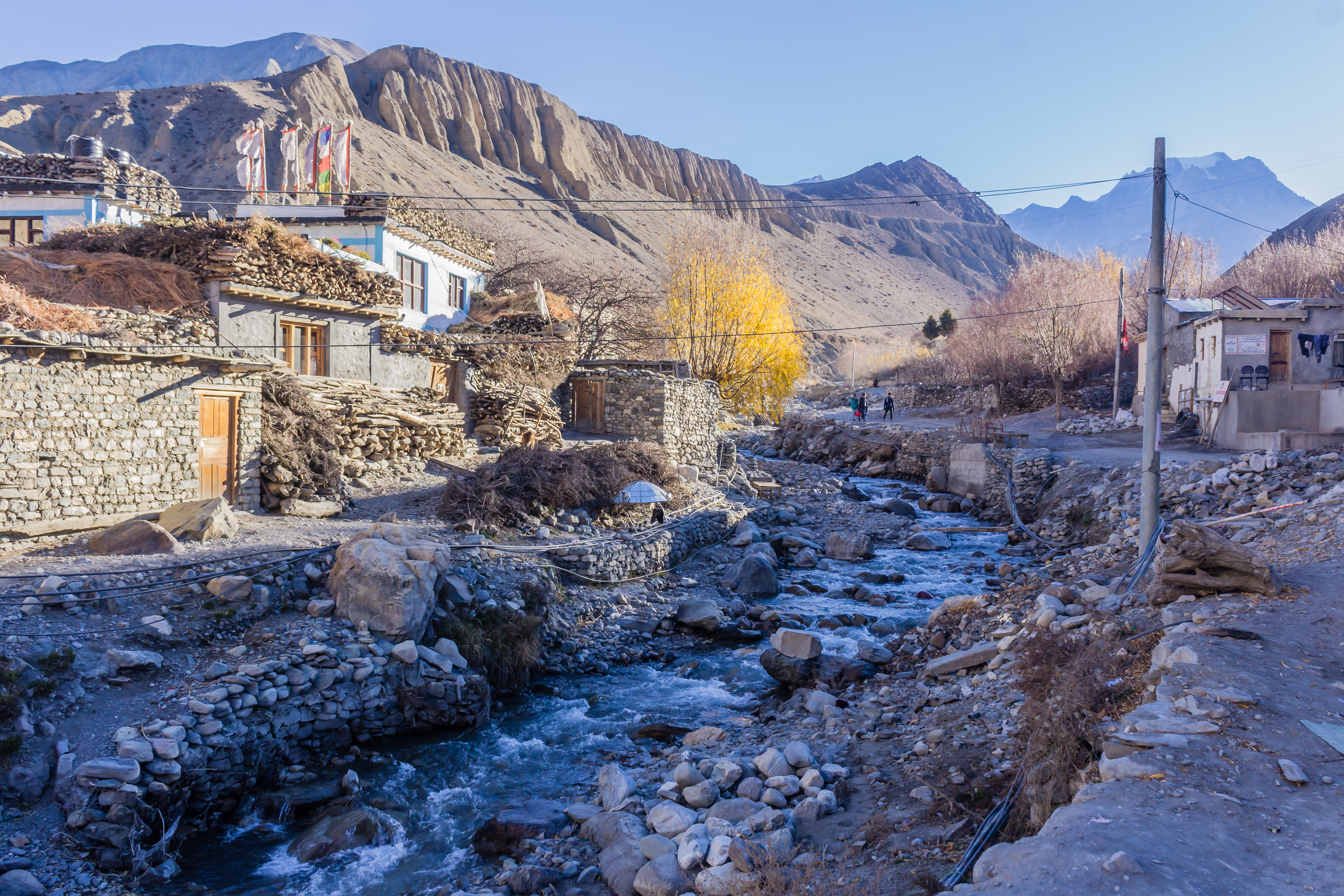
Kali Gandaki River at Kagbeni, Mustang

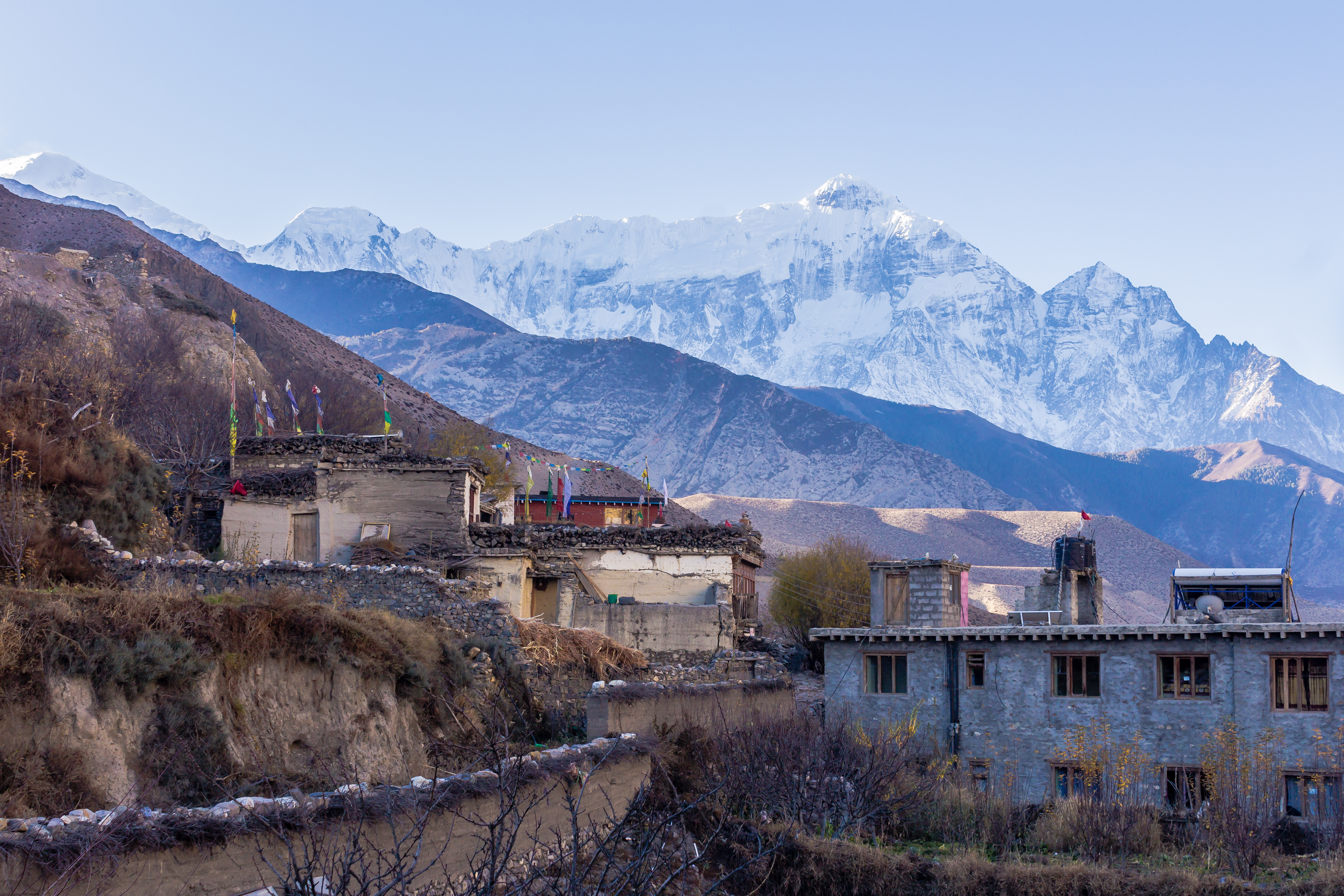
Nilgri North from Kagbeni, Mustang

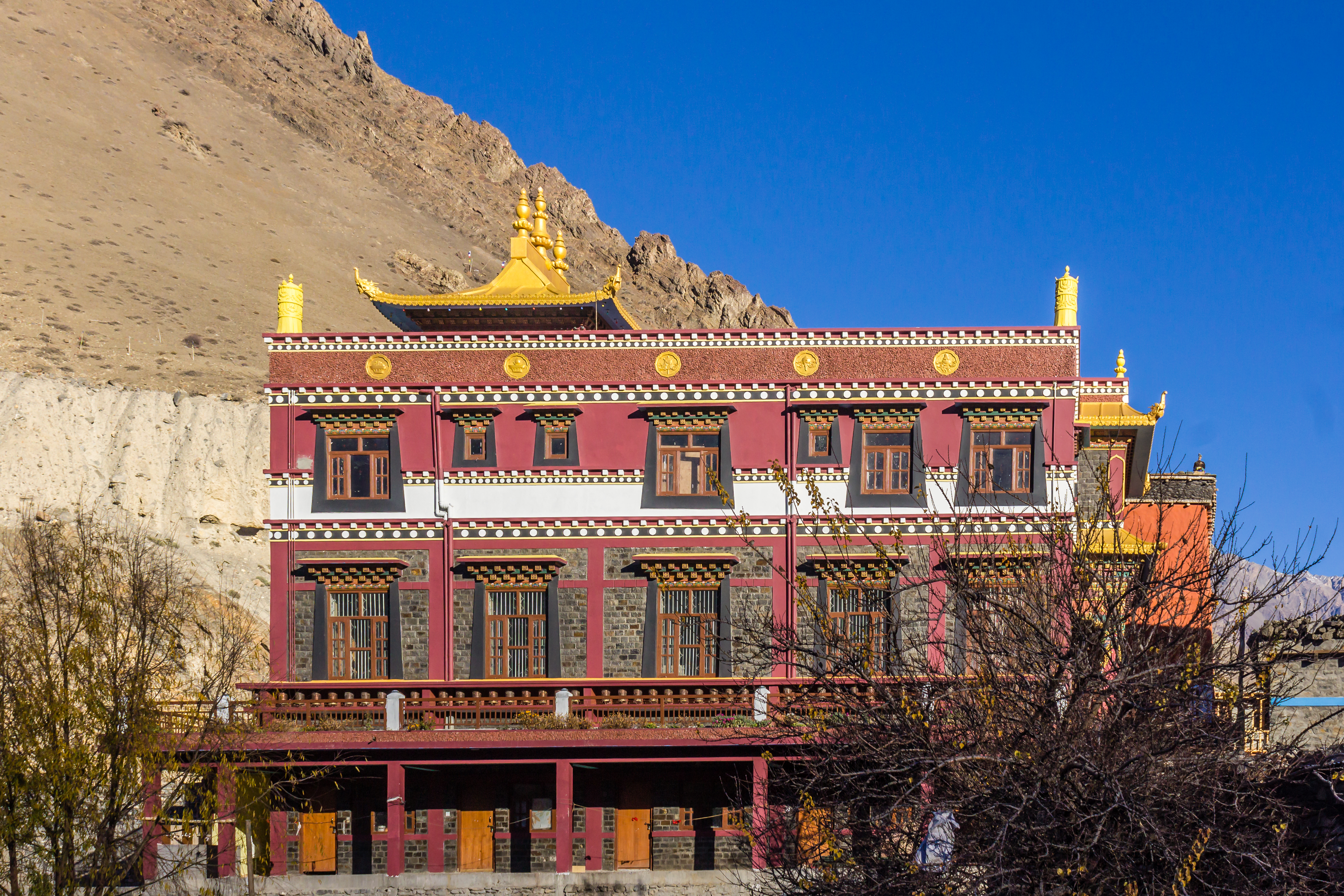
Kag chode, new Buddhist Temple at Kagbeni, Mustang

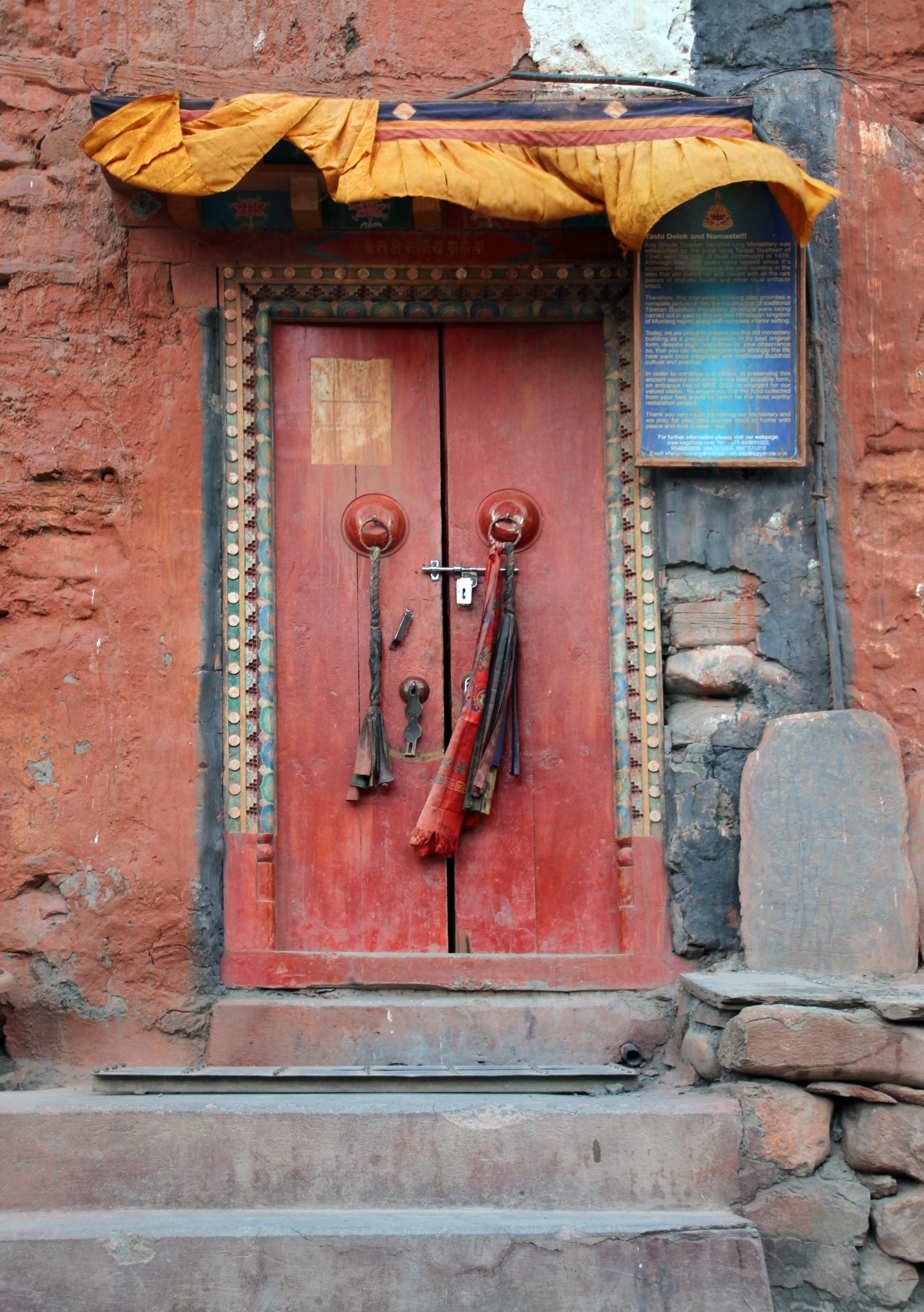
Door of old temple

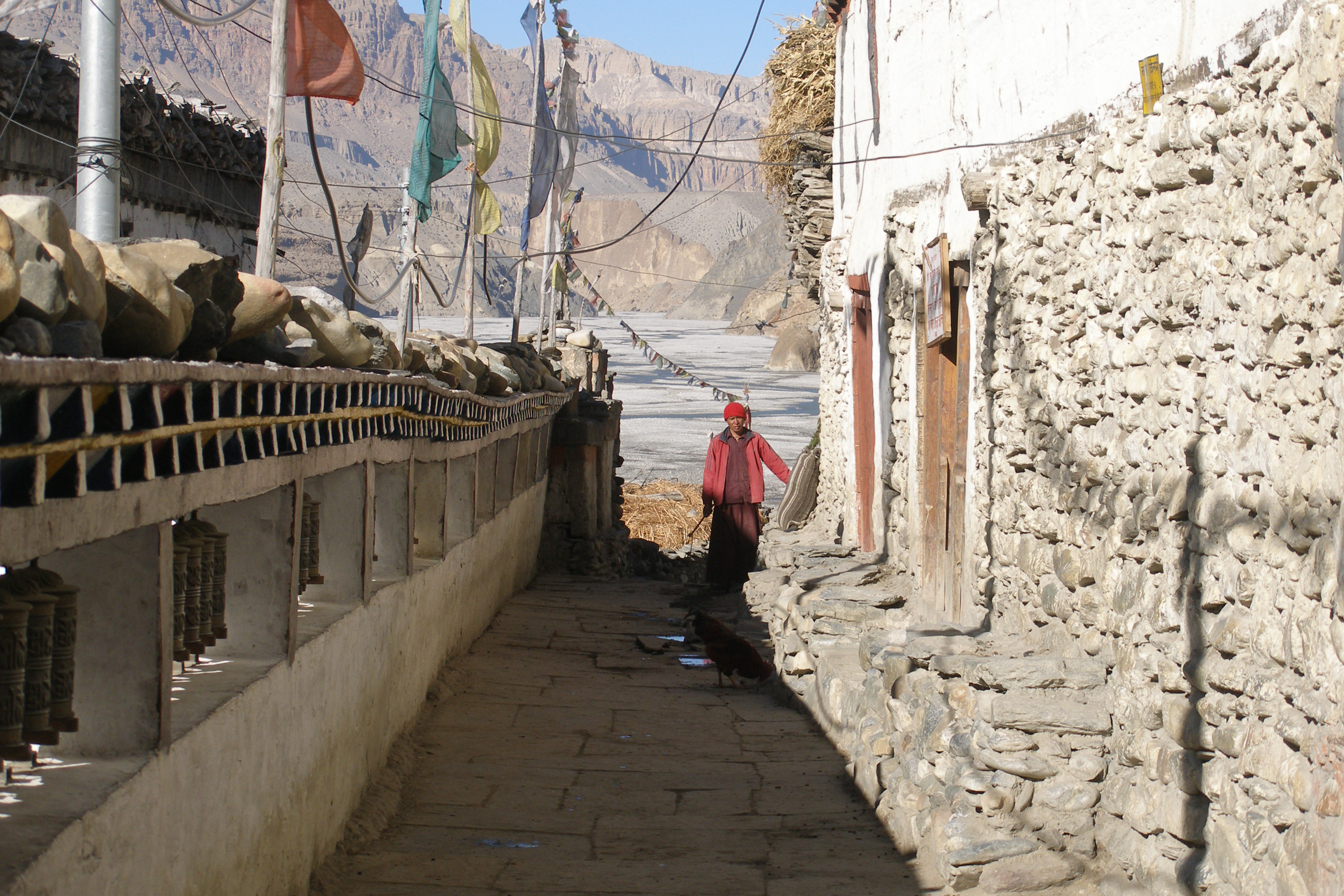
Alleyway

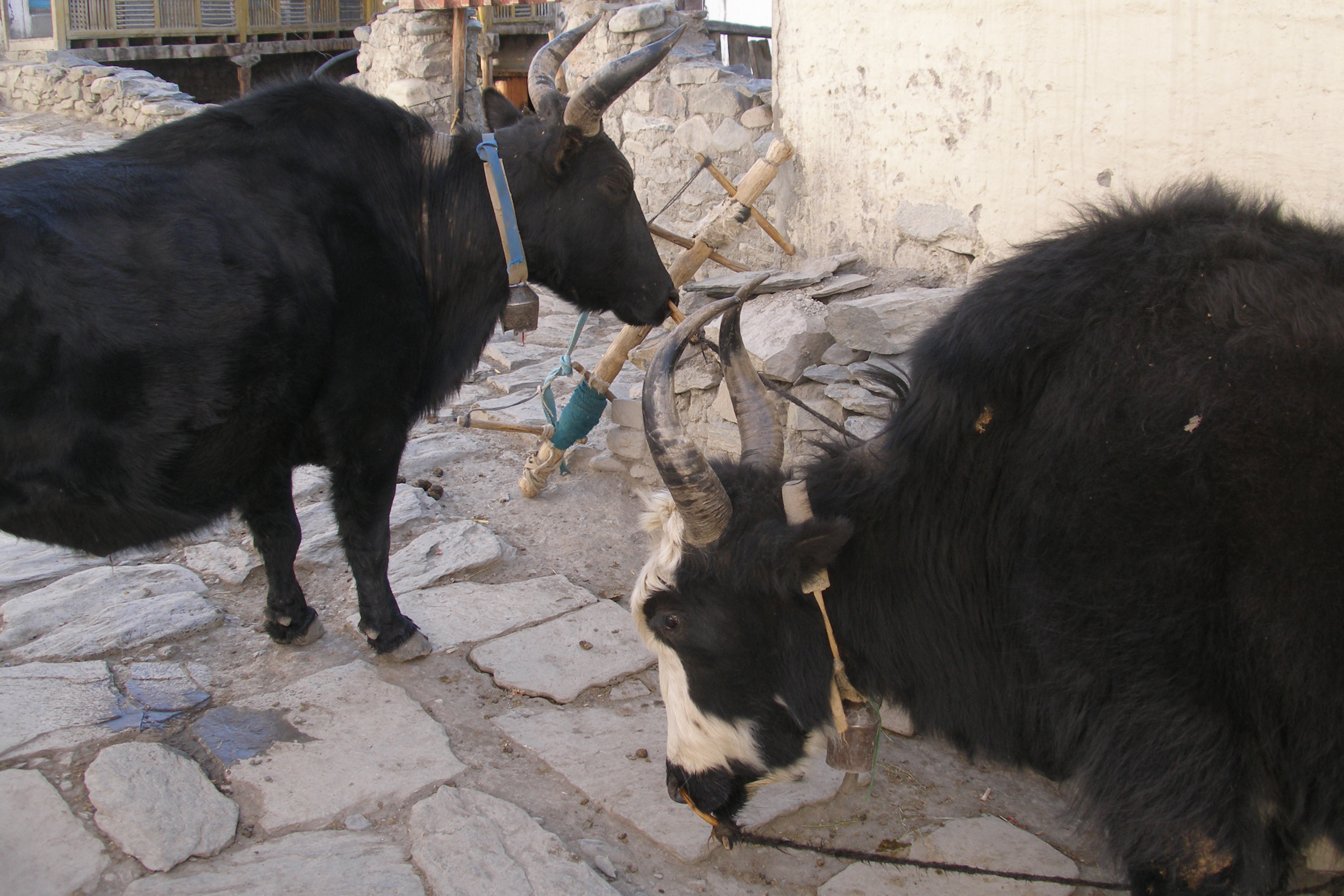
Bulls in Kagbeni

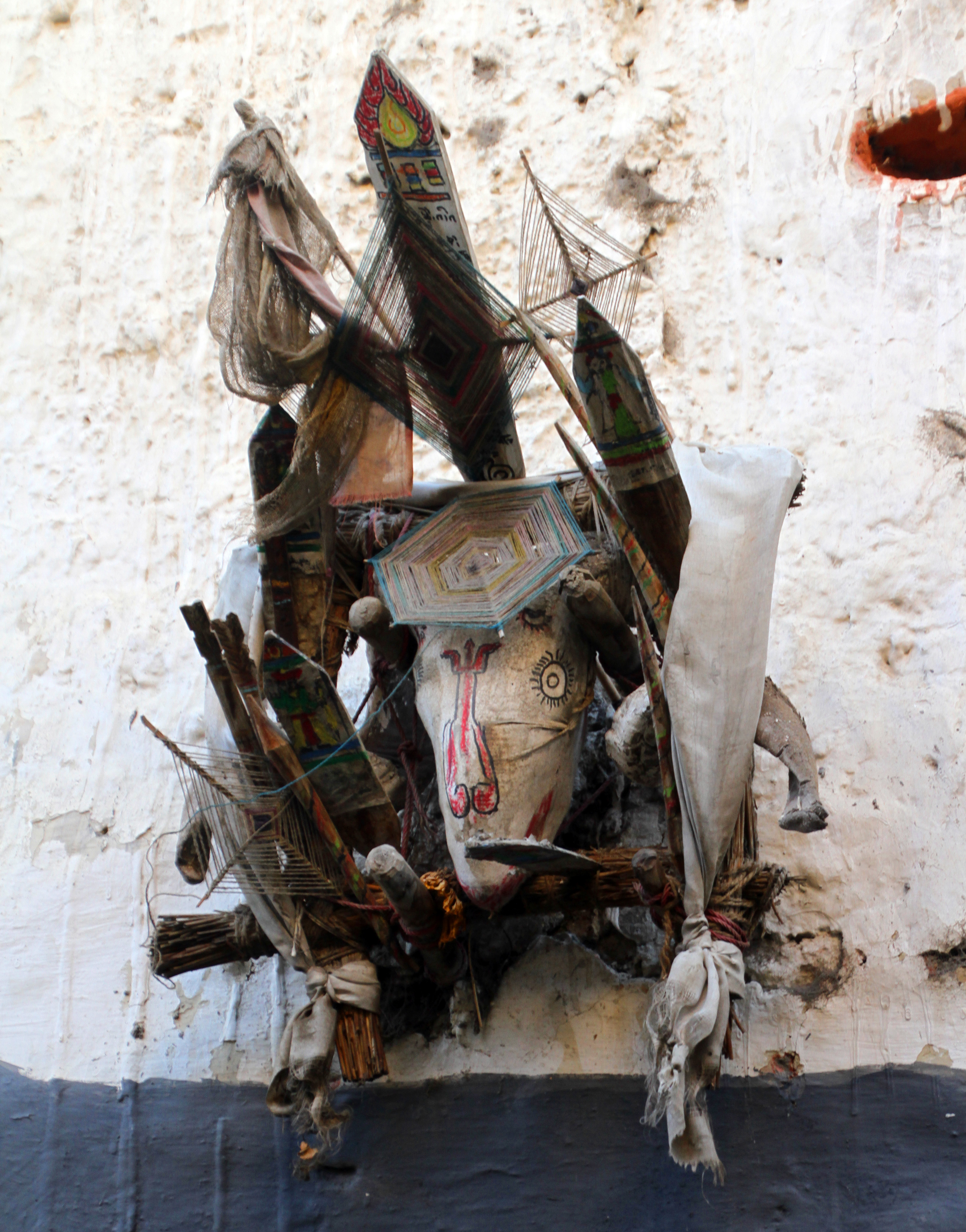
Ghost trap

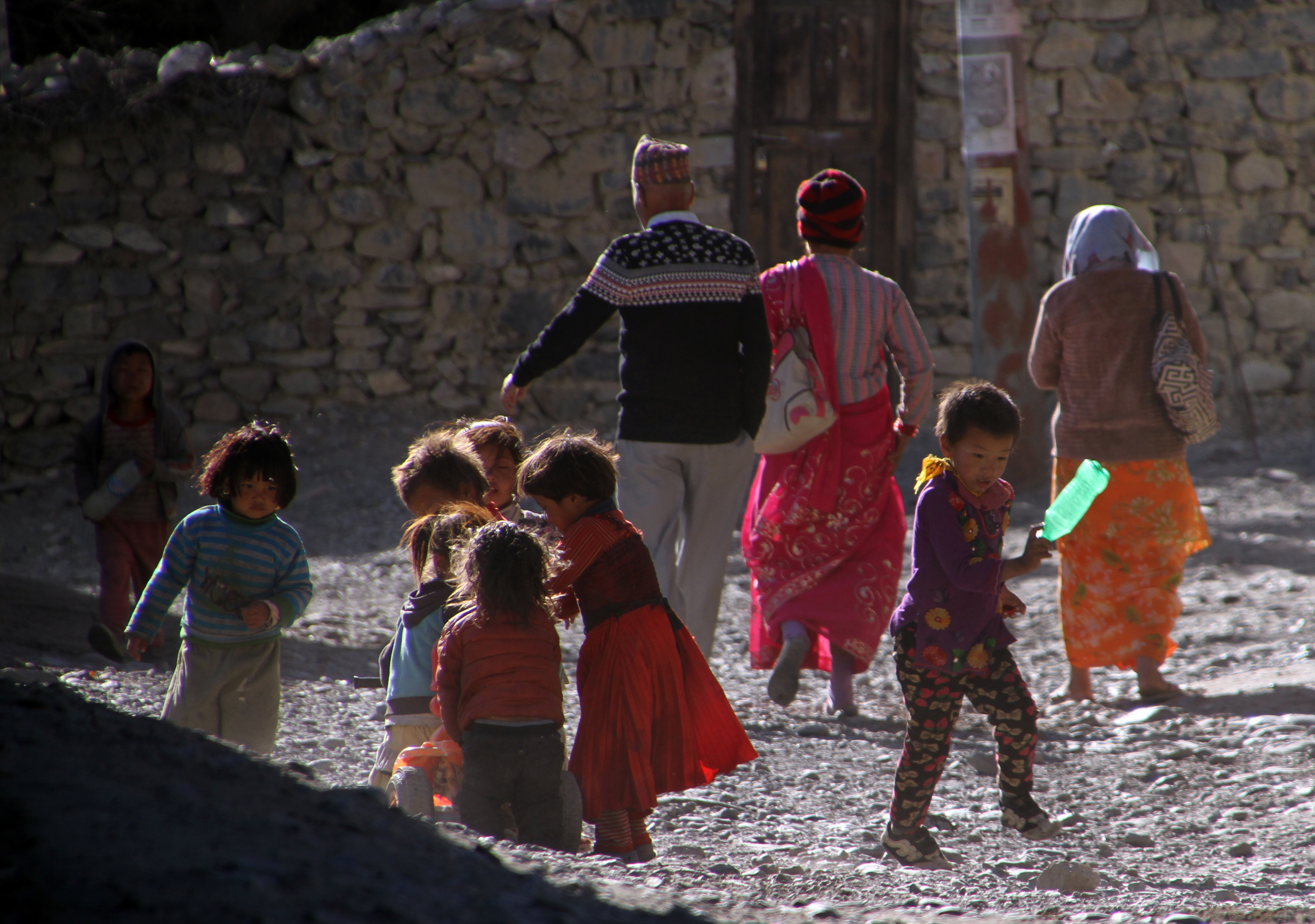
People of Kagbeni

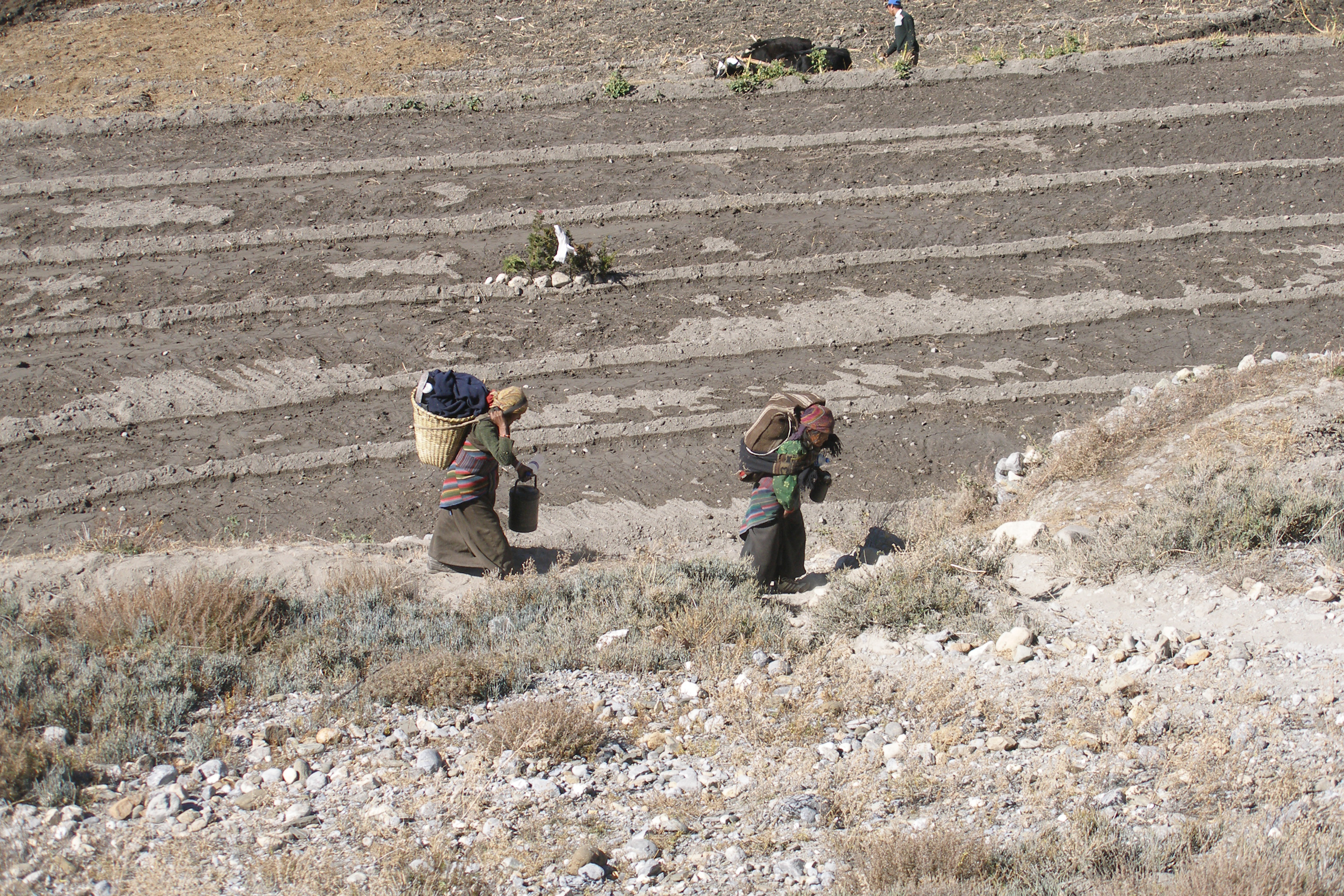
Rice fields
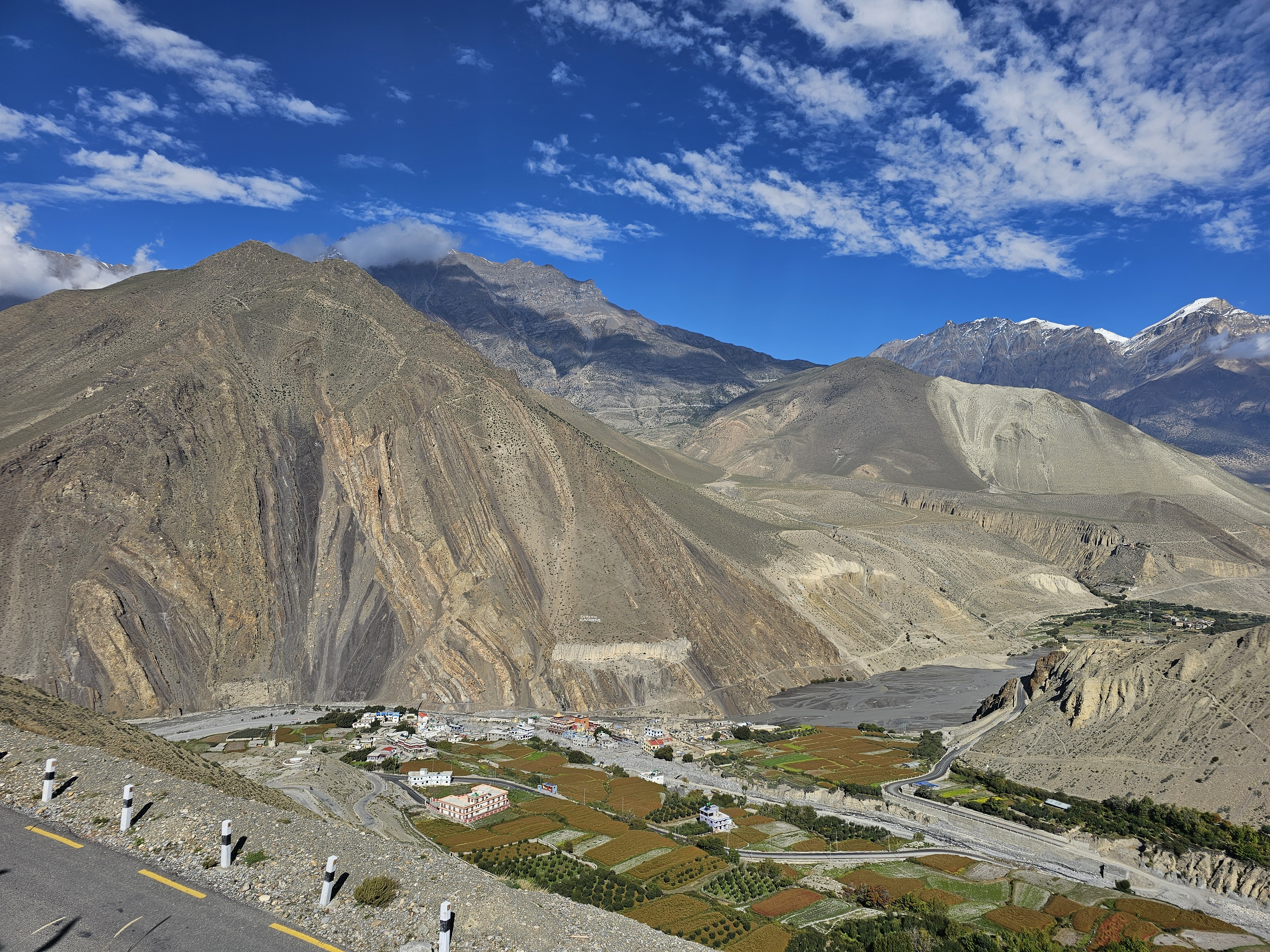
Kagbeni, Mustang, Nepal

== See also ==
- Jomsom Airport
- Kali Gandaki River
- Mustang District
- Upper Mustang
- Mustang Nepal
