= Putorana Nature Reserve =

Strict nature reserve in Krasnoyarsk Krai, Russia

Putoransky State Nature Reserve
- IUCN category Ia (strict nature reserve)
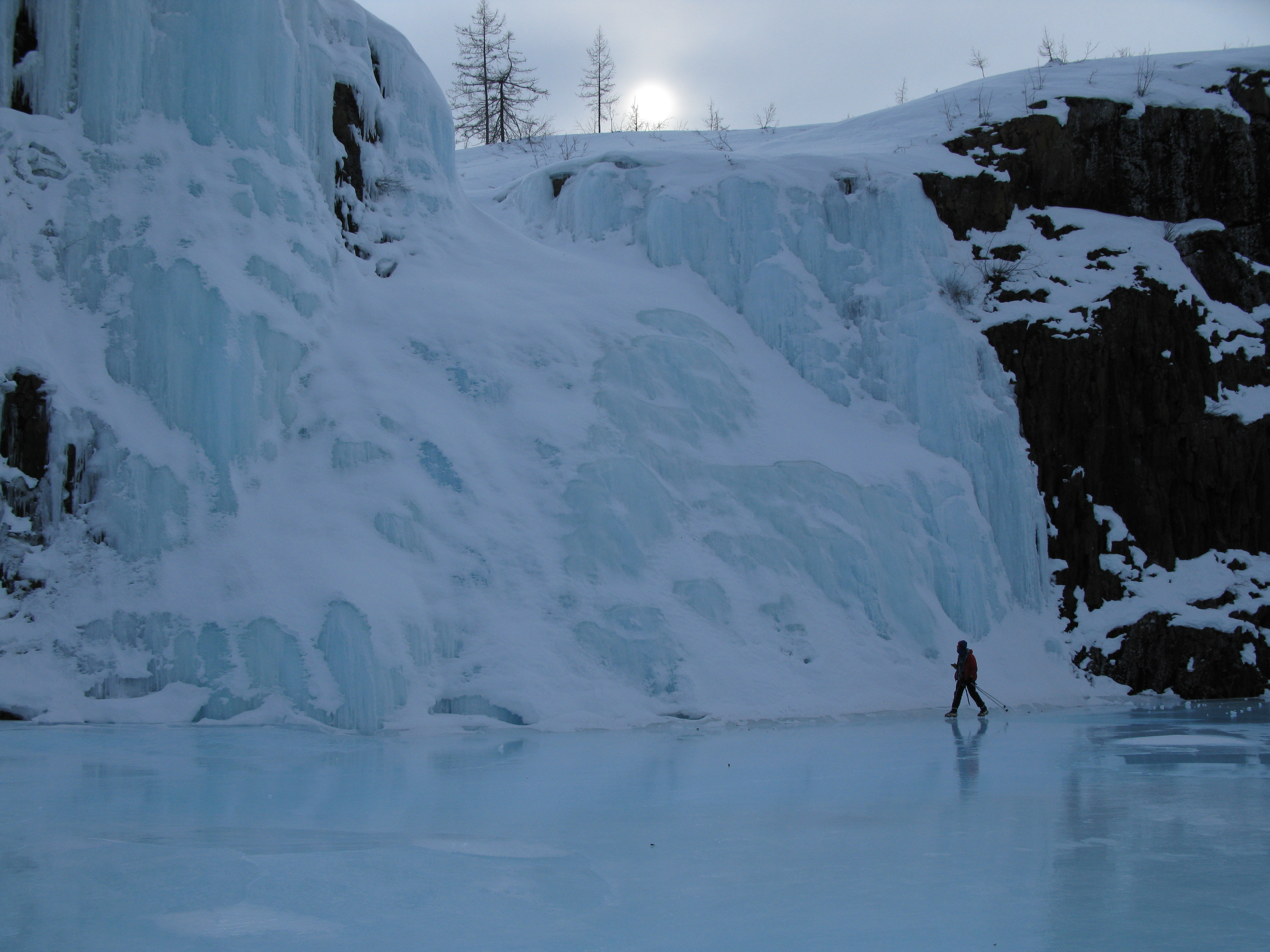
- Frozen waterfalls

- Location within Russia
- Location: Russia
- Nearest city: Norilsk
- Coordinates: 69°2′49″N 94°9′29″E
- Area: 18,872.5 km^{2} (7,286.7 sq mi)
- Established: 1987

Putorana nature reserve (Krasnoyarsk Krai)

Putoransky State Nature Reserve (Путоранский заповедник) is a Russian 'zapovednik' (strict nature reserve) in the northern part of Central Siberia in Russian Federation, located about 100 km north of the Arctic Circle in Krasnoyarsk Krai, includes the Putorana Plateau. It was established in 1987, and since 1987 has been designated as a World Heritage Site by UNESCO. It covers an area of 1,887,252 hectares of which 1,773,300 are monitored. Its headquarters are in Norilsk.

== Location and geography ==
Comprising a vast area of 1,887,251 ha, the park is located in the centre of the Putorana Plateau in the northern part of Central Siberia. The part of the plateau listed on the World Heritage Site contains complete subarctic and arctic ecosystems in an isolated mountain range. The combination of remoteness, naturalness and strict protection ensures that ecological and biological processes continue with minimal human interference. It is a complex of high flat-topped mountain massifs divided by deep and wide canyons. It was created 250 million years ago by a process known as plume volcanism, in which a huge body of magma rose to the surface from 1,800 miles (2,897 kilometers) inside the Earth. Next, the glaciers expanded the canyons and formed the present-day river gorges and deep narrow lakes (Lama, Keta, Glubokoye, Khantayskoye, Ayan, etc.) creating the unique appearance of the plateau. These exotic fjord-like lakes reaching 100–150 km in length and up to 400 metres (1,300 ft) deep are considered to be largest in Siberia after Baikal and Teletskoye. Another feature of the plateau are numerous waterfalls, including the 108 m high waterfall in Kanda river gorge considered to be Russia's highest. The area is also one of the richest in terms of plant diversity in the Arctic.

== Ecoregion and climate ==
Putorana is in the Taimyr-Central Siberian tundra ecoregion, which covers the Taymyr Peninsula in the Russian Far North. The climate is Tundra (Köppen climate classification Tundra climate (ET)). This indicates a local climate in which at least one month has an average temperature high enough to melt snow (0 °C (32 °F)), but no month with an average temperature in excess of 10 °C (50 °F).

== Flora ==
The area consists of pristine taiga, forest-tundra, tundra and arctic desert systems, as well as untouched cold-water lake and river systems. Most of the Putorana Plateau is covered by the Siberian larch taiga forests. The northern part by sparse forests and mountain tundra. There are around 400 plant species, including several rare and endemic forms.

== Fauna ==
There are 34 mammal species including one of the rarest known hoofed animals - the Putorana bighorn sheep (Ovis nivicola borealis). About 140 bird species have been noted in the reserve. Reindeer migration routes cross the reserve.

== Reserve missions ==
- Nature conservation and protection composed of lakes, mountain ranges and taïga
- Protection and study of its flora
- Protection and study of its fauna, including certain animals, such as the Snow sheep ( Ovis nivicola borealis ), are listed in the Russian Red Book of endangered species. Conservation and study of the wild reindeer population, the number of which is the largest in the world here.

== World Heritage ==
The territory of the nature reserve was registered in August 2010 in the list of World Heritage of UNESCO, for this isolated area of high plateau and mountains is ideal for studying the ecosystem arctic and subarctic, such as taiga, the semi-wooded tundra, or the arctic desert. The lakes and rivers in the area offer an example of a natural system untouched by humans and are another reason for the inscription of the territory as World Heritage, as well as the migrations of the wild reindeer that we observe here.

== Gallery ==
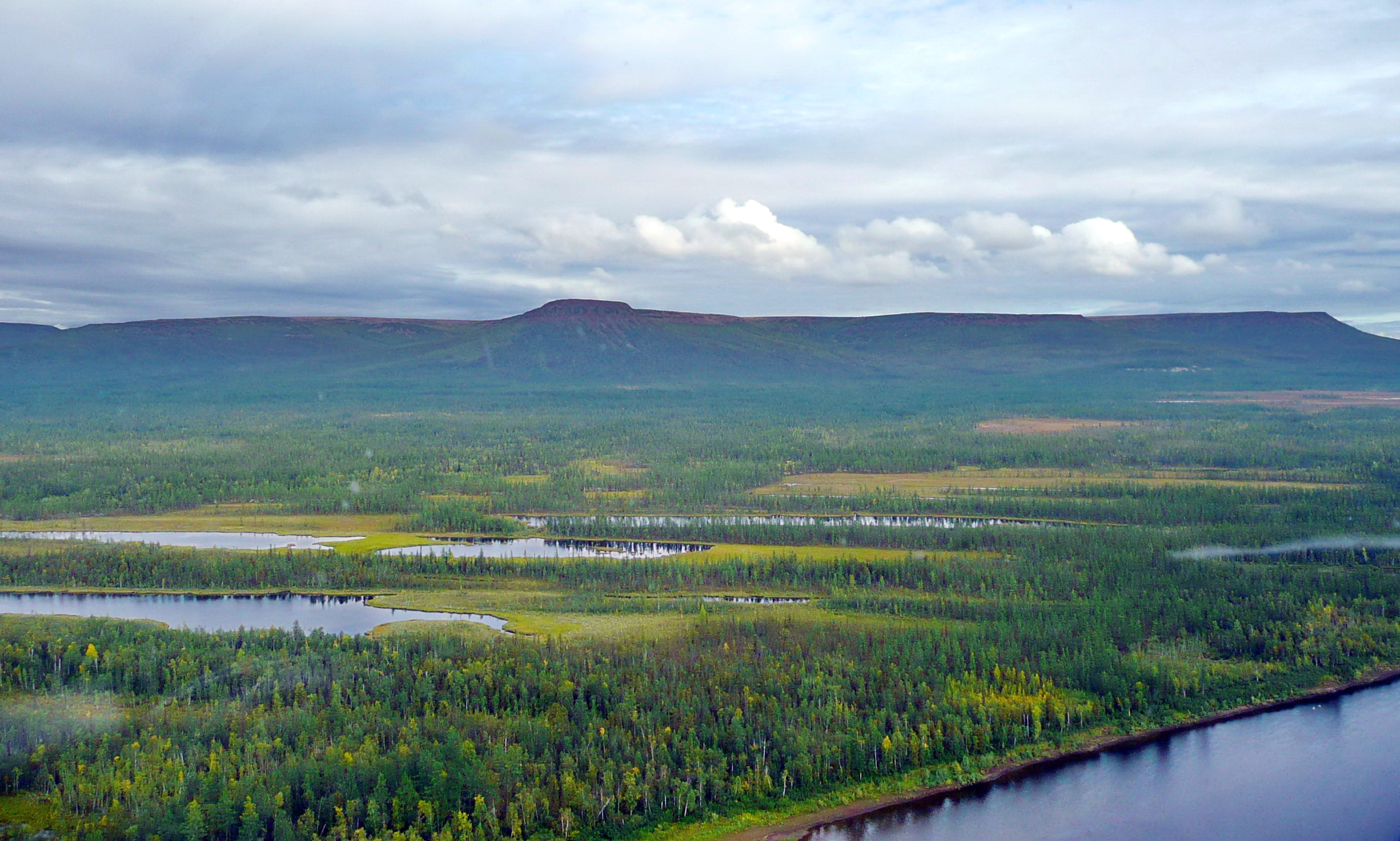

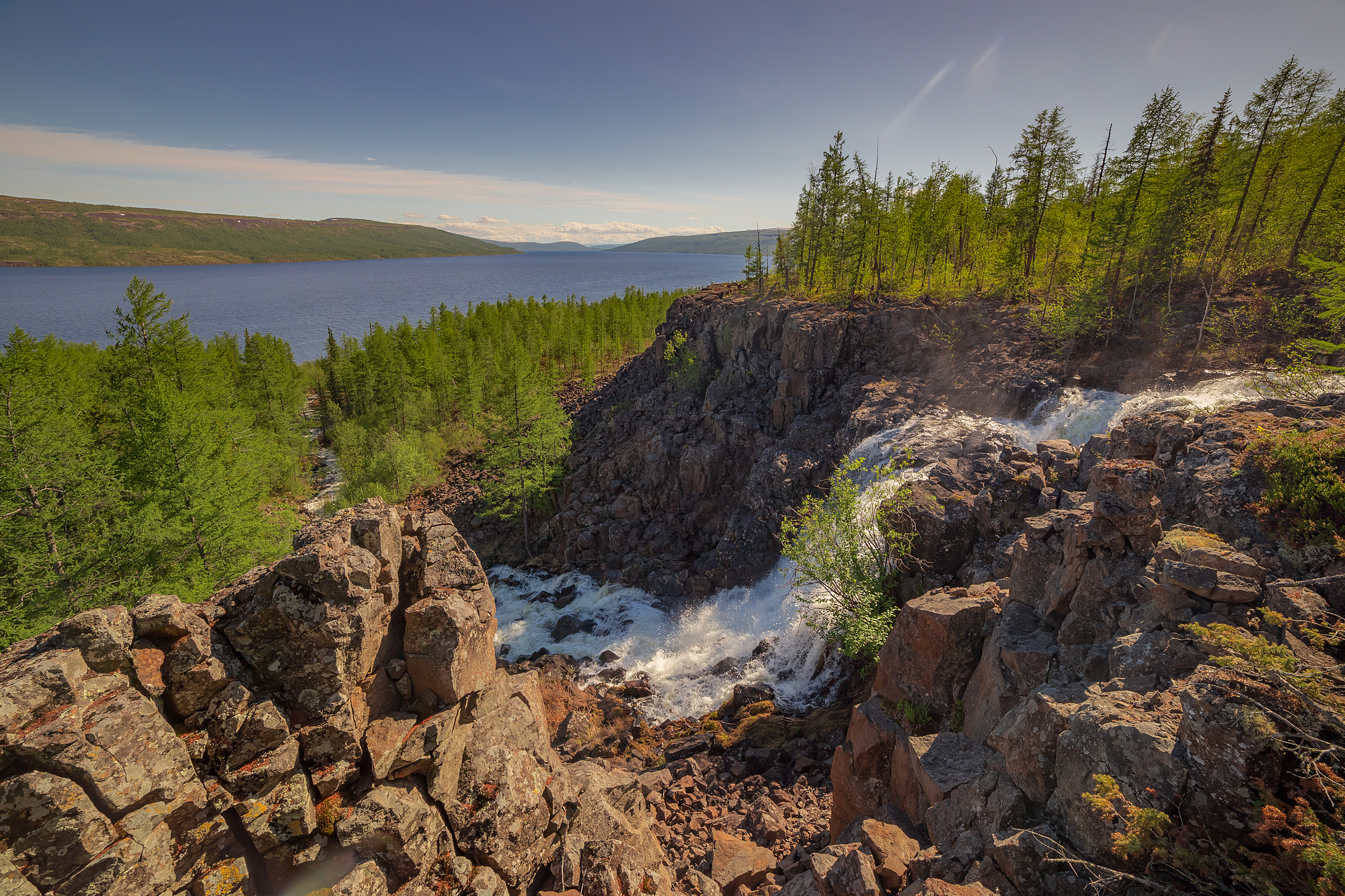

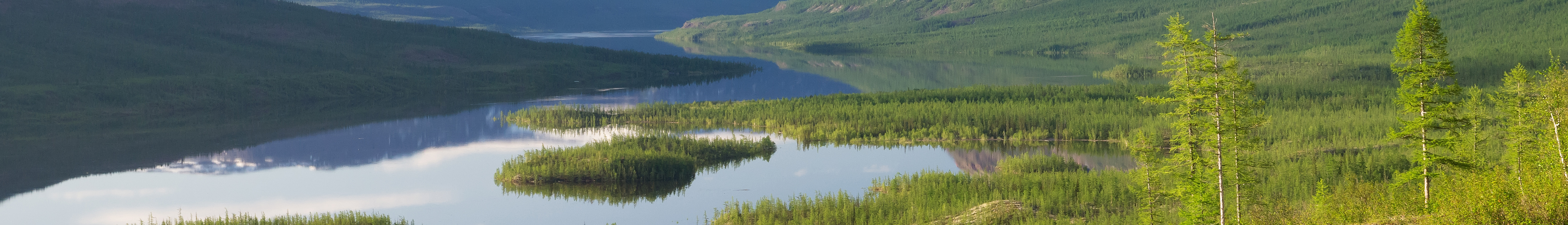

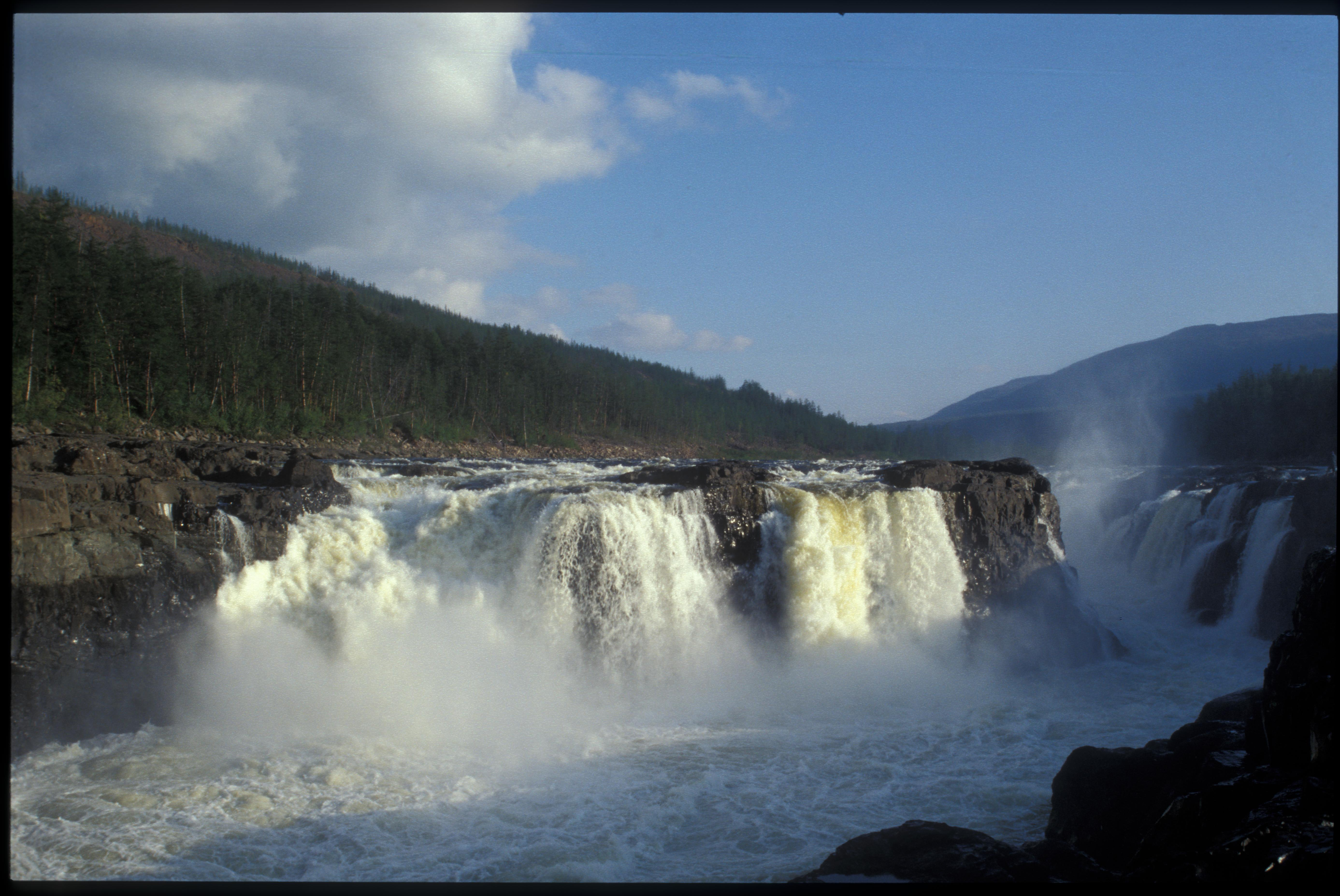

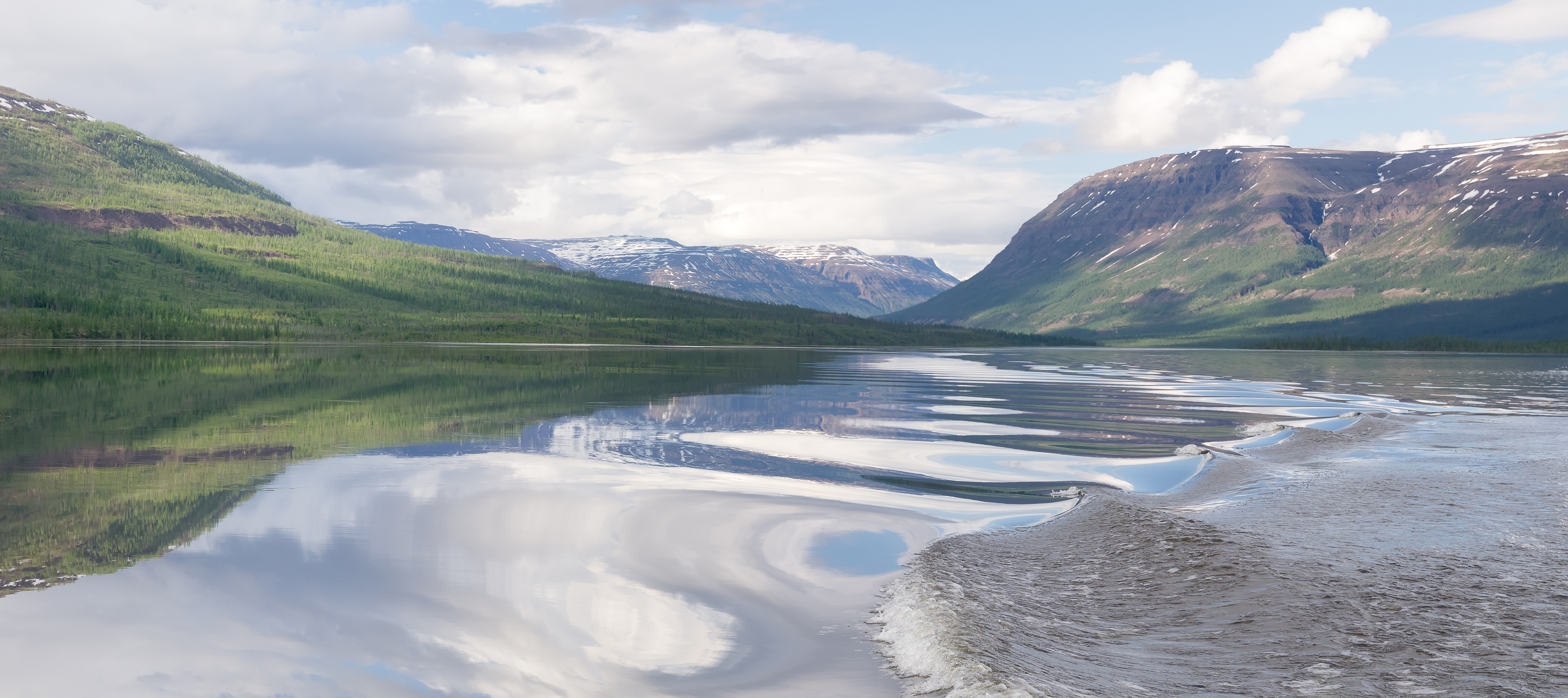

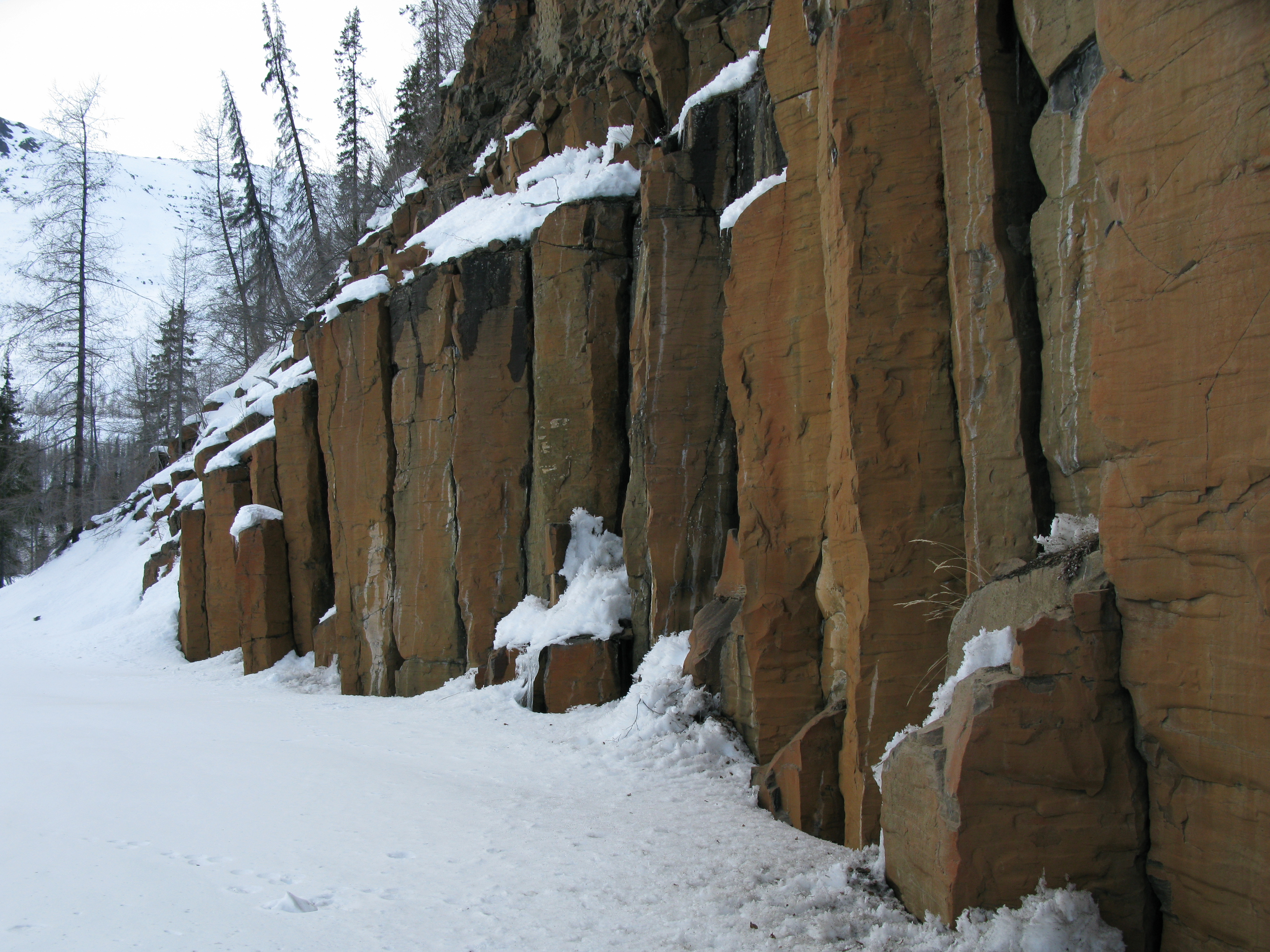

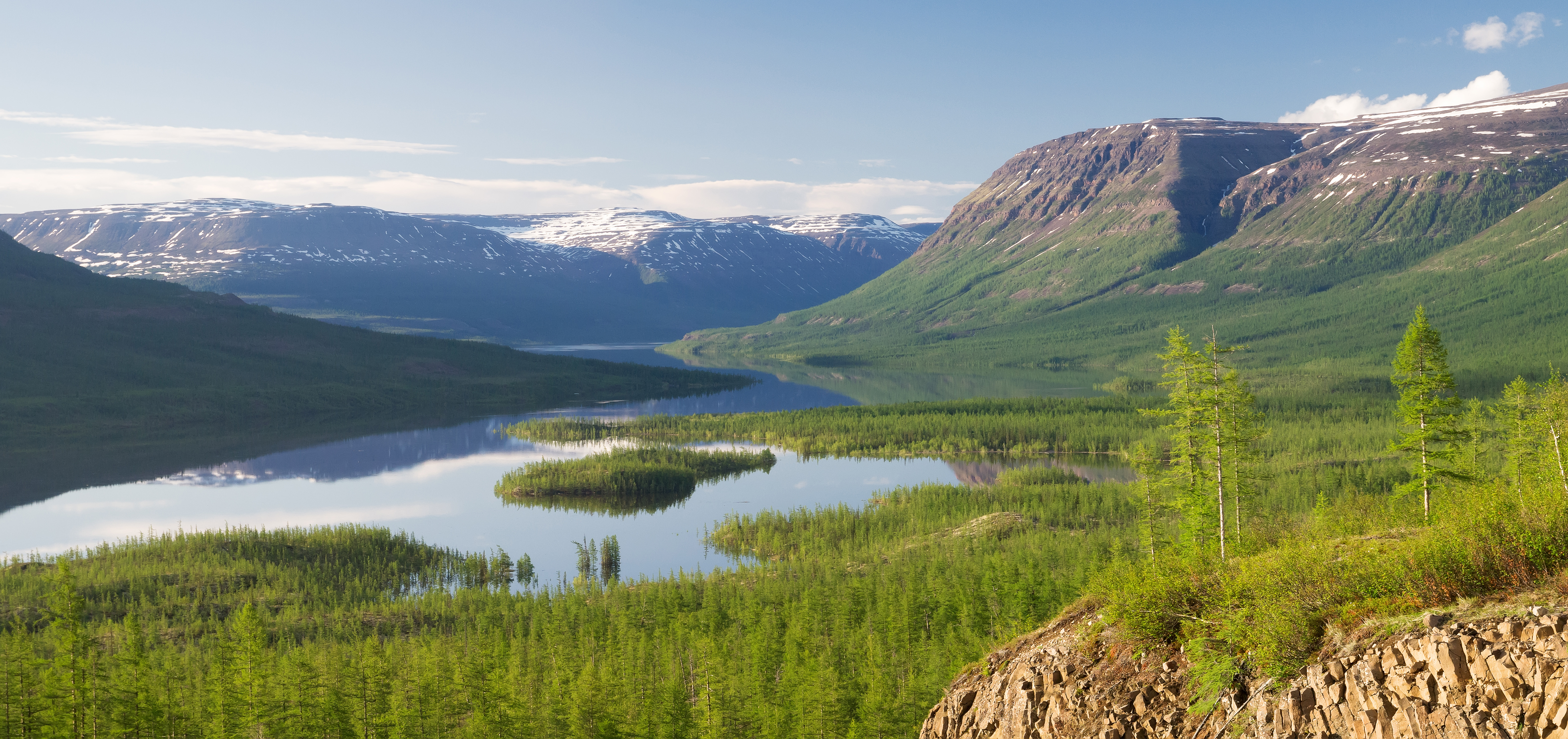

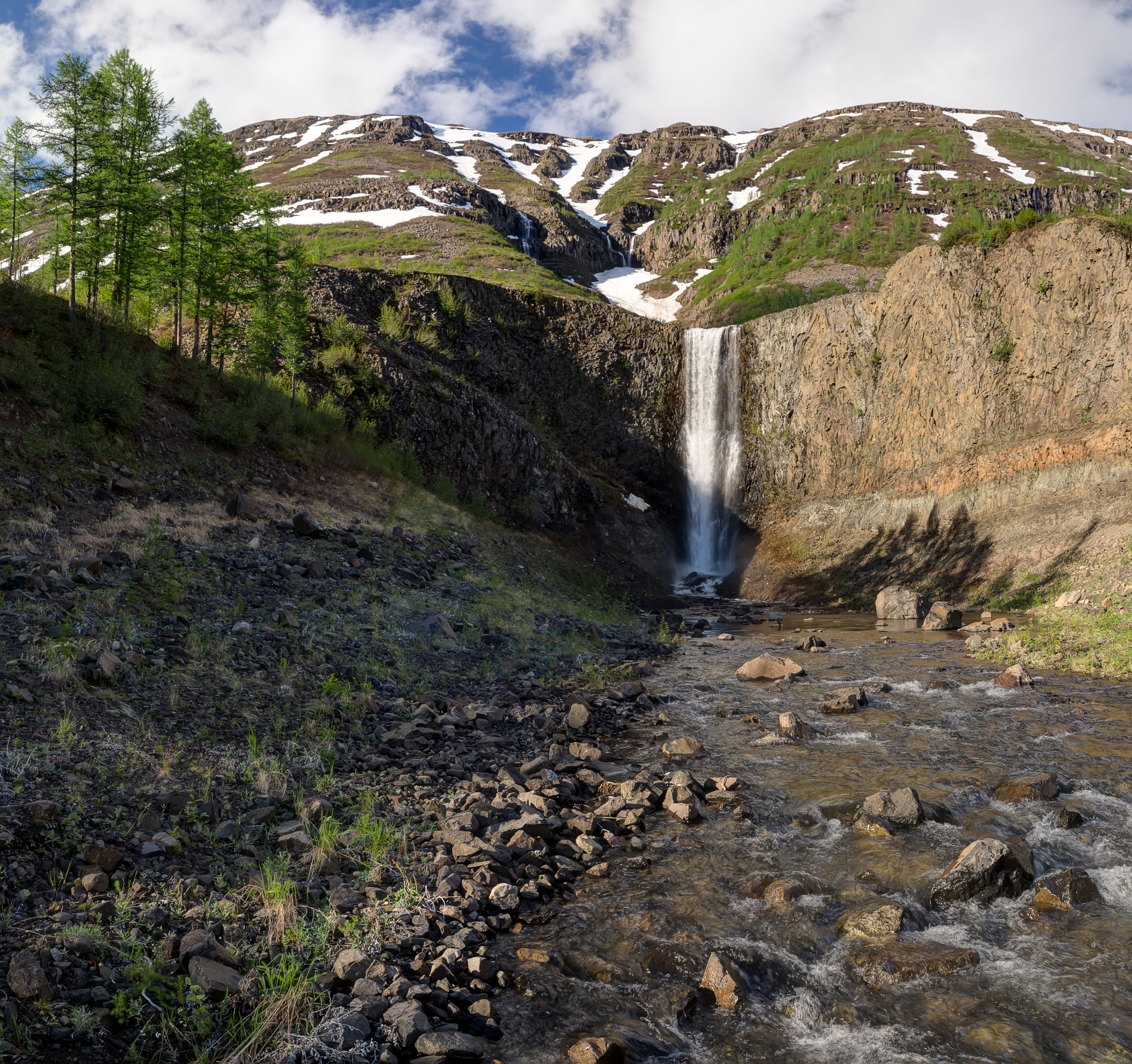
