= Central Siberian Plateau =

Plateau in North Asia

Central Siberian Plateau Среднесиби́рское плоского́рье
- Plateau
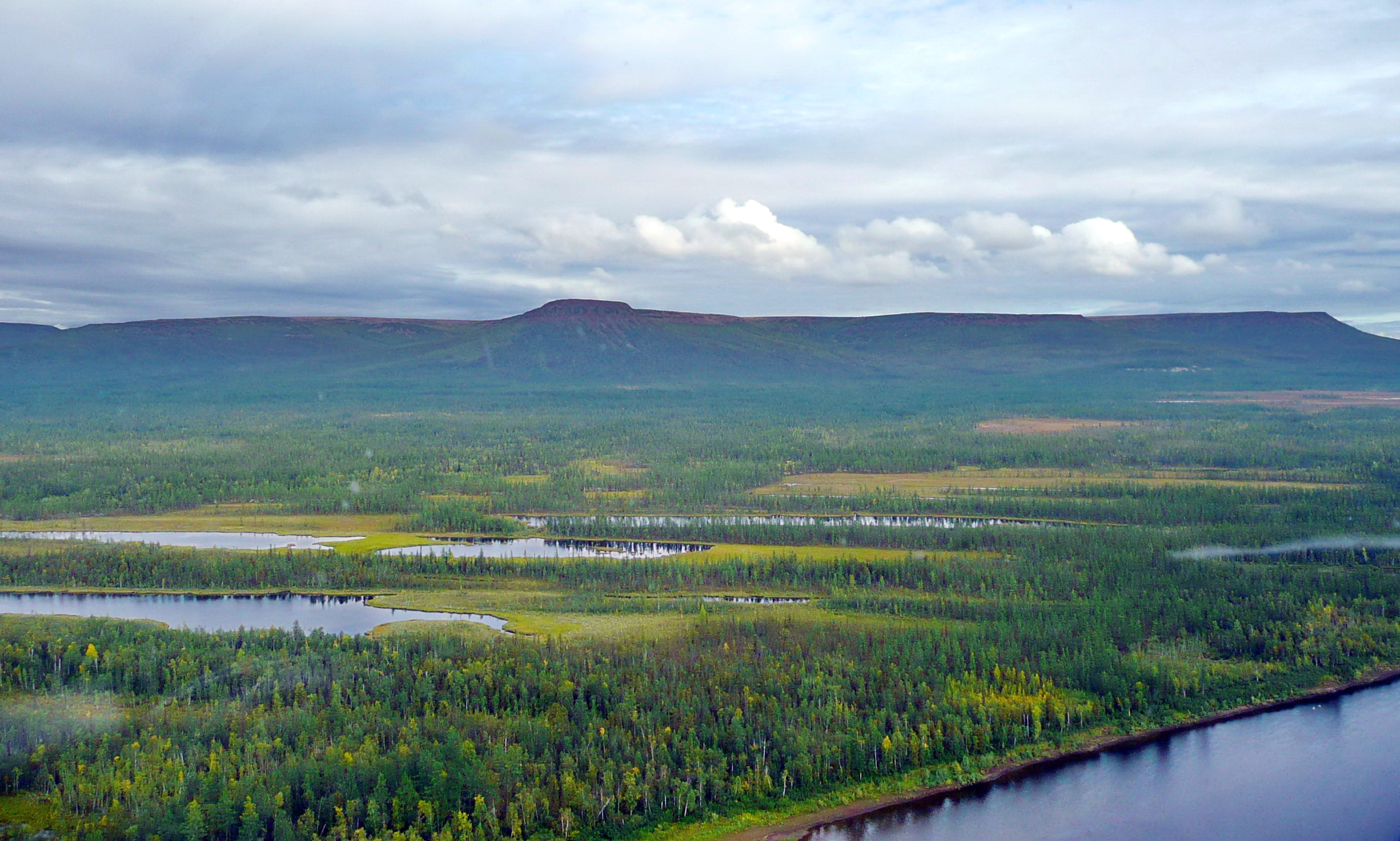
- View of the Lower Tunguska River on the Central Siberian Plateau

- Location within Russia
- Coordinates: 64°N 103°E
- Location: Krasnoyarsk Krai; Sakha Republic; Irkutsk Oblast
- Part of: Siberia

Area
  - Total: 3,500,000 km^{2} (1,400,000 sq mi)

Dimensions
  - Length: 2,000 kilometres (1,200 mi)
  - Width: 2,000 kilometres (1,200 mi)
- Elevation: 1,678 meters (5,505 ft) (highest)

The Central Siberian Plateau (Russian: Среднесибирское плоскогорье, romanized: Srednesibirskoye ploskogorye; Yakut: Орто Сибиир хаптал хайалаах сирэ, romanized: Orto Sibîr xaptal xayalâx sire) is a vast mountainous area in Siberia, one of the Great Russian Regions.

== Geography ==
The plateau occupies a great part of central Siberia between the Yenisei and Lena rivers. It is located in the Siberian Platform and extends over an area of 3,500,000 km^{2} (1,400,000 sq mi), between the Yenisei in the west and the Central Yakutian Lowland in the east. To the south, it is bound by the Altai Mountains, Salair Ridge, Kuznetsk Alatau, Eastern and Western Sayan Mountains and other mountains of Tuva, as well as the North Baikal Highlands and Baikal Mountains. To the north of the plateau lies the North Siberian Lowland, and to the east the plateau gives way to the Central Yakutian Lowland and the Lena Plateau.

The surface of the Central Siberian Plateau is characterized by the alternation of wide plateaus and ridges, some of the latter sharply jagged. The Central Siberian Plateau covers one third of Siberia.

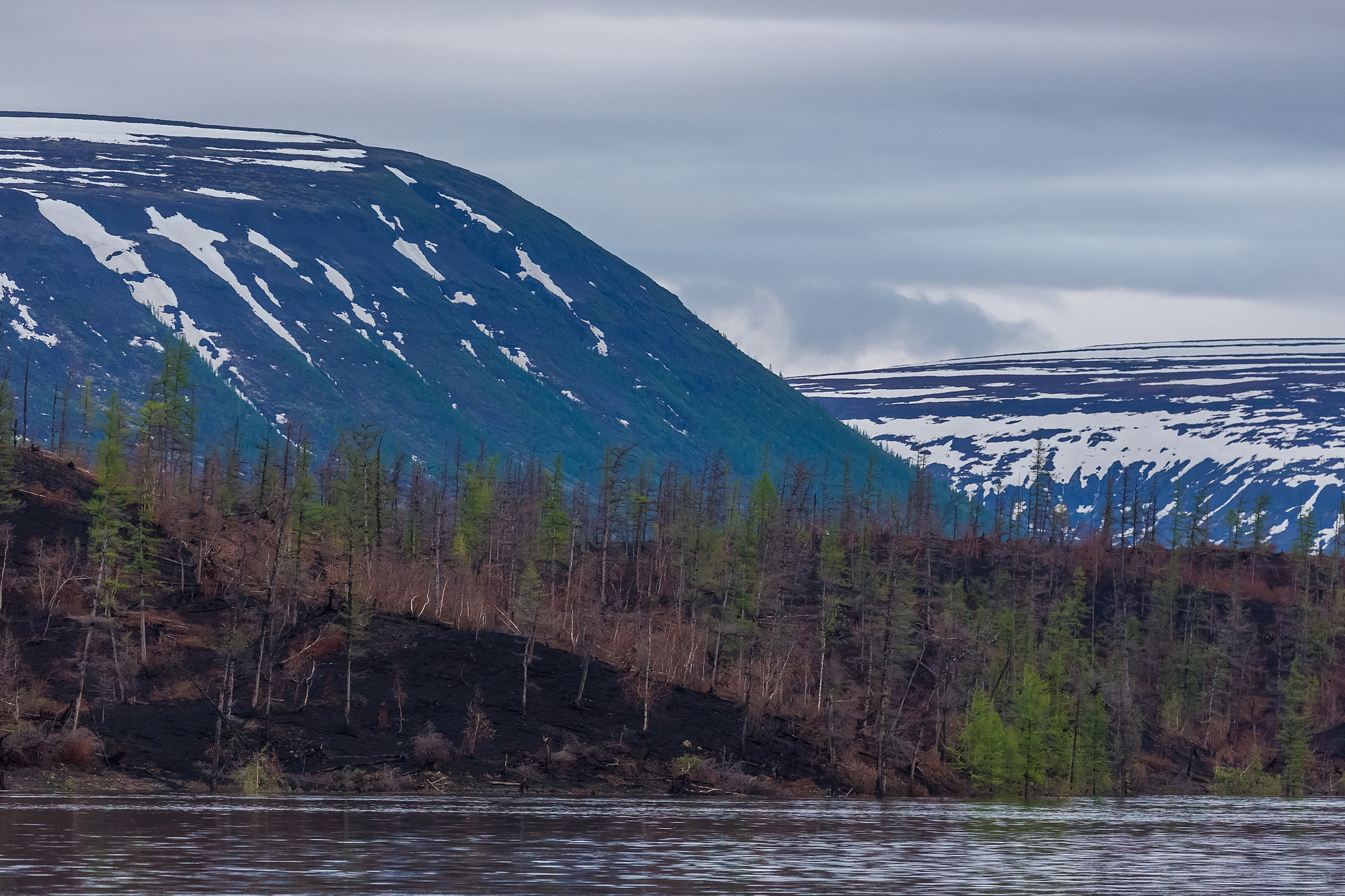
Landscape of the Putorana Nature Reserve.

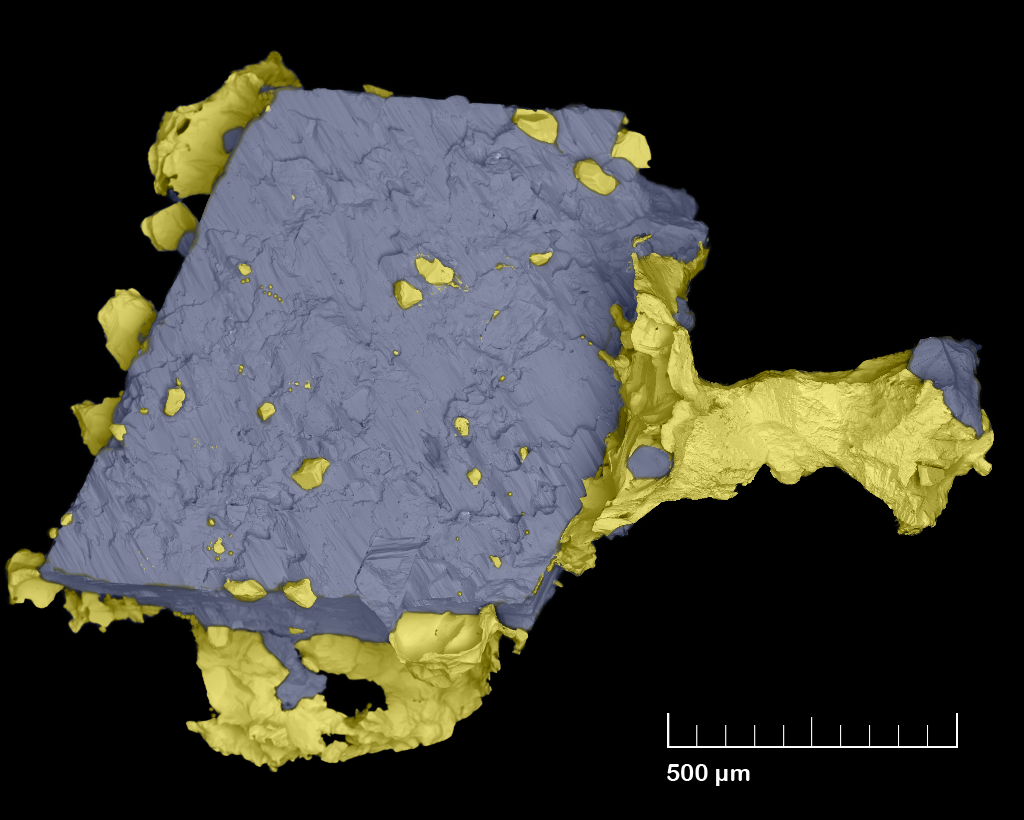
Gold on arsenopyrite as found in the Yenisei Range.

=== Subplateaus and subranges ===
The system of the Central Siberian Plateau comprises a number of smaller plateaus and subranges, including, among others, the following:

- Putorana Plateau, the northwesternmost, highest point Mount Kamen (highest of the plateau system) 1,678 metres (5,505 ft)
- Anabar Plateau at the northern end, highest point 905 m (2,969 ft)
- Vilyuy Plateau, highest point 962 m (3,156 ft)
- Syverma Plateau, highest point Nakson, 1,035 metres (3,396 ft)
- Tunguska Plateau, highest point 866 m (2,841 ft)
- Lena Plateau, highest point 700 m (2,300 ft)
- Lena-Angara Plateau, highest point Namai, 1,509 metres (4,951 ft)
- Yenisei Range, highest point 1,125 m (3,691 ft)
- Angara Range, highest point 1,022 m (3,353 ft)

== Climate ==
The climate is continental with short warm summers and long and severely cold winters. Most of the territory is covered with conifer forests (larch is especially abundant). The plateau's major river is the Lower Tunguska. Known geologically as the Siberian Traps, mineral resources here are very rich and include coal, iron ore, gold, platinum, diamonds and natural gas.

== See also ==
- Economy of Russia — Natural resources
- South Siberian Mountains
- Tunguska event
- Udachnaya pipe
