= Lake Lama =

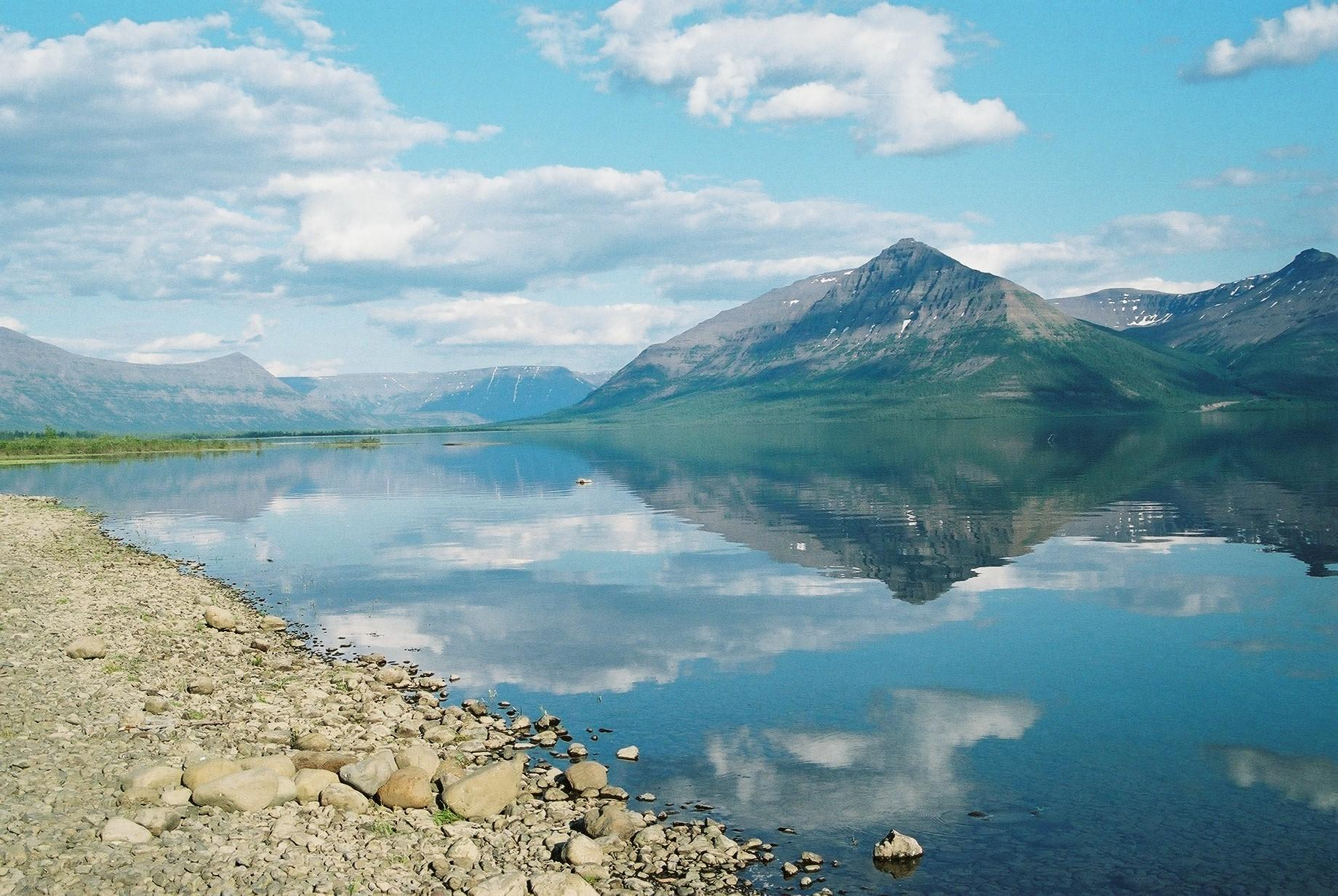
- Panorama of the lake

- Location in Russia Lake Lama (Krasnoyarsk Krai)
- Location: Krasnoyarsk Krai
- Coordinates: 69.5172222°N 90.625°E
- Type: freshwater lake
- Primary inflows: Lama River
- Primary outflows: Lama
- Catchment area: 5,900 km^{2} (2,300 sq mi)
- Basin countries: Russia
- Max. length: 80 km (50 mi)
- Max. width: 7 km (4.3 mi)
- Surface area: 318 or 460 km^{2} (123 or 178 sq mi)
- Average depth: 300 m (980 ft)
- Max. depth: 600 m (2,000 ft)
- Shore length^{1}: 191 km (125 mi)
- Surface elevation: 45 m (148 ft)
- Islands: around 20-30
- Settlements: Only resorts and campsites
- ^{1} Shore length is not a well-defined measure.

Lake Lama (Russian: Лама) is a large freshwater lake (of tectonic origin) in Krasnoyarsk Krai, north-central part of Russia.

== Geography ==
Lake Lama is located in the Putorana Plateau area at 69.5172222°N 90.625°E, 140 km east off the city of Norilsk, and has an area of 318 km² (other sources state 460 km²). It is 80 km long and up to 8 km wide with a depth ranging from 300 to 600 m. Lake Lama is connected with Lake Melkoye ("Lake Shallow") by the Lama River (Putorana).

The lake was surveyed and described for the first time by Russian scientist Nikolay Urvantsev and his colleague Bazanov during an expedition in 1921.

== Origin of the name ==
The hydronym Lama comes from Tungusic word laamu where it means sea, ocean, big water.

There was no lake named Lama on the map of Russian Asia published in 1911 by the Chief Directorate of the General Staff of the Russian Empire. The lake was pictured very approximately and was named Davydovo.

Views of the lake
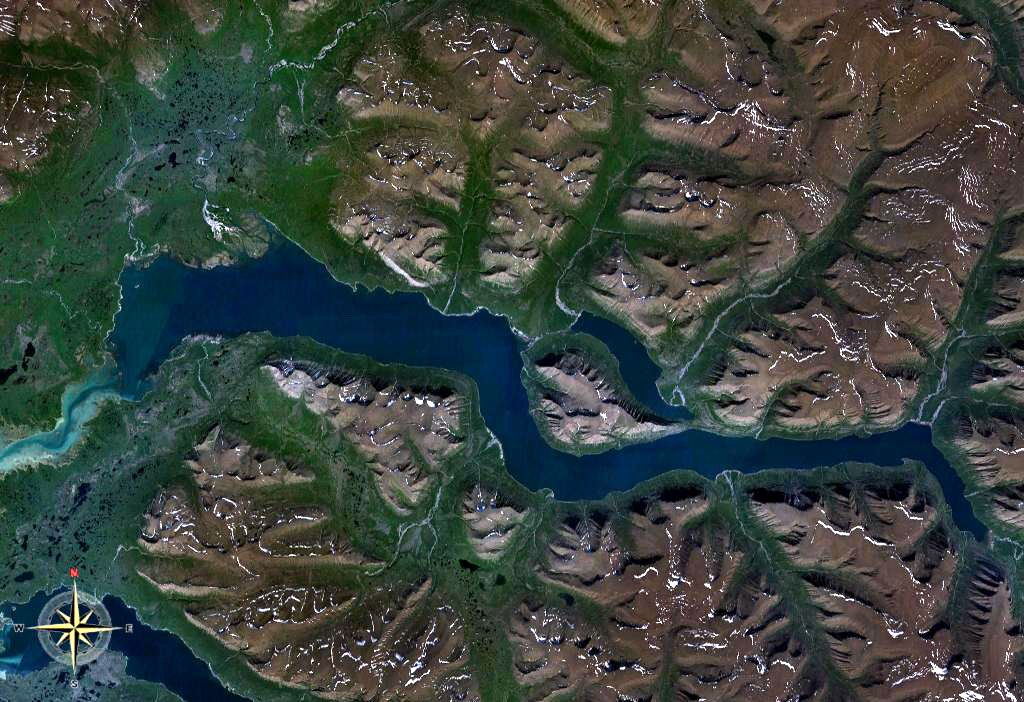
NASA satellite picture

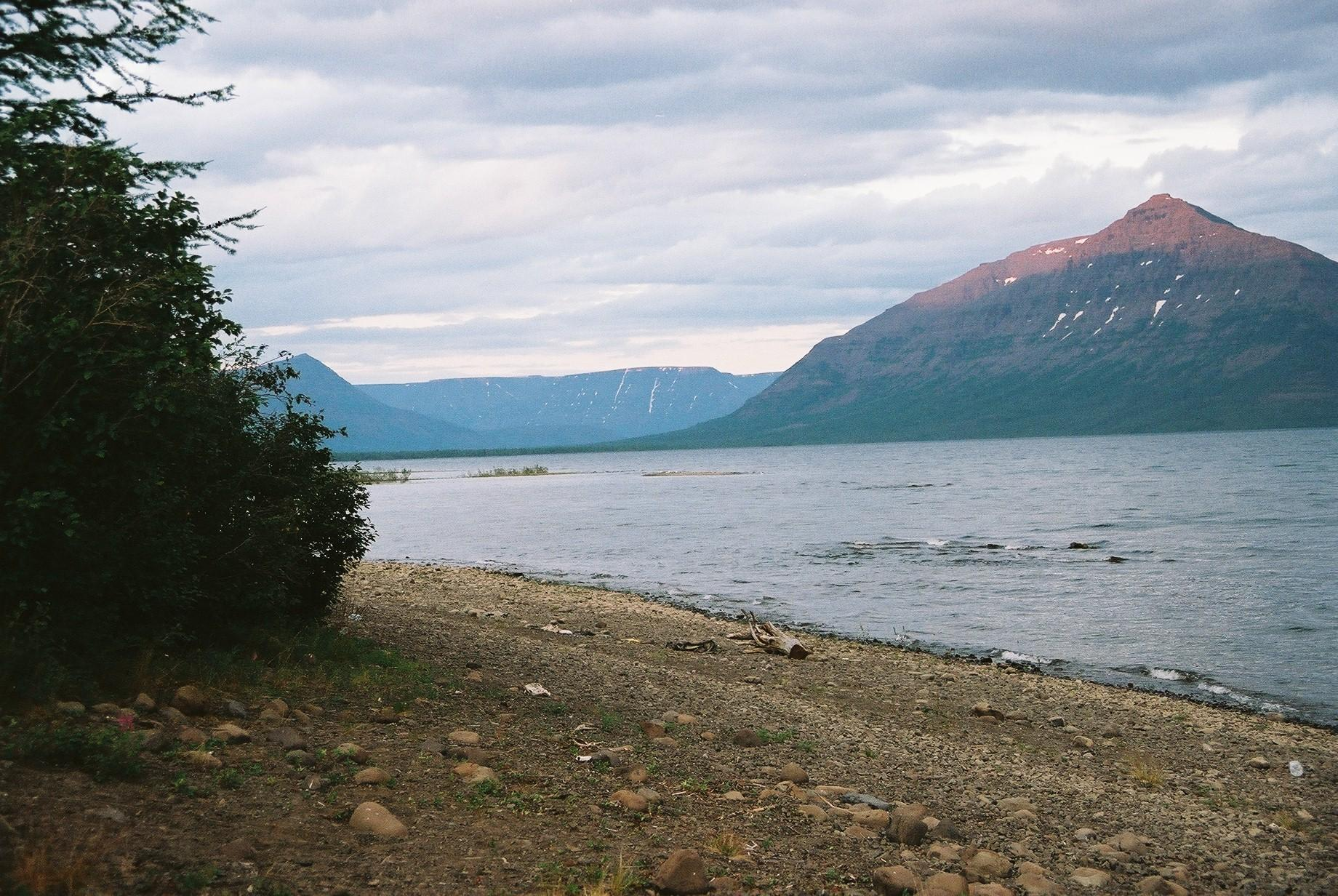
View of the lake by day

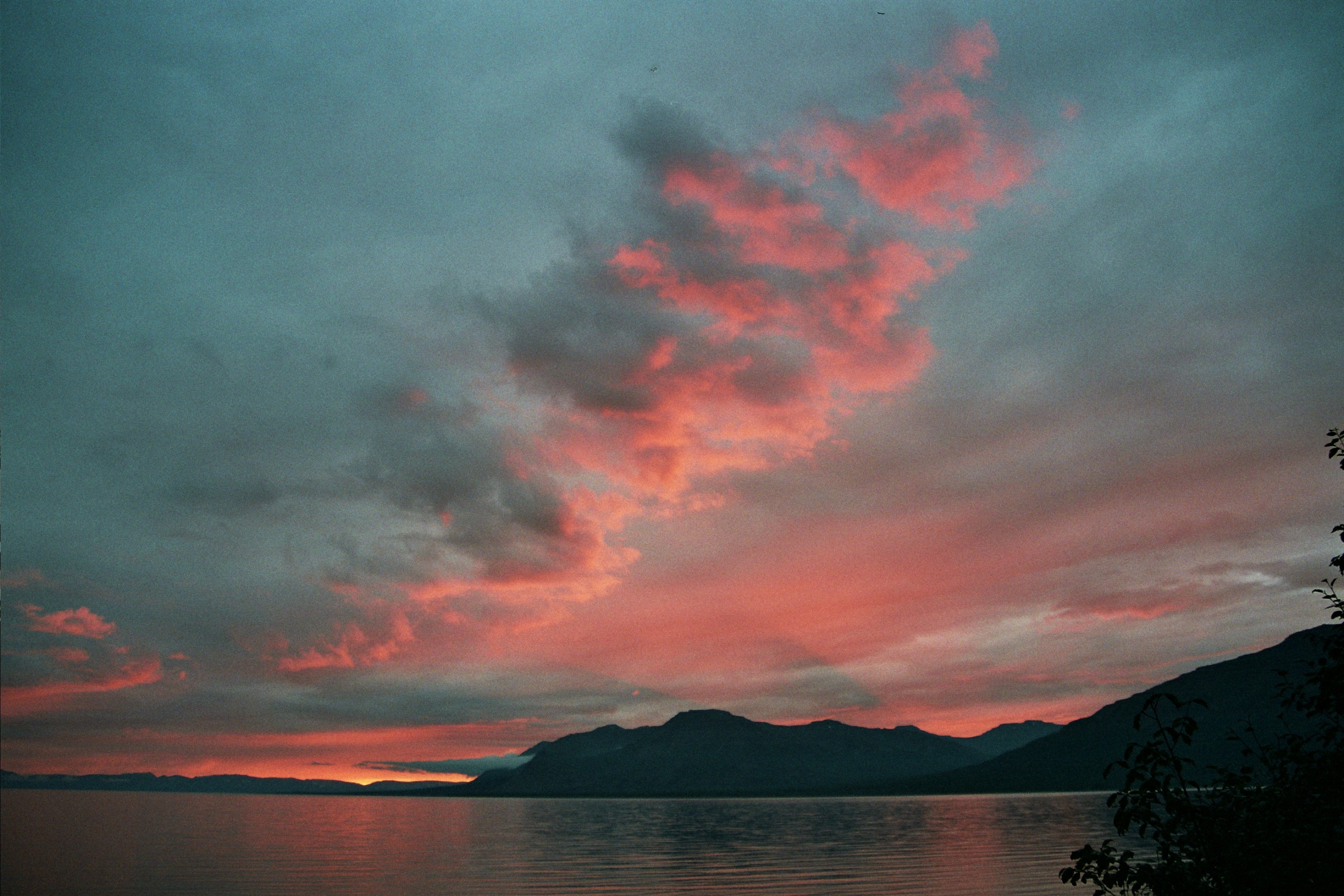
The lake at dusk

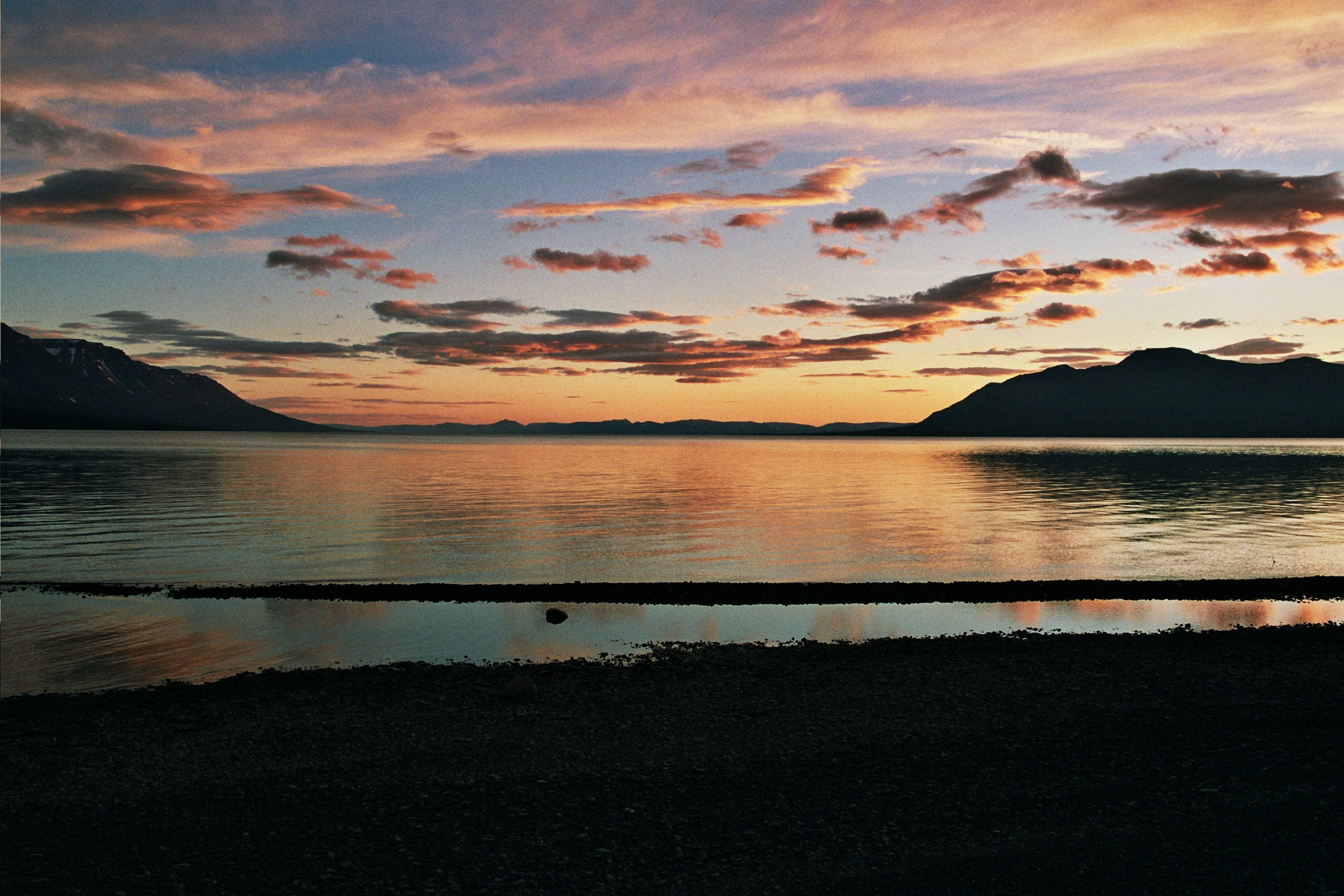
Sunset over the lake

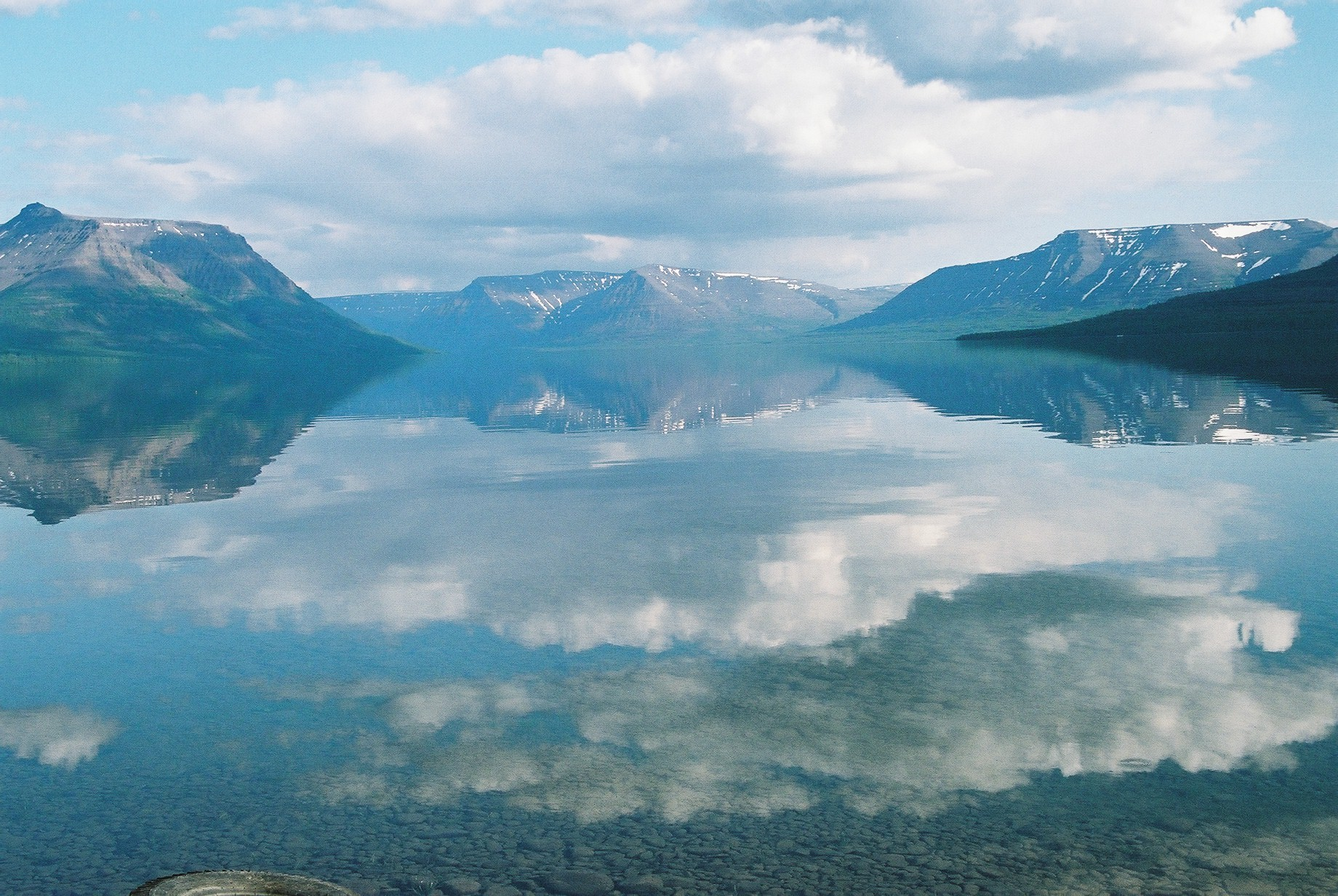
The quiet waters of the lake

== See also ==
- List of lakes of Russia
