= Great Russian Regions =

Geomorphological regions of Russia

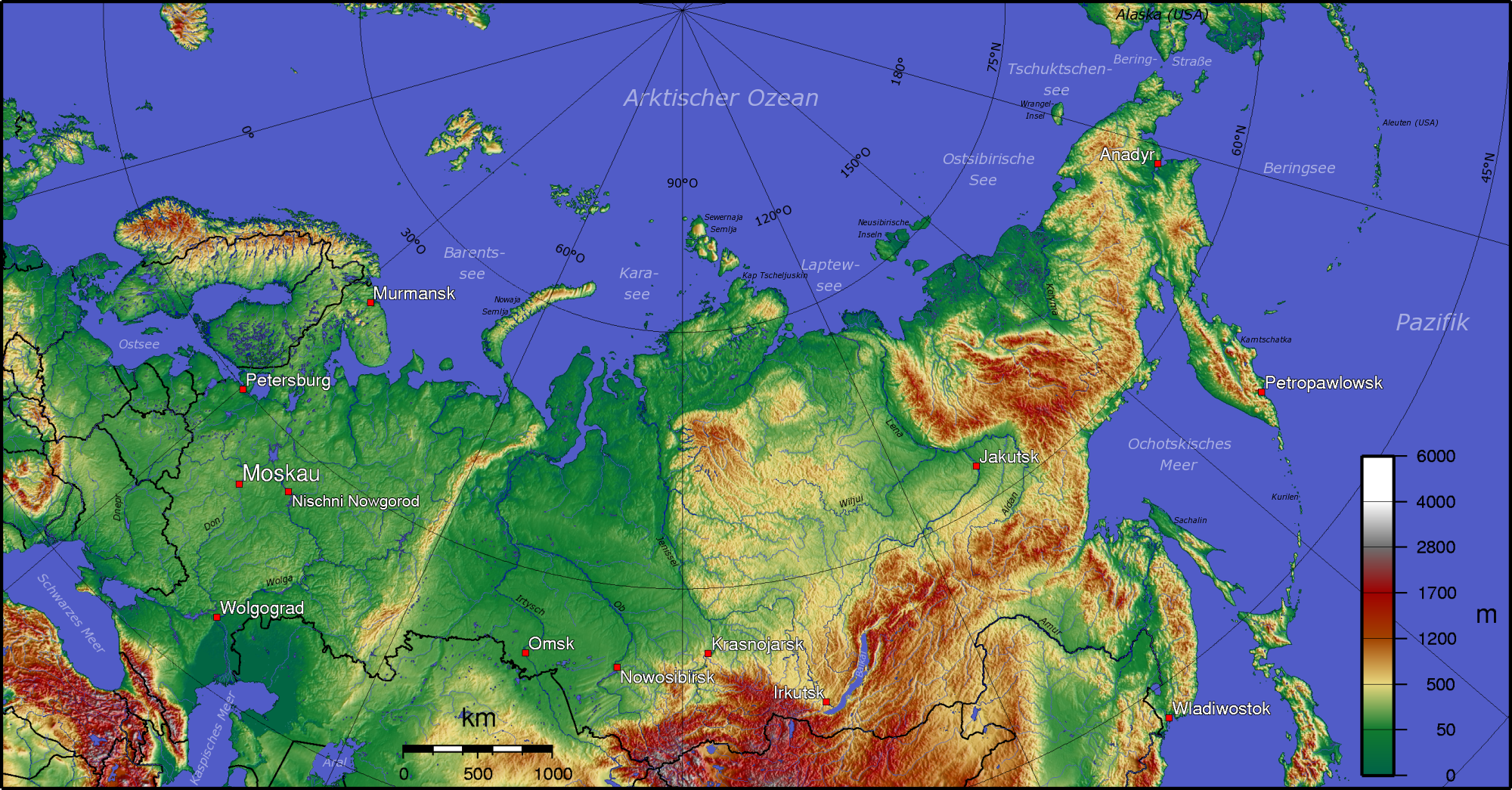
Topographic map of Russia

The Great Russian Regions are eight geomorphological regions of the Russian Federation displaying characteristic forms of relief. Seven of them are parts of Siberia, located east of the Ural Mountains.

== Geography ==
- Central Siberian Plateau, a large elevated zone between the Yenisei and Lena rivers composed of various plateaus (Putorana Plateau, Anabar Plateau, Vilyuy Plateau, and Lena Plateau among others) deeply dissected by river valleys. Area 3,500,000 km^{2} (1,400,000 sq mi).
- Central Yakutian Lowland, the alluvial plain of the middle Lena River separating the Central Siberian Plateau to the west and the East Siberian Mountains to the east. Area 300,000 km^{2} (120,000 sq mi).
- East European Plain, a very large area that comprises the plains and depressions west and southwest of the Urals crossed by numerous large rivers, such as the Volga, Dnieper, Don and Pechora. Area approximately 4,000,000 km^{2} (1,500,000 sq mi).
- East Siberian Lowland, a vast alluvial plain, swampy and dotted with thousands of lakes. The region includes the Yana-Indigirka, Kolyma and Aby lowlands, as well as the New Siberian Islands. Area about 1,100,000 km^{2} (420,000 sq mi).
- East Siberian Mountains, a large mountainous area located in northeastern Siberia. It includes two large mountain systems, the Verkhoyansk Range and the Chersky Range, as well as other minor ones. To the east it reaches Cape Dezhnyov in the Bering Strait. Area approximately 2,000,000 km^{2} (770,000 sq mi).
- North Siberian Lowland, a plain with a relatively flat relief separating the Byrranga Mountains of the Taymyr Peninsula in the north from the Central Siberian Plateau in the south. Area approximately 400,000 km^{2} (150,000 sq mi).
- South Siberian Mountains, stretching roughly from east to west in the Siberian and Far Eastern Federal Districts of Russia, as well as partly in Mongolia. Area approximately 1,500,000 km^{2} (580,000 sq mi).
- West Siberian Plain, large alluvial plain between the Urals to the west and the Yenisei River to the east, beyond which rises the Central Siberian Plateau. The lowland is bound by the coast of the Kara Sea to the north and by the foothills of the Altai Mountains to the southeast. The southern end extends into Kazakhstan. Area 2,600,000 km^{2} (1,000,000 sq mi).

=== Landscapes ===
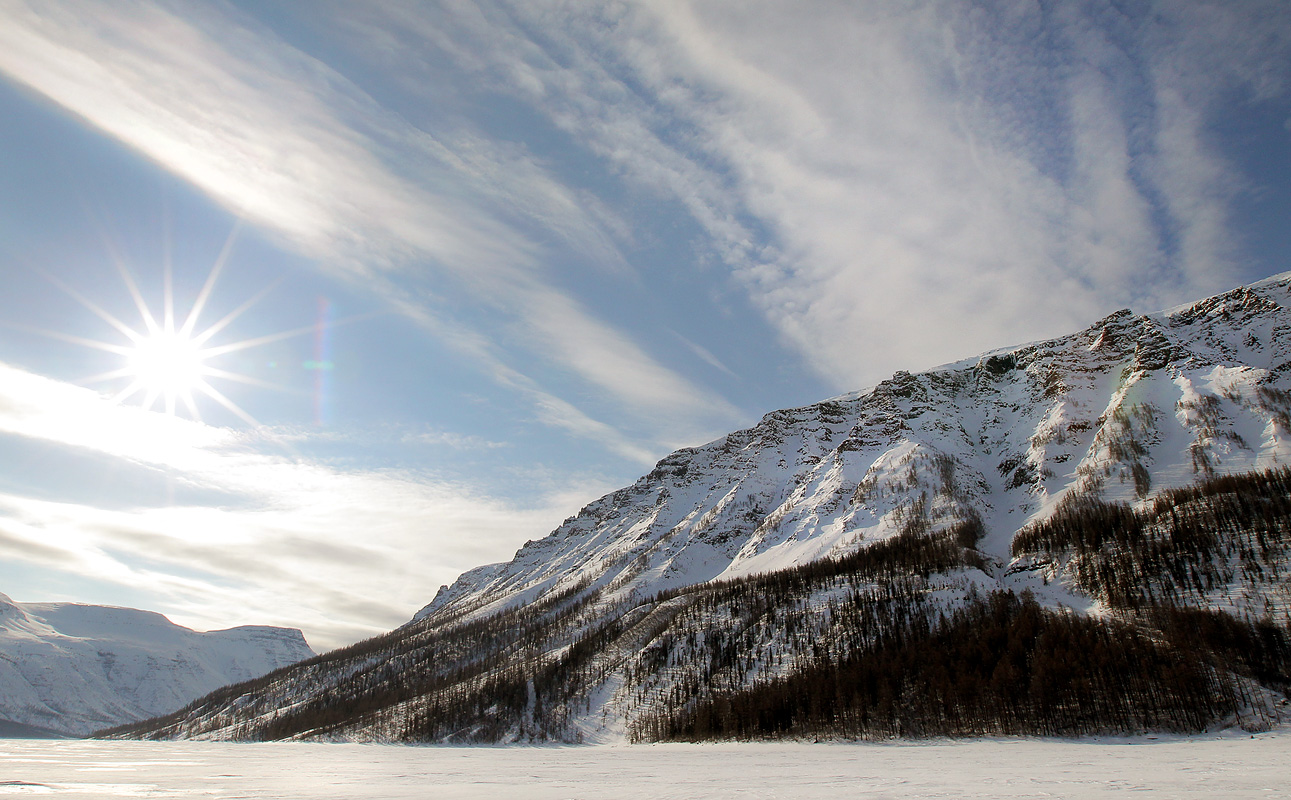
Central Siberian Plateau, Putorana Mountains.

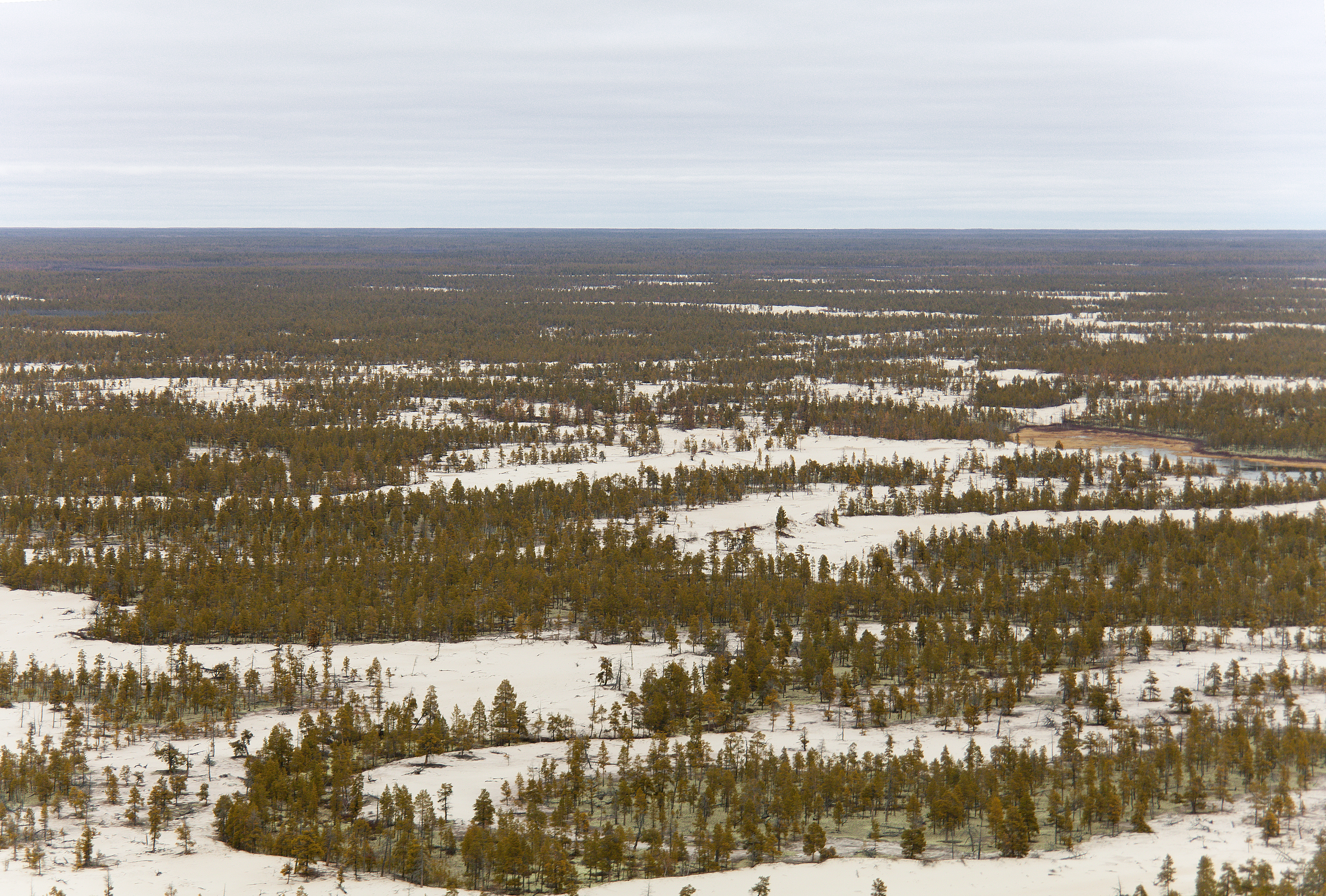
Central Yakutian Lowland, Tukulan area in the taiga.

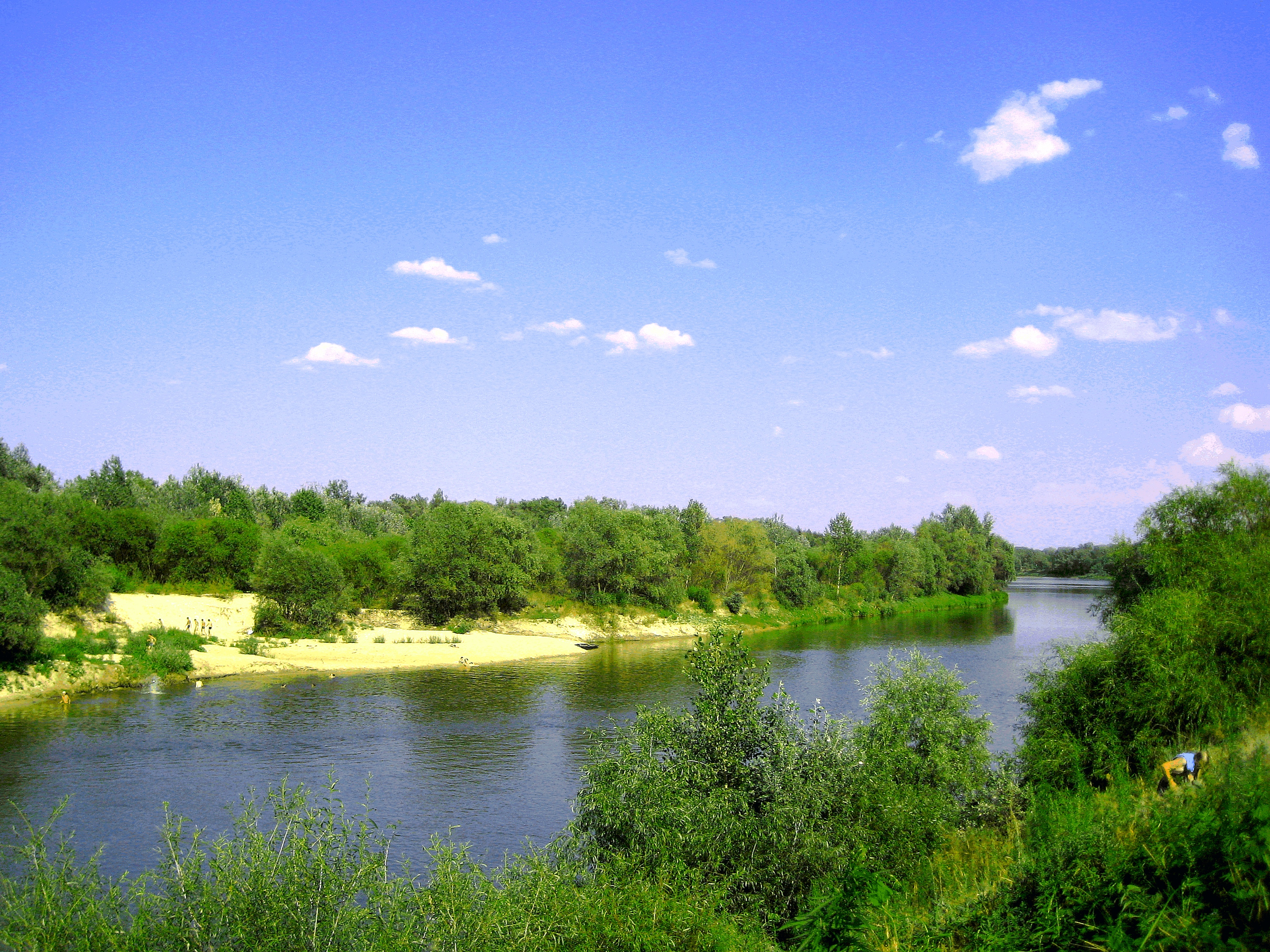
East European Plain, Khopyor River near Novokhopersk.

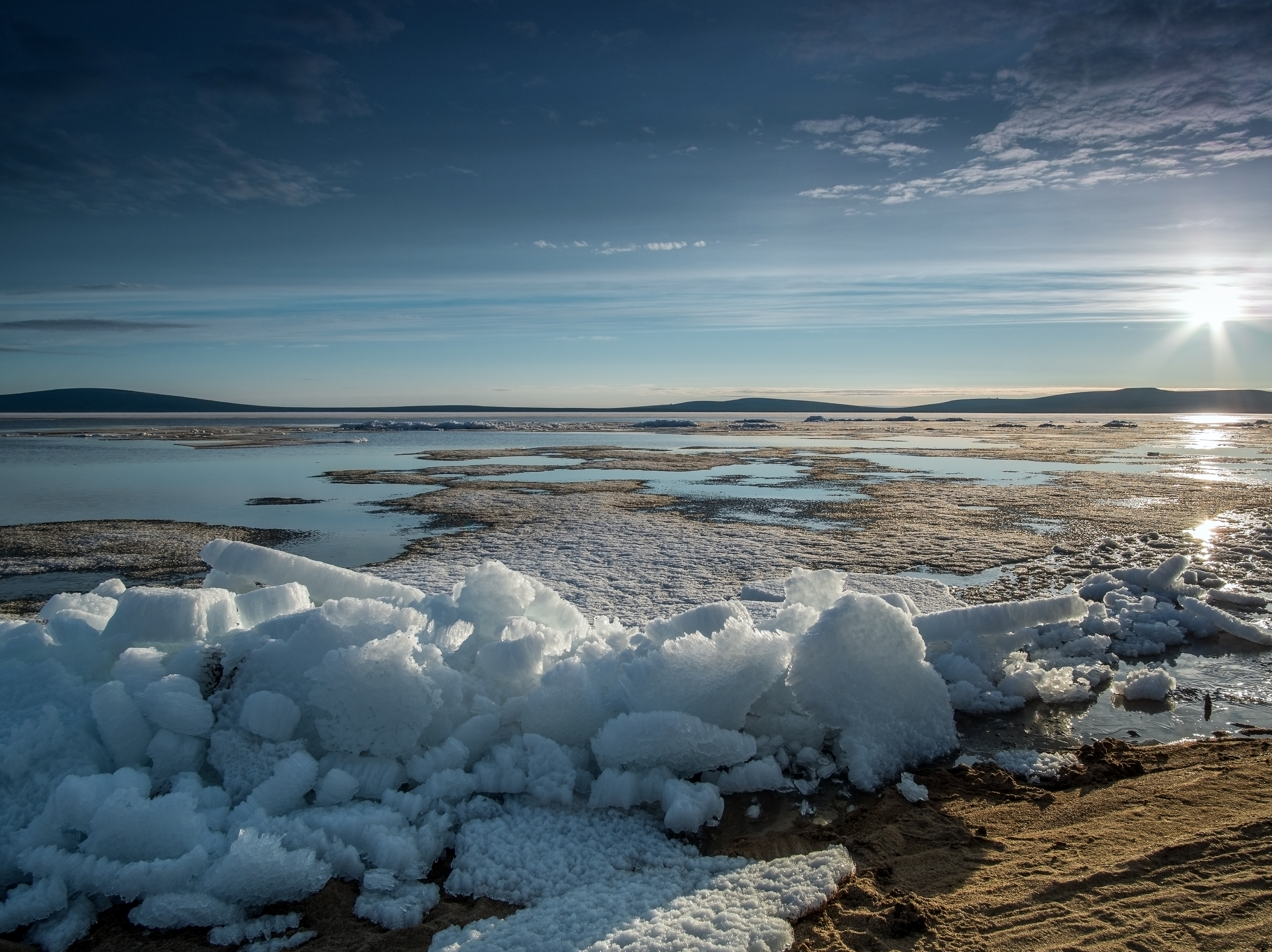
East Siberian Lowland, Lake Ozhogino.

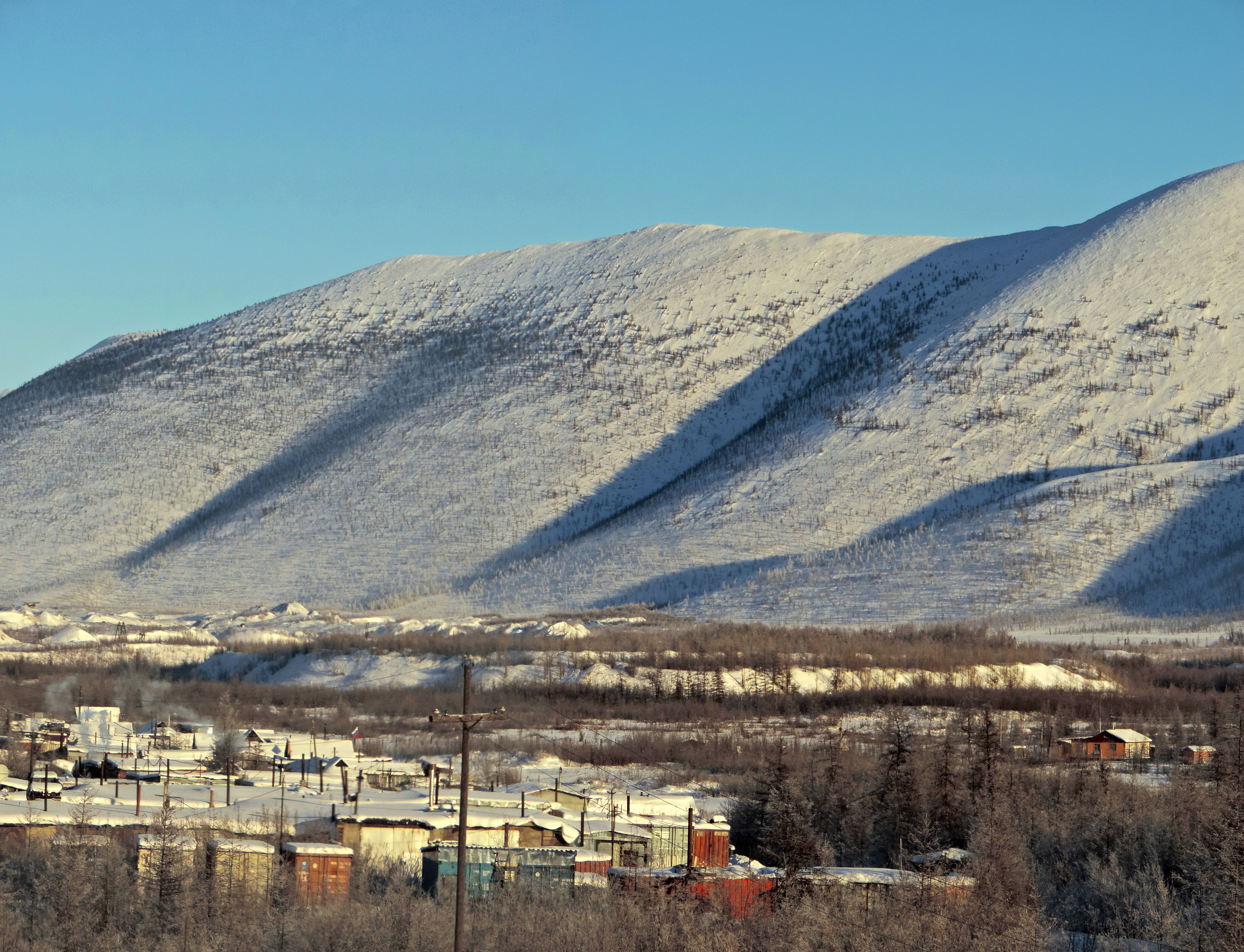
East Siberian Mountains, view of Bilibino.

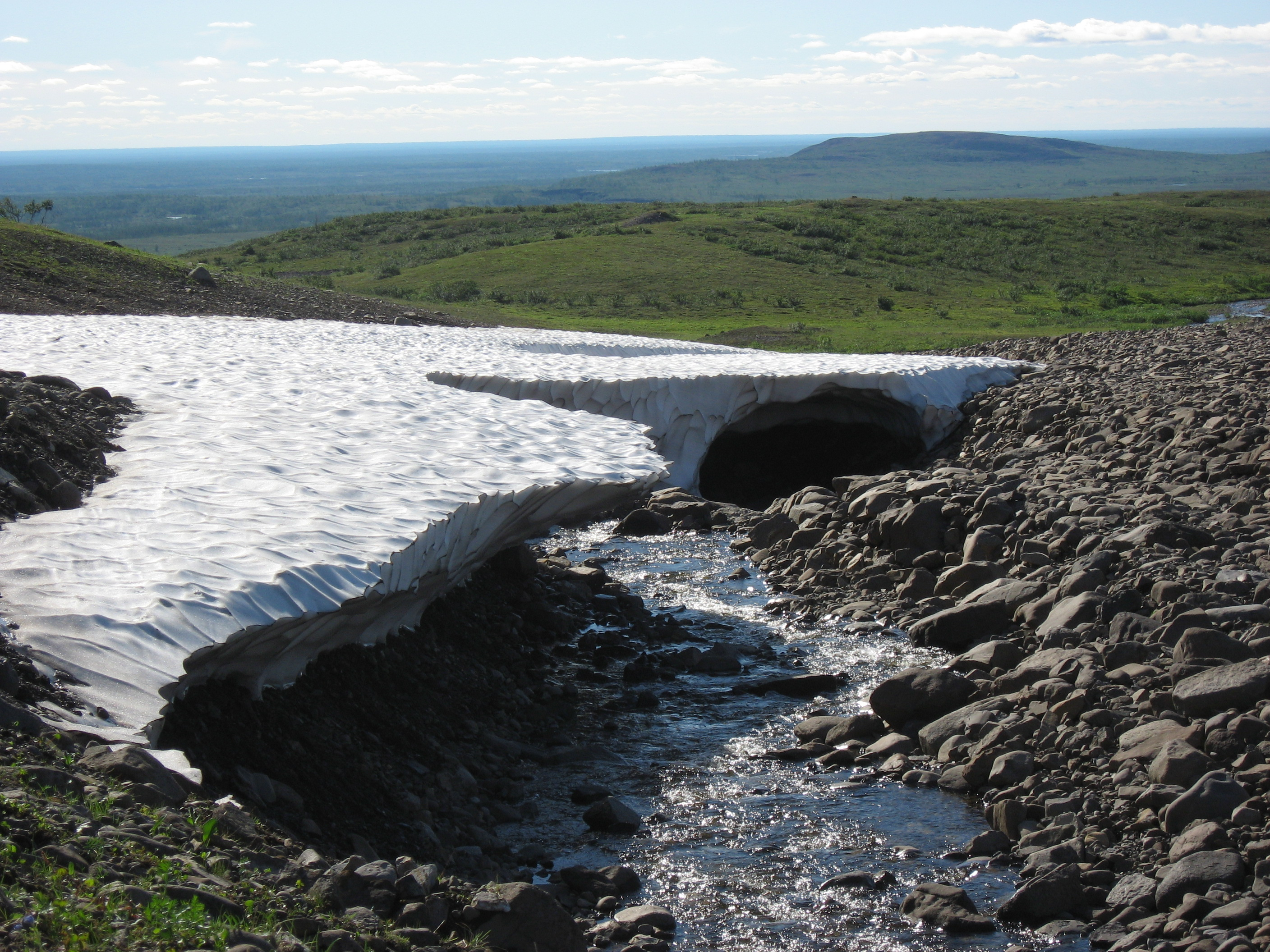
North Siberian Lowland, tundra and snowfield in Taymyr Dolgano-Nenets District.

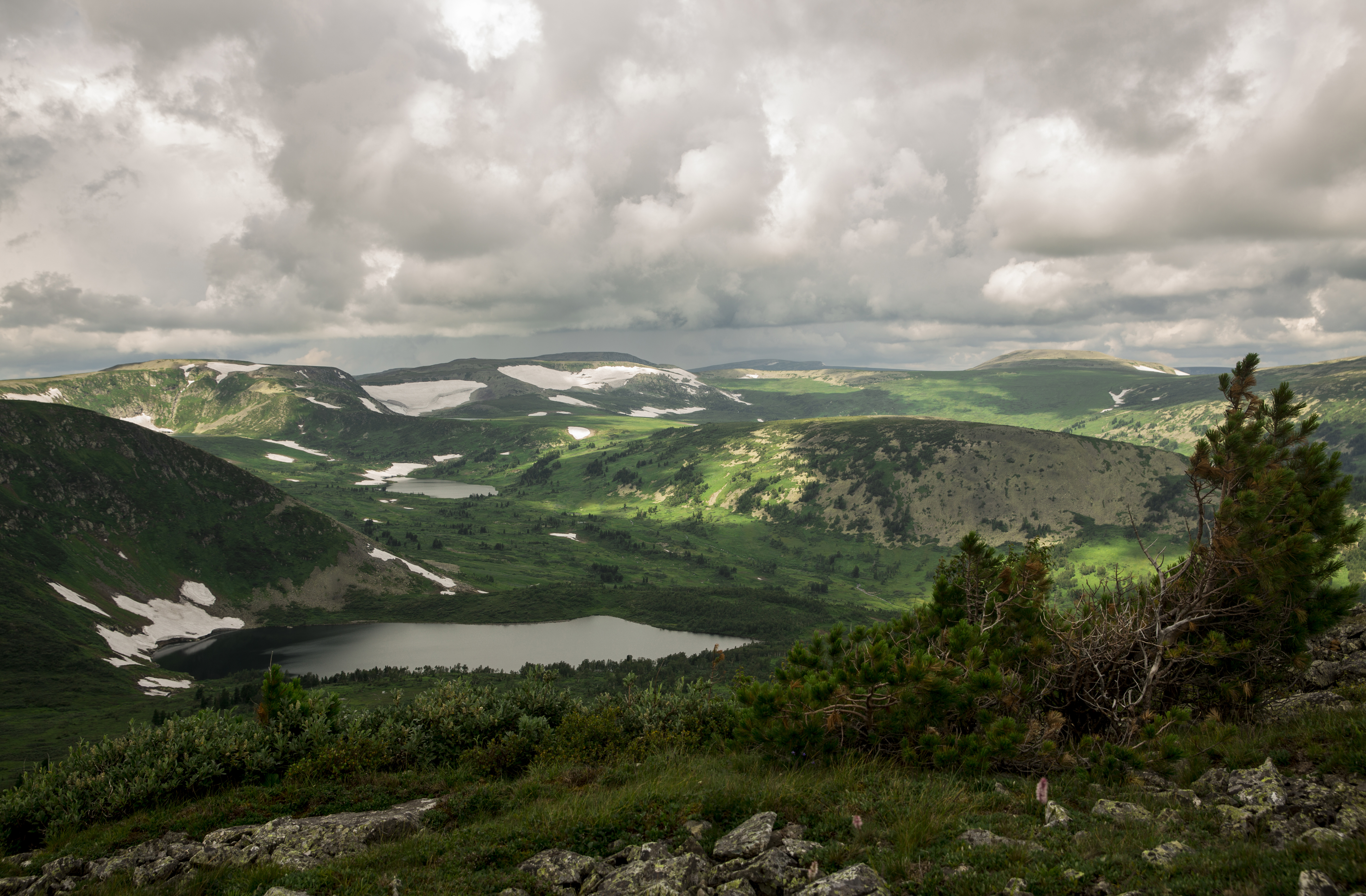
South Siberian Mountains, Kuznetsk Alatau.

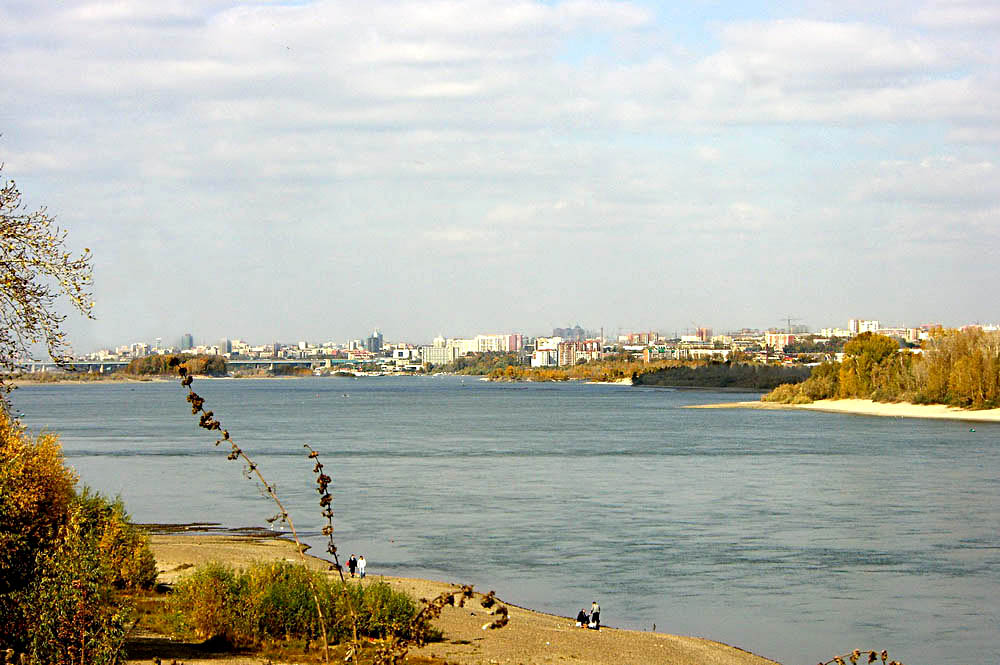
West Siberian Lowland, the Ob by Novosibirsk.

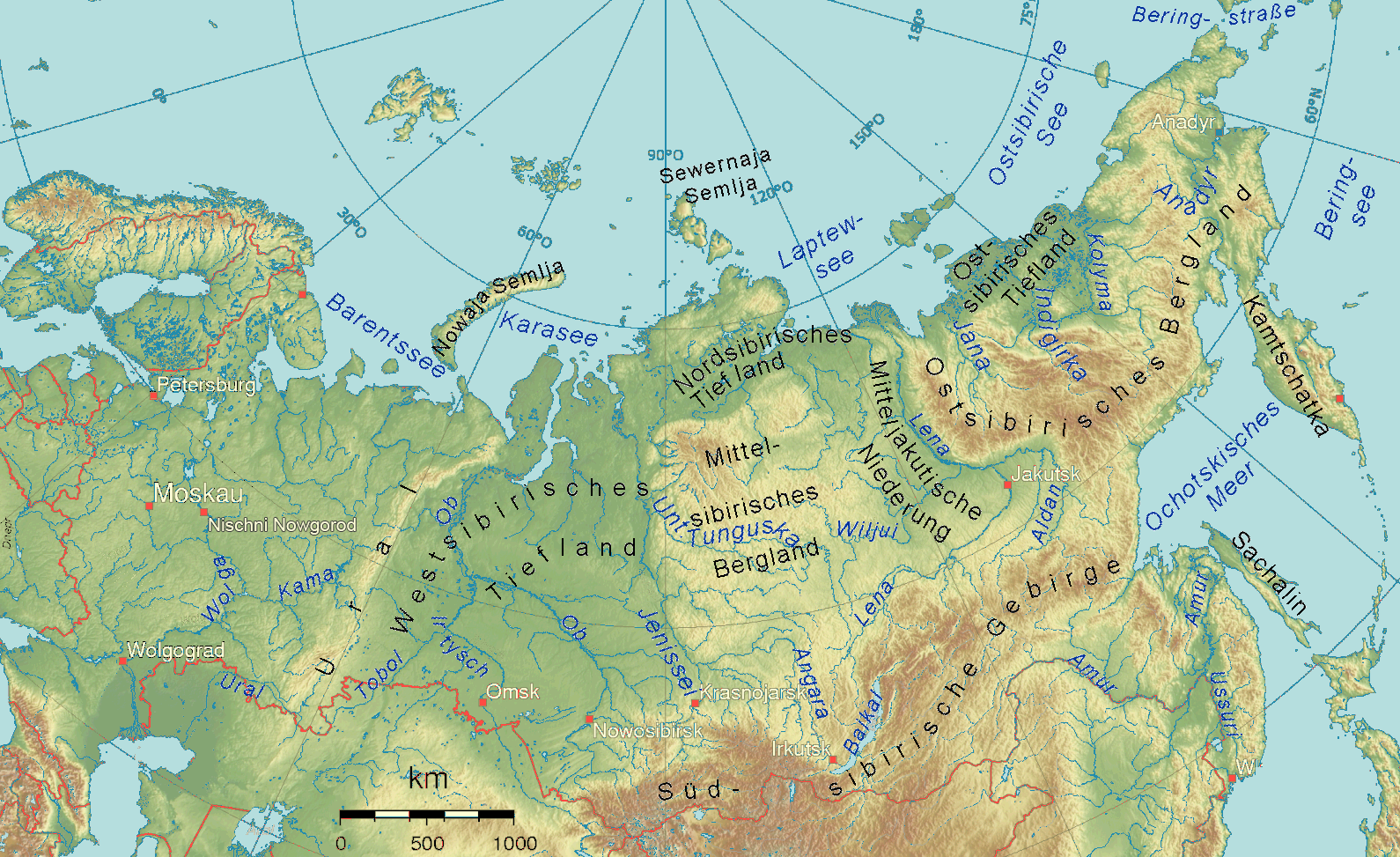
Map naming the seven geomorphological regions of the Russian Federation that are located east of the Urals. (In German)

== See also ==
- Federal districts of Russia
- Outline of Russia
- Siberia§Geography
