= Putorana Plateau =

Mountainous plateau in central Siberia, Russia

- Путорана
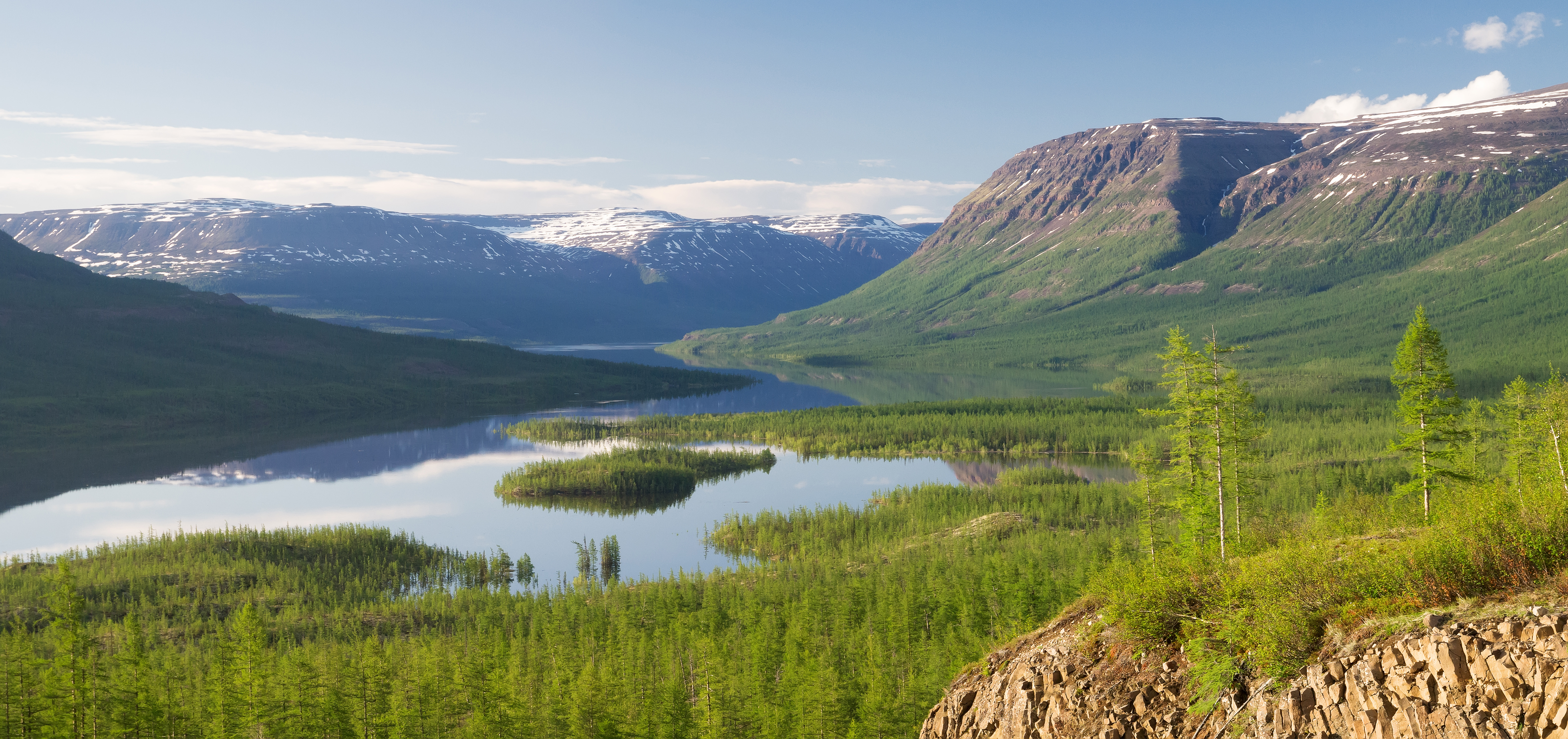
- Landscape of the Putorana area

Highest point
- Peak: Mount Kamen
- Elevation: 1,678 m (5,505 ft)

Dimensions
- Length: 800 km (500 mi)
- Width: 500 km (310 mi)

Geography
- Location within Krasnoyarsk Krai
- Country: Russia
- Federal subject: Krasnoyarsk Krai
- Range coordinates: 69°0′N 93°30′E
- Parent range: Central Siberian Plateau
- Borders on: North Siberian Lowland, Tunguska Plateau and Syverma Plateau

Geology
- Rock age: Paleozoic
- Rock type(s): Basalt, trap rock

Climbing
- Easiest route: From Norilsk and Talnakh

Putorana Plateau
UNESCO World Heritage Site
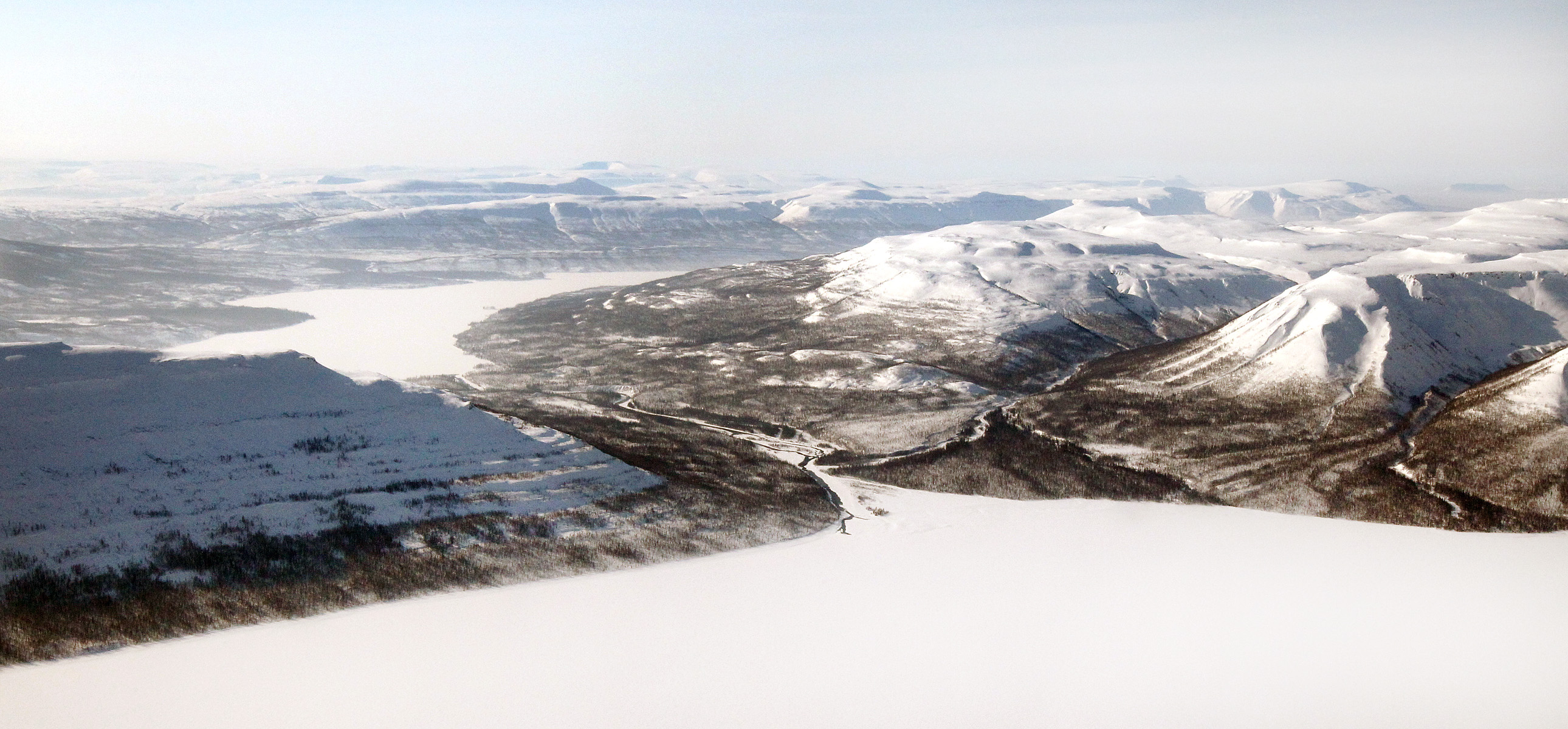

- Location within Russia Location within Krasnoyarsk Krai
- Location: Krasnoyarsk Krai, Russia, Asia
- Criteria: Natural: (vii), (ix)
- Reference: 1234rev
- Inscription: 2010 (34th Session)
- Area: 1,887,251 ha (4,663,500 acres)
- Buffer zone: 1,773,300 ha (4,382,000 acres)
- Website: zapovedsever.ru
- Coordinates: 69°2′49″N 94°9′29″E

The Putorana Plateau (Russian: плато Путорана, romanized: plato Putorana) or the Putorana Mountains is a mountainous area in Russia. It is a large massif or plateau crossed by mountain ranges. The nearest large settlement is Norilsk, where foreign travel is restricted. The city is served by Alykel Airport.

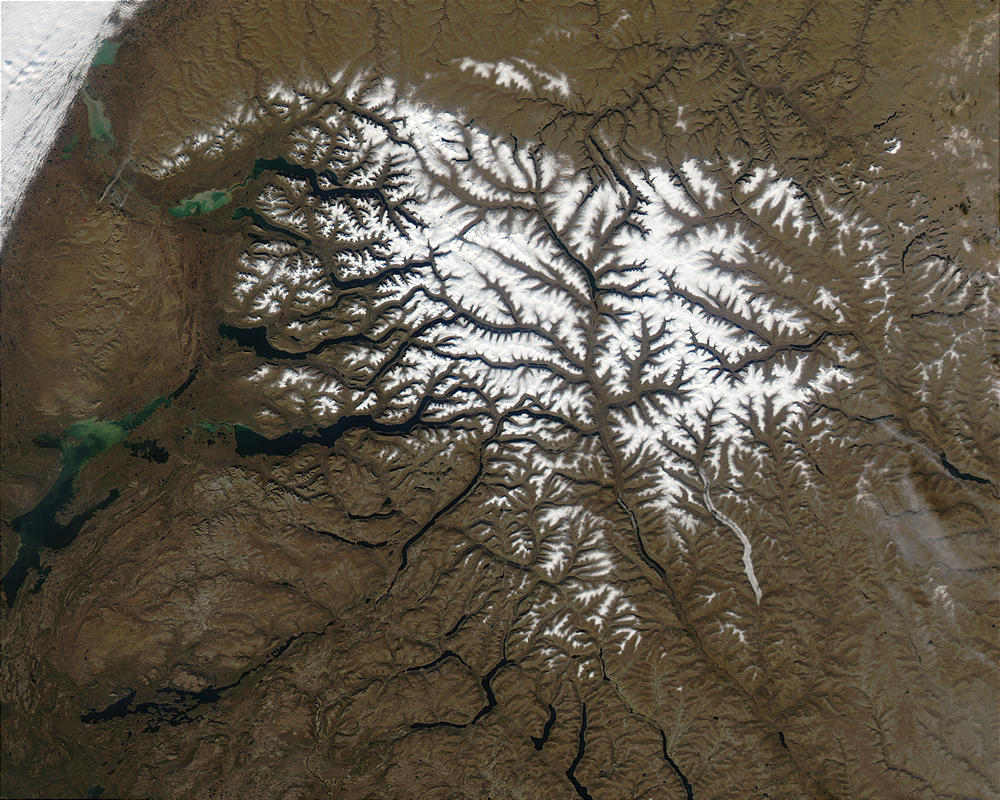
The ranges of the Putorana covered in snow make it stand out among the neighboring lower plateaus. To the upper left the Yenisei valley. NASA image.

The area of the mountains contains some of the largest known nickel deposits in the world.

== Geography ==
The Putorana Plateau is a high-lying plateau crossed by mountain ranges at the northwestern edge of the Central Siberian Plateau. It is located east of the Yenisei River valley, between 67° and 70° N of latitude, southwest of the Anabar Plateau, north of the Syverma and Tunguska plateaus and south of the North Siberian Lowland. The main subranges of the Putorana are the Keta Range, Lontokoisky Kamen, Kharayelakh Range, Chaya-Ayan, Brus Kamen, and Lama Range, among others. The highest mountain in the range system is Mount Kamen which stands 1,678 m (5,505 ft) above sea level and is also the highest point of the Central Siberian Plateau. Talnikovy Waterfall is reputedly one of the highest waterfalls in Asia.

Lakes on the plateau such as the Lake Dyupkun and Lake Lama are large and form whole ecosystems, which spread over many tens of kilometers. The more than 25,000 lakes are between 180 and 420 m (590 and 1,400 ft) deep, and together they form the second-largest store of fresh water in Russia by capacity after Lake Baikal.

Russia's geographical center, Lake Vivi, is situated on the southern limit of the plateau, where it overlaps with the Syverma Plateau.

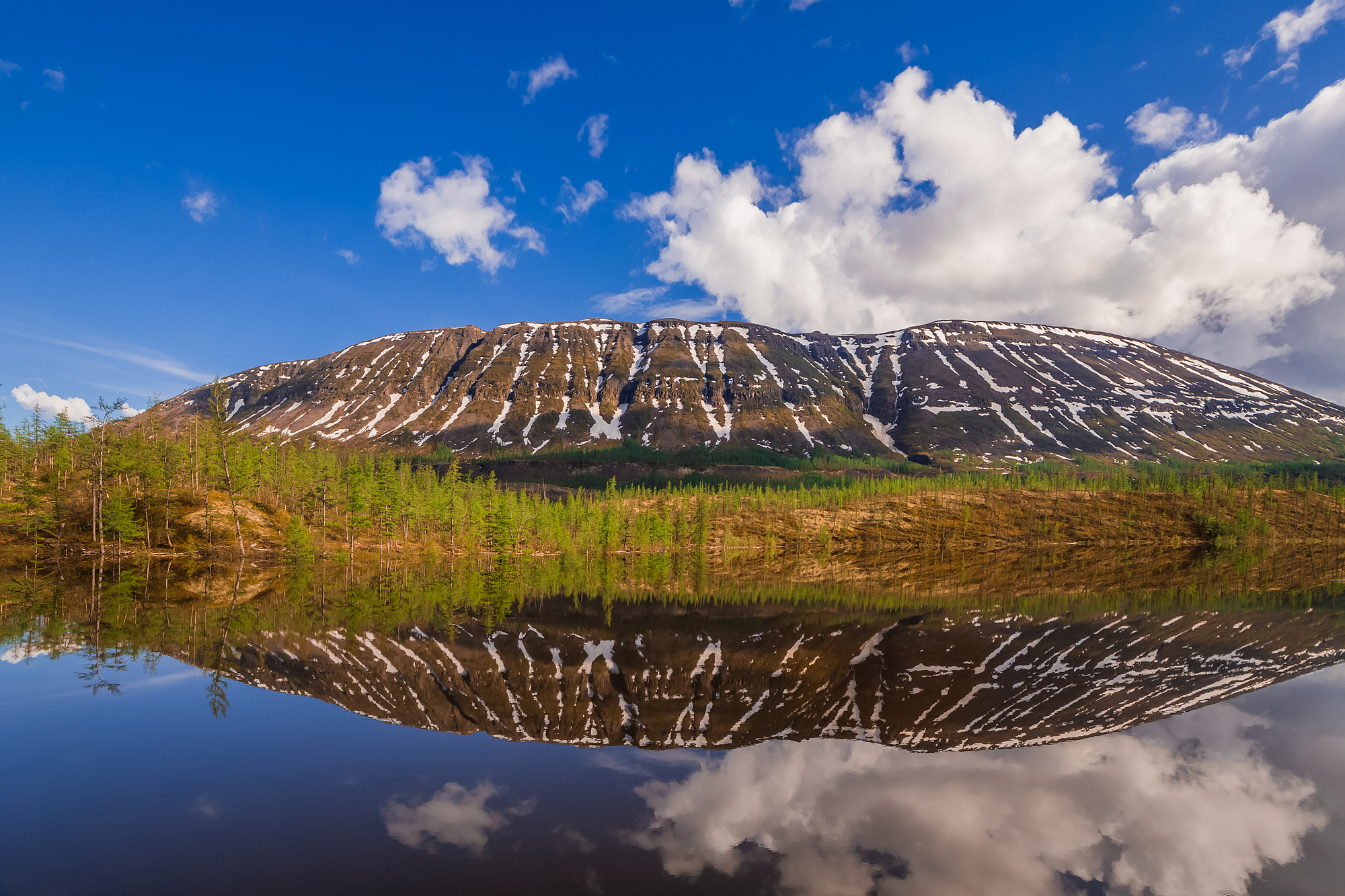
Lake and reflection in the Putorana area

== Geology ==
The Putorana area is mainly composed of basalt from the Siberian Traps.

== Climate ==
The Putorana region is located above the Arctic Circle. The climate is a harsh subarctic, sharply continental, with long, severely cold winters, and short, cool summers. However, in certain lake valleys, such as Lake Lama, there is a somewhat milder microclimate owing to the protection afforded by neighboring ranges from the northern winds. The higher elevations within the plateau transition to a tundra climate.

Spring, summer and autumn fall respectively in the months of June, July, and August, the remaining months are winter with temperatures between −32 °C (−26 °F) and −40 °C (−40 °F). In July, the warmest month, average air temperatures stay around 8 °C (46 °F) and may reach a maximum of 16 °C (61 °F). Precipitation is between 500 millimeters (20 in) and 800 millimeters (31 in), falling mainly in the summer in the form of rain. The snow cover in winter is relatively sparse.

== Protected area ==
The Putorana Nature Reserve, established in 1988 and administered from Norilsk, is a protected area (zapovednik) covering some 1,887,251 ha (4,663,500 acres) with a buffer zone of 1,773,300 ha (4,382,000 acres). It was set up to protect the world's largest herd of wild reindeer, as well as snow sheep.

In July 2010, the Reserve was inscribed on the World Heritage List as "a complete set of subarctic and arctic ecosystems in an isolated mountain range, including pristine taiga, forest-tundra, tundra, and arctic desert systems, as well as untouched cold-water lake and river systems".

== Natural resources ==
The Plateau's minerals include igneous basalt rocks, iron ores (magnetite and hematite), silicates (prehnite, zeolite), apatites, perovskites and highly saturated copper and nickel ores. The natural resources are presented by abundant water and coal.

== Gallery ==
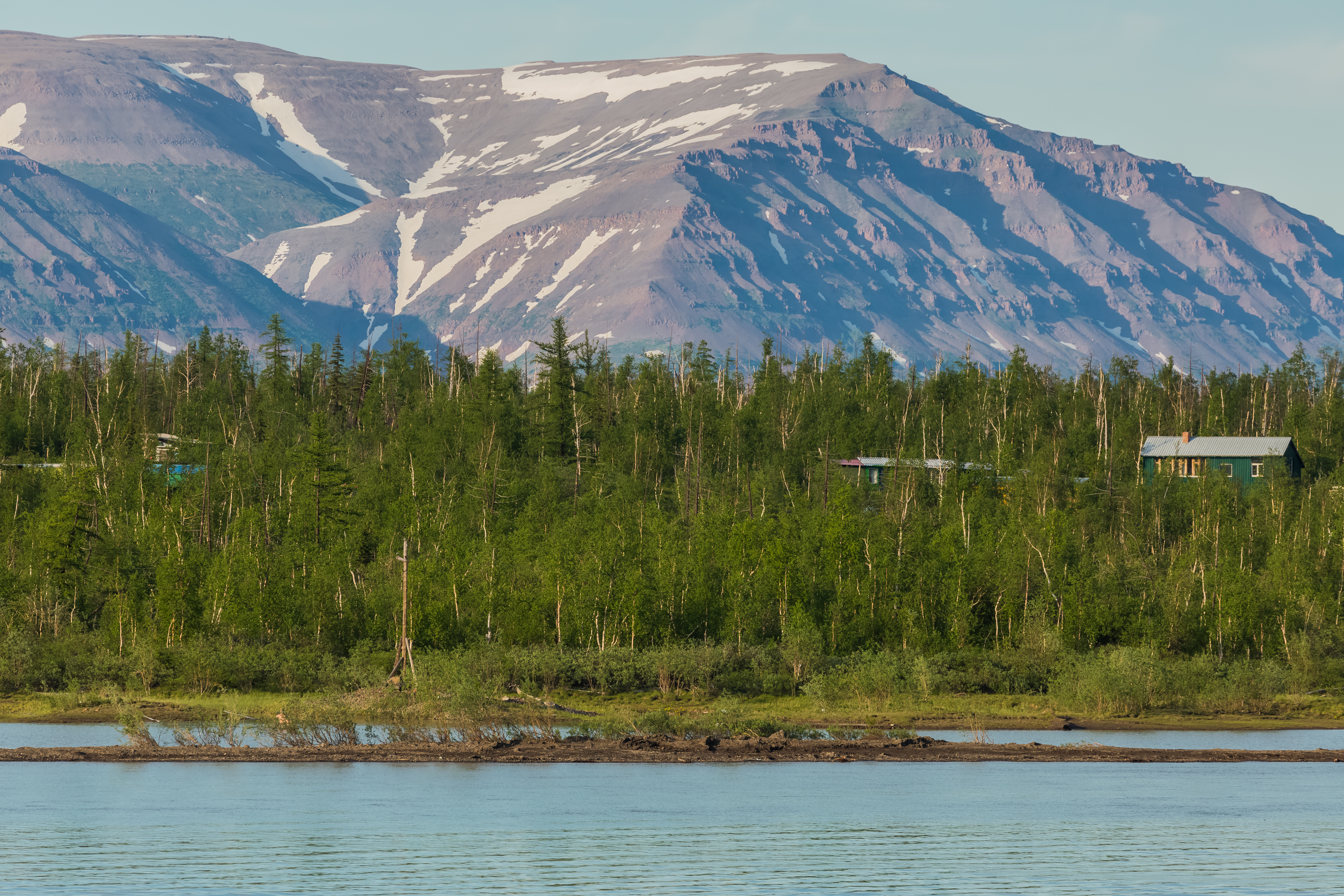
Mountains near Norilsk, at the northwest end of the Putorana Plateau. Notice the wooded taiga in the foreground, near the lake and at lower elevation, in contrast to the treeless tundra landscape in the mountains in the background.

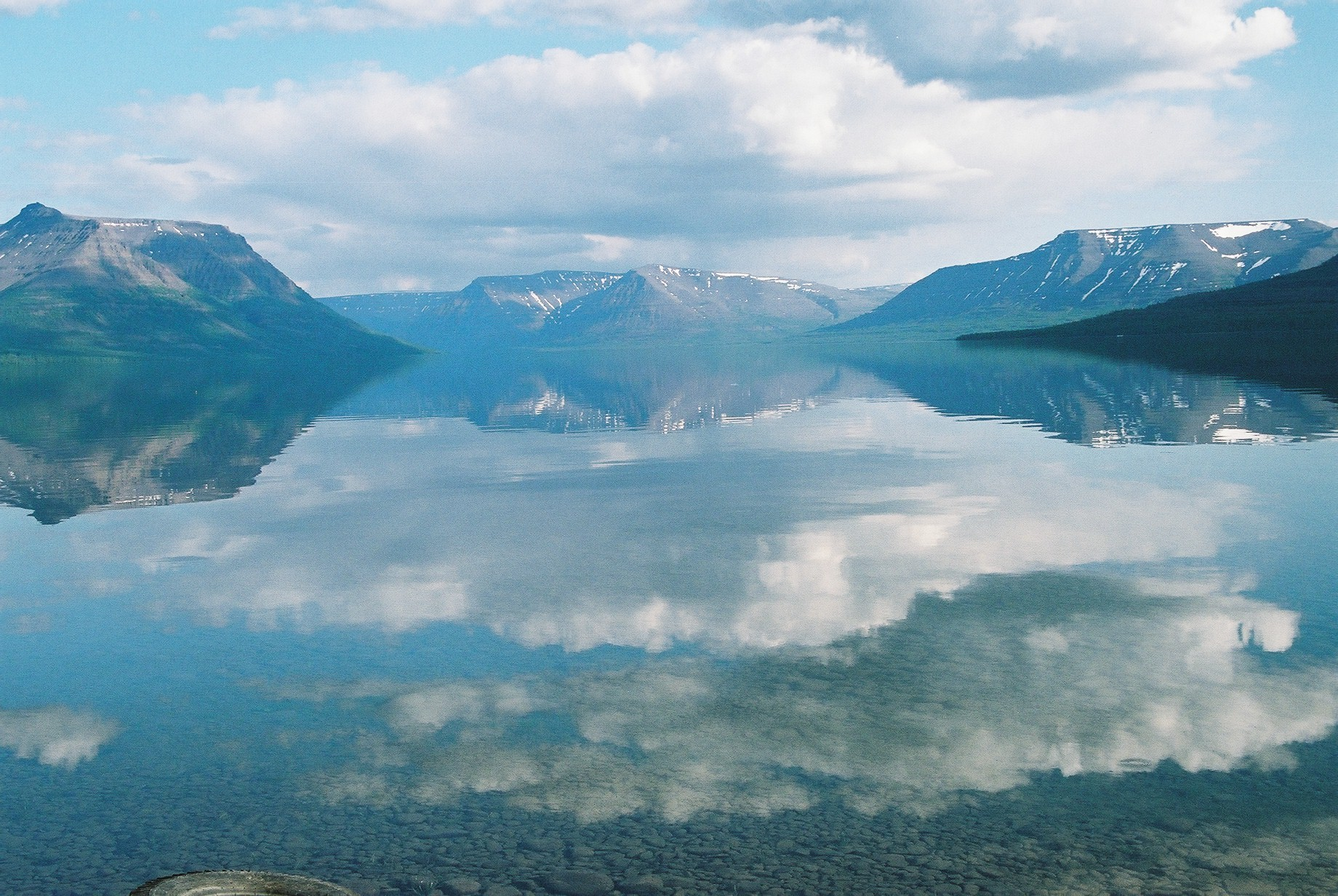
Lake Lama

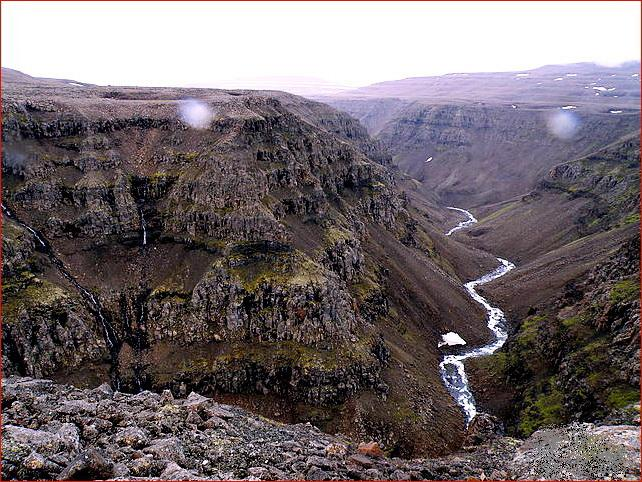
Putorana landscape

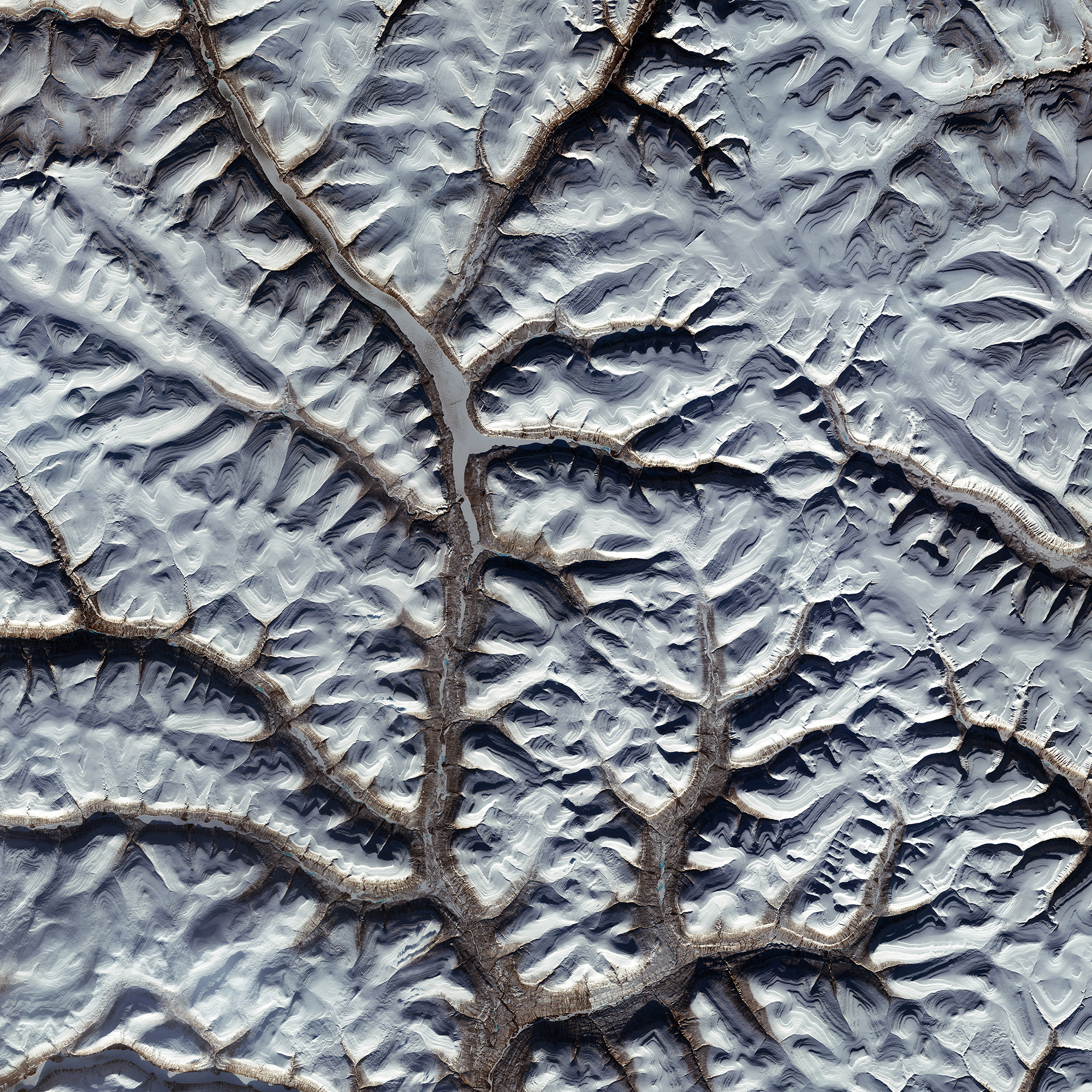
From space

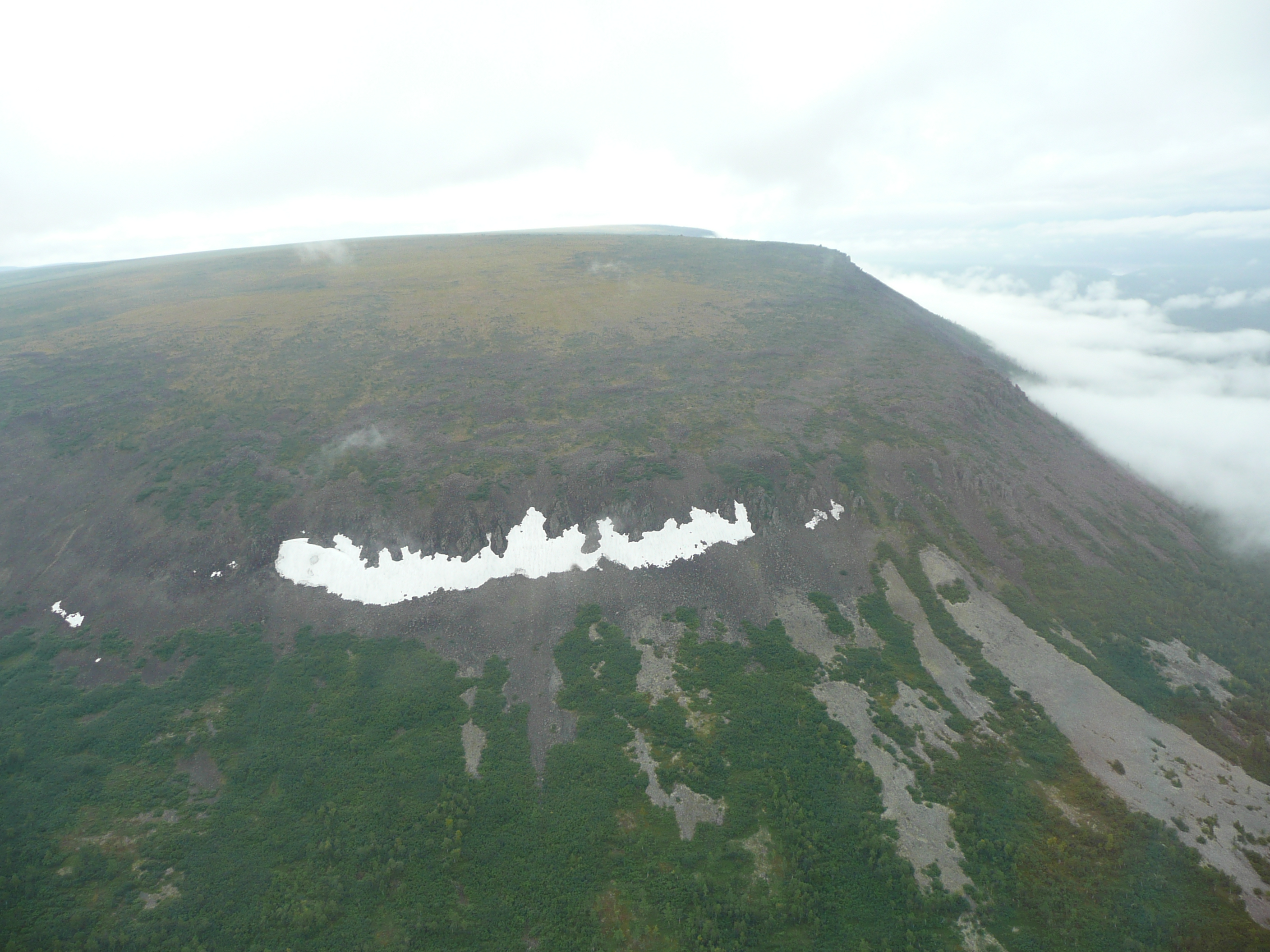
Putorana Plateau is composed of Siberian Traps

== See also ==
- Great Russian Regions
