= Mount Kamen =

Mountain in Russia

Kamen
- Location within Russia

Highest point
- Elevation: 1,678 m (5,505 ft)
- Prominence: 1,383 m (4,537 ft)
- Listing: Ribu
- Coordinates: 69°08′0″N 95°04′0″E

Geography
- Location: Krasnoyarsk Krai, Russia
- Parent range: Putorana

Kamen (Russian: Камень), at 1,678 m (5,505 ft) is the highest mountain in the Putorana Plateau, Russia.

== See also ==
- List of mountains in Russia
