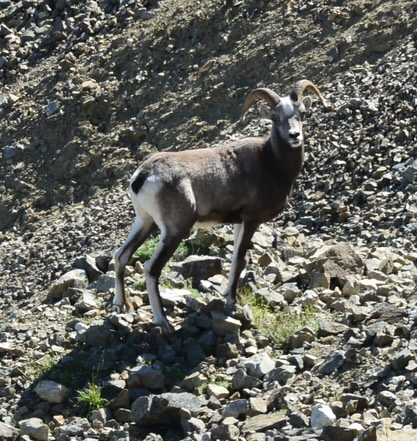

Conservation status
- Least Concern (IUCN 3.1)

Scientific classification
- Kingdom: Animalia
- Phylum: Chordata
- Class: Mammalia
- Infraclass: Placentalia
- Order: Artiodactyla
- Family: Bovidae
- Subfamily: Caprinae
- Genus: Ovis
- Species: O. nivicola

Binomial name
- Ovis nivicola Eschscholtz, 1829
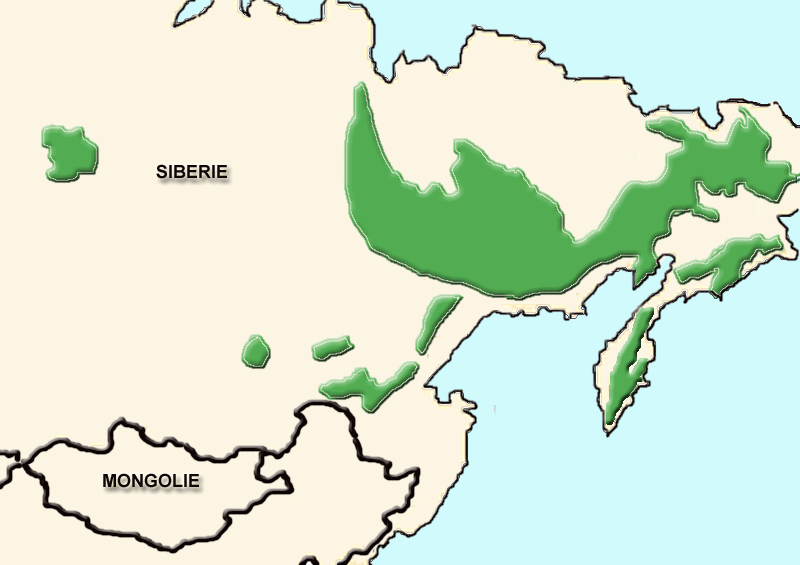

= Snow sheep =

Species of mammal

The snow sheep (Ovis nivicola), or Siberian bighorn sheep, is a species of sheep from the mountainous areas in the northeast of Siberia. One subspecies, the Putorana snow sheep (Ovis nivicola borealis), lives isolated from the other forms on the Putorana Plateau.

== Subspecies ==
- Kolyma snow sheep, O. n. ssp
- Koryak snow sheep, O. n. koriakorum
- Okhotsk snow sheep, O. n. alleni
- Yakutian snow sheep, O. n. lydekkeri
- Kamchatkan snow sheep, O. n. nivicola
- Putorana snow sheep, O. n. borealis
- Chukotka snow sheep, O. n. tschuktschorum

== Taxonomy and genetics ==
Ovis nivicola appeared about 600,000 years ago. A number of these wild sheep crossed the Bering Land Bridge (Beringia), from Siberia into Alaska, during the Pleistocene epoch (about 750,000 years ago); new and extant lineages were created from this migration, notably the North American Dall sheep (or thin-horn sheep) and the bighorn sheep, the two which O. nivicola is most closely related to.

Currently the mitochondrial genome of Ovis nivicola has been completely mapped out.

A first-draft genome assembly exists for Ovis nivicola.
