= List of airports by IATA code: Z =

IATA	ICAO	Airport name	Location served
-ZA-
ZAA		Alice Arm/Silver City Water Aerodrome (TC: CAC3)	Alice Arm, British Columbia, Canada
ZAC	CZAC	York Landing Airport	York Landing, Manitoba, Canada
ZAD	LDZD	Zadar Airport	Zadar, Croatia
ZAG	LDZA	Franjo Tuđman Airport	Zagreb, Croatia
ZAH	OIZH	Zahedan Airport	Zahedan, Iran
ZAJ	OAZJ	Zaranj Airport	Zaranj, Afghanistan
ZAL	SCVD	Pichoy Airport	Valdivia, Chile
ZAM	RPMZ	Zamboanga International Airport	Zamboanga City, Philippines
ZAO	LFCC	Cahors - Lalbenque Airport	Cahors, Midi-Pyrénées, France
ZAR	DNZA	Zaria Airport	Zaria, Nigeria
ZAT	ZPZT	Zhaotong Airport	Zhaotong, Yunnan, China
ZAZ	LEZG	Zaragoza Airport	Zaragoza, Aragon, Spain
-ZB-
ZBE	LKZA	Zábřeh Airport	Dolní Benešov, Czech Republic
ZBF	CZBF	Bathurst Airport	Bathurst, New Brunswick, Canada
ZBK		Žabljak Airport	Žabljak, Montenegro
ZBL		Biloela Airport	Biloela, Queensland, Australia
ZBM	CZBM	Roland-Désourdy Airport	Bromont, Quebec, Canada
ZBO	YBWN	Bowen Airport	Bowen, Queensland, Australia
ZBR	OIZC	Konarak Airport	Chabahar (Chah Bahar), Iran
ZBY	VLSB	Sayaboury Airport	Sainyabuli (Sayaboury), Laos
-ZC-
ZCL	MMZC	General Leobardo C. Ruiz International Airport	Zacatecas City, Zacatecas, Mexico
ZCO	SCQP	La Araucanía Airport	Temuco, Chile
-ZD-
ZDJ		Bern Railway Station	Bern, Switzerland
ZDY	OMDL	Dalma Airport	Dalma Island (Delma Island), United Arab Emirates
-ZE-
ZEC	FASC	Secunda Airport	Secunda, South Africa
ZEG		Senggo Airport	Senggo, Indonesia
ZEL	CBBC	Bella Bella (Campbell Island) Airport	Bella Bella, British Columbia, Canada
ZEM	CZEM	Eastmain River Airport	Eastmain, Quebec, Canada
ZEN		Zenag Airport	Zenag, Papua New Guinea
ZER	VEZO	Zero Airport (Ziro Airport)	Ziro, Arunachal Pradesh, India
-ZF-
ZFA	CZFA	Faro Airport	Faro, Yukon, Canada
ZFD	CZFD	Fond-du-Lac Airport	Fond-du-Lac, Saskatchewan, Canada
ZFL	ZWZS	Zhaosu Tianma Airport	Zhaosu County, Xinjiang, China
ZFM	CZFM	Fort McPherson Airport	Fort McPherson, Northwest Territories, Canada
ZFN	CZFN	Tulita Airport	Tulita, Northwest Territories, Canada
ZFW		Fairview Airport (TC: CEB5)	Fairview, Alberta, Canada
-ZG-
ZGF	CZGF	Grand Forks Airport	Grand Forks, British Columbia, Canada
ZGI	CZGI	Gods River Airport	Gods River, Manitoba, Canada
ZGL	YSGW	South Galway Airport	South Galway Station, Queensland, Australia
ZGM	FLNA	Ngoma Airport	Ngoma, Zambia
ZGN		Zhongshan Ferry Port	Zhongshan, Guangdong, China
ZGR	CZGR	Little Grand Rapids Airport	Little Grand Rapids, Manitoba, Canada
ZGS		La Romaine Airport (TC: CTT5)	La Romaine, Quebec, Canada
ZGU	NVSQ	Gaua Airport	Gaua, Vanuatu
-ZH-
ZHA	ZGZJ	Zhanjiang Wuchuan Airport	Zhanjiang, Guangdong, China
ZHM	VGSH	Shamshernagar Airport	Shamshernagar, Bangladesh
ZHP	CZHP	High Prairie Airport	High Prairie, Alberta, Canada
ZHT		Geneva Railway Station	Geneva, Switzerland
ZHY	ZLZW	Zhongwei Shapotou Airport (Zhongwei Xiangshan Airport)	Zhongwei, Ningxia, China
-ZI-
ZIA	UUBW	Ramenskoye Airport (Zhukovsky Airport)	Zhukovsky, Moscow Oblast, Russia
ZIC	SCTO	Victoria Airport	Victoria, Chile
ZIG	GOGG	Ziguinchor Airport	Ziguinchor, Senegal
ZIH	MMZH	Ixtapa-Zihuatanejo International Airport	Ixtapa / Zihuatanejo, Guerrero, Mexico
ZIS	HLZN	Alzintan Airport	Zintan, Libya
ZIX	UEVV	Zhigansk Airport	Zhigansk, Yakutia, Russia
ZIZ		Zamzama Airport	Zamzama, Pakistan
-ZJ-
ZJG	CZJG	Jenpeg Airport	Jenpeg, Manitoba, Canada
ZJN	CZJN	Swan River Airport	Swan River, Manitoba, Canada
ZJT		Tanjung Pelepas Port Airport	Tanjung Pelepas, Johor, Malaysia
-ZK-
ZKB	FLKY	Kasaba Bay Airport	Kasaba Bay, Zambia
ZKE	CZKE	Kashechewan Airport	Kashechewan, Ontario, Canada
ZKG		Kegaska Airport (TC: CTK6)	Kegaska (Kegashka), Quebec, Canada
ZKP	UESU	Zyryanka Airport	Zyryanka, Yakutia, Russia
-ZL-
ZLO	MMZO	Playa de Oro International Airport	Manzanillo, Colima, Mexico
ZLT		La Tabatière Airport (TC: CTU5)	Gros-Mécatina (La Tabatière), Quebec, Canada
ZLW		Pasir Gudang Port Airport	Pasir Gudang, Johor, Malaysia
ZLX	HSZA	Zalingei Airport	Zalingei (Zalengei), Sudan
-ZM-
ZMD	SWSN	Sena Madureira Airport	Sena Madureira, Acre, Brazil
ZMH	CZML	South Cariboo Regional Airport	108 Mile Ranch, British Columbia, Canada
ZMM	MMZM	Zamora National Airport	Zamora, Michoacán, Mexico
ZMT	CZMT	Masset Airport	Masset, British Columbia, Canada
-ZN-
ZNA		Nanaimo Harbour Water Airport (TC: CAC8)	Nanaimo, British Columbia, Canada
ZNC		Nyac Airport	Nyac, Alaska, United States
ZND	DRZR	Zinder Airport	Zinder, Niger
ZNE	YNWN	Newman Airport	Newman, Western Australia, Australia
ZNU		Namu Water Aerodrome	Namu, British Columbia, Canada
ZNZ	HTZA	Abeid Amani Karume International Airport	Zanzibar, Tanzania
-ZO-
ZOF		Ocean Falls Water Aerodrome (TC: CAH2)	Ocean Falls, British Columbia, Canada
ZOS	SCJO	Cañal Bajo Carlos Hott Siebert Airport	Osorno, Chile
-ZP-
ZPB	CZPB	Sachigo Lake Airport	Sachigo Lake, Ontario, Canada
ZPC	SCPC	Pucón Airport	Pucón, Chile
ZPH	KZPH	Zephyrhills Municipal Airport	Zephyrhills, Florida, United States
ZPO	CZPO	Pinehouse Lake Airport	Pinehouse, Saskatchewan, Canada
-ZQ-
ZQN	NZQN	Queenstown Airport	Queenstown, New Zealand
ZQS		Queen Charlotte City Water Aerodrome (TC: CAQ6)	Queen Charlotte, British Columbia, Canada
ZQW	EDRZ	Zweibrücken Airport	Zweibrücken, Rhineland-Palatinate, Germany
ZQZ	ZBZJ	Zhangjiakou Ningyuan Airport	Zhangjiakou, Hebei, China
-ZR-
ZRH	LSZH	Zurich Airport	Zürich, Switzerland
ZRI	WABO	Serui Airport	Serui, Indonesia
ZRJ	CZRJ	Round Lake (Weagamow Lake) Airport	North Caribou Lake (Round Lake), Ontario, Canada
ZRM	WAJI	Sarmi Orai Airport	Sarmi, Indonesia
-ZS-
ZSA	MYSM	San Salvador Airport (Cockburn Town Airport)	San Salvador Island, Bahamas
ZSE	FMEP	Pierrefonds Airport	Saint-Pierre, Réunion, France
ZSJ	CZSJ	Sandy Lake Airport	Sandy Lake, Ontario, Canada
ZSS	DISS	Sassandra Airport	Sassandra, Ivory Coast
ZST	CZST	Stewart Aerodrome	Stewart, British Columbia, Canada
ZSW	CZSW	Prince Rupert/Seal Cove Water Airport	Prince Rupert, British Columbia, Canada
-ZT-
ZTA	NTGY	Tureia Airport	Tureia, Tuamotus, French Polynesia
ZTB		Tête-à-la-Baleine Airport (TC: CTB6)	Tête-à-la-Baleine, Quebec, Canada
ZTH	LGZA	Zakynthos International Airport (Dionysios SolomosAirport)	Zakynthos, Greece
ZTM	CZTM	Shamattawa Airport	Shamattawa, Manitoba, Canada
ZTR	UKKV	Zhytomyr Airport	Zhytomyr, Ukraine
ZTS		Tahsis Water Aerodrome (TC: CAL9)	Tahsis, British Columbia, Canada
ZTU	UBBY	Zaqatala International Airport	Zaqatala, Azerbaijan
-ZU-
ZUC	CZUC	Ignace Municipal Airport	Ignace, Ontario, Canada
ZUD	SCAC	Pupelde Airfield	Ancud, Chile
ZUH	ZGSD	Zhuhai Jinwan Airport (Zhuhai Sanzao Airport)	Zhuhai, Guangdong, China
ZUL	OEZL	Zilfi Airport	Al Zulfi (Zilfi), Saudi Arabia
ZUM	CZUM	Churchill Falls Airport	Churchill Falls, Newfoundland and Labrador, Canada
-ZV-
ZVA	FMMN	Miandrivazo Airport	Miandrivazo, Madagascar
ZVG		Springvale Airport	Springvale, Western Australia, Australia
ZVK	VLSK	Savannakhet Airport	Savannakhet, Laos
-ZW-
ZWA	FMND	Andapa Airport	Andapa, Madagascar
ZWL	CZWL	Wollaston Lake Airport	Wollaston Lake, Saskatchewan, Canada
-ZX-
ZXT	UBTT	Zabrat Airport	Baku, Azerbaijan
-ZY-
ZYI	ZUZY	Zunyi Xinzhou Airport	Zunyi, Guizhou, China
ZYL	VGSY	Osmani International Airport	Sylhet, Bangladesh
-ZZ-
ZZA		Ko Mai Si Airport	Ko Mai Si, Ko Kut Trat Province, Thailand
ZZE	UBBZ	Zangilan International Airport	Zangilan, East Zangezur, Azerbaijan
ZZO	UHSO	Zonalnoye Airport	Tymovskoye, Sakhalin Oblast, Russia
ZZU	FWUU	Mzuzu Airport	Mzuzu, Malawi
ZZV	KZZV	Zanesville Municipal Airport	Zanesville, Ohio, United States
