= Zeg =

Zeg or ZEG may refer to:

== Transportation ==
- Zweirad Einkaufs Genossenschaft (ZEG), a German bicycle distributor
- ZEG, a type of rail car used in rail transport in China
- Senggo Airport (IATA airport code ZEG), Senggo, Indonesia; see List of airports by IATA airport code: Z

== Fictional characteres ==
- Zeg, a fictional character from the U.S. animated TV show Blaze and the Monster Machines
- Zeg the Tyrant, a fictional character from the 1984 film The Warrior and the Sorceress
- Zeg, a fictional character from the 1977 novel Krozair of Kregen by Kenneth Bulmer writing as Alan Burt Akers
- Kazimierc "Zeg" Zegota-Januszajtis, a fictional DC Comics character from the comic book series Blackhawk (DC Comics)

== Other uses ==
- Mumeng language (ISO 639 language code zeg), a language found in Papua New Guinea

== See also ==
- Zege Peninsula
- Zege
