= Molodo (river) =

River in Russia

Molodo Молодо / Муолада
- Basin of the Lena

- Location in the Sakha Republic, Russia

Location
- Country: Russia

Physical characteristics
- Source
  - location: Central Siberian Plateau
  - coordinates: 70.366°N 120.832°E
- Mouth: Lena
  - coordinates: 69.5744°N 124.7410°E
- Length: 556 km (345 mi)
- Basin size: 26,900 square kilometres (10,400 mi^{2})

Basin features
- Progression: Lena→ Laptev Sea

The Molodo (Russian: Молодо, Yakut: Муолада, Muolada) is a river in Bulunsky District, Sakha Republic, Russia. It is a major left tributary of the Lena. The Molodo is 556 kilometres (345 mi) long, and the area of its basin 26,900 square kilometres (10,400 sq mi).

The banks of the Molodo are not inhabited. River sediments contain alluvial gold and diamonds.

== Geography ==
The Molodo originates at the confluence of the Molodo-Khangas-Anabyla and the Molodo-Unga-Anabyla in the Central Siberian Plateau, western part of Bulunsky District. From the source it flows generally south, and accepts the Khastakh from the left. Downstream of the mouth of the Khastakh the Molodo turns east, accepts the Daldyn from the left and turns southeast. Below the mouth of the Syungyude the Molodo turns northeast, accepts the Muogdan from the left and turns right. The mouth of the Molodo is 413 kilometres (257 mi) upstream of the mouth of the Lena.

The drainage basin of the Molodo includes the southwestern part of Bulunsky District and the northwestern part of Zhigansky District.

=== Tributaries ===
The longest tributary of the Molodo is the 466 km (290 mi) long Syungyude, joining it from the right.

== Geology ==
A geological outcrop along the river ("Molodo river section") was a candidate for the definition of the base of Wuliuan. If chosen, the stage would have been named Molodian, after the river.

== See also ==
- List of rivers of Russia
