= Kystatyam =

Kystatyam Кыстатыам Кыстатыам (Sakha)
- Selo
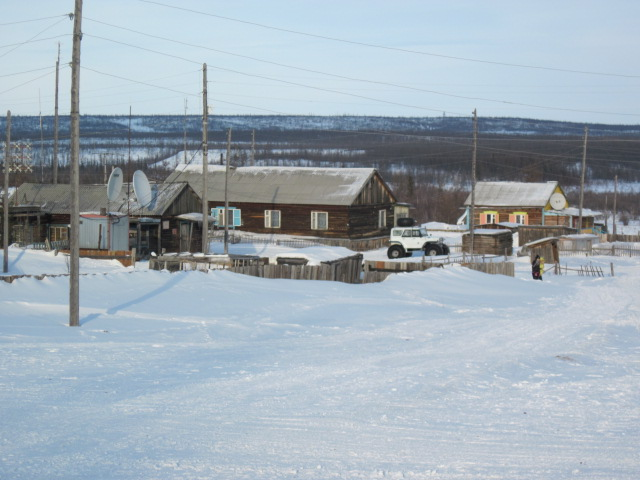

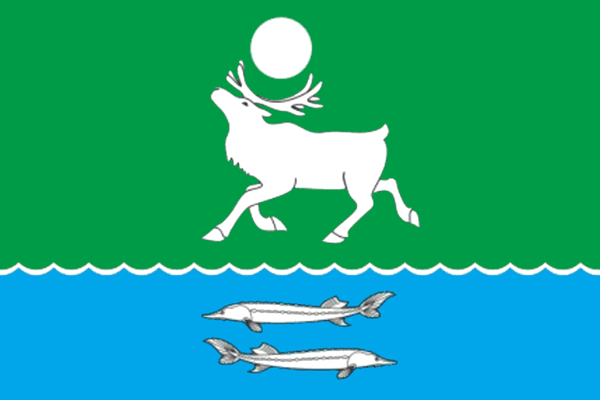
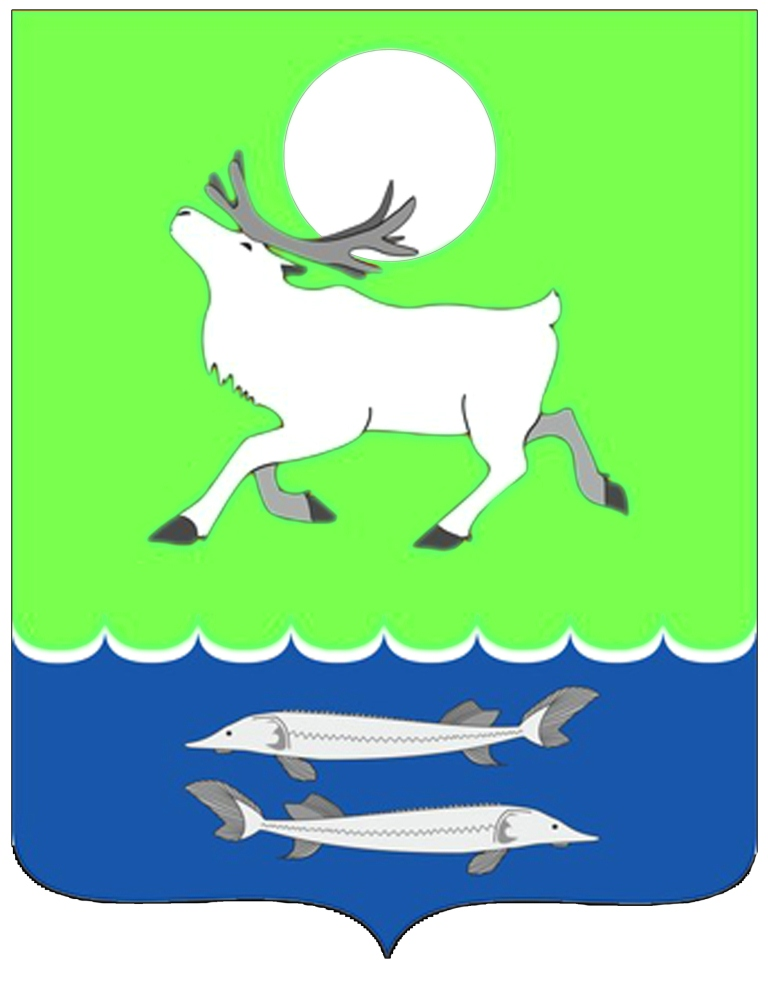
- Flag Coat of arms
- Interactive map of Kystatyam
- Location of Kystatyam Kystatyam (Sakha Republic)
- Coordinates: 67°19′N 123°20′E
- Country: Russia
- Federal subject: Sakha Republic
- Administrative district: Zhigansky District
- Rural okrugSelsoviet: Lensky Rural Okrug

Population (2010 Census)
  - Total: 397
  - Estimate (2021): 408 (+2.8%)

Administrative status
  - Capital of: Lensky Rural Okrug

Municipal status
  - Municipal district: Zhigansky Municipal District
  - Rural settlement: Kystatyam Rural Settlement
  - Capital of: Kystatyam Rural Settlement
- Time zone: UTC+
- Postal code: 678343
- OKTMO ID: 98622417101

Kystatyam (Russian: Кыстатыам; Yakut: Кыстатыам, Kıstatıam) is a rural locality (a selo). It is the only inhabited locality and the administrative center of Lensky Rural Okrug of Zhigansky District in the Sakha Republic, Russia. It is located 90 kilometers (56 mi) from Zhigansk – the administrative center of the district. Its population, as of the 2010 Census was 397, down from 453, which was recorded during the 2002 Census.
