= Syungyude =

River in Yakutia (Sakha Republic), Russia

Syungyude Сюнгююдэ / Сүҥгүдэ
- Lena basin with the Syungyude in the upper part

- Location in the Sakha Republic, Russia

Location
- Country: Russia

Physical characteristics
- Source
  - location: Central Siberian Plateau
  - coordinates: 69°15′43″N 120°18′29″E
  - elevation: 295 m (968 ft)
- Mouth: Molodo
  - coordinates: 69°13′04″N 122°58′15″E
  - elevation: 38 m (125 ft)
- Length: 466 km (290 mi)
- Basin size: 9,550 square kilometres (3,690 mi^{2})

Basin features
- Progression: Molodo→Lena→ Laptev Sea

The Syungyude (Russian: Сюнгююдэ, Yakut: Сүҥгүдэ, Süŋgüde) is a river in the Sakha Republic (Yakutia), Russia. It is the largest tributary of the Molodo, of the Lena basin. Its length is 466 kilometres (290 mi) and the area of its basin 9,550 square kilometres (3,690 sq mi).

The Syungyude flows across the Zhigansky and Bulunsky district. The banks of the river are uninhabited.

== Geography ==
The Syungyude originates in the eastern Central Siberian Plateau. In its upper course it flows southeast for a long distance, finally descending into a floodplain. It meanders strongly just north of the Motorchuna, flowing parallel to it until it turns northeast and then NNE in a wide arc. In its last stretch the Syungyude flows roughly northwards with the floodplain of the Lena to the east. It runs parallel to the great river until it joins the right bank of the Molodo 167 kilometres (104 mi) upstream of its mouth in the Lena.

=== Tributaries ===
The longest tributary of the Syungyude is the 144 km (89 mi) long Kyuskyurdeen (Кюскюрдьээн), joining it from the left. Other major tributaries are the 66 km (41 mi) long Kisiliike, 43 km (27 mi) long Kharyyalaakh, 51 km (32 mi) long Kurung-Yurege and 51 km (32 mi) long Muuna from the left, as well as the 48 km (30 mi) long Ulakhan-Orusuoka, 39 km (24 mi) long Orusuoka-Syra, 57 km (35 mi) long Orusuoka, 122 km (76 mi) long Khaiyrgastaakh, 53 km (33 mi) long Serpekelekh and 34 km (21 mi) long Argaa-Salaa from the right.

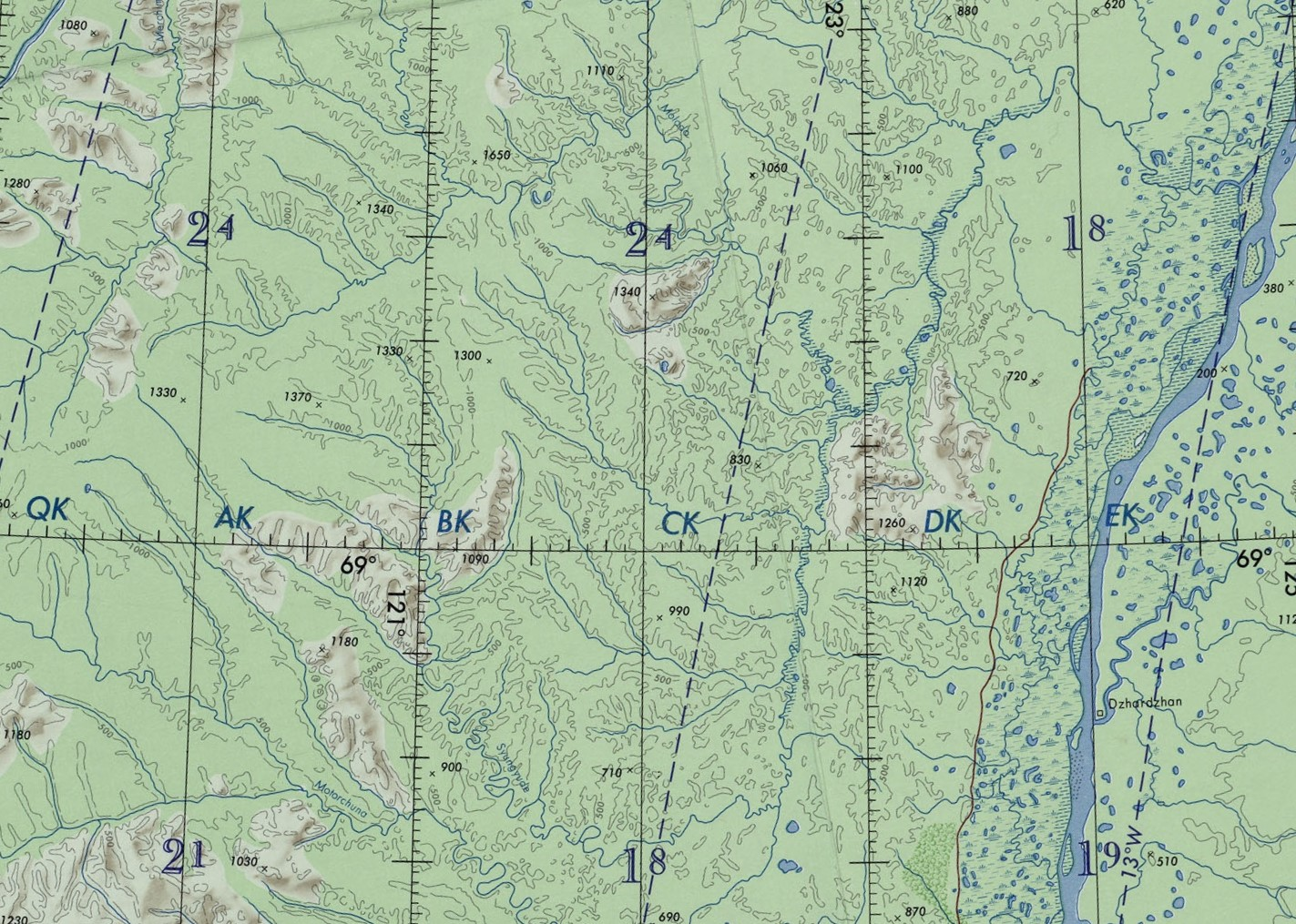
Course of the Syungyude river map section.

== See also ==
- List of rivers of Russia
