= Dzhardzhan (Lena) =

River in Russia

Dzhardzhan Джарджан / Дьардьаан
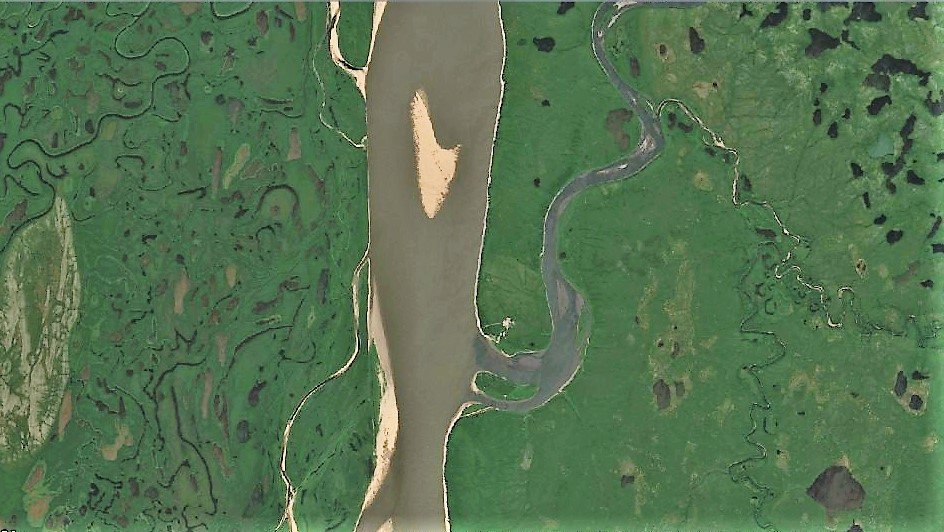
- Mouth of the Dzhardzhan river in the Lena Sentinel-2 image

- Mouth location in Yakutia, Russia

Location
- Country: Russia

Physical characteristics
- Source
  - location: Confluence of Malyr-Yuryage and Siekotendzha; Orulgan Range; Verkhoyansk Range
  - coordinates: 68°46′38″N 127°46′17″E
  - elevation: 228 m (748 ft)
- Mouth: Lena
  - coordinates: 68°43′17″N 124°02′15″E
  - elevation: 18 m (59 ft)
- Length: 297 km (185 mi) —352 km (219 mi) from the source of the Siekotendzha
- Basin size: 11,400 km^{2} (4,400 sq mi)

Basin features
- Progression: Lena→ Laptev Sea

The Dzhardzhan (Russian: Джарджан; Yakut: Дьардьаан, romanized: Carcaan) is a river in the Sakha Republic (Yakutia), Russia. It is one of the northern tributaries of the Lena. The river has a length of 297 kilometres (185 mi) —352 km (219 mi) from the source of the Siekotendzha— and a drainage basin area of 11,400 square kilometres (4,400 mi^{2}).

The river flows north of the Arctic Circle across the desolate territory of Zhigansky District. Dzhardzhan village, the formerly only inhabited place in the area, is located on the banks of the Lena, close to its mouth. There is an automatic weather station and oil storage tanks in the abandoned settlement.

== Course ==
The Dzhardzhan is a right tributary of the Lena. It has its origin on the western flank of the Orulgan Range, part of the Verkhoyansk Range system, being formed at the confluence of the Malyr-Yuryage and Siekotendzha rivers. It flows roughly westwards, cutting across the Dzhardzhan Range in its upper course and descending into a floodplain in its middle course. Towards the end the Dzhardzhan bends sharply southwestwards and southwards, joining the right bank of the Lena 513 km (319 mi) from its mouth.

The longest tributaries of the Dzhardzhan are the 91 kilometres (57 mi) long Kende, the 105 kilometres (65 mi) long Dzhanchan and the 215 kilometres (134 mi) long Ulakhan-Tirekhtyach.

Lena basin with the Dzhardzhan in the upper right

== See also ==
- List of rivers of Russia
