= Bakhanay =

Bakhanay Баханай
- Selo

Other transcription(s)
  - Sakha: Баахынай
- Interactive map of Bakhanay
- Location of Bakhanay Bakhanay (Sakha Republic)
- Coordinates: 66°01′24″N 123°39′03″E
- Country: Russia
- Federal subject: Sakha Republic
- Administrative district: Zhigansky District
- Rural okrugSelsoviet: Lindinsky Rural Okrug
- Founded: 1947

Population (2010 Census)
  - Total: 260
  - Estimate (2021): 260 (0%)

Administrative status
  - Capital of: Lindinsky Rural Okrug

Municipal status
  - Municipal district: Zhigansky Municipal District
  - Rural settlement: Lindinsky Rural Settlement
  - Capital of: Lindinsky Rural Settlement
- Time zone: UTC+
- Postal code: 678338
- OKTMO ID: 98622422101

Bakhanay (Russian: Баханай; Yakut: Баахынай, Baaxınay) is a rural locality (a selo), the only inhabited locality, and the administrative center of Lindinsky Rural Okrug of Zhigansky District in the Sakha Republic, Russia, located 110 kilometers (68 mi) from Zhigansk, the administrative center of the district. Its population as of the 2010 Census was 260, down from 285 recorded during the 2002 Census.
