= Bestyakh, Zhigansky District, Sakha Republic =

Bestyakh Бестях Бэстээх (Sakha)
- Selo
- Interactive map of Bestyakh
- Location of Bestyakh Bestyakh (Sakha Republic)
- Coordinates: 65°17′03″N 126°06′41″E
- Country: Russia
- Federal subject: Sakha Republic
- Administrative district: Zhigansky District
- Rural okrugSelsoviet: Bestyakhsky National Rural Okrug

Population (2010 Census)
  - Total: 218
  - Estimate (2021): 129 (−40.8%)

Administrative status
  - Capital of: Bestyakhsky National Rural Okrug

Municipal status
  - Municipal district: Zhigansky Municipal District
  - Rural settlement: Bestyakhsky Rural Settlement
  - Capital of: Bestyakhsky Rural Settlement
- Time zone: UTC+
- Postal code: 678330
- OKTMO ID: 98622405101

Bestyakh (Russian: Бестях; Yakut: Бэстээх, Besteex) is a rural locality (a selo), the only inhabited locality, and the administrative center of Bestyakhsky Rural Okrug of Zhigansky District in the Sakha Republic, Russia, located 150 kilometers (93 mi) from Zhigansk, the administrative center of the district. Its population as of the 2010 Census was 218, of whom 111 were male and 107 female, down from 228 recorded during the 2002 Census.
