= Menkere =

River in Russia

Menkere Мэнкэрэ / Мэҥкэрэ
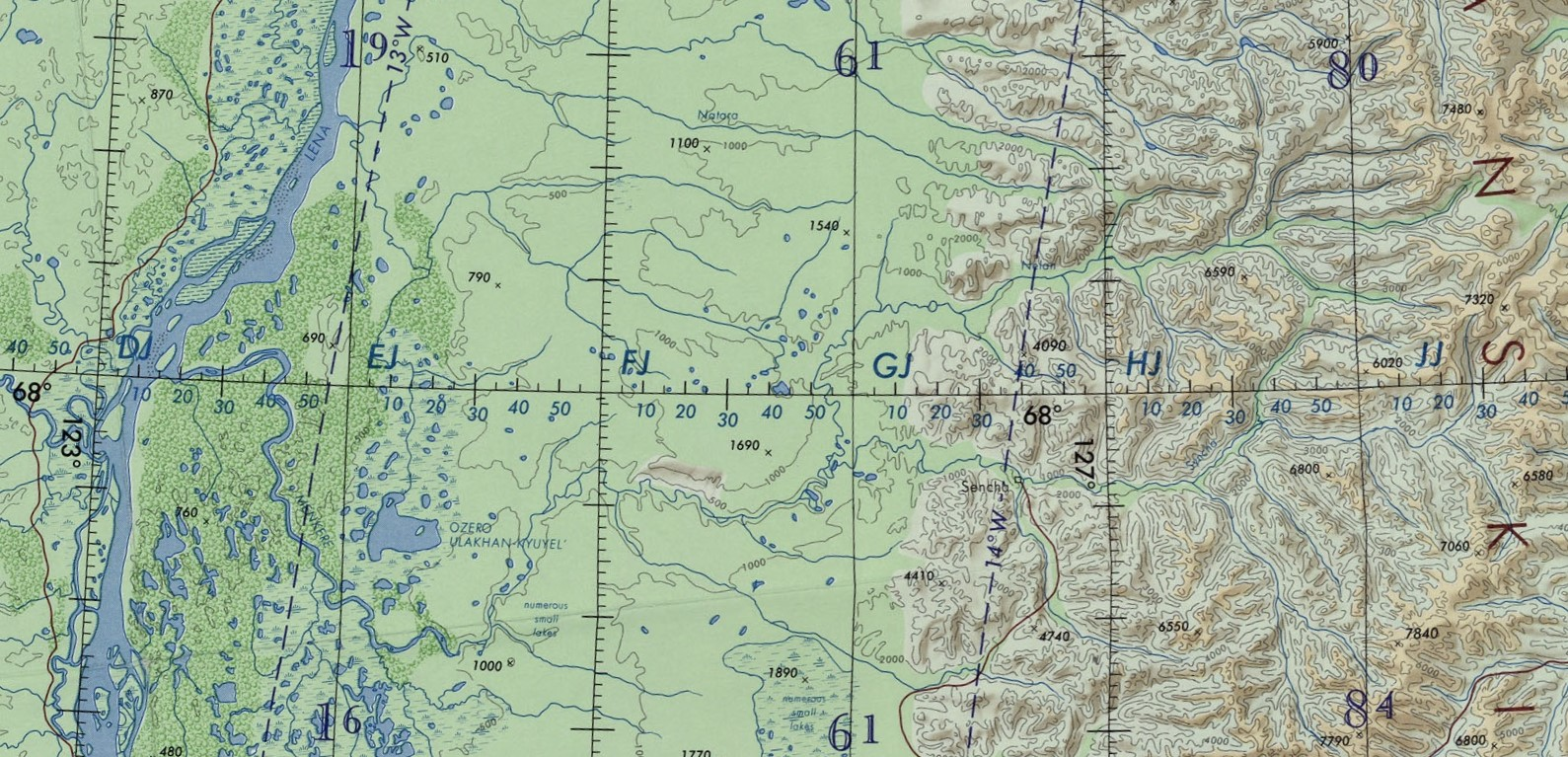
- Course of the Menkere ONC map section

- Mouth location in Yakutia, Russia

Location
- Country: Russia

Physical characteristics
- Source
  - location: Orulgan Range; Verkhoyansk Range
  - coordinates: 67°53′28″N 125°53′03″E
- Mouth: Lena
  - coordinates: 68°0′31″N 123°18′11″E
- Length: 227 km (141 mi) (402 km (250 mi))
- Basin size: 15,900 km^{2} (6,100 sq mi)

Basin features
- Progression: Lena→ Laptev Sea

The Menkere (Russian: Мэнкэрэ; Yakut: Мэҥкэрэ, Meŋkere) is a river in Sakha Republic (Yakutia), Russia. It is one of the major tributaries of the Lena. The river has a length of 227 kilometres (141 mi) —402 km (250 mi) together with the Syncha— and a drainage basin area of 15,900 square kilometres (6,100 mi^{2}).

The Menkere flows across desolate territories of Zhigansky District.

== Course ==
The Menkere is a right tributary of the Lena. It is formed on the western slopes of the Orulgan Range of the Verkhoyansk Range system, at the confluence of two long mountain rivers, the 175 kilometres (109 mi) long Syncha and the 130 kilometres (81 mi) long Nyoloon. It flows first roughly westwards. After leaving the mountains it heads southwestwards into the Central Yakutian Lowland, forming meanders in the flat permafrost floodplain. After a stretch it bends and flows roughly northwestwards. Finally it bends again and heads westwards for a stretch until it joins the right bank of the Lena 603 km (375 mi) from its mouth, near the mouth of the Motorchuna in the opposite bank.

The longest tributary of the Menkere is the 98 km (61 mi) long Dyuyogyesinde from the left. By the river are ice fields with total area of 100 km^{2} (39 sq mi). The last half of the river course describes a wide, roughly semicircular, arch around the southern area of Ulakhan-Kyuel lake.

Lena basin with the Menkere in the upper right

== Fauna ==
Among the fish species found in the waters of the Menkere lenok, pike, grayling and taimen are worth mentioning.

== See also ==
- List of rivers of Russia
