= Dzhardzhan =

Dzhardzhan Джарджан
- Selo

Other transcription(s)
  - Sakha: Дьардьаан
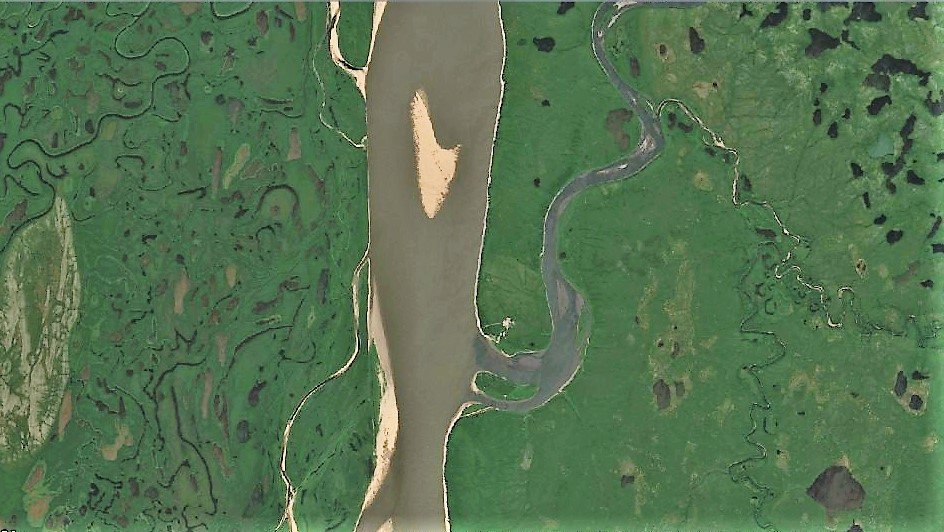
- Interactive map of Dzhardzhan
- Location of Dzhardzhan Dzhardzhan (Sakha Republic)
- Coordinates: 68°30′N 123°40′E
- Country: Russia
- Federal subject: Sakha Republic
- Administrative district: Zhigansky District
- Rural okrugSelsoviet: Zhigansky Rural Okrug

Population (2010 Census)
  - Total: 1
  - Estimate (2021): 0 (−100%)

Municipal status
  - Municipal district: Zhigansky Municipal District
  - Rural settlement: Zhigansky Rural Settlement
- Postal code: 678330

Dzhardzhan (Russian: Джарджан; Yakut: Дьардьаан, romanized: Carcân) is a now abandoned rural locality (a selo), in Zhigansky Rural Okrug of Zhigansky District in the Sakha Republic, Russia, located 245 kilometers (152 mi) from Zhigansk, the administrative center of the district. Its population as of the 2010 Census was 1, up from 0 recorded during the 2002 Census.

== Geography ==
Dzhardzhan is located on the right side of the confluence of the Dzhardzhan River and the Lena. There is an automatic weather station and an oil storage facility.

== Climate ==
Climate data for Dzhardzhan (extremes 1936–present)
Month	Jan	Feb	Mar	Apr	May	Jun	Jul	Aug	Sep	Oct	Nov	Dec	Year
Record high °C (°F)	−9.5 (14.9)	−4.2 (24.4)	5.6 (42.1)	11.8 (53.2)	28.3 (82.9)	33.7 (92.7)	36.7 (98.1)	31.4 (88.5)	24.7 (76.5)	7.7 (45.9)	0.6 (33.1)	−8.2 (17.2)	36.7 (98.1)
Mean daily maximum °C (°F)	−33.1 (−27.6)	−30.2 (−22.4)	−17.8 (0.0)	−4.1 (24.6)	5.6 (42.1)	17.0 (62.6)	20.5 (68.9)	16.6 (61.9)	7.2 (45.0)	−7.5 (18.5)	−24.8 (−12.6)	−32.8 (−27.0)	−6.9 (19.5)
Daily mean °C (°F)	−36.3 (−33.3)	−34.0 (−29.2)	−23.3 (−9.9)	−10.0 (14.0)	0.9 (33.6)	11.7 (53.1)	15.3 (59.5)	11.6 (52.9)	3.3 (37.9)	−10.6 (12.9)	−28.2 (−18.8)	−35.9 (−32.6)	−11.3 (11.7)
Mean daily minimum °C (°F)	−39.8 (−39.6)	−37.8 (−36.0)	−29.1 (−20.4)	−16.5 (2.3)	−3.9 (25.0)	6.6 (43.9)	10.2 (50.4)	6.8 (44.2)	−0.3 (31.5)	−14.0 (6.8)	−31.8 (−25.2)	−39.0 (−38.2)	−15.7 (3.7)
Record low °C (°F)	−60.3 (−76.5)	−58.9 (−74.0)	−51.8 (−61.2)	−42.7 (−44.9)	−25.0 (−13.0)	−5.9 (21.4)	−0.1 (31.8)	−4.0 (24.8)	−17.1 (1.2)	−40.1 (−40.2)	−54.5 (−66.1)	−60.1 (−76.2)	−60.3 (−76.5)
Average precipitation mm (inches)	14.7 (0.58)	13.6 (0.54)	13.3 (0.52)	12.1 (0.48)	23.7 (0.93)	41.1 (1.62)	53.3 (2.10)	49.0 (1.93)	40.1 (1.58)	39.4 (1.55)	18.5 (0.73)	14.8 (0.58)	333.6 (13.14)
Source: pogoda.ru.net
