= Khoruongka =

River in Yakutia (Sakha Republic), Russia

Khoruongka Хоруонгка / Хоруоҥка
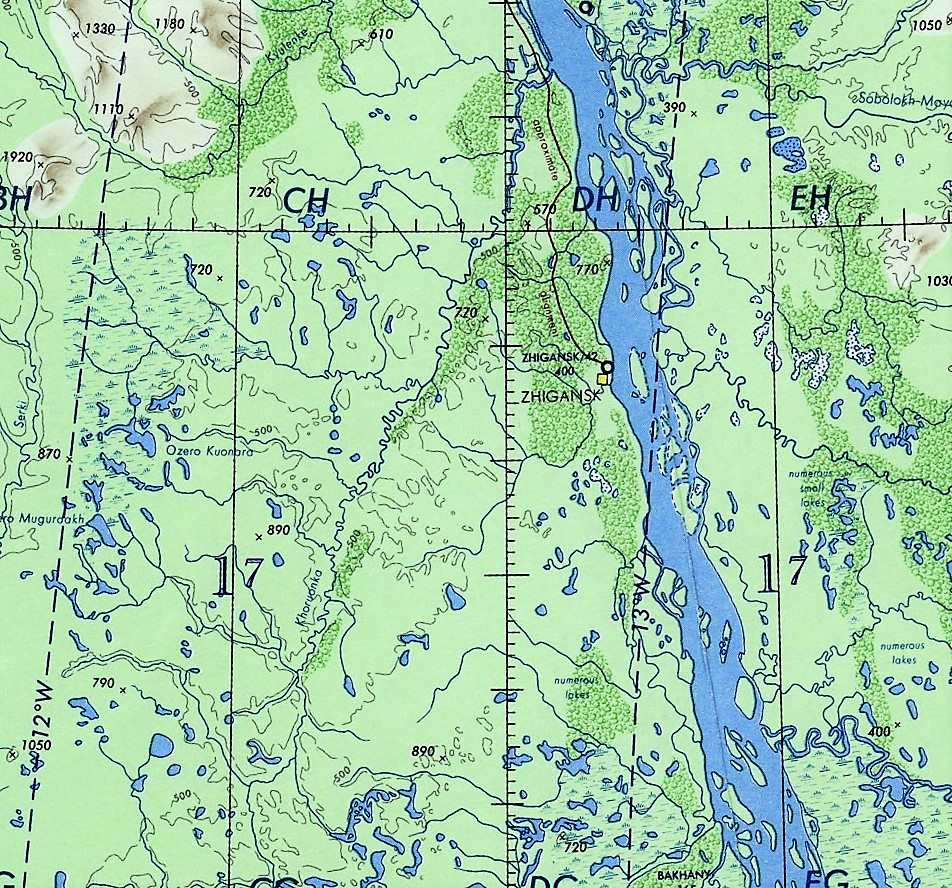
- Course of the Khoruongka

- Mouth location in Yakutia, Russia

Location
- Country: Russia

Physical characteristics
- Source
  - location: Central Yakutian Lowland
  - coordinates: 66°14′11″N 121°41′55″E
  - elevation: ca 169 m (554 ft)
- Mouth: Lena
  - coordinates: 67°13′59″N 123°10′36″E
- Length: 377 km (234 mi)
- Basin size: 8,330 square kilometres (3,220 mi^{2})

Basin features
- Progression: Lena→ Laptev Sea

The Khoruongka (Russian: Хоруонгка, Yakut: Хоруоҥка, Xoruoŋka) is a river in the Sakha Republic (Yakutia), Russia. It is a left tributary of the Lena. Its length is 377 kilometres (234 mi) and the area of its basin is 8,330 square kilometres (3,220 sq mi). The Khoruongka flows across Zhigansky District, not far to the west of Zhigansk town.

The basin of the Khoruongka falls fully within the Central Yakutian Lowland and parts of it are a protected area. The banks of the river are uninhabited.

== Geography ==
The Khoruongka originates in Biedili, a small lake of the Central Yakutian Lowland. It flows first in a SSE direction within a swampy floodplain, then it bends eastwards. After a short stretch it bends again northeastwards, flowing finally almost northwards to the west of the course of the Lena to the north of the Nuora. The area where the Khoruongka flows is dotted with small lakes, especially to the west of its course. The Khoruongka meets the left bank of the Lena 696 kilometres (432 mi) upstream of its mouth in the Laptev Sea. The Sobolokh-Mayan has its mouth approximately on the opposite side of the Lena.

The main tributaries of the Khoruongka are the 82 km (51 mi) long Kyundarimi, the 155 km (96 mi) long Samaldikan and the 79 km (49 mi) long Kirginnyekh, all from the left.

Basin of the Lena

== See also ==
- List of rivers of Russia
