= Motorchuna =

River in Yakutia (Sakha Republic), Russia

Motorchuna Моторчуна
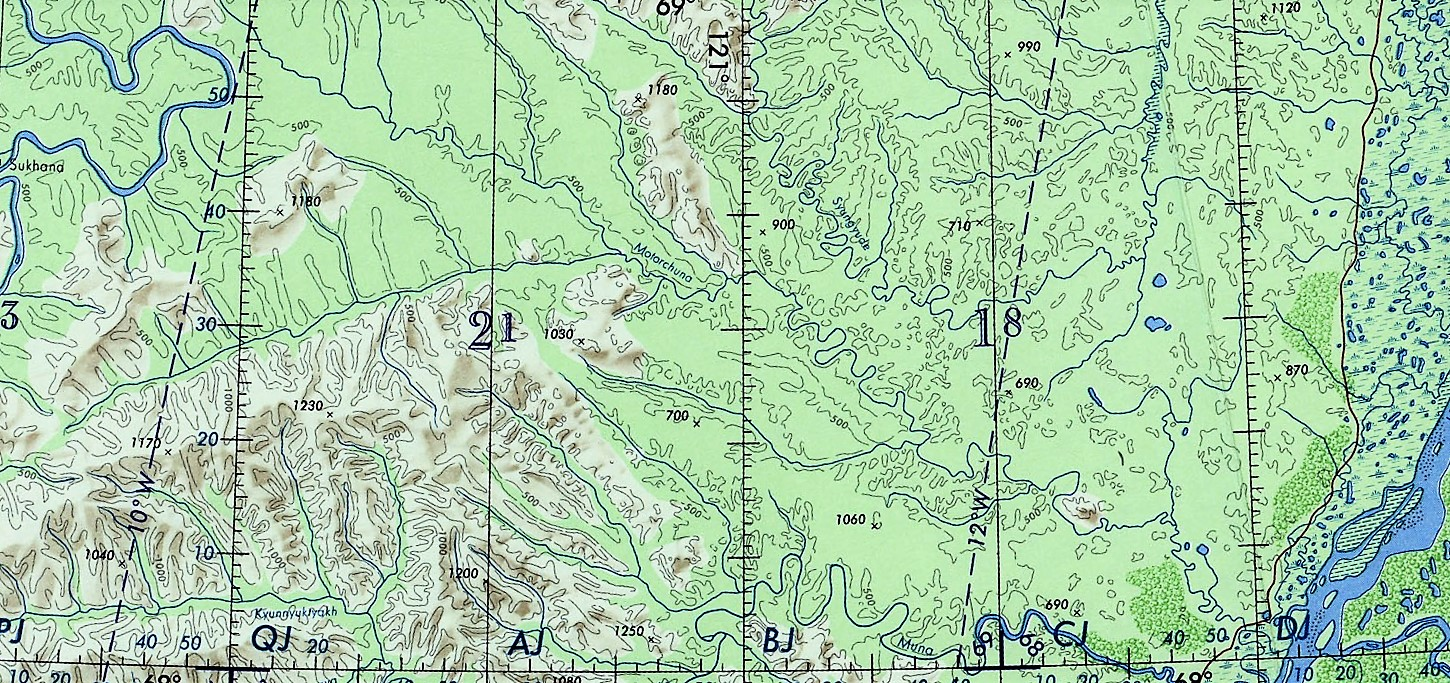
- Course of the Motorchuna map section

- Mouth location in Yakutia, Russia

Location
- Country: Russia

Physical characteristics
- Source
  - location: Central Siberian Plateau
  - coordinates: 68°18′41″N 118°31′45″E
  - elevation: 253 m (830 ft)
- Mouth: Lena
  - location: Zhigansky District
  - coordinates: 68°01′02″N 123°07′08″E
  - elevation: 22 m (72 ft)
- Length: 423 km (263 mi)
- Basin size: 9,250 km^{2} (3,570 sq mi)

Basin features
- Progression: Lena→ Laptev Sea

The Motorchuna (Russian: Моторчуна) is a river in Yakutia (Sakha Republic), Russia. It is a left tributary of the Lena with a length of 423 kilometres (263 mi). Its drainage basin area is 9,250 square kilometres (3,570 mi^{2}). Since its river basin is uninhabited, the Motorchuna is one of the most untouched rivers in Yakutia; the waters are clean and there is abundant wildlife.

The name of the river comes from the Even "mo/tor/chu" (мо/тор/чу), meaning "tree/pass/river".

In the International scale of river difficulty the Motorchuna is a Class II destination for rafting and kayaking.

== Course ==
The sources of the Motorchuna are north of the Polar Circle, in the northeastern slopes of the Central Siberian Plateau, very near the sources of the north-flowing Merchimden. It fringes the plateau area heading in a roughly ENE direction. In mid course it turns slightly and flows across the Central Yakutian Lowland in a roughly ESE direction forming meanders in the floodplain to the south of the Syungyude. The banks in the middle and lower reaches are bound by vertical rocky cliffs. The channel is mostly pebbly. In its last stretch the Motorchuna flows parallel to the Muna further south, in an area of lakes and marshes. Finally it meets the left bank of the Lena, 606 kilometres (377 mi) from its mouth. Its confluence is almost opposite the mouth of the Menkere on the facing bank.

The Motorchuna is fed by rain and snow. It freezes in mid-October and stays under ice until late May or early June.

=== Tributaries ===
The Motorchuna has fifty tributaries that are over 10 km (6.2 mi) in length. The longest ones are the 147 km (91 mi) long Byuger-Yuryach and the 132 km (82 mi) long Kuogas-Uluybut, both joining it from the left.

== Flora and fauna ==
Thickets of golden root and Rhododendron adamsii grow on the banks on the Motorchuna. In certain places there are dense shrubs growing near the water and in the banks of the lower course there are willows. Often birds and mammals hide in the vegetation. Elk, wolf, willow ptarmigan, bean goose and greater white-fronted goose are common near the river.

The main fish species are pike, perch, lenok, taimen, grayling, burbot, whitefish and nelma, among others.

== See also ==
- List of rivers of Russia
