= Nuora (Lena) =

River in Yakutia (Sakha Republic), Russia

Nuora (Strekalovka) Нуора (Стрекаловка)
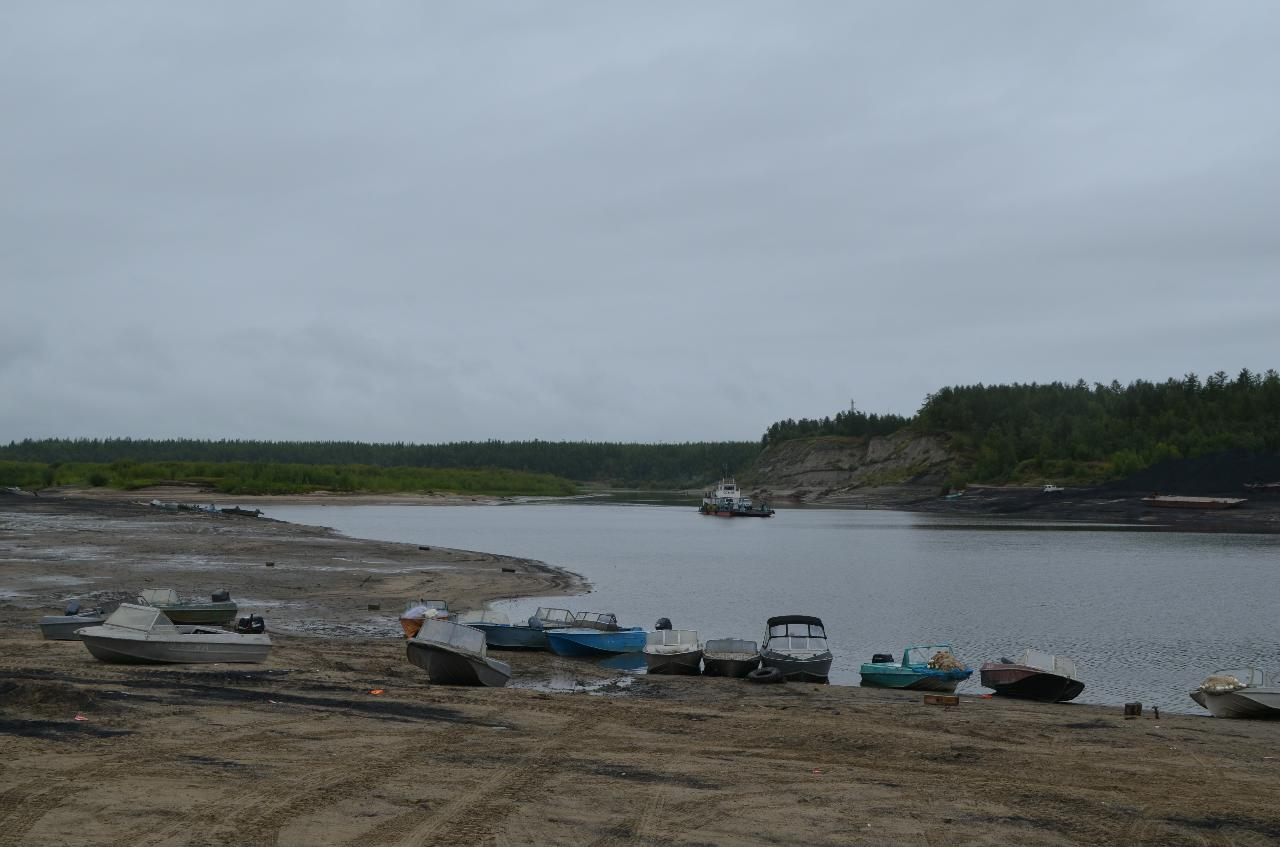
- The Nuora near its mouth

- Mouth location in Yakutia, Russia

Location
- Country: Russian Federation
- Federal subject: Yakutia
- District: Zhigansky District

Physical characteristics
- Source
  - location: Central Yakutian Lowland
  - coordinates: 66°33′58″N 122°53′51″E
  - elevation: 82 m (269 ft)
- Mouth: Lena
  - location: Zhigansk
  - coordinates: 66°46′31″N 123°22′52″E
  - elevation: 30 m (98 ft)
- Length: 69 km (43 mi)
- Basin size: 1,110 km^{2} (430 sq mi)

Basin features
- Progression: Lena→ Laptev Sea

The Nuora (Russian: Нуора or "Нуорда" —now obsolete), also known as Strekalovka (Russian: Стрекаловка) is a river in Yakutia (Sakha Republic), Russia. It is a left tributary of the Lena with a length of 69 kilometres (43 mi). Its drainage basin area is 1,110 square kilometres (430 mi^{2}).

The river flows across Zhigansky District and has its mouth by Zhigansk, the district capital.

== Course ==
The Nuora is a minor left tributary of the Lena. It has its sources in an area of lakes, the largest of which is Lake Taryn (Озеро Тарын), in the northern area of the Central Yakutian Lowland. It is formed at the confluence of two small rivers, the 20 km (12 mi) long Aly-Nuora and the 28 km (17 mi) long Bestyakh-Nuora. It flows in a roughly northeastern direction forming meanders in the floodplain to the south of the Khoruongka. Finally it meets the left bank of the Lena at Zhigansk, 754 kilometres (469 mi) from its mouth.

The river is fed by rain and snow. It freezes in mid-October and stays under ice until late May or early June. Its main tributaries are the 28 km (17 mi) long Bestyakh-Nuora from the right and the 30 km (19 mi) long Povarnya from the left.

== See also ==
- List of rivers of Russia
