= Sobolokh-Mayan =

River in Russia

Sobolokh-Mayan Yakut: Соболоох Майаан
- Mouth location in Yakutia, Russia

Location
- Country: Russia

Physical characteristics
- Source
  - location: Orulgan Range
  - coordinates: 67°30′10″N 128°27′05″E
  - elevation: 1,500 m (4,900 ft)
- Mouth: Lena
  - coordinates: 67°14′04″N 123°22′48″E
  - elevation: 27 m (89 ft)
- Length: 411 km (255 mi)
- Basin size: 13,300 km^{2} (5,100 sq mi)
- Discharge
  - average: 136 m^{3}/s (4,800 cu ft/s)

Basin features
- Progression: Lena→ Laptev Sea

The Sobolokh-Mayan (Russian: Соболоох-Майан; Yakut: Соболоох Майаан, Soboloox Mayaan) is a river in Sakha Republic (Yakutia), Russia. It is the 20th longest tributary of the Lena, with a length of 411 kilometres (255 mi) and a drainage basin area of 13,300 square kilometres (5,100 mi^{2}).

Lenok, taimen and whitefish are found in the waters of the Sobolokh-Mayan. There are no settlements by the river.

== Course ==
The Sobolokh-Mayan is a right tributary of the Lena. Its source is located in the northern sector of the Verkhoyansk Range, at an altitude of roughly 1,500 m (4,900 ft) on the western slope of the Orulgan Range, with its valley flanking the northern side of the Byrandia Range in its upper course. In its first section the Sobolokh-Mayan flows across mountainous terrain. After leaving the mountains it flows into the Central Yakutian Lowland, forming meanders in the flat permafrost floodplain, until it joins the right bank of the Lena 700 km (430 mi) from its mouth, near the mouth of the Khoruongka in the opposite bank.

Its longest tributary is the 254 km (158 mi) long Nyimingde.

== See also ==
- List of rivers of Russia
