= Muna (Lena) =

River in Sakha Republic, Russia

Muna Муна
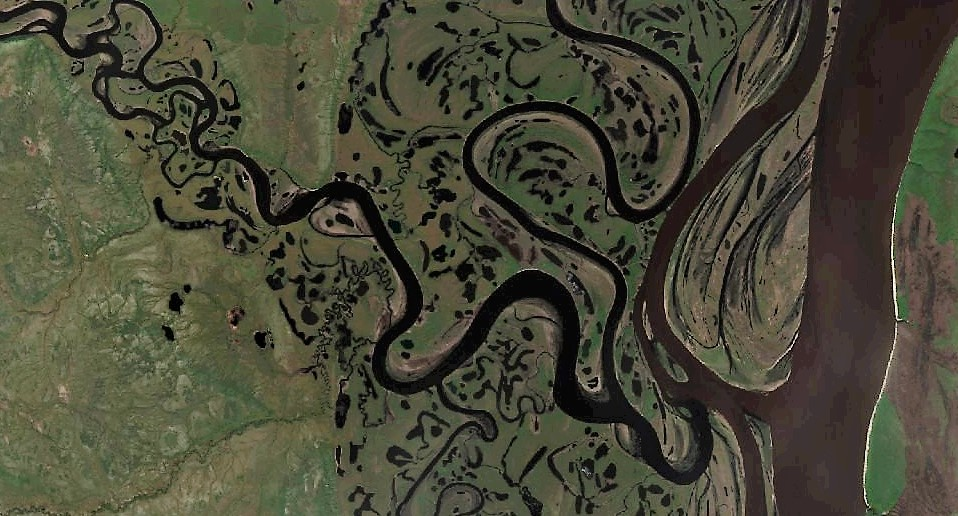
- Mouth of the Muna in the Lena Sentinel-2 image

- Location in Yakutia, Russia

Location
- Country: Yakutia, Russia

Physical characteristics
- Source
  - location: Central Siberian Plateau
  - coordinates: 67°07′51″N 113°54′50″E
  - elevation: 332 m (1,089 ft)
- Mouth: Lena
  - coordinates: 67°53′32″N 123°01′49″E
  - elevation: 23 m (75 ft)
- Length: 715 km (444 mi)
- Basin size: 30,100 km^{2} (11,600 sq mi)
- Discharge
  - average: 40 m^{3}/s (1,400 cu ft/s)

Basin features
- Progression: Lena→ Laptev Sea

The Muna (Russian: Муна) is a river in Yakutia (Sakha Republic), Russia. It is a left tributary of the lower reaches of the Lena and has a length of 715 km (444 mi).

== Course ==
The river begins a little to the north of the Polar Circle at the confluence of the small rivers Orto-Muna and Ulakhan-Muna in the northeastern slopes of the Central Siberian Plateau at an elevation of 332 metres (1,089 ft). It flows roughly eastwards in a deep valley and, after leaving the mountainous region it meanders across the Central Yakutian Lowland among almost 2,500 lakes, nearly parallel to the Motorchuna to the north. The river broadens in the plain, reaching a width of 300 m (980 ft) when it meets the left bank of the lower course of the Lena 606 km (377 mi) from its mouth, a little to the north of the mouth of the Kyuelenke.

The Muna freezes between the end of November and the beginning of December and remains under ice until the end of April or the beginning of May. From the end of May to June it flows at a high level, flooding sometimes in the summer. The area of the river basin is uninhabited. The mouth of the river is in the Zhigansky District.

=== Tributaries ===
The main tributaries of the Muna are the 201 km (125 mi) long Munakan and the 221 km (137 mi) long Khakhchan on the right and the 238 km (148 mi) long Severnaya on the left.

Basin of the Lena

== See also ==
- List of rivers of Russia
