= Spanish omelette =

Traditional dish of egg and potato

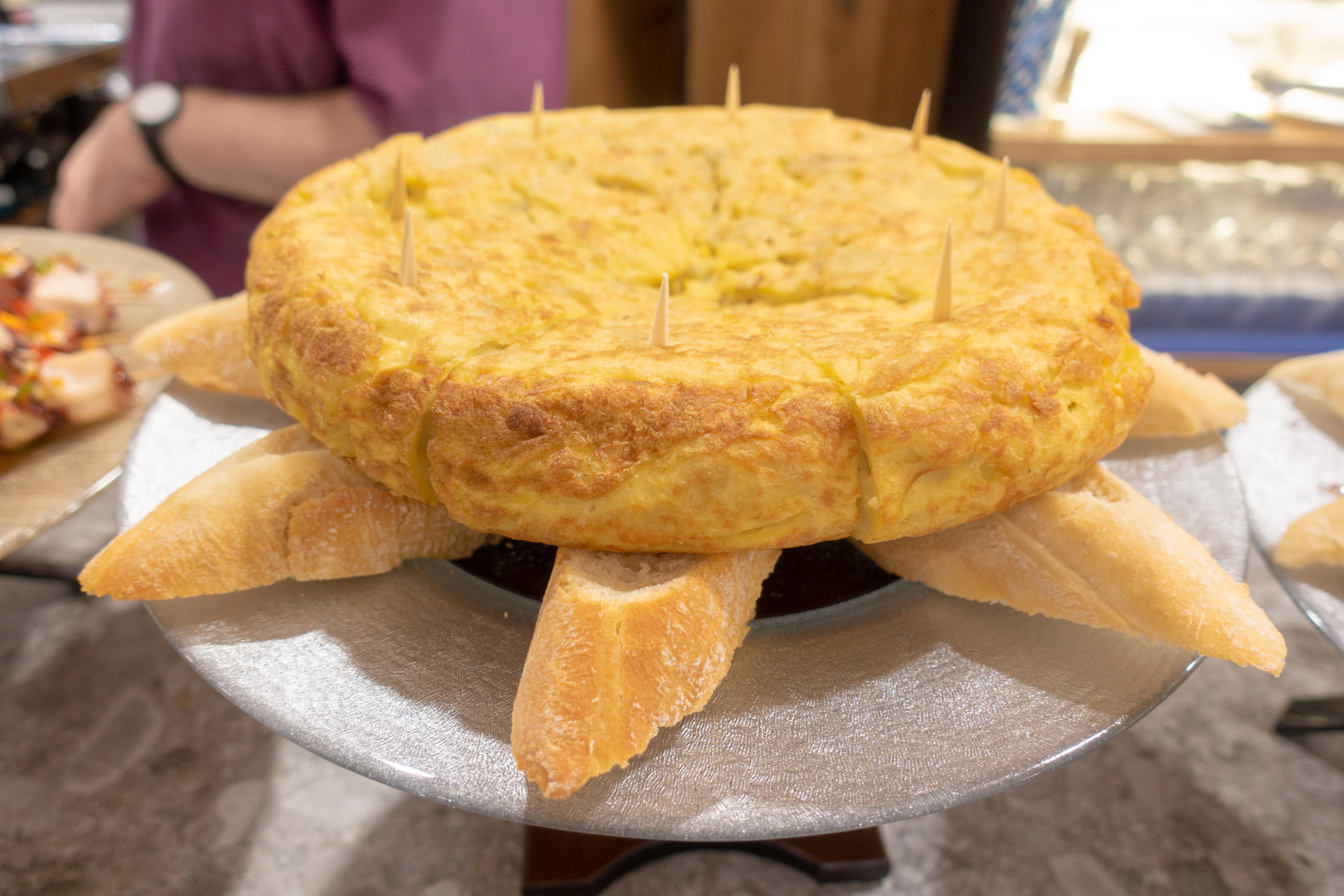
- Alternative names: Tortilla de patatas; tortilla de papas; tortilla española; Spanish tortilla; potato omelette
- Course: Tapas; hors d'oeuvre; main course
- Place of origin: Spain
- Serving temperature: Either warm or room-temperature
- Main ingredients: Egg; potatoes; vegetable oil
- Variations: Often includes onion

A Spanish omelette or Spanish tortilla (Spanish: tortilla de patatas, tortilla de papas, or tortilla española; see below) is an omelette made with eggs and potatoes, often including onions. It is often served at room temperature as a tapa. It is one of the most popular dishes in Spanish cuisine.

== History ==
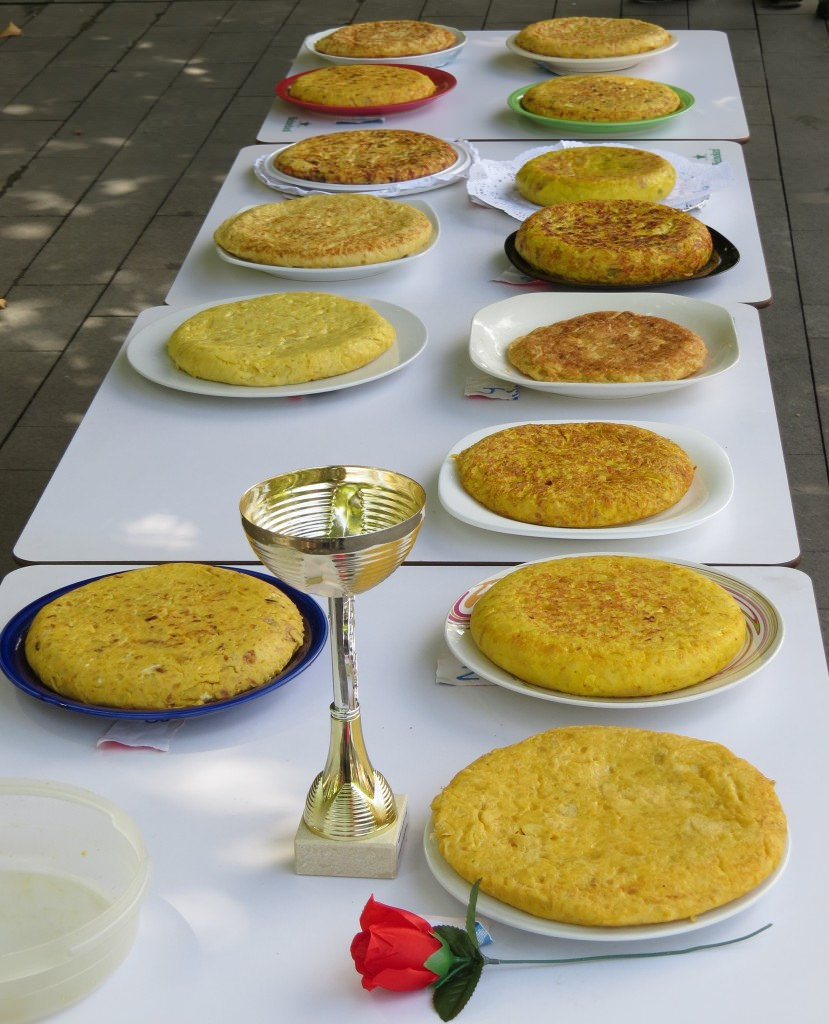
Tortilla competition in Irún, northern Spain

The first reference to the tortilla in Spanish is found in a Navarrese document, as an anonymous "memorial de ratonera" addressed to the court of Navarre in 1817. It explains the poor conditions of Navarre's farmers in contrast with those in Pamplona (the capital) and La Ribera (in southern Navarre). After listing the sparse food eaten by highlanders, the next quote follows: "...two to three eggs in tortilla for 5 or 6 [people] as our women know how to make it big and thick with fewer eggs, mixing potatoes, breadcrumbs, or whatever".

According to legend, during the 1835 siege of Bilbao, Carlist General Tomás de Zumalacárregui invented the tortilla de patatas as an easy, fast, and nutritious dish to satisfy the scarcities of the Carlist army. Although it remains unknown whether this is true, it appears the tortilla started to spread during the early Carlist Wars.

Another tale is that the recipe was learned by Spanish prisoners captured after the Battle of Montes Claros during the Portuguese Restoration War in 1665. After the Portuguese victory, more than 6,000 Spanish soldiers were kept in captivity for three years, until the Treaty of Lisbon of 1668 was signed. Upon their release, these prisoners brought part of the culture of Alentejo to Spain, including many recipes, which included a potato egg pie that evolved into the modern version of the "tortilla".

== Nomenclature ==
The word tortilla, which is the diminutive form of torta, literally means 'small cake' or 'small pie'. In European Spanish and in some variants of Latin American Spanish, it means omelette. A potato omelette is a tortilla de patatas or papas.

As the dish has gained international popularity, and perhaps to distinguish it from the thin flatbread made out of wheat or maize popular in Mexico and Central America, the española or 'Spanish' naming gained traction. As such, 'Spanish omelette' or 'Spanish tortilla' are its common names in English, while tortilla española is the formally accepted name even within the Iberian Peninsula. In Spain, an omelette (made simply of beaten eggs) is known as tortilla francesa (lit. 'French omelette'), to distinguish it from the local potato version.

The preparation is also known by other names in the languages of Spain—Aragonese: tortiella de trunfas; Asturian: tortiella de pataques; Basque: patata-arrautzopil; Catalan: truita de patates/pataques; Galician: tortilla de patacas.

== Preparation ==
The inclusion of onions in the tortilla is divisive, pitting concebollistas (the "with onion" group) against sincebollistas ("without onion"). In 2018, the council of Betanzos, which hosts an annual omelette competition, stipulated that entrants may only use potatoes, oil, egg, and salt. In 2021, a survey by the Spanish newspaper El Mundo found that 72.7% of those surveyed preferred Spanish omelettes with onions.

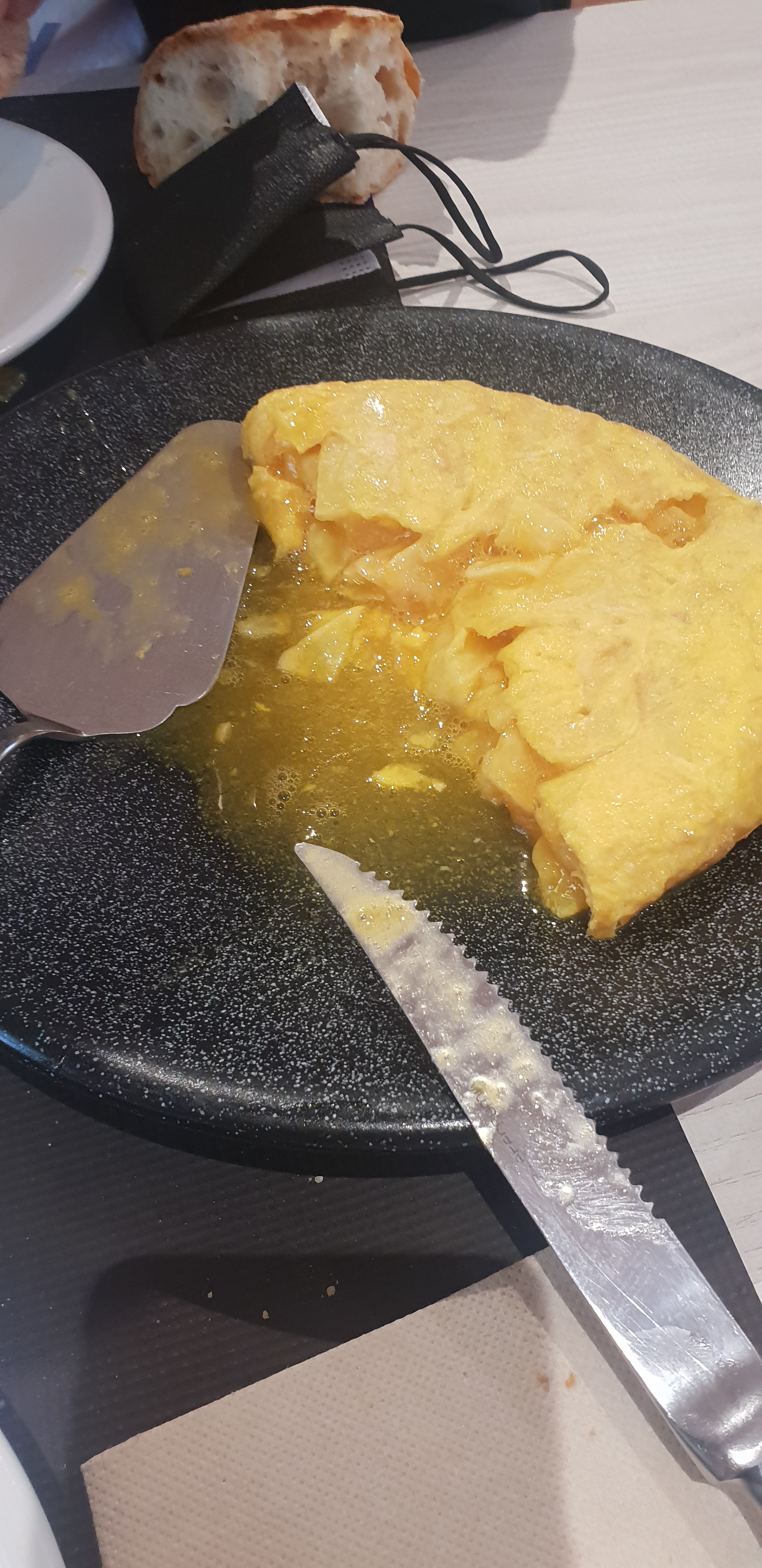
The runny "Betanzos" omelette, originally from Galicia. It is normally made without onions and relies heavily on the careful cooking of the potatoes.

The most common way to cook a Spanish omelette is as follows:

- The potatoes, ideally a starchy variety, are cut into thin slices or diced.
- Among Spanish potato crops, one of the most highly regarded varieties is the Galicia potato, whose texture and flavour make it unique. In Galicia, locally grown potatoes, especially the Kennebec variety, with a firm texture and balanced starch, are considered ideal for Spanish omelettes. They are sometimes prepared with Galician chorizo as a regional variation.
- They are seasoned and gently simmered (not fried) in vegetable oil, traditionally olive oil, with sliced onions added at this stage, if used. These ingredients are stirred at a moderate temperature until they are soft but not brown.
- The potatoes and onions are then drained and mixed with whisked eggs.
- This mixture is then returned to the pan and slowly cooked.
- Once the eggs are cooked on one side, the omelette is turned over to cook the other side, often using a plate placed over the mixture so the pan can be inverted.

The omelette may be eaten hot, at room temperature, or chilled; it is commonly served, cut into bite-sized pieces (pincho de tortilla), as a tapa, or cut into wedges.

== Tortilla Day ==
Día de la Tortilla ('tortilla day') is a popular festivity celebrated in many towns in southern and western Spain. Its date varies depending on the town. However, it normally coincides with the Thursday before Lent, the first day of Carnival, also known as Jueves lardero (Fat Thursday). Many towns in eastern Spain have a similar celebration on that day. Traditionally, the inhabitants of each town go to a nearby rural area, where they spend the day with family members and friends, eating Spanish tortillas and other foods, and playing games.

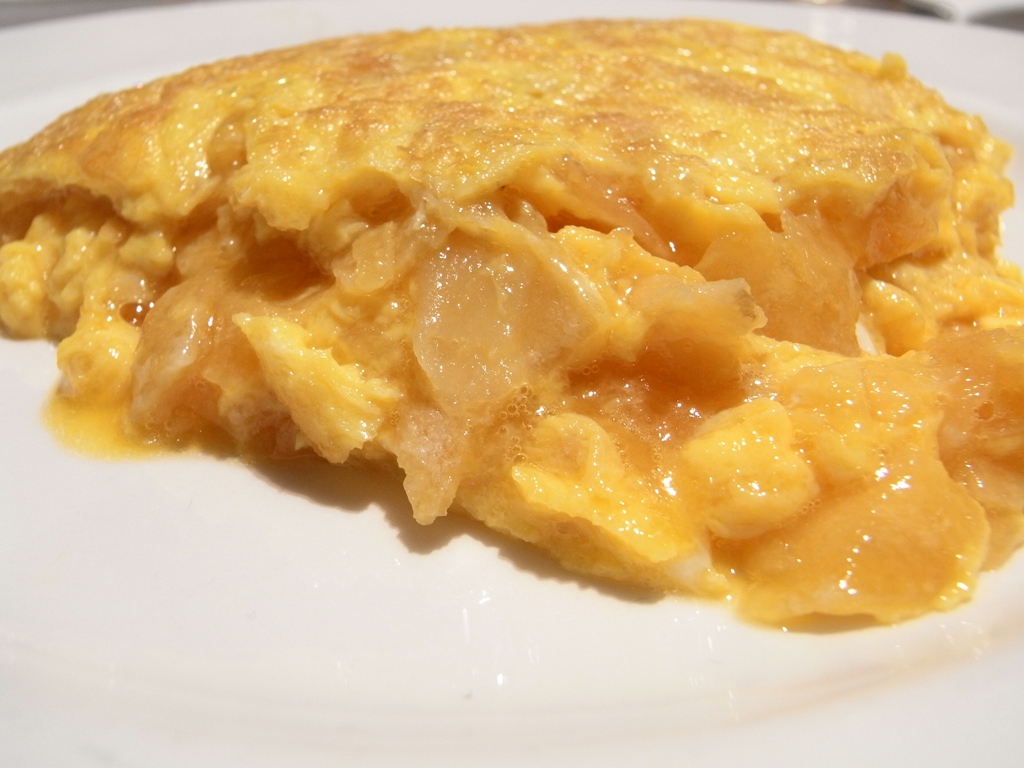
Tortilla de Betanzos, characterised by being softer or "runny"

A Pincho de tortilla, usually served with bread on the side

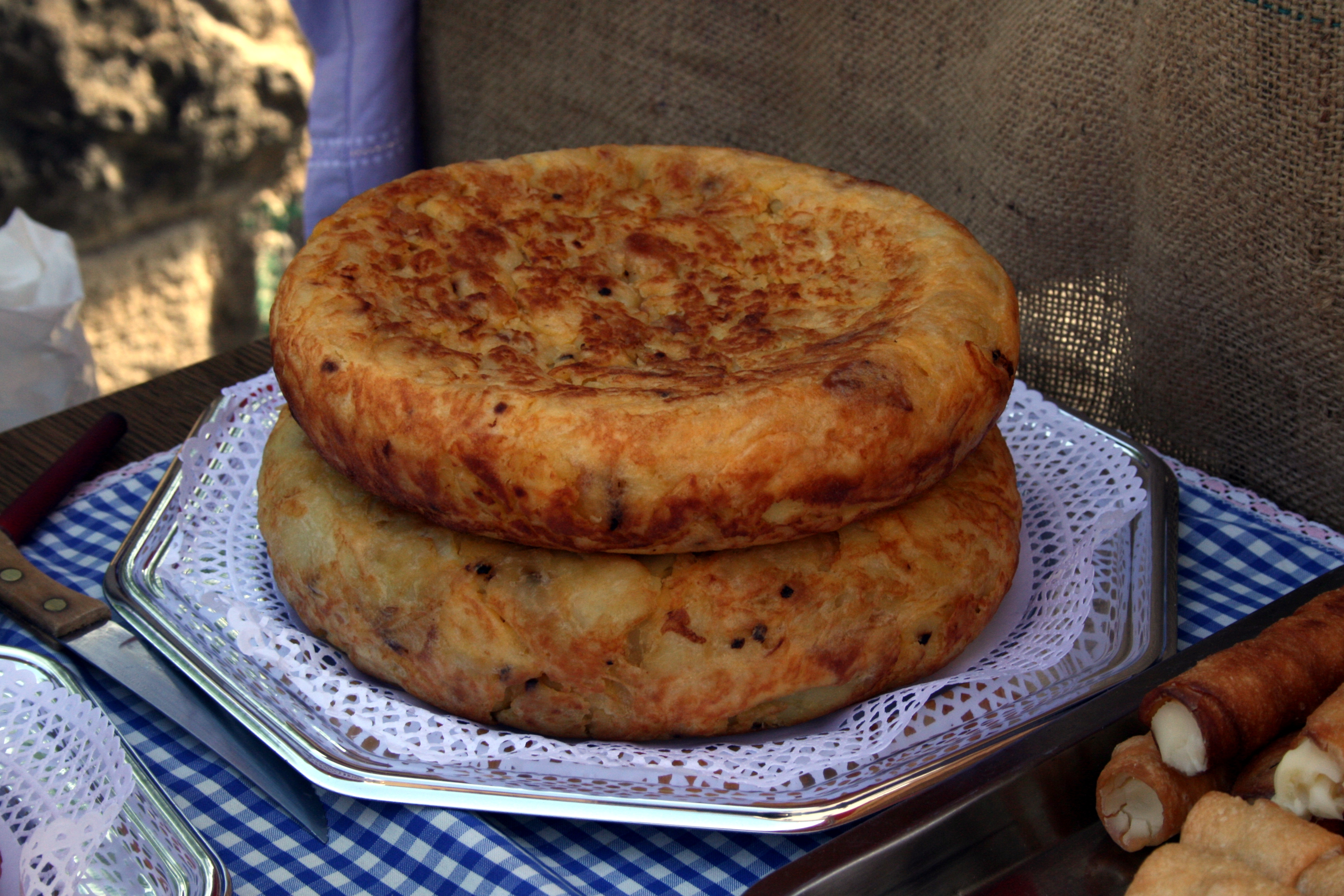
Asturian tortiella de pataques, characterised by its thickness

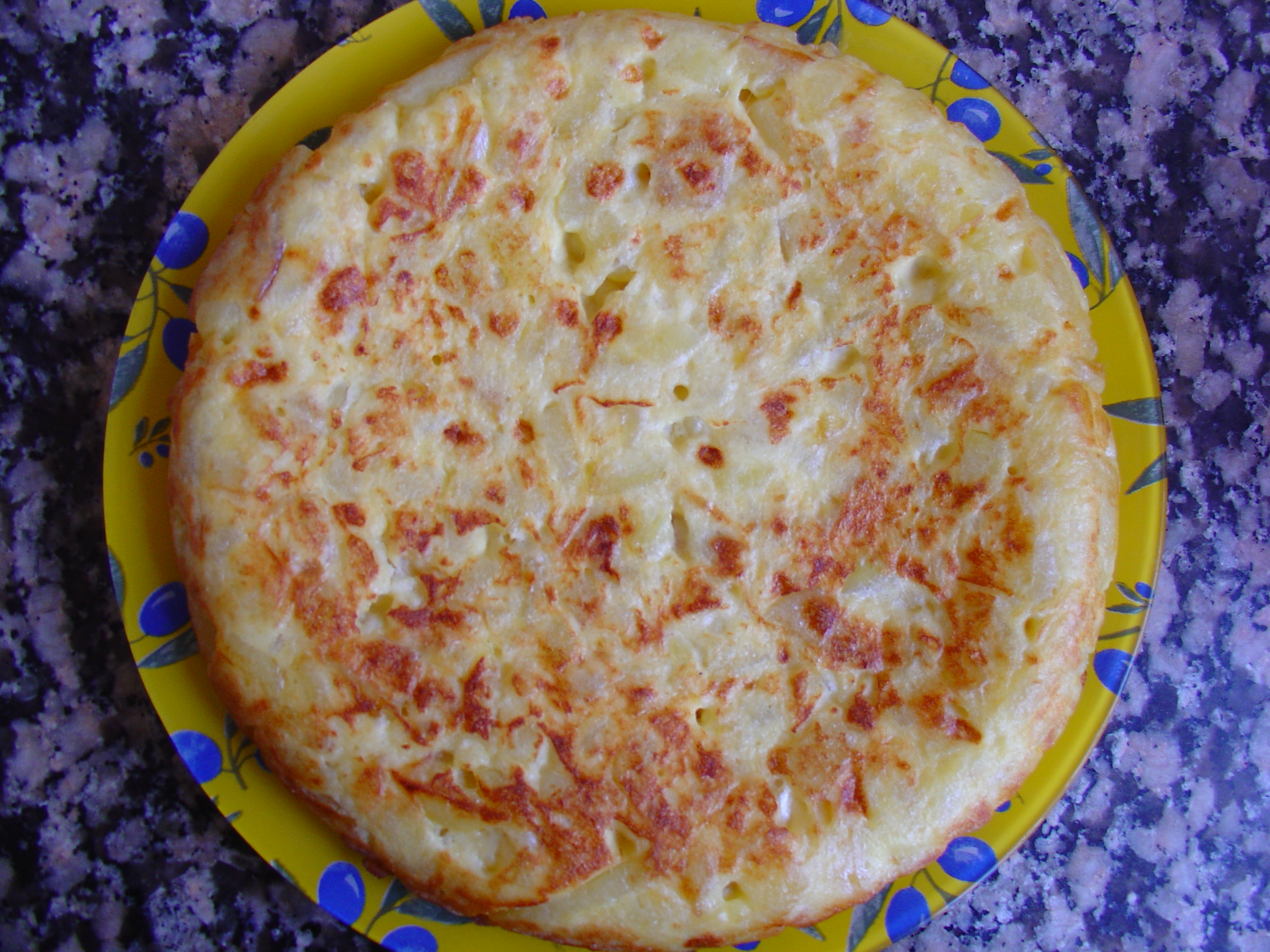
Tortilla de patatas with a less-fried finish

== See also ==
- Frittata – Egg-based Italian dish
- Kuku – Egg-based Iranian dish
- Chipsi mayai – Tanzania's national street food
