= Zhigansk Airport =

- IATA: ZIX; ICAO: UEVV

Summary
- Airport type: Public
- Serves: Zhigansk, Zhigansky District, Sakha Republic, Russia
- Elevation AMSL: 89 m / 292 ft
- Coordinates: 66°47′48″N 123°21′41″E

Maps
- Sakha Republic in Russia

- Location of the airport in the Sakha Republic

Runways
| Direction | Length | | Surface |
| Direction | m | ft | Surface |
|---|---|---|---|
| 17/35 | 1,100 | 3,609 | Asphalt |
- Source: OurAirports, GCM, STV

Zhigansk Airport (IATA: ZIX, ICAO: UEVV) is an airport serving the urban locality of Zhigansk, Zhigansky District, in the Sakha Republic of Russia.

== Airlines and destinations ==
| Airlines | Destinations |
|---|---|
| Yakutia | Yakutsk |

== See also ==
- List of airports in Russia
