= Kyuelenke =

River in Yakutia (Sakha Republic), Russia

Kyuelenke Кюеленке / Кююлээнкэ
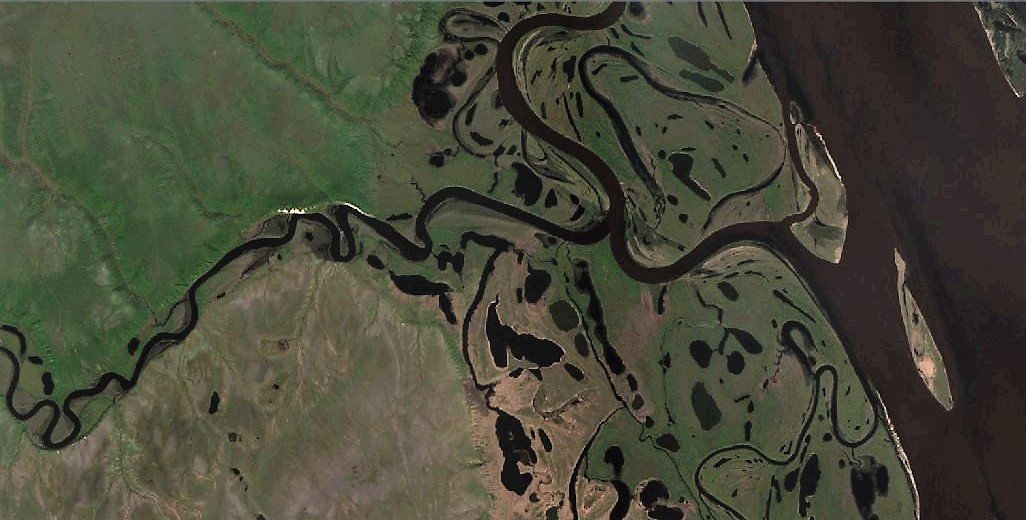
- Mouth of the Kyuelenke in the Lena Sentinel-2 image.

- Mouth location in Yakutia, Russia

Location
- Country: Russia

Physical characteristics
- Source
  - location: Central Siberian Plateau
  - coordinates: 67°21′48″N 120°43′22″E
- Mouth: Lena
  - location: Zhigansky District
  - coordinates: 67°28′03″N 122°56′06″E
- Length: 211 km (131 mi)
- Basin size: 4,090 km^{2} (1,580 sq mi)

Basin features
- Progression: Lena→ Laptev Sea

The Kyuelenke (Russian: Кюеленке; Yakut: Кююлээнкэ) is a river in Yakutia (Sakha Republic), Russia. It is a left tributary of the Lena with a length of 211 kilometres (131 mi). Its drainage basin area is 4,090 square kilometres (1,580 mi^{2}).

The river flows across desolate areas of Zhigansky District.

== Course ==
The sources of the Kyuelenke are north of the Polar Circle, on the eastern slopes of the Central Siberian Plateau. It heads in a roughly southeastern direction. Halfway through its course it turns and flows northeastwards across the Central Yakutian Lowland forming meanders in the floodplain. In its last stretch the river bends slightly and flows eastwards in an area of lakes and marshes. Finally it meets a channel of the left bank of the Lena, 620 kilometres (390 mi) from its mouth. Its confluence lies to the south of the mouth of the Muna.

The Kyuelenke freezes in the first half of October and stays under ice until late May or early June.

=== Tributaries ===
The main tributaries of the Kyuelenke are the 87 km (54 mi) long Orto-Kyuelenke and the 77 km (48 mi) long Syukeldzhen (Сюкэлдьэн), both joining it from the left.

== See also ==
- List of rivers of Russia
