= Pupelde Airfield =

Airport in Ancud, Chile

Pupelde Airport
- IATA: ZUD; ICAO: SCAC

Summary
- Airport type: Public
- Serves: Ancud, Chile
- Elevation AMSL: 315 ft / 96 m
- Coordinates: 41°54′15″S 73°47′48″W

Map
- Location of Pupelde Airport in Chile

Runways
Direction	Length		Surface
Direction	m	ft	Surface
17/35	1,605	5,266	Concrete, asphalt
- Source: Landings.com, Google Maps, GCM

Pupelde Airport (Spanish: Aeródromo Pupelde, (IATA: ZUD, ICAO: SCAC)) is an airport serving Ancud, a Pacific port city in the Los Lagos Region of Chile. Ancud is on the northern shore of Chiloé Island.

The Mocopulli VOR-DME (Ident: MPI) is located 26.5 nautical miles (49.1 km) south of the airport.

== See also ==
- Transport in Chile
- List of airports in Chile
