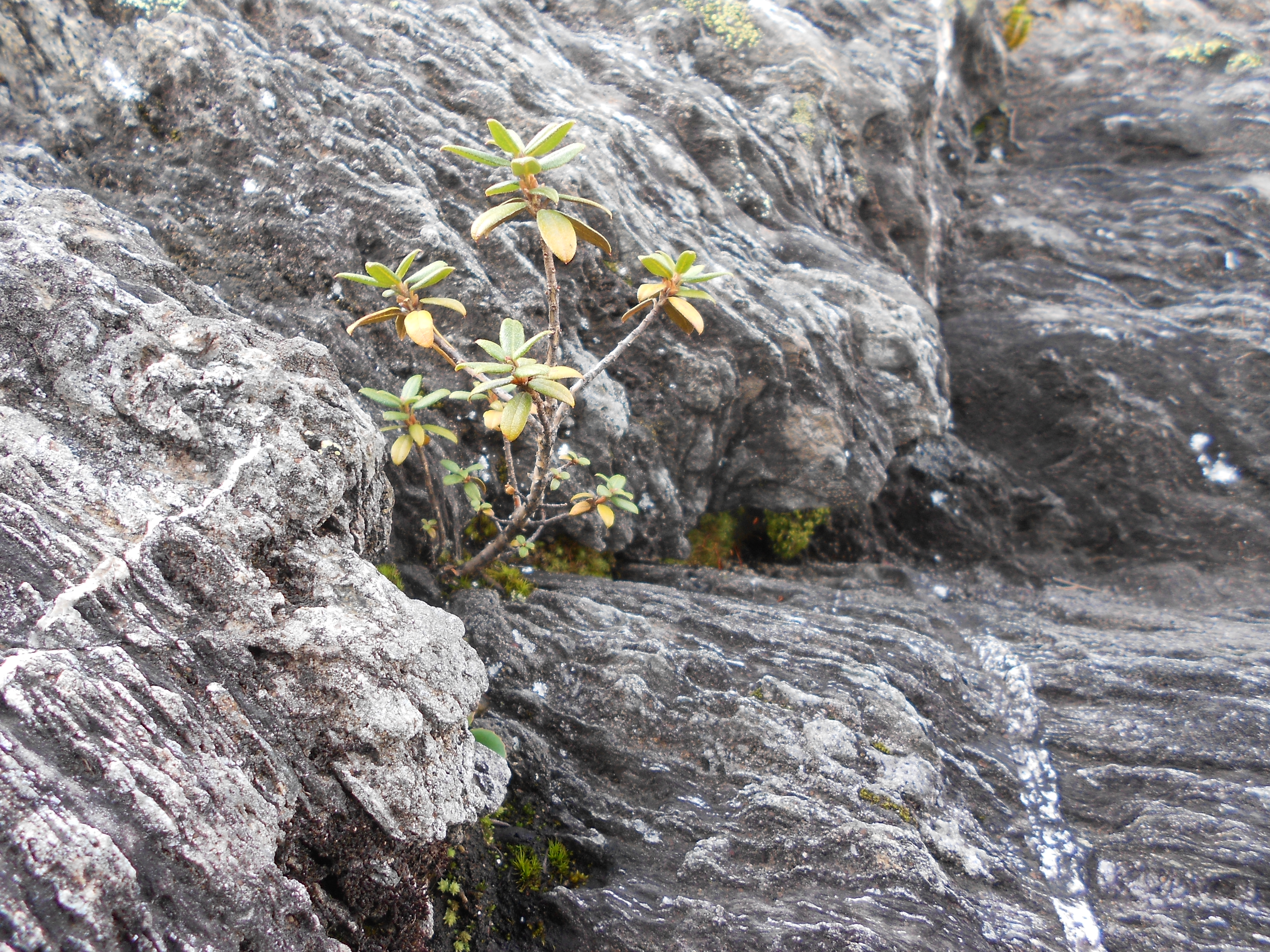

Scientific classification
- Kingdom: Plantae
- Clade: Tracheophytes
- Clade: Angiosperms
- Clade: Eudicots
- Clade: Asterids
- Order: Ericales
- Family: Ericaceae
- Genus: Rhododendron
- Species: R. adamsii

Binomial name
- Rhododendron adamsii Rehder

= Rhododendron adamsii =

Species of flowering plant

Rhododendron adamsii is a flowering plant species in the genus Rhododendron.

The plant has been cultivated in the Moscow Botanical Garden of Academy of Sciences since 1964. In the Buryat language R. adamsii is known as sagaan dali (сагаан дали) and is used to prepare a certain kind of herbal tea.

== Phytochemistry ==
R. adamsii contains cannabigerorcynic acid and cannabigerorcynic acid methylester which are structurally related to Cannabigerol and Cannabichromene.

== Distribution ==
It is found in Eastern Siberia, Yakutia, Transbaikalia and Mongolia. In the Russian Far East it is found on the coast of the Sea of Okhotsk, on the Schmidt Peninsula of Sakhalin, as well as in the upper reaches of the Selemdzha and Bureya rivers.

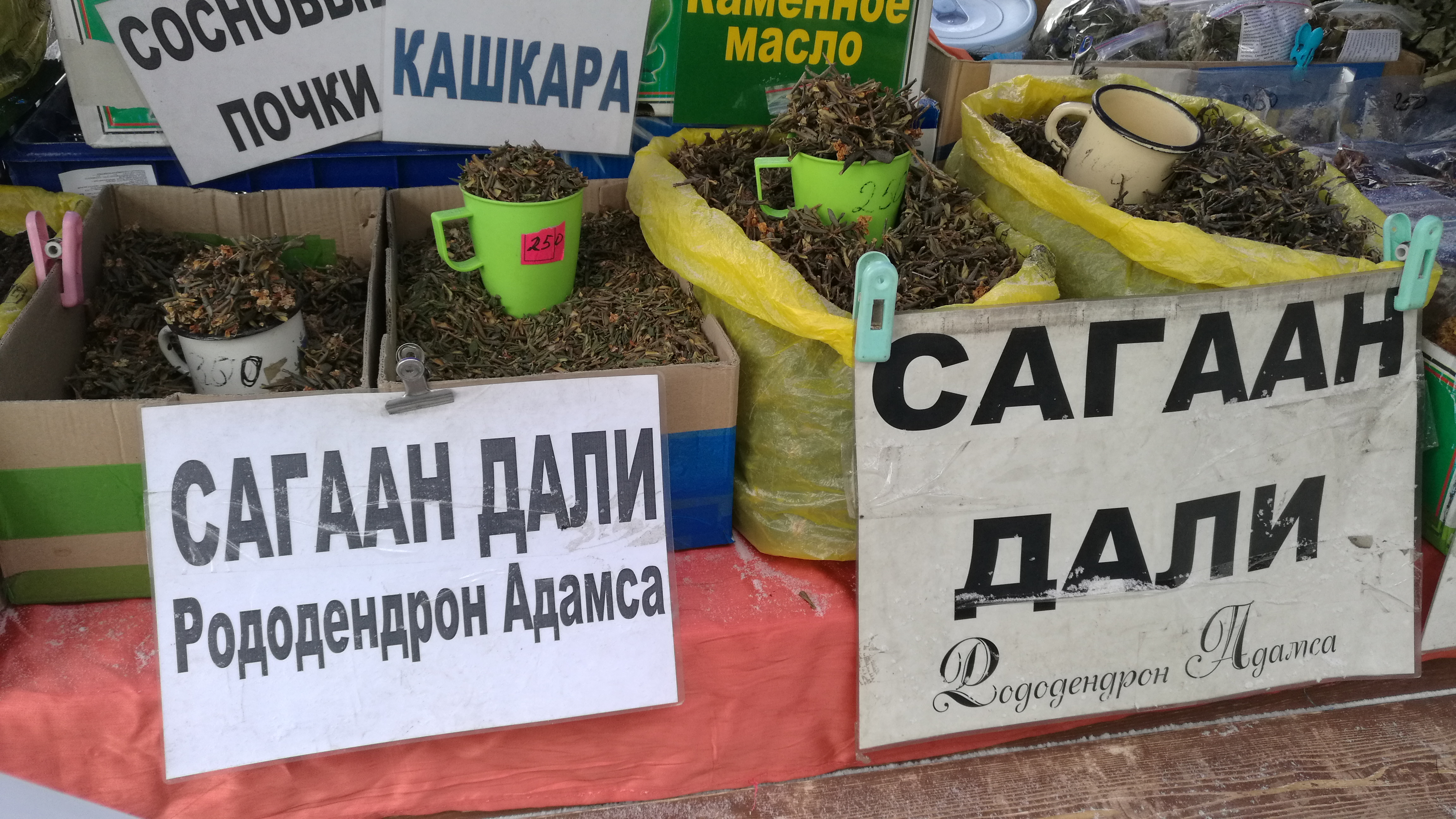
R. adamsii at a market in Irkutsk, Russia.
