= Victoria Airport (Chile) =

- IATA: ZIC; ICAO: SCTO

Summary
- Airport type: Public
- Location: Victoria, Chile
- Elevation AMSL: 1,148 ft / 350 m
- Coordinates: 38°14′45″S 72°20′55″W

Map
- Location in Chile

Runways
Direction	Length		Surface
Direction	m	ft	Surface
01/19	1,050	3,445	Asphalt
- Sources: WAD GCM Google Maps

Victoria Airport (IATA: ZIC, ICAO: SCTO) is an airport serving Victoria, a town in the Araucanía Region of Chile. The airport is on the southwest side of the town.

== See also ==
- Transport in Chile
- List of airports in Chile
