= Chipsi mayai =

Tanzania's national street food

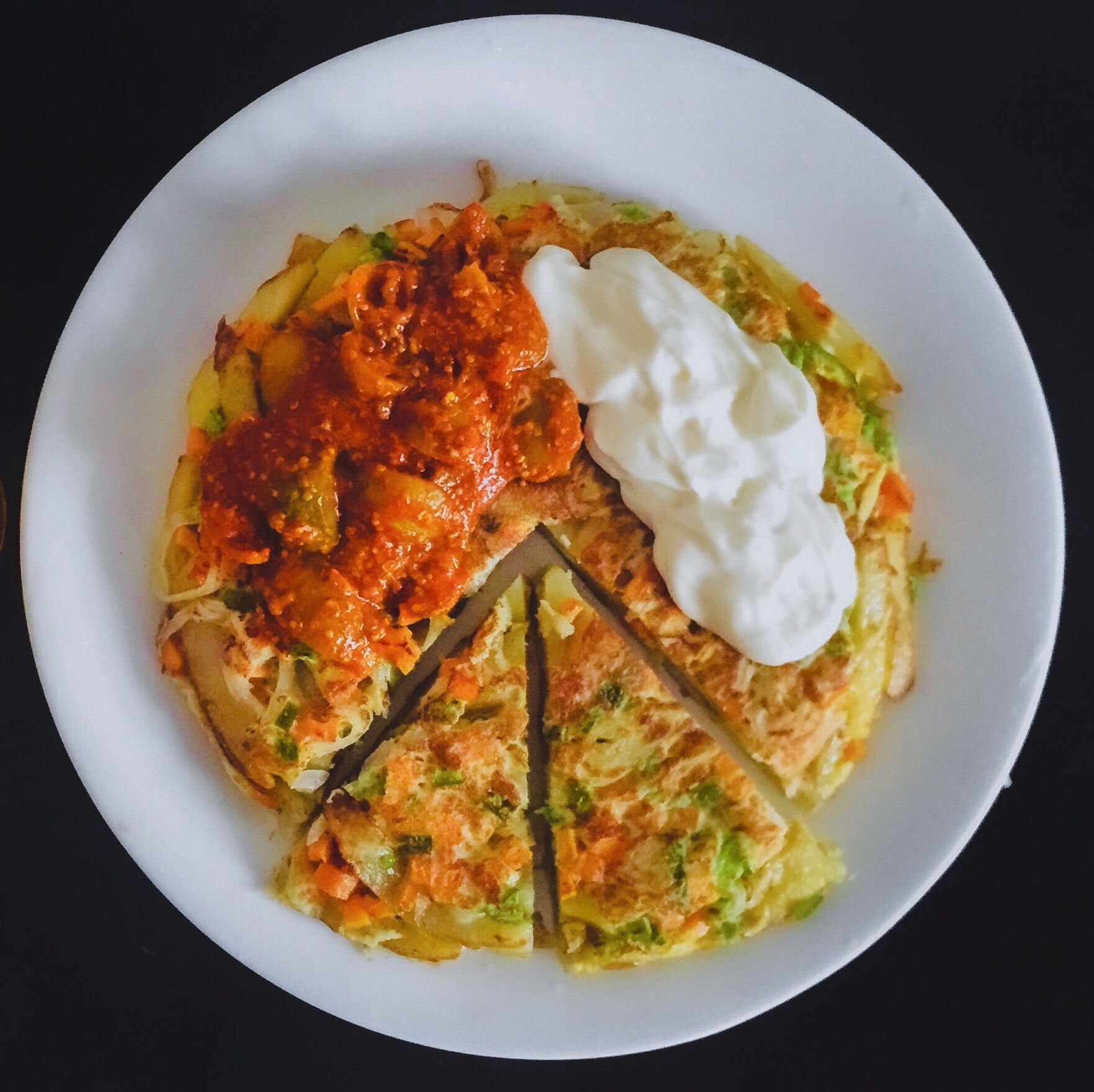
- Chipsi mayai (zege)
- Place of origin: Dar Es Salaam, United Republic of Tanzania.: Invented, 1980s
- Main ingredients: Potatoes, eggs
- Variations: Eggs can be mixed with onions, bell pepper, and other ingredients

Chipsi mayai (Swahili for "chips and eggs"), also known as zege, is the most popular street food found all over Tanzania. The dish was invented in the streets of Dar es Salaam. In its most basic form, chipsi mayai is a simple potato-egg omelette. It is available in all regions of Tanzania, from the most remote villages to large towns. Food stands both indoors and on streets make them to order. It is the unofficial national dish of the country.

It is generally prepared with chips (French fries), oil and beaten eggs fried together in a pan. It is often served with kachumbari or pili-pili, which can be any type of hot sauce.

== See also ==
- List of egg dishes
- Tortilla española – Traditional dish of egg and potato

== Bibliography ==
- Rachel Khong (2017). Lucky Peach All About Eggs: Everything We Know About the World's Most Important Food. Potter/Ten Speed/Harmony/Rodale. p. 78. ISBN 978-0804187763.
