= Ulakhan-Kyuel =

Lake in Russia

- Улахан Кюель / Улахан Күөл
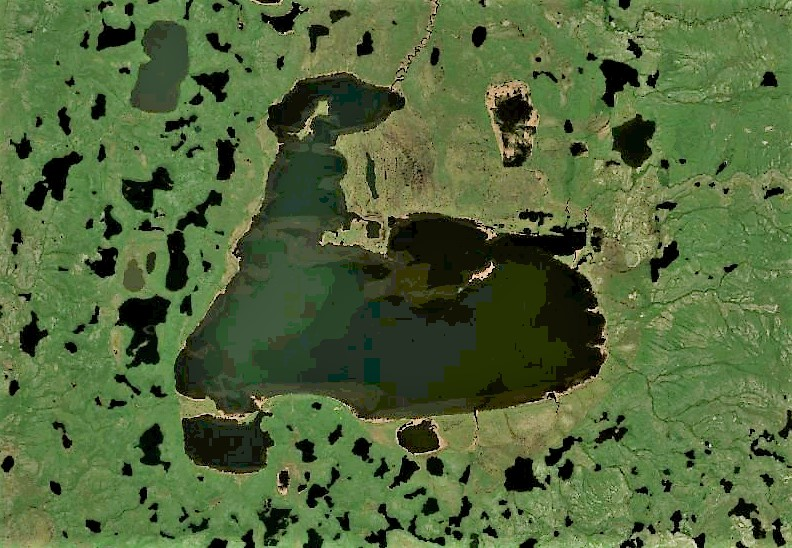
- Ulakhan-Kyuel Sentinel-2 image

- Location in the Sakha Republic, Russian Far East
- Location: Sakha Republic, Russia
- Coordinates: 67°47′20″N 124°14′07″E
- Primary outflows: Ulakhan-Kyuyol-Seene
- Catchment area: 265 square kilometres (102 mi^{2})
- Basin countries: Russia
- Max. length: 12.8 km (8.0 mi)
- Max. width: 11.5 km (7.1 mi)
- Surface area: 74 square kilometres (29 mi^{2})
- Frozen: September to June
- Islands: Yes
- References: Google Maps

Ulakhan-Kyuel, also spelled as Ulakhan-Kyuyel or Ulakhan-Kyuyol (Russian: Улахан кюэль, Улахан Кюель or Улахан-Кюёль; Yakut: Улахан Күөл, Ulaxan Küöl) is a lake in the Sakha Republic (Yakutia), Russia.

It is the largest lake in Zhigansky District. The Ulakhan-Kyuel has a 11,046 ha (27,300 acres) protected area of regional significance that was established in 1994. The lake is abundant in fish.

== Geography ==
Ulakhan-Kyuel lake is located near the eastern bank of the Lena, about 30 km (19 mi) in a straight line to the east of it. It is one of the largest lakes in the Central Yakut Plain. Flowing northwards from the lake at the northern end is river Ulakhan-Kyuyol-Seene (Улахан-Кюёль-Сээнэ), a tributary of river Seen-Yurekh, the largest tributary of the Natara.

Heading west, the Menkere, a tributary of the Lena, describes a wide, roughly semicircular, arch around the southern sector of the Ulakhan-Kyuel in its lower course. The area between the lake and the banks of the Menkere is over 7 km (4.3 mi) wide.

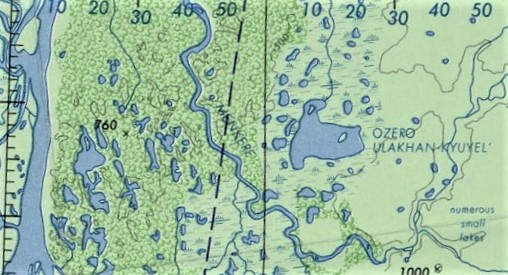
Ulakhan-Kyuel lake ONC map section.

== See also ==
- List of lakes of Russia
