= Zhigansky District =

Zhigansky District Жиганский улус (Russian)
- District

Other transcription(s)
  - Sakha: Эдьигээн улууhа
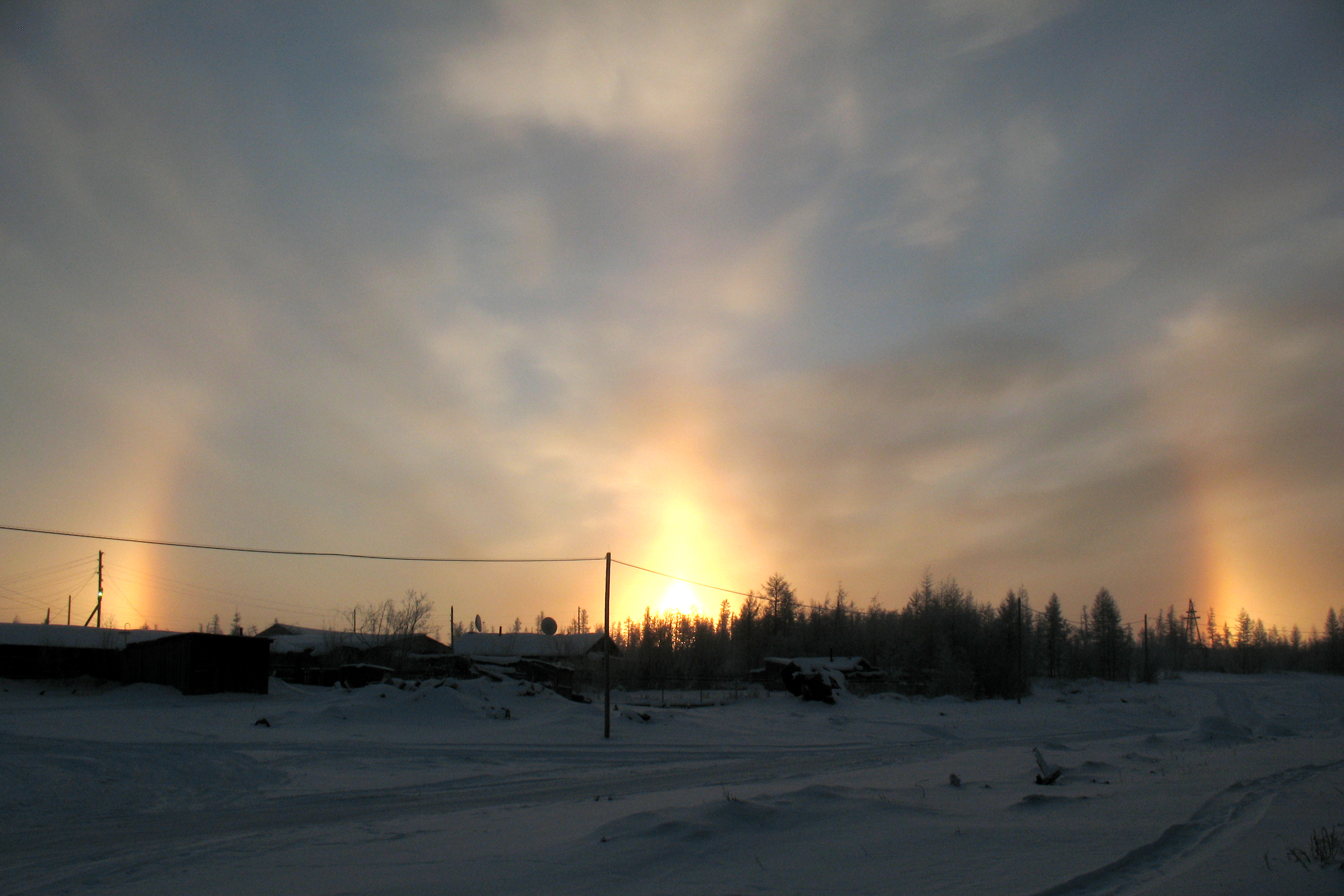
- Northern noon, Zhigansky District

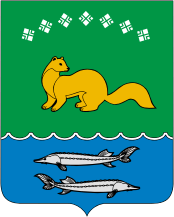
- Flag Coat of arms
- Location of Zhigansky District in the Sakha Republic
- Coordinates: 66°48′N 123°24′E
- Country: Russia
- Federal subject: Sakha Republic
- Established: December 10, 1930
- Administrative center: Zhigansk

Area
  - Total: 140,200 km^{2} (54,100 sq mi)

Population (2010 Census)
  - Total: 4,296
  - Density: 0.03064/km^{2} (0.07936/sq mi)
  - Urban: 0%
  - Rural: 100%

Administrative structure
  - Administrative divisions: 4 rural okrug
  - Inhabited localities: 5 rural localities

Municipal structure
  - Municipally incorporated as: Zhigansky Municipal District
  - Municipal divisions: 0 urban settlements, 4 rural settlements
- Time zone: UTC+
- OKTMO ID: 98622000
- Website: https://mr-zhiganskij.sakha.gov.ru/

Zhigansky District (Russian: Жига́нский улу́с; Yakut: Эдьигээн улууһа, romanized: Ecigeen uluuha) is an administrative and municipal district (raion, or ulus), one of the thirty-four in the Sakha Republic, Russia. It is located in the northern central part of the republic and borders with Bulunsky District in the north, Eveno-Bytantaysky National District in the east, Kobyaysky District in the southeast, Vilyuysky District in the southwest, and with Olenyoksky District in the northwest. The area of the district is 140,200 square kilometers (54,100 sq mi). Its administrative center is the rural locality (a selo) of Zhigansk. Population: 4,296 (2010 census); 4,312 (2002 Census); 5,678 (1989 Soviet census). The population of Zhigansk accounts for 79.6% of the district's total population.

== Geography ==
The main river in the district is the Lena. Some of its important tributaries, such as the Menkere, Muna, Khoruongka, Nuora (Strekalovka), Kyuelenke and Motorchuna, have their mouth in the area of the district. The largest lake is Lake Ulakhan-Kyuyol.

=== Climate ===
Average January temperature ranges from −36 °C (−33 °F) in the east to −40 °C (−40 °F) in the west and average July temperature ranges from +14 °C (57 °F) to +16 °C (61 °F). Annual precipitation ranges from 250–300 millimeters (9.8–11.8 in) in the west to 300–400 millimeters (12–16 in) in the east.

== History ==
The district was established on December 10, 1930.

== Demographics ==
As of the 2021 Census, the ethnic composition was as follows:

- Evenks: 63.0%
- Yakuts: 25.1%
- Russians: 9.1%
- other ethnicities: 2.8%

== Inhabited localities ==
Municipal composition
Rural settlements	Population	Male	Female	Rural localities in jurisdiction*
Bestyakhsky Nasleg (Бестяхский наслег)	218	111 (50.9%)	107 (49.1%)	**selo of Bestyakh**
Zhigansky Evenk National Nasleg (Жиганский эвенкийский национальный наслег)	3,421	1,631 (47.8%)	1,785 (52.2%)	**selo of Zhigansk** (administrative center of the district); **selo of Dzhardzhan**
Kystatyam (Кыстатыам)	397	202 (50.9%)	195 (49.1%)	**selo of Kystatyam**
Lindinsky Nasleg (Линдинский наслег)	260	131 (50.4%)	129 (49.6%)	**selo of Bakhanay**

Divisional source:
Population source:
*Administrative centers are shown in bold
Note: The figures given in the table above include 2010 census reports of one person (male) living in the intersettlement territory, clarified in the regional census data as inhabiting Dzardzhan.
