= Zhigansk =

Zhigansk Жиганск
- Selo

Other transcription(s)
  - Sakha: Эдьигээн
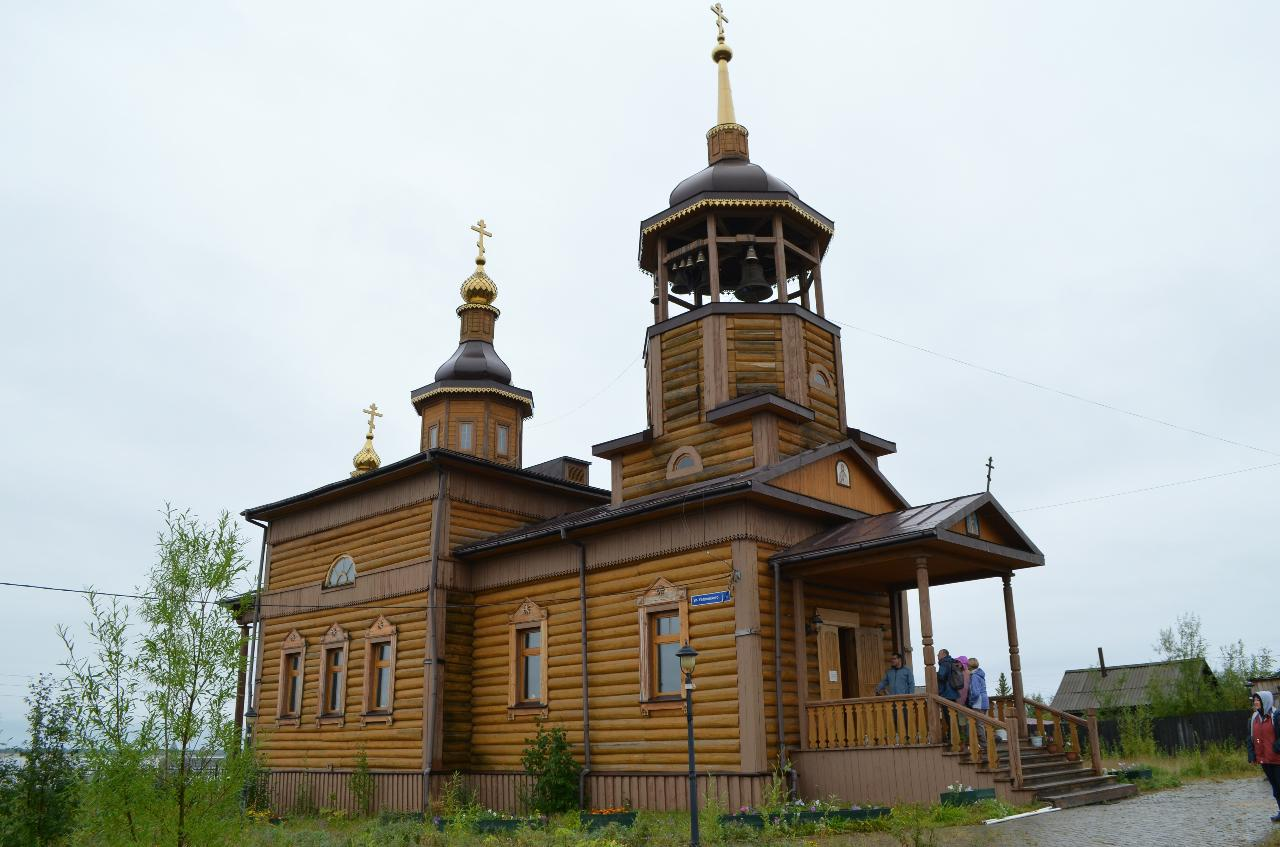
- Nikolskaya Church of Zhigansk

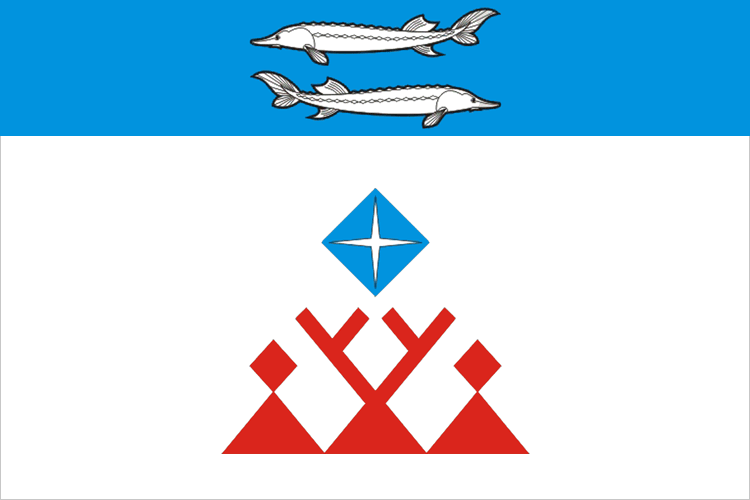
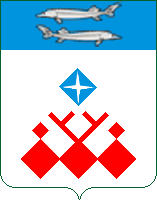
- Flag Coat of arms
- Interactive map of Zhigansk
- Location of Zhigansk Zhigansk (Sakha Republic)
- Coordinates: 66°46′N 123°23′E
- Country: Russia
- Federal subject: Sakha Republic
- Administrative district: Zhigansky District
- Rural okrugSelsoviet: Zhigansky Rural Okrug
- Founded: 1632
- Rural locality status since: 1783
- Elevation: 60 m (200 ft)

Population (2010 Census)
  - Total: 3,420
  - Estimate (2021): 3,382 (−1.1%)

Administrative status
  - Capital of: Zhigansky Rural Okrug

Municipal status
  - Municipal district: Zhigansky Municipal District
  - Rural settlement: Zhigansky Rural Settlement
  - Capital of: Zhigansky Rural Settlement
- Time zone: UTC+
- Postal codes: 678330, 678349
- OKTMO ID: 98622410101

Zhigansk (Russian: Жига́нск; Yakut: Эдьигээн, romanized: Ecigeen) is a rural locality (a selo) and the administrative center of Zhigansky District in the Sakha Republic, Russia, located on the left bank of the Lena River near where it is joined by its tributary the Nuora (Strekalovka), approximately 600 kilometers (370 mi) northwest of Yakutsk, the capital of the republic. Population: 3,420 (2010 census); 3,346 (2002 census); 4,511 (1989 Soviet census).

== History ==
It was founded in 1632 as an ostrog by Cossacks led by Pyotr Beketov. In 1783, Zhigansk was granted town status and made the seat of a newly created uyezd within Yakutsk Oblast. It lost this function in 1805 with the dissolution of the uyezd, but remained the most northerly town on the Lena until 1917, when it was demoted to rural status.

In 1930, Zhigansk became the administrative center of the newly created Zhigansky District, which was declared an "Evenk National District" due to its large population of Evenks. In 2002, Evenks represented around 47% of the local population and Yakuts a further 34%.

== Transportation ==
Zhigansk is served by the Zhigansk Airport.

There is no year-round road access to Zhigansk, but during the summer months, Yakutsk is reachable via boat on the Lena. In the months when the river is frozen, a winter road also leads to Yakutsk.

== Climate ==
Zhigansk is located in a border of continental subarctic climates Dfc, Dsc and Dfd, Dsd under the Köppen climate classification with extremely cold and long winters and short mild summers.

Despite having an extreme subarctic climate, the town is not quite as cold in winter as some towns with a similar climate, such as Verkhoyansk or Oymyakon, both of which are located further east in deep valleys where perpetual temperature inversions occur during the winter.

Climate data for Zhigansk
Month	Jan	Feb	Mar	Apr	May	Jun	Jul	Aug	Sep	Oct	Nov	Dec	Year
Record high °C (°F)	−8.2 (17.2)	−10.1 (13.8)	6.5 (43.7)	11.9 (53.4)	28.5 (83.3)	34.0 (93.2)	34.6 (94.3)	30.6 (87.1)	25.0 (77.0)	10.4 (50.7)	1.7 (35.1)	−10.4 (13.3)	34.6 (94.3)
Mean daily maximum °C (°F)	−33.7 (−28.7)	−29.9 (−21.8)	−16.6 (2.1)	−2.8 (27.0)	7.2 (45.0)	18.6 (65.5)	21.7 (71.1)	17.4 (63.3)	8.1 (46.6)	−6.6 (20.1)	−24.5 (−12.1)	−33.5 (−28.3)	−6.2 (20.8)
Daily mean °C (°F)	−36.7 (−34.1)	−33.6 (−28.5)	−22.0 (−7.6)	−8.4 (16.9)	2.6 (36.7)	13.3 (55.9)	16.5 (61.7)	12.5 (54.5)	4.0 (39.2)	−9.8 (14.4)	−27.8 (−18.0)	−36.3 (−33.3)	−10.5 (13.2)
Mean daily minimum °C (°F)	−40.1 (−40.2)	−37.5 (−35.5)	−27.2 (−17.0)	−14.2 (6.4)	−2.0 (28.4)	7.8 (46.0)	11.1 (52.0)	7.4 (45.3)	0.1 (32.2)	−13.0 (8.6)	−31.4 (−24.5)	−39.5 (−39.1)	−14.9 (5.2)
Record low °C (°F)	−59.6 (−75.3)	−58.1 (−72.6)	−51.9 (−61.4)	−44.4 (−47.9)	−22.6 (−8.7)	−4.5 (23.9)	−2.1 (28.2)	−5.4 (22.3)	−21.7 (−7.1)	−42.6 (−44.7)	−53.4 (−64.1)	−60.0 (−76.0)	−60.0 (−76.0)
Average precipitation mm (inches)	16 (0.6)	14 (0.6)	15 (0.6)	17 (0.7)	25 (1.0)	45 (1.8)	48 (1.9)	52 (2.0)	41 (1.6)	47 (1.9)	24 (0.9)	16 (0.6)	360 (14.2)
Average precipitation days (≥ 0.1 mm)	22.7	17.7	14.1	11.8	10.9	13.1	9.6	12.1	15.3	25.6	24.3	20.8	198
Average relative humidity (%)	76.1	76.0	72.7	63.0	57.9	61.3	67.2	76.1	78.0	85.0	80.5	76.0	72.5
Mean monthly sunshine hours	9.3	96.6	215.5	286.5	299.2	330.0	337.9	243.4	130.5	57.4	22.5	0.0	2,028.8
Source: climatebase.ru (1948–2011)
