= List of rivers of Russia =

Russia can be divided into a European and an Asian part. The dividing line is generally considered to be the Ural Mountains. The European part is drained into the Arctic Ocean, Baltic Sea, Black Sea, and Caspian Sea. The Asian part is drained into the Arctic Ocean and the Pacific Ocean.

Notable rivers of Russia in Europe are the Volga (which is the longest river in Europe), Pechora, Don, Kama, Oka and the Northern Dvina, while several other rivers originate in Russia but flow into other countries, such as the Dnieper (flowing through Russia, then Belarus and Ukraine and into the Black Sea) and the Western Dvina (flowing through Russia, then Belarus and Latvia into the Baltic Sea).

In Asia, important rivers are the Ob, the Irtysh, the Yenisei, the Angara, the Lena, the Amur, the Yana, the Indigirka, and the Kolyma.

In the list below, the rivers are grouped by the seas or oceans into which they flow. Rivers that flow into other rivers are ordered by the proximity of their point of confluence to the mouth of the main river, i.e., the lower in the list, the more upstream.

There is an alphabetical list of rivers at the end of this article.

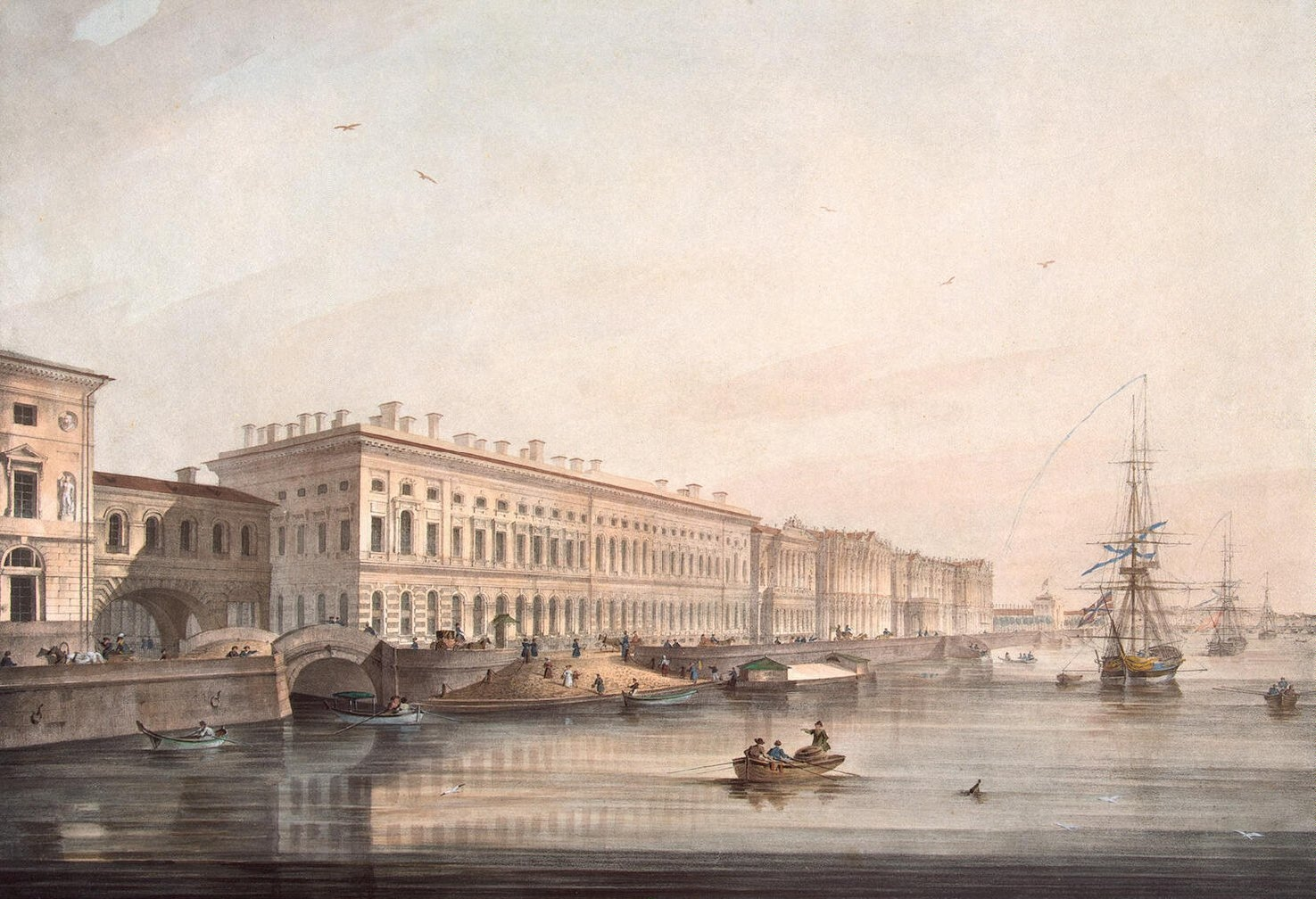
The Neva River in Saint Petersburg

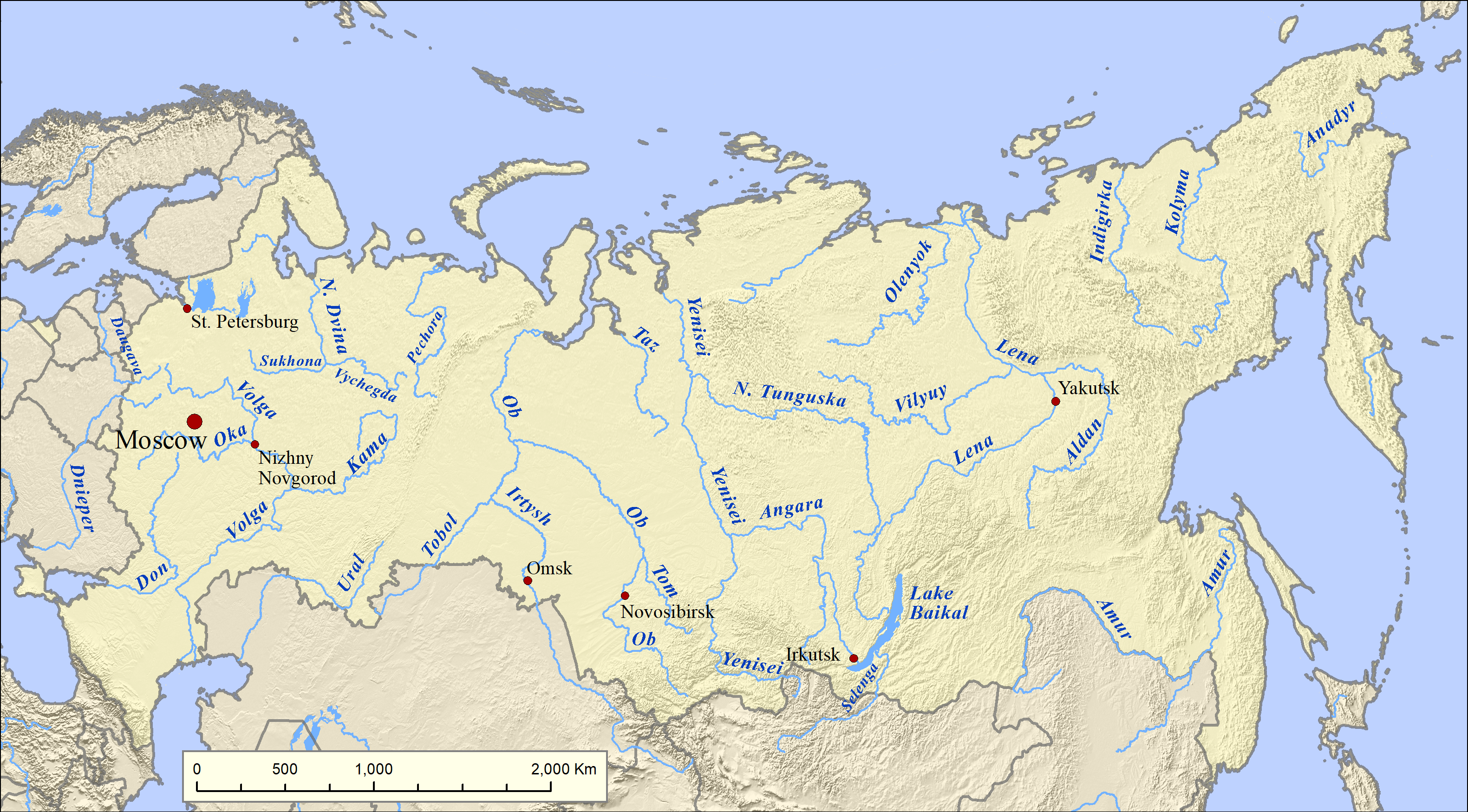
Major Rivers in Russia

== Barents Sea and White Sea (Arctic Ocean) ==
The rivers in this section are sorted east to west, and anticlockwise around the Kola Peninsula.

- Pechora (north-east of Naryan-Mar)
  - Usa (west of Usinsk)
    - Kolva (near Usinsk)
    - Bolshaya Synya
- Northern Dvina (in Severodvinsk)
  - Pinega (in Ust-Pinega)
  - Yomtsa (near Bolshaya Gora (ru))
  - Vaga (near Bereznik)
  - Uftyuga (near Krasnoborsk)
  - Vychegda (in Kotlas)
    - Vishera
  - Yug (in Veliki Ustyug)
  - Sukhona (in Veliki Ustyug)
    - Vologda (near Vologda)
- Mezen (near Mezen)
- Nautsiyoki
- Onega (in Onega)
- Kem (in Kem)
- Niva (in Kandalaksha)
- Varzuga (in Kuzomen)
- Malaya Belaya (on the Kola Peninsula in Murmansk Oblast)
- Ponoy (in Ponoy)
- Iokanga (in Iokanga)
- Voronya
- Tuloma
  - Kola
  - Rosta

== Baltic Sea ==
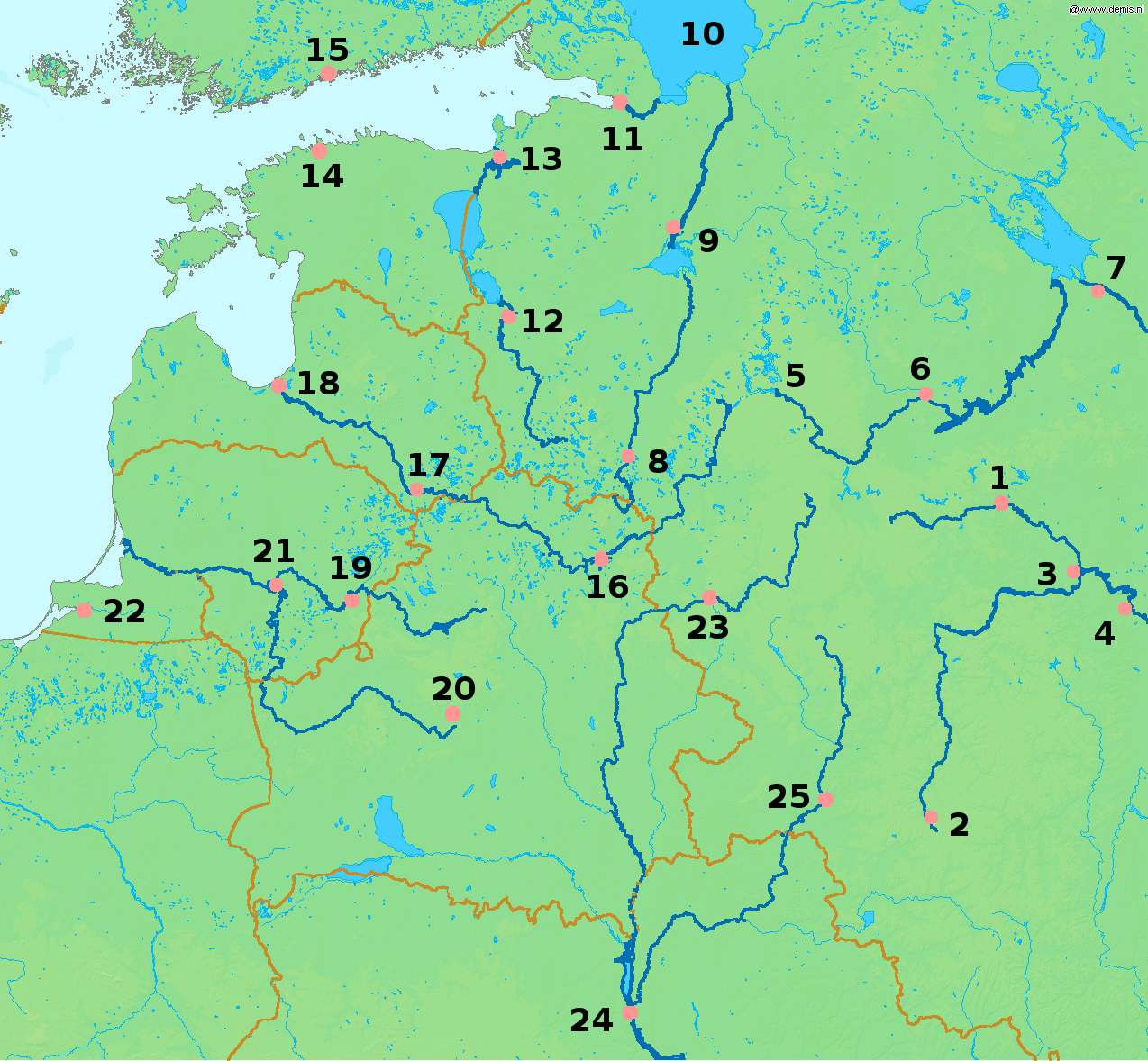
Rivers of western Russia

The rivers in this section are sorted southwest to northeast.

- Pregolya (near Kaliningrad)
  - Alle/Lava (in Znamensk)
  - Instruch/Inster (in Chernyakhovsk)
  - Angrapa (in Chernyakhovsk)
    - Pissa (near Chernyakhovsk)
    - Krasnaya River (in Gusev)
- Nemunas/Neman (near Šilutė, Lithuania)
  - Šešupė (near Neman)
- Daugava/Western Dvina (near Riga, Latvia)
  - Polota (in Polatsk, Belarus)
  - Kasplya (in Surazh, Belarus)
  - Mezha (near Velizh)
    - Obsha (near Bely)
- Narva (near Narva)
  - Plyussa (near Slantsy)
  - Lake Peipus (near Slantsy)
    - Velikaya (near Pskov)
      - Kukhva River (near Ostrov)
  - Rosson (between the Narva and Luga)
- Luga (in Ust-Luga)
  - Oredezh (near Luga)
- Neva (in Saint Petersburg)
  - Chernaya (into Kamenka River (Saint Petersburg))
  - Okhta (in Saint Petersburg)
    - Okkervil (in Saint Petersburg)
  - Izhora (in Ust-Izhora)
  - Tosna (in Otradnoye)
  - Mga (near Mga)
  - Lake Ladoga (in Shlisselburg)
    - Volkhov (near Volkhov)
      - Tigoda (near Kirishi)
        - Ravan
        - Chagoda
      - Vishera (near Velikiy Novgorod)
      - Lake Ilmen (in Velikiy Novgorod)
        - Msta (near Velikiy Novgorod)
          - Peretna (in Toporok)
          - Uver (near Berezovsky Ryadok)
          - Berezayka (in Berezovsky Ryadok)
            - Valdayka
          - Lake Mstino (near Vyshny Volochyok)
            - Tsna (near Vyshny Volochyok)
        - Pola (near Staraya Russa)
        - Lovat (near Staraya Russa)
          - Polist (near Staraya Russa)
          - Kunya (in Kholm)
        - Shelon (near Shimsk)
    - Syas (in Syasstroy)
    - Svir (near Lodeynoye Pole)
      - Pasha (near Lodeynoye Pole)
      - Oyat (near Lodeynoye Pole)
      - Lake Onega
        - Suna (in Kondopoga)
        - Vodla (near Pudozh)
        - Andoma (north of Vytegra)
        - Vytegra (near Vytegra)
    - Vuoksi (in Solovyovo and Priozersk)
      - Volchya (near Losevo)
- Sestra (near Sestroretsk)

== Black Sea ==
The rivers in this section are sorted west to east.

- Dnieper (near Kherson, Ukraine)
  - Desna (near Kyiv, Ukraine)
    - Seim (in Sosnytsia, Ukraine)
    - Sudost (north of Novhorod-Siversky, Ukraine)
  - Vyazma
- Mius (into Sea of Azov near Taganrog)
- Don (into Sea of Azov near Azov)
  - Temernik (near Rostov-on-Don)
  - Manych (in Manychskaya, east of Rostov-on-Don)
  - Sal (in Semikarakorsk)
  - Donets (near Semikarakorsk)
  - Khopyor (near Serafimovich)
  - Osered' (near Pavlovsk)
  - Bityug (near Pavlovsk)
  - Voronezh (near Voronezh)
- Yeya (into Sea of Azov near Yeysk)
- Kuban (into Sea of Azov near Temryuk)
  - Laba (in Ust-Labinsk)
- Mzymta (near Sochi)

== Caspian Sea ==
The rivers in this section are sorted west to east.

- Sulak (north of Makhachkala)
  - Andi Koysu (near Gimry)
  - Avar Koysu (near Gimry)
- Terek (near Kizlyar)
  - Malka (near Prokhladny)
- Kuma (north of Kizlyar)
  - Podkumok (near Georgiyevsk)
- Volga (near Astrakhan)
  - Yeruslan (near Kamyshin)
  - Tereshka (near Saratov)
  - Bolshoy Irgiz (near Volsk)
  - Maly Irgiz
  - Chapayevka (near Chapayevsk)
  - Samara (in Samara)
  - Sok (in Samara)
    - Kondurcha (north of Samara)
  - Bolshoy Cheremshan (near Dimitrovgrad)
  - Bezdna
  - Aktay
  - Kama (south of Kazan)
    - Vyatka (near Nizhnekamsk)
      - Cheptsa (near Kirov)
    - Belaya (near Neftekamsk)
      - Ufa (in Ufa)
        - Yuryuzan (near Karaidel)
    - Chusovaya (near Perm)
      - Sylva (near Perm)
    - Yegoshikha (in Perm)
    - Mulyanka (in Perm)
    - Vishera (near Solikamsk)
      - Kolva (near Cherdyn)
  - Kazanka (in Kazan)
  - Sviyaga (west of Kazan)
  - Ilet (near Volzhsk)
  - Anish (near Kozlovka)
  - Malaya Kokshaga (near Kokshaysk)
    - Maly Kundysh
  - Bolshaya Kokshaga (near Kokshaysk)
    - Bolshoy Kundysh
  - Tsivil (near Novocheboksarsk)
  - Rutka
  - Vetluga (near Kozmodemyansk)
  - Sura (in Vasilsursk)
    - Pyana
    - Alatyr (in Alatyr)
  - Kerzhenets (near Lyskovo)
  - Kudma (between Kstovo and Lyskovo)
  - Oka (in Nizhny Novgorod)
    - Klyazma (in Gorbatov)
      - Teza (near Yuzha)
      - Nerl (near Vladimir)
    - Moksha (near Yelatma)
      - Tsna (near Sasovo)
    - Pra (near Kasimov)
    - Moskva (in Kolomna)
      - Pakhra (near Moscow)
      - Neglinnaya (in Moscow)
      - Yauza (in Moscow)
      - Setun (in Moscow)
      - Istra (near Moscow)
      - Ruza (near Ruza)
    - Nara (in Serpukhov)
    - Protva (near Serpukhov)
      - Luzha (near Maloyaroslavets)
    - Ugra (near Kaluga)
    - Upa (near Suvorov)
      - Plava River (near Krapivna)
  - Uzola (near Balakhna)
  - Unzha (in Yuryevets)
    - Neya (near Makaryev)
    - Viga
  - Nyomda (near Yuryevets)
    - Shuya
  - Kostroma (in Kostroma)
    - Vyoksa (in Buy)
  - Kotorosl (in Yaroslavl)
  - Sogozha (near Poshekhonye)
  - Sheksna (in Cherepovets)
    - Lake Beloye (near Belozersk)
      - Kovzha
      - Kema
  - Suda (near Cherepovets)
    - Kolp
  - Mologa (near Vesyegonsk)
  - Kashinka (near Kalyazin)
  - Nerl (near Kalyazin)
    - Kubr
  - Medveditsa (near Kimry)
  - Dubna (in Dubna)
    - Sestra (near Dubna)
  - Shosha (near Konakovo)
    - Lama (near Kozlovo)
  - Tvertsa (in Tver)
    - Osuga (near Torzhok)
  - Vazuza (in Zubtsov)
  - Selizharovka (in Selizharovo)
- Ural (in Atyrau, Kazakhstan)
  - Ilek (in Ilek)
  - Sakmara (in Orenburg)

== Arctic Ocean, east of the Urals ==
The rivers in this section are sorted west to east.

- Ob (to Gulf of Ob)
  - Synya
  - Sob
  - Irtysh (near Khanty-Mansiysk)
    - Tobol (in Tobolsk)
      - Tavda (southwest of Tobolsk)
      - Tura (some 80 km downstream from Tyumen)
      - Iset (near Yalutorovsk)
        - Miass (east of Shadrinsk)
      - Ubagan
      - Uy (south of Kurgan)
    - Ishim (in Ust-Ishim)
    - Tara near (Tara)
    - Om (in Omsk)
  - Tromyogan
    - Agan
  - Vatinsky Yogan
  - Vakh (near Nizhnevartovsk)
    - Sabun
  - Tym (in Ust-Tym)
  - Kievsky Yogan
  - Vasyugan (in Kargasok)
  - Parabel (near Kargasok)
  - Ket (near Kolpashevo)
  - Chulym (in Ust-Chulym)
  - Tom (50 km downstream from Tomsk)
  - Aley (near Barnaul)
  - Kazym
  - Chaya
    - Iksa
  - Barnaulka
  - Kasmala
  - Katun River (in Biysk)
  - Biya River (in Biysk)
    - Chulyshman (into Lake Teletskoye)
      - Bashkaus
        - Chebdar
- Nadym (into Gulf of Ob in Khorovaya)
- Pur (into Taz Estuary in Ivay-Sale)
- Taz (into Taz Estuary in Tazovsky)
  - Tolka
  - Khudosey
- Yenisei
  - Tanama
  - Turukhan (near Turukhansk)
  - Abakan (in Abakan)
  - Kureika River
  - Yeloguy
  - Big Kheta
  - Sym
  - Lower Tunguska
    - Vivi River
  - Bakhta River
  - Stony Tunguska
    - Katanga
    - Tetere
  - Big Pit River
  - Kan River
  - Mana River
  - Bazaikha River
  - Kacha River
  - Kem River
  - Khemchik River
  - Khantayka
  - Angara River (in Strelka)
    - Oka (near Bratsk)
    - Bolshaya Belaya (near Usolye-Sibirskoye)
    - Irkut (in Irkutsk)
    - Selenga (into Lake Baikal near Kabansk)
      - Uda (in Ulan Ude)
      - Khilok River
      - Chikoy River
        - Menza River
      - Orkhon River (Mongolia)
        - Tuul River (Mongolia)
      - Dzhida River
      - Eg River (Mongolia)
    - Barguzin River (into Lake Baikal in Ust-Barguzin)
    - Turka River (into Lake Baikal)
    - Upper Angara River (into Lake Baikal near Severobaykalsk)
      - Churo
    - Taseyeva River
      - Chuna River
        - Kosovka River
      - Biryusa River
- Pyasina (east of Taz Estuary)
- Khatanga (near Kozhevnikovo)
  - Kotuy (near Khatanga)
    - Kotuykan
  - Kheta (near Khatanga)
- Anabar (at Khorgo)
  - Suolama
  - Udya (Udzha)
  - Malaya Kuonamka
  - Bolshaya Kuonamka
- Uele
- Olenyok (in Ust-Olenyok)
  - Arga-Sala
    - Kengeede
    - Kyuyonelekeen
    - Kukusunda
    - Kyuyonelikeen
  - Alakit
  - Siligir
  - Merchimden
  - Ukukit
  - Birekte
  - Kuoyka
  - Beyenchime
  - Kyuyutingde
  - Bur
  - Khorbusuonka
  - Kelimyar
  - Buolkalakh
- Lena (near Tiksi)
  - Vilyuy (near Sangar)
    - Tyung
    - Chybyda
      - Byrykan
    - Tonguo
    - Ulakhan-Botuobuya
    - Ochchuguy Botuobuya
    - Chona
      - Vakunayka
        - Killemtine
      - Dekimde
    - Chirkuo
    - Lakharchana
      - Khakhsyk
    - Akhtaranda
      - Alymdya
      - Olguydakh
    - Sen (river)
    - Ulakhan-Vava
    - Tyukyan
      - Chilli
    - Markha
    - Bappagay
    - Ygyatta
    - Kempendyay
  - Lungkha
    - Khatyng-Yuryakh
  - Tyugyuene
  - Sitte
  - Khanchaly
  - Kenkeme
  - Lyapiske
  - Tympylykan
  - Belyanka
    - Munni
  - Batamay
  - Aldan (in Batamay)
    - Amga (in Ust-Amginskoye)
    - Maya (in Ust-Maya)
      - Mati
      - Batomga
      - Maymakan
      - Severny Uy
      - Ingili
      - Yudoma
    - Amedichi
    - Tyry
    - Eastern Khandyga
    - Notora
    - Timpton
    - Yungyuele
    - Uchur
    - Allakh-Yun
    - Khanda
    - Tompo
      - Delinya
    - Tatta
    - Baray
    - Tukulan
    - Kele
    - Tumara
      - Nuora
  - Bolshoy Patom
  - Olyokma
    - Chara
      - Tokko
      - Apsat
      - Zhuya
    - Nyukzha
    - Tungir
  - Buotama
  - Menda
  - Tamma
  - Myla
  - Namana
    - Keyikte
  - Markha
    - Namyldzhylakh
  - Markhachan
  - Sinyaya
    - Matta
    - Chyna
  - Lyutenge
  - Tuolba
  - Linde
  - Suola
  - Kyuelenke
  - Muna
  - Motorchuna
  - Molodo
    - Syungyude
  - Cherendey (left)
  - Biryuk (left)
  - Nyuya (in Nyuya)
  - Derba
  - Ura
  - Peleduy
  - Vitim (in Vitim)
    - Kalar
    - Kalakan
    - Tsipa
      - Amalat
      - Tsipikan
    - Bambuyka
    - Muya
    - Kuanda
    - Kalakan
    - Mamakan
    - Karenga
    - Konda
    - Mama
  - Chaya
  - Ichera
  - Chechuy
  - Pilyuda
  - Chuya
  - Kirenga (in Kirensk)
  - Tayura
  - Kuta
  - Tutura
  - Ilga
  - Kyundyudey
  - Undyulyung (From the Verkhoyansk Range)
  - Nuora
  - Begidyan
  - Khoruongka
  - Sobolokh-Mayan
  - Menkere
  - Natara
  - Uel Siktyakh
  - Dzhardzhan
  - Byosyuke
  - Tikyan
  - Dyanyshka
  - Eyekit
- Yana (in Nizhneyansk)
  - Adycha
    - Derbeke
    - Nelgese
    - Tuostakh
    - Borulakh
    - Charky
  - Oldzho
    - Nenneli
  - Tykakh
  - Abyrabyt
  - Dulgalakh
  - Sartang
  - Bytantay
  - Baky
- Chondon
  - Nuchcha
  - Buor-Yuryakh
- Sellyakh
- Omoloy
  - Kuranakh-Yuryakh
  - Arga-Yuryakh
  - Ulakhan-Kyuegyulyur
- Kyuyol-Yuryakh
- Khroma
  - Yuryung-Ulakh
- Sundrun
  - Maly Khomus-Yuryakh
- Bogdashkina
- Volchya
- Gusinaya
- Indigirka (near Tabor, Sakha)
  - Khastakh
  - Shandrin
  - Kuydusun
  - Kyuyente
    - Bryungade
    - Suntar
    - Agayakan
  - Elgi
  - Nera
  - Moma
  - Chibagalakh
  - Badyarikha
  - Selennyakh
  - Shangina
  - Bolshaya Ercha
  - Druzhina
  - Uyandina
    - Khatyngnakh
    - Khachimcher
    - Buor-Yuryakh
  - Allaikha
  - Byoryolyokh
- Alazeya
  - Buor-Yuryakh
  - Rossokha
    - Arga-Yuryakh
- Kolyma (near Ambarchik)
  - Anyuy (near Nizhnekolymsk)
    - Bolshoy Anyuy River
    - Maly Anyuy River
  - Omolon (±80 km upstream from Nizhnekolymsk)
    - Ango
    - Oloy
    - Kedon
    - Namyndykan
  - Popovka
  - Yasachnaya
    - Omulyovka
  - Zyryanka
  - Ozhogina
  - Sededema
  - Buyunda
  - Seymchan
  - Balygychan
  - Sugoy
  - Debin
  - Bakhapcha
    - Maltan
  - Taskan
  - Korkodon
    - Bulun
  - Beryozovka
  - Tenka
  - Ayan-Yuryakh
  - Kulu
- Chaun River
- Palyavaam River
- Pegtymel River (flowing into Chukchi Sea)
- Amguema River
- Ioniveyem River
- Chegitun River

== Pacific Ocean/Sea of Okhotsk ==
The rivers in this section are sorted northeast to southwest, and anticlockwise around the Kamchatka Peninsula.

- Anadyr (in the Bering Sea)
  - Tanyurer
  - Belaya (Chukotka)
  - Yablon
  - Yeropol
  - Mayn
- Velikaya
- Khatyrka
  - Iomrautvaam
- Ukelayat
- Kamchatka (in Ust-Kamchatsk)
- Avacha (near Petropavlovsk-Kamchatsky)
- Bolshaya (west coast of Kamchatka Peninsula)
- Kikhchik (west coast of Kamchatka Peninsula)
- Penzhina
  - Belaya (Penzhina)
  - Oklan
- Gizhiga
- Paren
- Yama
- Yana
- Ola
- Arman
  - Khasyn
- Taui
  - Chyolomdzha
- Ulbeya
- Inya
- Kukhtuy
- Okhota
- Urak
- Uda (in Chumikan)
  - Maya
- Amur (in Nikolayevsk-on-Amur)
  - Anyuy (in Naykhin)
  - Ussuri (in Khabarovsk)
    - Bikin River (near Bikin)
      - Kontrovod (near Luchegorsk)
  - Gur
  - Gorin
  - Bureya (near Raychikhinsk)
  - Zeya (in Blagoveshchensk)
    - Tom (±80 km upstream from Blagoveshchensk)
    - Selemdzha (±50 km upstream from Svobodny)
      - Nora
      - Ulma
      - Orlovka
      - Byssa
    - Dep
  - Shilka
    - Nercha (near Nerchinsk)
    - Ingoda (near Shilka)
    - Onon (near Shilka)
  - Amgun
    - Nimelen
  - Argun
  - Amazar
- Tumen (in Sŏsura-ri, North Korea)

== Endorheic Siberian rivers ==
- Bagan (river)
  - Baganyonok
- Burla (river)
- Chulym (Malye Chany basin)
- Karasuk (river)
- Kargat (river)
- Kuchuk (river)
- Kulunda (river)

== Unsorted ==
- Kosovoy

== Alphabetical list ==
=== A–G ===
Abakan, Alazeya, Aldan, Aley, Ambarnaya, Amga, Amur, Anabar, Anadyr, Angara River, Angrapa, Anyuy (Kolyma), Anyuy (Amur), Argun, Avacha, Barguzin, Bashkaus, Belaya, Berezayka, Bikin, Bityug, Biya, Bolshaya Belaya, Bolshaya Pyora (Amur Oblast), Bolshaya Pyora (Komi Republic), Buotama, Bureya, Chagoda, Chebdar, Cheptsa, Chernaya, Chulym (Ob), Chulyshman, Chusovaya, Cupid, Daugava/Western Dvina, Dep, Desna, Dnieper, Don, (Seversky) Donets, Dubna, El'duga

=== I–L ===
Ik, Ilek, Indigirka, Ingoda, Instruch, Iokanga, Irkut, Irtysh, Iset, Ishim, Istra, Izhora, Kama, Kamo River (Russia), Kamchatka, Kashinka, Kasplya, Katanga, Katun, Kazanka, Kerzhenets, Ket, Khatanga, Kheta, Khopyor, Kirenga, Klyazma, Kolva (Usa), Kolva (Vishera), Kolyma, Kondurcha, Kosovka, Kosovoy, Kostroma, Kotorosl, Kotuy, Kozhim, Krasnaya River, Kuban, Kubr, Kuma, Kunya, Laba, Lama, Lava/Łyna, Lena, Lovat, Lower Tunguska, Luga, Lyutenge

=== M–S ===
Malka, Malaya Belaya, Manych, Markha, Markha (Vilyuy), Matta, Maya, Mezen, Mga, Miass, Mius, Moksha, Mologa, Moskva, Msta, Mulyanka, Muna, Nadym, Nara, Narva, Nautsiyoki River, Neglinnaya, Nemunas/Neman, Nercha, Nerl (Klyazma), Nerl (Volga), Neva, Niva, Northern Dvina, Nosa, Nyuya, Ob, Oka (Volga), Oka (Angara River), Olenyok, Olyokma, Om, Omolon, Onega, Onon, Oredezh, Osuga, Oyat, Pakhra, Pasha, Parabel, Pechora, Pinega, Pissa, Plava, Podkamennaya Tunguska, Podkumok, Pola, Polist, Polota, Ponoy, Pra, Pregolya, Protva, Pur, Pyasina, Ravan, Ruza, Sakmara, Sal, Samara, Seim, Selemdzha, Selenga, Sestra River (Leningrad Oblast), Sestra River (Dubna), Šešupė, Setun, Sheksna, Shelon, Shilka, Shosha, Sudost, Sukhona, Suola, Sura, Svir, Sviyaga, Syas, Sylva

=== T–Z ===
Tavda, Tara, Taz, Terek, Tetere, Teza, Tigoda, Tobol, Tom (Ob), Tom (Zeya), Tosna, Tsna River (Moksha basin), Tsna River (Tver Oblast), Tugur, Tumen, Tura, Turukhan, Tvertsa, Tym, Tyung, Uda (Buryatia), Uda (Khabarovsk Krai), Ufa, Uftyuga, Ugra, Unzha, Upa, Upper Angara River, Ural, Usa, Ussuri, Uver, Uzola, Vaga, Vakh, Valdayka, Varzuga, Vasyugan, Velikaya, Vetluga, Vilyuy, Vishera (Volkhov), Vishera (Vychegda), Vishera (Kama), Vitim, Volchya (Vuoksi), Volga, Volkhov, Vologda, Voronezh, Voronya, Vuoksi, Vyatka, Vyazma, Vychegda, Vytegra, Yana, Yauza, Yegoshikha, Yomtsa, Yenisei, Yug, Yuryuzan, Zeya, Zhupanova
