= Baday =

Baday may refer to:

- Ahmed Baday (b. 1979), Moroccan runner
- Baday, Afghanistan, a place in Afghanistan
- Baday, Russia, a village in Irkutsk Oblast, Russia
- Lisa Baday (b. 1957), Canadian fashion designer
