= Gilyuy =

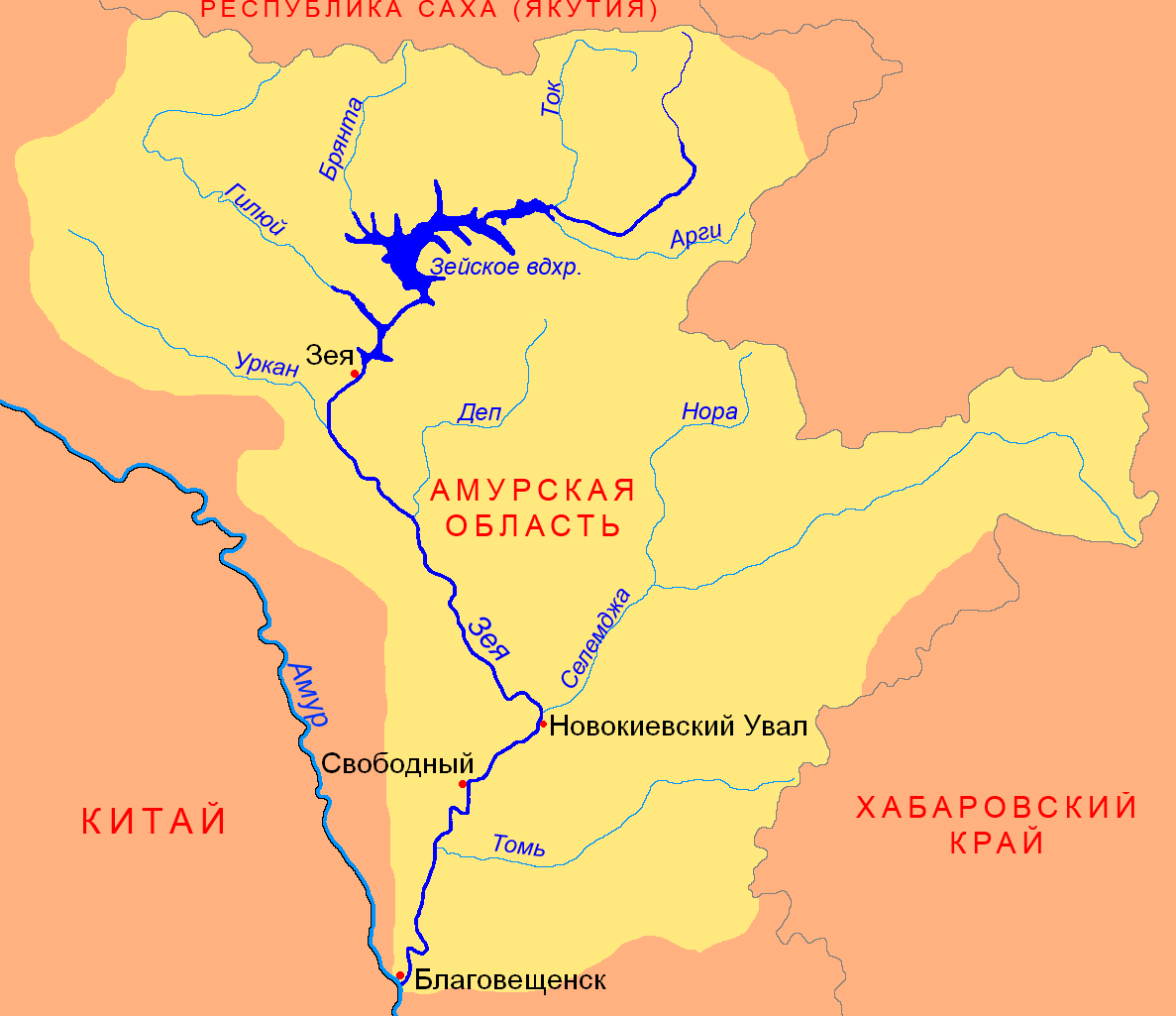
- Zeya basin

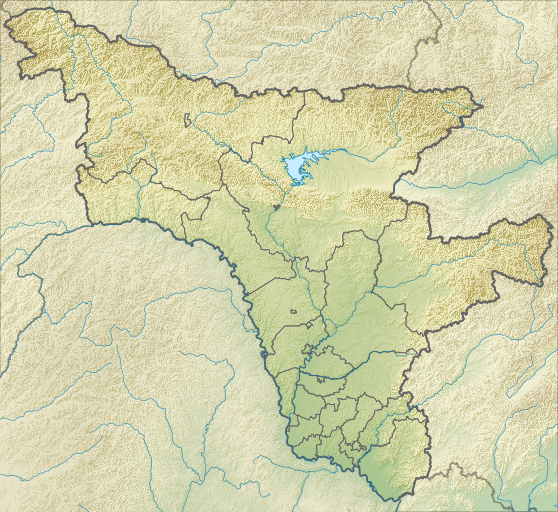
- Mouth location in Amur Oblast, Russia

Location
- Country: Russia

Physical characteristics
- Mouth: Zeya
  - coordinates: 53.9803°N 127.4600°E
- Length: 545 km (339 mi)
- Basin size: 22,500 km^{2} (8,700 sq mi)

Basin features
- Progression: Zeya→ Amur→ Sea of Okhotsk

The Gilyuy (Russian: Гилю́й) is a river in Amur Oblast, Russia. It is a right tributary of the Zeya, and is 545 km long, with a drainage basin of 22,500 km^{2}. The river has its sources on the southern slopes of the Stanovoy Mountains, passes near Tynda and flows southeast into the Zeya Reservoir.

Its main tributaries are the Mogot and the Tynda.

== See also ==
- List of rivers of Russia
