= Urik =

Urik may refer to:

- Urik (river), a river in Irkutsk Oblast, Russia
- Urik (rural locality), a rural locality (a selo) in Irkutsk Oblast, Russia
- Urik, the Hungarian name for Uric village, Pui Commune, Hunedoara County, Romania
