= Shuya River =

Shuya River may refer to:

- Shuya River, Kostroma Oblast, Russia
- Shuya River, Karelia, Russia
