= Kamo River (Russia) =

Russian river

Coordinates: 60°43′54″N 97°31′06″E

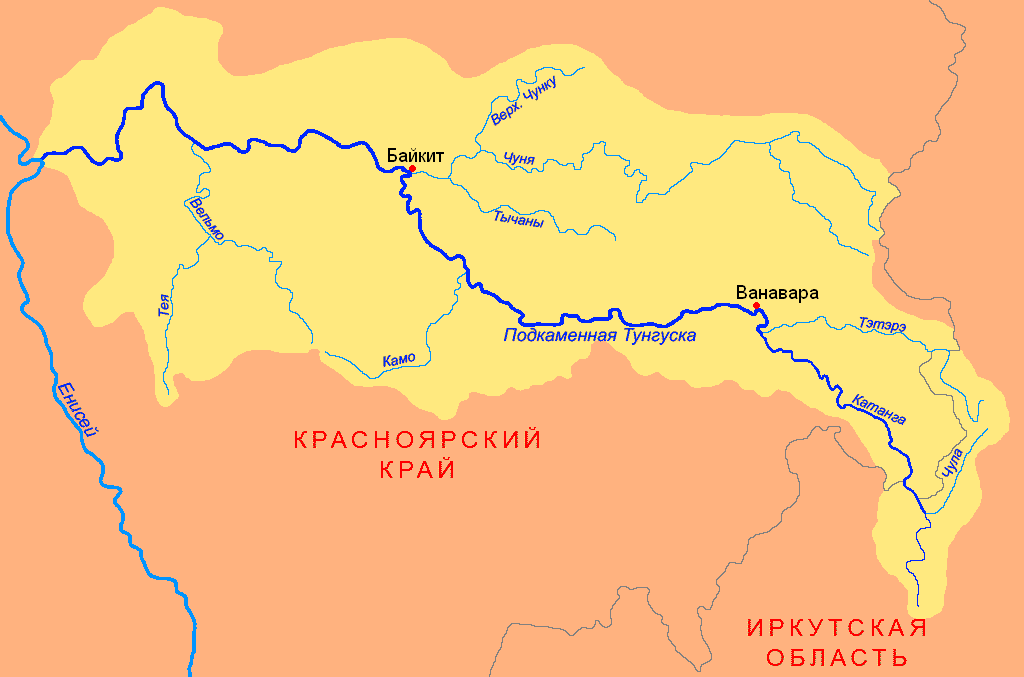
Map of the Podkamennaya Tunguska basin

The Kamo (Russian: Камо) is a river in Krasnoyarsk Krai, Russia. It is a left tributary of the Podkamennaya Tunguska. The river is 339 kilometres long and its basin drains a surface of 14,500 km^{2}.

== See also ==
- List of rivers of Russia
