= Zeya (river) =

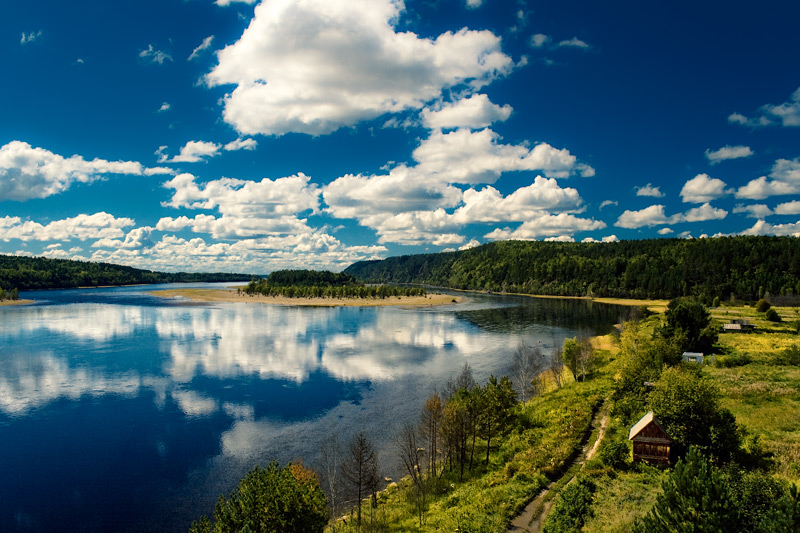
- Island on the Zeya.

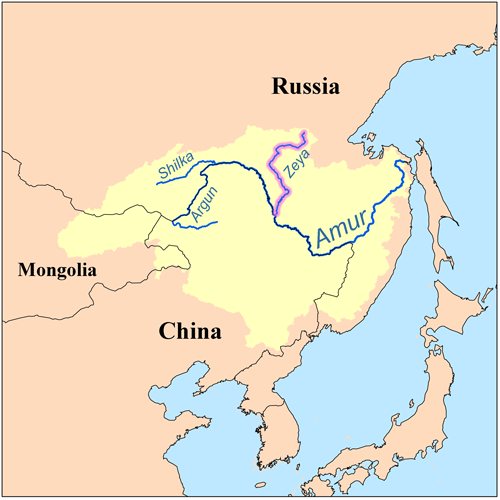
- Map of the Amur drainage basin with the Zeya highlighted
- Native name: Зея (Russian)

Location
- Country: Russia
- Federal subject: Amur Oblast

Physical characteristics
- Source: Toko-Stanovik
- Mouth: Amur
  - coordinates: 50.2419°N 127.598°E
- Length: 1,242 km (772 mi)
- Basin size: 233,000 km^{2} (90,000 mi^{2})
- Discharge
  - location: Blagoveshchensk
  - average: 1,810 m^{3}/s (64,000 cu ft/s)
  - minimum: 1.5 m^{3}/s (53 cu ft/s)
  - maximum: 14,200 m^{3}/s (500,000 cu ft/s)

Basin features
- Progression: Amur→ Sea of Okhotsk

The Zeya (Russian: Зе́я; from indigenous Evenki word "djee" (blade); Chinese: 结雅; Manchu: ᠵᡳᠩᡴᡳᡵᡳ
ᠪᡳᡵᠠ, Mölendroff: jingkiri bira) is a northern, left tributary of the Amur in Amur Oblast, Russia. It is 1,242 km (772 mi) long, and has a drainage basin of 233,000 km^{2} (90,000 sq mi). The average flow of the river is 1,810 m^{3}/s (64,000 cu ft/s).

== History ==
The first Russian documented to enter the area was Vassili Poyarkov.

== Course ==
It rises in the Toko-Stanovik mountain ridge, a part of the Stanovoy Range.

The Zeya flows through the Zeya Reservoir, at the junction of the Tukuringra Range and Dzhagdy Range, and joins the Amur near Blagoveshchensk, at the border with China. Regulation of river discharge by Zeya Dam mitigates extremities of river flow down to 5000 m^{3}/s. The Zeya contributes around 16% of both the average and maximum flow of the Amur because of the flow regulations. In the past, the Zeya could have contributed up to almost 50% of the Amur's maximum flow of approximately 30,000 m^{3}/s.

The main tributaries of the Zeya are Tok, Mulmuga, Bryanta, Gilyuy, and Urkan on the right, and Kupuri, Argi, Dep, Selemdzha, and Tom on the left.

The river freezes from November to May. When it is unfrozen, the river is navigable with the most important river ports being Zeya, Svobodny, and Blagoveshchensk.

== See also ==
- List of rivers of Russia
