= Baday, Russia =

Human settlement in Usolsky District, Russia

Coordinates: 52.875542°N 103.6091°E

Baday (Russian: Бадай) is a village in Usolsky District of Irkutsk Oblast, Russia. It is situated on the Bolshaya Belaya River.

== History ==
The village is first mentioned in documents dated to 1682, when it was listed as the property of the Ascension Monastery in Irkutsk. By 1774, the village had 85 households and a total of 644 residents. The population had increased to 1,030 people by 1897. Much of this growth occurred due to the fact that Baday was a popular dumping ground for various exiles from other parts of the Russian Empire. As of 2010, the village's population was only 270.
