= Yudychvumchorr =

Mountain in Murmansk Oblast, Russia

- Юдычвумчорр
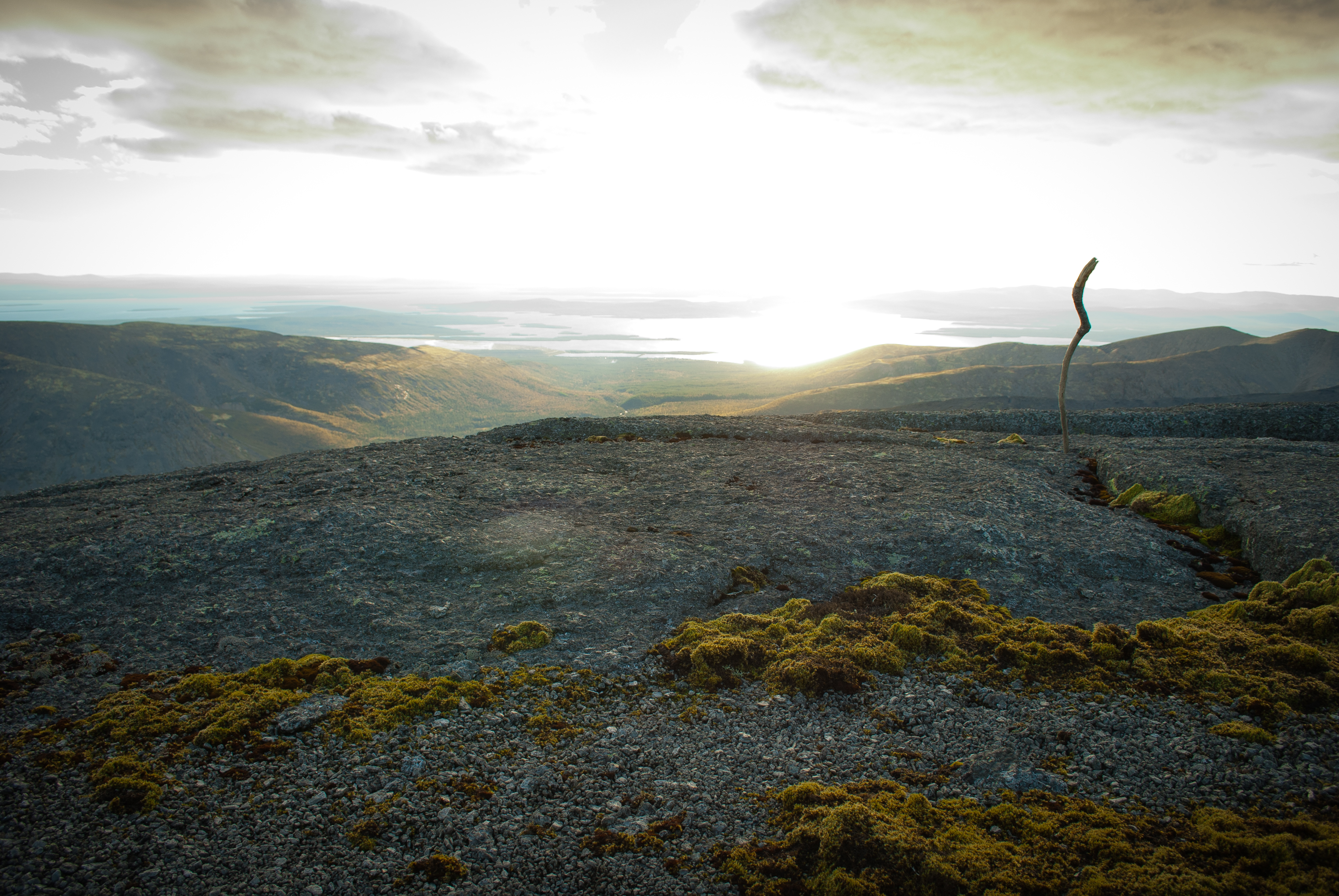
- Yudychvumchorr near sunset

Highest point
- Elevation: 1,201 m (3,940 ft)
- Prominence: 1,051 m (3,448 ft)
- Coordinates: 67°43′21″N 33°28′06″E

Geography
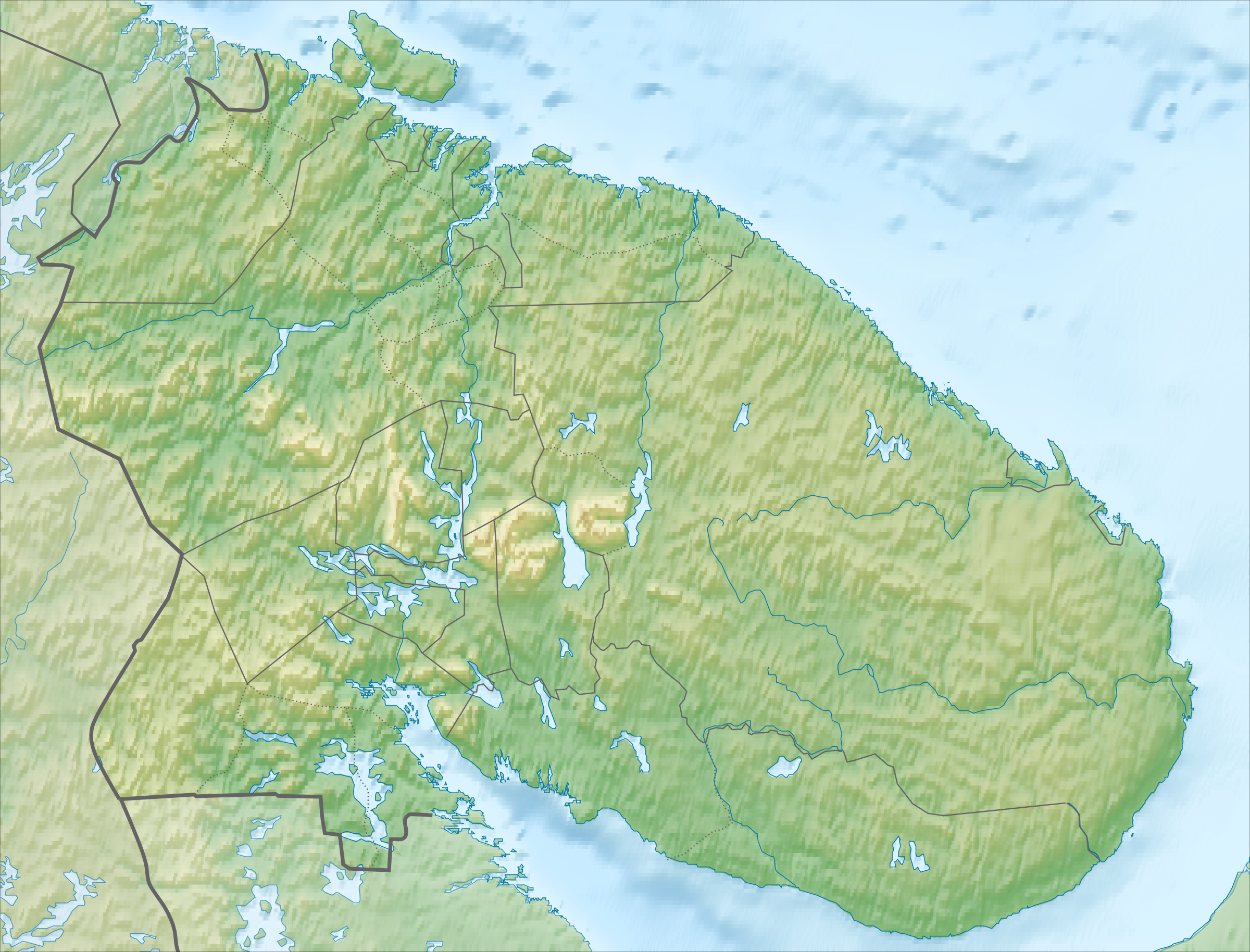
- Location within Murmansk Oblast
- Location: Murmansk Oblast, Russia
- Parent range: Khibiny Mountains

Climbing
- Easiest route: From Apatity or Kirovsk

Yudychvumchorr (Russian: Юдычвумчорр) is a peak in Murmansk Oblast, Russia. It is the highest point of the oblast and of the Kola Peninsula. The peak is also the highest point of the European side of the Russian Arctic, not counting Arctic islands.

The name of the mountain originated in the Kildin Sami language.

== Description ==
Yudychvumchorr is a 1,201 metres (3,940 ft) high mountain located north of the Arctic Circle in the Khibiny Mountains. The mountain rises in the southwestern sector of the Kola Peninsula. The Malaya Belaya river flows within a deep valley at the foot of the mountain in the south and southeast. Formerly the 1,189 metres (3,901 ft) high Chasnachorr had been considered the highest point of the Khibiny.

== See also ==
- List of highest points of Russian federal subjects
- List of mountains and hills of Russia
