= Tara (Irtysh) =

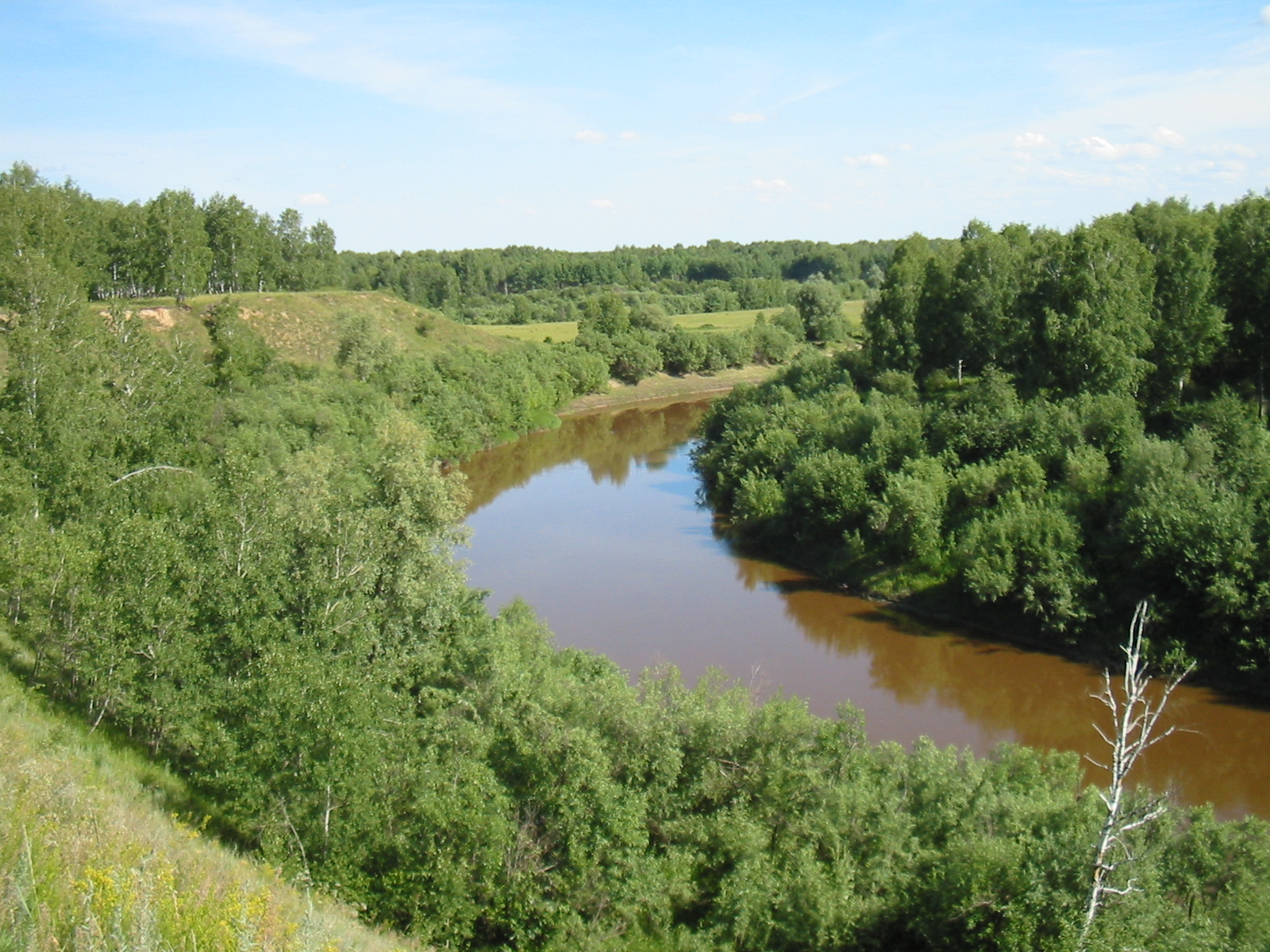

Location
- Country: Russia
- Region: Novosibirsk Oblast; Omsk Oblast

Physical characteristics
- Mouth: Irtysh
  - coordinates: 56.6916°N 74.6073°E
- Length: 806 km (501 mi)
- Basin size: 18,300 km^{2} (7,100 sq mi)

Basin features
- Progression: Irtysh→ Ob→ Kara Sea

The Tara (Russian: Тара) is a river in the Novosibirsk and the Omsk Oblasts in Russia. It is a right tributary of the Irtysh in the Ob's basin. The length of the river is 806 kilometres (501 miles). The area of its basin is 18,300 square kilometres (7,100 square miles). The Tara freezes up in late October or November and is frozen until late April or early May.

== See also ==
- List of rivers in Russia
