= Dep (river) =

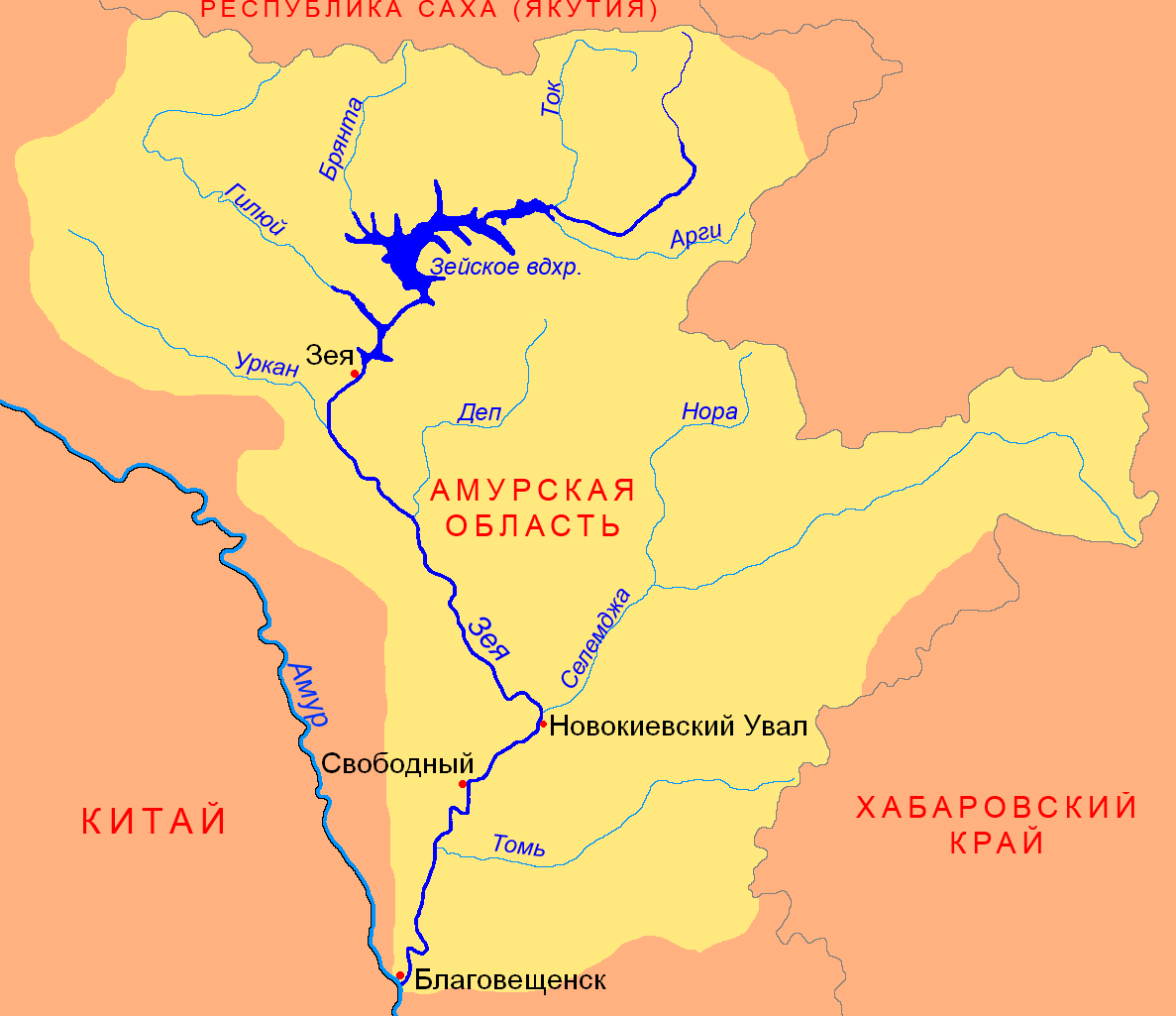
- Zeya basin

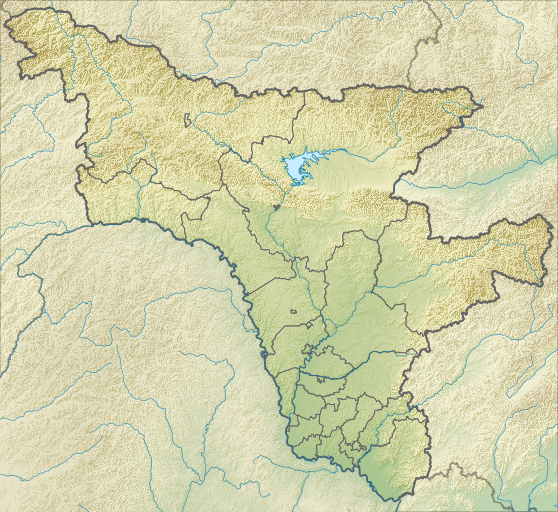
- Mouth location in Amur Oblast, Russia

Location
- Country: Russia

Physical characteristics
- Mouth: Zeya
  - coordinates: 52.8711°N 127.7464°E
- Length: 348 km (216 mi)
- Basin size: 10,400 km^{2} (4,000 sq mi)

Basin features
- Progression: Zeya→ Amur→ Sea of Okhotsk

The Dep (Russian: Деп) is a left tributary of the Zeya (itself a tributary of the Amur) in Amur Oblast, eastern Russia. It is 348 kilometres (216 mi) long, and has a drainage basin of 10,400 square kilometres (4,000 sq mi).

== See also ==
- List of rivers of Russia
