= Dubna (disambiguation) =

Dubna is a town in Moscow Oblast, Russia.

Dubna may also refer to:

== Inhabited localities ==
- Dubna, Latvia, a village in Dubna parish, Daugavpils municipality, Latvia
- Dubna, Russia, name of several inhabited localities in Russia
- Dubna, Soroca, a commune in Soroca District, Moldova

== Rivers ==
- Dubna (Volga), a river in central Russia, a tributary of the Volga
- Dubna (Upa), a river in Tula Oblast, Russia, a tributary of the Upa
- Dubna (Daugava), a river in Latvia, a tributary of the Daugava

== Other uses ==
- Dubna, informal name of Joint Institute for Nuclear Research, a large international research institute situated in the town of Dubna, Russia
- Dubna 48K, a clone of ZX spectrum computer

== See also ==
- Dubno
