= Bolshaya Kheta =

Bolshaya Kheta Большая Хета
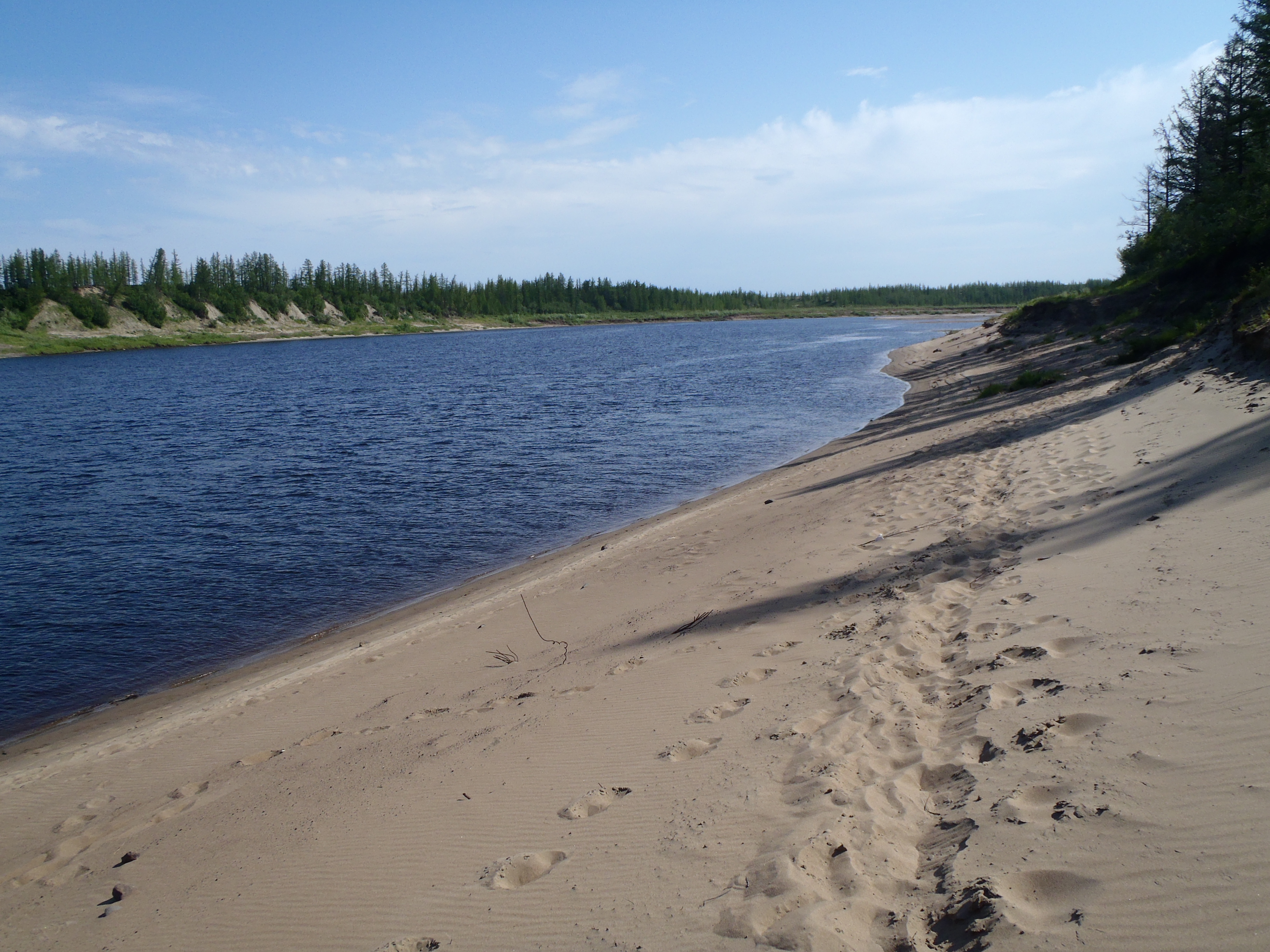

- Location within Krasnoyarsk Krai

Physical characteristics
- Source: Lake Yelovoy
  - coordinates: 67°59′44″N 84°33′42″E
  - elevation: 150 m (490 ft)
- Mouth: Yenisey
  - coordinates: 69°33′0″N 84°16′43″E
  - elevation: 1 m (3 ft 3 in)
- Length: 646 km (401 mi)
- Basin size: 20,700 km^{2} (8,000 sq mi)

Basin features
- Progression: Yenisey→ Kara Sea

The Bolshaya Kheta (Russian: Большая Хета, "Great Kheta") is a river in Krasnoyarsk Krai, Russia. It is a left tributary of the Yenisey.

== Course ==
The source of the Bolshaya Kheta is in Lake Yelovoy. It flows roughly northeastwards and joins the Yenisey northwest of Dudinka. The Bolshaya Kheta is 646 kilometres (401 mi) long, and the area of its basin is 20,700 square kilometres (8,000 mi^{2}).

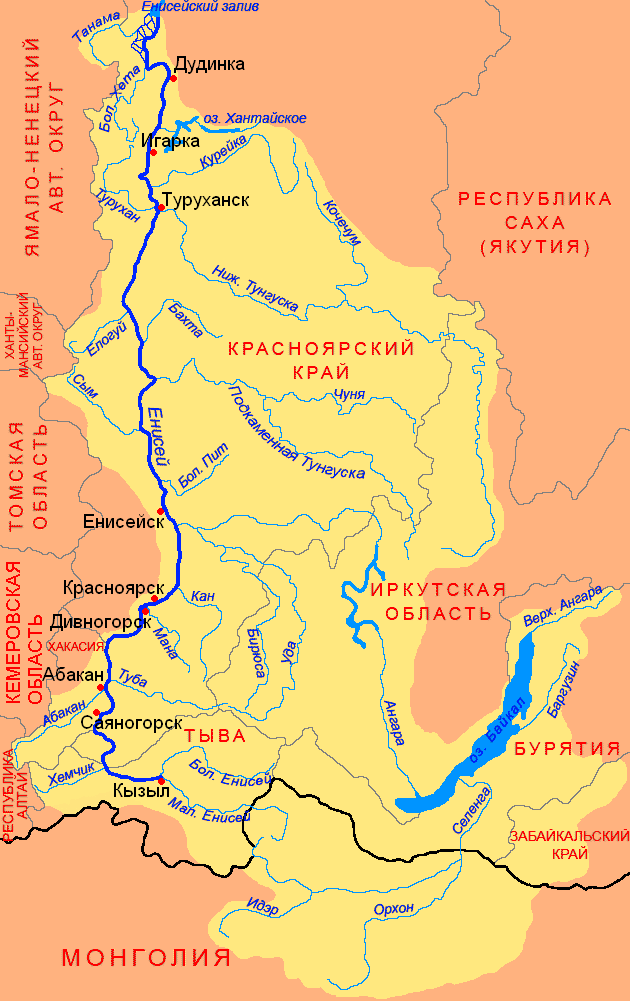
Basin of the Yenisey

== See also ==
- List of rivers of Russia
