= Malaya Belaya =

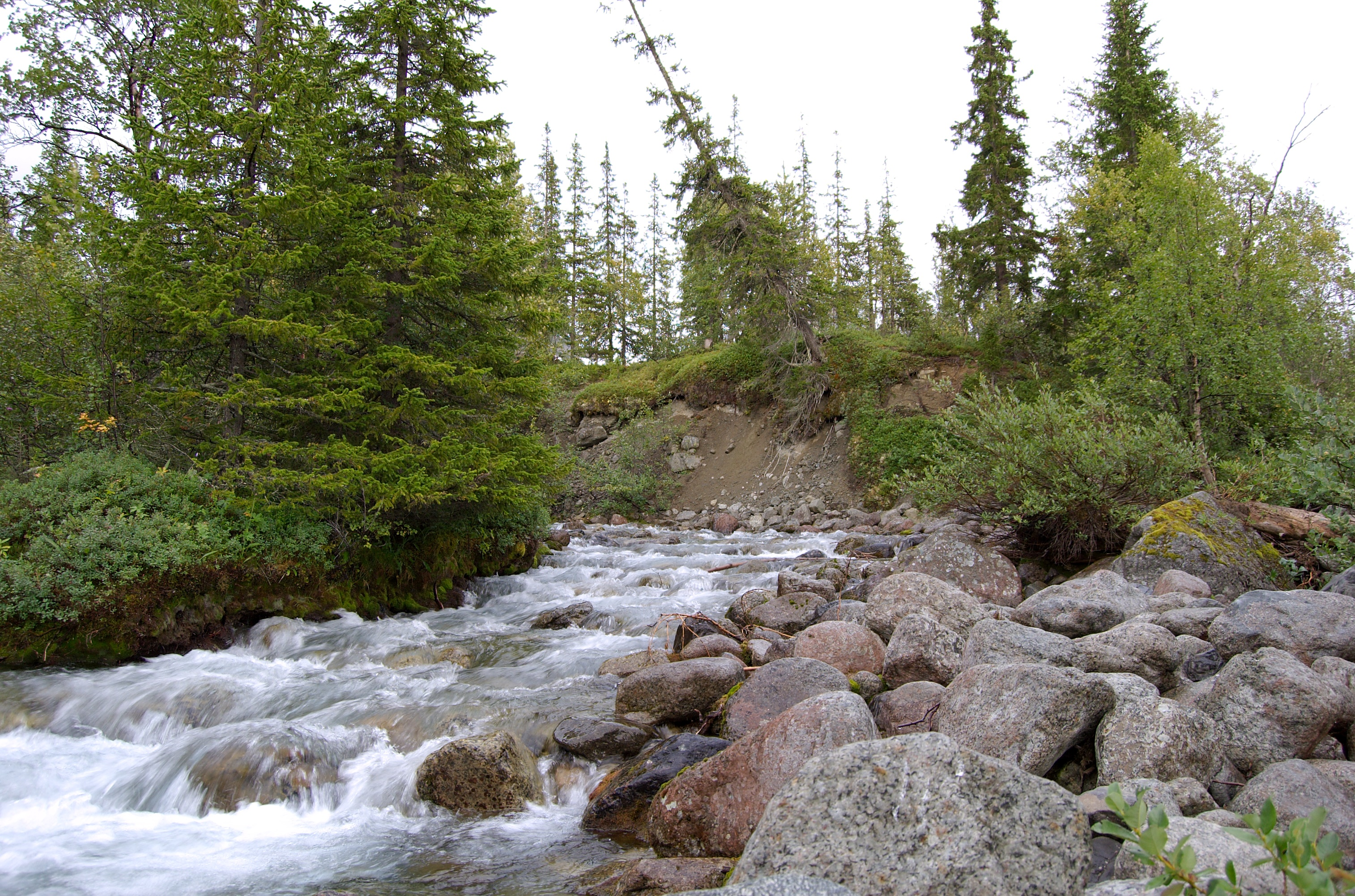
- Native name: Малая Белая (Russian)

Location
- Country: Russia
- Region: Murmansk Oblast

Physical characteristics
- Source
  - location: Mount Khibiny
- Mouth
  - location: Lake Imandra
  - coordinates: 67°40′48″N 33°12′29″E
- Length: 13 km (8.1 mi)

Basin features
- Progression: Lake Imandra→ Niva→ White Sea

The Malaya Belaya (Russian: Малая Белая) is a small river on the Kola Peninsula in Murmansk Oblast, Russia.

== Geography ==
The river originates in the Khibiny Mountains and flows within a deep valley at the foot of the Yudychvumchorr. Its mouth is in Lake Imandra. The Malaya Belaya is 13 kilometres (8.1 mi) long, and has a drainage basin of 83 square kilometres (32 sq mi).
