= Nautsiyoki =

River in Russia

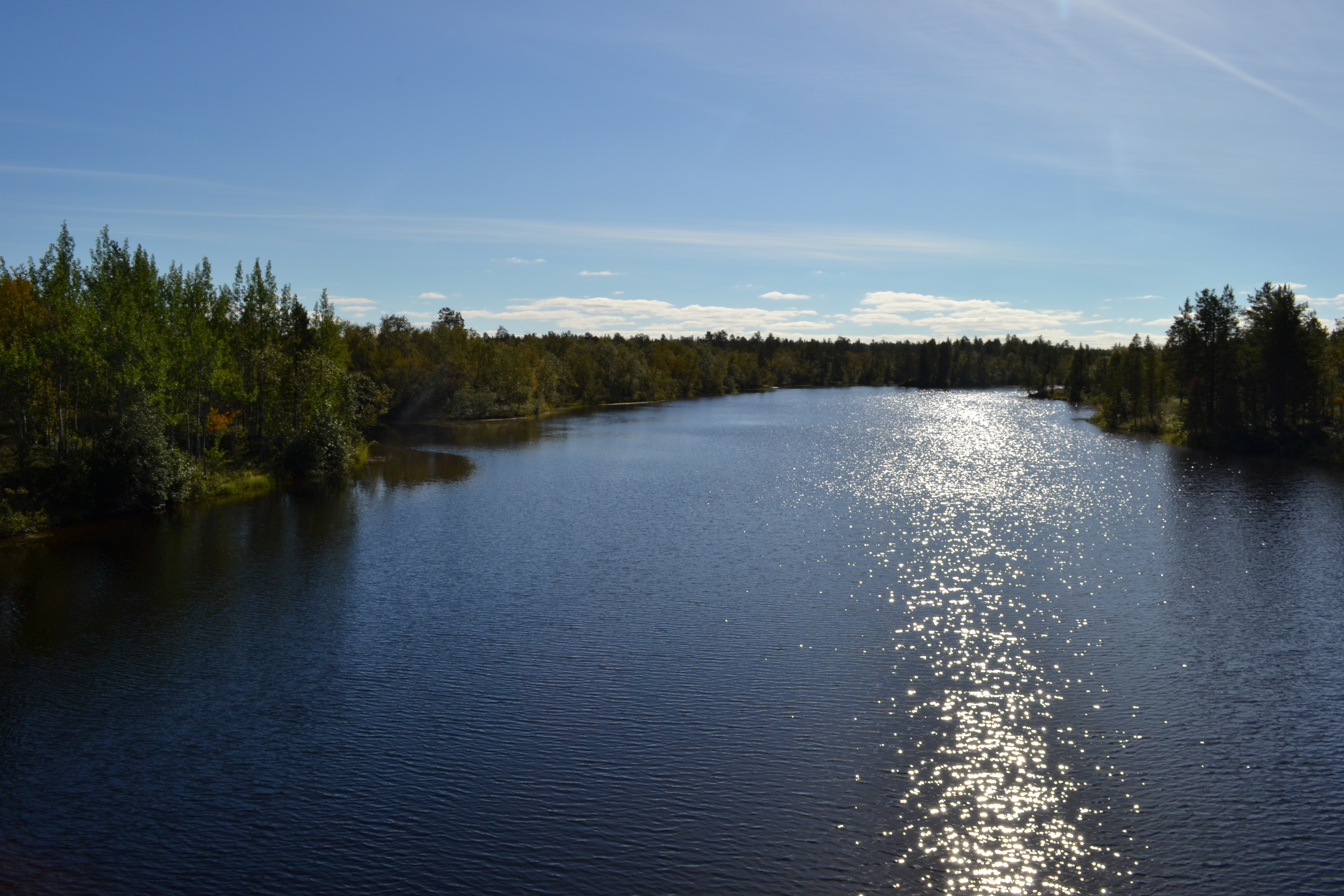
- Native name: Наутсийоки (Russian)

Location
- Country: Russia
- Region: Murmansk Oblast

Physical characteristics
- Source
  - location: Lake Ala-Nautsiyarvi
  - elevation: 153 m (502 ft)
- Mouth: Paatsjoki
- Length: 25 km (16 mi)

Basin features
- Progression: Paatsjoki→ Barents Sea

The Nautsiyoki (Russian: Наутсийоки) is a river in the north of the Kola Peninsula in Murmansk Oblast, Russia. It is 25 kilometers (16 mi) in length. The river originates in the Lake Ala-Nautsiyarvi and flows into the Paatsjoki. Its biggest tributary is the Kokhisevanjoki.
