= Krapivna =

Krapivna (Russian: Крапивна) is the name of several rural localities in Russia:

- Krapivna, Klimovsky District, Bryansk Oblast, a selo in Getmanobudsky Selsoviet of Klimovsky District of Bryansk Oblast
- Krapivna, Starodubsky District, Bryansk Oblast, a village in Mokhonovsky Selsoviet of Starodubsky District of Bryansk Oblast
- Krapivna, Kaluga Oblast, a selo in Ulyanovsky District of Kaluga Oblast
- Krapivna, Monastyrshchinsky District, Smolensk Oblast, name of two villages in Slobodskoye Rural Settlement of Monastyrshchinsky District of Smolensk Oblast
- Krapivna, Roslavlsky District, Smolensk Oblast, a village in Krapivenskoye Rural Settlement of Roslavlsky District of Smolensk Oblast
- Krapivna, Tula Oblast, a selo in Krapivenskaya Rural Administration of Shchyokinsky District of Tula Oblast
- Krapivna, Yaroslavl Oblast, a village in Yudinsky Rural Okrug of Poshekhonsky District of Yaroslavl Oblast
