= Dubna, Soroca =

Dubna
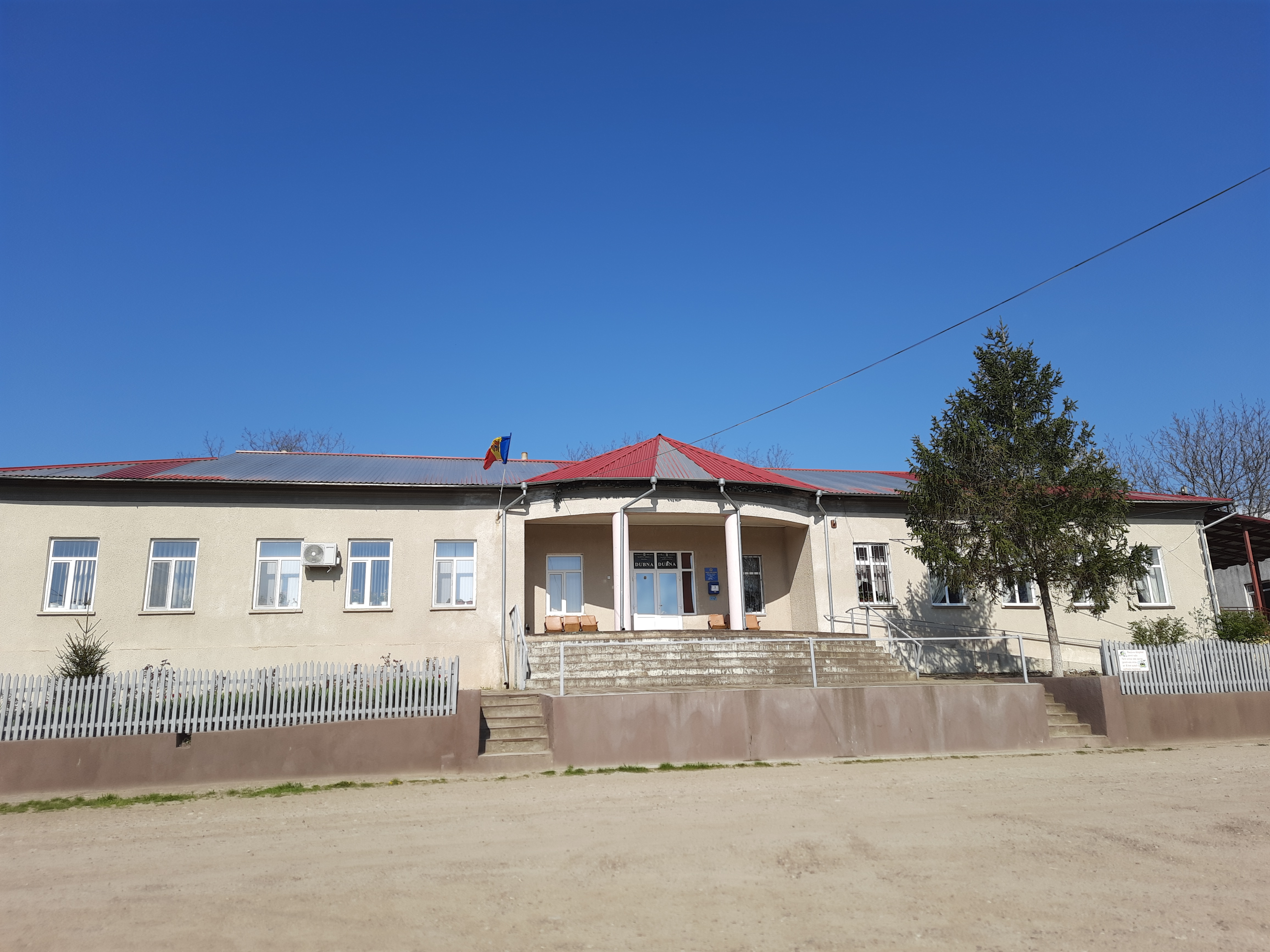

- Location within Moldova
- Coordinates: 48°01′N 28°19′E
- Country: Moldova
- District: Soroca District

Population (2014 census)
  - Total: 663
- Time zone: UTC+2 (EET)
  - Summer (DST): UTC+3 (EEST)

Dubna is a village in Soroca District, Moldova.
