= Uzola =

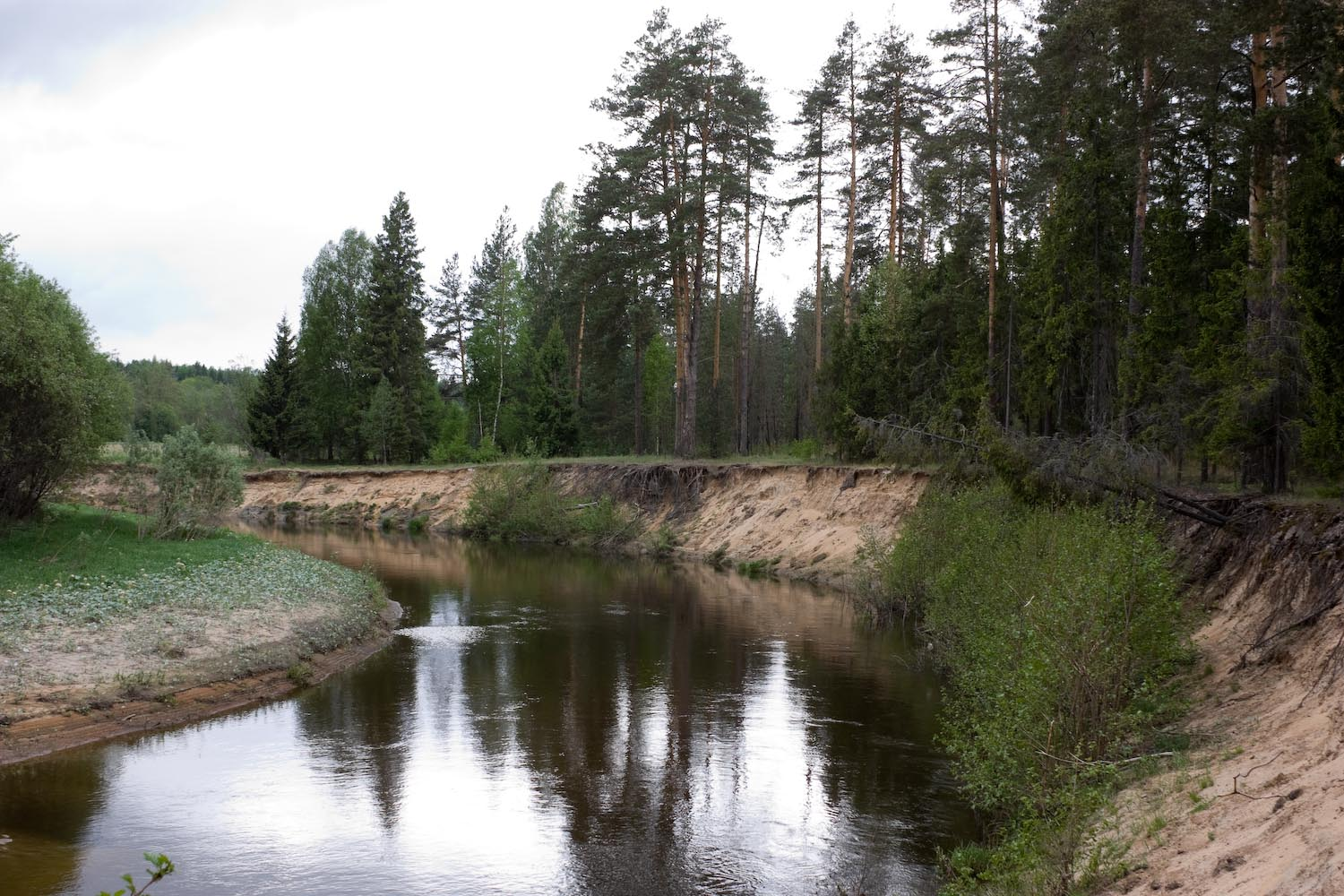
- Steep bank of Uzola
- Native name: Узола (Russian)

Location
- Country: Russia

Physical characteristics
- Mouth: Volga
  - coordinates: 56.5208°N 43.6081°E
- Length: 147 km (91 mi)
- Basin size: 1,920 km^{2} (740 sq mi)

Basin features
- Progression: Volga→ Caspian Sea

The Uzola, also spelled as Usola (Узола, Усола in Russian) is a river in Nizhny Novgorod Oblast in Russia. It is a left tributary of the Volga. The length of the river is 147 km (91 mi). The area of its basin is 1,920 km^{2} (740 sq mi). The Uzola freezes over in November and stays icebound until April.
