= Belaya (Angara) =

Belaya Белая
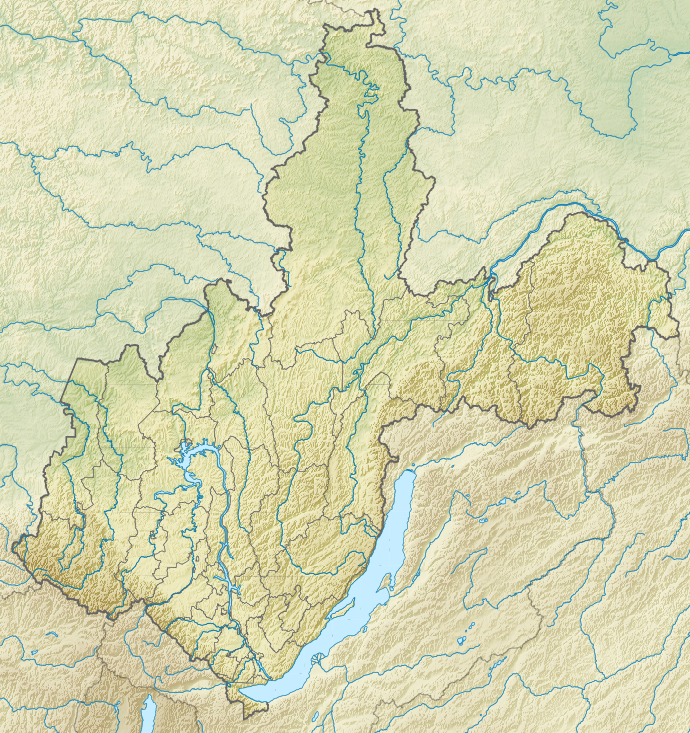
- Mouth location in Irkutsk Oblast, Russia

Location
- Country: Russia

Physical characteristics
- Source: (Bolshaya Belaya), Eastern Sayan
  - elevation: ca 2,100 m (6,900 ft)
- Mouth: Angara
  - location: Bratsk Reservoir
  - coordinates: 52.9169°N 103.6572°E
  - elevation: ca 400 m (1,300 ft)
- Length: 359 km (223 mi)
- Basin size: 18,000 km^{2} (6,900 sq mi)

Basin features
- Progression: Angara→ Yenisey→ Kara Sea

The Belaya (Russian: Бе́лая, Exe Bülen) is a river in Irkutsk Oblast and Buryatia in Russia. The area of its basin is 18,000 square kilometres (6,900 sq mi).

There are nephrite and graphite deposits in the Belaya basin.

== Course ==
The river is a left tributary of the Angara, which flows into the Bratsk Reservoir. It is formed at the confluence of the Bolshaya Belaya (Big Belaya) and Malaya Belaya (Little Belaya). Its length is 359 kilometres (223 mi) from the source of Bolshaya Belaya in the Belskye Goltsy of the Eastern Sayan. Not including the latter the length is 79 kilometres (49 mi).

Besides the Malaya Belaya, the main tributary is the Urik. There are about 400 lakes in the basin. The Belaya freezes up in October or November and stays under ice until April or May.

== See also ==
- List of rivers of Russia
