= Parabel (river) =

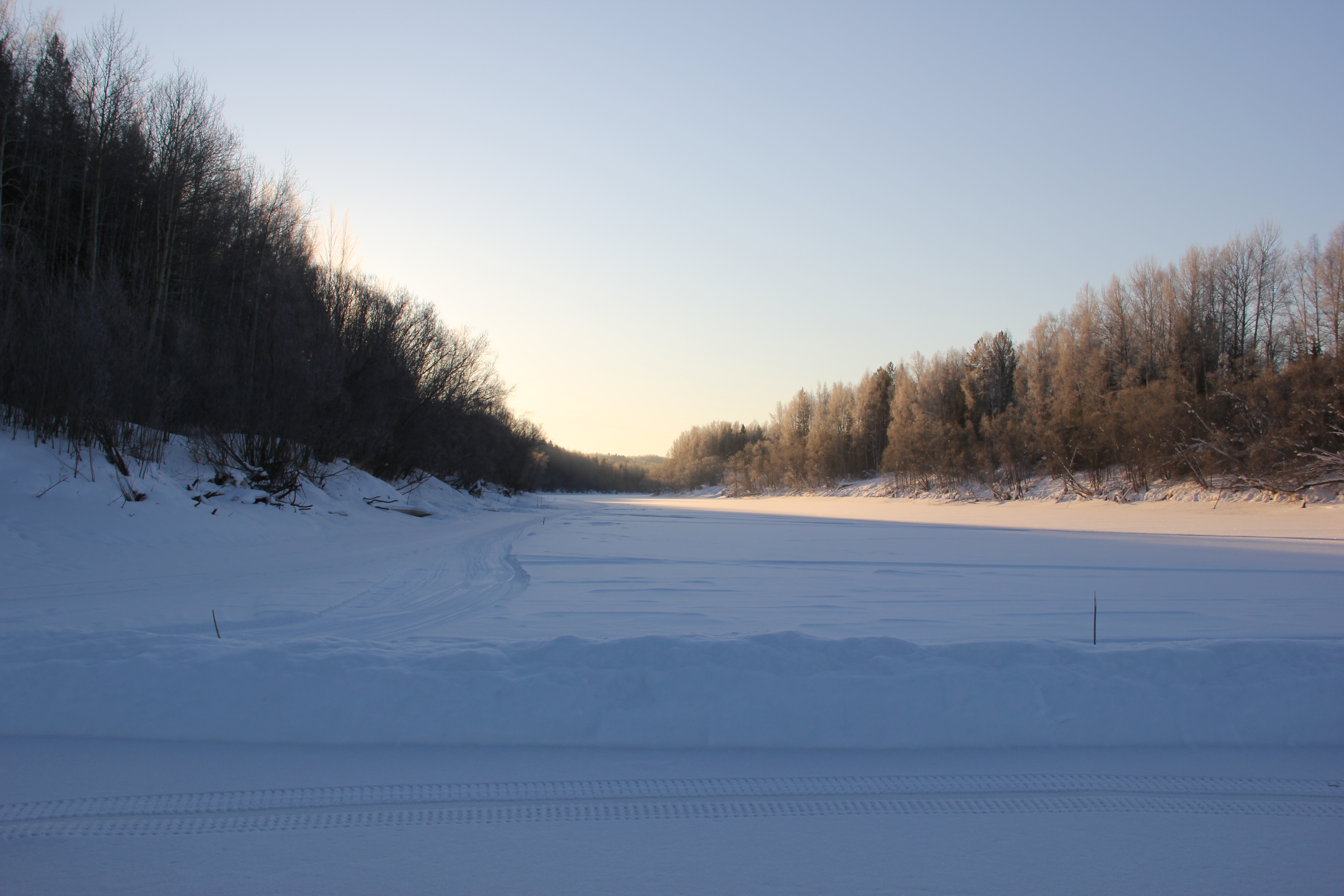

Location
- Country: Russia

Physical characteristics
- Mouth: Ob
  - coordinates: 59.0581°N 80.8978°E
- Length: 308 km (191 mi)
- Basin size: 25,500 km^{2} (9,800 sq mi)

Basin features
- Progression: Ob→ Kara Sea

The Parabel (Russian: Парабель) is a river in the Tomsk Oblast in Russia. It is a left tributary of the Ob. The Parabel is 308 kilometres (191 mi) long, and its basin covers 25,500 square kilometres (9,800 mi^{2}). The river is formed at the confluence of the rivers Kyonga and Chuzik. The Parabel freezes in the second half of October to early November and stays under the ice until late April to early May.
