= Kosovka (river) =

Location
- Country: Russia

Physical characteristics
- Mouth: Chuna
  - coordinates: 57°45′25″N 96°17′17″E
- Length: 27 km (17 mi)

Basin features
- Progression: Chuna→ Taseyeva→ Angara→ Yenisey→ Kara Sea

The Kosovka (Russian: Косовка) is a river in Krasnoyarsk Krai, Russia. It is a left tributary of the Chuna. It is 27 kilometres (17 mi) long.
