= Urik (river) =

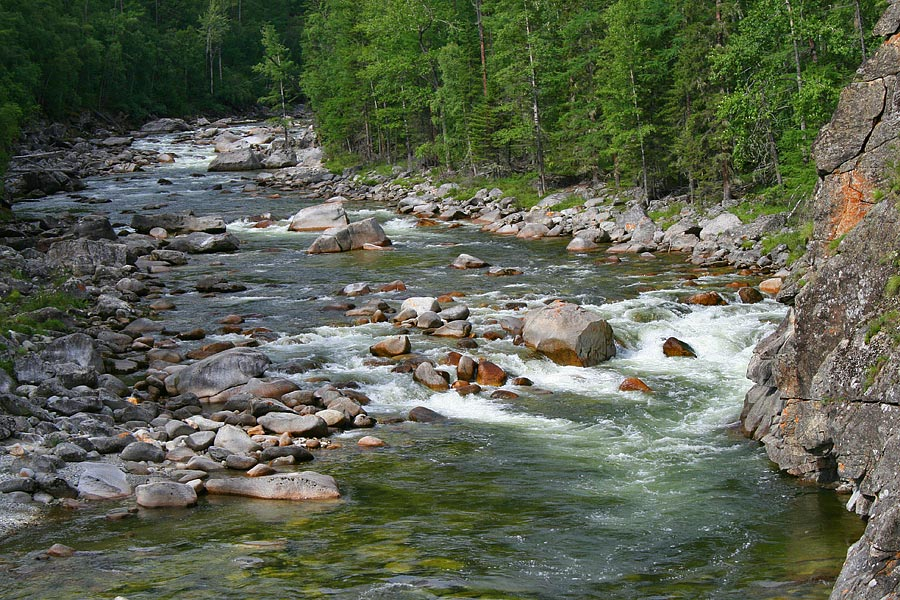

Physical characteristics
- Mouth: Belaya
  - coordinates: 52.9692°N 102.0007°E
- Length: 210 km (130 mi)
- Basin size: 3,520 km^{2} (1,360 sq mi)

Basin features
- Progression: Belaya→ Angara→ Yenisey→ Kara Sea

The Urik (Russian: Урик) is a river in Irkutsk Oblast, Russia. It is a right tributary of the Belaya. It is 210 kilometres (130 mi) long, and has a drainage basin of 3,520 square kilometres (1,360 sq mi).
