= Lida Baday =

Canadian fashion designer

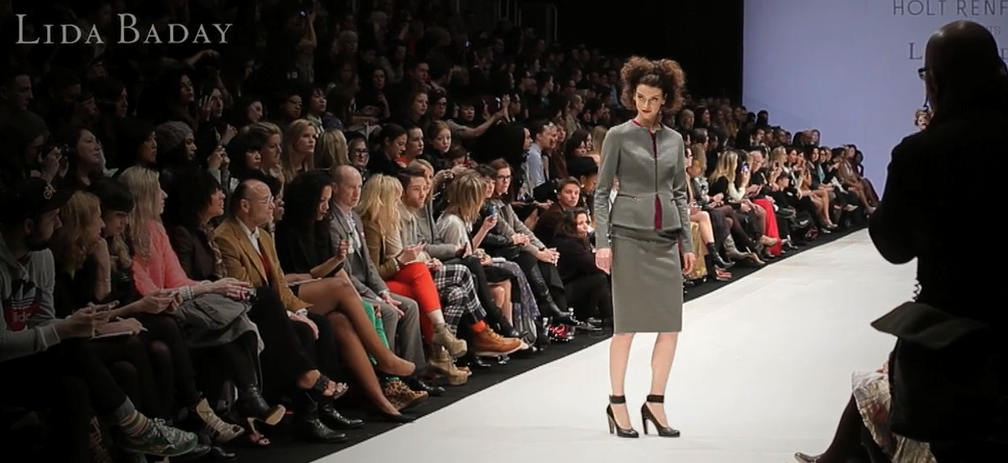
- A Lida Baday design from 2012
- Born: July 31, 1957 (age 68); Hamilton, Ontario
- Occupation: Fashion designer

Lida Baday (born July 31, 1957) is a Canadian fashion designer who exported her designs to the United States. She used her own name as the brand and she was twice Toronto Designer of the Year.

== Life ==
Lida Baday was born in Hamilton, Ontario; her mother was a custom dressmaker. She took fashion studies at Ryerson University (then Ryerson Polytechnic Institute) in Toronto, after originally intending to study languages, and graduated in 1979.

Lida Baday's eponymous womenswear line was founded in 1987 and ran for 27 years before going out of business with the spring 2014 collection. Baday's work is described as "sleek, sculptural, modern," "sophisticated," "feminine," "minimalist," "understated quality," and "streamlined simplicity." She has been called "Canada’s equivalent to Calvin Klein."

Her designs appeared on the covers and in the spreads of Canadian fashion magazines such as Flare. Celebrity clients included Oprah Winfrey, Bo Derek, Brooke Shields, Jeanne Beker, and Sigourney Weaver.

Baday was twice named Toronto's Designer of the Year, in 1992 and 1996. She was awarded the Fil D'Argent by the Maison du Lin in 1990. In 1998, she received the Fashion Group International Toronto chapter's Night of Stars Award. She was added to the Ryerson Alumni Hall of Fame in 1999.

Baday became the first Canadian designer to supply clothing patterns through McCall's, the US-based company, in November 1992. Baday contributed patterns throughout the life of the fashion line. In 1994, Lida Baday opened a New York City showroom and office. The collections were available in Sak's Fifth Avenue, Nordstrom, and Holt Renfrew department stores, and were premiered during Toronto Fashion Week.

After retiring from womenswear in 2014, Lida Baday turned to wholesale supply, continuing to run The Fabric Room in Toronto.

Designers including Joeffer Caoc, Dennis Merotto, and Judy Cornish of Comrags all worked for Lida Baday.
