= Khibiny Mountains =

Mountain range in Murmansk Oblast, Russia

- Хиби́ны / Umptek
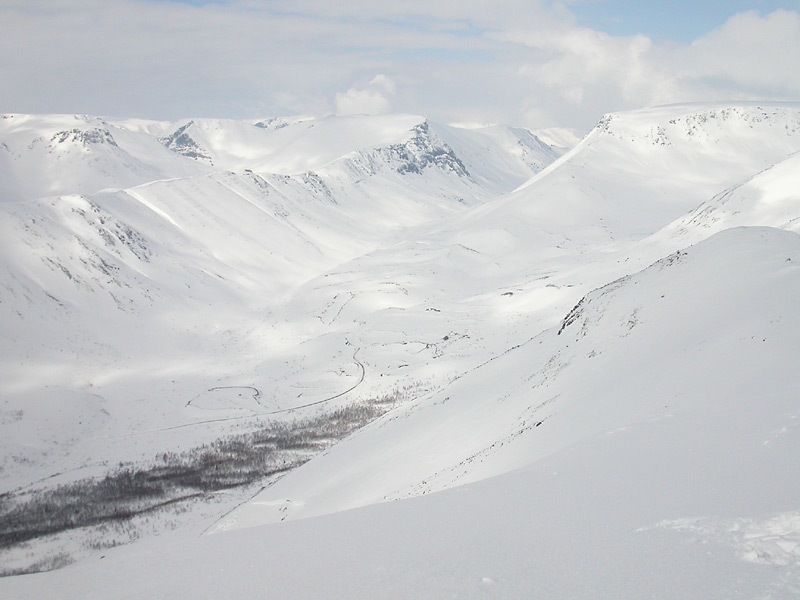
- Khibins in winter

Highest point
- Peak: Yudychvumchorr
- Elevation: 1,201 m (3,940 ft)
- Coordinates: 67°43′21″N 33°28′06″E

Dimensions
- Area: 1,300 km^{2} (500 mi^{2})

Geography
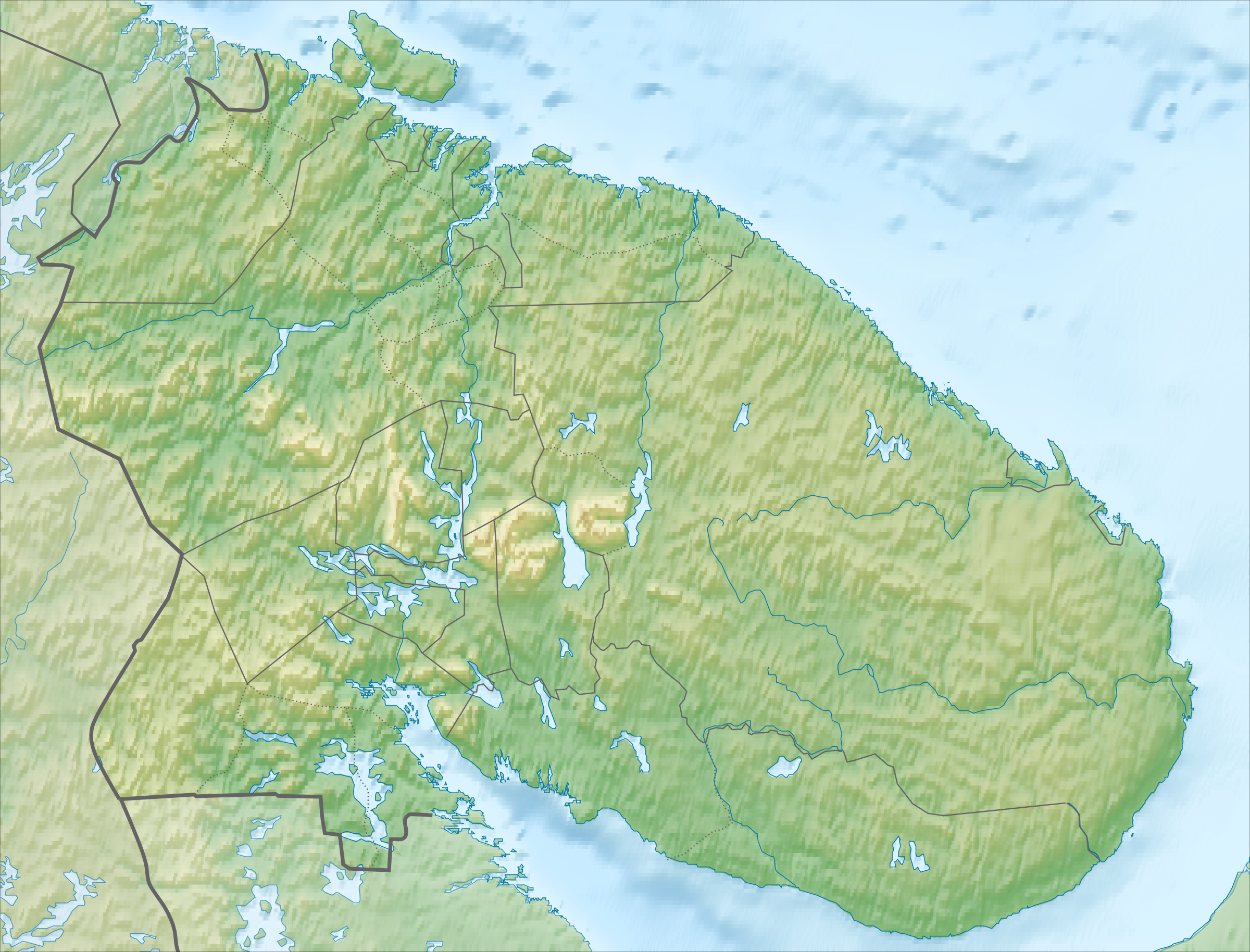
- Location within Murmansk Oblast
- Country: Russia
- Region: Kola Peninsula
- Range coordinates: 67°44.1′N 33°43.6′E

The Khibiny Mountains (Russian: Хиби́ны [xʲɪˈbʲinɨ]; Kildin Sami: Umptek) is one of the two main mountain ranges of the Kola Peninsula, Russia, within the Arctic Circle, located between Imandra and Umbozero lakes. The range is also known as Khibiny Massif, Khibinsky Mountains, Khibinsky Tundras, Khibins or Khibiny. The Khibiny National Park was set up in 2018.

== Geography ==
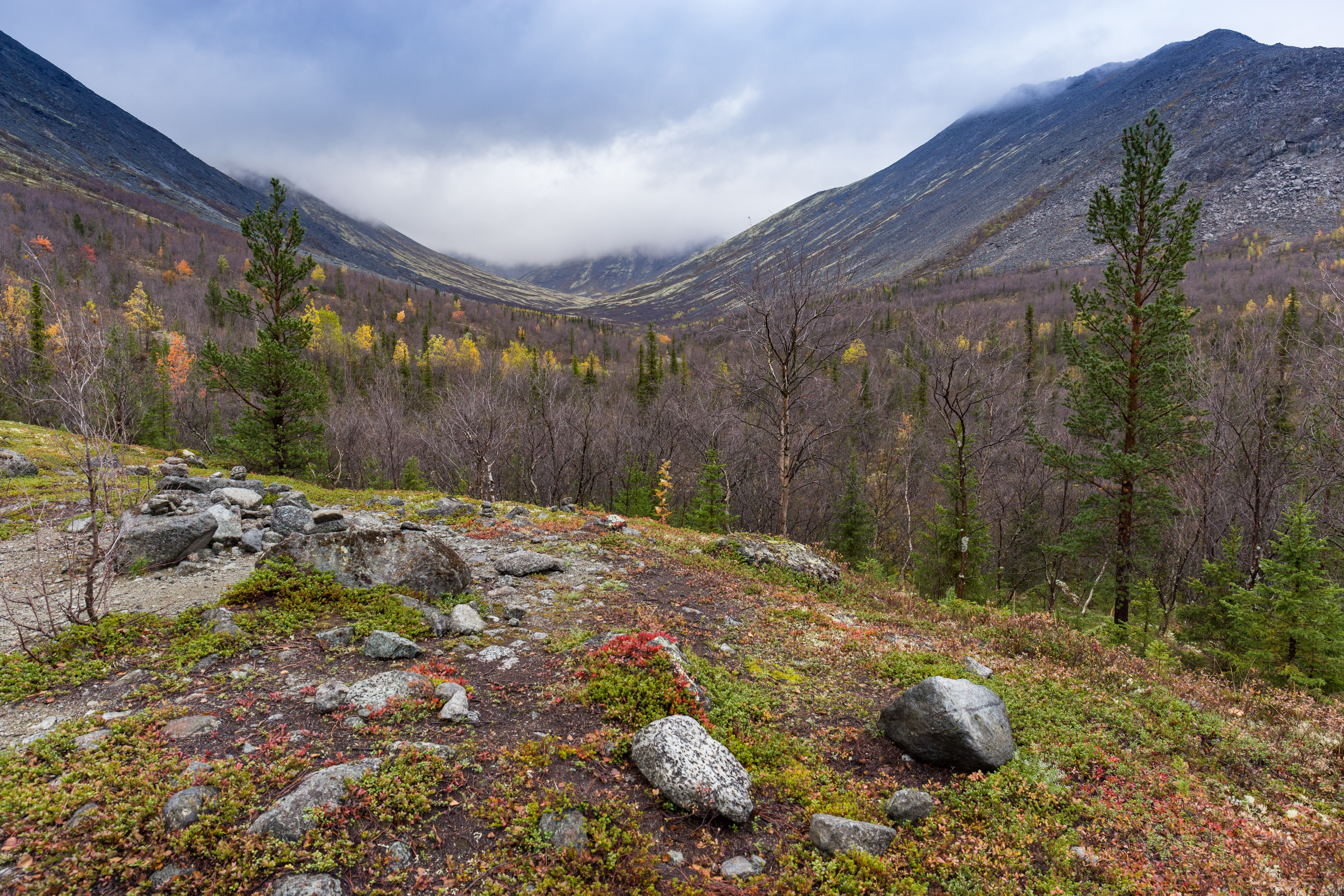
Khibiny in autumn

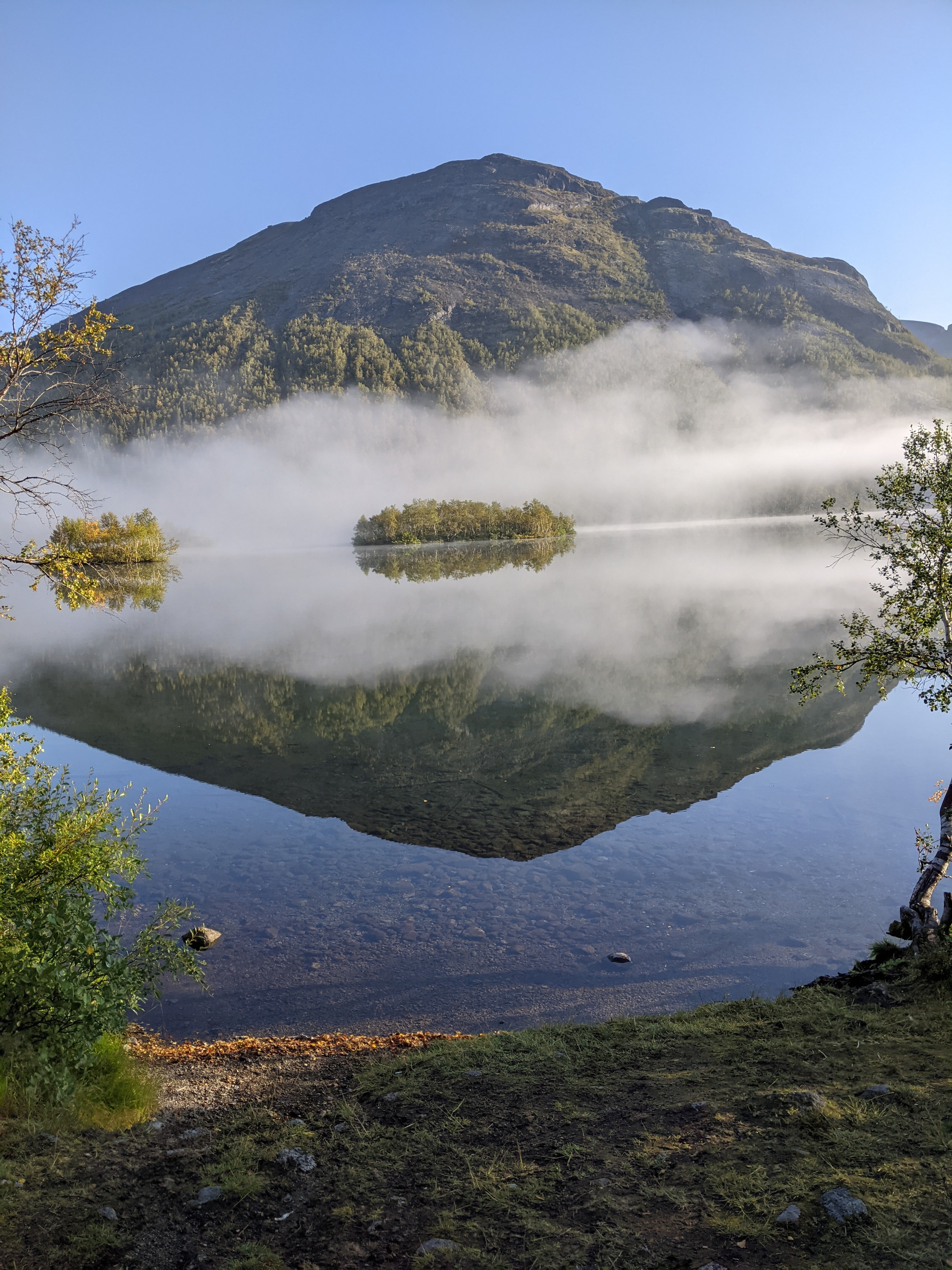
Clear water lake in Khibiny

The Khibiny Massif are the highest mountains of the Kola Peninsula, a large peninsula extending from northern Russia into the Barents and White seas. The total land area of the peninsula is approximately 100,000 square kilometres (39,000 mi^{2}). It is rich in minerals due to the removal of a layer of soil during the last ice age.

The Khibiny Massif is of oval shape of about 1,300 km^{2}. and occupies the central part of the peninsula at a relative elevation of 900–1000 m above the surrounding plain. The mountains are not particularly high; the two highest peaks are the Yudychvumchorr, which stands 1,201 metres (3,940 ft), and the Chasnachorr, which stands 1,191 metres (3,907 ft). The average elevation is 1,116 metres (3,661 ft). The mountains form the shape of a horseshoe topped by a high plateau, drained by a series of deep canyons. The peaks are of plateau type, with steep slopes, with glaciers, icefields and snowfields in some places. The overall terrain is alpine tundra.

The second, and similar mountain range of the Kola Peninsula, the Lovozero Massif, is located about 5 km east from the easternmost point of Khibiny, separated from it by Lake Umbozero.

The Khibiny range is extremely rich in minerals, mainly apatite and nepheline ores. 477 valid minerals have been reported and 108 of those are type localities or minerals first described in the Khibiny. The range is also seismically active.

The Khibiny Mountains are mostly uninhabited, except for one of the world's richest mineral quarries. One of the minerals discovered there is reported to have a potential as a nuclear waste radioactivity absorbent. By the foot of the massif the cities of Apatity and Kirovsk are situated.

=== Climate ===
Khibiny have an Arctic-moderate climate, with an average winter temperature of −5 °C (23 °F). However, the temperature can potentially drop to −30 °C (−22 °F) during the night. The Gulf Stream, which brings warmer water to the Kolsky Peninsula from the north, moderates the climate, making it slightly warmer than other Arctic regions.

== Toponyms in Khibins ==
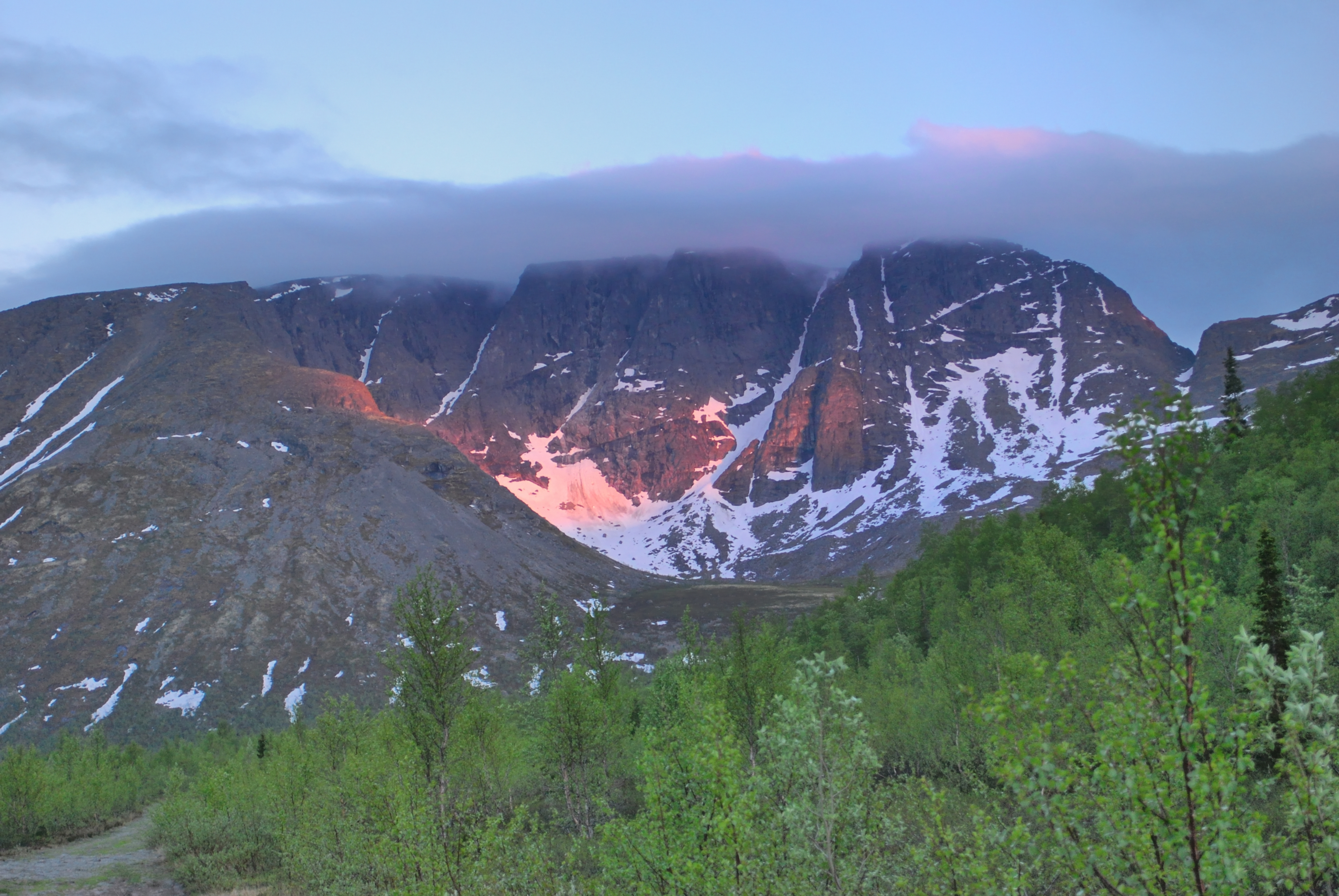
A summer night in the Khibiny

- Mount Aikuaiventchorr
- Mount Eveslogchorr
- Hackman Valley
- Kaskasnyunchorr
- Khibinpakhchorr
- Mount Koashkar
- Mount Koashva
- Kuniok Valley
- Mount Maly Mannepakhk
- Mount Kukisvumchorr
- Marchenko Peak
- Mount Rasvumchorr
- Mount Restin'yun
- Mount Yukspor
- Loparskaya Valley
- Mount Nyorkpakhk (Niorkpakhk, N'orkpukhk, N'Yourpakhk)
- Mount Partomchorr
- Petrelius River
- Mount Rischorr
- Mount Takhtarvumchorr
- Tuliylukht Bay
- Vuonnemiok River
- Imandra Lake
- Yum'egor Pass
- Mount Vud'yavrchorr (with botanical garden of polar-alpine flora)
