= Vishera (Komi Republic) =

- The Vishera within the Northern Dvina basin.

Location
- Country: Russia

Physical characteristics
- Mouth: Vychegda
  - coordinates: 61°55′43″N 52°24′29″E
- Length: 247 km (153 mi)
- Basin size: 8,780 km^{2} (3,390 sq mi)
- Discharge
  - average: 79.1 m^{3}/s (2,790 cu ft/s)

Basin features
- Progression: Vychegda→ Northern Dvina→ White Sea

The Vishera (Russian: Вишера, also Вышера – Vyshera) is a river in the Komi Republic in Russia, a right tributary of the Vychegda. It is 247 kilometres (153 mi) long, and its drainage basin covers 8,780 square kilometres (3,390 mi^{2}). The Vishera River freezes up in November and stays under the ice until April.
