= Sok (river) =

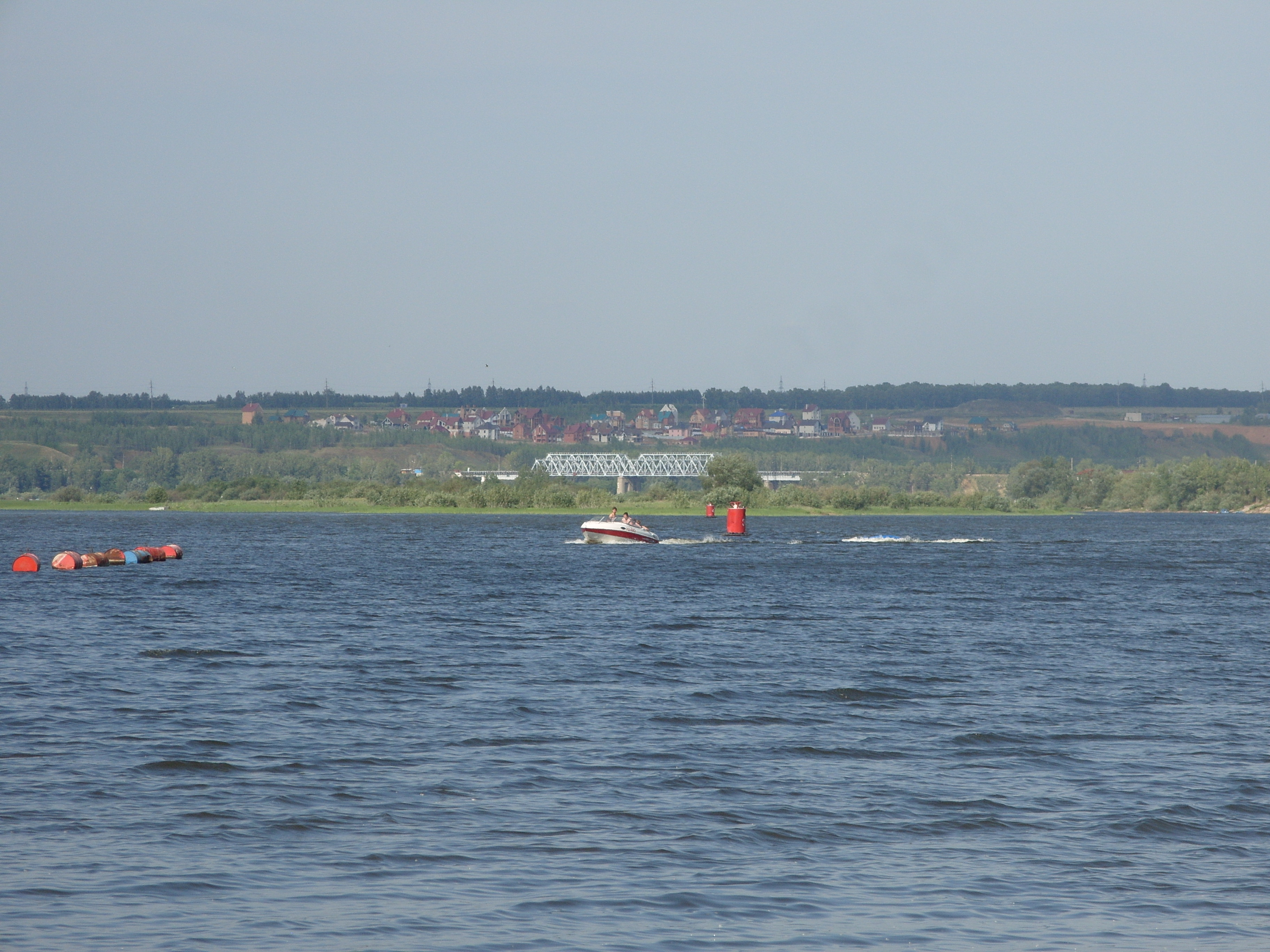

Location
- Country: Russia

Physical characteristics
- Source
  - location: Bugulma-Belebey Hills
- Mouth: Volga
  - location: Saratov Reservoir
  - coordinates: 53°24′33″N 50°07′56″E
- Length: 364 km (226 mi)
- Basin size: 11,700 km^{2} (4,500 sq mi)
- Discharge
  - average: 33.3 m^{3}/s (1,180 cu ft/s)

Basin features
- Progression: Volga→ Caspian Sea

Sok (Russian: Сок) is a river in Samara and Orenburg Oblasts, Russia, a left tributary of the Volga. It is 364 kilometres (226 mi) long, and its drainage basin covers 11,700 square kilometres (4,500 mi^{2}). It flows southwest to meet the Samara Bend of the Volga near Sokolyi Mountains, north of the city of Samara. The major tributary is Kondurcha.

Europe's oldest pottery was found on the banks of the Sok River (see Elshanka culture for details).
