= Pra (Russia) =

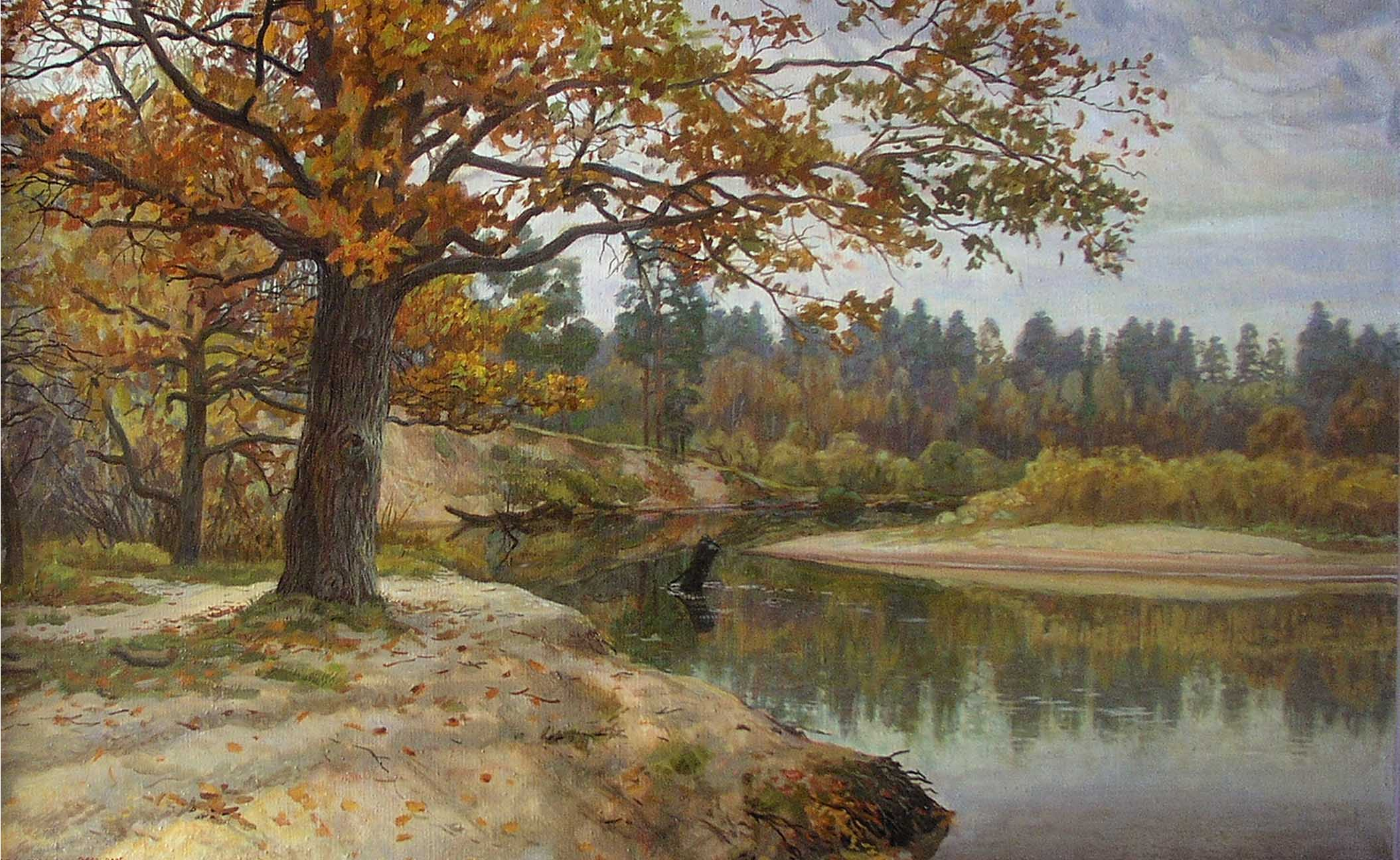
- Native name: Пра (Russian)

Location
- Country: Russia

Physical characteristics
- Mouth: Oka
  - coordinates: 54°44′52″N 41°00′34″E
- Length: 167 km (104 mi)
- Basin size: 5,520 km^{2} (2,130 sq mi)

Basin features
- Progression: Oka→ Volga→ Caspian Sea

The Pra (Russian: Пра) is a river in the Ryazan and Moscow Oblasts in Russia, a left tributary of the Oka. It is 167 kilometres (104 mi) in length. The area of its basin is 5,520 square kilometres (2,130 sq mi). The Pra River freezes up in late November and stays under the ice until April.
