= Lama (river) =

River in Moscow and Tver Oblasts, Russia

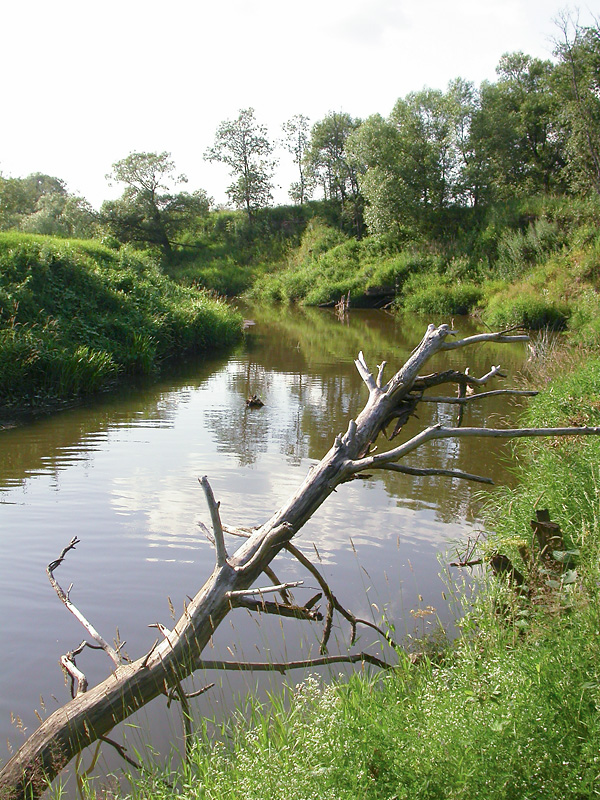
- Native name: Ла́ма (Russian)

Location
- Country: Russia

Physical characteristics
- Mouth: Shosha
  - coordinates: 56.5209°N 36.1709°E
- Length: 139 km (86 mi)
- Basin size: 2,330 km^{2} (900 sq mi)

Basin features
- Progression: Shosha→ Volga→ Caspian Sea

The Lama (Russian: Ла́ма) is a river in the Moscow and Tver Oblasts in Russia, a tributary of the Shosha. The river is 139 kilometres (86 mi) long. The area of its drainage basin is 2,330 square kilometres (900 mi^{2}). The Lama River freezes up in November and stays under the ice until late March or early April. Historically, the river was a part of the important waterway from the Volga to the Moskva. The city of Volokolamsk that has been standing on the Lama since the 12th century was previously known as Volok Lamsky (literally - Drag of Lama) after the process of a watercraft portage.
