= Rutka (river) =

Location
- Country: Russia

Physical characteristics
- Source
  - location: Kirov Oblast, Russia
- Mouth: Volga
  - location: Cheboksary Reservoir
  - coordinates: 56°25′39″N 46°36′25″E
- Length: 153 km (95 mi)
- Basin size: 1,950 km^{2} (750 sq mi)
- Discharge
  - average: 7.32 m^{3}/s (259 cu ft/s)

Basin features
- Progression: Volga→ Caspian Sea

The Rutka (Mari: Рӹде, Rÿde; Russian: Рутка) is a river in Kirov Oblast and Mari El, Russia. It is 153 kilometres (95 mi) long, and has a drainage basin of 1,950 square kilometres (750 sq mi). The Rutka rises in Kirov Oblast, passes the Mari Depression and flows to the Cheboksary Reservoir. The Rutka freezes up in November and stays under ice until April. The river is navigable.
