= Nyomda =

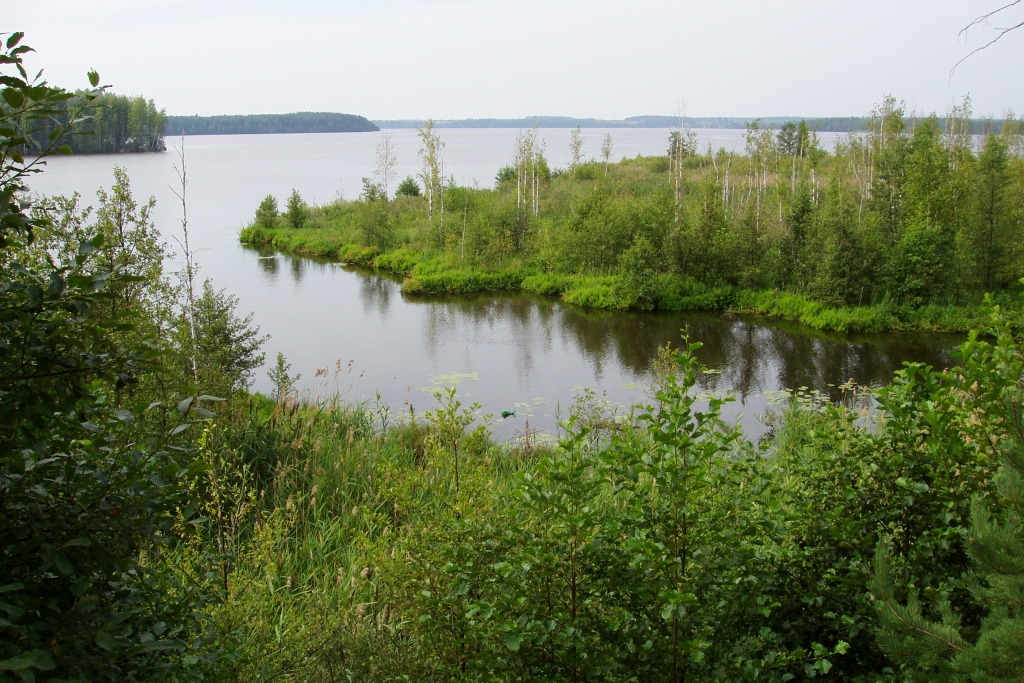
- Native name: Нёмда (Russian)

Location
- Country: Russia

Physical characteristics
- Mouth: Volga
  - location: Gorky Reservoir
  - coordinates: 57.4158°N 43.1994°E
- Length: 146 km (91 mi)
- Basin size: 4,750 km^{2} (1,830 sq mi)

Basin features
- Progression: Volga→ Caspian Sea

The Nyomda (Russian: Нёмда) is a river in Kostroma Oblast and Ivanovo Oblast in Russia, a left tributary of the Volga. It flows into the Nyomda Bay of the Gorky Reservoir of the Volga River. The river is 146 kilometres (91 mi) long, and its drainage basin covers 4,750 square kilometres (1,830 mi^{2}).

The Nyomda freezes up in November and remains icebound until mid-April. Its largest tributary is the Shuya.
