= Kondurcha =

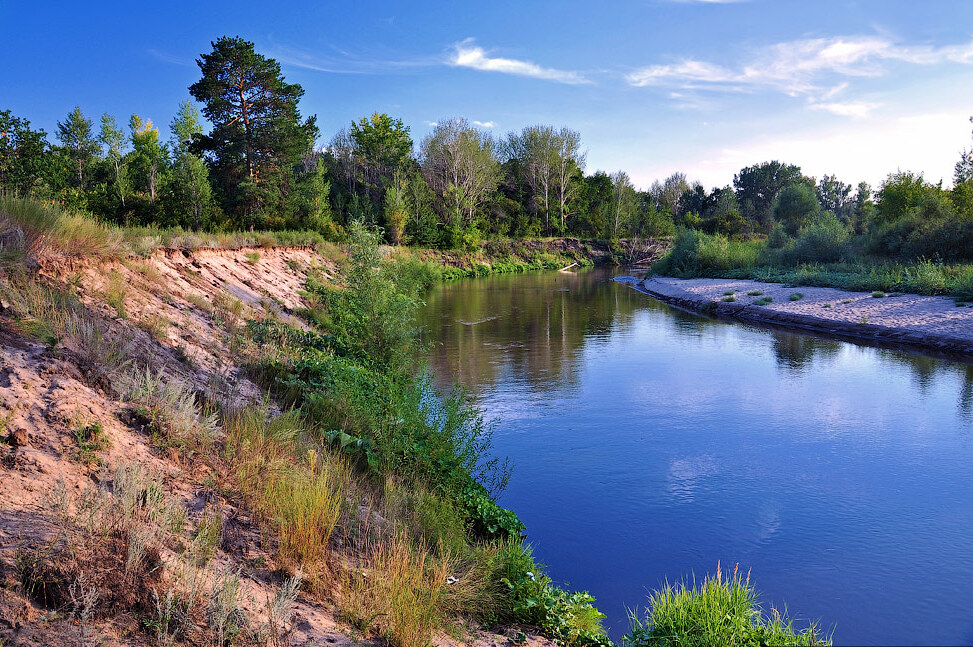

Location
- Country: Tatarstan and Samara Oblast, Russia

Physical characteristics
- Source
  - location: Samara Oblast
- Mouth: Sok
  - location: Samara Oblast
  - coordinates: 53°30′17″N 50°22′48″E
- Length: 294 km (183 mi)
- Basin size: 4,360 km^{2} (1,680 sq mi)
- Discharge
  - average: 9.44 m^{3}/s (333 cu ft/s)

Basin features
- Progression: Sok→ Volga→ Caspian Sea

The Kondurcha (Russian: Кондурча; Tatar: Кондырча, romanized: Qondırça) is a river in Samara Oblast and Tatarstan, Russian Federation, a right-bank tributary of the river Sok. It is 294 kilometres (183 mi) long, of which 25 kilometres (16 mi) are in Tatarstan, and its drainage basin covers 4,360 square kilometres (1,680 mi^{2}). It begins in Samara Oblast and flows to the Sok in Samara Oblast.

Major tributaries are the Shlama and Lipovka rivers. The maximal mineralization 700–800 mg/L. Nurlat is along the river.

== See also ==
- Battle of the Kondurcha River
