= Palata (river) =

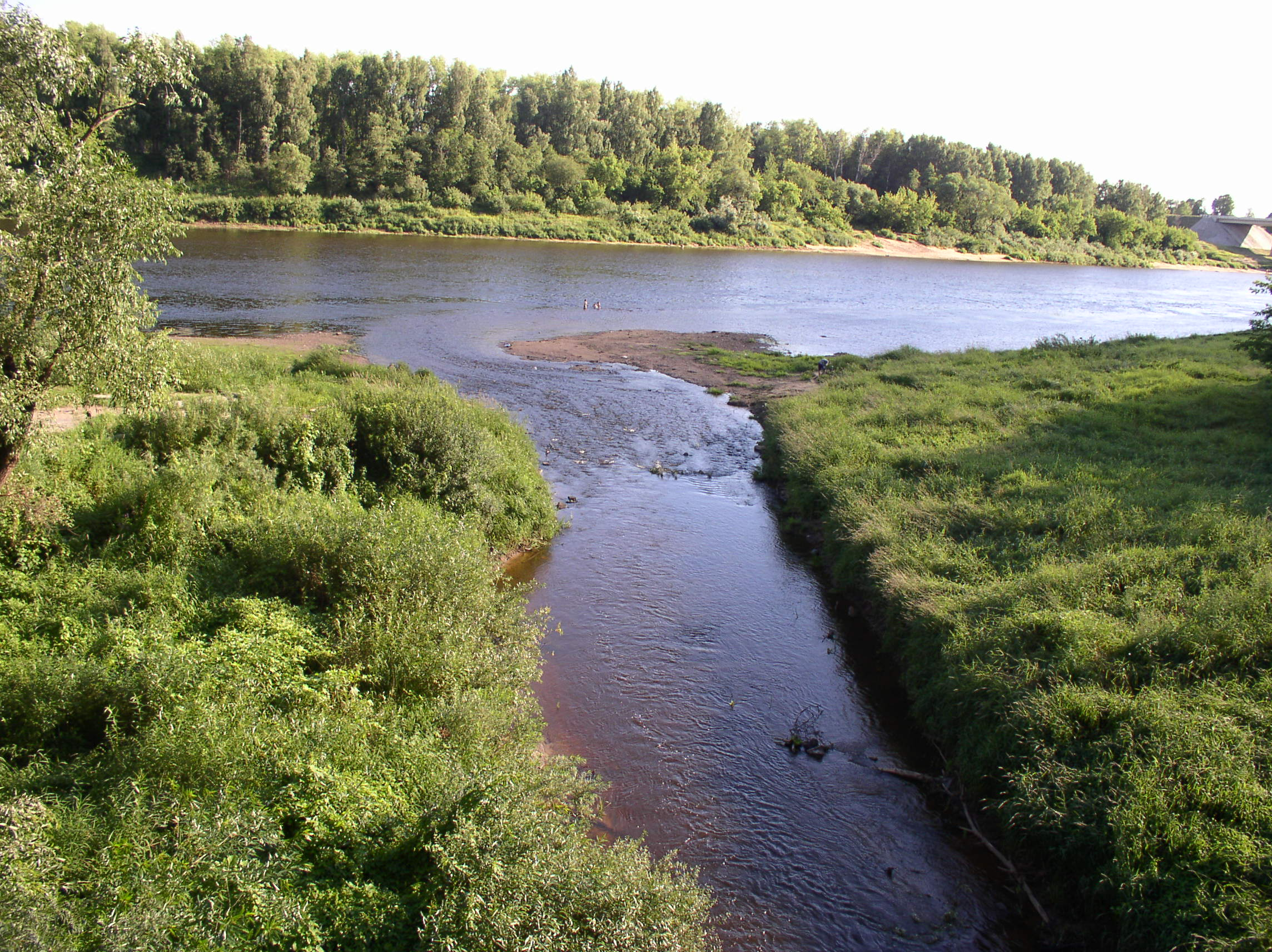
- Junction of Western Dvina and Palata rivers

Location
- Country: Belarus, Russia

Physical characteristics
- Source
  - location: Russia
- Mouth: Daugava (Western Dvina)
  - coordinates: 55.4847°N 28.7558°E
- Length: 93 km (58 mi)

Basin features
- Progression: Daugava→ Baltic Sea

The Palata (Belarusian: Палата́) or Polota (Russian: Полота́) is a river in Belarus and Russia. The 93 kilometers long Palata is a tributary of the Western Dvina river. Rising in Pskov Oblast of Russia and flowing through northern Belarus, it merges with the Western Dvina at Polatsk.

Palata receives its name from Lithuanian Puolauta, meaning 'falling into', i.e., the river which flows into a bigger river.
