= Shuya (Kostroma Oblast) =

- Native name: Шуя (Russian)

Location
- Country: Russia

Physical characteristics
- Mouth: Nyomda
  - coordinates: 57.9175°N 43.2478°E
- Length: 170 km (110 mi)
- Basin size: 1,700 km^{2} (660 sq mi)

Basin features
- Progression: Nyomda→ Volga→ Caspian Sea

The Shuya (Russian: Шуя) is a river in Kostroma Oblast in Russia, a left tributary of the Nyomda (Volga's basin). The river is 170 kilometres (110 mi) long, and its drainage basin covers 1,700 square kilometres (660 mi^{2}). It freezes up in November and stays icebound until April.
