= Solar eclipse of August 1, 2008 =

Total eclipse

- Total eclipse
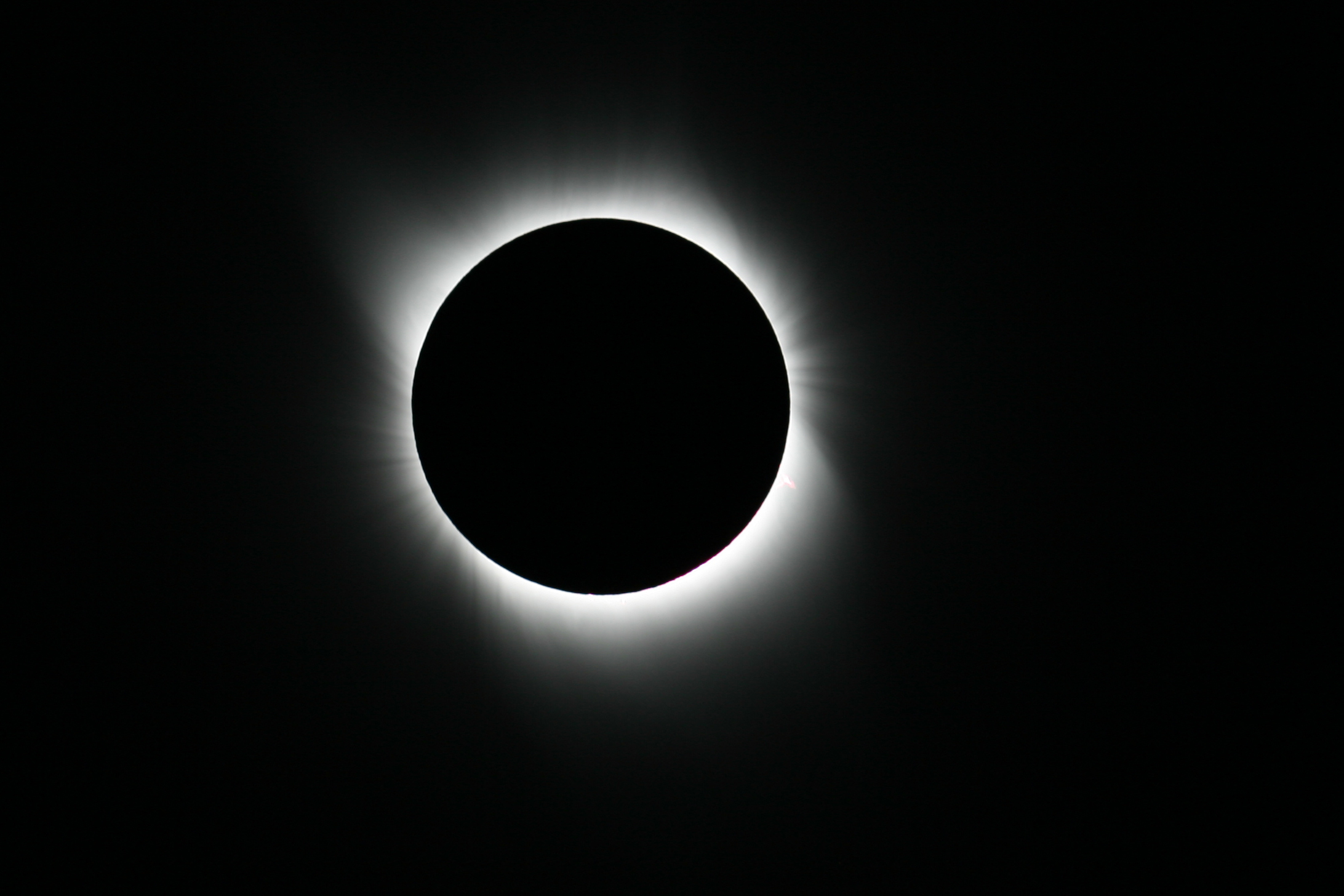
- Totality showing corona from Kumul, Xinjiang

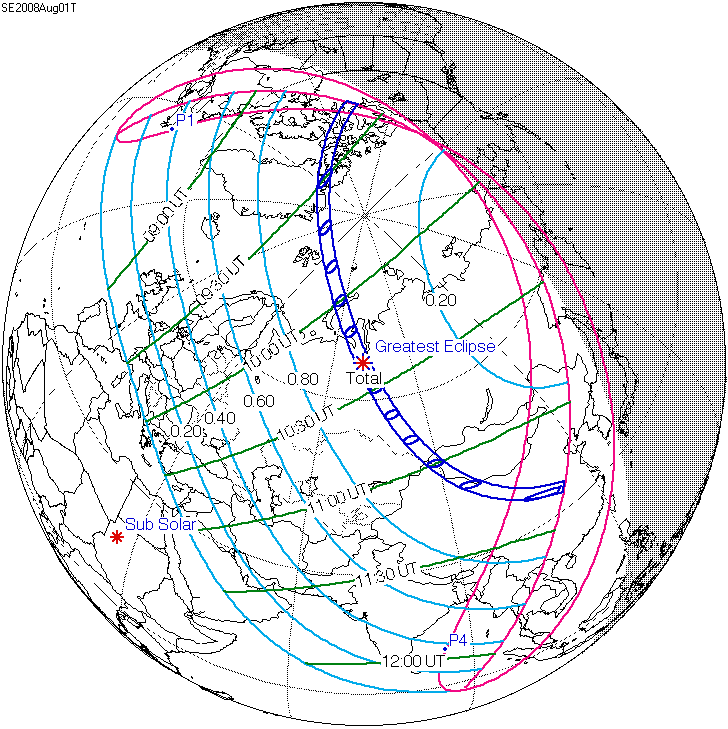
- Map
- Gamma: 0.8307
- Magnitude: 1.0394

Maximum eclipse
- Duration: 147 s (2 min 27 s)
- Coordinates: 65.7°N 72.3°E
- Max. width of band: 237 km (147 mi)

Times (UTC)
- (P1) Partial begin: 04:06.8
- (U1) Total begin: 21:07.3
- Greatest eclipse: 10:22:12
- (U4) Total end: 21:28.3
- (P4) Partial end: 38:27.7

References
- Saros: 126 (47 of 72)
- Catalog # (SE5000): 9526

A total solar eclipse occurred at the Moon's descending node of orbit on Friday, August 1, 2008, with a magnitude of 1.0394. A solar eclipse occurs when the Moon passes between Earth and the Sun, thereby totally or partly obscuring the image of the Sun for a viewer on Earth. A total solar eclipse occurs when the Moon's apparent diameter is larger than the Sun's, blocking all direct sunlight, turning day into darkness. Totality occurs in a narrow path across Earth's surface, with the partial solar eclipse visible over a surrounding region thousands of kilometres wide. Occurring about 2.4 days after perigee (on July 30, 2008, at 0:20 UTC), the Moon's apparent diameter was larger.

The eclipse was visible from a narrow corridor through northern Canada (Nunavut), Greenland, central Russia, eastern Kazakhstan, western Mongolia and China. Visible north of the Arctic Circle, it belonged to the so-called midnight sun eclipses. The largest city in its path was Novosibirsk in Russia. A partial eclipse could be seen from the much broader path of the Moon's penumbra, including northern Canada, Greenland, and most of Europe and Asia.

The moon's apparent diameter was 1 arcminute, 17.8 arcseconds (77.8 arcseconds) larger than the annular solar eclipse of February 7, 2008.

It was described by observers as "special for its colours around the horizon. There were wonderful oranges and reds all around, the clouds lit up, some dark in silhouette, some golden, glowing yellowy-orange in the distance. You could see the shadow approaching against the clouds and then rushing away as it left."

== Start of eclipse: Canada and Greenland ==
Animated path

The eclipse began in the far north of Canada in Nunavut at 09:21 UT, the zone of totality being 206 km wide, and lasting for 1 minute 30 seconds. The path of the eclipse then headed north-east, crossing over northern Greenland and reaching the northernmost latitude of 83° 47′ at 09:38 UT before dipping down into Russia.

The path of totality touched the northeast corner of Kvitøya, an uninhabited Norwegian island in the Svalbard archipelago, at 09:47 UT.

== Greatest eclipse: Russia ==
The eclipse reached the Russian mainland at 10:10 UT, with a path 232 km wide and a duration of 2 minutes 26 seconds. The greatest eclipse occurred shortly after, at 10:21:07 UT at coordinates 65°39′N 72°18′E (close to Nadym), when the path was 237 km wide, and the duration was 2 minutes 27 seconds. Cities in the path of the total eclipse included Megion, Nizhnevartovsk, Strezhevoy, Novosibirsk and Barnaul. Around 10,000 tourists were present in Novosibirsk, the largest city to experience the eclipse. For Gorno-Altaysk the eclipse was the second consecutive total solar eclipse after the March 2006 eclipse.

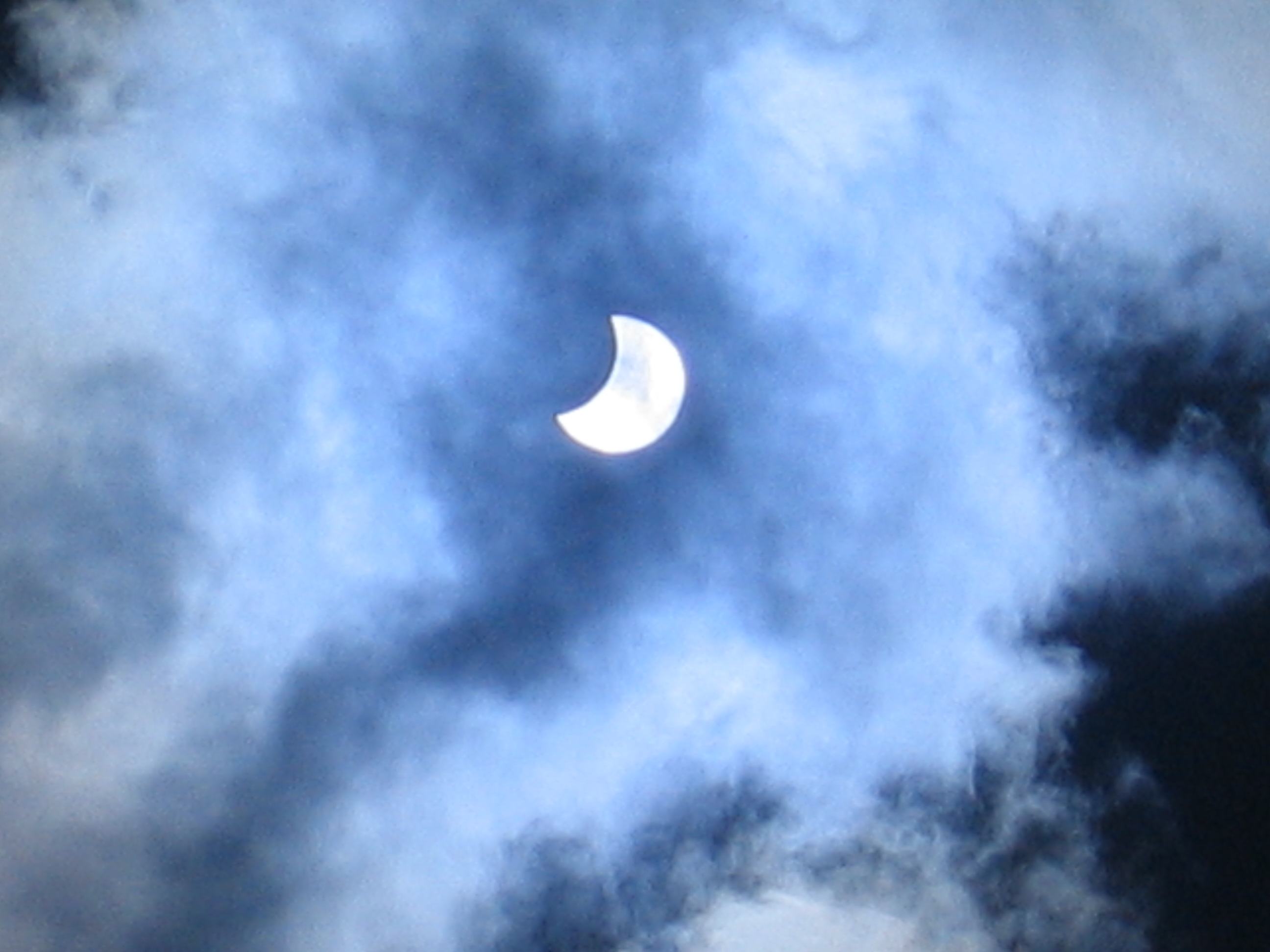
Partial from Dmitrov

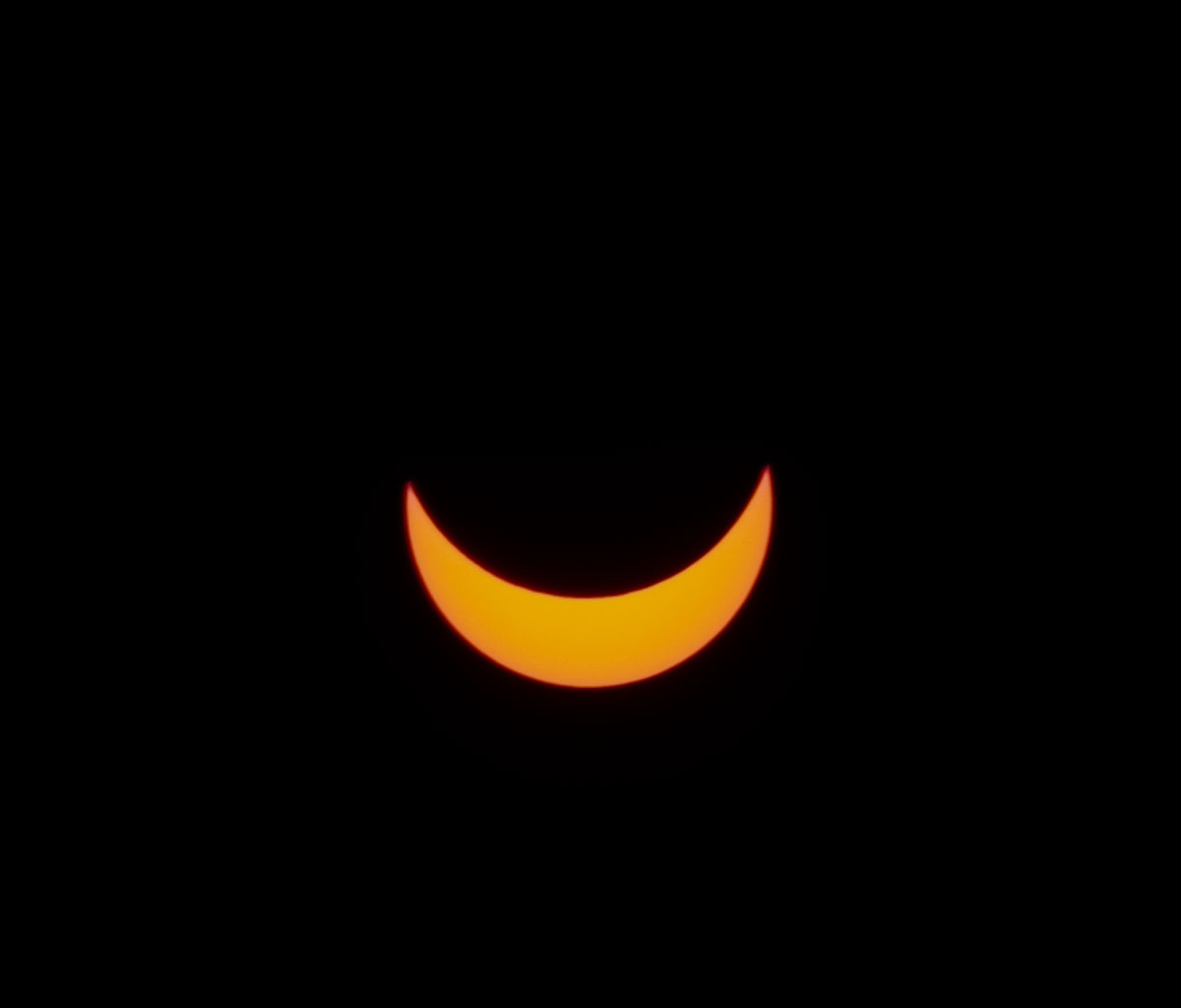
Magnitogorsk at maximum phrase

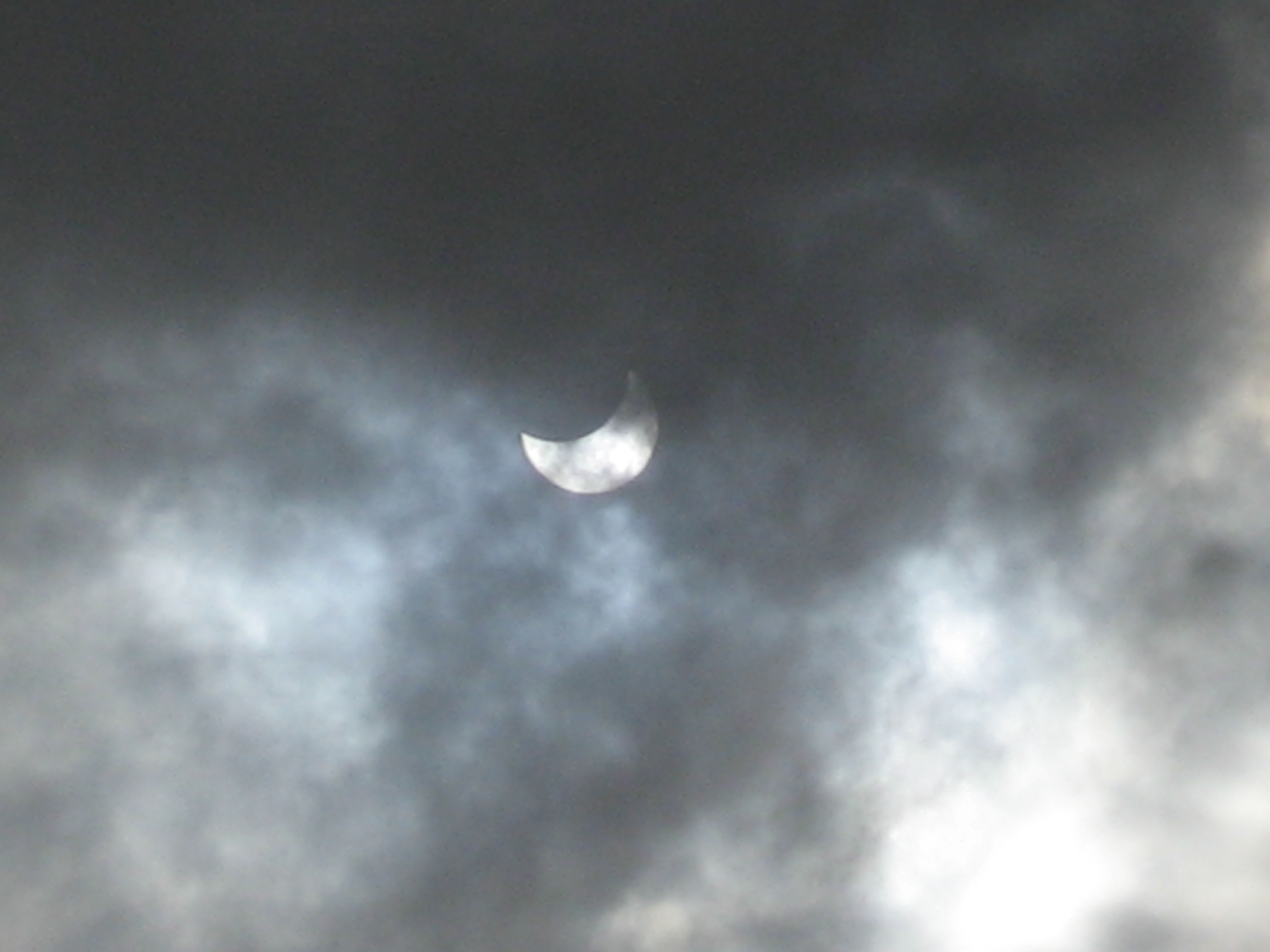
Partial from Moscow, Russia

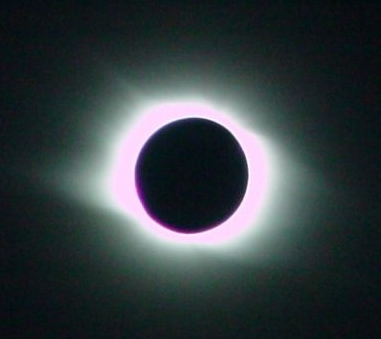
Totality from Akademgorodok (Novosibirsk)

Video from Novosibirsk

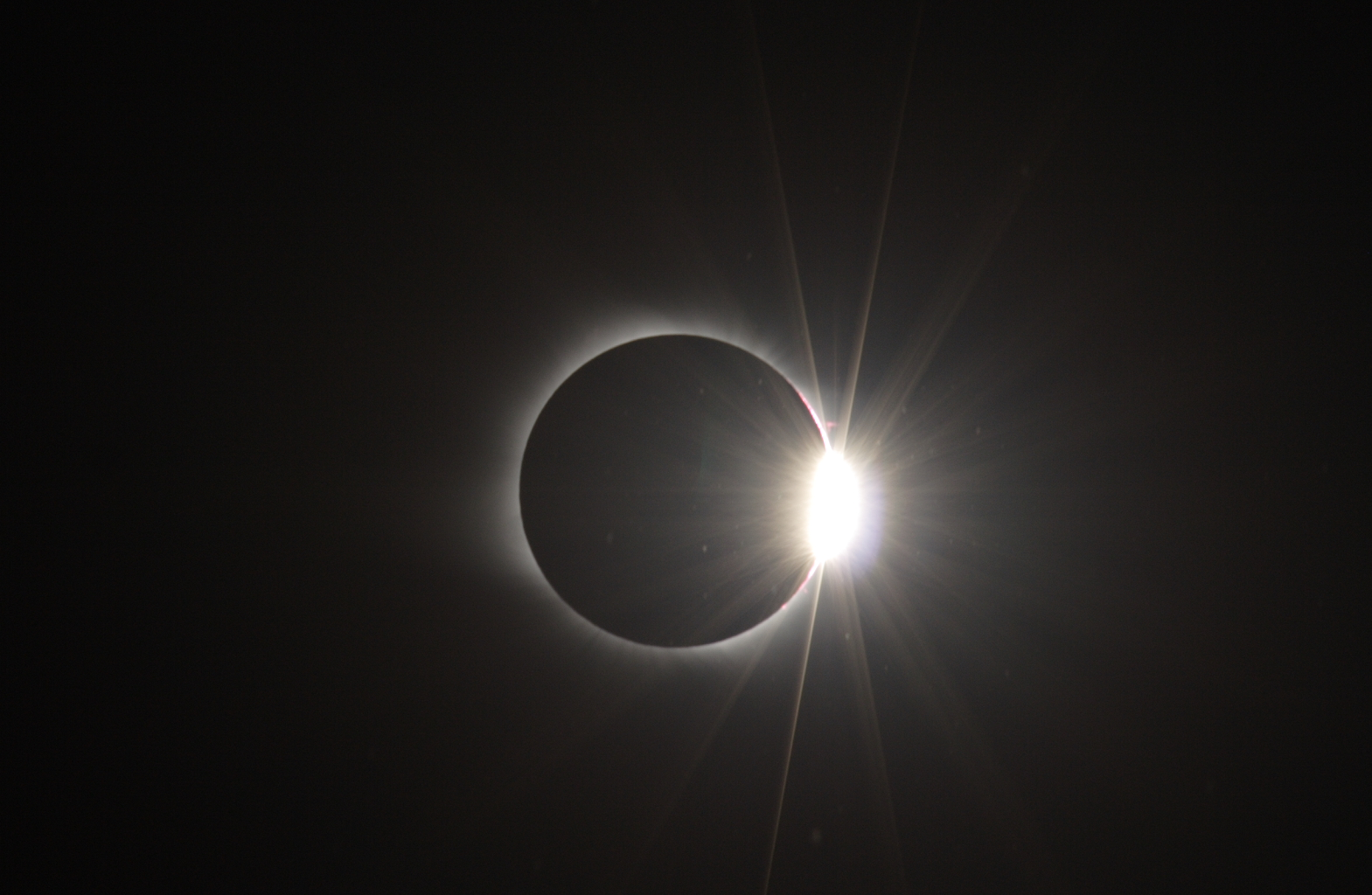
Diamond ring effect in Novosibirsk

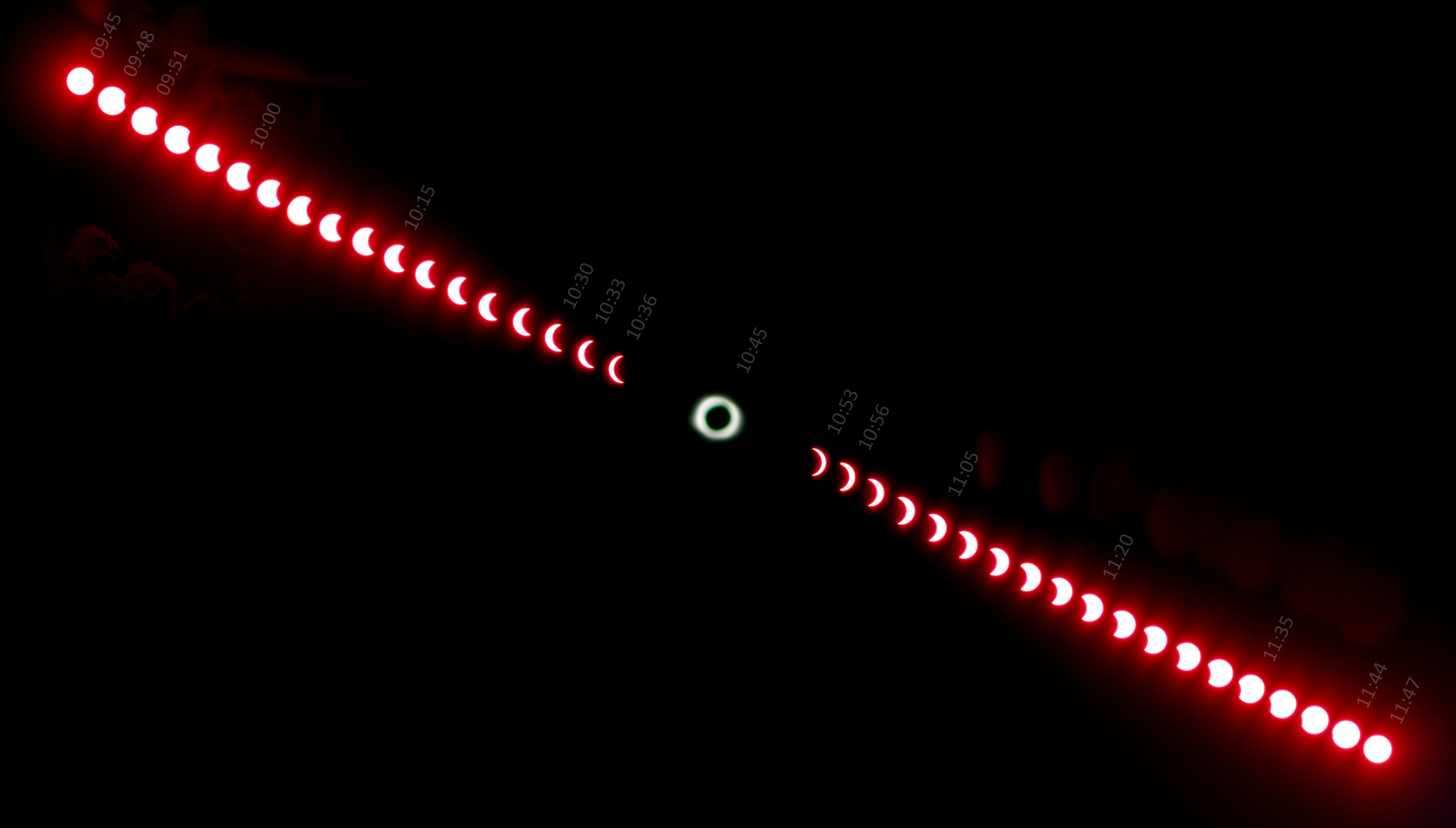
Eclipse progression in Novosibirsk. All times UTC (local time UTC+7)

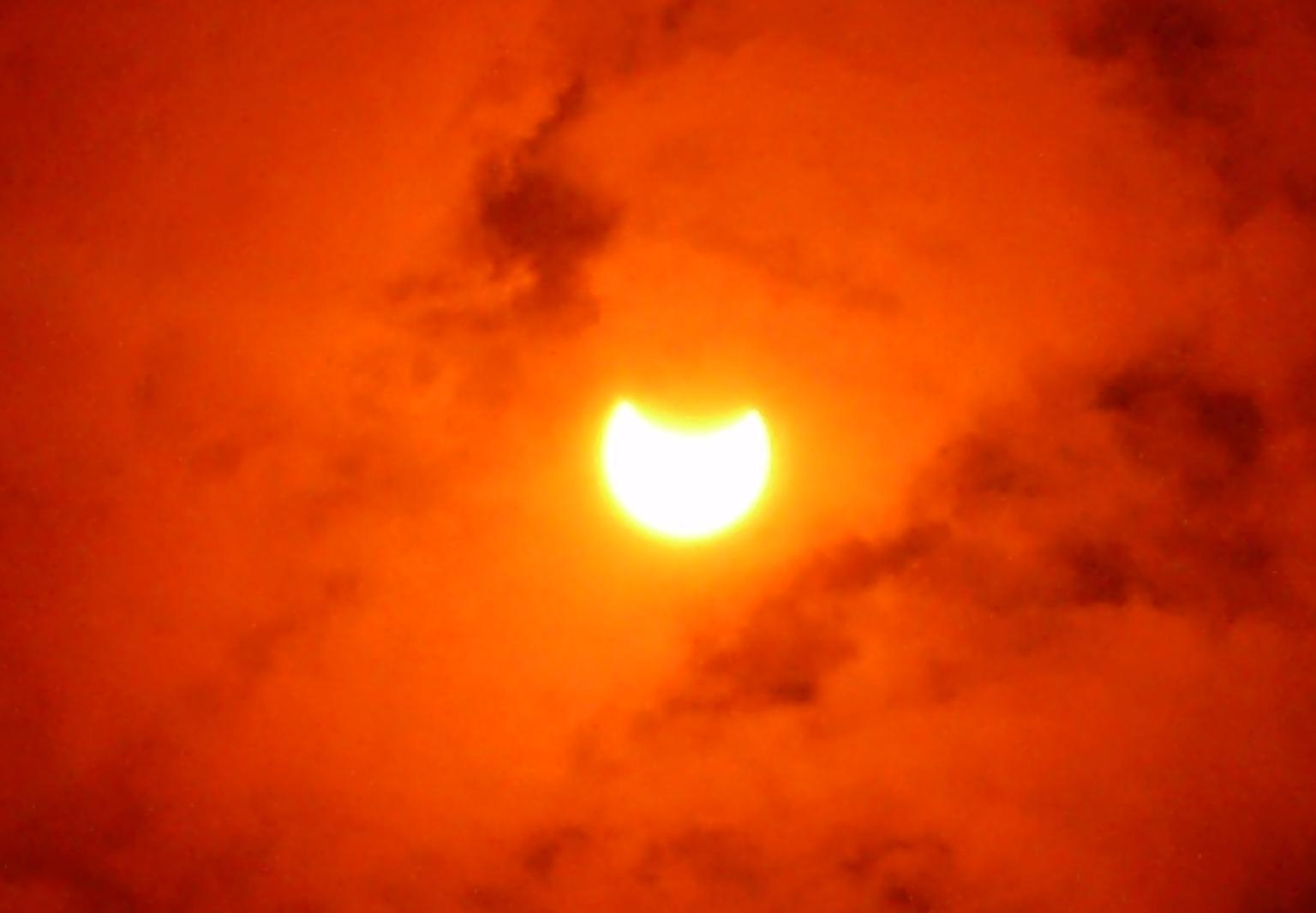
Partial from Pskov, Russia

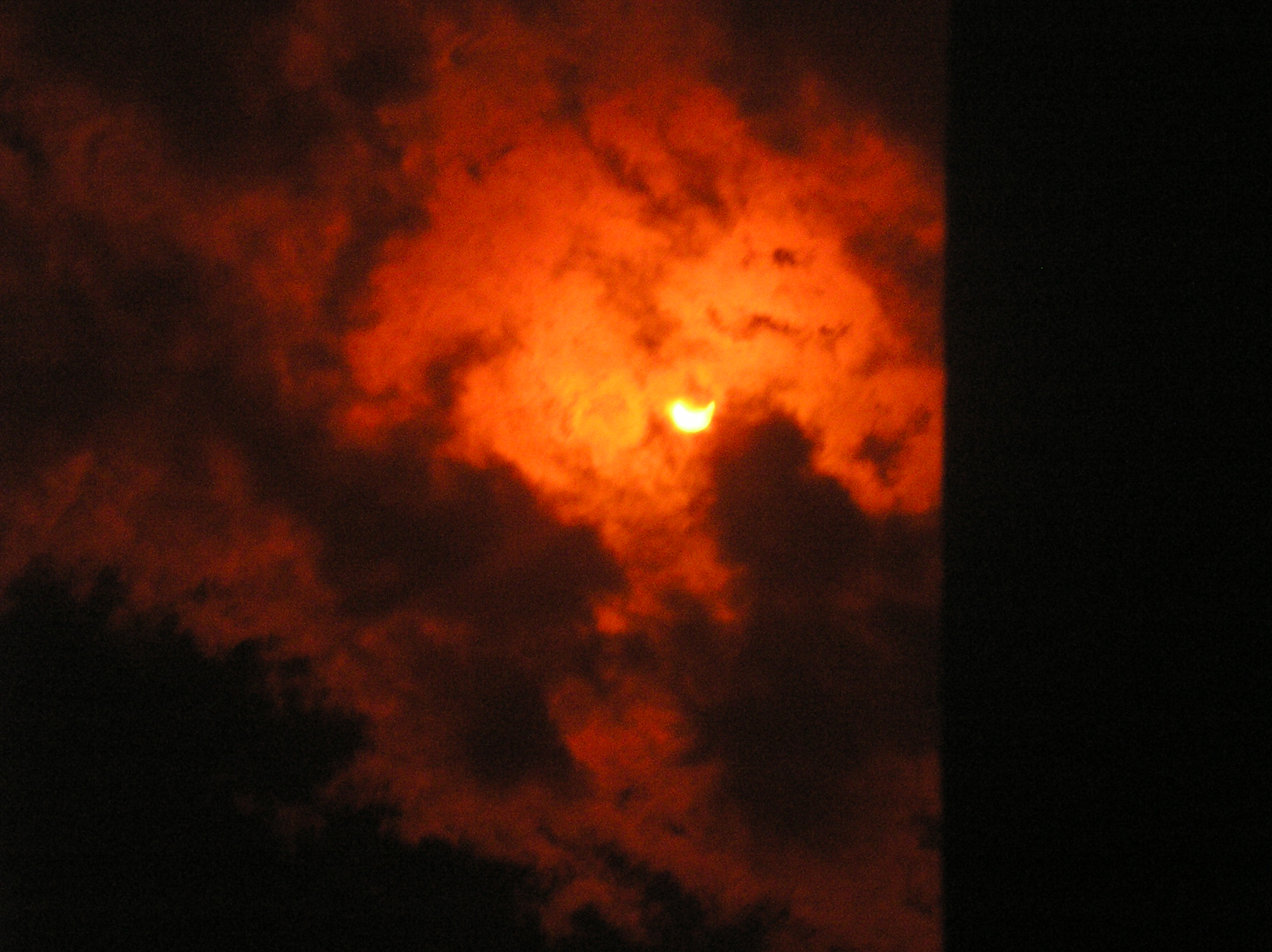
Partial from Saratov, Russia

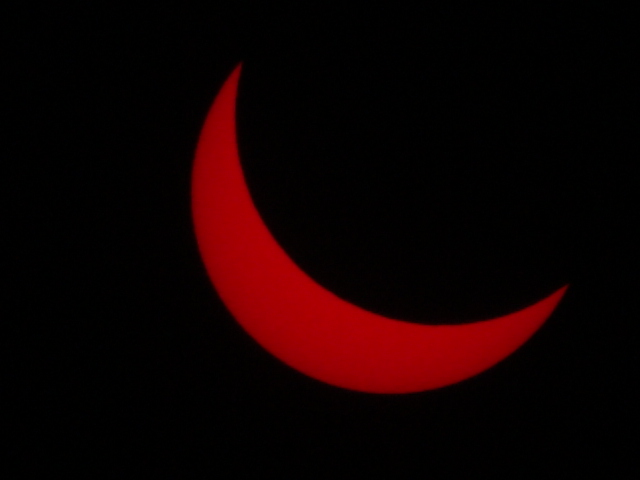
Partial from Yekaterinburg, Russia

== Conclusion: Mongolia and China ==
The path of the eclipse then moved south-east, crossing into Mongolia and just clipping Kazakhstan at around 10:58 UT. The path here was 252 km wide, but the duration decreased to 2 minutes 10 seconds. The path then ran down the China-Mongolia border, ending in China at 11:18 UT, with an eclipse lasting 1 minute 27 seconds at sunset. The total eclipse finished at 11:21 UT. The total eclipse passed over Altay City, Hami and Jiuquan. Around 10,000 people were gathered to watch the eclipse in Hami.

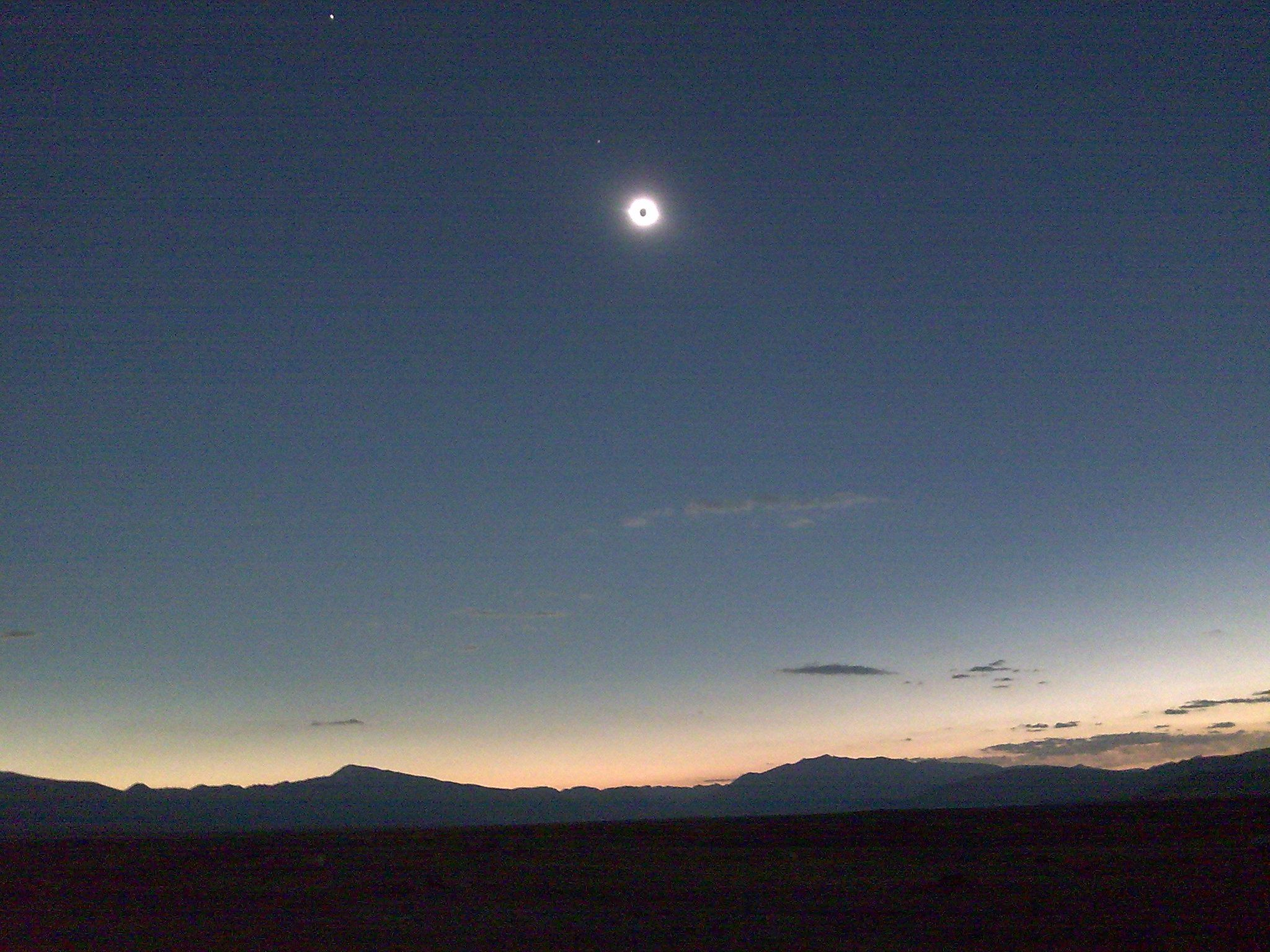
Totality in Altai City, Mongolia

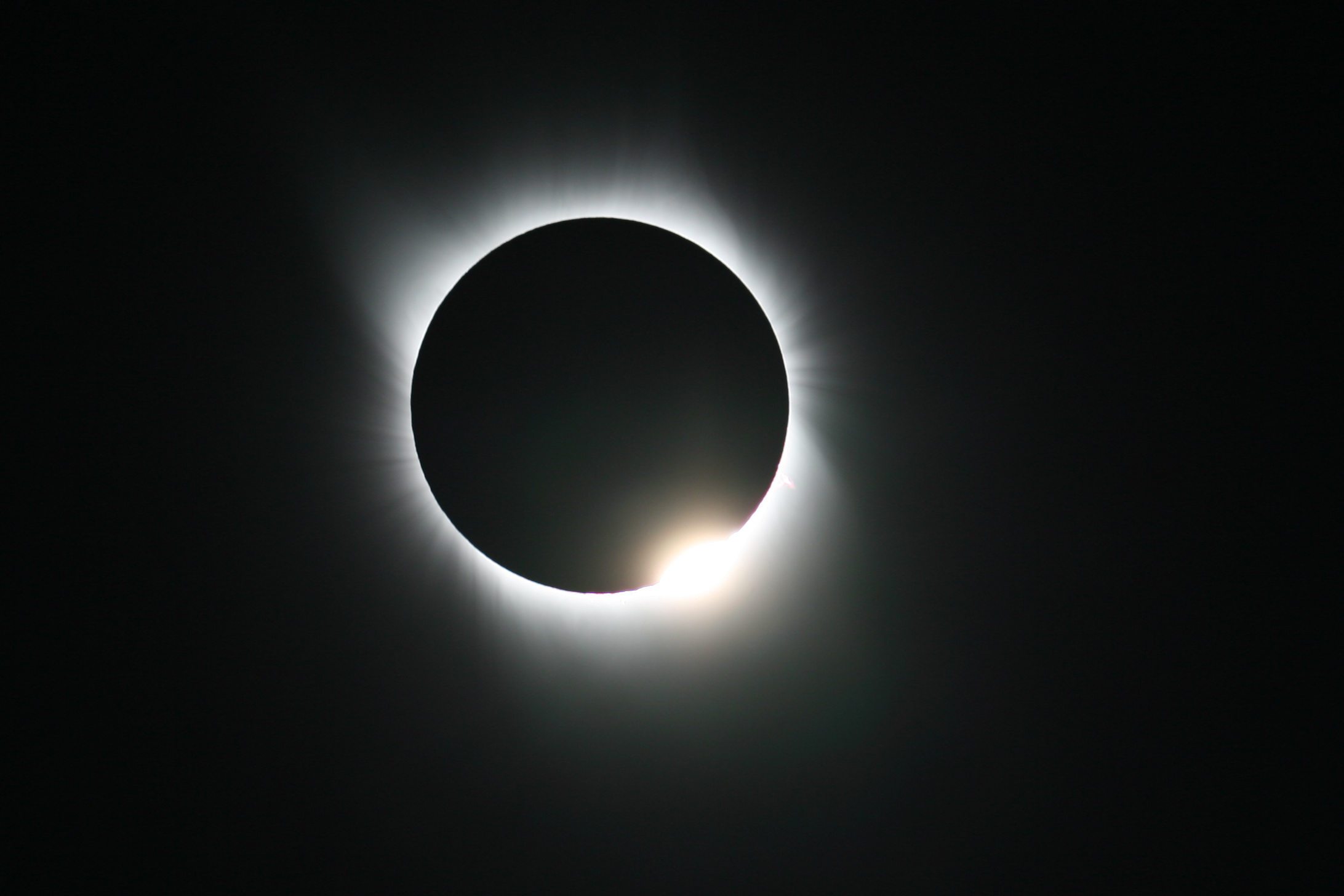
Diamond ring effect in Kumul, Xinjiang

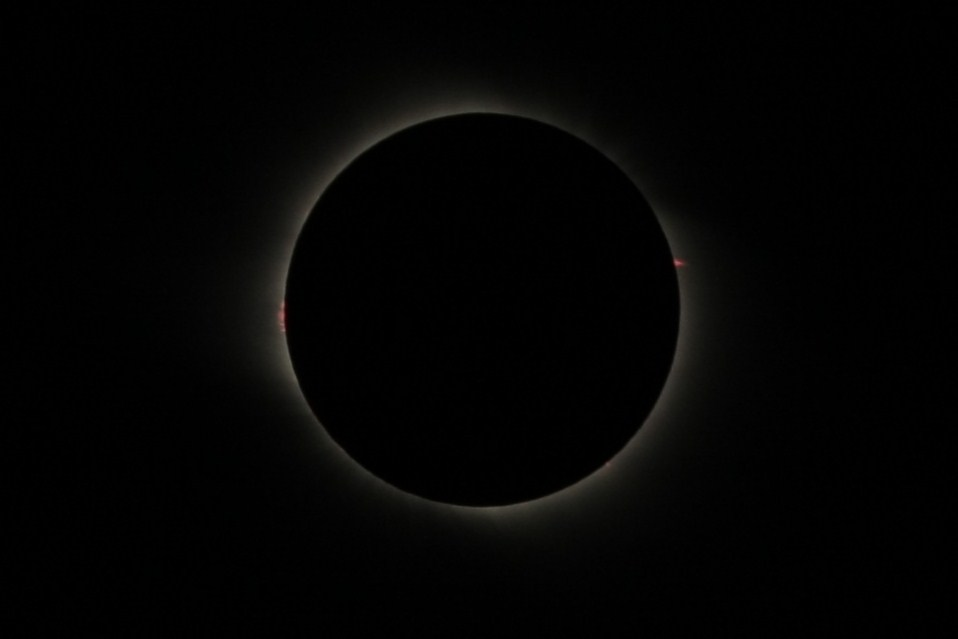
Totality in Jiuquan, China. Red prominences are visible on both sides of the Sun

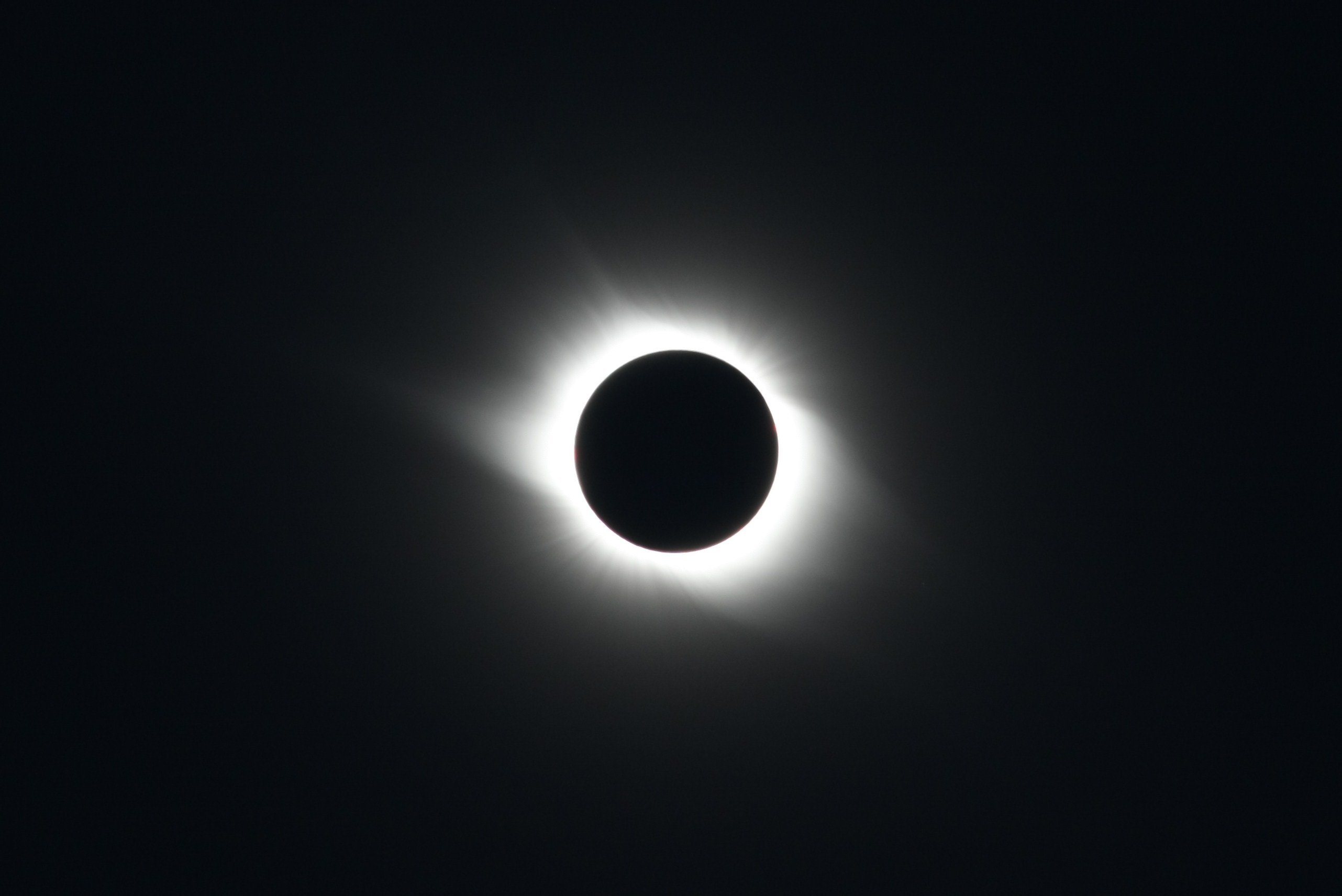
Totality in Jiuquan, China

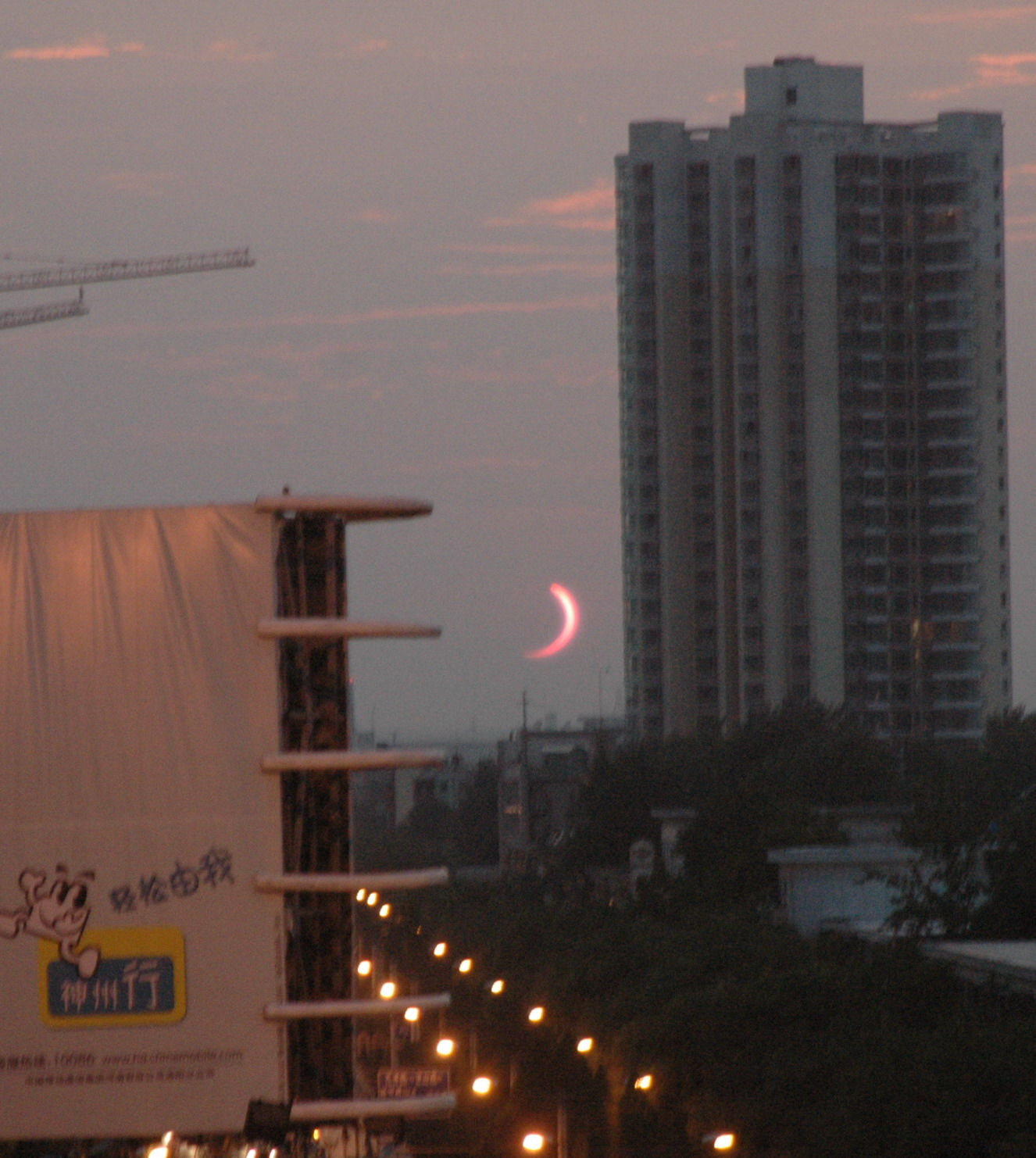
Partial from Zhengzhou, China

== Partial eclipse ==
A partial eclipse was seen from the much broader path of the Moon's penumbra, including the north east coast of North America and most of Europe and Asia. In London, England, the partial eclipse began at 09:33 BST, with a maximum eclipse of 12% at 10:18 BST, before concluding at 11:05 BST. At Edinburgh the partial eclipse was 23.5%, whilst it was 36% in Lerwick in the Shetland Isles.

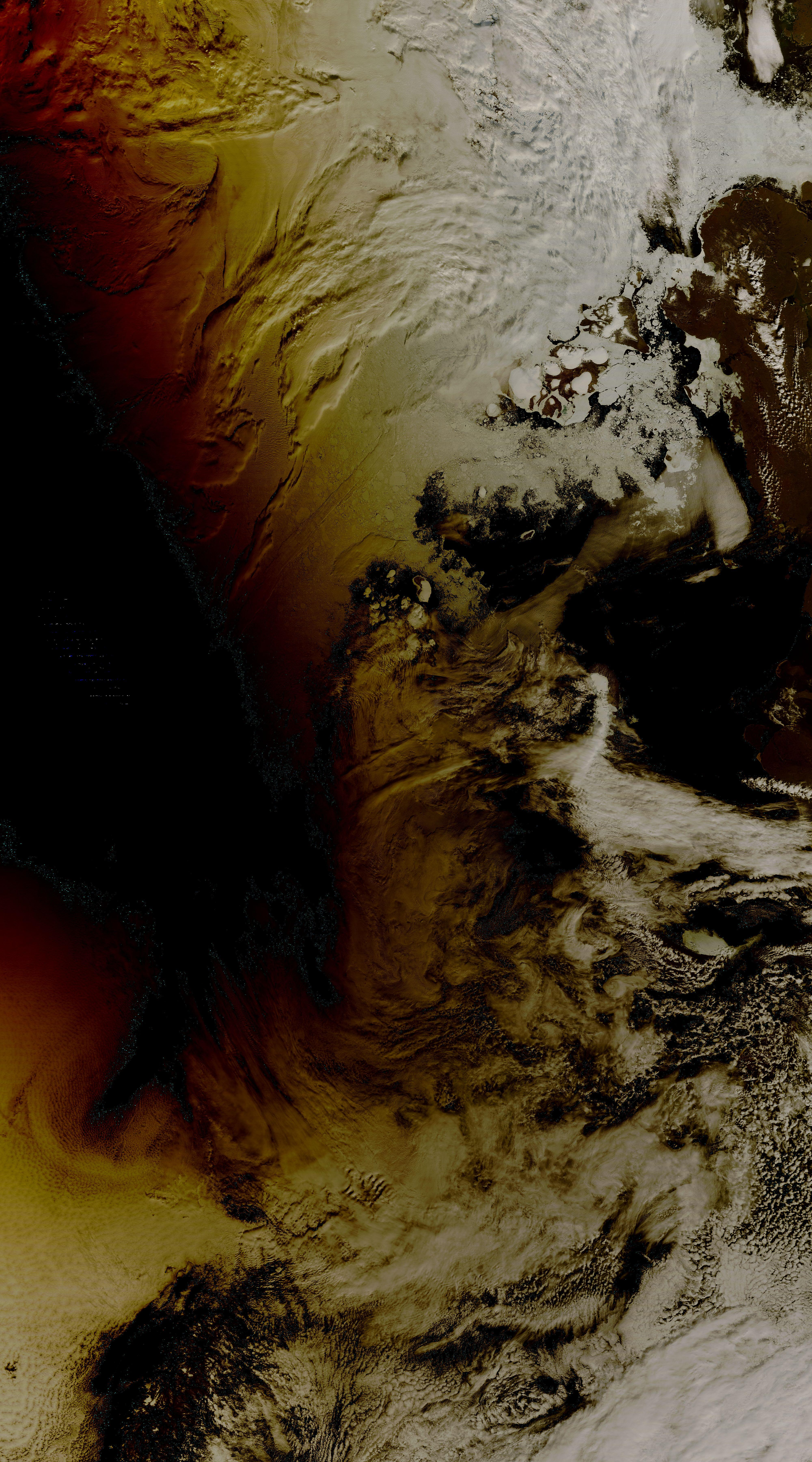
The eclipse over Russia, Norway, and the Arctic Ocean as seen from NASA's Terra satellite.

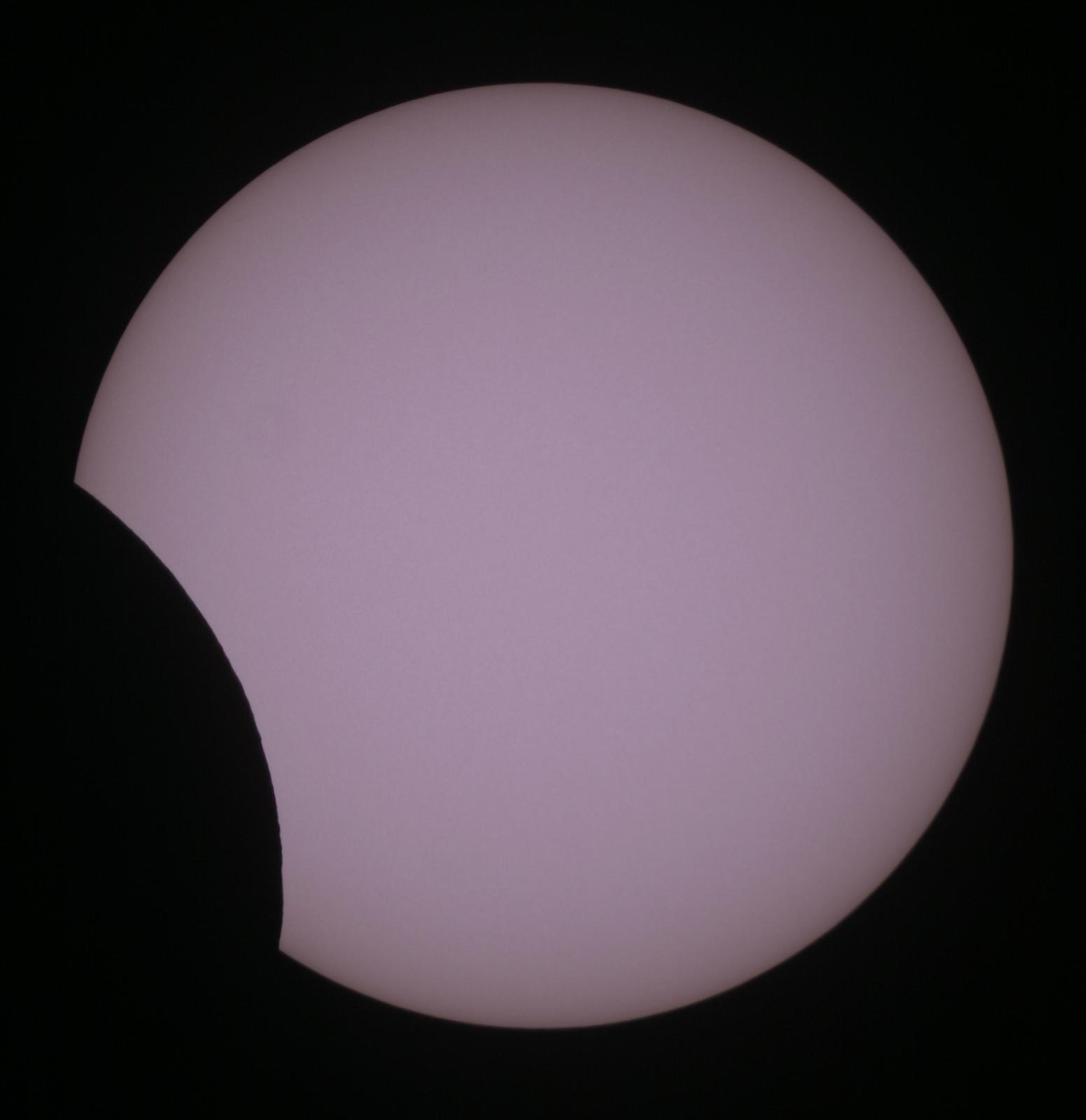
Partial from Graz, Austria

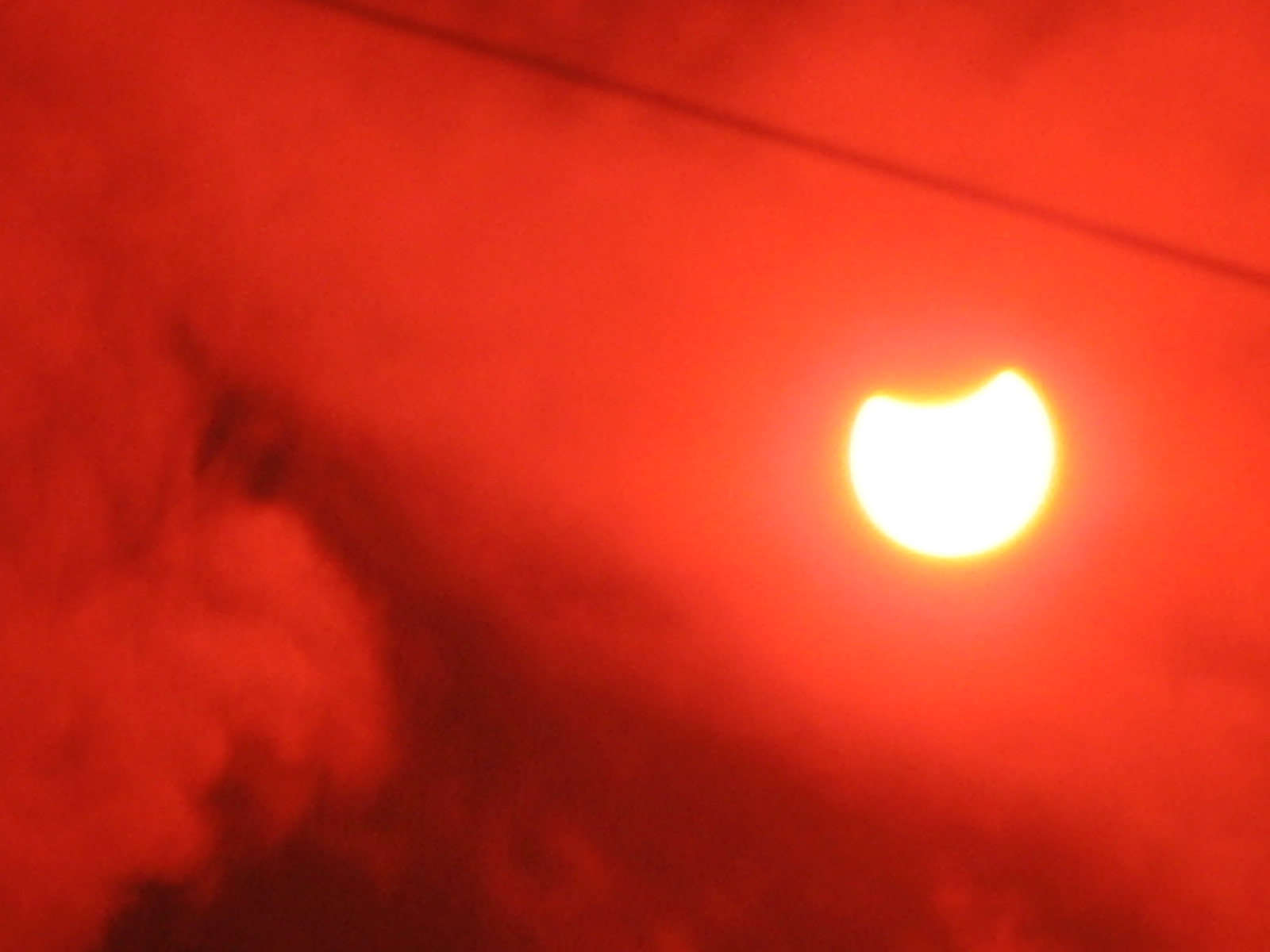
Partial from Minsk, Belarus

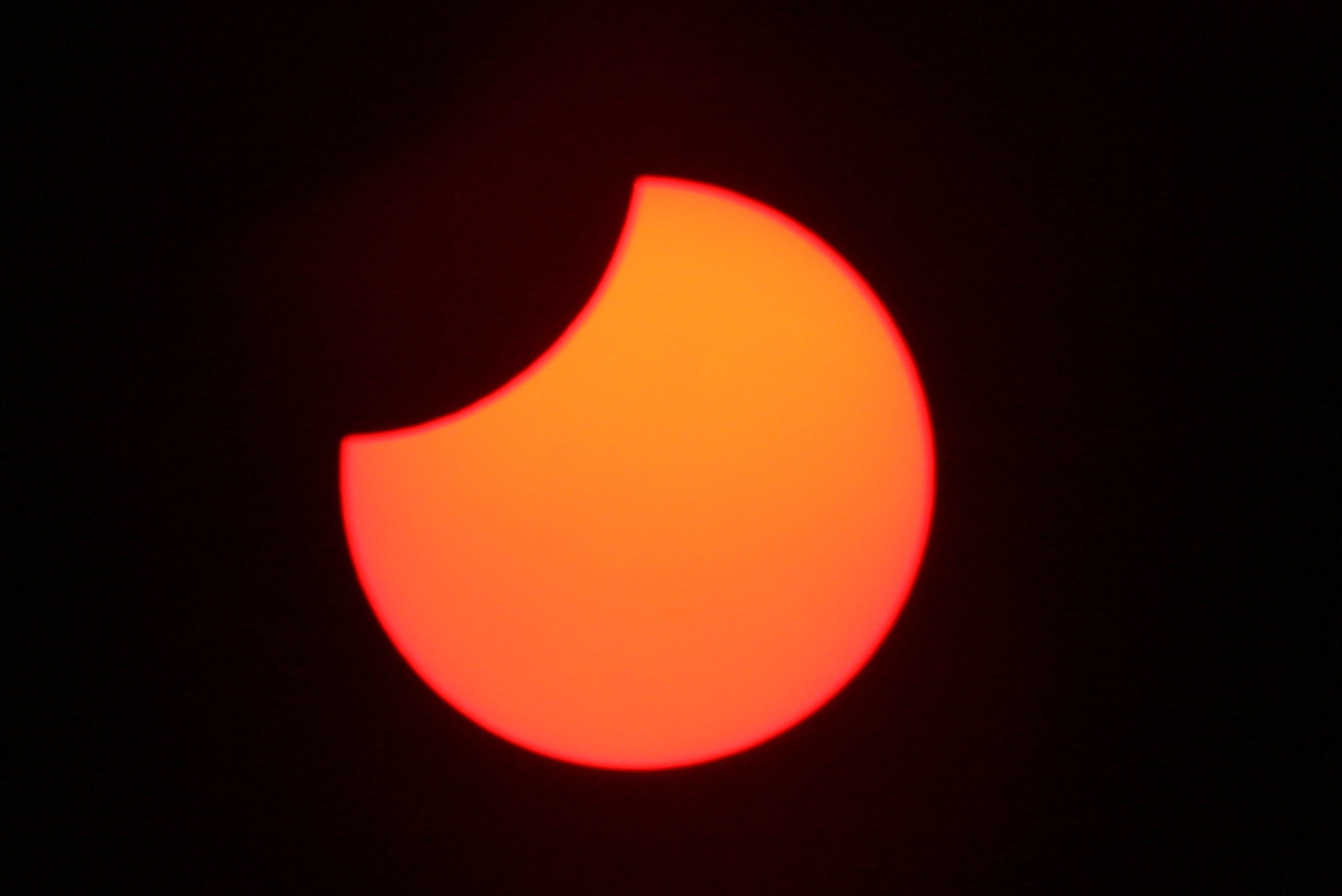
Partial from Jodrell Bank Observatory, England

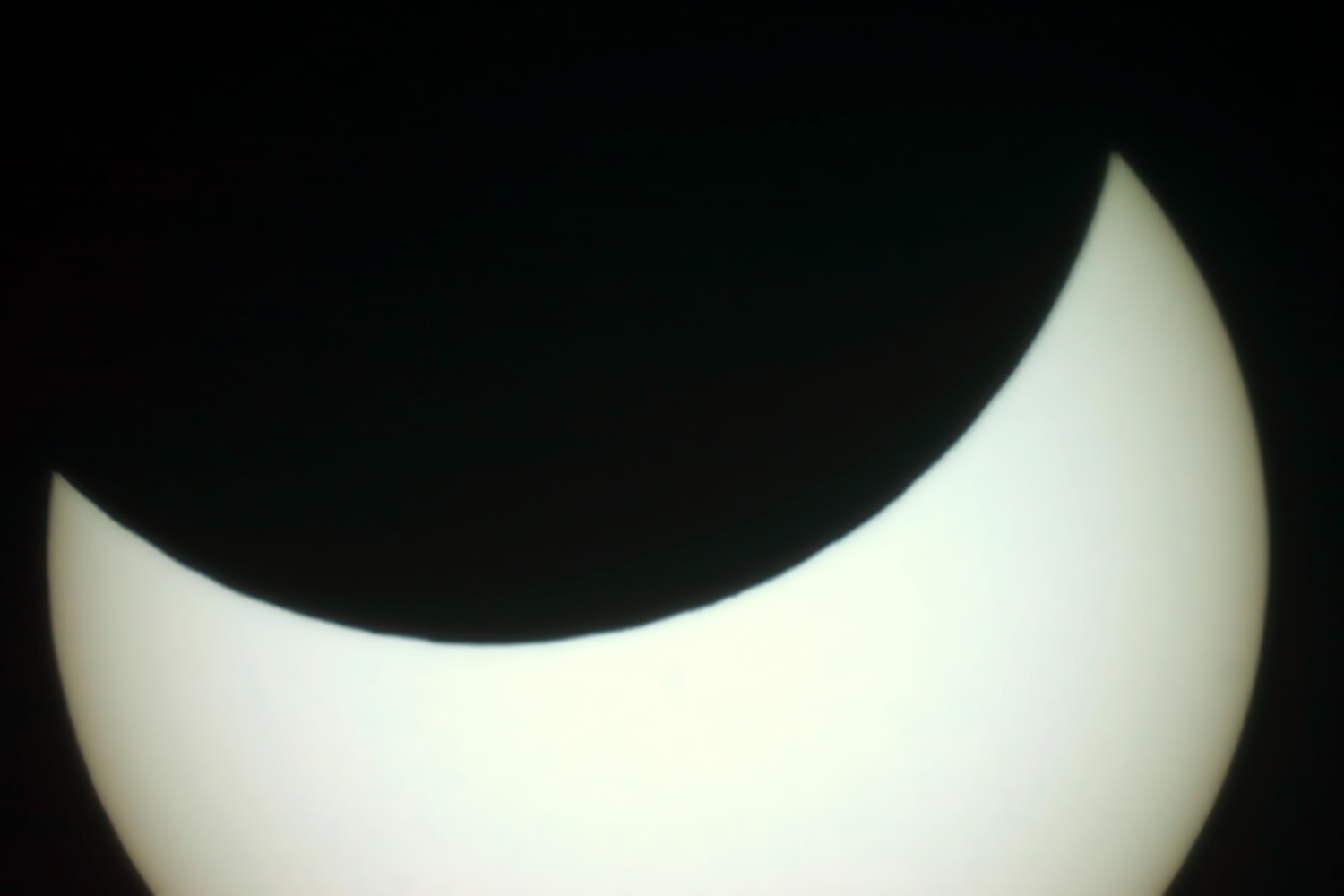
Partial from Huittinen, Finland

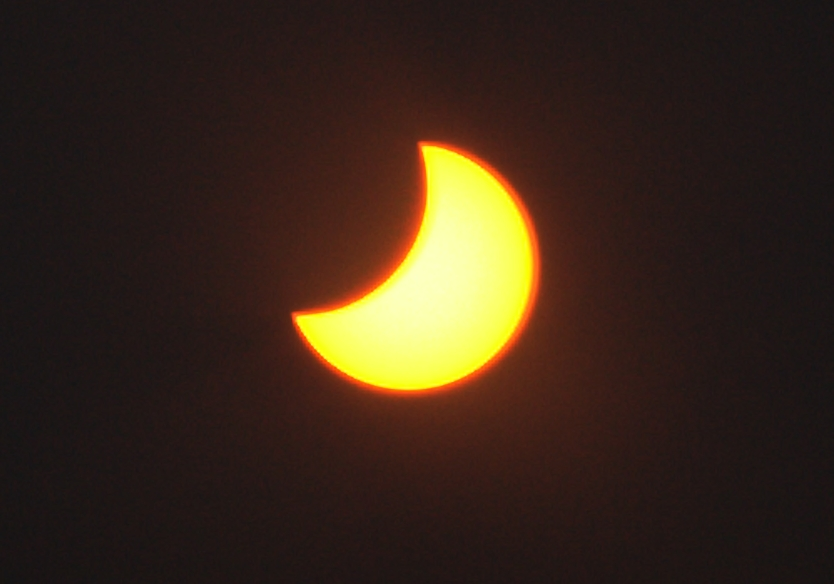
Partial from Bergen, Norway

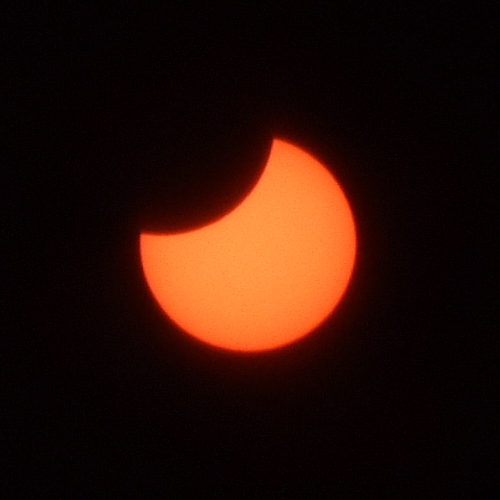
Warsaw, Poland at maximum phrase

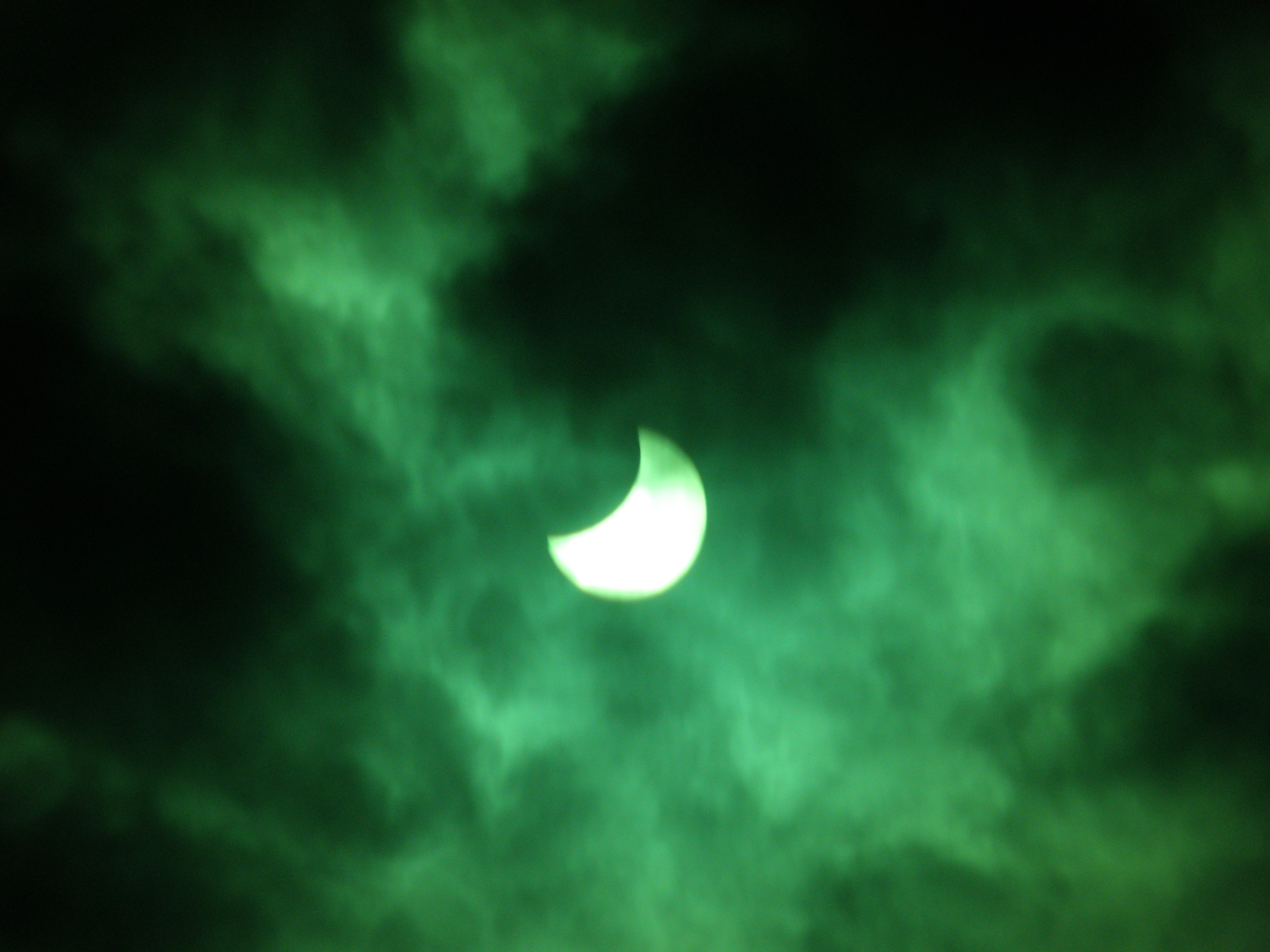
Partial from Kumla, Sweden

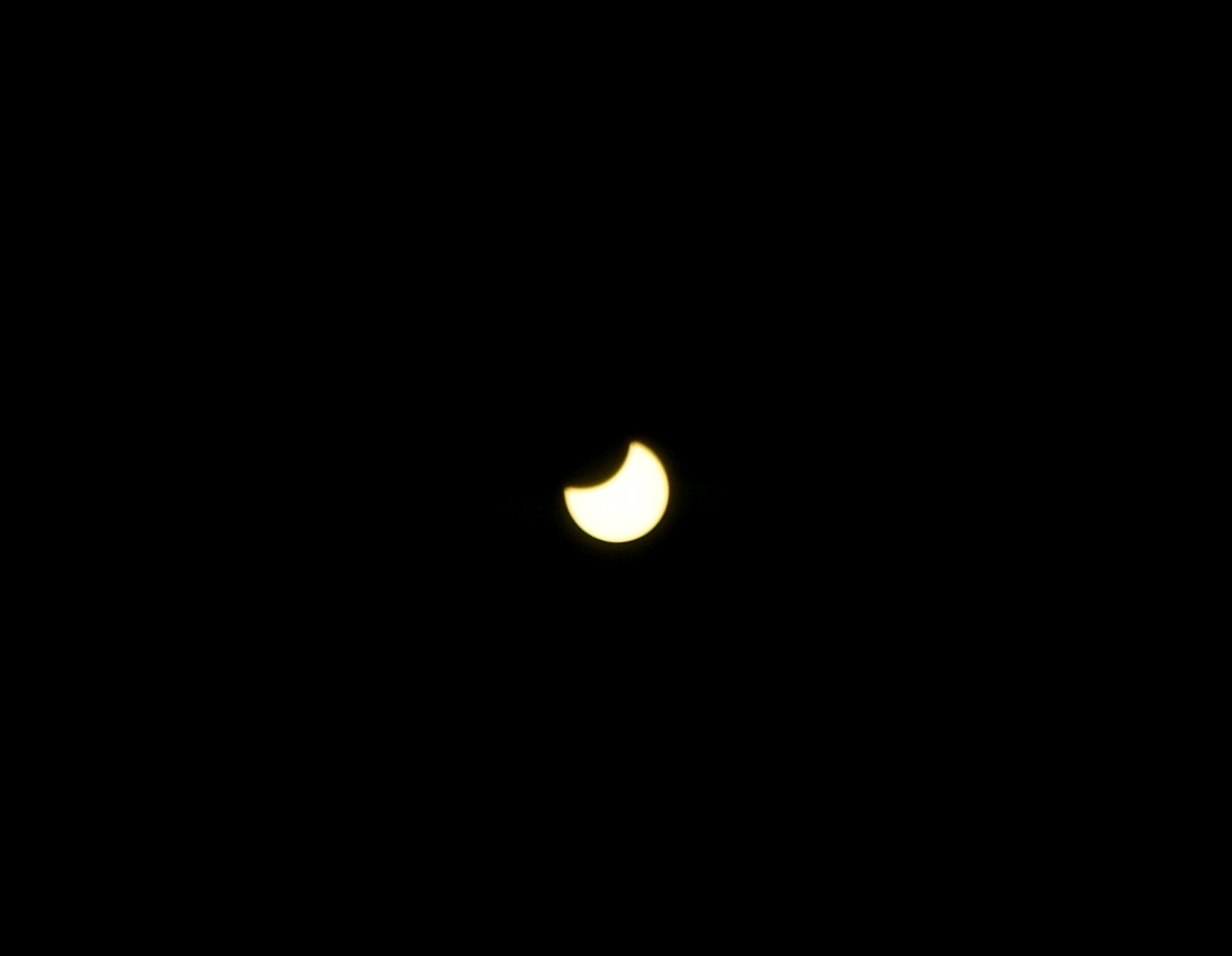
Partial from Makiivka, Ukraine

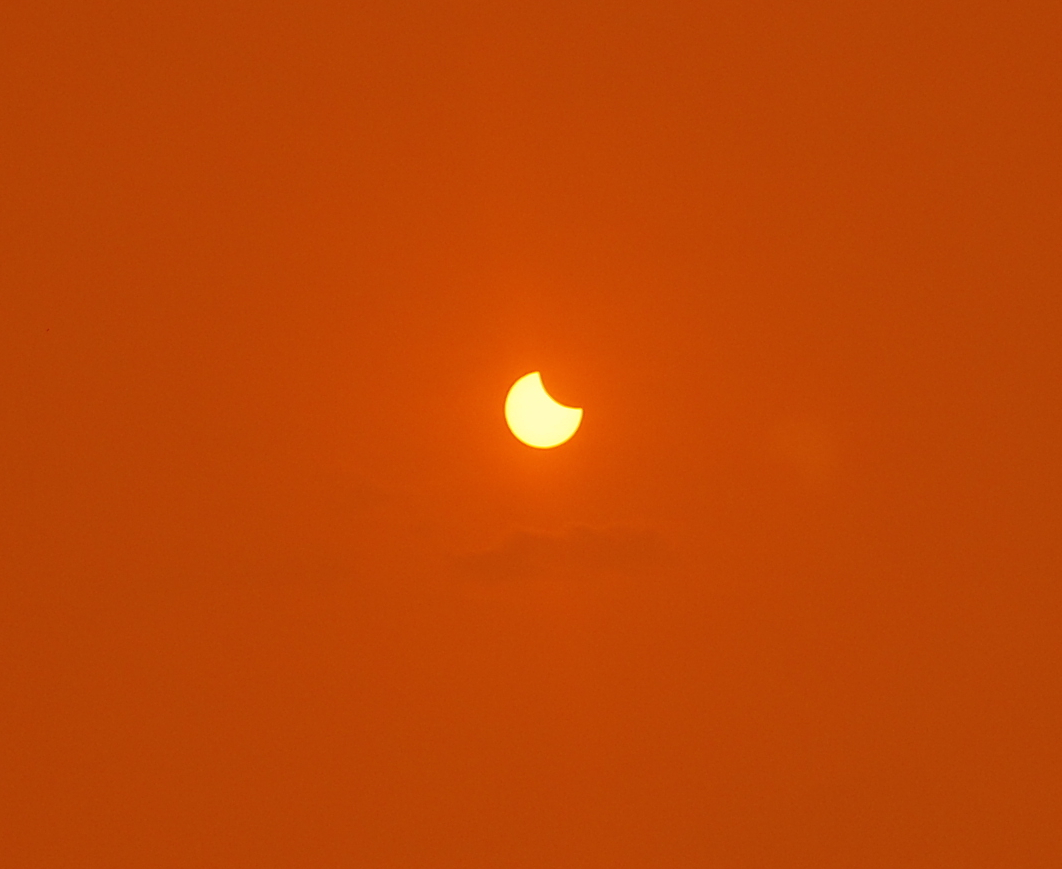
Partial from Chennai, India

== LTU 1111 ==
German charter airline LTU, now trading as Air Berlin, operated a special flight from Düsseldorf to the North Pole to observe the eclipse. Flight number LT 1111 spent over 11 hours in the air, returning to base at 6pm after flying a planeload of eclipse chasers, scientists, journalists and TV crews to watch the celestial event. The route also included a low-level sightseeing tour of Svalbard before the eclipse and the magnetic pole afterwards.

== Eclipse timing ==
=== Places experiencing total eclipse ===
Solar Eclipse of August 1, 2008 (Local Times)
Country or territory	City or place	Start of partial eclipse	Start of total eclipse	Maximum eclipse	End of total eclipse	End of partial eclipse	Duration of totality (min:s)	Duration of eclipse (hr:min)	Maximum magnitude
Canada	Grise Fiord	04:31:16	05:24:22	05:25:11	05:25:59	06:20:12	1:37	1:49	1.0104
Canada	Alert	04:36:14	05:32:09	05:32:32	05:32:55	06:29:37	0:46	1:53	1.0017
Russia	Nadym	15:16:48	16:20:18	16:21:32	16:22:46	17:23:37	2:28	2:07	1.0191
Russia	Noyabrsk	15:22:19	16:25:50	16:27:01	16:28:13	17:28:44	2:23	2:06	1.0157
Russia	Nizhnevartovsk	15:26:45	16:30:27	16:31:39	16:32:50	17:33:14	2:23	2:06	1.016
Russia	Novosibirsk	16:41:25	17:44:09	17:45:19	17:46:28	18:45:17	2:19	2:04	1.0166
Russia	Barnaul	16:45:06	17:47:40	17:48:49	17:49:56	18:48:27	2:16	2:03	1.0162
Russia	Gorno-Altaysk	16:49:00	17:50:58	17:52:04	17:53:10	18:51:01	2:12	2:02	1.015
Mongolia	Khovd	16:59:24	18:00:29	18:00:32	18:00:35	18:57:30	0:06	1:58	1.0003
China	Xinmi	18:25:55	19:18:31	19:18:52	19:19:13	19:28:21 (sunset)	0:42	1:02	1.002
China	Luoyang	18:25:53	19:18:32	19:19:07	19:19:40	19:32:25 (sunset)	1:08	1:07	1.0054
China	Xi'an	18:26:46	19:20:34	19:20:52	19:21:09	19:45:43 (sunset)	0:35	1:19	1.0015

=== Places experiencing partial eclipse ===
Solar Eclipse of August 1, 2008 (Local Times)
Country or territory	City or place	Start of partial eclipse	Maximum eclipse	End of partial eclipse	Duration of eclipse (hr:min)	Maximum coverage
Greenland	Nuuk	06:11:23	07:04:03	07:59:06	1:48	61.71%
Canada	Coral Harbour	03:41:11 (sunrise)	04:10:29	05:02:39	1:21	82.77%
Iceland	Reykjavík	08:14:46	09:10:47	10:09:22	1:55	49.33%
Canada	Pond Inlet	04:25:53	05:19:15	06:14:04	1:48	94.42%
Greenland	Pituffik	05:28:23	06:23:22	07:19:39	1:51	96.76%
Greenland	Qaanaaq	06:29:42	07:24:50	08:21:10	1:51	98.40%
Canada	Resolute	03:33:09	04:25:49	05:19:30	1:46	99.88%
Svalbard and Jan Mayen	Longyearbyen	10:39:24	11:41:09	12:43:18	2:04	92.73%
Sweden	Kiruna	10:38:12	11:42:56	12:48:07	2:10	67.10%
Finland	Rovaniemi	11:42:11	12:47:50	13:53:29	2:11	66.44%
Russia	Belushya Guba	12:57:16	14:02:12	15:05:52	2:09	95.25%
Russia	Moscow	13:02:04	14:09:26	15:14:56	2:13	48.66%
Russia	Omsk	16:35:01	17:41:27	18:43:48	2:09	92.76%
Kazakhstan	Astana	15:40:52	16:47:55	17:50:24	2:10	84.98%
Mongolia	Ulaanbaatar	18:04:06	19:00:19	19:53:15	1:49	86.74%
Kyrgyzstan	Bishkek	16:00:08	17:05:36	18:05:52	2:06	76.66%
Kazakhstan	Almaty	16:00:50	17:05:50	18:05:43	2:05	80.68%
Uzbekistan	Tashkent	15:00:00	16:06:00	17:06:39	2:07	65.78%
China	Beijing	18:17:20	19:10:09	19:27:59 (sunset)	1:11	90.21%
Tajikistan	Dushanbe	15:06:01	16:11:06	17:10:44	2:05	60.01%
Afghanistan	Kabul	14:46:03	15:49:08	16:46:48	2:01	52.99%
Pakistan	Islamabad	16:19:56	17:22:23	18:19:29	2:00	57.69%
India	New Delhi	16:03:27	17:02:41	17:56:54	1:53	53.80%
Vietnam	Hanoi	17:48:15	18:32:43	18:35:06 (sunset)	0:47	65.19%
Nepal	Kathmandu	16:22:14	17:20:03	18:13:09	1:51	63.27%
Bhutan	Thimphu	16:38:20	17:35:16	18:27:42	1:49	68.17%
Bangladesh	Dhaka	16:45:43	17:40:38	18:31:18	1:46	60.57%
Laos	Vientiane	17:54:14	18:41:11	18:43:31 (sunset)	0:49	57.71%
Thailand	Bangkok	18:02:20	18:43:01	18:45:58 (sunset)	0:44	43.22%
Myanmar	Yangon	17:28:07	18:18:03	18:37:38 (sunset)	1:10	49.59%

== Eclipse details ==
Shown below are two tables displaying details about this particular solar eclipse. The first table outlines times at which the Moon's penumbra or umbra attains the specific parameter, and the second table describes various other parameters pertaining to this eclipse.

August 1, 2008 Solar Eclipse Times
Event	Time (UTC)
First Penumbral External Contact	2008 August 1 at 08:05:11.5 UTC
First Umbral External Contact	2008 August 1 at 09:22:12.6 UTC
First Central Line	2008 August 1 at 09:23:43.3 UTC
First Umbral Internal Contact	2008 August 1 at 09:25:15.6 UTC
Equatorial Conjunction	2008 August 1 at 09:48:26.9 UTC
Ecliptic Conjunction	2008 August 1 at 10:13:39.0 UTC
Greatest Duration	2008 August 1 at 10:20:17.1 UTC
Greatest Eclipse	2008 August 1 at 10:22:12.3 UTC
Last Umbral Internal Contact	2008 August 1 at 11:19:33.2 UTC
Last Central Line	2008 August 1 at 11:21:03.1 UTC
Last Umbral External Contact	2008 August 1 at 11:22:31.3 UTC
Last Penumbral External Contact	2008 August 1 at 12:39:31.7 UTC

August 1, 2008 Solar Eclipse Parameters
Parameter	Value
Eclipse Magnitude	1.03942
Eclipse Obscuration	1.08040
Gamma	0.83070
Sun Right Ascension	08h47m54.1s
Sun Declination	+17°51'56.4"
Sun Semi-Diameter	15'45.5"
Sun Equatorial Horizontal Parallax	08.7"
Moon Right Ascension	08h49m08.8s
Moon Declination	+18°38'01.6"
Moon Semi-Diameter	16'14.1"
Moon Equatorial Horizontal Parallax	0°59'34.8"
ΔT	65.6 s

== Eclipse season ==
This eclipse is part of an eclipse season, a period, roughly every six months, when eclipses occur. Only two (or occasionally three) eclipse seasons occur each year, and each season lasts about 35 days and repeats just short of six months (173 days) later; thus two full eclipse seasons always occur each year. Either two or three eclipses happen each eclipse season. In the sequence below, each eclipse is separated by a fortnight.

Eclipse season of August 2008
August 1 Descending node (new moon)	August 16 Ascending node (full moon)
Total solar eclipse Solar Saros 126	Partial lunar eclipse Lunar Saros 138

== Related eclipses ==
=== Eclipses in 2008 ===
- An annular solar eclipse on February 7.
- A total lunar eclipse on February 21.
- A total solar eclipse on August 1.
- A partial lunar eclipse on August 16.

=== Metonic ===
- Preceded by: Solar eclipse of October 14, 2004
- Followed by: Solar eclipse of May 20, 2012

=== Tzolkinex ===
- Preceded by: Solar eclipse of June 21, 2001
- Followed by: Solar eclipse of September 13, 2015

=== Half-Saros ===
- Preceded by: Lunar eclipse of July 28, 1999
- Followed by: Lunar eclipse of August 7, 2017

=== Tritos ===
- Preceded by: Solar eclipse of September 2, 1997
- Followed by: Solar eclipse of July 2, 2019

=== Solar Saros 126 ===
- Preceded by: Solar eclipse of July 22, 1990
- Followed by: Solar eclipse of August 12, 2026

=== Inex ===
- Preceded by: Solar eclipse of August 22, 1979
- Followed by: Solar eclipse of July 13, 2037

=== Triad ===
- Preceded by: Solar eclipse of October 1, 1921
- Followed by: Solar eclipse of June 2, 2095

=== Solar eclipses of 2008–2011 ===
This eclipse is a member of a semester series. An eclipse in a semester series of solar eclipses repeats approximately every 177 days and 4 hours (a semester) at alternating nodes of the Moon's orbit.

The partial solar eclipses on June 1, 2011 and November 25, 2011 occur in the next lunar year eclipse set.

Solar eclipse series sets from 2008 to 2011
Ascending node			Descending node		
Saros	Map	Gamma	Saros	Map	Gamma
121 Partial in Christchurch, New Zealand	February 7, 2008 Annular	−0.95701	126 Totality in Kumul, Xinjiang, China	August 1, 2008 Total	0.83070
131 Annularity in Palangka Raya, Indonesia	January 26, 2009 Annular	−0.28197	136 Totality in Kurigram District, Bangladesh	July 22, 2009 Total	0.06977
141 Annularity in Jinan, Shandong, China	January 15, 2010 Annular	0.40016	146 Totality in Hao, French Polynesia	July 11, 2010 Total	−0.67877
151 Partial in Poland	January 4, 2011 Partial	1.06265	156	July 1, 2011 Partial	−1.49171

=== Saros 126 ===
This eclipse is a part of Saros series 126, repeating every 18 years, 11 days, and containing 72 events. The series started with a partial solar eclipse on March 10, 1179. It contains annular eclipses from June 4, 1323 through April 4, 1810; hybrid eclipses from April 14, 1828 through May 6, 1864; and total eclipses from May 17, 1882 through August 23, 2044. The series ends at member 72 as a partial eclipse on May 3, 2459. Its eclipses are tabulated in three columns; every third eclipse in the same column is one exeligmos apart, so they all cast shadows over approximately the same parts of the Earth.

The longest duration of annularity was produced by member 11 at 6 minutes, 30 seconds on June 26, 1359, and the longest duration of totality was produced by member 45 at 2 minutes, 36 seconds on July 10, 1972. All eclipses in this series occur at the Moon’s descending node of orbit.

Series members 36–57 occur between 1801 and 2200:
36	37	38
April 4, 1810	April 14, 1828	April 25, 1846
39	40	41
May 6, 1864	May 17, 1882	May 28, 1900
42	43	44
June 8, 1918	June 19, 1936	June 30, 1954
45	46	47
July 10, 1972	July 22, 1990	August 1, 2008
48	49	50
August 12, 2026	August 23, 2044	September 3, 2062
51	52	53
September 13, 2080	September 25, 2098	October 6, 2116
54	55	56
October 17, 2134	October 28, 2152	November 8, 2170
57
November 18, 2188

=== Metonic series ===
The metonic series repeats eclipses every 19 years (6939.69 days), lasting about 5 cycles. Eclipses occur in nearly the same calendar date. In addition, the octon subseries repeats 1/5 of that or every 3.8 years (1387.94 days). All eclipses in this table occur at the Moon's descending node.

21 eclipse events between May 21, 1993 and May 20, 2069
May 20–21	March 9	December 25–26	October 13–14	August 1–2
118	120	122	124	126
May 21, 1993	March 9, 1997	December 25, 2000	October 14, 2004	August 1, 2008
128	130	132	134	136
May 20, 2012	March 9, 2016	December 26, 2019	October 14, 2023	August 2, 2027
138	140	142	144	146
May 21, 2031	March 9, 2035	December 26, 2038	October 14, 2042	August 2, 2046
148	150	152	154	156
May 20, 2050	March 9, 2054	December 26, 2057	October 13, 2061	August 2, 2065
158
May 20, 2069

=== Tritos series ===
This eclipse is a part of a tritos cycle, repeating at alternating nodes every 135 synodic months (≈ 3986.63 days, or 11 years minus 1 month). Their appearance and longitude are irregular due to a lack of synchronization with the anomalistic month (period of perigee), but groupings of 3 tritos cycles (≈ 33 years minus 3 months) come close (≈ 434.044 anomalistic months), so eclipses are similar in these groupings.

Series members between 1801 and 2200
March 14, 1801 (Saros 107)	February 12, 1812 (Saros 108)	January 12, 1823 (Saros 109)		November 10, 1844 (Saros 111)
		August 9, 1877 (Saros 114)	July 9, 1888 (Saros 115)	June 8, 1899 (Saros 116)
May 9, 1910 (Saros 117)	April 8, 1921 (Saros 118)	March 7, 1932 (Saros 119)	February 4, 1943 (Saros 120)	January 5, 1954 (Saros 121)
December 4, 1964 (Saros 122)	November 3, 1975 (Saros 123)	October 3, 1986 (Saros 124)	September 2, 1997 (Saros 125)	August 1, 2008 (Saros 126)
July 2, 2019 (Saros 127)	June 1, 2030 (Saros 128)	April 30, 2041 (Saros 129)	March 30, 2052 (Saros 130)	February 28, 2063 (Saros 131)
January 27, 2074 (Saros 132)	December 27, 2084 (Saros 133)	November 27, 2095 (Saros 134)	October 26, 2106 (Saros 135)	September 26, 2117 (Saros 136)
August 25, 2128 (Saros 137)	July 25, 2139 (Saros 138)	June 25, 2150 (Saros 139)	May 25, 2161 (Saros 140)	April 23, 2172 (Saros 141)
March 23, 2183 (Saros 142)	February 21, 2194 (Saros 143)			

=== Inex series ===
This eclipse is a part of the long period inex cycle, repeating at alternating nodes, every 358 synodic months (≈ 10,571.95 days, or 29 years minus 20 days). Their appearance and longitude are irregular due to a lack of synchronization with the anomalistic month (period of perigee). However, groupings of 3 inex cycles (≈ 87 years minus 2 months) comes close (≈ 1,151.02 anomalistic months), so eclipses are similar in these groupings.

Series members between 1801 and 2200
December 21, 1805 (Saros 119)	November 30, 1834 (Saros 120)	November 11, 1863 (Saros 121)
October 20, 1892 (Saros 122)	October 1, 1921 (Saros 123)	September 12, 1950 (Saros 124)
August 22, 1979 (Saros 125)	August 1, 2008 (Saros 126)	July 13, 2037 (Saros 127)
June 22, 2066 (Saros 128)	June 2, 2095 (Saros 129)	May 14, 2124 (Saros 130)
April 23, 2153 (Saros 131)	April 3, 2182 (Saros 132)	
