= Nadym (river) =

River in Yamalia, Russia

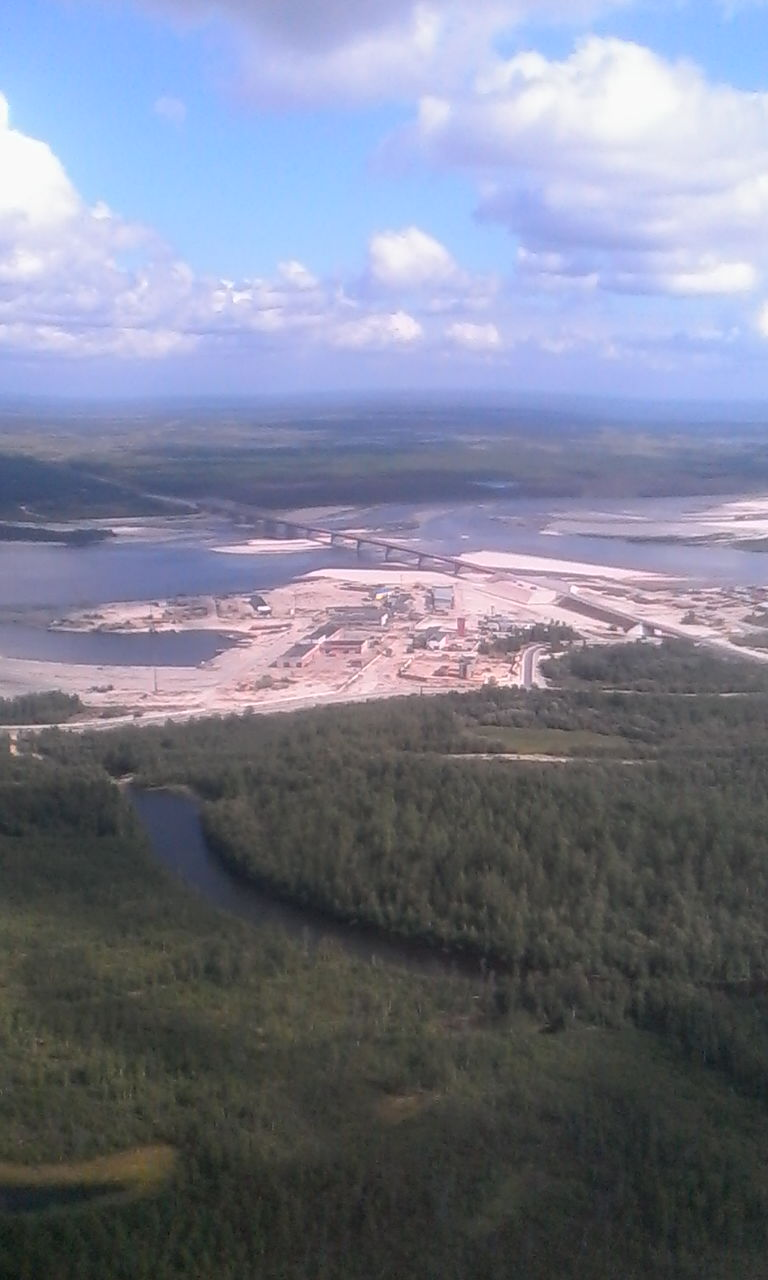

Location
- Country: Russia

Physical characteristics
- Source: Numto
- Mouth: Gulf of Ob
  - coordinates: 66.1833°N 72.0167°E
- Length: 545 km (339 mi)
- Basin size: 64,000 km^{2} (25,000 sq mi)

The Nadym (Russian: Нады́м) is a river in Yamalo-Nenets Autonomous Okrug, Russia. The length of the Nadym is 545 kilometers (339 mi). The area of its basin is 64,000 square kilometers (25,000 sq mi).

It is known for having a very rickety pontoon bridge for summer use while winter roads go over the ice. A new fixed bridge for combined road and rail use is to be finished by the end of 2015.

== Course ==
The river originates in Lake Numto, in the Siberian Uvaly and flows into the Kara Sea through the Gulf of Ob. Its mouth is very near to the mouth of the Ob. It freezes up in October and stays under the ice until late May. The Levaya Khetta is one of the biggest tributaries of the Nadym. The town of Nadym is located on the river Nadym.

== See also ==
- Nadym fortified settlement
