= Nadym fortified settlement =

Archeological site in Yamalo-Nenets Autonomous Okrug, Russia

Coordinates: 65°56′59″N 71°34′42″E

The Nadym fortified settlement or Nadym hillfort (Russian: Надымское городище) is an archeological site in Yamalo-Nenets Autonomous Okrug, Russia located about 60 km north-north-west of Nadym and about 32 km off the mouth of the Nadym River. It is an ancient fortified settlement on an island elevated up to 1m above the floodplain surrounded by channels and floodplain lakes. Its area it 1,200sq.m. The mound of the settlement was artificially elevated with humus, crushed stone, brushwood, planks, and logs. Its rich cultural layers were well preserved in permafrost.

== History of discovery ==
According to the manuscripts published in Mezen Chronographer (Мезенский хронограф, 2024), the Nadym hillfort was first mentioned in the 16-century. A detailed description of the hillfort was given in the travelogue of Gerhard Friedrich Müller. The first archeological description of the site was given by a teacher and local lore researcher Grigory Dmitriev-Sadovnikov (Григорий Матвеевич Дмитриев-Садовников), in 1916, who did some archeological work in cooperation with the Tobolsk Governorate museum and assembled an archeological collection. In particular, he retrieved a fragment of a head of wooden statue, as he described, "The shaitan carved in the middle of a split log".

More recently, in 1976, professor Leonid Khlobystin inspected the mouth of Nadym, including the Nadym hillfort, and also collected archeological artifacts.

Major excavations were carried out in 1998–2005 by an expedition led by Oleg Kardash (Олег Викторович Кардаш). The anthropological finds are stored at the museum of the Institute of Plant and Animal Ecology Ural Branch of the Russian Academy of Sciences, Yekaterinburg.

== Description ==
Dendrochronology dates the earliest buildings by 1337—1343. Historical records indicate that it was abandoned after major catastrophic events in 1730.
