= Levaya Khetta =

Location
- Country: Russia

Physical characteristics
- Source
  - coordinates: 63.8828°N 71.0875°E
- Mouth: Nadym
  - coordinates: 65.2703°N 73.2838°E
- Length: 357 km (222 mi)
- Basin size: 11,300 km^{2} (4,400 sq mi)

Basin features
- Progression: Nadym→ Gulf of Ob

The Levaya Khetta (Russian: Левая Хетта) is a river in Yamalo-Nenets Autonomous Okrug of Tyumen Oblast, Russia. It is a left tributary of the Nadym. The length of the Levaya Khetta is 357 kilometers (222 mi). The area of its basin is 11,300 square kilometers (4,400 sq mi).
