= Nadym =

Nadym Надым
- Town
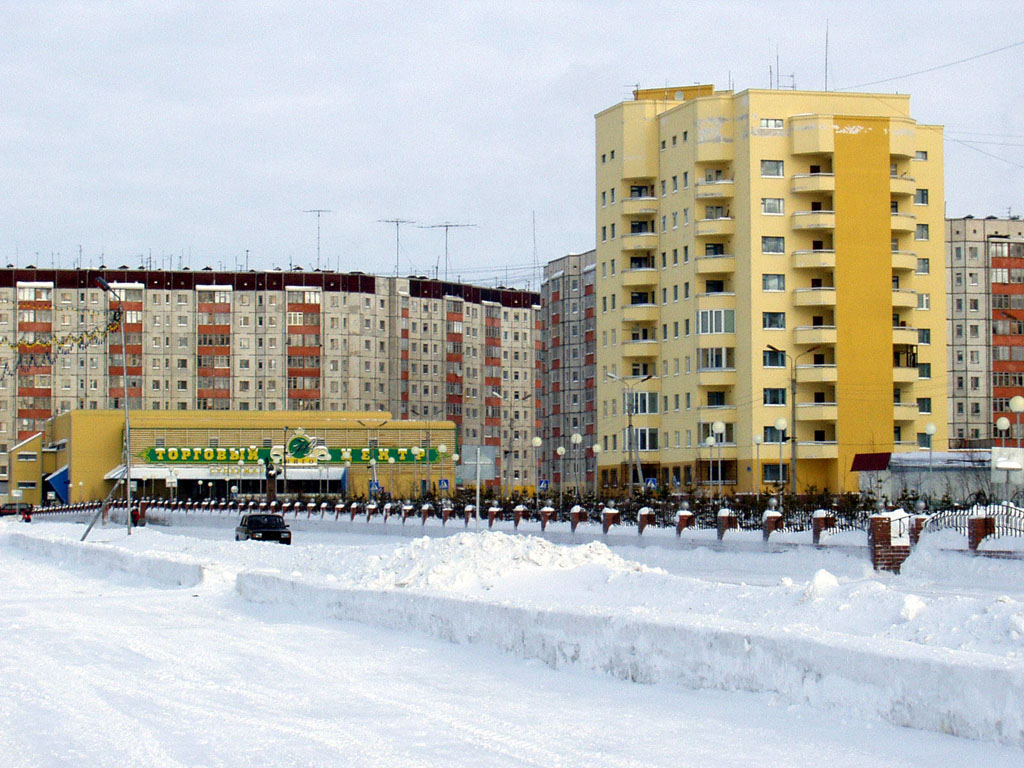
- In Nadym

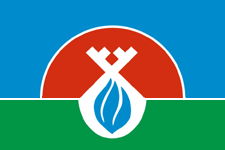
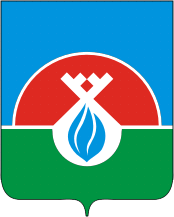
- Flag Coat of arms
- Interactive map of Nadym
- Location of Nadym Nadym (Yamalo-Nenets Autonomous Okrug)
- Coordinates: 65°32′N 72°31′E
- Country: Russia
- Federal subject: Yamalo-Nenets Autonomous Okrug
- Established: 1598 (first mentioned), 1968 (re-established)
- Town status since: March 9, 1972

Government
  - Mayor: Dmitriy Zharomskikh
- Elevation: 6 m (20 ft)

Population (2010 Census)
  - Total: 46,611
  - Estimate (2025): 44,046 (−5.5%)

Administrative status
  - Subordinated to: town of okrug significance of Nadym
  - Capital of: Nadymsky District, town of okrug significance of Nadym

Municipal status
  - Municipal district: Nadymsky Municipal District
  - Urban settlement: Nadym Urban Settlement
  - Capital of: Nadymsky Municipal District, Nadym Urban Settlement
- Time zone: UTC+5 (MSK+2)
- Postal code: 629730
- Dialing code: +7 3499
- OKTMO ID: 71936000001
- Website: www.gorod-nadym.ru

Nadym (Russian: Нады́м) is a town in Yamalo-Nenets Autonomous Okrug, Russia, located on the river Nadym. The population has fluctuated over time: 46,611 (2010 census); 45,943 (2002 census); 52,586 (1989 Soviet census).

== History ==
The first mention of the city's name appears at the end of the 16th century. The name "Nadym" appears on Russian maps from the end of the 17th century, and the river Nadym was noted in published form at the turn of the 17th and 18th centuries in the "Drawing Book of Siberia" by Russian geographer, cartographer and topographer, Semyon Remezov and sons, composed in 1699–1701. On the map of Tobolsk province of 1802, Nadym was already marked as having significant population. The old settlement was located 32 kilometers from the mouth of the river Nadym, and is referred to as the Nadym fortified settlement.

In 1929, a reindeer farm called "Nadym" was founded on the right bank of the river Nadym. However, in 1934 the farm was disbanded and turned into a factory.

In the fall of 1967, it was chosen as the reference framework for the development of a regional gas-bearing deposit. Surrounded by numerous lakes, the village situated on an elevated dry place was chosen for a runway for aviation. Relatively small, 12 kilometers away from the river Nadym, for which it was named, by the 1950s–1960s, the village began to be called "New Nadym".

In parallel to its accelerated pace of development, the gas company created Medvezhye gas field, with the intention of becoming a social and cultural center of the Tyumen North. In August 1971, Nadym held a groundbreaking ceremony for its first major building and on March 9, 1972, by decree of the Soviet First Secretary the industrial community Nadym was incorporated within the Nadymsky Municipal District as Nadym Urban Settlement.

== Economy ==
The town's principal enterprise is Nadymgazprom, a subsidiary of Gazprom, which accounts for roughly 11% of all natural gas produced in Russia.

Nadym is also home to the largest of Russia's independent gas producers, NOVATEK, which operates the Yurkharovskoye field.

Major construction firms based in the town include Arktikneftegazstroy, Severgazstroi, and Nadymdorstroy. Severtruboprovodstroy was also among them until April 2011, when it was declared bankrupt.

In the local oil and gas sector, RITEKNadymneft—a subsidiary of RITEK—has led the development of the Sandibinskoye and Middle Khulym oil fields.

== Climate ==
Nadym experiences a subarctic climate (Köppen Dfc). The climate is extreme, with temperatures as low as −57.7 °C (−71.9 °F) and as high as +34.7 °C (94.5 °F). On average, however, the region is very cold, with an annual mean temperature of −5.4 °C (22.3 °F). Precipitation tends to be fairly low – 496 millimeters (19.5 in) per year – and is heavier in summer than in winter.

Climate data for Nadym (1959–2012)
Month	Jan	Feb	Mar	Apr	May	Jun	Jul	Aug	Sep	Oct	Nov	Dec	Year
Record high °C (°F)	1.7 (35.1)	1.0 (33.8)	10.6 (51.1)	20.7 (69.3)	29.6 (85.3)	34.2 (93.6)	34.7 (94.5)	32.7 (90.9)	25.7 (78.3)	17.0 (62.6)	7.0 (44.6)	2.0 (35.6)	34.7 (94.5)
Mean daily maximum °C (°F)	−19.4 (−2.9)	−18.0 (−0.4)	−9.0 (15.8)	−2.8 (27.0)	4.5 (40.1)	15.2 (59.4)	20.9 (69.6)	16.3 (61.3)	9.4 (48.9)	−1.0 (30.2)	−11.9 (10.6)	−16.5 (2.3)	−0.9 (30.4)
Daily mean °C (°F)	−23.7 (−10.7)	−22.6 (−8.7)	−14.6 (5.7)	−8.2 (17.2)	−0.1 (31.8)	10.0 (50.0)	15.7 (60.3)	11.8 (53.2)	5.8 (42.4)	−4.0 (24.8)	−15.8 (3.6)	−20.9 (−5.6)	−5.4 (22.3)
Mean daily minimum °C (°F)	−28.3 (−18.9)	−27.3 (−17.1)	−20.0 (−4.0)	−13.7 (7.3)	−4.2 (24.4)	5.4 (41.7)	10.4 (50.7)	7.8 (46.0)	2.8 (37.0)	−7.0 (19.4)	−20.0 (−4.0)	−25.5 (−13.9)	−9.8 (14.4)
Record low °C (°F)	−57.7 (−71.9)	−52.2 (−62.0)	−47.1 (−52.8)	−39.2 (−38.6)	−25.6 (−14.1)	−8.1 (17.4)	−0.9 (30.4)	−5.0 (23.0)	−9.7 (14.5)	−34.7 (−30.5)	−47.5 (−53.5)	−50.4 (−58.7)	−57.7 (−71.9)
Average precipitation mm (inches)	24.3 (0.96)	19.2 (0.76)	23.0 (0.91)	27.3 (1.07)	36.6 (1.44)	57.1 (2.25)	68.6 (2.70)	70.5 (2.78)	57.0 (2.24)	51.3 (2.02)	33.8 (1.33)	27.6 (1.09)	496.3 (19.54)
Average precipitation days (≥ 0.1 mm)	18.6	15.5	15.8	13.4	14.3	13.6	12.7	15.9	16.0	20.0	18.9	19.1	193.8
Source: climatebase.ru

== Education ==
The city has nine schools. A high school, a college (since 2014 PU 4 received the status of college) and two art schools. The higher education system is represented by four branches of higher educational institutions of Russia:

- the branch of Tyumen State University
- the branch of Tyumen State Oil and Gas University
- the branch of the Moscow University of Psychology and Social
- the branch of Tomsk State University of Control Systems and Radio Electronics (TUSUR)
- a branch of Tyumen State Architectural University (TyumGASU)

== Transportation ==
The unfinished 1,524 mm (5 ft) broad-gauge Salekhard–Igarka Railway, also known as Transpolar Mainline or The Dead Road, passes through Nadym between Novy Urengoy and Salekhard (Stalin-era road). At some point in time a bridge across the Ob river to Salekhard Labytnangi was planned. To date, the only construction is the railway Salekhard-Nadym. Most roads across the river Nadym were opened in September 2015. A bridge across the Ob River is also planned along with a road running parallel to the railroad.

The Nadym Airport is on the west bank of the Nadym River.

== Culture ==
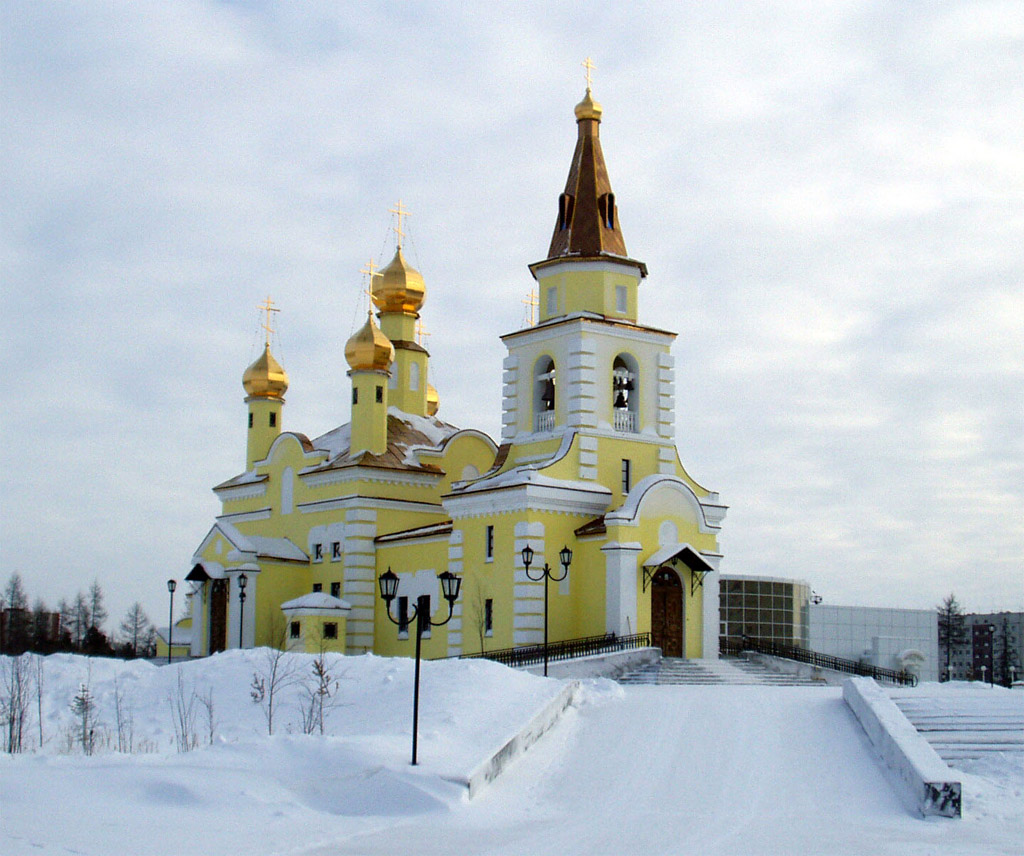
St. Nicholas Church in Nadym

The Museum of Tanya Savicheva operates in Nadym's School #2.

== International relations ==
=== Twin town ===
Nadym was twinned with Tromsø, Norway until October 2022, when Norwegian authorities cut ties, citing various reasons related to the Russo-Ukrainian war.

== Gallery ==
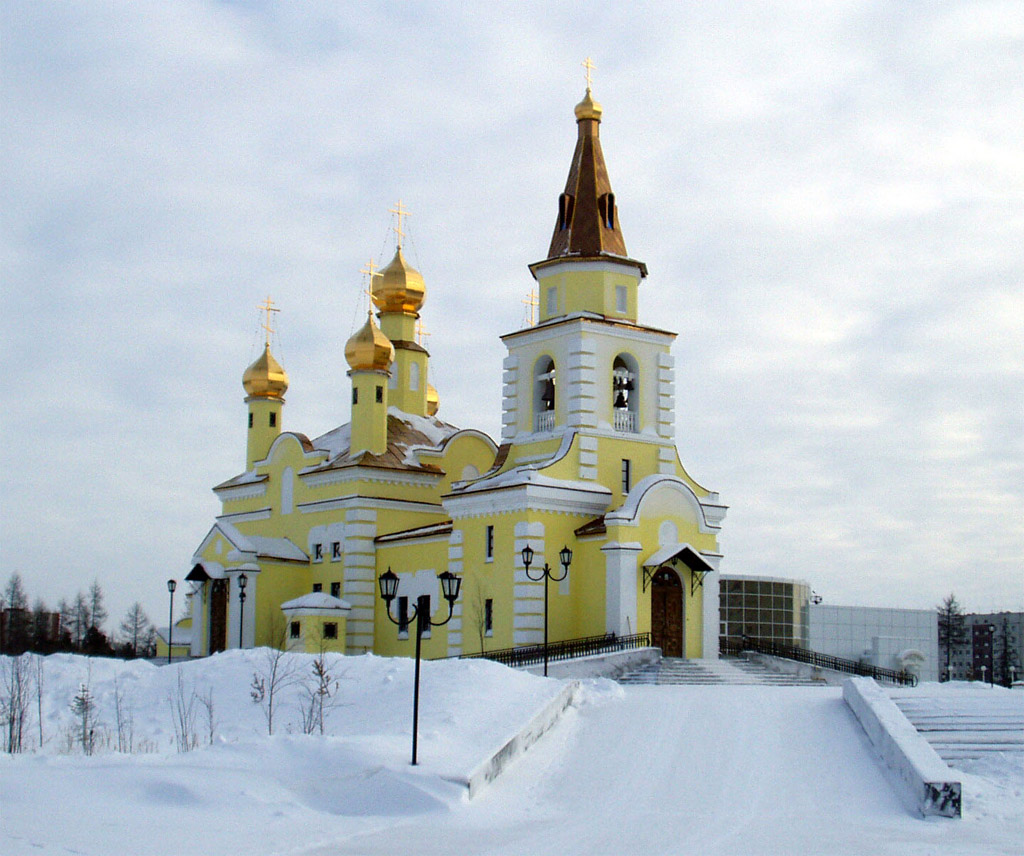
St.Nicholas Church

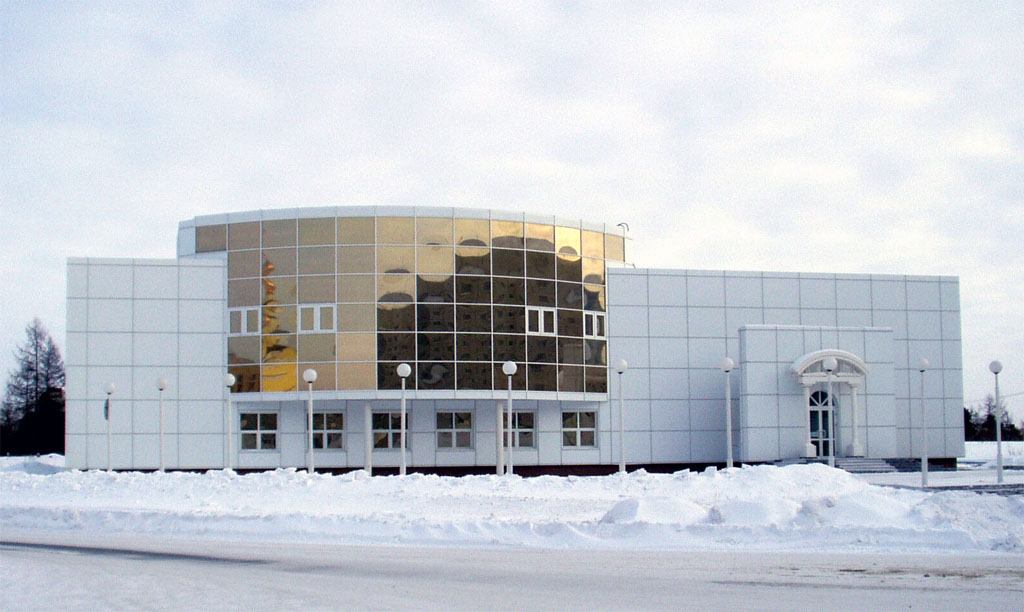
Wedding Palace

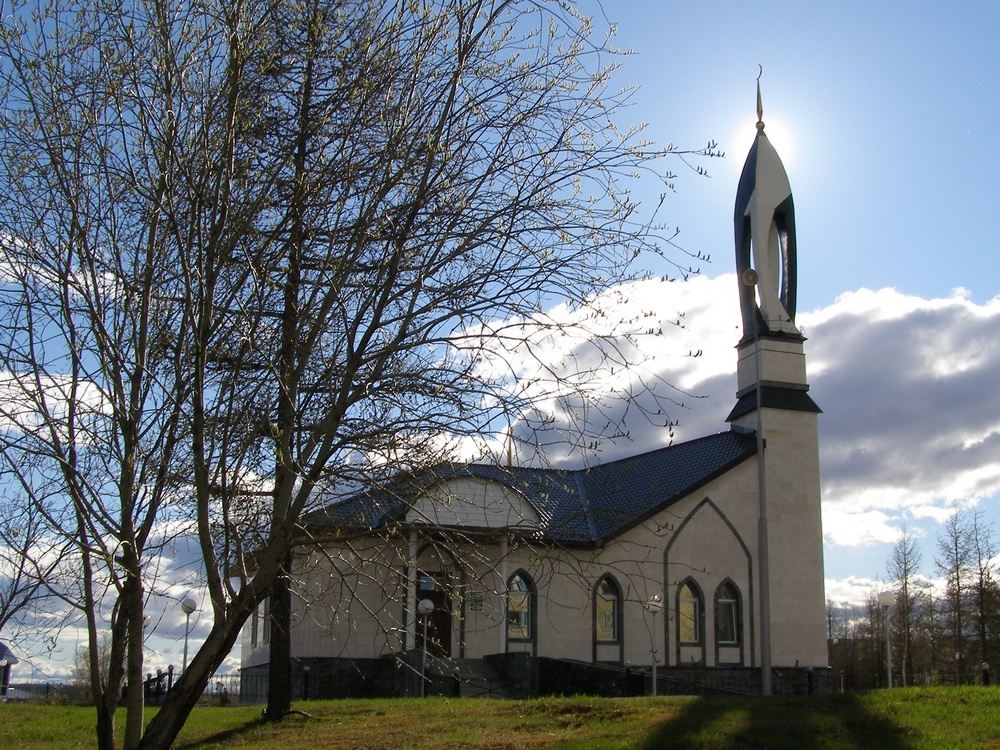
Mosque

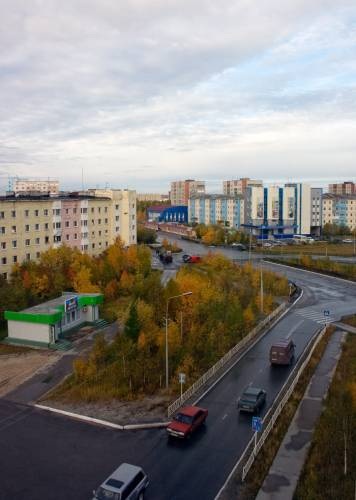
Leningradsky prospekt

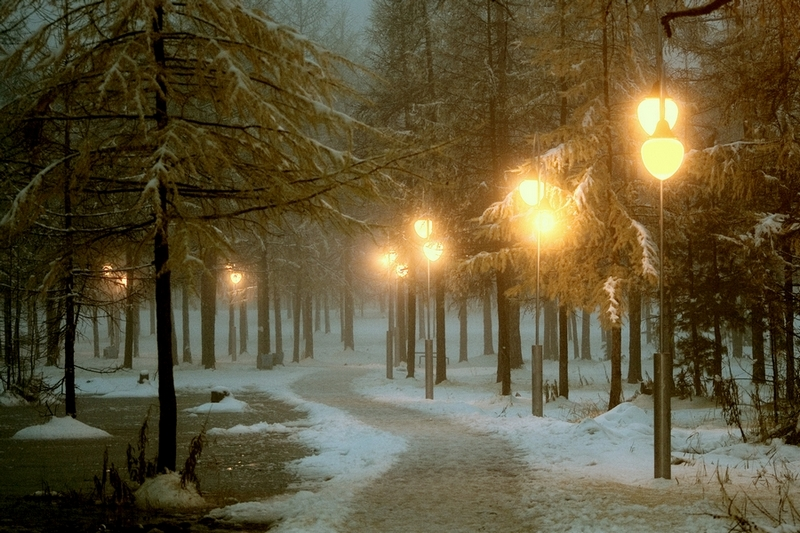
Park

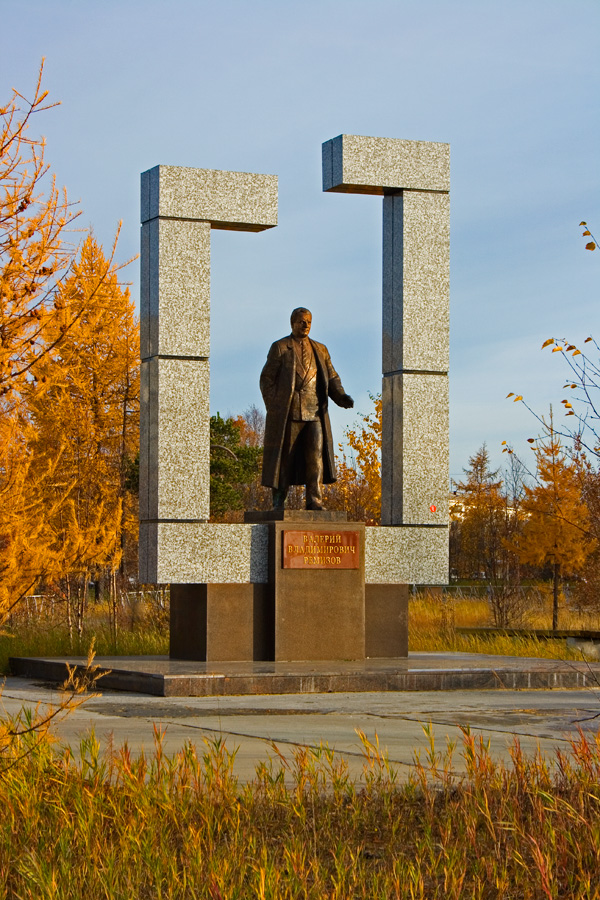
Valery Remizov monument

== See also ==
- Nadym fortified settlement
