= Upper Taz Nature Reserve =

Nature reserve in Yamalo-Nenets Autonomous Okrug, Russia

- Russian: Верхне-Тазовский заповедник (Also: Verkhne-Tazovsky)
- IUCN category Ia (strict nature reserve)
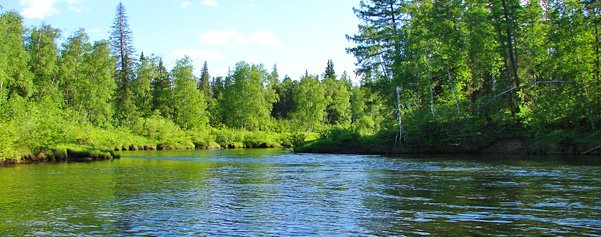
- Upper Taz Zapovednik, in the southeast of Yamalo-Nenets

- Location within Russia
- Location: Yamalo-Nenets Autonomous Okrug
- Nearest city: Krasnoselkup
- Coordinates: 63°30′14″N 84°3′28″E
- Area: 631,308 hectares (1,559,996 acres; 2,437 sq mi)
- Established: 1986
- Governing body: Ministry of Natural Resources and Environment (Russia)
- Website: https://xn--b1ak6a.xn--80aze9d.xn--h1akdx.xn--80aswg/

Upper Taz Nature Reserve (Russian: Верхне-Тазовский заповедник) (also Verkhne-Tazovsky) is a Russian 'zapovednik' (strict nature reserve) at the geographic center of the Russia Empire. It is on the upper reaches of the Taz River, on the east-central edge of the West Siberian Plain, about 700 km north of the city of Tomsk. The reserve is one of the largest in Russia, and is an important spawning ground for fish such as salmon and trout, and also protects fur-bearing animals such as the sable and ermine. It is divided into two forests - Pokolskoe and Taz, protecting the left bank of the Ratta River. The reserve is situated in the Krasnoselkupsky District of Yamalo-Nenets Autonomous Okrug.

== Topography ==
The Upper Taz Reserve protects the basin of the Ratta River, which enters the Taz River at the northern border of the reserve. The boundaries stretch 150 km north to south, and 70 km west to east. The terrain is typical of the Upper Taz hills: hilly moraine ridges (on average 50 meters), in a strongly dissected landscape of rivers and streams. The territory is bounded on the north by the Taz, and is to the west of the basin of the Yenisei River. Besides the Ratta, the other major river of the area is the Pokolku River. The tributary rivers have many rapids and shoals. The Upper Taz reserve includes the highest point in the surrounding Siberian Uvaly, at 285 meters above sea level.

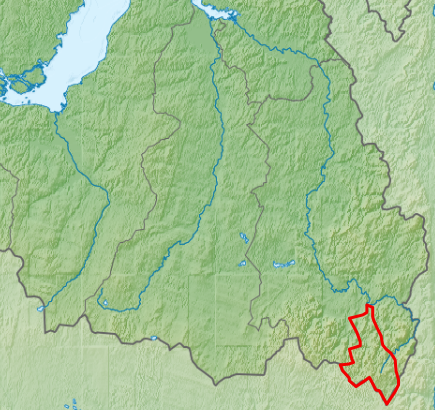
Location of Upper Taz

== Climate and ecoregion ==
Upper Taz is located in the West Siberian taiga ecoregion, a region that covers the West Siberian Plain, from the Urals to the Central Siberian Plateau. It is an area of extensive conifer boreal forests, and also extensive wetlands, including bogs and mires.

The climate of Upper Taz is Humid continental climate, cool summer (Köppen climate classification Subarctic climate (Dfc)). This climate is characterized by mild summers (only 1–3 months above 10 °C (50.0 °F)) and cold, snowy winters (coldest month below −3 °C (26.6 °F)).

== Flora and fauna ==
The reserve is about 75% forest, 15% swamp. The forests are light, with pine trees on the sandy terraces making up 60% of the trees, cedar 17%, larch 12%, birch 7%, spruce 3% and aspen 1%. The understory is relatively clear, mostly pine. To the extent a shrub layer exists, it is found in sparse clumps of juniper and rosehip.

The most common mammals are brown bear, otter, American mink, ermine, and fox; the moose population in the territory numbers perhaps 300 individuals. Wolves appear in the fall as the elk are migrating through. The upper reaches of the Taz escaped most logging, and forest animals of the Euro-Asian boundaries have found refuge in isolated areas. Scientists on the reserve have recorded 68 species of vertebrates, and 98 species of birds. Most of the bird biodiversity is in the floodplains. The upper reaches of the Taz are important spawning and wintering grounds for salmon and whitefish.

== Ecoeducation and access ==
As a strict nature reserve, the Upper Taz Reserve is mostly closed to the general public, although scientists and those with 'environmental education' purposes can make arrangements with park management for visits. There are a number of 'ecotourist' routes in the reserve, however, that are open to the public, but require permits to be obtained in advance. The main office is in the village of Krasnoselkup, which is far from the territory itself. Guided ecotours are conducted by boat, snowmobile, and on foot.

== See also ==
- List of Russian Nature Reserves (class 1a 'zapovedniks')
- Lake Dynda
