= Kazym rebellion =

1931–1934 uprisings by Khanty and Nenets in the Soviet Union

- Part of resistance to collectivization in the Soviet Union
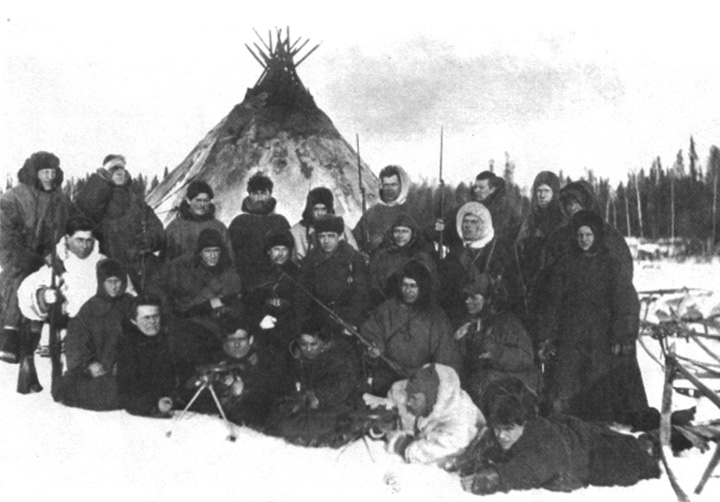
- An OGPU task force after an operation, March 1934
Date	1931–1934; Main stage: 1933
Location	Khanty-Mansi Autonomous Okrug, Russian SFSR, Soviet Union
Result	Soviet victory, native resistance suppressed

Belligerents
Khanty; Nenets	Soviet Union

Casualties and losses
88 arrested 11 executed	5 killed

The Kazym Rebellion (Russian: Казымское восстание) was a revolt by the indigenous Khanty and Nenets peoples who live in western Siberia against the Soviet Union in 1933. The revolt, which was named after the small town of Kazym in the Khanty-Mansi Autonomous Okrug, was over the enforcement of collectivisation by the Communist state. Some sources describe the events as the "Kazym rebellions", listing a series of conflicts between and 1931 and 1934.

The revolt, which began in the lake Numto area, eventually spread to the town of Kazym. It was ended by the Red Army, which slaughtered Khanty and Nenets and burned their forest settlements. This was the last known conflict between the Siberian tribes and Russian state.

== Background ==
In 1930, Joseph Stalin's Soviet government established the new settlement of Kazym as a "cultural base" in the Beloyarsky District, Khanty-Mansi Autonomous Okrug. In theory, cultural bases were meant to entice the Khanty people into village life with the benefits of schools, hospitals, stores, and other communal conveniences. This effort to collectivise native peoples into manageable communities saw a significant number of Khanty abandoning their forest way of life. Despite this many were also forcibly relocated. Khanty children were removed from their parents and sent to compulsory boarding schools located in towns where they were stopped from speaking their native languages or following their cultural beliefs. However, the boarding school in Kazym taught classes in the Khanty language. Collectivisation was implemented alongside the abduction and execution of traditional Khanty leaders who were labelled "kulaks" by the Joint State Political Directorate (OGPU).

== Beginnings ==
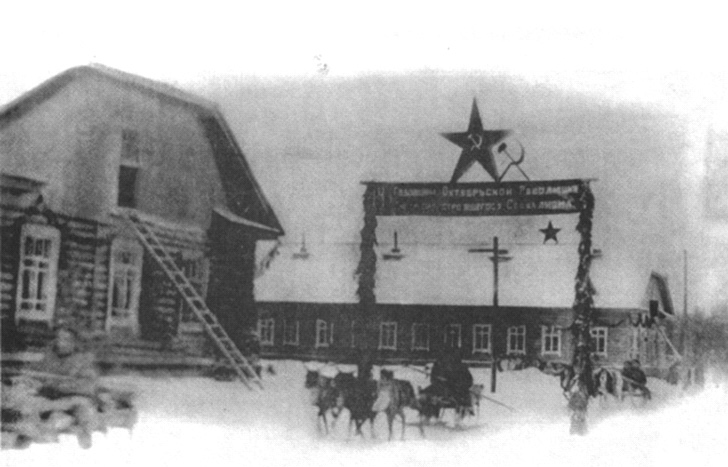
The Kazym cultural base c. 1931

By 1931 the relationship between the European Russian colonizers and Siberian natives had deteriorated. Native children were being taken from their families by force, threat of violence or through the confiscation of fishing equipment. Without the fishing gear, natives were unable to feed themselves or have a livelihood. In response members of the Khanty and Nenet tribes broke in the Kazym boarding school and forcibly removed their children.

From then on the indigenous people demonstrated their resistance to the Soviet State by moving deeper into Siberia and staying away from Russian settlements. The Soviet security service (OGPU) response was to start imprisoning the Khanty's and Nenet's shamans because they were the spiritual leaders and cultural guardians of their people. As the natives' resistance was not violent or destructive, the shamans were charged with the crime of "wrong understanding of the world" because within the totalitarian Soviet Union what did not align with State ideology was deemed to be a crime. As such legal formalities were often secondary and often made up.

== Escalation ==
The events that led to the outbreak of violence began in mid 1933 when local Soviet authorities decided to start exploiting the fishing resources in Lake Numto. This area of freshwater was sacred to the Khanty and Nenets; the name Num-To in the Khanty languages means "Lake of the God". After a Russian work party was sent to the lake, it was prevented by native people from fishing in the lake. The stand off resulted in a radiogram being sent to a local Communist committee. Assistance was sent from the town of Kazym, Beryozovo, Khanty-Mansiysk and Yekaterinburg. But despite the support from bureaucrats, party officials and security personnel they failed to persuade the Khanty and Nenets to back down resulting in the Soviet delegation leaving the area.

However in December 1933, another five-person Russian work squad was sent to Numto lake led by Polina Schneider, a female apparatchik from the Communist Party committee of Ural Oblast. Ignoring protests from the natives, she led them and her group to the island in the middle of the lake - which to the Khanty - was both sacred and where women were not permitted to go. Schneider is said to have fired her pistol at the Khanty idols in defiance of the natives faith and also made demeaning comments about them. Faced with such disrespect, the indigenous people seized the group of Russians. All five were taken to a nearby hill where they strangled to death with Reindeer lassos.

== Conflict ==
News of the killings had eventually reached Beryozovo by 1934. In response the Soviets despatched Red Army and OGPU units to punish the Khanty and Nenets. Over the next few weeks, a series of clashes occurred between the Russians and indigenous peoples. However, events differ greatly between native witnesses and official Soviet records.

The Khanty and Nenets claim a countless number of their forest settlements were destroyed and their peoples executed, raped, bombed from the planes, used for target practice for grenades, beaten to death with wooden clubs, drowned in icy holes or left in the tundra without food, clothing or shelter to die. Hundreds died; only five survivors were ever found.

In contrast the Soviet archives record that no inhumane action was undertaken by the Red Army or OGPU. A total of 88 natives were detained and no prisoners were executed; all soldiers conducted the operation in a fair and humane manner. Regardless of the differences, Khanty and Nenet resistance against Soviet Union was permanently suppressed in 1934.

== Dramatisation ==
Yeremey Aypin, a Khanty writer, wrote a fictional novel entitled Our Lady in the blood-splattered snow (Russian: «Божья матерь в кровавых снегах»), which was published in 2002 and served as a basis for a movie named The Khanty Saga (Russian: "Сага о Хантах") produced in 2008.

== See also ==
- Mandalada, a separate revolt by the Nenets people during the Soviet period
