= Tolka =

Tolka may refer to:

- River Tolka, a river in Dublin, Ireland
- Tolka Park, a football stadium in Dublin
- Tolka (Taz), a river in Yamalo-Nenets Autonomous Okrug, Russia
- Tolka, Krasnoselkupsky District, a village in Yamalo-Nenets Autonomous Okrug, Russia
