= Vakh =

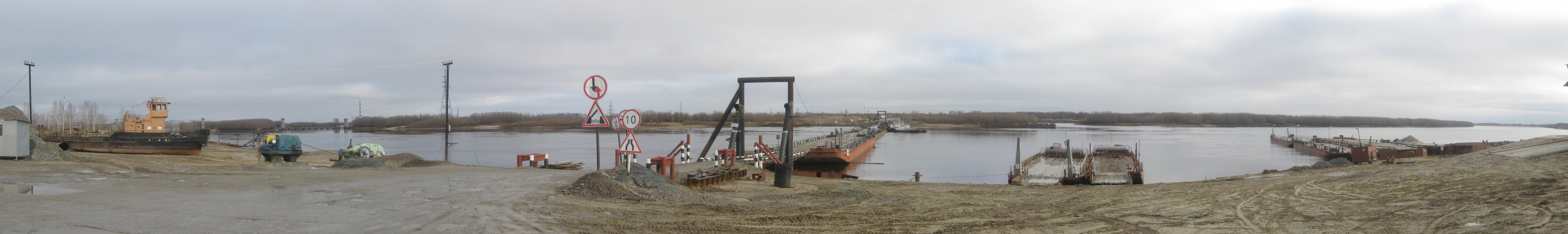

Location
- Country: Russia
- Region: Khanty-Mansi Autonomous Okrug

Physical characteristics
- Mouth: Ob
  - coordinates: 60.8191°N 76.8184°E
- Length: 964 km (599 mi)
- Basin size: 76,700 km^{2} (29,600 mi^{2})

Basin features
- Progression: Ob→ Kara Sea

The Vakh (Russian: Вах) is a river in Khanty–Mansia, Russia. It is a right tributary of the Ob. The Vakh is 964 kilometres (599 mi) long with a basin area of 76,700 square kilometres (29,600 mi^{2}).

The river is a status B Ramsar wetland, nominated for designation as a Wetland of International Importance in 2000.

== Course ==
Its source is near the drainage basins of the Yenisei and the Taz. Since the Vakh, like the Ket, flows from east to west, it was an important early transportation route. A short portage connects its headwaters to the Sym, which flows into the Yenisei. To the northeast lies the basin of the Vatinsky Yogan.

=== Tributaries ===
The Vakh's main tributaries are the Kulynigol, the Sabun, the Kolikyogan, and the Myogtygyogan. The interfluvial area between two of the Vakh tributaries, the Kolikyogan and Sabun, is a zone of raised string bogs covering 12,885 square kilometres (4,975 sq mi).

== History ==
Early pottery from the Vakh basin, Vasyugan and Tomsk-Chulym is dominated by comb-pit decorations. An 1875 account of the people of the region said, "The Samoyedes of Southern Siberia are neighbours of the Youraks, and inhabit the Upper Taz, the Yelogouï, and the affluents of the Vakh river. They are pure Samoyedes as regards race."

Russians began to significantly affect the Khanty people on the Vakh river area by 1896. These people were eking out a living by hunting, fishing and selling squirrel skins. The Russians introduced tobacco and alcohol. Moral codes began breaking down, and new infectious diseases were introduced. There was a brief attempt to counter the problems through shamanistic ceremonies. Valuable horses were sacrificed, but without effect.
