= Mangazeya =

Former Russian town in Siberia

Mangazeya Мангазея
- Town (abolished)
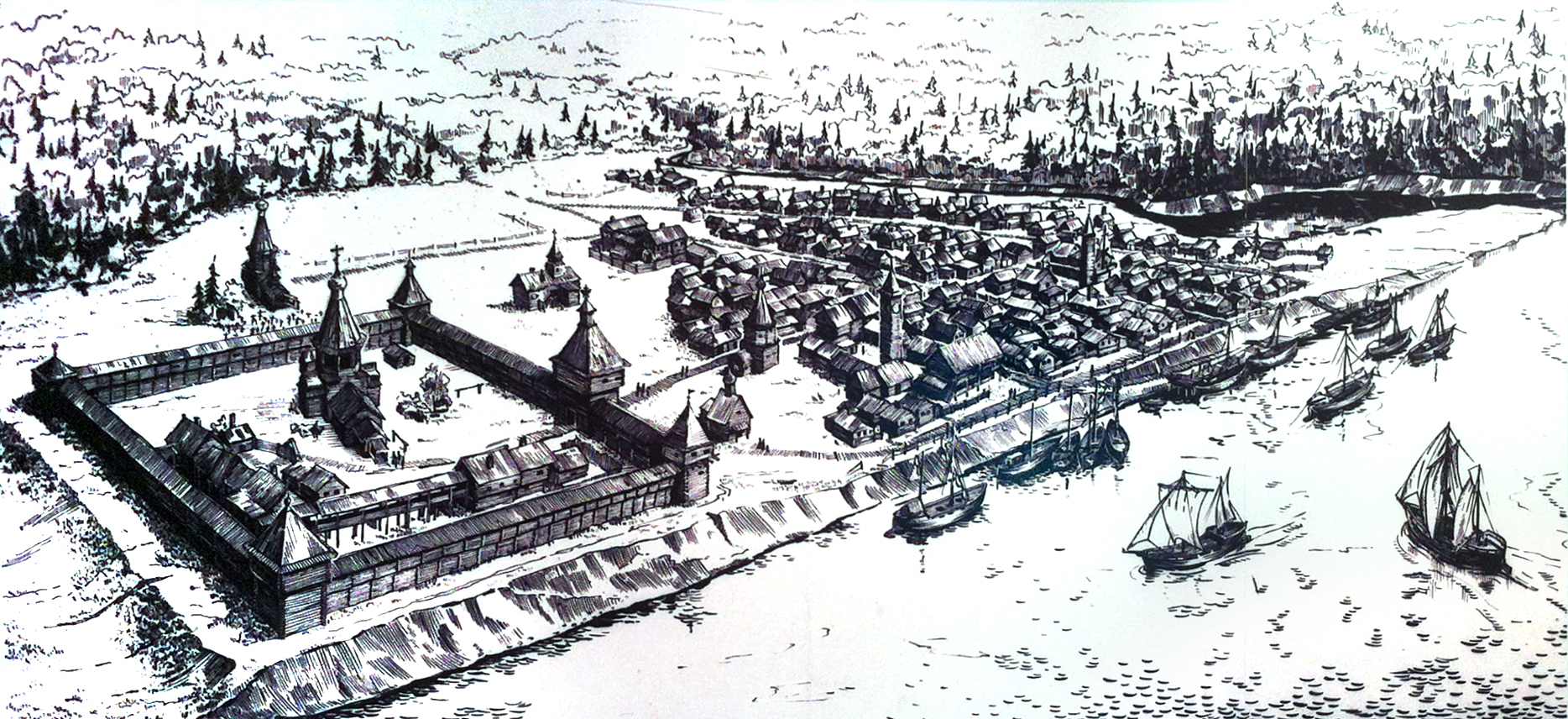
- Interactive map of Mangazeya
- Location of Mangazeya Mangazeya (Yamalo-Nenets Autonomous Okrug)
- Coordinates: 66.6938292°N 82.2546387°E
- Country: Russia
- Federal subject: Yamalo-Nenets Autonomous Okrug
- Administrative district: Krasnoselkupsky District
- Founded: 1601
- Abolished: 1672

Mangazeya (Russian: Мангазе́я) was a Russian town in northwestern Siberia, in what is now Krasnoselkupsky District of Yamalo-Nenets Autonomous Okrug. It was located on the Taz River, 280 kilometres (170 mi) from its mouth, at the confluence of the Osetrovka (Mangazeyka) River. It was founded in 1601 and became a major trade centre. Its population left in 1672. It is now an archaeological site.

== Etymology ==
The name derives from the Nenets ethnonym Monkansi or Mongandi.

== History ==
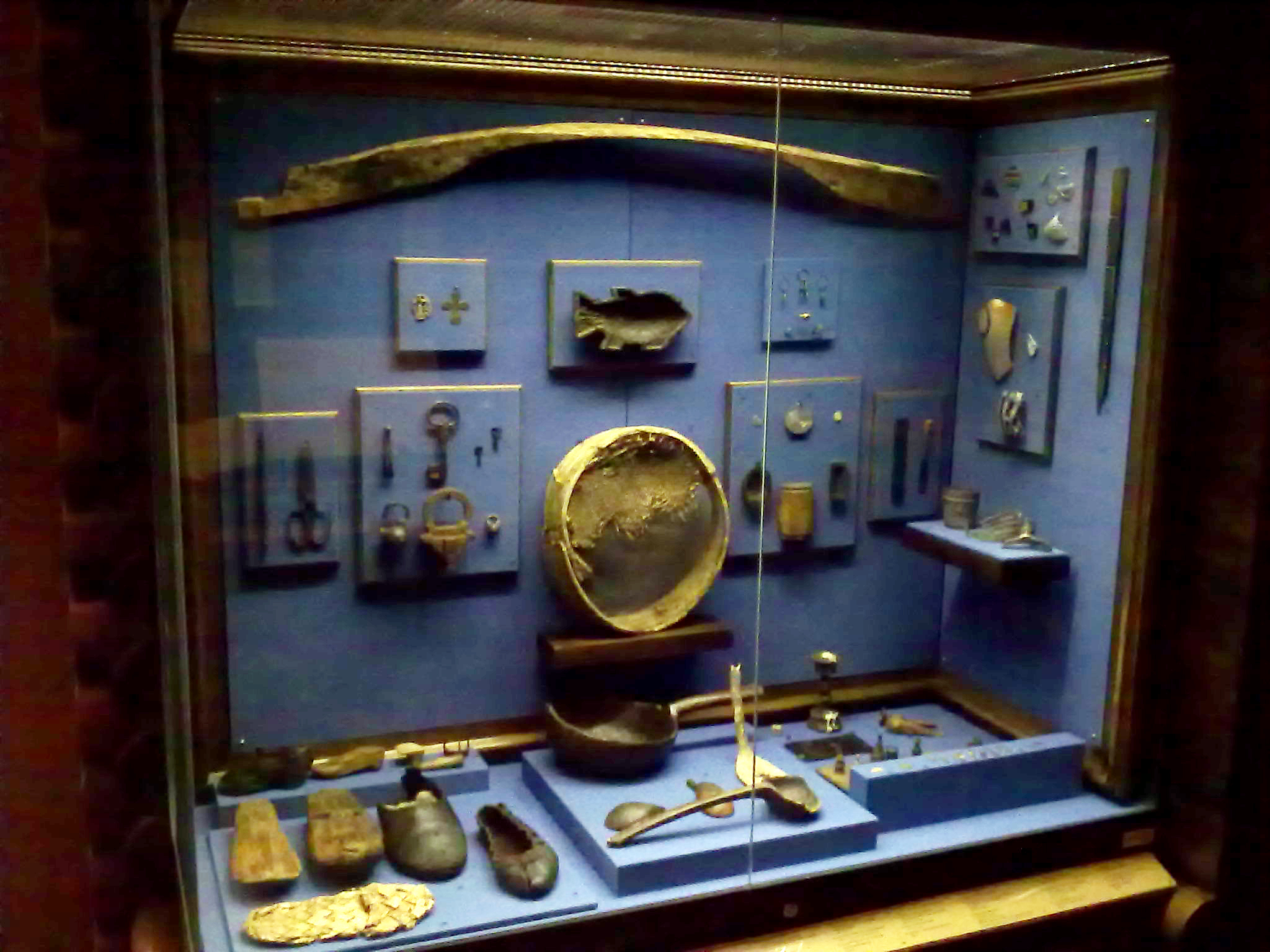
Materials of archaeological excavations in Mangazeya (State Historical Museum, Moscow)

=== Background ===
Russian settlers of the White Sea coasts of Russia known as Pomors founded a route along the Arctic coast to Arkhangelsk to trade with Norwegian, English and Dutch merchants. Before the town was founded, Mangazeya was already used to refer to the region around the Taz River.

Regular private trading and hunting voyages to the Mangazeya region from the White Sea area probably began not long before the second half of the 16th century. Trading expeditions to the lower Ob over land are dated to the early 16th century. Although reliable Russian sources mention the first private sea voyages to the Mangazeya region at the end of the 16th century, it is known that there were encounters between Russian and English merchants in the White and Barents Seas in the second half of the 16th century. It is probable that the first settlement in the region was built during that time, on the lower course of the Taz River.

=== Early history ===
Russian Pomors organised the first private expeditions to the region. Mangazeya was founded in 1601 by Russian servicemen, near the site of an older settlement. It was built by M. M. Shakhovskoy on the order of Tsar Boris Godunov. It was situated on the Taz River, between the lower courses of the Ob and Yenisei Rivers, all of which flow into the Arctic Ocean.

In 1607, the ostrog (fortress) was rebuilt into a wooden kremlin with five towers under D. V. Zherebtsov, the voivode (military governor) of Mangazeya, and the clerk K. P. Davydov. The military garrison in the town consisted of 50–60 streltsy. The town's permanent residents, numbering about 750, engaged in crafts and trade. Even under extreme conditions, they raised pigs, cattle, and chickens. In the first quarter of the 17th century, the city could host between 1,000 and 2,000 people during trading seasons. Mangazeya also served as the main base for Russian expansion into Siberia's Far North.

Commercial voyages increased until the Russian government banned the sea route in 1619. Tsar Michael of Russia feared that the English could use the route to annex Russian territory. This followed a report by Prince I. S. Kurakin, the voivode of Tobolsk. As a result, the main route to Mangazeya became the river passage through the Irtysh and Ob.

This ban had a negative impact on Mangazeya's growth. The city closed to outsiders: navigational markings were torn up, posts established to intercept anyone attempting to pass through, and maps were falsified. The fur trade was therefore limited to Russians as foreign merchants could not trade with Mangazeya. In 1630–1631, its two voivodes waged war against each other, leading to the destruction of the town centre.

=== Decline ===
From the late 1630s, as a result of the depletion of fur resources and a change in trade routes, the town began to lose its importance as a commercial and administrative centre. The town's citadel was destroyed in 1642 in a fire, but the town remained populous in the following decade. However, in 1667, the sailing route to Mangazeya from inner Siberia by way of the Ob and the gulfs of the Ob and Taz was banned. As a result, Mangazeya's importance as a trading centre was completely lost.

In 1672, the local Russian population was transferred to the settlement of Staroturukhansk, also known as New Mangazeya, located on the Yenisei. The new town was established that year on the order of Tsar Alexis. Mangazeya continued to be used for collecting tribute, but in 1679, it was completely abandoned as a result of an attack on the families of streltsy tax collectors by the Nenets. Only the chapel remained; it was rebuilt several times and functioned until the 1920s.

In the 20th century, archaeologists discovered remains of the wooden kremlin and gostiny dvor (trading centre) on the site of Mangazeya. Footwear, clothing, and household items dating to the 17th century have also been reconstructed. A large collection of ship components have been found, important for the scientific reconstruction of the koch, a type of boat for which no detailed depictions or drawings have survived.

== Economy ==
Mangazeya accumulated furs and ivory (walrus tusks) around the year to be shipped out during the short Northern summer. Trade also occurred along the Northern Route of the Siberian River Routes. It became "a virtual Baghdad of Siberia, a city-state, all but independent of the Russian Empire in its wealth and utter isolation." Mangazeya served as a collection point for the tsar's treasury, where valuable export furs were gathered from Russian traders and from indigenous peoples paying the yasak, or tribute.

The Russian state was unable to collect taxes, and there was a fear of English trading penetration into Siberia; furthermore, "Mangazeya had aroused the envy of inland merchants working out of the Urals, Tyumen, and Tobolsk, who saw it siphoning off commerce that would otherwise have come their way."

== Sources ==
- "Мангазея" . Brockhaus and Efron Encyclopedic Dictionary (in Russian). 1906.
- Okhuizen, Edwin; Nielsen, Jens Petter, eds. (12 September 2022). From Northeast Passage to Northern Sea Route: A History of the Waterway North of Eurasia. BRILL. ISBN 978-90-04-52184-1.
- Stolberg, Eva-Maria (12 November 2009). "Russian Waterways". In Zumerchik, John; Danver, Steven L. (eds.). Seas and Waterways of the World: An Encyclopedia of History, Uses, and Issues [2 volumes]. Bloomsbury Publishing USA. ISBN 978-1-85109-716-6.
- Vizgalov, G. P. (2011). "Мангазея". In Kravets, S. L. (ed.). Большая российская энциклопедия. Том 18: Ломоносов — Манизер (in Russian). Большая российская энциклопедия. pp. 728–729. ISBN 978-5-85270-351-4. Archived from the original on 25 April 2026.
