= Agan =

Agan Аган
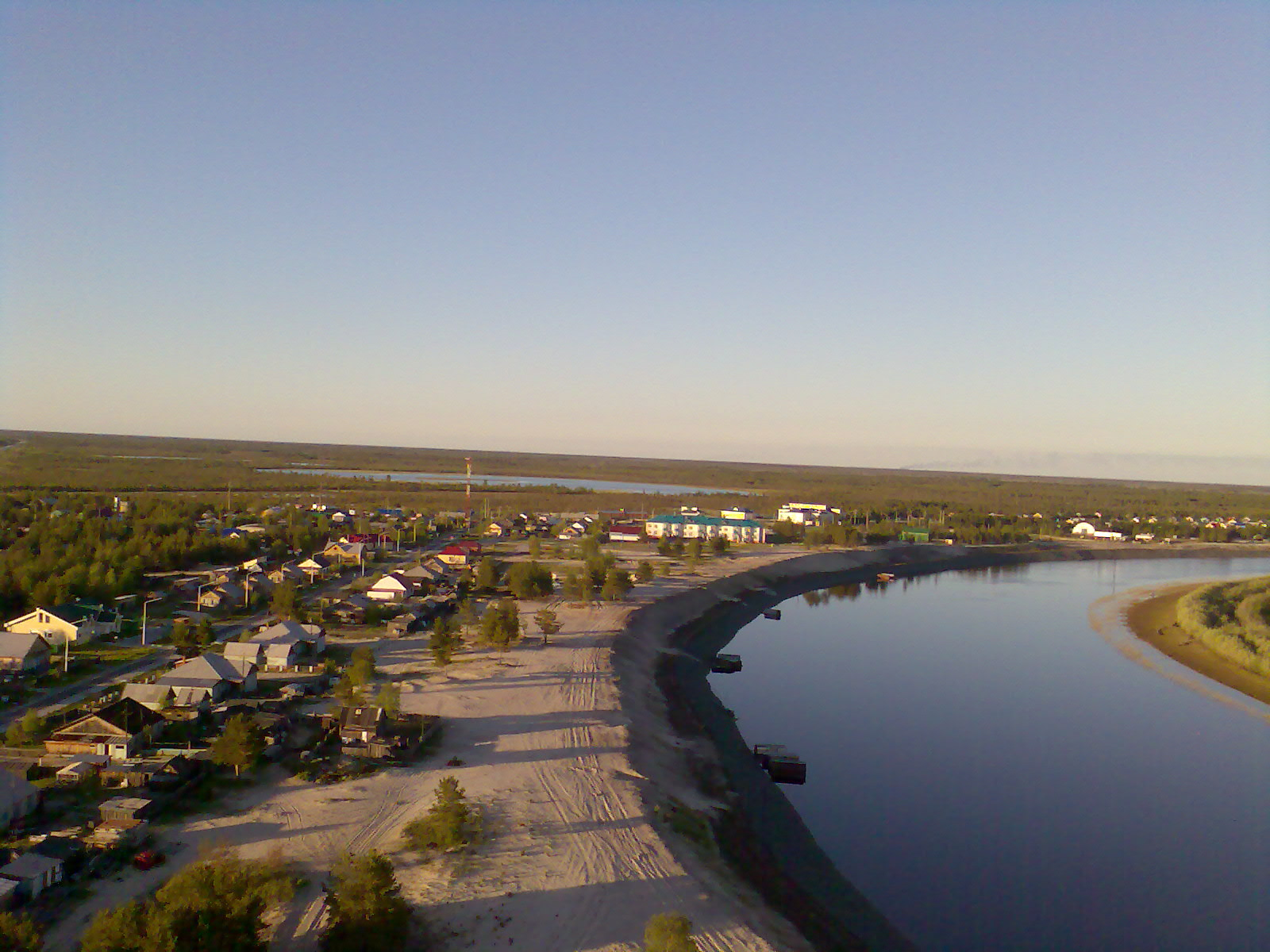

Location
- Country: Russia

Physical characteristics
- Mouth: Tromyogan
  - coordinates: 61.3716°N 74.4806°E
- Length: 544 km (338 mi)
- Basin size: 32,200 km^{2} (12,400 sq mi)

Basin features
- Progression: Tromyogan→ Ob→ Kara Sea

The Agan (Russian: Аган) is a river in Khanty-Mansi Autonomous Okrug in Russia. It is 544 kilometres (338 mi) long, and its basin covers 32,200 square kilometres (12,400 mi^{2}).

== Course ==
The Agan is a left tributary of the Tromyogan, of the Ob basin. To the south of its course lies the basin of the Vatinsky Yogan.

== See also ==
- List of rivers of Russia
