= Sabun (river) =

Sabun Сабун
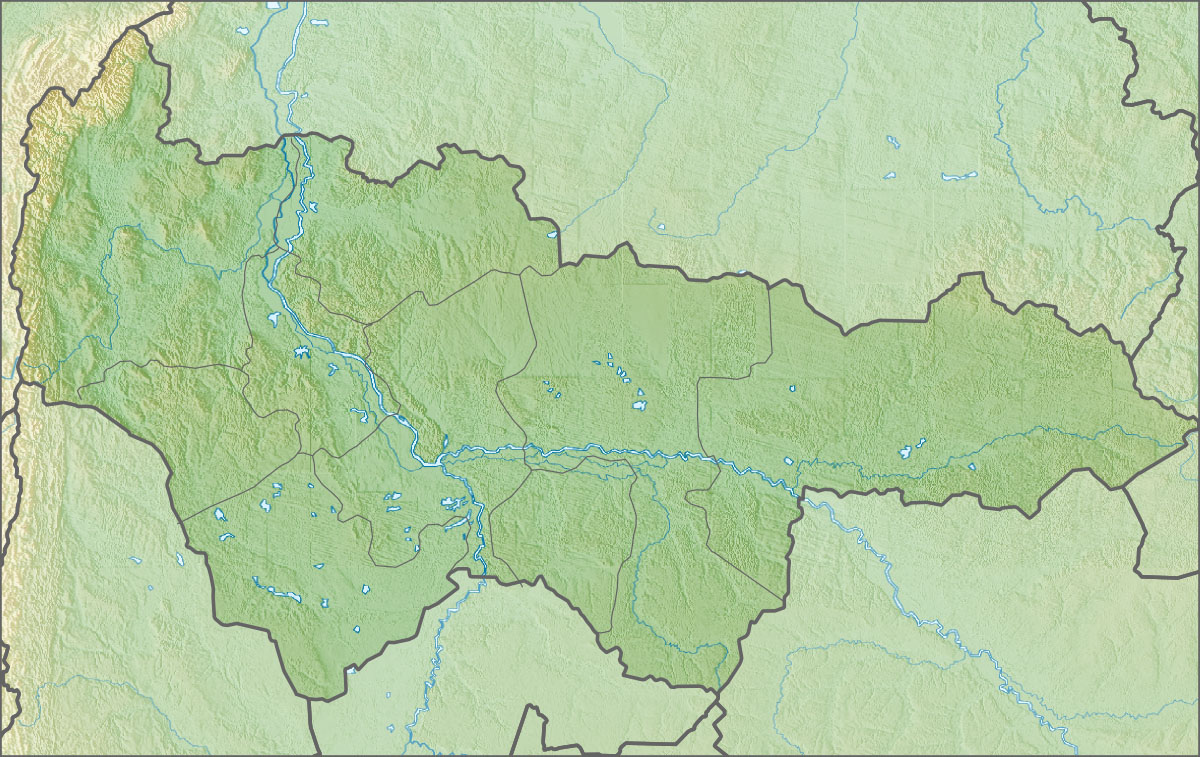
- Mouth location in Khanty-Mansi Autonomous Okrug, Russia

Location
- Country: Russia
- Region: Khanty-Mansi Autonomous Okrug

Physical characteristics
- Source
  - coordinates: 63.125658°N 80.921516°E
- Mouth: Vakh
  - coordinates: 61.08083°N 80.22361°E
- Length: 328 km (204 mi)
- Basin size: 15,700 km^{2} (6,100 sq mi)

Basin features
- Progression: Vakh→ Ob→ Kara Sea

The Sabun (Russian: Сабун) is a river in the Khanty-Mansi Autonomous Okrug in Russia. It is a right-hand tributary of the westward-flowing Vakh, which it enters from the north. It is 328 kilometres (204 mi) long, and has a drainage basin of 15,700 square kilometres (6,100 sq mi).

== Environment ==
The interfluvial area between the Kolikyogan and Sabun of the west Siberian lowland is a zone of raised string bogs covering 12,885 square kilometres (4,975 sq mi). It is a status B Ramsar wetland, nominated for designation as a Wetland of International Importance in 2000. Martens are found throughout the Sabun valley, as well as sables and kidas, crosses between sables and martens.

== History ==
In the early 1940s the inhabitants of the upper reaches of the Tolka, 500 kilometres (310 mi) to the north, were resettled by the Soviet authorities in the Sabun basin after their shamans had been arrested and executed. They brought their reindeer with them, but the reindeer could not adapt and many died. The people of the community were unable to find food in the new environment, and some starved. They were allowed to return to the Tolka after the war.

== Sources ==
- Brenzinger, Matthias (2007-01-01). Language Diversity Endangered. Walter de Gruyter. p. 245. ISBN 978-3-11-019712-9.
- Fraser, Lauchlan H.; Keddy, Paul A. (2005-06-10). The World's Largest Wetlands: Ecology and Conservation. Cambridge University Press. ISBN 978-0-521-83404-9.
- Ognev, Sergeĭ Ivanovich (1962). Mammals of Eastern Europe and Northern Asia: Carnivora (Fissipedia and Pinnipedia). Israel Program for Scientific Translations.
