= Numto =

Lake in Yamalo-Nenets Autonomous Okrug, Russia

- Нумто
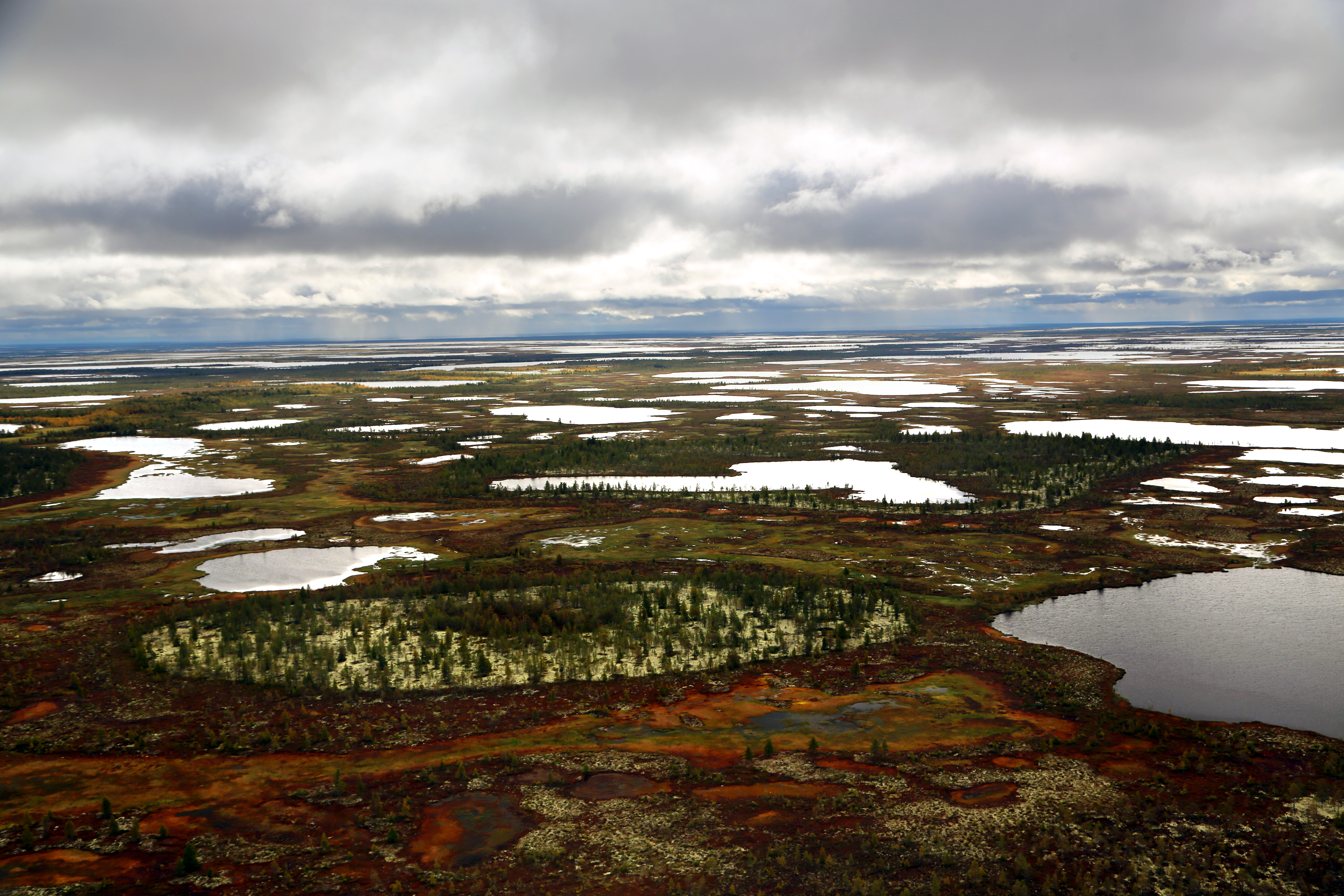
- View of the wetland area surrounding lake Numto

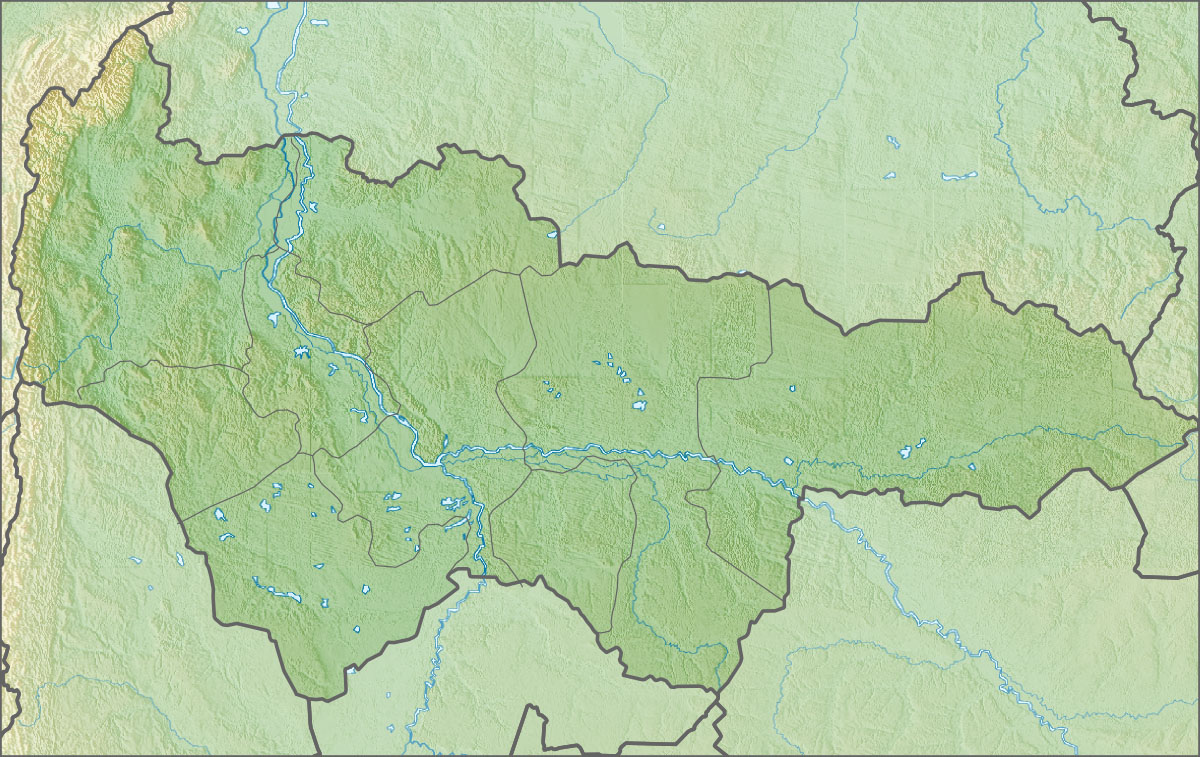
- Location in the Khanty-Mansi Autonomous Okrug, Russia

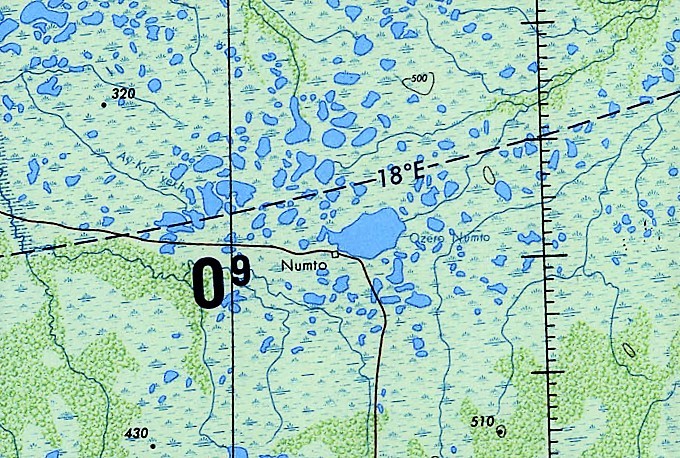
- Numto lake ONC map section.
- Location: Beloyarsky District
- Coordinates: 63°31′N 71°27′E
- Lake type: Thaw lake
- Primary outflows: Nadym
- Basin countries: Russia
- Max. length: 12.5 kilometres (7.8 mi)
- Max. width: 7.5 kilometres (4.7 mi)
- Surface area: 62 square kilometres (24 sq mi)
- Islands: One
- Settlements: Numto

Numto (Russian: Нумто) is a freshwater lake in Khanty-Mansi Autonomous Okrug, Russia. The village of Numto, part of the Kazym rural settlement, is located at the southwestern of the lake by its shore. Historically it was the place where the Kazym rebellion flared up in the early 1930s.

== Etymology ==
The name of the lake comes from Num-To, which in the language of the Khanty means the lake of God.

== Oil and gas exploration controversy ==
Numto is a traditional sacred site for the local Khanty people. The lake is part of an integrated 597,189.5 hectares (1,475,687 acres) protected area which was established in 1997 in Beloyarsky District and which is complemented by the Numto Natural Park in adjacent Nadymsky District of Yamalo-Nenets Autonomous Okrug to the north. The area, however is under threat from oil and gas drilling operations.

== Geography ==
Numto is a lake of thermokarst origin located in an area of numerous smaller lakes of the Siberian Uvaly. It has a roughly semicircular shape. There is a small heart-shaped island near the western end of the lake that is a sacred place in local shamanism.

The lake is located in the Beloyarsky District, at the northern limit of the Khanty-Mansi Autonomous Okrug, near the border of Yamalo-Nenets Autonomous Okrug. The area of the lake is covered with sparse larch taiga and swamps.

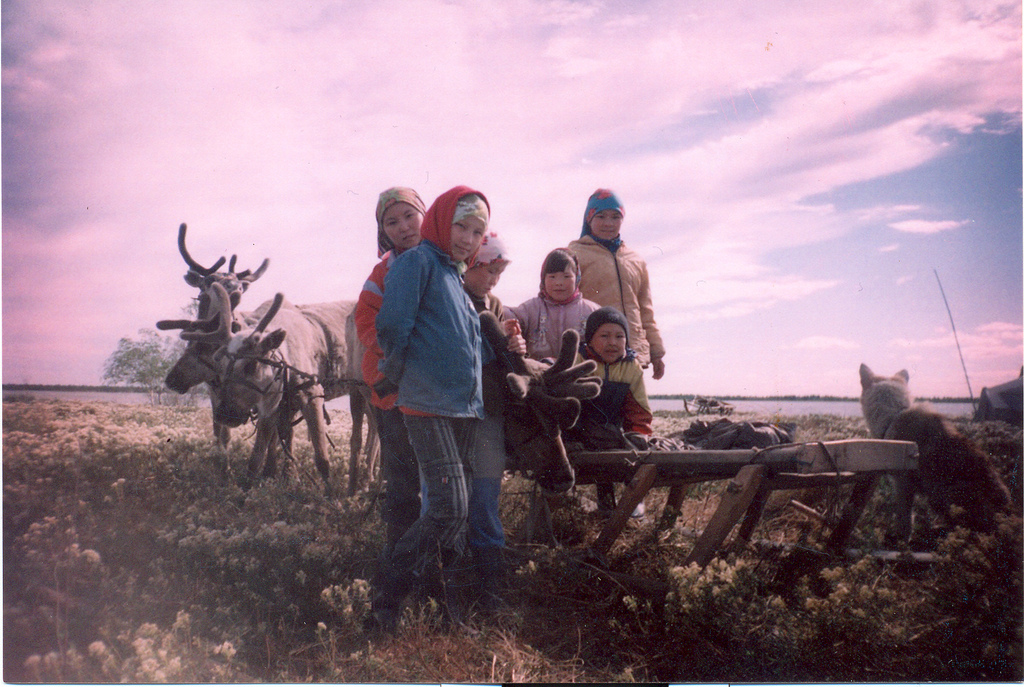
Khanty children and reindeer sledge by lake Numto.

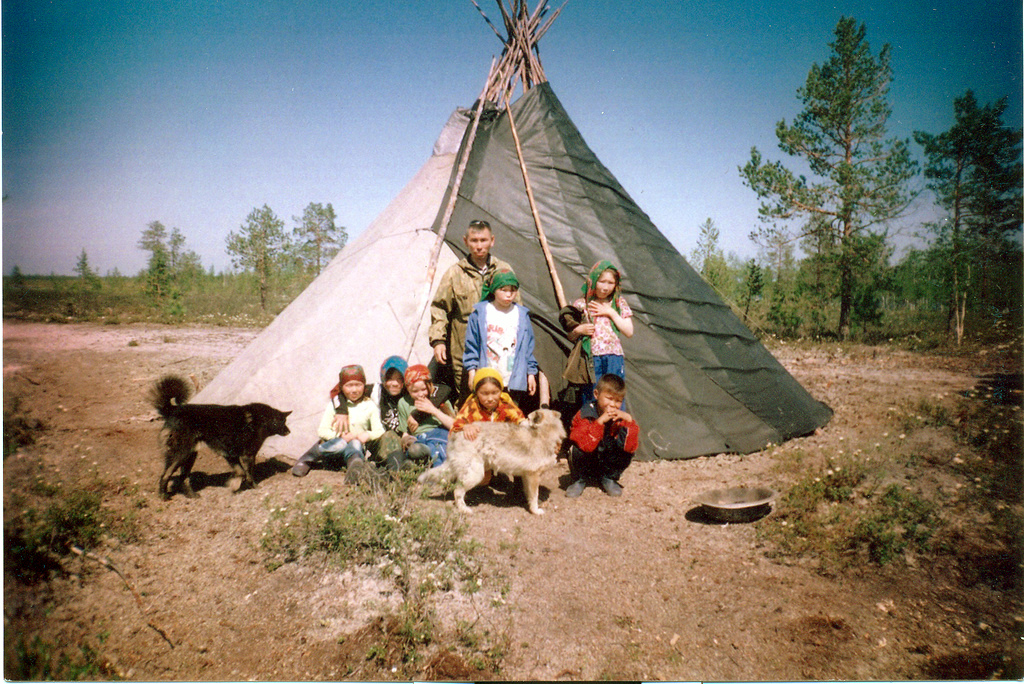
Khanty group in front of a chum near lake Numto.

== See also ==
- Association to Save Yugra
- List of lakes of Russia
- Petroleum exploration in the Arctic
