= Tromyogan =

River in Russia

Tromyogan Тромъёган
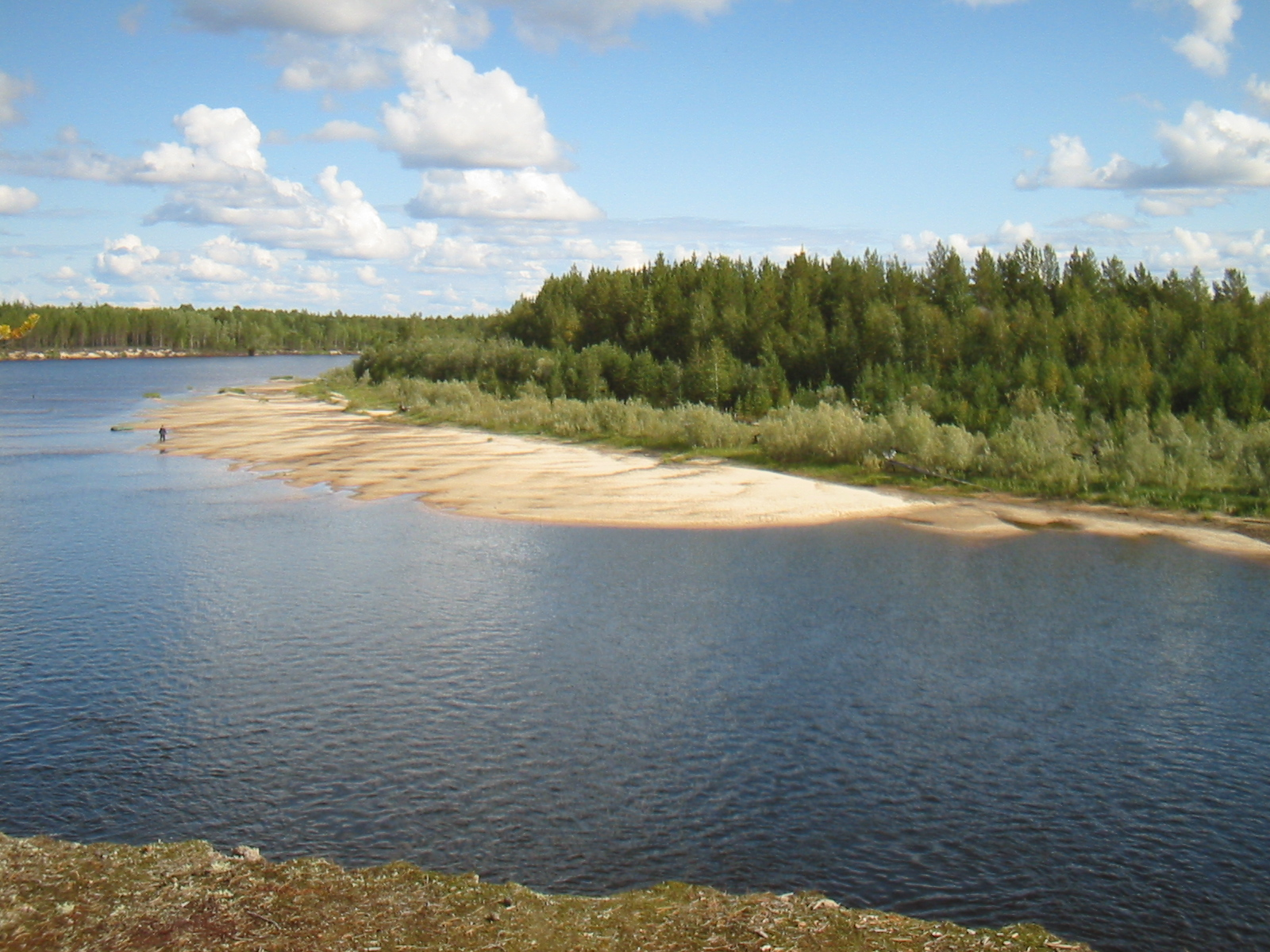

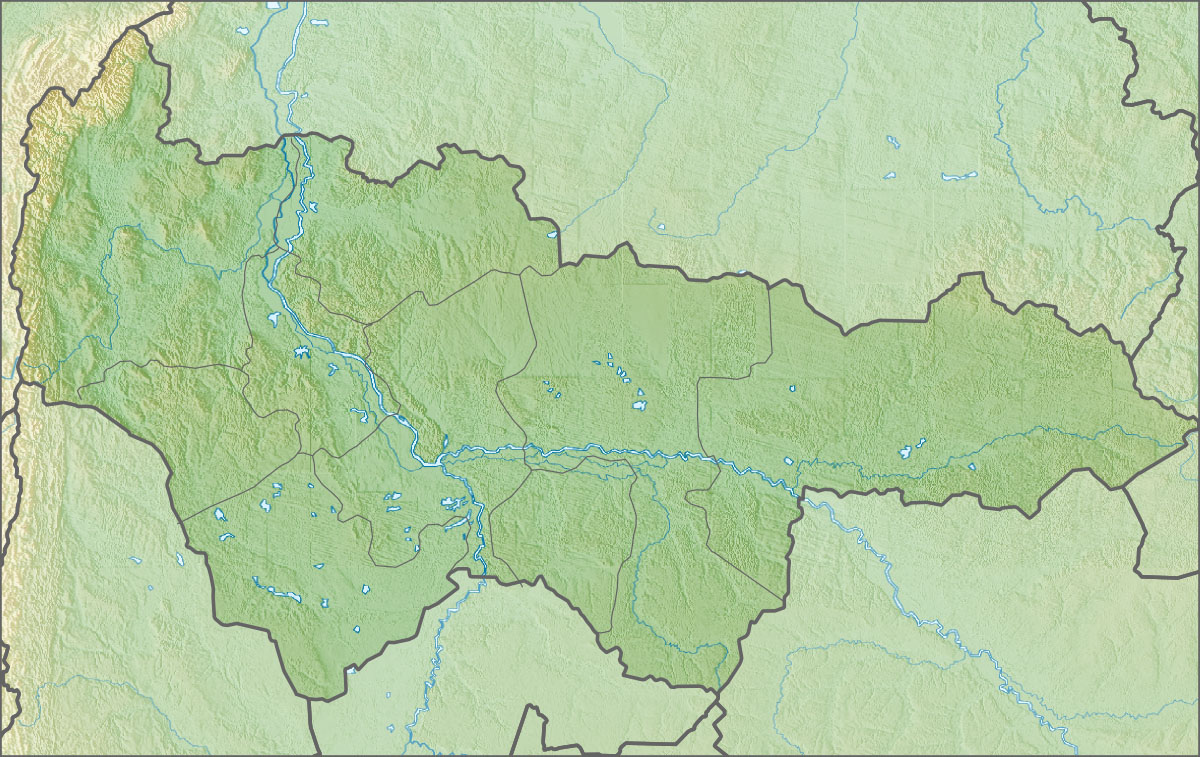
- Mouth location in Khanty-Mansi Autonomous Okrug, Russia

Physical characteristics
- Source: Siberian Uvaly
- Mouth: Ob
  - coordinates: 61.2165°N 73.7023°E
- Length: 581 km (361 mi)
- Basin size: 55,600 km^{2} (21,500 sq mi)

Basin features
- Progression: Ob→ Kara Sea
- Tributaries
  - right: Agan

The Tromyogan (Russian: Тромъёган) is a river in Khanty-Mansi Autonomous Okrug, Russia, a tributary of the Ob. It is 581 kilometres (361 mi) long, and has a drainage basin of 55,600 square kilometres (21,500 sq mi).

== Course ==
The Tromyogan is a right tributary of the Ob river. It has its sources in the Siberian Uvaly. The river flows to the north of the Vatinsky Yogan basin.

=== Tributaries ===
The main tributary of the Tromyogan is the 544 km (338 mi) long Agan on the right.

== See also ==
- List of rivers of Russia
