= Kolikyogan =

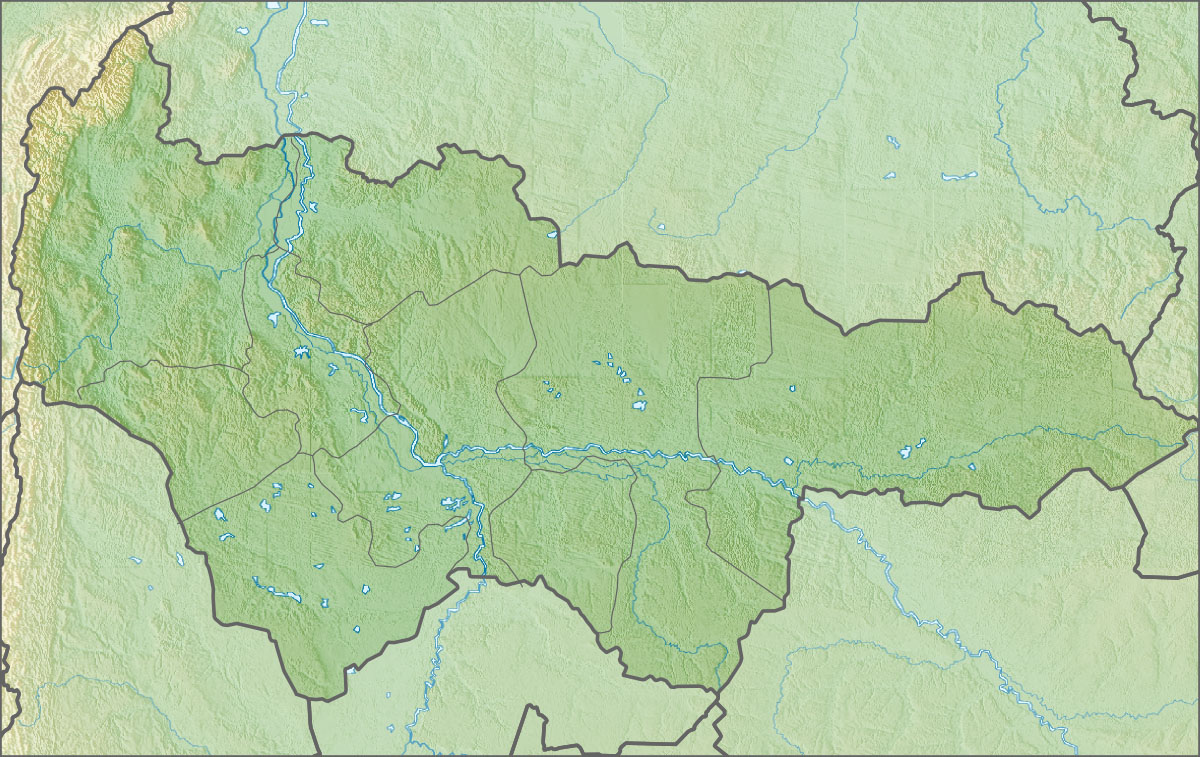
- Mouth location in Khanty-Mansi Autonomous Okrug, Russia

Location
- Country: Russia
- Region: Khanty-Mansi Autonomous Okrug

Physical characteristics
- Source
  - location: Siberian Uvaly
- Mouth: Vakh
  - coordinates: 61.09639°N 78.29444°E
- Length: 457 km (284 mi)
- Basin size: 12,200 km^{2} (4,700 sq mi)

Basin features
- Progression: Vakh→ Ob→ Kara Sea

The Kolikyogan (Russian: Коликъёган, also Колекъёган, often written Kolik"yegan or Kolik'egan) is a river in the Khanty-Mansi Autonomous Okrug of Russia. It is a right-hand tributary of the westward-flowing Vakh, which it enters from the north. It is 457 kilometres (284 mi) long, and has a drainage basin of 12,200 square kilometres (4,700 sq mi).

The interfluvial area between the Kolikyogan and Sabun rivers of the west Siberian lowland is a zone of raised string bogs covering 12,885 square kilometres (4,975 sq mi). It is a status B Ramsar wetland, nominated for designation as a Wetland of International Importance in 2000. The river gives its name to the Verkhae-Kolikyogan oilfield, which has estimated ultimate recovery of 160 million cubic metres (1,008 million barrels) oil and of 120 billion cubic metres (4.2 trillion cubic feet) gas.
