= Khudosey =

River in Russia

Khudosey Худосей
- Mouth location in Yamalo-Nenets Autonomous Okrug, Russia

Physical characteristics
- Mouth: Taz
  - coordinates: 65.6021°N 82.3874°E
- Length: 409 km (254 mi)
- Basin size: 11,200 km^{2} (4,300 sq mi)

Basin features
- Progression: Taz→ Kara Sea

The Khudosey (Russian: Худосей) is a river in the West Siberian Plain, Russia. It is a right tributary of the Taz. It is 409 kilometres (254 mi) long, and has a drainage basin of 11,200 square kilometres (4,300 sq mi).

== Course ==
Its source is in the Yamalo-Nenets Autonomous Okrug and after about 5 km (3.1 mi) downstream it crosses into Krasnoyarsk Krai. It meets the right bank of the Taz 412 km (256 mi) from its mouth in the Taz Estuary of the Kara Sea.

=== Tributaries ===
The main tributaries of the Khudosey are the 114 km (71 mi) long Kashky (Кашкы) and the 113 km (70 mi) long Pokalky (Покалькы) on the right, as well as the 126 km (78 mi) long Limpypitylky (Лимпыпитылькы) on the left. The river is frozen between late October and late May.

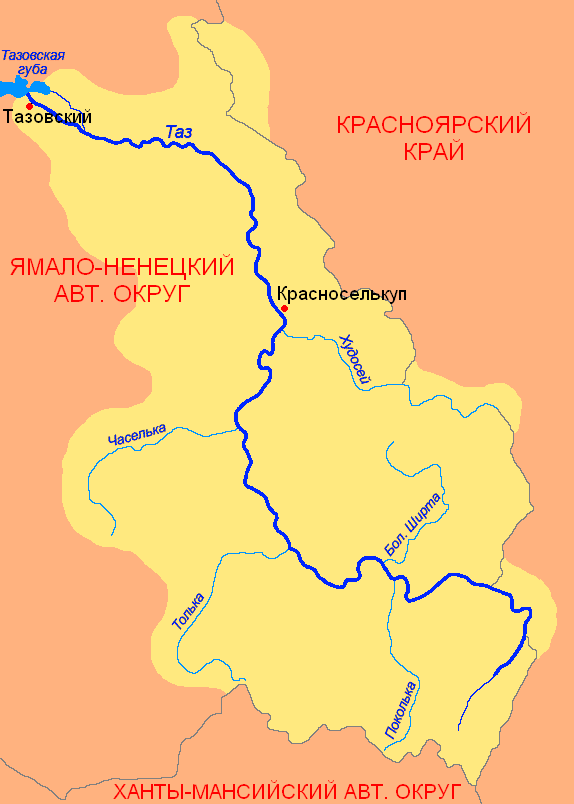
Drainage basin of the Taz River.

== See also ==
- List of rivers of Russia
