= Beloyarsky, Khanty-Mansi Autonomous Okrug =

Beloyarsky Белоярский
- Town
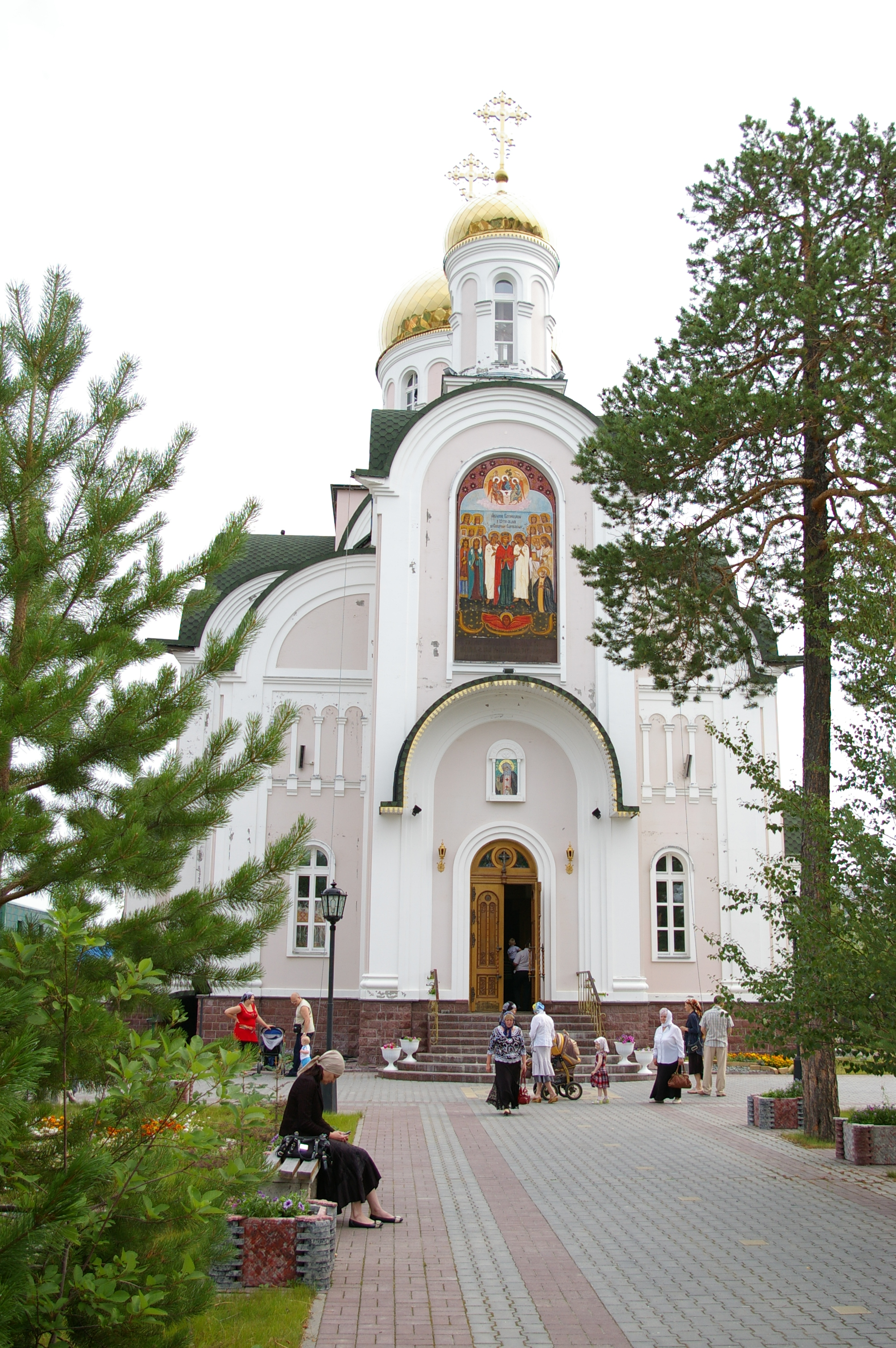

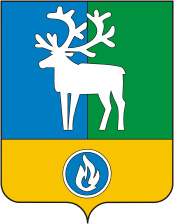
- Coat of arms
- Interactive map of Beloyarsky
- Location of Beloyarsky Beloyarsky (Khanty–Mansi Autonomous Okrug)
- Coordinates: 63°43′N 66°40′E
- Country: Russia
- Federal subject: Khanty-Mansi Autonomous Okrug
- Founded: 1969
- Elevation: 22 m (72 ft)

Population (2010 Census)
  - Total: 20,283
  - Estimate (2021): 19,994 (−1.4%)

Administrative status
  - Subordinated to: town of okrug significance of Beloyarsky
  - Capital of: Beloyarsky District, town of okrug significance of Beloyarsky

Municipal status
  - Municipal district: Beloyarsky Municipal District
  - Urban settlement: Beloyarsky Urban Settlement
  - Capital of: Beloyarsky Municipal District, Beloyarsky Urban Settlement
- Time zone: UTC+5 (MSK+2)
- Postal codes: 628160, 628162, 628163, 628168
- OKTMO ID: 71811151001

Beloyarsky (Russian: Белоя́рский; Khanty: Нуви сӑңхум, Nuvi săŋhum) is a town and the administrative center of Beloyarsky District in Khanty-Mansi Autonomous Okrug, Russia, located on the Kazim River (Ob's tributary), northwest of Khanty-Mansiysk, the administrative center of the autonomous okrug. Population: 20,283 (2010 census); 18,721 (2002 census); 20,534 (1989 Soviet census).

== Administrative and municipal status ==
Within the framework of administrative divisions, it is incorporated as the town of okrug significance of Beloyarsky—an administrative unit with the status equal to that of the districts. As a municipal division, the town of okrug significance of Beloyarsky is incorporated within Beloyarsky Municipal District as Beloyarsky Urban Settlement.

== Geography ==
The town lies in the northern part of the Siberian Uvaly by the banks of the Kazym, a right tributary of the Ob.

== Economy ==
The economy of the town is based on oil and natural gas extraction.
