= Poluy =

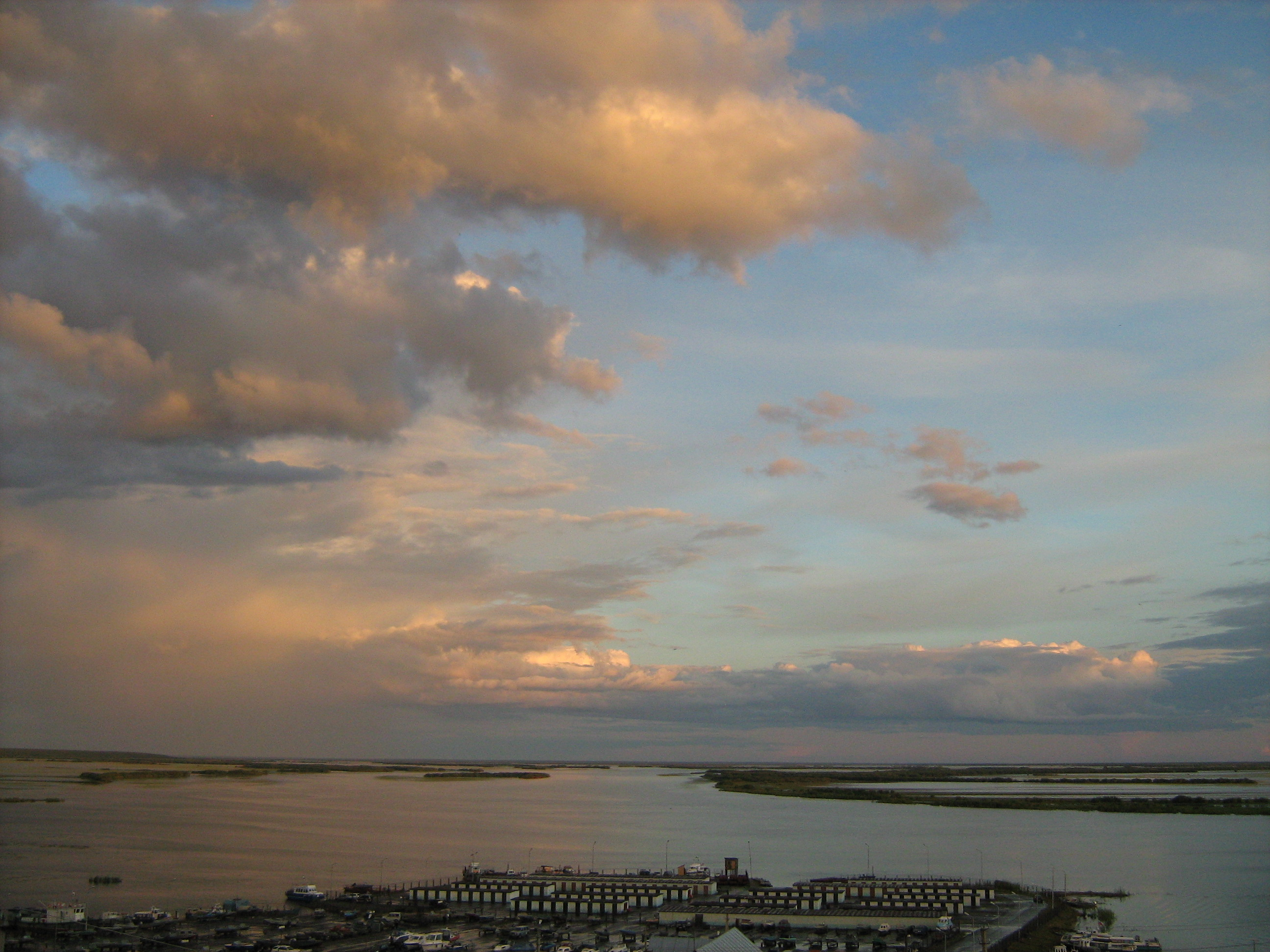

- Mouth location in Yamalo-Nenets Autonomous Okrug, Russia

Location
- Country: Russia

Physical characteristics
- Source
  - location: Siberian Uvaly
- Mouth: Ob
  - coordinates: 66.5583°N 66.5500°E
- Length: 369 km (229 mi)
- Basin size: 21,000 km^{2} (8,100 sq mi)

Basin features
- Progression: Ob→ Kara Sea

The Poluy (Russian: Полуй) is a river in Yamalo-Nenets Autonomous Okrug, Russia, a right tributary of the Ob. It is 369 kilometres (229 mi) long, with a drainage basin of 21,000 square kilometres (8,100 mi^{2}). It flows into the Ob near the city Salekhard.
