= Lake Chyortovo =

Lake in Yamalo-Nenets Autonomous Okrug, Russia

Lake Chyortovo (Lozil-To)
- Чёртово озеро / Лозыль-то
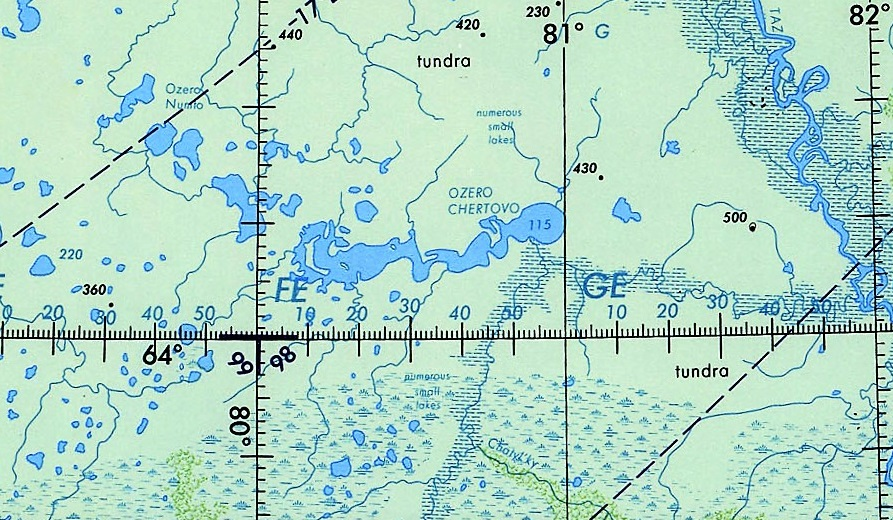
- Chyortovo lake (Lozil-To) ONC map section.

- Location in the Yamalo-Nenets Autonomous Okrug, Russia
- Location: Krasnoselkupsky District
- Coordinates: 64°07′N 80°42′E
- Lake type: Chain of lakes
- Primary inflows: Pokotylky, Marylky, Motylky, Orylky, Kanylky, Kytylky, Sipalky, Tochipylky, Chebakky
- Primary outflows: Tolka
- Basin countries: Russia
- Surface area: 111 square kilometres (43 mi^{2})

Lake Chyortovo or Lozil-To, also known as "Chertovo" (Russian: Чёртово озеро, meaning "Devil's Lake"; Selkup: Лозыль'-то) is a freshwater lake in Yamalo-Nenets Autonomous Okrug, Russia.

The lake is a traditional sacred site for the indigenous Selkup people of the region. Legend says the lake is so deep it has no bottom.

== Geography ==
Chyortovo is located north of the Arctic Circle, in the southeastern part of the okrug. It is a chain of lakes roughly aligned from west to east. They are connected with each other by streams. The westernmost one at 64°12′N 79°55′W is known as "Upper Chyortovo". It has an hourglass shape and an island in the northern part. The largest lake is at the eastern end. The lakes' outflow is the Tolka, a left tributary of the Taz, which flows very close to the east.

A number of rivers flow into the lake, such as the 106 kilometres (66 mi) long Pokotylky, the 30 kilometres (19 mi) long Motylky, the 27 kilometres (17 mi) long Orylky, the 91 kilometres (57 mi) long Marylky, the 42 kilometres (26 mi) long Kytylky, the 131 kilometres (81 mi) long Kanylky, the 11 kilometres (6.8 mi) long Sipalky, the 36 kilometres (22 mi) long Chebakky and the 34 kilometres (21 mi) long Tochipylky, among others.

== Fauna ==
Among the fish species found in the lake, the tugun (Coregonus tugun) is much appreciated.

== See also ==
- Chain of lakes
- List of lakes of Russia
