= Siberian Uvaly =

Hilly region in the central part of the West Siberian Plain, Russia

- Сибирские Увалы
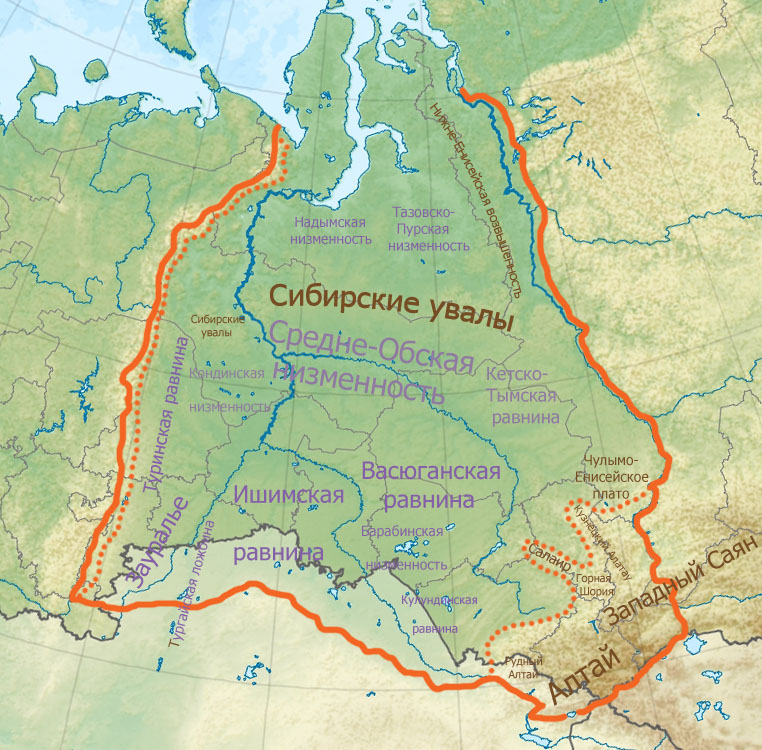
- Location of the Siberian Uvaly in the West Siberian Plain

Highest point
- Peak: Unnamed
- Elevation: 285 m (935 ft)
- Coordinates: 63°18′53″N 82°19′50″E

Dimensions
- Length: 900 km (560 mi) W/E
- Width: 100 km (62 mi) N/S

Geography
- Location within Russia
- Location: Khanty-Mansi Autonomous Okrug, Yamalo-Nenets Autonomous Okrug, Russia
- Range coordinates: 63°0′N 75°0′E
- Parent range: West Siberian Plain

Siberian Uvaly (Russian: Сибирские Увалы) is a hilly region in the central part of the West Siberian Plain, Russia.

A 631,308 hectares (1,560,000 acres) sector of the hills is a protected area under the name Upper Taz Nature Reserve, which was established in December 1986. The area is sparsely populated. Only a few settlements, such as Beloyarsky town, are located in the Siberian Uvaly.

== Geography ==
The hilly area falls within the Khanty-Mansi and Yamalo-Nenets Autonomous Okrugs of Tyumen Oblast. It extends roughly from west to east between the Ob and the basin of the Yeloguy river, a tributary of the Yenisei. The Central Ob Lowland (Средне-Обская низменность) stretches to the south and the Nadym and Taz lowlands to the north. The Uvaly form a drainage divide between the right tributaries of the Ob and the upper course of the Kazym, Nadym, Pur and Taz river basins.

The word "Uval" (Russian: Увал) refers to an elongated hill with a flat, slightly convex or wavy top and gentle slopes. The hills are low and have a smooth profile and include waterlogged basins in between, such as the central part, which is the lowest, having an almost flat relief. The highest point of the Siberian Uvaly is an unnamed 285 metres (935 ft) high summit located in the Krasnoselkupsky District of the Yamalo-Nenets Autonomous Okrug.

=== Hydrography ===
Numerous rivers have their source in the area, such as the Vatinsky Yogan, Tromyogan, Poluy, Amnya, Pim, Kolikyogan and Lyamin of the Ob basin, the Yerkalnadeypur and Ayvasedapur of the Pur basin, as well as the Tolka of the Taz basin. Some of the flat areas of the Siberian Uvaly have numerous, mostly small, thermokarst lakes, but there are also some large ones, such as Numto.

== Flora ==
In the western and eastern sections of the Siberian Uvaly, spruce, larch, and pine taiga predominates. In the lower central part, there is sparse larch taiga interspersed with swamps.

== See also ==
- List of mountains and hills of Russia
