= Beloyarsky District, Khanty-Mansi Autonomous Okrug =

Beloyarsky District Белоярский район (Russian)
- District
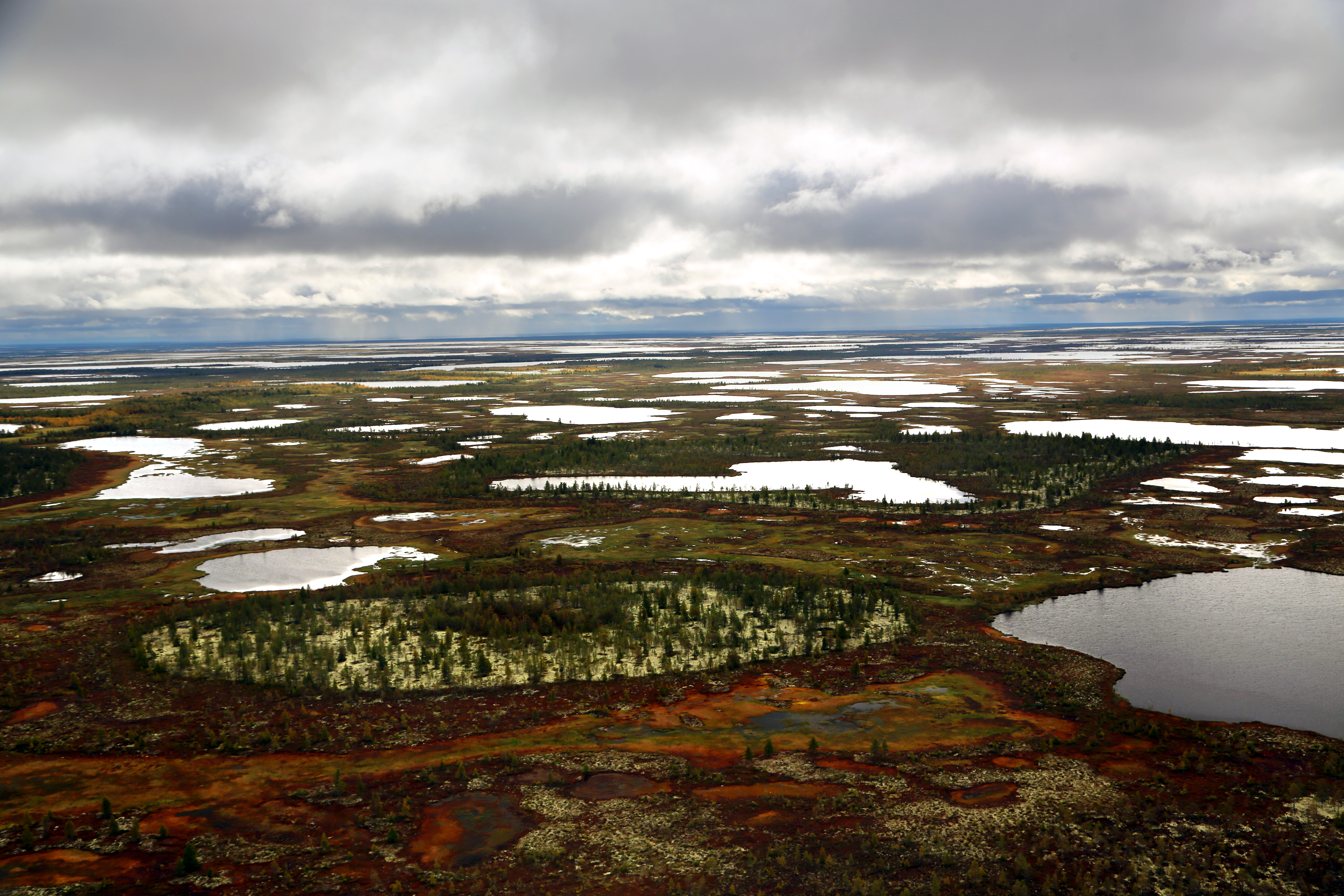
- Numto Nature Park in Beloyarsky District

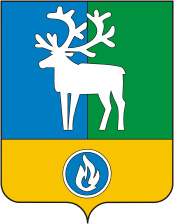
- Coat of arms
- Location of Beloyarsky District in Khanty-Mansi Autonomous Okrug
- Coordinates: 63°43′N 66°40′E
- Country: Russia
- Federal subject: Khanty-Mansi Autonomous Okrug
- Established: 1988
- Administrative center: Beloyarsky

Area
  - Total: 41,574 km^{2} (16,052 sq mi)

Population (2010 Census)
  - Total: 9,766
  - Density: 0.2349/km^{2} (0.6084/sq mi)
  - Urban: 0%
  - Rural: 100%

Administrative structure
  - Inhabited localities: 11 rural localities

Municipal structure
  - Municipally incorporated as: Beloyarsky Municipal District
  - Municipal divisions: 1 urban settlements, 6 rural settlements
- Time zone: UTC+5 (MSK+2)
- OKTMO ID: 71811000
- Website: http://www.admbel.ru/

Beloyarsky District (Russian: Белоя́рский райо́н) is an administrative and municipal district (raion), one of the nine in Khanty-Mansi Autonomous Okrug of Tyumen Oblast, Russia. It is located in the north of the autonomous okrug. The area of the district is 41,574 square kilometers (16,052 sq mi). Its administrative center is the town of Beloyarsky (which is not administratively a part of the district). Population: 9,766 (2010 Census); 9,493 (2002 census); 8,927 (1989 Soviet census).

== Administrative and municipal status ==
Within the framework of administrative divisions, Beloyarsky District is one of the nine in the autonomous okrug. The town of Beloyarsky serves as its administrative center, despite being incorporated separately as a town of okrug significance—an administrative unit with the status equal to that of the districts.

As a municipal division, the district is incorporated as Beloyarsky Municipal District, with the town of okrug significance of Beloyarsky being incorporated within it as Beloyarsky Urban Settlement.

== Geography ==
Lake Numto, a sacred place for the Khanty, is located in the district. The adjacent wetlands and the lake are part of an integrated 597,189.5 hectares (1,475,687 acres) protected area which was established in 1997.

== Demographics ==
Ethnic composition (2021):

- Russians – 67.7%
- Khanty – 10.5%
- Ukrainians – 4.4%
- Tatars – 4.4%
- Bashkirs – 1.6%
- Kumyks – 1.2%
- Kyrgyz – 1.0%
- Mansi – 1.0%
- Others – 8.2%

== See also ==
- Siberian Uvaly
