= Vatinsky Yogan =

River in Siberia, Russia

Vatinsky Yogan Ватинский Ёган
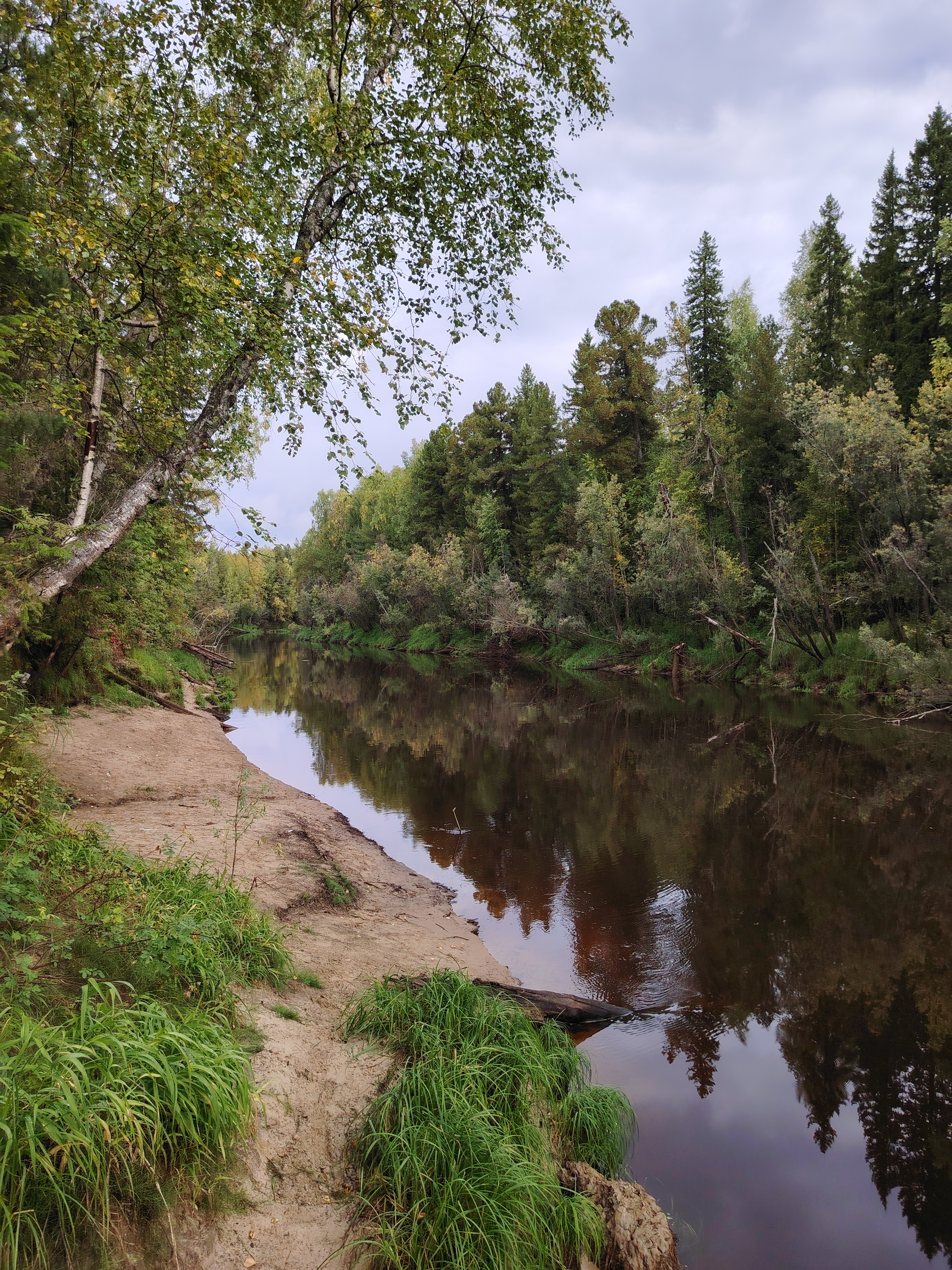

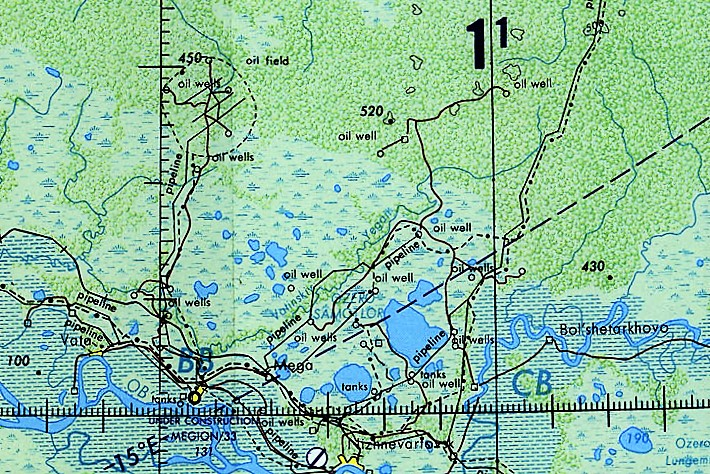
- Course of the Vatinsky Yogan ONC map section

Location
- Country: Russia

Physical characteristics
- Source: Agansky Yuval, Siberian Uvaly
  - coordinates: 61°29′15″N 77°00′39″E
  - elevation: 98 m (322 ft)
- Mouth: Ob
  - location: Near Langepas
  - coordinates: 61°08′21″N 75°14′59″E
  - elevation: 22 m (72 ft)
- Length: 593 km (368 mi)
- Basin size: 3,190 km^{2} (1,230 sq mi)

Basin features
- Progression: Ob→ Kara Sea

The Vatinsky Yogan (Russian: Ватинский Ёган) is a river in Khanty-Mansi Autonomous Okrug, Russia. The river is 593 kilometres (368 mi) long and has a catchment area of 3,190 square kilometres (1,230 sq mi).

The Vatinsky Yogan flows across the Central Siberian Plateau. Its basin is located in the Nizhnevartovsky District. Except for Vysoky there are no permanent settlements along the course of the river, but there are important oil and gas deposits.

== Course ==
The Vatinsky Yogan is a right tributary of the Ob river. It has its sources in the southern slopes of the Agansky Yuval, a low hilly area of the Siberian Uvaly. The river flows slowly among swamps south of the Tromyogan basin in an area of numerous small lakes. To the southeast lies the basin of the Vakh river. The Vatinsky Yogan heads generally in a western and southwestern direction and in its lower course it bends and flows for a stretch in a roughly WNW direction parallel to the Ob. Finally it meets the right bank of the Ob 1,600 km (990 mi) from its mouth. The channel of the river is so convoluted and has so many twists and bends, that even though the river is almost 600 km (370 mi) long, the distance between its source and its mouth in a straight line is barely 100 km (62 mi).

The Langepas - Nizhnevartovsk railway line passes along the river valley in its lower reaches.

=== Tributaries ===
The main tributary of the Vatinsky Yogan is the 87 km (54 mi) long Kyrtyp-Yakh (Кыртып-Ях) on the right. The river is fed mainly by snow and is frozen between October and May.

== Flora ==
Swampy taiga predominates in the basin of the river.

== See also ==
- List of rivers of Russia
