= Krasnoselkup =

Krasnoselkup Красноселькуп
- Selo
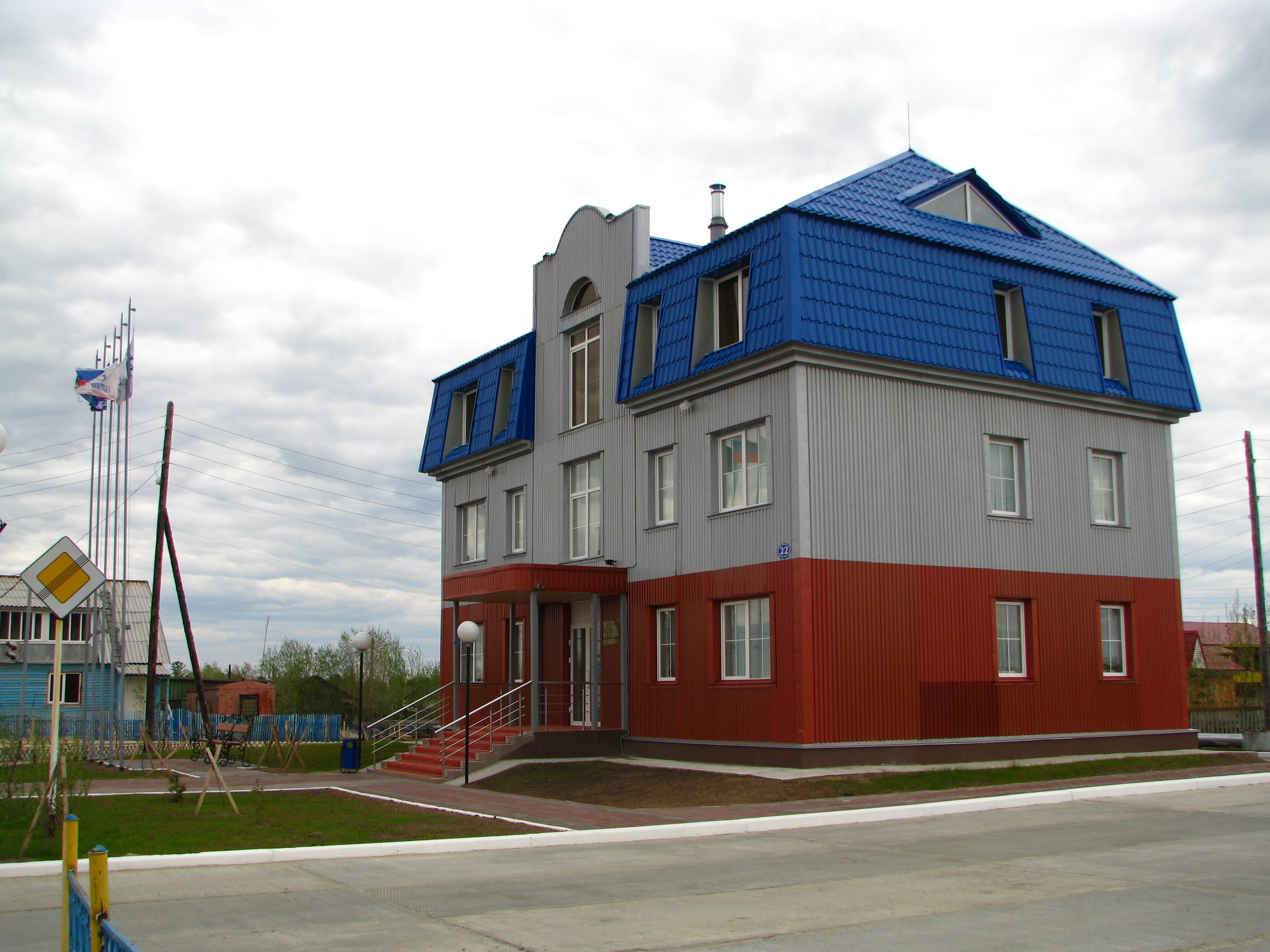

- Flag
- Interactive map of Krasnoselkup
- Location of Krasnoselkup Krasnoselkup (Yamalo-Nenets Autonomous Okrug)
- Coordinates: 65°42′20″N 82°27′36″E
- Country: Russia
- Federal subject: Yamalo-Nenets Autonomous Okrug
- Administrative district: Krasnoselkupsky District
- Founded: 1937

Population (2010 Census)
  - Total: 3,974
  - Estimate (2021): 3,732 (−6.1%)

Administrative status
  - Capital of: Krasnoselkupsky District
- Time zone: UTC+5 (MSK+2)
- Postal code: 629380
- OKTMO ID: 71933000101

Krasnoselkup (Russian: Красноселькуп) is a rural locality (a selo) and the administrative center of Krasnoselkupsky District of Yamalo-Nenets Autonomous Okrug, Russia. Population: 3,974 (2010 census); 4,014 (2002 census); 5,300 (1989 Soviet census).

== History ==
Krasnoselkup was founded in 1933 on the site of the Selkup camp Nyaryi Mache (Ньярыль Мач). Translated from Selkup, this means "swampy, tundra forest".

In 2006, a school for 500 pupils was built.
