= Kazym =

Kazym Казым
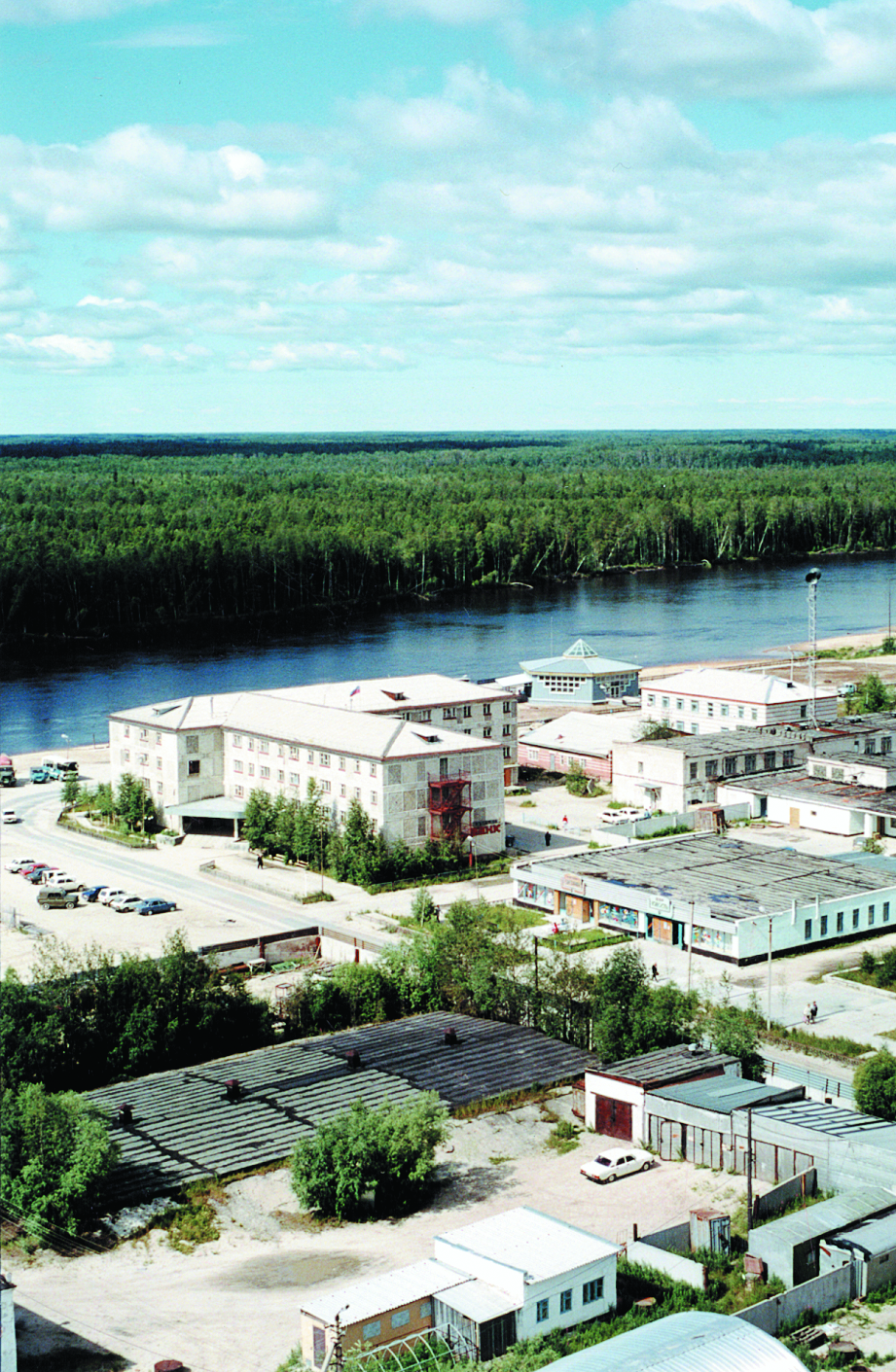
- The Kazym by Beloyarsky

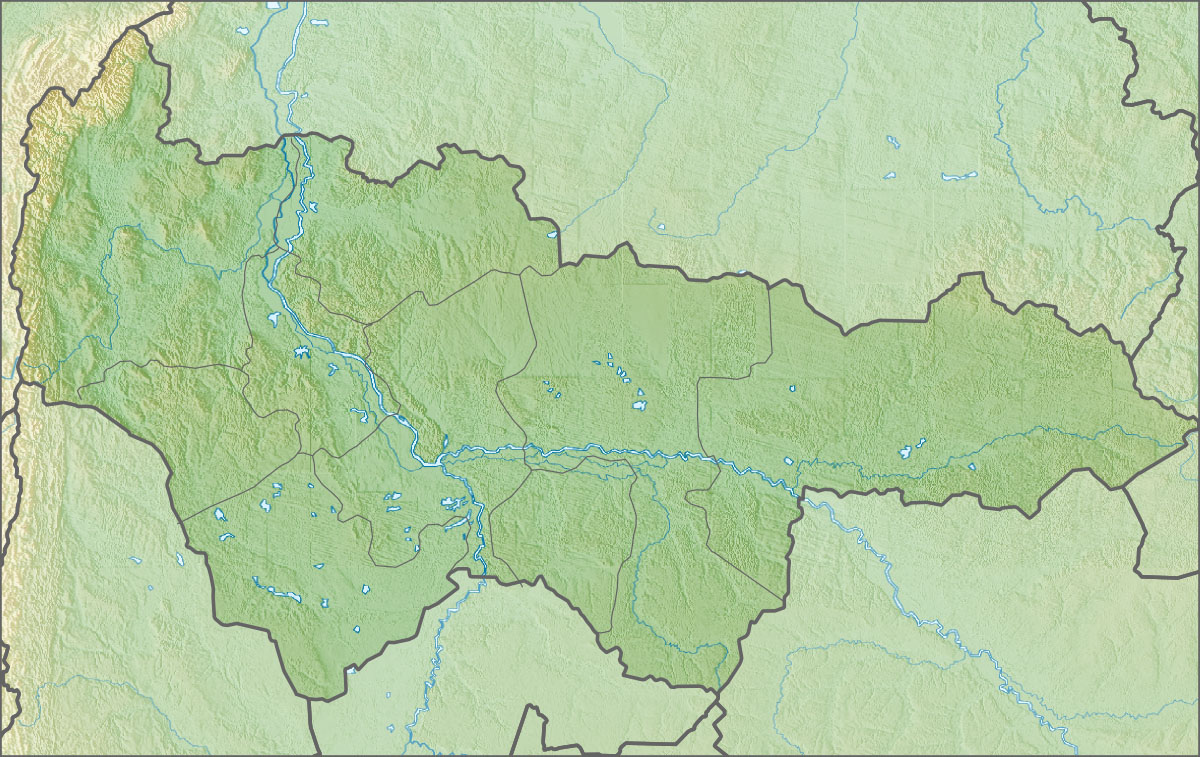
- Mouth location in Khanty-Mansi Autonomous Okrug, Russia

Location
- Country: Russia

Physical characteristics
- Source: Siberian Uvaly
- Mouth: Ob
  - coordinates: 63.8958°N 65.8569°E
- Length: 659 km (409 mi)
- Basin size: 35,600 km^{2} (13,700 sq mi)

Basin features
- Progression: Ob→ Kara Sea

The Kazym (Russian: Казы́м) is a river in Beloyarsky District, Khanty-Mansi Autonomous Okrug, Russia. It is 659 kilometres (409 mi) long, with a drainage basin of 35,600 square kilometres (13,700 mi^{2}). Its average discharge is 267 cubic metres per second (9,400 cu ft/s).

The town of Beloyarsky is along the Kazym.

== Course ==
The Kazym is a right tributary of the Ob. Its sources are in the Siberian Uvaly. It flows through the northern part of the West Siberian Plain meandering across a very swampy valley. There are numerous lakes in its basin, including the relatively large Sorum-Lor and the Saran-Kho-Lor. The Kazym river is fed mainly by snow. It freezes in early November and begins to thaw in late May.

=== Tributaries ===
The main tributaries of the Kazym are the 374 km (232 mi) long Amnya, the 285 km (177 mi) long Lykhn and the 156 km (97 mi) long Pomut on the left, as well as the 190 km (120 mi) long Sorum on the right.

== See also ==
- List of rivers of Russia
