= Tolka (Taz) =

River in Yamalo-Nenets Autonomous Okrug, Russia

Tolka Толька / Толь-кы
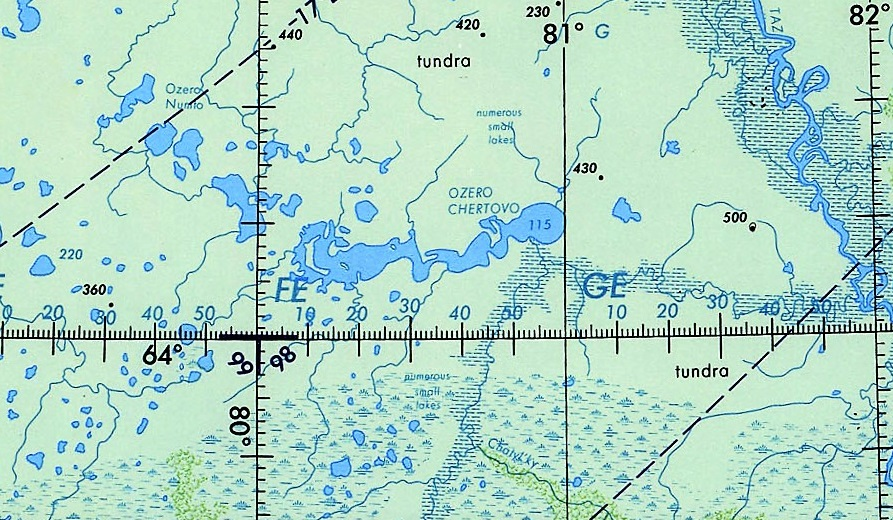
- Lower course of the Tolka ONC map section

- Mouth location in Yamalo-Nenets Autonomous Okrug, Russia

Location
- Country: Russia

Physical characteristics
- Source
  - location: Siberian Uvaly
  - coordinates: 63°12′44″N 80°48′39″E
  - elevation: 138 metres (453 ft)
- Mouth: Taz
  - coordinates: 64°02′52″N 81°56′46″E
  - elevation: 25 metres (82 ft)
- Length: 391 km (243 mi)
- Basin size: 13,300 km^{2} (5,100 sq mi)
- Discharge
  - average: 125 m^{3}/s (4,400 cu ft/s)

Basin features
- Progression: Taz → Kara Sea

The Tolka (Russian: Толька; Selkup: Толь-кы) is a river in the Yamalo-Nenets Autonomous Okrug, Russia. It has a length of 391 kilometres (243 mi) and a drainage basin area of 13,300 square kilometres (5,100 mi^{2}).

The river flows north of the Arctic Circle, across territories of the Krasnoselkupsky District marked by permafrost and swamps.

== Course ==
The Tolka is one of the main tributaries of the Taz. It is formed in the Siberian Uvaly hills, at the confluence of rivers Ai-Emtoryogan and Pyantymyogan. In its upper course the river heads roughly westwards across the tundra. After a long stretch it bends and meanders in a northeastern direction. Finally, south of the shore of lake Lake Chyortovo (Lozil-To), it bends eastwards, meandering until it meets the left bank of the Taz 723 km (449 mi) from its mouth in the Taz Estuary of the Kara Sea.

=== Tributaries ===
The main tributaries of the Tolka are the 141 km (88 mi) long Varky-Chyuelky (Варкы-Чюэлькы) and the 141 km (88 mi) long Kypa-Kelilky (Кыпа-Кэлилькы) on the left. There are numerous lakes and swamps in its basin, the largest of which are lakes Chyortovo and Pyurmato. The river is frozen between mid October and mid May.

== See also ==
- List of rivers of Russia
