= Taz (river) =

River located in western Siberia

Taz Таз
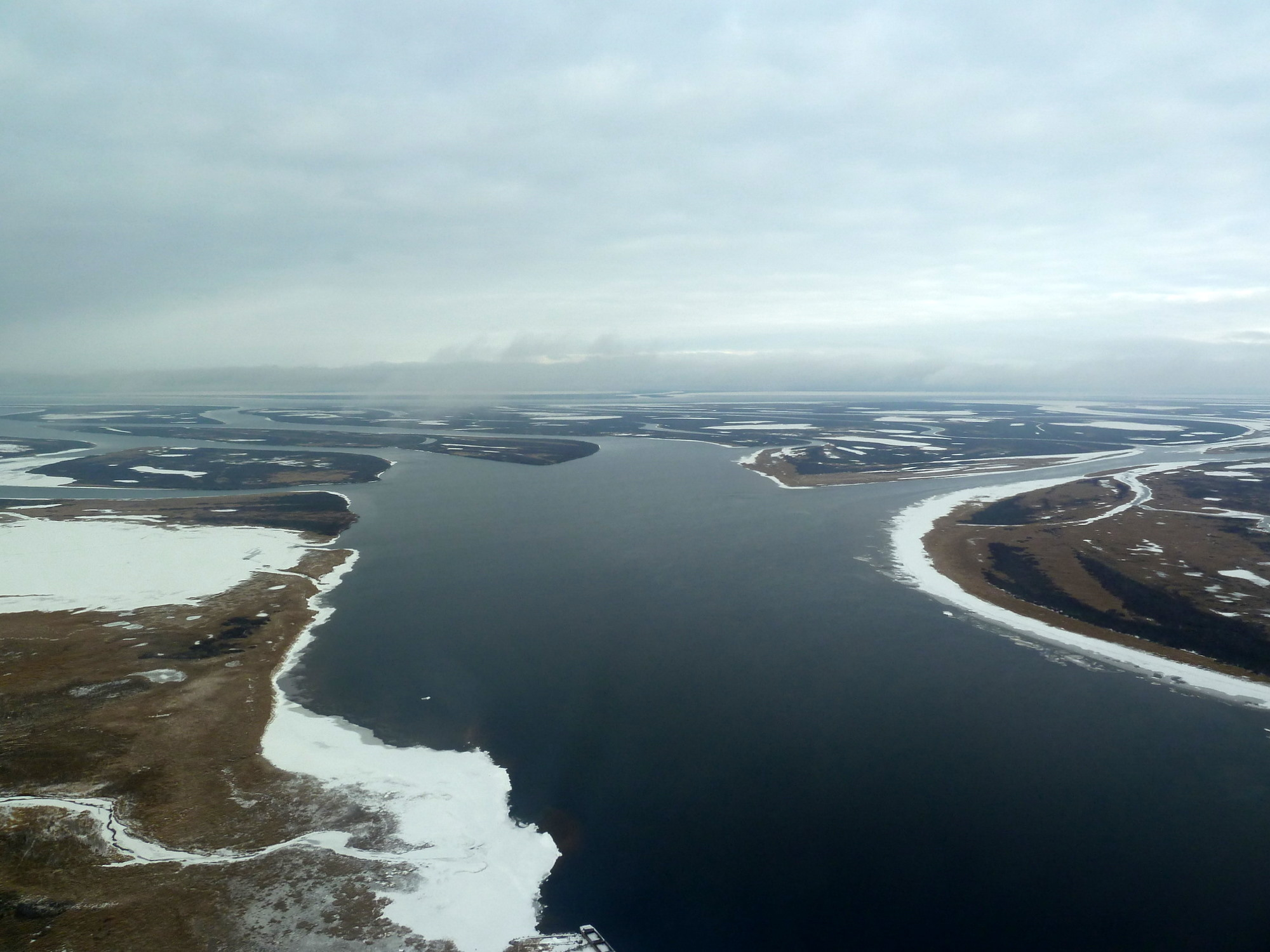

- Mouth location in the Yamalo-Nenets Autonomous Okrug, Russia

Location
- Country: Yamalo-Nenets Autonomous Okrug, Russia

Physical characteristics
- Source
  - location: Siberian Uvaly
  - coordinates: 62°37′6″N 84°09′51″E
  - elevation: 139 m (456 ft)
- Mouth
  - location: Taz Estuary
  - coordinates: 67.5794°N 78.1595°E
  - elevation: 0 m (0 ft)
- Length: 1,401 km (871 mi)
- Basin size: 150,000 km^{2} (58,000 sq mi)
- Discharge
  - average: 1,450 m^{3}/s (51,000 cu ft/s)

The Taz (Russian: Таз) is a river located in western Siberia, has a length of 1,401 kilometers (871 mi) and drains a basin estimated at 150,000 square kilometers (58,000 sq mi). Its middle and lower course are located within Yamalo-Nenets Autonomous Okrug, while its upper course borders with Krasnoyarsk Krai.

The now ruined city of Mangazeya was located by the Taz.

== Course ==
The Taz begins near Lake Dynda, Siberian Uvaly, a hilly area of the West Siberian Plain. It flows roughly northwestwards across largely uninhabited areas. Its mouth is in the Taz Estuary, a roughly 250-kilometer (160 mi) long estuary that begins in the area of the settlement of Tazovsky and ends in the Gulf of Ob. A portage connects the Taz with the Turukhan and the Yenisey. There are numerous lakes in its basin, such as the Chyortovo.

Its major tributaries include the Bolshaya Shirta and Khudosey from the right and the Tolka and Chaselka from the left.

Drainage basin of the Taz River. It flows into the Taz Estuary which is the large eastern arm of the Gulf of Ob.

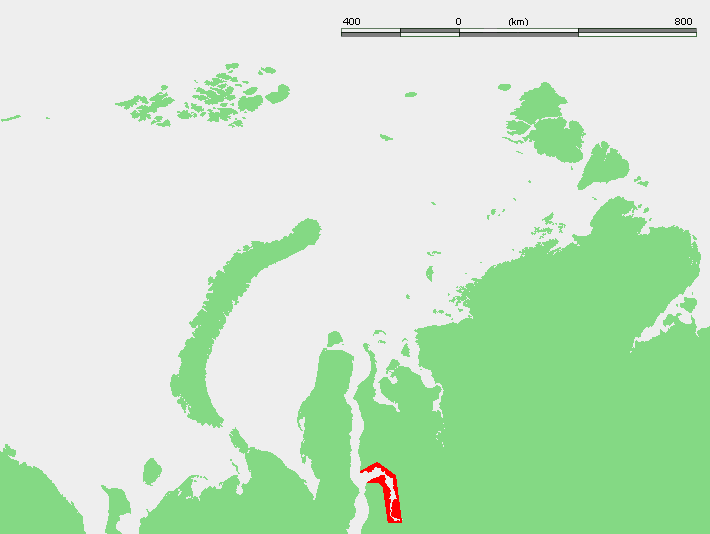
Location of the Taz estuary within Siberia.

== See also ==
- List of rivers of Russia
- Upper Taz Nature Reserve
