= Krasnoselkupsky District =

Krasnoselkupsky District Красноселькупский район (Russian)
- District

Other transcription(s)
  - Selkup: Нярӄый щёй ӄумый район
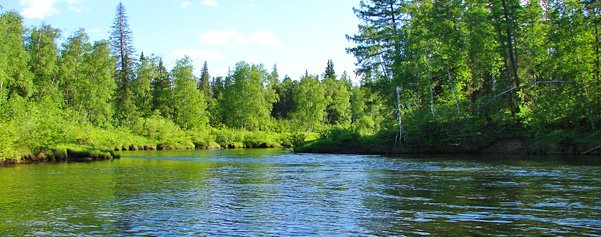
- Upper Taz Reserve

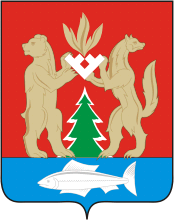
- Flag Coat of arms
- Location of Krasnoselkupsky District in Yamalo-Nenets Autonomous Okrug
- Coordinates: 65°42′20″N 82°27′36″E
- Country: Russia
- Federal subject: Yamalo-Nenets Autonomous Okrug
- Administrative center: Krasnoselkup

Area
  - Total: 106,270 km^{2} (41,030 sq mi)

Population (2010 Census)
  - Total: 6,204
  - Density: 0.05838/km^{2} (0.1512/sq mi)
  - Urban: 0%
  - Rural: 100%

Administrative structure
  - Inhabited localities: 4 rural localities

Municipal structure
  - Municipally incorporated as: Krasnoselkupsky Municipal District
  - Municipal divisions: 0 urban settlements, 3 rural settlements
- Time zone: UTC+5 (MSK+2)
- OKTMO ID: 71913000
- Website: http://www.selkup-adm.ru/

Krasnoselkupsky District (Russian: Красносельку́пский райо́н, Selkup: Нярӄый щёй ӄумый район) is an administrative and municipal district (raion), one of the seven in Yamalo-Nenets Autonomous Okrug of Tyumen Oblast, Russia. It is located in the southeast of the autonomous okrug. The area of the district is 106,270 square kilometers (41,030 sq mi). Its administrative center is the rural locality (a selo) of Krasnoselkup. Population: 6,204 (2010 Census); 6,384 (2002 census); 7,940 (1989 Soviet census). The population of Krasnoselkup accounts for 64.1% of the district's total population.

== Geography ==
Lake Chyortovo, a chain of lakes, is located in the district. The Taz and its tributary the Toka are the main rivers.

== Demographics ==
Ethnic composition (2021):

- Russians – 54.8%
- Selkups – 25.2%
- Tatars – 3.2%
- Ukrainians – 3.1%
- Nenets – 1.3%
- Bashkirs – 1.2%
- Mordvins – 1.1%
- Azerbaijanis – 1.0%
- Others – 6%
