= Murya =

Murya can refer to:

- Murya, Azerbaijan, a village and municipality in the Lerik Rayon of Azerbaijan
- Murya, Russia, a selo in Saldykelsky Rural Okrug of Lensky District in the Sakha Republic
