= Khamra =

Khamra Хамра
- Selo
- Interactive map of Khamra
- Location of Khamra Khamra (Sakha Republic)
- Coordinates: 60°13′N 114°07′E
- Country: Russia
- Federal subject: Sakha Republic
- Administrative district: Lensky District
- Rural okrugSelsoviet: Yaroslavsky Rural Okrug
- Elevation: 205 m (673 ft)

Population
  - Estimate (2002): 182 )

Municipal status
  - Municipal district: Lensky Municipal District
  - Rural settlement: Yaroslavsky Rural Settlement
- Time zone: UTC+
- Postal code: 678159
- OKTMO ID: 98627449106

Khamra (Russian: Хамра; Yakut: Хамра, Xamra) is a rural locality (a selo) in Yaroslavsky Rural Okrug of Lensky District in the Sakha Republic, Russia, located 85 kilometers (53 mi) from Lensk, the administrative center of the district, and 18 kilometers (11 mi) from Yaroslavsky, the administrative center of the rural okrug. Its population as of the 2002 Census was 182.
