= Alysardakh =

Alysardakh (Russian: Алысардах) is the name of several rural localities in the Sakha Republic, Russia:

- Alysardakh, Lensky District, Sakha Republic, a selo in Tolonsky Rural Okrug of Lensky District
- Alysardakh, Verkhoyansky District, Sakha Republic, a selo in Adychchinsky Rural Okrug of Verkhoyansky District
