= Nyuya Severnaya =

Nyuya Severnaya Нюя Северная
- Selo
- Interactive map of Nyuya Severnaya
- Location of Nyuya Severnaya Nyuya Severnaya (Sakha Republic)
- Coordinates: 60°54′06″N 114°49′54″E
- Country: Russia
- Federal subject: Sakha Republic
- Administrative district: Lensky District
- Rural okrugSelsoviet: Murbaysky Rural Okrug

Population
  - Estimate (2002): 168 )

Municipal status
  - Municipal district: Lensky Municipal District
  - Rural settlement: Murbaysky Rural Settlement
- Time zone: UTC+
- Postal code: 678165
- OKTMO ID: 98627420101

Nyuya Severnaya (Russian: Нюя Северная; Yakut: Хотугу Ньүүйэ, romanized: Xotugu Ņüüye) is a rural locality (a selo), one of two settlements, in addition to Dorozhny, the administrative centre of the Rural Okrug, in Murbaysky Rural Okrug of Lensky District in the Sakha Republic, Russia. Its population as of the 2002 Census was 168.

== Geography ==
Nyuya Severnaya is located in the Lena Plateau, 25 kilometers (16 mi) from the district centre Lensk. It lies on the left bank of the Nyuya River, near its confluence with its longest tributary the Ulakhan-Murbayy (Улахан-Мурбайы).
