= Chamcha =

Chamcha Чамча
- Selo
- Interactive map of Chamcha
- Location of Chamcha Chamcha (Sakha Republic)
- Coordinates: 60°51′N 114°43′E
- Country: Russia
- Federal subject: Sakha Republic
- Administrative district: Lensky District
- Rural okrugSelsoviet: Orto-Nakharinsky Rural Okrug
- Elevation: 193 m (633 ft)

Population
  - Estimate (2002): 355 )

Municipal status
  - Municipal district: Lensky Municipal District
  - Rural settlement: Orto-Nakharinsky Rural Settlement
- Time zone: UTC+
- Postal code: 678167
- OKTMO ID: 98627433106

Chamcha (Russian: Чамча; Yakut: Чамча, Çamça) is a rural locality (a selo) in Orto-Nakharinsky Rural Okrug of Lensky District in the Sakha Republic, Russia, located 37 kilometers (23 mi) from Lensk, the administrative center of the district, and 30 kilometers (19 mi) from Orto-Nakhara, the administrative center of the rural okrug. Its population as of the 2002 Census was 355.
