= Nyuya =

Nyuya Нюя
- Selo
- Interactive map of Nyuya
- Location of Nyuya Nyuya (Sakha Republic)
- Coordinates: 60°32′08″N 116°12′46″E
- Country: Russia
- Federal subject: Sakha Republic
- Administrative district: Lensky District
- Rural okrugSelsoviet: Nyuysky Rural Okrug
- Elevation: 167 m (548 ft)

Population
  - Estimate (2002): 1,276 )

Administrative status
  - Capital of: Nyuysky Rural Okrug

Municipal status
  - Municipal district: Lensky Municipal District
  - Rural settlement: Nyuysky Rural Settlement
  - Capital of: Nyuysky Rural Settlement
- Time zone: UTC+
- Postal code: 678162
- OKTMO ID: 98627430101

Nyuya (Russian: Нюя; Yakut: Ньүүйэ, Ñüüye) is a rural locality (a selo), the administrative centre of and one of two settlements, in addition to Turukta, in Nyuysky Rural Okrug of Lensky District in the Sakha Republic, Russia. It is located 95 kilometers (59 mi) from Lensk, the administrative center of the district. Its population as of the 2002 Census was 1,276.

== Geography ==
Nyuya is located around 90 km south-east of the district centre Lensk, on the left bank of the Lena River near its confluence with its tributary the Nyuya.

== Economy and infrastructure ==
Nyuya and the neighbouring village Turukta, 18 km downstream on the Lena, were timber production centres during the Soviet era. The timber company was privatised in 1992, however it later went bankrupt.

The village has a river port. Road access is only reliable in winter, when the frozen river allows a winter road to Lensk.

== Climate ==
Climate data for Nyuya
Month	Jan	Feb	Mar	Apr	May	Jun	Jul	Aug	Sep	Oct	Nov	Dec	Year
Record high °C (°F)	−1.1 (30.0)	−2.2 (28.0)	10.0 (50.0)	20.0 (68.0)	27.2 (81.0)	35.0 (95.0)	33.9 (93.0)	33.9 (93.0)	25.0 (77.0)	17.8 (64.0)	4.0 (39.2)	2.2 (36.0)	35.0 (95.0)
Mean daily maximum °C (°F)	−26.1 (−15.0)	−22.7 (−8.9)	−9.8 (14.4)	2.0 (35.6)	12.0 (53.6)	21.0 (69.8)	24.1 (75.4)	20.3 (68.5)	12.2 (54.0)	−0.4 (31.3)	−15.4 (4.3)	−24.1 (−11.4)	−1.1 (30.0)
Daily mean °C (°F)	−29.9 (−21.8)	−27.8 (−18.0)	−17.0 (1.4)	−3.9 (25.0)	6.7 (44.1)	15.0 (59.0)	18.0 (64.4)	14.5 (58.1)	6.9 (44.4)	−4.2 (24.4)	−19.3 (−2.7)	−28.0 (−18.4)	−6.2 (20.8)
Mean daily minimum °C (°F)	−34.5 (−30.1)	−33.7 (−28.7)	−25.0 (−13.0)	−11.2 (11.8)	0.3 (32.5)	8.0 (46.4)	11.1 (52.0)	8.4 (47.1)	2.1 (35.8)	−8.4 (16.9)	−23.5 (−10.3)	−32.6 (−26.7)	−12.0 (10.4)
Record low °C (°F)	−52.8 (−63.0)	−53.9 (−65.0)	−48.9 (−56.0)	−30.0 (−22.0)	−11.1 (12.0)	−3.9 (25.0)	1.1 (34.0)	−4.0 (24.8)	−13.9 (7.0)	−31.1 (−24.0)	−48.9 (−56.0)	−56.1 (−69.0)	−56.1 (−69.0)
Average precipitation mm (inches)	15.5 (0.61)	34.7 (1.37)	18.8 (0.74)	33.7 (1.33)	44.4 (1.75)	34.2 (1.35)	33.5 (1.32)	34.9 (1.37)	25.7 (1.01)	38.6 (1.52)	47.6 (1.87)	29.2 (1.15)	391.5 (15.41)
