= Tolon, Lensky District, Sakha Republic =

Tolon Толон
- Selo
- Interactive map of Tolon
- Location of Tolon Tolon (Sakha Republic)
- Coordinates: 59°27′30″N 111°32′50″E
- Country: Russia
- Federal subject: Sakha Republic
- Administrative district: Lensky District
- Rural okrugSelsoviet: Tolonsky Rural Okrug
- Elevation: 252 m (827 ft)

Population
  - Estimate (2002): 250 )

Administrative status
  - Capital of: Tolonsky Rural Okrug

Municipal status
  - Municipal district: Lensky Municipal District
  - Rural settlement: Tolonsky Rural Settlement
  - Capital of: Tolonsky Rural Settlement
- Time zone: UTC+
- Postal code: 678154
- OKTMO ID: 98627440101

Tolon (Russian: Толон; Yakut: Толоон, Toloon) is a rural locality (a selo), the administrative centre of and one of three settlements, in addition to Alysardakh and Innyaly, in Tolonsky Rural Okrug of Lensky District in the Sakha Republic, Russia. Its population as of the 2002 Census was 250.

== Geography ==
The village is located in the Lena Plateau, on the left bank of the Peleduy river, 306 kilometers (190 mi) from Lensk, the administrative center of the district.
