= Talakan Airport =

Airport in Sakha Republic, Russia

Talakan Airport Талакан Аэропорт Talakan Aeroport
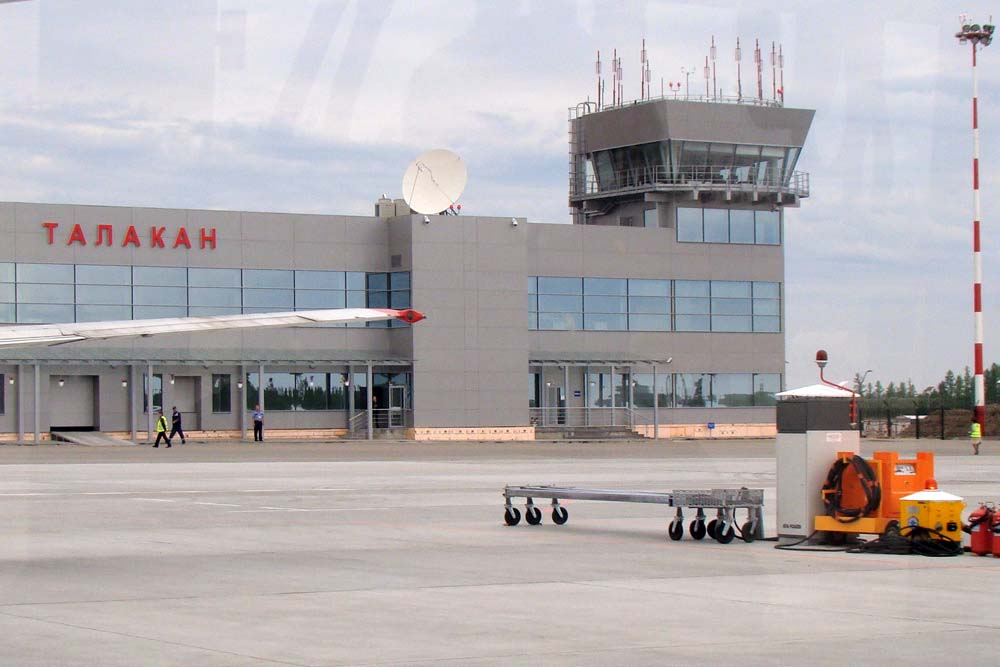
- IATA: TLK; ICAO: UECT; LID: ТЛК

Summary
- Airport type: Public
- Owner: Surgutneftegas
- Location: Lensky District; Sakha Republic; Russia
- Opened: 2012
- Time zone: +9 (UTC+9:00)
- Elevation AMSL: 1,329 ft / 405 m
- Coordinates: 59°52′35″N 111°02′40″E
- Website: http://www.airport-surgut.ru/affiliates/talakan

Map
- Location of the airport in the Sakha Republic TLK (Russia)

Runways
Direction	Length		Surface
Direction	ft	m	Surface
01/19	10,170	3,100	Reinforced Concrete

Statistics (2017)
- Passengers: ▲265.5 thousand

Talakan Airport (Yakut: Талакан Аэропорт, romanized: Talakan Aeroport; Russian: Аэропорт Талакан) (IATA: TLK, ICAO: UECT) is an airport in Lensky District of Yakutia, Russia. It is located 105 km north-west of Vitim. The airport services Talakan oil field.

Talakan airport is the first in Russia, built solely by a private company.

== History ==
On 23 November 2012, a Tupolev Tu-154 belonging to UTair Airlines successfully completed the first technical flight to «Talakan» airport. On 20 December 2012, a direct flight by a Boeing 737 from Surgut to Talakan was made with 26 passengers on board, representing management of Surgutneftegas. They verified readiness of the facilities and equipment of the airport "Talakan" to start regular operations. On 24 December 2012, the airport welcomed its first scheduled passenger flight.

== Facilities ==
The airport services Antonov An-12, Antonov An-24, Antonov An-26, Antonov An-28, Antonov An-30, Antonov An-32, Antonov An-72, Antonov An-74, Antonov An-148, Ilyushin Il-76, Let L-410 Turbolet, Tupolev Tu-134, Tupolev Tu-154, Yakovlev Yak-40, Yakovlev Yak-40, ATR 42, ATR 72, Boeing 737-300(-400,-500,-700,-800), Bombardier CRJ 100/200 and all lighter types of aircraft.

== Airlines and destinations ==
Airlines	Destinations
Gazpromavia	Charter: Moscow–Vnukovo, Novy Urengoy, Noyabrsk, Ufa
KrasAvia	Bratsk, Tyumen, Ufa
NordStar	Krasnoyarsk–International
Polar Airlines	Krasnodar, Krasnoyarsk–International, Novosibirsk
Red Wings Airlines	Novosibirsk, Omsk, Ufa
S7 Airlines	Irkutsk, Novosibirsk
Utair	Surgut, Ufa
Yamal Airlines	Omsk

== See also ==
- List of airports in Russia
