= Innyaly =

Innyaly Иннялы
- Selo
- Interactive map of Innyaly
- Location of Innyaly Innyaly (Sakha Republic)
- Coordinates: 59°31′N 111°13′E
- Country: Russia
- Federal subject: Sakha Republic
- Administrative district: Lensky District
- Rural okrugSelsoviet: Tolonsky Rural Okrug
- Elevation: 264 m (866 ft)

Population
  - Estimate (2021): 169 )

Municipal status
  - Municipal district: Lensky Municipal District
  - Rural settlement: Tolonsky Rural Settlement
- Time zone: UTC+
- Postal code: 678164
- OKTMO ID: 98627440111

Innyaly (Russian: Иннялы; Yakut: Инньэли, romanized: İnņeli) is a rural locality (a selo) in Tolonsky Rural Okrug of Lensky District in the Sakha Republic, Russia, located 336 kilometers (209 mi) from Lensk, the administrative center of the district and 30 kilometers (19 mi) from Tolon, the administrative center of the rural okrug. Its population as of the 2002 Census was 169.
