= Bechencha =

Bechencha Беченча
- Selo
- Interactive map of Bechencha
- Location of Bechencha Bechencha (Sakha Republic)
- Coordinates: 60°57′34″N 115°28′30″E
- Country: Russia
- Federal subject: Sakha Republic
- Administrative district: Lensky District
- Rural okrugSelsoviet: Bechenchinsky Rural Okrug
- Elevation: 224 m (735 ft)

Population (2010 Census)
  - Total: 786
  - Estimate (2021): 737 (−6.2%)

Administrative status
  - Capital of: Bechenchinsky Rural Okrug

Municipal status
  - Municipal district: Lensky Municipal District
  - Rural settlement: Bechenchinsky Rural Settlement
  - Capital of: Bechenchinsky Rural Settlement
- Time zone: UTC+
- Postal code: 678164
- OKTMO ID: 98627405101

Bechencha (Russian: Беченча; Yakut: Бэтинчэ, Betinçe) is a rural locality (a selo), the only inhabited locality, and the administrative center of Bechenchinsky Rural Okrug of Lensky District in the Sakha Republic, Russia, located 49 kilometers (30 mi) from Lensk, the administrative center of the district. Its population as of the 2010 Census was 786, up from 777 recorded during the 2002 Census.
