= Lensky District, Sakha Republic =

Lensky District Ленский улус (Russian)
- District

Other transcription(s)
  - Sakha: Лиэнскэй улууһа
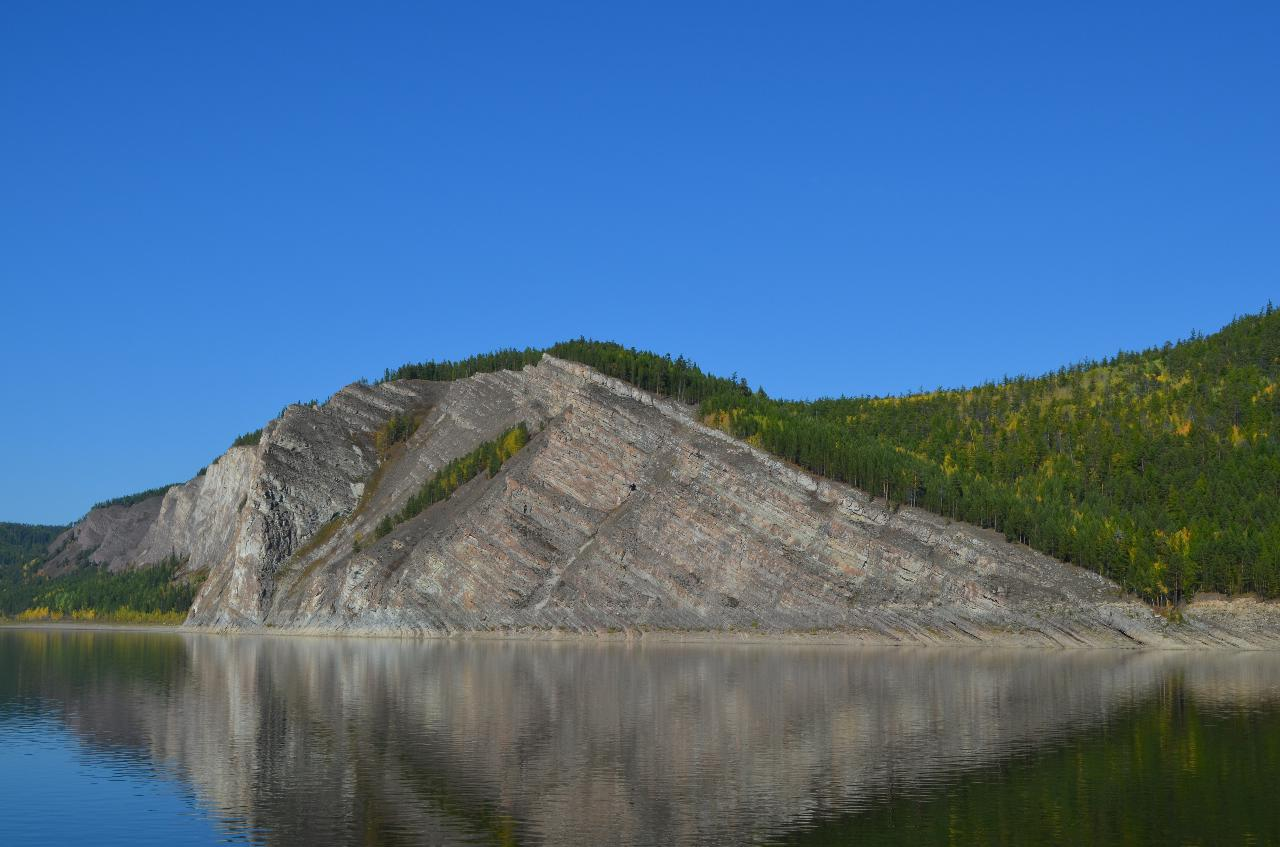
- Khapchagay Rock in Lensky District

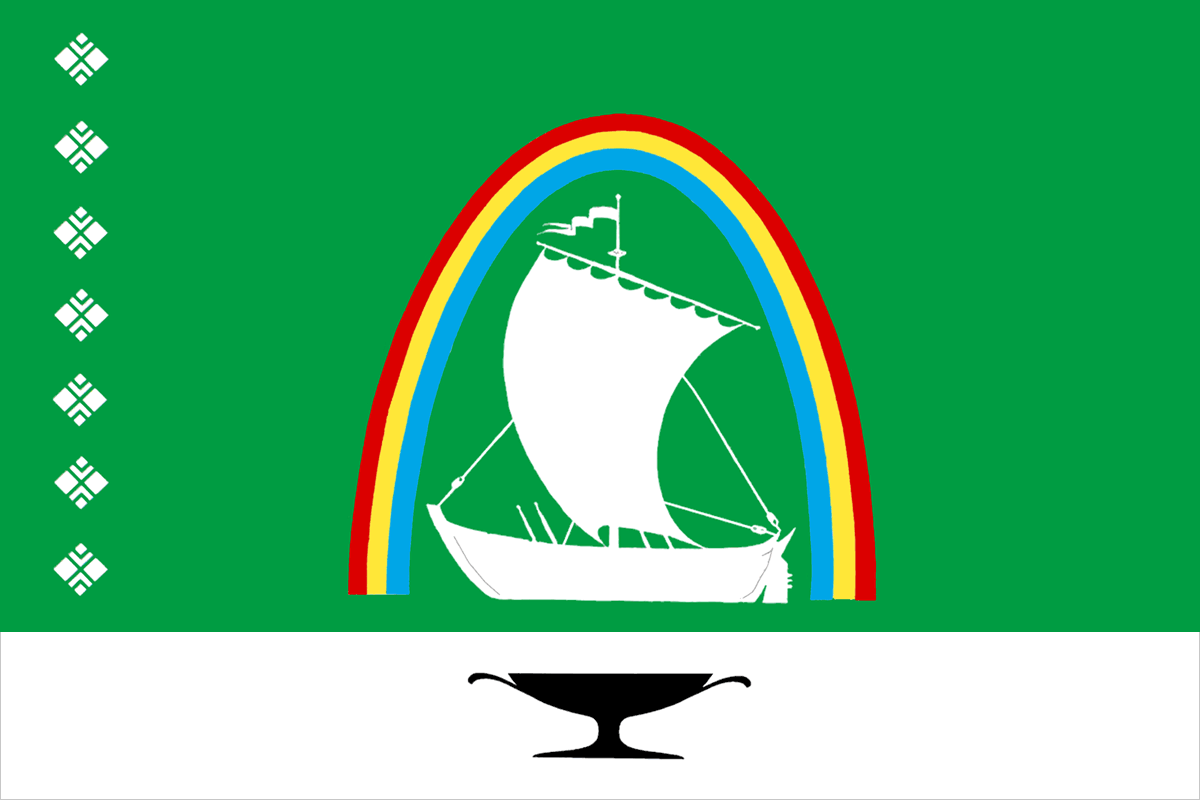
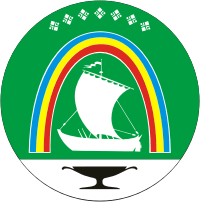
- Flag Coat of arms
- Location of Lensky District in the Sakha Republic
- Coordinates: 60°43′N 114°55′E
- Country: Russia
- Federal subject: Sakha Republic
- Established: January 30, 1930
- Administrative center: Lensk

Area
  - Total: 77,000 km^{2} (30,000 sq mi)

Population (2010 Census)
  - Total: 39,765
  - Density: 0.52/km^{2} (1.3/sq mi)
  - Urban: 87.0%
  - Rural: 13.0%

Administrative structure
  - Administrative divisions: 1 Towns, 2 Settlements, 8 Rural okrugs
  - Inhabited localities: 1 cities/towns, 2 urban-type settlements, 16 rural localities

Municipal structure
  - Municipally incorporated as: Lensky Municipal District
  - Municipal divisions: 3 urban settlements, 8 rural settlements
- Time zone: UTC+
- OKTMO ID: 98627000

Lensky District (Russian: Ле́нский улу́с; Yakut: Лиэнскэй улууһа, Lienskey uluuha) is an administrative and municipal district (raion, or ulus), one of the thirty-four in the Sakha Republic, Russia. It is located in the southwest of the republic and borders Mirninsky District in the north, Suntarsky District in the northeast, Olyokminsky District in the east, and Irkutsk Oblast in the south and west. The area of the district is 77,000 square kilometers (30,000 sq mi). Its administrative center is the town of Lensk. As of the 2010 Census, the total population of the district was 39,765, with the population of Lensk accounting for 62.8% of that number.

== Geography ==
The main river in the district is the Lena with its tributaries the Vitim, Peleduy, Derba and Nyuya.

=== Climate ===
Average January temperature is −32 °C (−26 °F) and average July temperature is +16–17 °C (61–63 °F). Annual precipitation is 300–400 millimeters (12–16 in).

== History ==
The district was established on January 30, 1930.

== Administrative and municipal status ==
Within the framework of administrative divisions, Lensky District is one of the thirty-four in the republic. It is divided into one town (an administrative division with the administrative center in the town (inhabited locality) of Lensk), two settlements (administrative divisions with the administrative centers in the urban-type settlements (inhabited localities) of Peleduy and Vitim), and eight rural okrugs (naslegs), all of which comprise sixteen rural localities. As a municipal division, the district is incorporated as Lensky Municipal District. Within the municipal district, the Town of Lensk is incorporated into Lensk Urban Settlement, the two settlements are incorporated into two urban settlements, and the eight rural okrugs are incorporated into eight rural settlements. The town of Lensk serves as the administrative center of both the administrative and municipal district.

=== Inhabited localities ===
Administrative/municipal composition
Towns/Urban settlements	Population	Inhabited localities in jurisdiction
Lensk (Ленск)	24,966	**Town of Lensk** (administrative center of the district)
Settlements/Urban settlements	Population	Inhabited localities in jurisdiction
Vitim (Витим)	4,376	**Urban-type settlement of Vitim**
Peleduy (Пеледуй)	5,262	**Urban-type settlement of Peleduy**; selo of Krestovsky lesouchastok
Rural okrugs/Rural settlements	Population	Rural localities in jurisdiction*
Bechenchinsky (Беченчинский)	786	**selo of Bechencha**
Murbaysky (Мурбайский)	350	**selo of Dorozhny**; selo of Nyuya Severnaya
Natorsky (Наторский)	441	**selo of Natora**
Nyuysky (Нюйский)	1,544	**selo of Nyuya**; selo of Turukta
Orto-Nakharinsky (Орто-Нахаринский)	689	**selo of Orto-Nakhara**; selo of Chamcha
Saldykelsky (Салдыкельский)	424	**selo of Murya**; selo of Batamay
Tolonsky (Толонский)	426	**selo of Tolon**; selo of Alysardakh; selo of Innyaly
Yaroslavsky (Ярославский)	501	**selo of Yaroslavsky**; selo of Khamra

*Administrative centers are shown in bold

== Economy ==
The economy of the district is mostly based on timber industry, production of construction materials, and food industry.

In the district are large oil and gas field such as :

- Talakan oil field in Talakan
- Chayanda field

These gas fields are the base for the Power of Siberia 1 gas pipeline linking Siberia and China.

== Demographics ==
Population of Lensky District
- 2010 Census: 39,765
- 2002 Census: 38,669
- 1989 Census: 49,702
- 1979 Census: 40,019

As of the 2021 Census, the ethnic composition was as follows:

- Russians: 78.1%
- Yakuts: 12.0%
- Ukrainians: 0.9%
- Kyrgyz: 0.8%
- Buryats: 0.7%
- Tatars: 0.6%
- Tajiks: 0.5%
- other ethnicities: 6.4%

== See also ==
- Lena Plateau
