= Turukta =

Turukta Турукта
- Selo
- Interactive map of Turukta
- Location of Turukta Turukta (Sakha Republic)
- Coordinates: 60°29′05″N 116°30′59″E
- Country: Russia
- Federal subject: Sakha Republic
- Administrative district: Lensky District
- Rural okrugSelsoviet: Nyuysky Rural Okrug
- Elevation: 131 m (430 ft)

Population
  - Estimate (2002): 210 )

Municipal status
  - Municipal district: Lensky Municipal District
  - Rural settlement: Nyuysky Rural Settlement
- Time zone: UTC+
- Postal code: 678163
- OKTMO ID: 98627430106

Turukta (Russian: Турукта) is a rural locality (a selo), one of two settlements, in addition to Nyuya, the administrative centre of the Rural Okrug, in Nyuysky Rural Okrug of Lensky District in the Sakha Republic, Russia. It is located 113 kilometers (70 mi) from Lensk, the administrative center of the district. Its population as of the 2002 Census was 210.
