= Krestovsky lesouchastok =

Krestovsky lesouchastok Крестовский лесоучасток
- Selo
- Interactive map of Krestovsky lesouchastok
- Location of Krestovsky lesouchastok Krestovsky lesouchastok (Sakha Republic)
- Coordinates: 59°47′N 113°17′E
- Country: Russia
- Federal subject: Sakha Republic
- Administrative district: Lensky District
- SettlementSelsoviet: Peleduy

Population (2010 Census)
  - Total: 19
  - Estimate (2021): 0 (−100%)

Municipal status
  - Municipal district: Lensky Municipal District
  - Urban settlement: Peleduy Urban Settlement
- Time zone: UTC+
- Postal code: 678157
- OKTMO ID: 98627157106

Krestovsky lesouchastok (Russian: Крестовский лесоучасток) is a rural locality (a selo) under the administrative jurisdiction of the Settlement of Peleduy in Lensky District of the Sakha Republic, Russia, located 167 kilometers (104 mi) from Lensk, the administrative center of the district, and 32 kilometers (20 mi) from Peleduy. Its population as of the 2010 Census was 19, down from 166 recorded in the 2002 Census.
