= Peleduy =

Peleduy Пеледуй
- Urban-type settlement

Other transcription(s)
  - Yakut: Пеледуй
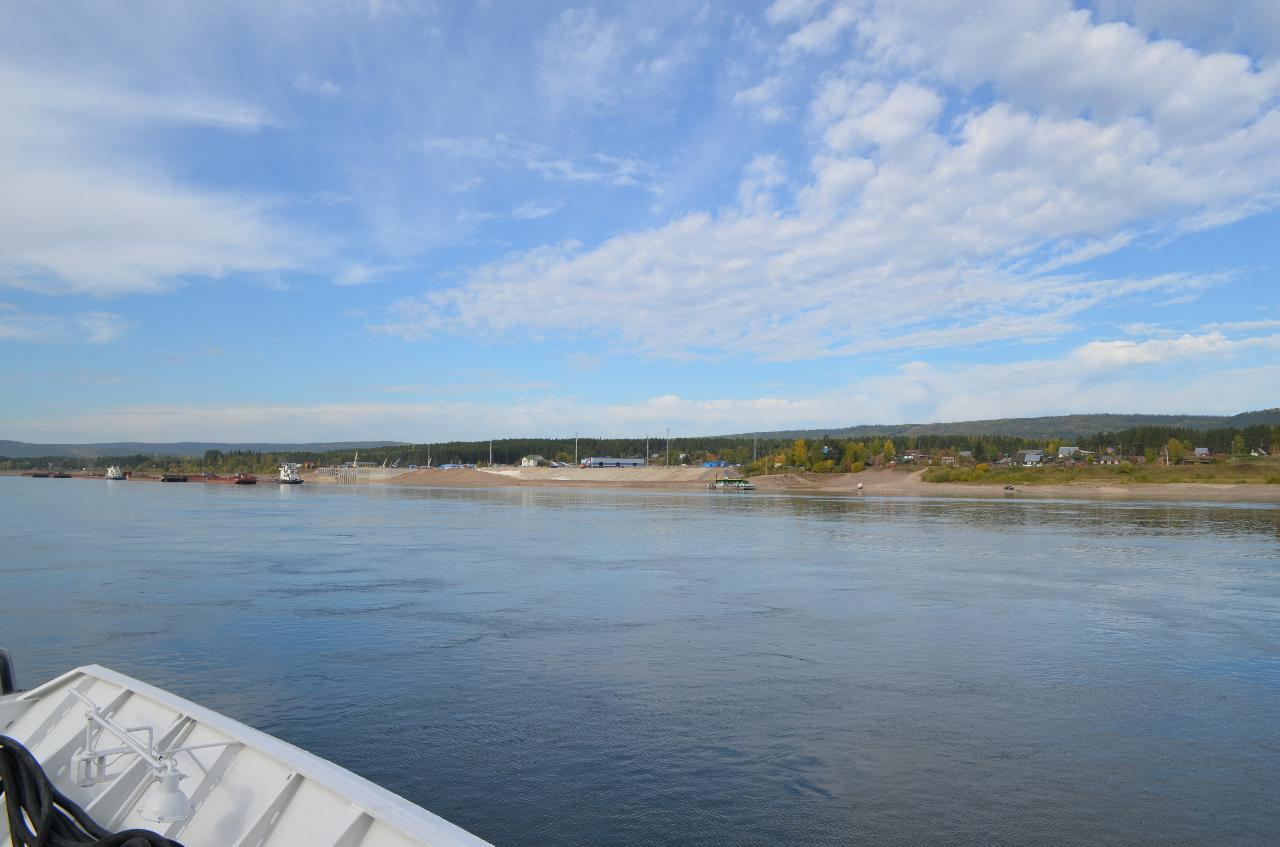
- View of Peleduy from the Lena River
- Interactive map of Peleduy
- Location of Peleduy Peleduy (Sakha Republic)
- Coordinates: 59°38′N 112°45′E
- Country: Russia
- Federal subject: Sakha Republic
- Administrative district: Lensky District
- SettlementSelsoviet: Peleduy
- Urban-type settlement status since: 1938

Population (2010 Census)
  - Total: 5,243
  - Estimate (2023): 3,578 (−31.8%)

Administrative status
  - Capital of: Settlement of Peleduy

Municipal status
  - Municipal district: Lensky Municipal District
  - Urban settlement: Peleduy Urban Settlement
  - Capital of: Peleduy Urban Settlement
- Time zone: UTC+
- Postal code: 678158
- OKTMO ID: 98627157051

Peleduy population
- 2010 Census: 5,243
- 2002 Census: 4,710
- 1989 Census: 5,080

Peleduy (Russian: Пеледуй; Yakut: Пеледуй) is an urban locality (an urban-type settlement) in Lensky District of the Sakha Republic, Russia. As of the 2010 Census, its population was 5,243.

== Geography ==
Peleduy is located on the northern side of the edge of the Patom Highlands, by the confluence of the Peleduy, on the left bank of the Lena, approximately 840 kilometers (520 mi) west of Yakutsk, the capital of the republic and 199 kilometers (124 mi) from Lensk, the administrative center of the district.

== History ==
Urban-type settlement status was granted to Peleduy in 1938.

== Administrative and municipal status ==
Within the framework of administrative divisions, the urban-type settlement of Peleduy, together with one rural locality (the selo of Krestovsky lesouchastok), is incorporated within Lensky District as the Settlement of Peleduy. As a municipal division, the Settlement of Peleduy is incorporated within Lensky Municipal District as Peleduy Urban Settlement.
