= Natora =

Natora Натора
- Selo
- Interactive map of Natora
- Location of Natora Natora (Sakha Republic)
- Coordinates: 60°32′10″N 116°06′46″E
- Country: Russia
- Federal subject: Sakha Republic
- Administrative district: Lensky District
- Rural okrugSelsoviet: Natorsky Rural Okrug
- Elevation: 169 m (554 ft)

Population (2010 Census)
  - Total: 441
  - Estimate (2021): 405 (−8.2%)

Administrative status
  - Capital of: Natorsky Rural Okrug

Municipal status
  - Municipal district: Lensky Municipal District
  - Rural settlement: Natorsky Rural Settlement
  - Capital of: Natorsky Rural Settlement
- Time zone: UTC+
- Postal code: 678162
- OKTMO ID: 98627428101

Natora (Russian: Натора; Yakut: Нуотара, Nuotara) is a rural locality (a selo), the only inhabited locality, and the administrative center of Natorsky Rural Okrug of Lensky District in the Sakha Republic, Russia, located 102 kilometers (63 mi) from Lensk, the administrative center of the district. Its population as of the 2010 Census was 441, up from 400 recorded during the 2002 Census.
