= Batamay, Lensky District, Sakha Republic =

Batamay Батамай
- Selo
- Interactive map of Batamay
- Location of Batamay Batamay (Sakha Republic)
- Coordinates: 60°45′40″N 115°37′10″E
- Country: Russia
- Federal subject: Sakha Republic
- Administrative district: Lensky District
- Rural okrugSelsoviet: Saldykelsky Rural Okrug

Population
  - Estimate (2002): 190 )

Municipal status
  - Municipal district: Lensky Municipal District
  - Rural settlement: Saldykelsky Rural Settlement
- Time zone: UTC+
- Postal code: 678164
- OKTMO ID: 98627436106

Batamay (Russian: Батамай) is a rural locality (a selo), one of two settlements, in addition to Murya, the administrative centre of the Rural Okrug, in Saldykelsky Rural Okrug of Lensky District in the Sakha Republic, Russia. It is located 36 kilometers (22 mi) from Lensk, the administrative center of the district. Its population as of the 2002 Census was 190.
