= Dorozhny =

Dorozhny Дорожный
- Selo
- Interactive map of Dorozhny
- Location of Dorozhny Dorozhny (Sakha Republic)
- Coordinates: 61°26′45″N 114°21′40″E
- Country: Russia
- Federal subject: Sakha Republic
- Administrative district: Lensky District
- Rural okrugSelsoviet: Murbaysky Rural Okrug

Population
  - Estimate (2002): 175 )

Administrative status
  - Capital of: Murbaysky Rural Okrug

Municipal status
  - Municipal district: Lensky Municipal District
  - Rural settlement: Murbaysky Rural Settlement
  - Capital of: Murbaysky Rural Settlement
- Time zone: UTC+
- Postal code: 678166
- OKTMO ID: 98627420106

Dorozhny (Russian: Дорожный) is a rural locality (a selo), the administrative centre of and one of two settlements, in addition to Nyuya Severnaya, in Murbaysky Rural Okrug of Lensky District in the Sakha Republic, Russia. It is located 96 kilometers (60 mi) from Lensk, the administrative center of the district. Its population as of the 2002 Census was 175.
