= Chayanda field =

Hydrocarbon resource field in Russia

- Location within Russia
- Country: Russia
- Region: Yakutia
- Location: Nepa Arch oil and gas area Lensky District, Sakha Republic
- Offshore/onshore: Onshore
- Coordinates: 60°21′16.2″N 111°42′30.96″E
- Owner: Gazprom

Field history
- Discovery: 1989
- Start of production: 2019 (expected)

Production
- Estimated oil in place: 68.4 million tonnes (~ 79.7×10^{6} m^{3} or 501 million bbl)
- Estimated gas in place: 1,240×10^{9} m^{3} (44×10^{12} cu ft)
- Producing formations: Vendian sandstone

Chayanda field (also known as Chayandinskoye field; Russian: Чаяндинское месторождение) is a large hydrocarbon resource field, primarily of natural gas and gas condensates. It is located in the Lensky District of the Sakha Republic in Yakutiya.

The Chayanda field is located within the Nepa Arch oil and gas area of the central part of Nepa–Botuoba Anteclise in the southern part of the East Siberian Platform. It is hosted in Vendian sandstone reservoir. In 2010, the resource in place (C1+C2 categories) was estimated at 1.24 trillion cubic metres (44 trillion cubic feet) of natural gas and 68.4 million ton of oil and gas condensates. As a result of the geological exploration in 2010–2011, reserves were increased by 251.3 billion cubic metres (8.87 trillion cubic feet). 86% of the natural gas in the field is methane. Up to 8% of the natural gas is nitrogen. The oil fractions contain heavy crude oil, tar and paraffin. In addition, there are 1.4 billion cubic metres (49 billion cubic feet) of helium reserves.

The field was discovered in 1989. In 2007, the Federal Mineral Resources Agency of Russia planned to sell the oil development rights of the field separately from the gas rights. However, later that year the field was included in the list of strategic resources and in April 2008, the research and exploitation licence for the field was granted without a public tender to Gazprom. Geological prospecting is carried out by Gazprom Geologorazvedka and it should be done by 2015. Gas production will be operated by Gazprom Dobycha Noyabrsk while Gazprom Neft may become an operator of oil production.

The investment in the field development is about 430 billion roubles (US$13.66 billion). This includes more than 300 gas and 140 oil wells, four pre-treatment units, one comprehensive gas treatment unit, one oil treatment unit, and three booster compressor stations. The maximum gas production is expected to be up to 25 billion cubic metres per annum (880 billion cubic feet per annum) and oil production up to 1.5 million tonnes per annum. Production of oil is expected to start in 2014 and production of natural gas in 2019. Produced gas will be transported by the Power of Siberia pipeline. Helium will be separated from natural gas at the Belogorsk plant. Produced helium would be purchased by Matheson and Linde.

== See also ==
- Petroleum industry in Russia
