= Sakhalin–Khabarovsk–Vladivostok pipeline =

Natural gas pipeline in Russia

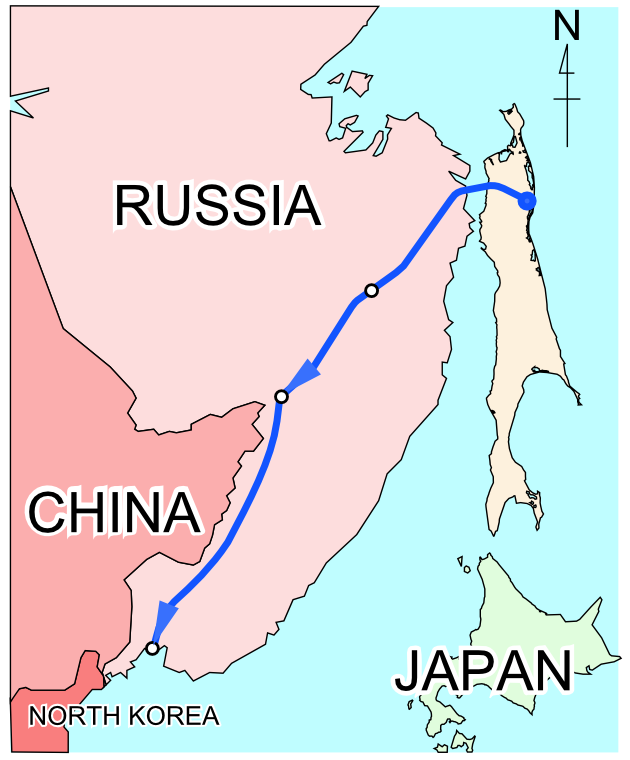
- Location of Sakhalin–Khabarovsk–Vladivostok pipeline

Location
- Country: Far East, Russia
- Direction: east-west-south
- Start: Sakhalin
- Passes through: Komsomolsk-on-Amur, Khabarovsk
- To: Vladivostok

General information
- Type: Natural gas
- Partners: Gazprom
- Operator: Gazprom Invest Vostok
- Commissioned: 8 September 2011

Technical information
- Length: 1,822 km (1,132 mi)
- Maximum discharge: 36.5 billion cubic metres per year (3.53 Bcfd)

The Sakhalin–Khabarovsk–Vladivostok pipeline is a pipeline for natural gas in Russia, transporting Sakhalin's gas to the most populated and industrialized regions of the Russian Far East (Khabarovsk Krai and Primorsky Krai). It is also projected to become a part of an international export route, carrying Russian gas to East Asian countries, such as the People's Republic of China, South Korea and Japan. The pipeline is owned and operated by Gazprom. It was opened on 8 September 2011.

== History ==
The project was announced in September 2007, when the Russian Federation's Industry and Energy Ministry approved the gas Development Program for Eastern Siberia and the Far East. It was aimed at reducing utility prices in the Russian Far East by replacing more expensive coal and petroleum at the regional power and heating plants with cheaper natural gas.

The pipeline project was approved by Gazprom's board of directors on 23 July 2008. At the same meeting, Gazprom's board of directors agreed to purchase the Komsomolsk–Khabarovsk pipeline, commissioned in November 2006 by Daltransgaz, a former subsidiary of Rosneft. Design and exploration work was completed in November 2008 and working documentation was prepared by April 2009.

Construction began on 31 July 2009 in Khabarovsk with a ceremony, which was attended by the Russian Prime Minister Vladimir Putin. The pipeline was opened on 8 September 2011. The opening ceremony on Russky Island was again attended by Prime Minister Putin.

The first gas consumer in the Primorsky Krai was Vladivostok Combined Heat and Power Plant 2 (CHPP-2), tasked with converting from coal to natural gas. In early 2012, CHPP-1 and the heating plant in Severnaya will be converted to natural gas.

In February 2022 the China National Petroleum Corporation signed a long-term gas supply contract with Gazprom which projects gas deliveries to China to grow to 10 bcm and reach 48 bcmy including other pipeline deliveries when the project is complete.

== Route ==
The 1,822-kilometre (1,132 mi) Sakhalin–Khabarovsk–Vladivostok gas transport system consists of three sections. The Khabarovsk–Vladivostok section together with the first phase of the Sakhalin–Komsomolsk section, which supplies gas from the Gazprom's Far East northern part's gas fields, will create a 1,350-kilometre (840 mi) pipeline system. The third section - the 472-kilometre (293 mi) Komsomolsk–Habarovsk pipeline, commissioned in 2006- would then be connected to the proposed Yakutia–Khabarovsk–Vladivostok pipeline.

The pipeline will supply gas to China and Japan and there is a planned link to South Korea. From Vladvivostok, a Chinese pipeline under construction since 2015 by China Petroleum Pipeline Bureau will extend across China, reaching Shanghai. The pipeline also will feed a planned LNG plant in Primorsky Krai, producing liquefied natural gas for export to Japan, and a proposed petrochemical complex. There are also plans to supply gas from Vladivostok to Japan and South Korea by subsea pipelines. An alternative route to South Korea would be via an overland pipeline through North Korea. According to Russian foreign minister Sergey Lavrov, this proposed pipeline would help strengthen security in East Asia by meeting North Korea's energy needs and providing it with transit revenue. The project was also discussed during the visit of Kim Jong Il to Russia in August 2011.

== Technical description ==
The capacity of the pipeline is 6 billion cubic metres (210 billion cubic feet) of natural gas per year during the first stage, rising to 30 billion cubic metres (1.1 trillion cubic feet) by 2020, of which 8 billion cubic metres (280 billion cubic feet) would be supplied from Sakhalin. It is expected to cost US$21–24 billion.

The diameter of the Sakhalin–Komsomolsk and Khabarovsk–Vladivostok pipelines is 1,220 millimetres (48 in), with a working pressure of 100 standard atmospheres (10 MPa). The diameter of the Komsomolsk–Khabarovsk pipeline is 700 millimetres (28 in).

In addition to the three pipelines, the Sakhalin–Khabarovsk–Vladivostok system consists of the Sakhalin main compressor station, a gas distribution station in Vladivostok, a power supply, telemechanics, communications systems and access roads.

== Supply source ==
The pipeline is fed from the Sakhalin-III project with additional gas provided from the Sakhalin-II project. The main supply source is the Gazprom-owned Kirinskoye field.

== Owner ==
The pipeline project was developed by Gazprom Invest Vostok, a subsidiary of Gazprom. The pipeline is operated by Gazprom.

== See also ==
- Energy policy of Russia
- Yakutia–Khabarovsk–Vladivostok pipeline
- Energy security of China
