= Peleduy (river) =

River in Russia

Peleduy Пеледуй
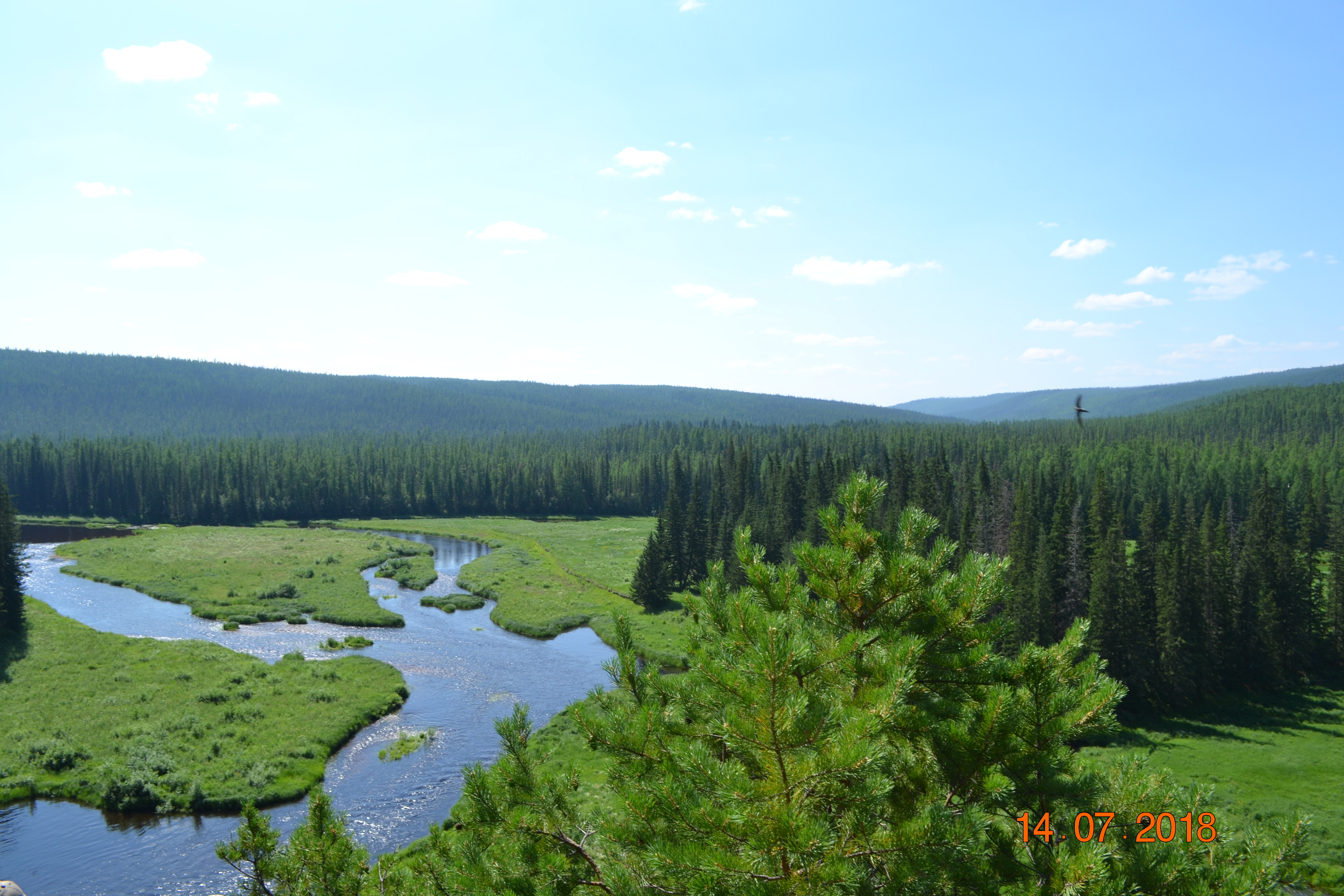
- Panorama of the Peleduy near the mouth

- Mouth location in Yakutia, Russia

Location
- Country: Russia

Physical characteristics
- Source
  - location: Lena Plateau
  - coordinates: 60°01′16″N 109°54′46″E
  - elevation: 430 m (1,410 ft)
- Mouth: Lena
  - location: Peleduy
  - coordinates: 59°38′23″N 112°46′01″E
  - elevation: 174 m (571 ft)
- Length: 398 km (247 mi)
- Basin size: 14,300 km^{2} (5,500 sq mi)
- Discharge
  - average: 47.6 m^{3}/s (1,680 cu ft/s)

Basin features
- Progression: Lena→ Laptev Sea

The Peleduy (Russian: Пеледуй) is a river in Yakutia (Sakha Republic), Russia. It is the 22nd longest tributary of the Lena with a length of 398 kilometres (247 mi) and a drainage basin area of 14,300 square kilometres (5,500 mi^{2}).

The river flows across a largely desolate area. Tolon village is located by the river in its middle course and the settlement of Peleduy is located by the Peleduy at the confluence with the Lena. There is rock salt mining and wood processing in the basin of the river. At Peleduy there is a shipping yard for shipbuilding, maintenance and overhaul.

== History ==
In 2006 the Talakan - Vitim oil pipeline burst in two places. About 244 metric tons (240 long tons; 269 short tons) of oil spilled into the river, soiling a 103 kilometres (64 mi) long stretch of the Peleduy with an oil film from the mouth of the stream running into Taloye lake, by the mouth in the Lena. The oil contamination penetrated to a depth of 60 centimetres (24 in) in the affected riverbank areas.

== Course ==
The Peleduy is a left tributary of the Lena. It has its sources in the southwestern area of the Lena Plateau. The river flows in a roughly southeastern direction among large boulders within a fairly straight channel. In its middle reaches it bends northeastwards within a floodplain and not far south of the course of the Nyuya it bends southeastwards again. Finally it meets the left bank of the Lena by Peleduy village 2,690 kilometres (1,670 mi) from its mouth.

=== Tributaries ===
The largest tributaries of the Peleduy are the Mulisma and Kodardakh from the right and the Delinda, Gadala, Kurchakh, Karam and Khoron from the left. The river freezes between October and May. Permafrost is prevalent in the river basin.

Basin of the Lena

== Flora and fauna ==
The vegetation of the Peleduy basin is mainly pine and larch taiga, with yearly snow cover between October and April in the area.

The main fish species in the river are dace, pike, roach, perch, ide, valyok, tugun, bream and grayling.

== See also ==
- List of rivers of Russia
