= Yaroslavsky, Sakha Republic =

Yaroslavsky Ярославский
- Selo
- Interactive map of Yaroslavsky
- Location of Yaroslavsky Yaroslavsky (Sakha Republic)
- Coordinates: 60°09′N 113°56′E
- Country: Russia
- Federal subject: Sakha Republic
- Administrative district: Lensky District
- Rural okrugSelsoviet: Yaroslavsky Rural Okrug
- Elevation: 200 m (660 ft)

Population
  - Estimate (2002): 457 )

Administrative status
  - Capital of: Yaroslavsky Rural Okrug

Municipal status
  - Municipal district: Lensky Municipal District
  - Rural settlement: Yaroslavsky Rural Settlement
  - Capital of: Yaroslavsky Rural Settlement
- Time zone: UTC+
- Postal code: 678168
- OKTMO ID: 98627449101

Yaroslavsky (Russian: Яросла́вский) is a rural locality (a selo) and the administrative center of Yaroslavsky Rural Okrug of Lensky District in the Sakha Republic, Russia, located 103 kilometers (64 mi) from Lensk, the administrative center of the district. Its population as of the 2002 Census was 457.
