= Orto-Nakhara =

Orto-Nakhara Орто-Нахара
- Selo
- Interactive map of Orto-Nakhara
- Location of Orto-Nakhara Orto-Nakhara (Sakha Republic)
- Coordinates: 60°49′12″N 114°19′29″E
- Country: Russia
- Federal subject: Sakha Republic
- Administrative district: Lensky District
- Rural okrugSelsoviet: Orto-Nakharinsky Rural Okrug
- Elevation: 220 m (720 ft)

Population
  - Estimate (2002): 379 )

Administrative status
  - Capital of: Orto-Nakharinsky Rural Okrug

Municipal status
  - Municipal district: Lensky Municipal District
  - Rural settlement: Orto-Nakharinsky Rural Settlement
  - Capital of: Orto-Nakharinsky Rural Settlement
- Time zone: UTC+
- Postal code: 678167
- OKTMO ID: 98627433101

Orto-Nakhara (Russian: Орто-Нахара; Yakut: Орто Наахара, Orto Naaxara) is a rural locality (a selo) and the administrative center of Orto-Nakharinsky Rural Okrug of Lensky District in the Sakha Republic, Russia, located 67 kilometers (42 mi) from Lensk, the administrative center of the district. Its population as of the 2002 Census was 379.
