= Derba =

River in Yakutia (Sakha Republic), Russia

Derba Дерба / Дьэрбэ
- Lena basin with the Derba in the middle

- Mouth location in Yakutia, Russia

Location
- Country: Russia

Physical characteristics
- Source
  - location: Central Siberian Plateau
  - coordinates: 61°40′43″N 116°16′40″E
  - elevation: 292 m (958 ft)
- Mouth: Lena
  - coordinates: 60°26′40″N 116°43′37″E
  - elevation: 149 m (489 ft)
- Length: 299 km (186 mi) (320 kilometres (200 mi))
- Basin size: 8,780 km^{2} (3,390 sq mi)

Basin features
- Progression: Lena→ Laptev Sea

The Derba (Russian: Дерба), also known as Derbe (Russian: Дербе; Yakut: Дьэрбэ, Cerbe) or Dzherba (Russian: Джерба), is a river in Yakutia (Sakha Republic), Russia. It is a tributary of the Lena with a length of 299 kilometres (186 mi) —320 kilometres (200 mi) counting the Mas-Turukhtaakh at its head— and a drainage basin area of 8,780 square kilometres (3,390 mi^{2}).

The river flows across an uninhabited area of the Lensky District.

== Course ==
The Derba is a left tributary of the Lena. It is formed at the confluence of the Kyuyokh-Ottakh (Кюёх-Оттоох) and Mas-Turukhtaakh (Мас-Турухтаах) rivers in the eastern fringes of the Central Siberian Plateau, to the south of the basin of the Vilyuy. The river heads in a roughly southern direction across taiga areas dotted with lakes. In its lower course it flows to the east of the Nyuya as it reaches the Lena floodplain and flows slowly in a swampy area. Finally it meets the Lena 2,395 kilometres (1,488 mi) from its mouth, 25 km (16 mi) east of the mouth of the Nyuya.

The largest tributaries of the Derba are the 146 kilometres (91 mi) long Ergedey (Эргэдьэй) and the 51 kilometres (32 mi) long Dyukta that join it from the left. There are 330 lakes in its basin. The Derba freezes yearly between October and May.

== See also ==
- List of rivers of Russia
