= Power of Siberia =

Natural gas pipeline from Siberia to China

Power of Siberia Sila Sibiri
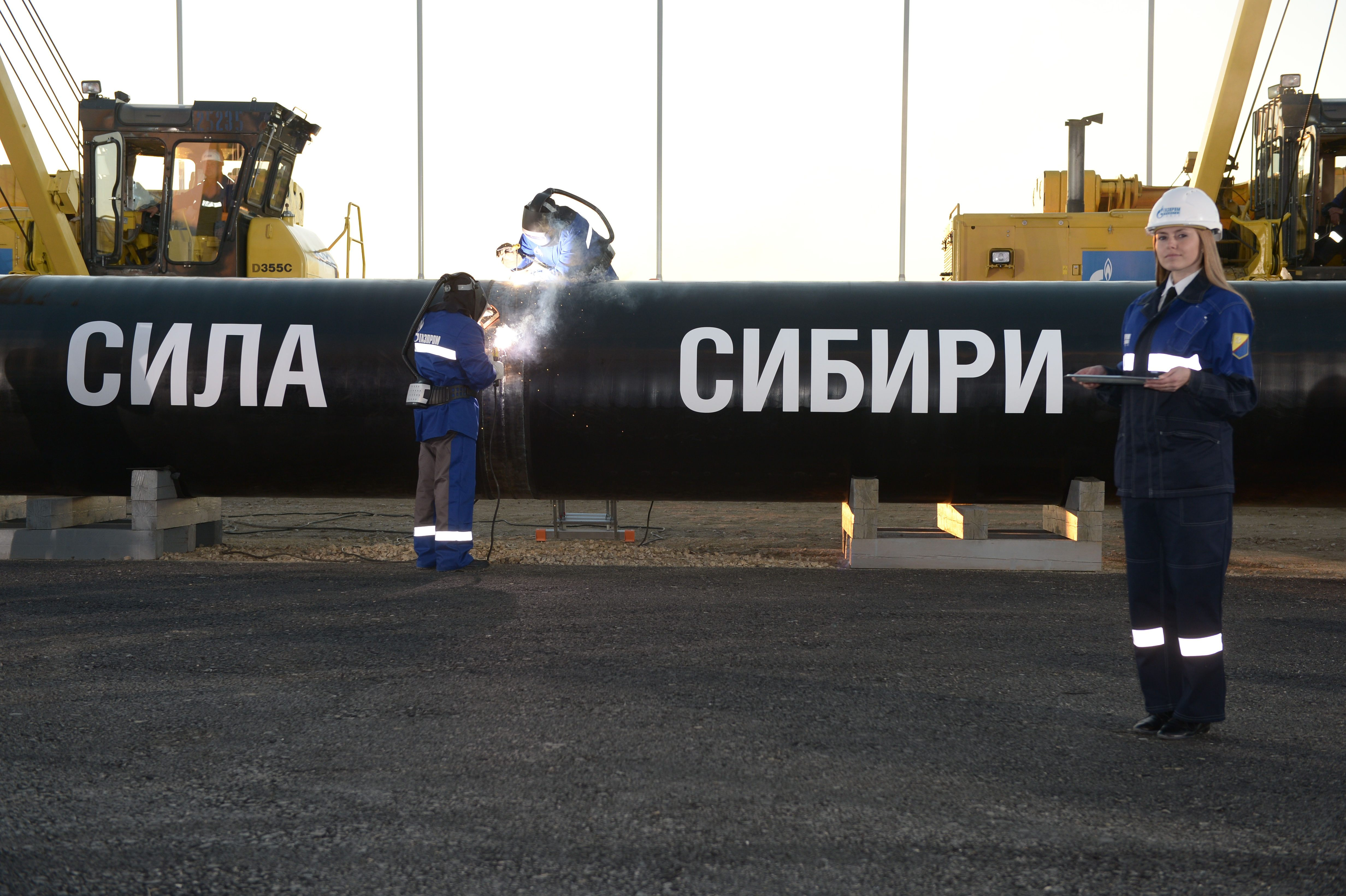
- Ceremony to mark the joining of the Power of Siberia gas pipeline’s first section

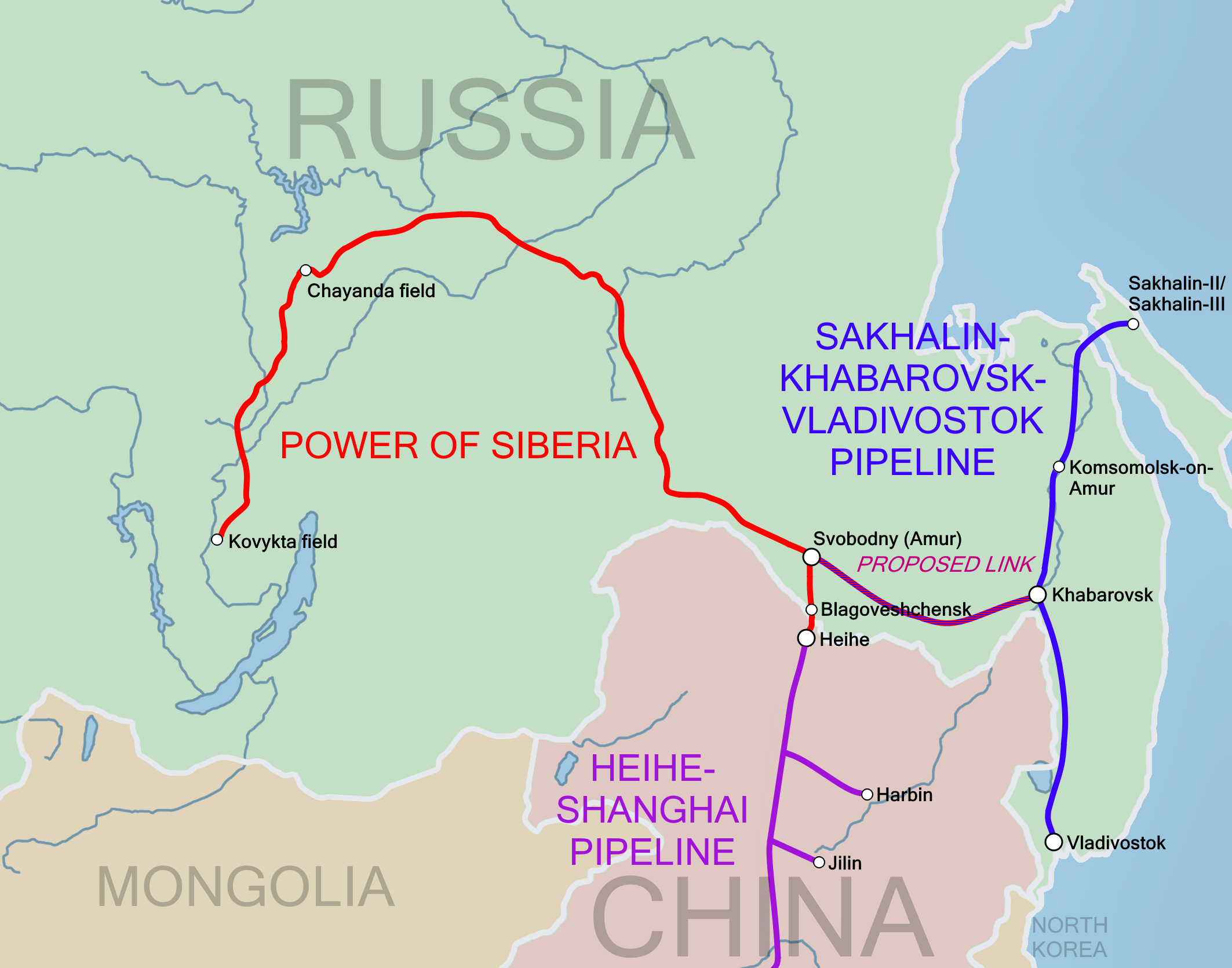
- The routes of the Power of Siberia pipeline (left), the Sakhalin–Khabarovsk–Vladivostok pipeline (right) and the proposed link between them (centre)

Location
- Country: Russia
- Direction: West-east-south
- Start: Chayanda field (phase 1); Kovykta field (phase 2)
- Passes through: Lensk; Olyokminsk; Aldan; Neryungri; Skovorodino; Svobodny; Khabarovsk (further expansion)
- To: Blagoveshchensk (phase 1); Vladivostok (further expansion)
- Runs alongside: Eastern Siberia-Pacific Ocean oil pipeline

General information
- Type: Natural gas
- Operator: Gazprom
- Pipe manufacturer: Vyksa Steel Works (OMK); Chelyabinsk Pipe Rolling Plant; Izhora Pipe Mill (Severstal); Volzhsky Pipe Plant of TMK; Zagorsk Pipe Plant; Pipe Innovative Technologies
- Contractors: Stroytransgaz; Neftegazstroy; Stroygazmontazh
- Commissioned: 2 December 2019

Technical information
- Length: 3,968 km (2,466 mi)
- Maximum discharge: 61 billion cubic metres per annum (2.2×10^{12} cu ft/a)
- Diameter: 1,420 mm (56 in)
- No. of compressor stations: 2 (operational); 9 (total)
- Compressor stations: Chayandinskaya; Atamanskaya; Saldykelskaya; Olyokminskaya; Amginskaya; Nimnyrkaya; Nagornaya; Skovorodinskaya; Sivakiskaya

Power of Siberia (Sila Sibiri, formerly named the Yakutia–Khabarovsk–Vladivostok pipeline, also known as China–Russia East-Route Natural Gas pipeline; Russian: Сила Сибири, Chinese: 中俄东线天然气管道; pinyin: zhōng é dōng xiàn tiānránqì guǎndào) is a Gazprom-operated pipeline in Eastern Siberia that transports natural gas from Yakutia to Primorsky Krai and China. It is a part of the eastern gas route from Siberia to China. The proposed western gas route to China is known as Power of Siberia 2 (Altai gas pipeline).

== History ==
In 2007, the Ministry of Industry and Energy of Russia approved the Eastern Gas Program, which included construction of the Yakutia–Khabarovsk–Vladivostok pipeline.

On 29 October 2012, Russian president Vladimir Putin instructed Alexey Miller, CEO of Gazprom to start the construction of the pipeline. The Yakutia–Khabarovsk–Vladivostok pipeline project was officially renamed Power of Siberia at the end of 2012.

On 21 May 2014, Russia and China signed a 30-year gas deal worth $400 billion which was needed to make the project feasible. Construction was launched on 1 September 2014 in Yakutsk by Putin and Chinese deputy prime minister Zhang Gaoli. Construction of the connecting pipeline in China started on 29 June 2015.

On 4 September 2016, Miller and China National Petroleum Corporation's Chairman Wang Yilin signed an agreement to build a crossing under the Amur River for the pipeline. Two tunnels under the river were completed by China Petroleum Pipeline in March 2019.

In 2017, construction of the Atamanskaya (Zeyskaya) compressor station began. The Atamanskaya and Chayandinskaya compressor stations were completed in 2019. Construction of all compressor stations is scheduled to be completed by 2022.

The pipeline was filled with gas in October 2019. Deliveries to China started on 2 December 2019. In 2020, China has imported 4.1 billion cubic meters of natural gas from Russia through the pipeline. It is expected that amount will increase to 38 billion cubic meters by 2023.

By December 2024, the full pipeline for the Power of Siberia was completed by China. After the pipeline's full completion, Russian state-owned gas supplier Gazprom announced that daily flows of pipeline gas supplies to China exceeded Russia's maximum contractual obligations.

== Technical description ==
Together with the development of the Chayanda field and the Amur Gas Processing Plant, the whole Power of Siberia project was expected to cost US$55–70 billion. As of April 2018, the pipeline was estimated to cost 1.1 trillion roubles, the development of the Chayanda field was estimated to cost 450 billion roubles, and the Amur Gas Processing Plant was estimated to cost 950 billion roubles.

The total length of the pipeline, when fully completed, will be 3,968 km (2,466 mi). The full capacity of the 1,420 mm (56 in) pipeline would be up to 61 billion m^{3} (2.2 trillion cu ft) per annum of natural gas, of which 38 billion m^{3} (1.3 trillion cu ft) per annum are supplied to China. In 2019, the export to China was expected to start with 5 billion m^{3} (180 billion cu ft) per annum in 2020, and to increase gradually to 38 billion m^{3} (1.3 trillion cu ft) per annum by 2025.

The pipeline's working pressure is ensured by nine compressor stations with a total capacity of 1,200 MW. The working pressure between the Chayanda field and the Atamanskaya compressor station is 9.8 MPa (1,420 psi), and between the Atamanskaya compressor station and the border of China is 11.8 MPa (1,710 psi). The Chayandinskaya compressor station has capacity of 577 MW and the Atamanskaya compressor station has capacity of 128 MW. The remaining seven compressor stations—Saldykelskaya, Olyokminskaya, Amginskaya, Nimnyrkaya, Nagornaya, Skovorodinskaya, and Sivakiskaya—have a total capacity of 481 MW.

The pipeline is able to withstand temperatures as low as −62 °C (−80 °F). It has a nanocomposite coating to increase the lifetime of the pipeline. To withstand earthquakes, the pipeline uses materials that will deform under seismic activity. Internal coatings ensure energy efficiency by reducing the friction of the pipeline's inner surfaces. The mass of all the pipes used to construct the pipeline is more than 2.25 million tonnes (2.5 million tons).

According to the study published by the Cambridge University Press, the pipeline seems to avoid technical and legal standards applied to similar pipelines from Russia to Europe because of lower requirements in both Russia and China.

== Route ==
The pipeline is fed from the Chayanda field in Yakutia, which was launched in 2019. The Kovykta field in Irkutsk Oblast will start to supply to the pipeline in 2023. The 2,156.1 km (1,339.7 mi) first phase of the pipeline starts at the Chayanda field in Yakutia. It runs, partly within the same corridor as the Eastern Siberia–Pacific Ocean oil pipeline, through Lensk, Olyokminsk, Aldan, Neryungri, Skovorodino, and Svobodny, where the pipeline is connected to the Amur Gas Processing Plant. From there, the pipeline branches south to Blagoveshchensk on the Russia–China border. By the two 1,139 m (3,737 ft) tunnels under the Amur River, it is connected to the 3,371 km (2,095 mi) Heihe–Shanghai pipeline in China. Together they form the eastern route for gas supplies from Siberia to China.

The 803.5 km (499.3 mi) second phase of the pipeline connects the Kovykta field to the Chayanda field. According to the original plan, the further 1,000 km (620 mi) extension of the Power of Siberia pipeline will continue from Svobodny through Birobidzhan to Khabarovsk where the pipeline will be linked with the Sakhalin–Khabarovsk–Vladivostok pipeline. Gazprom has not published if and when this extension will be built.

== Contractors ==
Gazprom Transgaz Tomsk was the main construction contractor, while VNIPIgazdobycha, both subsidiaries of Gazprom, was the general design contractor.

Different sections of the pipeline were built by Stroytransgaz owned by Gennady Timchenko, Neftegazstroy, and Stroygazmontazh owned by Arkady Rotenberg.

Pipes were manufactured by the Vyksa Steel Works of OMK, the Chelyabinsk Pipe Rolling Plant, the Izhora Pipe Mill of Severstal, the Volzhsky Pipe Plant of TMK, Zagorsk Pipe Plant, and Pipe Innovative Technologies. Anti-corrosion nanocomposite coating of pipes was done by Metaclay, a joint venture of Rusnano and Gazprom. Compressor turbine units were supplied by UEC-Perm Engines.

== Impact ==
The pipeline has strong implications for energy security in both China and Russia in the short term.

For China, the pipeline diversifies natural gas supplies for China. It is designed to reduce China's dependence on coal, which is more carbon intensive and causes more pollution than natural gas.

For Russia, the pipeline allows another economic partnership in the face of resistance to pipelines being built in Western Europe.

== See also ==
- Central Asia–China gas pipeline
- Energy policy of China
- Energy policy of Russia
- West–East Gas Pipeline
