= China Petroleum Pipeline Engineering =

Chinese state-owned company

China Petroleum Pipeline Engineering Co., Ltd.
- Industry: Oil and gas
- Headquarters: Langfang, Hebei, China
- Number of locations: China, Sudan, Libya, Mozambique, India, Thailand, Kazakhstan, Uzbekistan, Russia, United Arab Emirates, Chad, Niger, Myanmar, Iraq
- Website: cpp.cnpc.com.cn/gdjen/

The China Petroleum Pipeline Engineering Co., Ltd. (CPP) is a subsidiary of the China National Petroleum Corporation and the primary builder of pipelines in China. The company has built much of the cross-country pipeline infrastructure in China and had several large-scale projects abroad.

== Projects ==
- Habshan–Fujairah oil pipeline, a 1.5 million-barrel-per-day crude oil pipeline from Habshan, Abu Dhabi to Fujairah. It was built by CPP and China Petroleum Engineering and Construction Corporation, another subsidiary of CNPC, in a project under a construction contract for US$3.29 billion. The construction work was carried out from March 2008 to March 2011.
- East West Gas Pipeline, a key pipeline of India.
- China-Russia East Route Natural Gas Pipeline, a gas pipeline network linking gas fields in Russia's Far East through the completed Sakhalin–Khabarovsk–Vladivostok pipeline and planned Power of Siberia pipeline will carry gas on wards across China, reaching Shanghai. The Chinese side of the network has been under construction by CPP since 2015.

=== Cancelled projects ===
==== Borneo and Malacca-Johor ====
In August 2018, the Pakatan Harapan seventh cabinet of Malaysian Prime Minister Mahathir Mohamed canceled a CPP project in Malaysia, accusing it of participating in corruption. The company denied the allegations. At the time, the project paid for by the Malaysian government, was only 13% incomplete, but the money paid corresponded with a project that was close to 80% complete. In July 2019, Malaysian authorities seized $243.5M from China Petroleum Pipeline Engineering to compensate for the paid for but unfinished pipelines.
