= Murya, Russia =

Murya Мурья
- Selo
- Interactive map of Murya
- Location of Murya Murya (Sakha Republic)
- Coordinates: 60°45′04″N 115°17′04″E
- Country: Russia
- Federal subject: Sakha Republic
- Administrative district: Lensky District
- Rural okrugSelsoviet: Saldykelsky Rural Okrug
- Elevation: 189 m (620 ft)

Population
  - Estimate (2002): 233 )

Administrative status
  - Capital of: Saldykelsky Rural Okrug

Municipal status
  - Municipal district: Lensky Municipal District
  - Rural settlement: Saldykelsky Rural Settlement
  - Capital of: Saldykelsky Rural Settlement
- Time zone: UTC+
- Postal code: 678161
- OKTMO ID: 98627436101

Murya (Russian: Мурья) is a rural locality (a selo), the administrative centre of and one of two settlements, in addition to Batamay, in Saldykelsky Rural Okrug of Lensky District in the Sakha Republic, Russia. It is located 18 kilometers (11 mi) from Lensk, the administrative center of the district. Its population as of the 2002 Census was 233.
