= Alysardakh, Lensky District, Sakha Republic =

Alysardakh Алысардах
- Selo
- Interactive map of Alysardakh
- Location of Alysardakh Alysardakh (Sakha Republic)
- Coordinates: 59°30′N 111°59′E
- Country: Russia
- Federal subject: Sakha Republic
- Administrative district: Lensky District
- Rural okrugSelsoviet: Tolonsky Rural Okrug

Population
  - Estimate (2021): 0 )

Municipal status
  - Municipal district: Lensky Municipal District
  - Rural settlement: Tolonsky Rural Settlement
- Time zone: UTC+
- Postal code: 678168
- OKTMO ID: 98627440106

Alysardakh (Russian: Алысардах; Yakut: Алыһардаах, Alıhardaax) is a rural locality (a selo) in Tolonsky Rural Okrug of Lensky District of the Sakha Republic, Russia, located 275 kilometers (171 mi) from Lensk, the administrative center of the district and 35 kilometers (22 mi) from Tolon, the administrative center of the rural okrug. Its population as of the 2002 Census was 41.
