= Vitim, Sakha Republic =

Vitim Витим
- Urban-type settlement

Other transcription(s)
  - Yakut: Битиим
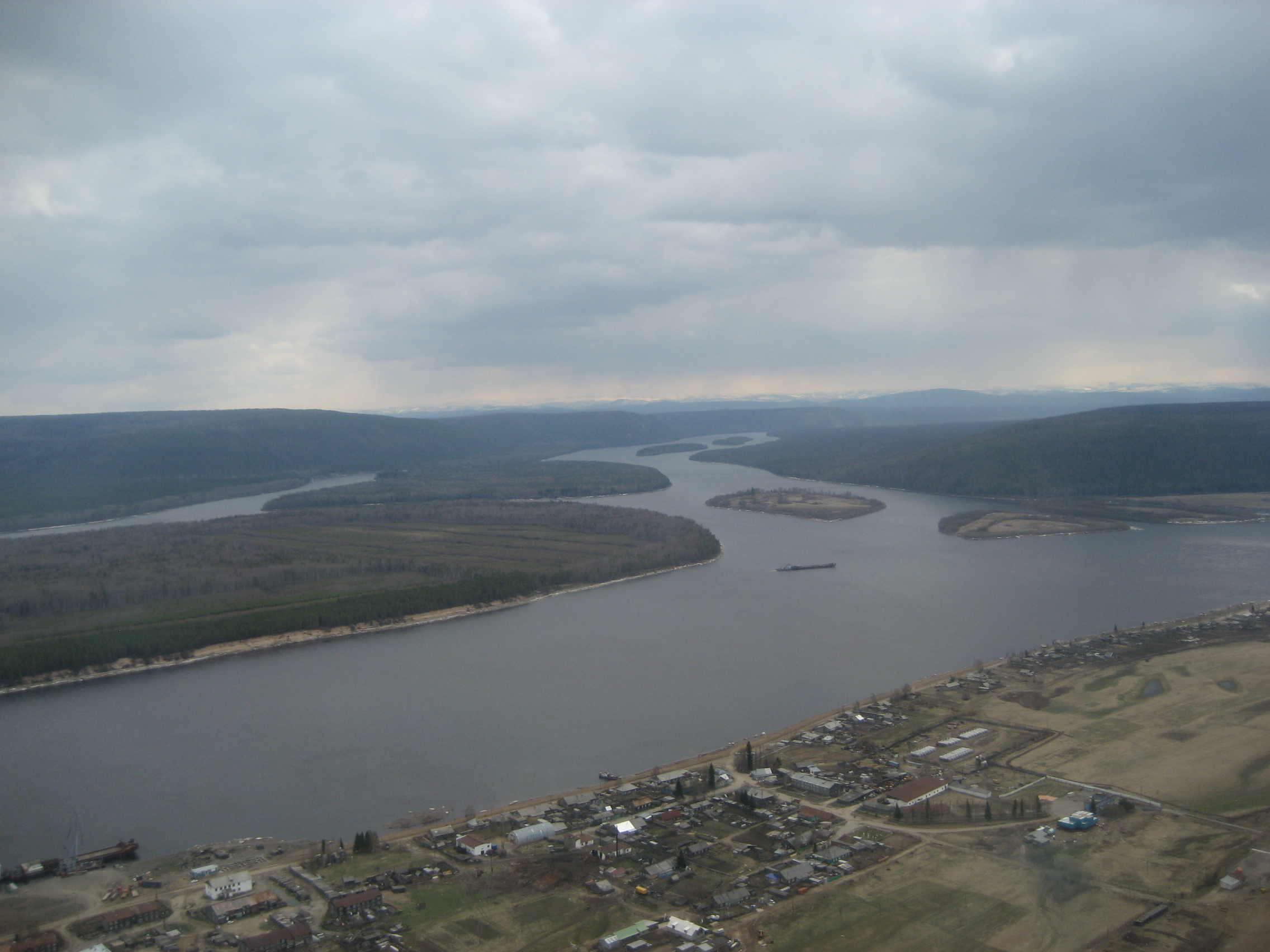
- Aerial view of Vitim
- Interactive map of Vitim
- Location of Vitim Vitim (Sakha Republic)
- Coordinates: 59°26′N 112°34′E
- Country: Russia
- Federal subject: Sakha Republic
- Administrative district: Lensky District
- SettlementSelsoviet: Vitim
- First mentioned: 17th century
- Urban-type settlement status since: 1958

Population (2010 Census)
  - Total: 4,376
  - Estimate (2023): 3,379 (−22.8%)

Administrative status
  - Capital of: Settlement of Vitim

Municipal status
  - Municipal district: Lensky Municipal District
  - Urban settlement: Vitim Urban Settlement
  - Capital of: Vitim Urban Settlement
- Time zone: UTC+
- Postal codes: 678150, 678152
- OKTMO ID: 98627153051

Vitim population
- 2010 Census: 4,376
- 2002 Census: 3,973
- 1989 Census: 5,311
- 1979 Census: 3,461

Vitim (Russian: Вити́м; Yakut: Битиим, romanized: Bitiim) is an urban locality (an urban-type settlement) in Lensky District of the Sakha Republic, Russia, located 229 kilometers (142 mi) from Lensk, the administrative center of the district, on the left bank of the Lena River at its confluence with the Vitim River. As of the 2010 Census, its population was 4,376.

== History ==
Vitim was first mentioned in 17th-century historical sources as a winter fort and later as a trading fort. By the mid-19th century, the settlement spread along a 2-kilometer (1.2 mi) section of the river, with a population of about 250 inhabitants, who made a living from river trade, fishing, hunting, gold mining, and handicrafts. During the Imperial era, it served as a place of political exile; H. Leivick was exiled here in 1912–1913.

Urban-type settlement status was granted to Vitim in 1958.

== Administrative and municipal status ==
Within the framework of administrative divisions, the urban-type settlement of Vitim is incorporated within Lensky District as the Settlement of Vitim. As a municipal division, the Settlement of Vitim is incorporated within Lensky Municipal District as Vitim Urban Settlement.

== Economy ==
Vitim's development is being influenced by the development of the Talakan oil field.

=== Transportation ===
Vitim is served by the Vitim Airport.

== Climate ==
Vitim has a subarctic climate (Köppen climate classification Dfc) with severely cold winters and warm summers. Precipitation is quite low but is somewhat higher in summer than at other times of the year.

Climate data for Vitim
| Month | Jan | Feb | Mar | Apr | May | Jun | Jul | Aug | Sep | Oct | Nov | Dec | Year |
|---|---|---|---|---|---|---|---|---|---|---|---|---|---|
| Record high °C (°F) | 1.1 (34.0) | 3.6 (38.5) | 12.2 (54.0) | 20.7 (69.3) | 32.9 (91.2) | 36.8 (98.2) | 36.6 (97.9) | 36.3 (97.3) | 28.8 (83.8) | 19.9 (67.8) | 7.7 (45.9) | 4.6 (40.3) | 36.8 (98.2) |
| Mean daily maximum °C (°F) | −24.0 (−11.2) | −18.7 (−1.7) | −6.3 (20.7) | 3.9 (39.0) | 13.1 (55.6) | 22.2 (72.0) | 25.2 (77.4) | 21.3 (70.3) | 12.4 (54.3) | 1.0 (33.8) | −13.3 (8.1) | −22.5 (−8.5) | 1.2 (34.2) |
| Daily mean °C (°F) | −28.9 (−20.0) | −25.6 (−14.1) | −15.4 (4.3) | −3.3 (26.1) | 6.2 (43.2) | 14.7 (58.5) | 18.1 (64.6) | 14.5 (58.1) | 6.4 (43.5) | −3.3 (26.1) | −18.1 (−0.6) | −27.0 (−16.6) | −5.1 (22.8) |
| Mean daily minimum °C (°F) | −34.2 (−29.6) | −32.0 (−25.6) | −23.7 (−10.7) | −10.5 (13.1) | −0.5 (31.1) | 7.5 (45.5) | 11.6 (52.9) | 8.9 (48.0) | 1.9 (35.4) | −7.1 (19.2) | −23.2 (−9.8) | −32.2 (−26.0) | −11.1 (12.0) |
| Record low °C (°F) | −60.2 (−76.4) | −57.6 (−71.7) | −51.5 (−60.7) | −40.9 (−41.6) | −22.1 (−7.8) | −6.4 (20.5) | −1.3 (29.7) | −4.9 (23.2) | −12.3 (9.9) | −34.6 (−30.3) | −50.6 (−59.1) | −61.2 (−78.2) | −61.2 (−78.2) |
| Average precipitation mm (inches) | 24.6 (0.97) | 17.1 (0.67) | 13.3 (0.52) | 16.2 (0.64) | 31.8 (1.25) | 51.0 (2.01) | 58.0 (2.28) | 60.8 (2.39) | 43.6 (1.72) | 40.5 (1.59) | 35.2 (1.39) | 28.9 (1.14) | 421 (16.57) |
| Average precipitation days (≥ 0.1 mm) | 22.9 | 18.2 | 14.1 | 11.7 | 12.5 | 13.7 | 12.5 | 14.7 | 15.3 | 20.3 | 23.8 | 24.2 | 203.9 |
| Average relative humidity (%) | 76.4 | 75.5 | 70.8 | 65.1 | 62.4 | 66.3 | 70.9 | 77.1 | 78.0 | 79.2 | 78.6 | 76.2 | 73.0 |
| Mean monthly sunshine hours | 33.0 | 88.0 | 167.0 | 207.0 | 242.0 | 274.0 | 281.0 | 209.0 | 122.0 | 68.0 | 43.0 | 16.0 | 1,750 |
Source: climatebase.ru (1930-2012)
