= Murya, Azerbaijan =

Murya
- Municipality
- Location within Azerbaijan
- Coordinates: 38°50′06″N 48°24′16″E
- Country: Azerbaijan
- Rayon: Lerik

Population
  - Total: 930
- Time zone: UTC+4 (AZT)
  - Summer (DST): UTC+5 (AZT)

Murya is a village and municipality in the Lerik Rayon of Azerbaijan. It has a population of 930.
