= Nyuya (river) =

Nyuya Нюя / Ньүүйэ
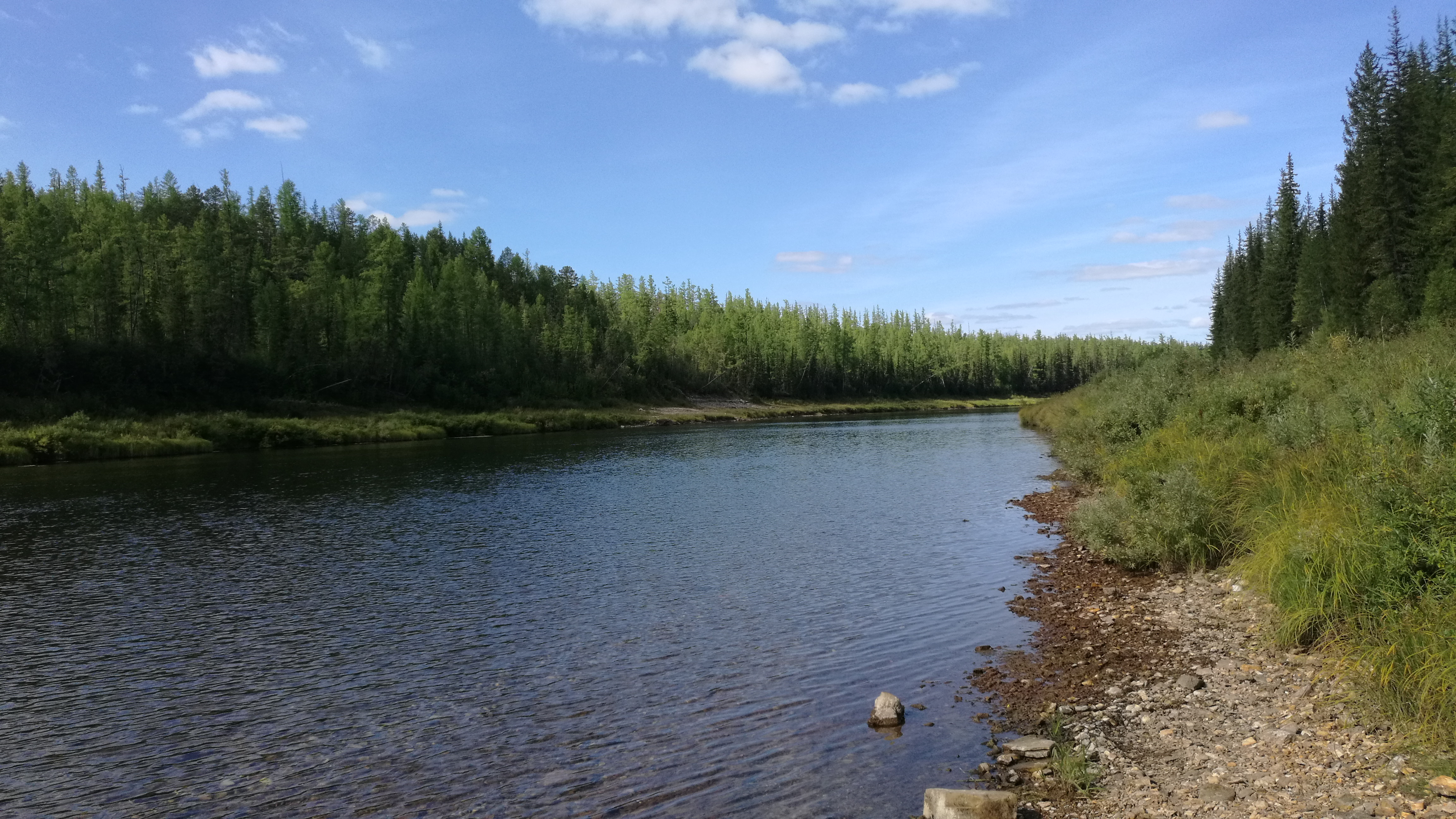

- Mouth location in Yakutia, Russia

Location
- Country: Russia

Physical characteristics
- Source
  - coordinates: 60°26′03″N 109°57′50″E
- Mouth: Lena
  - coordinates: 60.527°N 116.3071°E
- Length: 798 km (496 mi)
- Basin size: 38,100 km^{2} (14,700 sq mi)
- Discharge
  - average: 125 m^{3}/s (4,400 cu ft/s)

Basin features
- Progression: Lena→ Laptev Sea

The Nyuya (Russian: Нюя; Yakut: Ньүүйэ, Ñüüye) is a river in Sakha, Russia. It is a left tributary of the Lena. The length of the river is 798 kilometres (496 mi). The area of its basin is 38,100 square kilometres (14,700 mi^{2}).

== Course ==
The Nyuya has its source in the Lena Plateau and flows south of the course of the Peleduy. In its lower course it flows to the west of the Derba as it reaches the Lena floodplain and flows slowly, meandering in a swampy area. Finally it meets the Lena 2,420 kilometres (1,500 mi) from its mouth. There are over 600 lakes in the river basin.

=== Tributaries ===
The main tributaries of the Nyuya are the 141 kilometres (88 mi) long Tympychan, the 181 kilometres (112 mi) long Khamaky, the 201 kilometres (125 mi) long Ulakhan-Murbayy, the 190 kilometres (120 mi) long Ochchuguy-Murbayy, and the 173 kilometres (107 mi) long Betinche. The Nyuya freezes up in the second half of October and stays icebound until May.

Basin of the Lena

== See also ==
- List of rivers of Russia
