= Lensk =

Lensk Ленск
- Town under district jurisdiction

Other transcription(s)
  - Yakut: Лиэнскэй
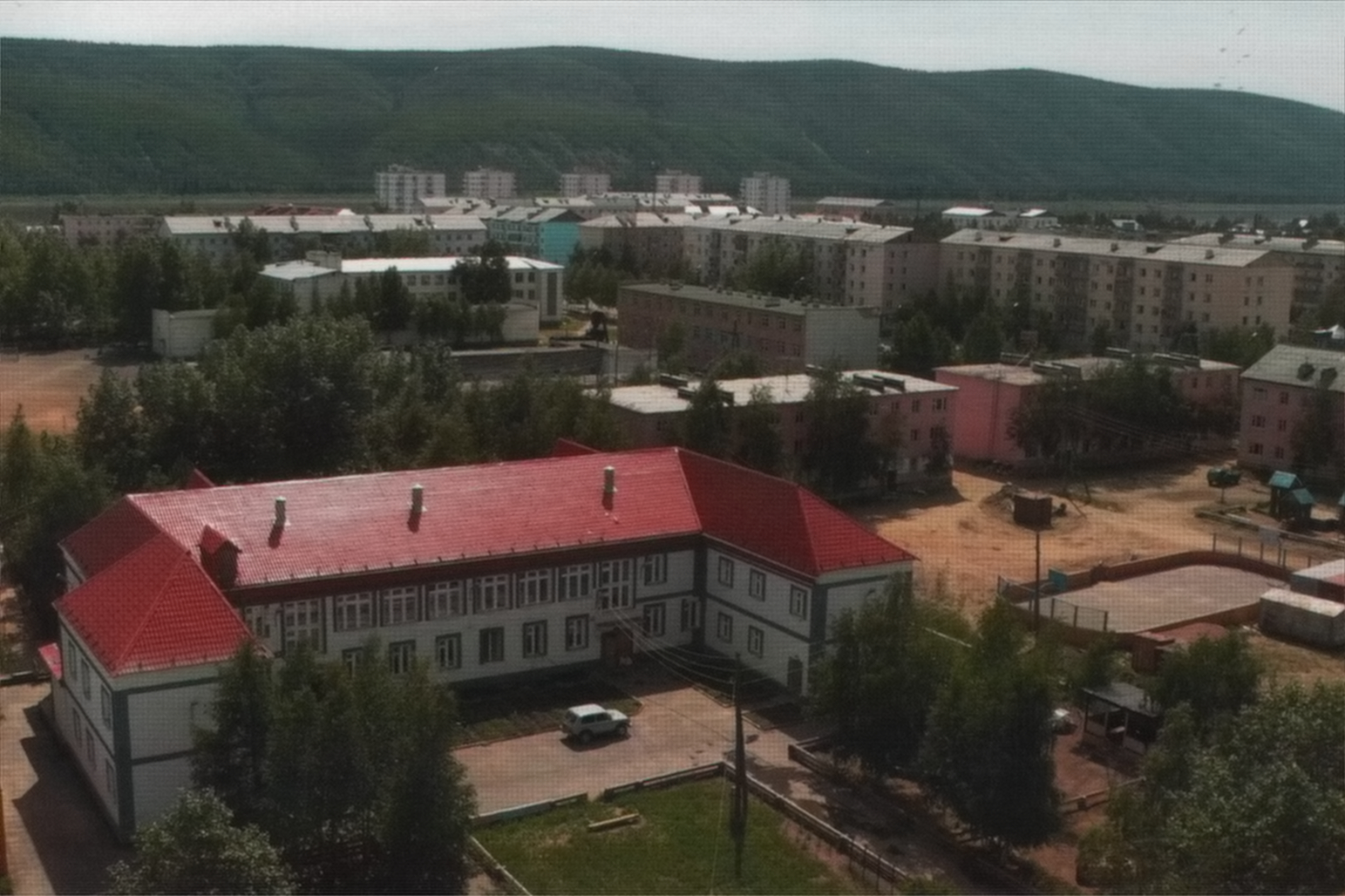
- View of the town center

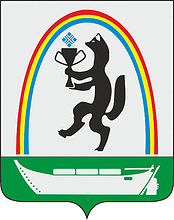
- Coat of arms
- Interactive map of Lensk
- Location of Lensk Lensk (Sakha Republic)
- Coordinates: 60°44′N 114°55′E
- Country: Russia
- Federal subject: Sakha Republic
- Administrative district: Lensky District
- TownSelsoviet: Lensk
- Founded: 1663
- Town status since: July 16, 1963

Government
  - Body: Town Council
  - Head: Alexander Khorunov
- Elevation: 180 m (590 ft)

Population (2010 Census)
  - Total: 24,966
  - Estimate (2023): 21,181 (−15.2%)

Administrative status
  - Capital of: Lensky District, Town of Lensk

Municipal status
  - Municipal district: Lensky Municipal District
  - Urban settlement: Lensk Urban Settlement
  - Capital of: Lensky Municipal District, Lensk Urban Settlement
- Time zone: UTC+
- Postal codes: 678141, 678142, 678144, 678145, 678149
- Dialing code: +7 41137
- OKTMO ID: 98627101001
- Website: www.gorodlensk.ru

Lensk (Russian: Ленск, IPA: [lʲɛnsk]; Yakut: Лиэнскэй, Lienskey) is a town and the administrative center of Lensky District of the Sakha Republic, Russia. As of the 2010 Census, its population was 24,966.

Historical population
Year	Pop.	±%
1939	2,184	—
1959	7,894	+261.4%
1970	16,758	+112.3%
1979	23,966	+43.0%
1989	30,260	+26.3%
2002	24,558	−18.8%
2010	24,966	+1.7%
2021	21,392	−14.3%
Source: Census data

== Geography ==
Lensk is located on the left bank of the Lena River, at the southern edge of the Lena Plateau, approximately 840 kilometers (520 mi) west of Yakutsk, the capital of the republic.

== History ==
The original settlement was founded as Mukhtuya (Мухтуя) in 1663 by Russian fur traders, on the site of an older Evenk settlement known as Mukhtuy. The name of the original settlement was derived from an Evenk term meaning "great water".

During the 19th and early 20th centuries, it was a place of political exile. It experienced a period of rapid growth during the 20th century as a result of the discovery and development of diamond deposits in the Vilyuy River basin. As the closest significant settlement to the major kimberlite excavations at the Mir Mine and the establishment of the associated town of Mirny, Mukhtuya became a major base of construction. In 1956, roads were built connecting Mukhtuya to the future Mirny and the port was established. On July 13, 1963, Mukhtuya was granted town status and was given its present name, after the river on which it stands.

In May 2001, Lensk briefly came to the world's attention when almost the entire town was flooded and a large amount of the buildings destroyed. The floods were caused by river ice blocking the river downstream, creating a dam. The town was largely rebuilt after the flooding.

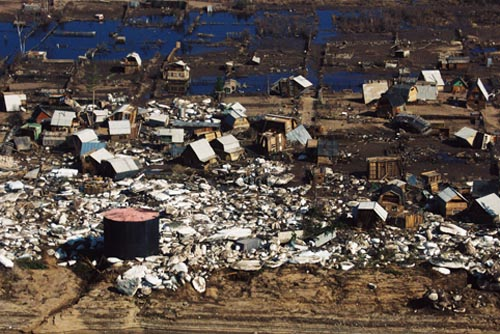
Lensk after the 2001 flood

== Administrative and municipal status ==
Within the framework of administrative divisions, Lensk serves as the administrative center of Lensky District. As an inhabited locality, Lensk is classified as a town under district jurisdiction. As an administrative division, it is incorporated within Lensky District as the Town of Lensk. As a municipal division, the Town of Lensk is incorporated within Lensky Municipal District as Lensk Urban Settlement.

== Economy ==
In addition to its association with the diamond industry and construction, Lensk has a significant forestry and timber sector and a large-panel housing factory. The town is also home to the Yakutalmaz scientific research organization.

Lensk is connected with Mirny by road and has scheduled air connections with Mirny, Yakutsk, and Irkutsk from the Lensk Airport. As a major port on the Lena, the town has developed as a processing point for the regional diamond industry.

== Culture and tourism ==
Lensk has a history museum and operates a branch of the Irkutsk Polytechnic Institute. A karst cave with a 25-meter (82 ft) waterfall and a karst lake is located 7 kilometers (4.3 mi) southwest of the town.

== Climate ==
Lensk has a strongly continental subarctic climate (Köppen Dfc). Winters are severely cold and long with average temperature −28.3 °C or −18.9 °F in December, although compared to the rest of Yakutia, these temperatures are not severe at all. Summers are brief but quite warm with average temperatures of 18.0 °C or 64.4 °F in July. Precipitation is moderate and is significantly higher in summer than at other times of the year.

Climate data for Lensk
Month	Jan	Feb	Mar	Apr	May	Jun	Jul	Aug	Sep	Oct	Nov	Dec	Year
Record high °C (°F)	0.0 (32.0)	1.0 (33.8)	12.6 (54.7)	18.9 (66.0)	33.4 (92.1)	38.7 (101.7)	37.3 (99.1)	36.3 (97.3)	27.7 (81.9)	17.2 (63.0)	5.7 (42.3)	1.1 (34.0)	38.7 (101.7)
Mean daily maximum °C (°F)	−23.8 (−10.8)	−17.9 (−0.2)	−6.6 (20.1)	3.8 (38.8)	13.0 (55.4)	22.7 (72.9)	24.7 (76.5)	20.9 (69.6)	11.4 (52.5)	−0.5 (31.1)	−15 (5)	−24.5 (−12.1)	0.7 (33.2)
Daily mean °C (°F)	−27.8 (−18.0)	−23.5 (−10.3)	−13.7 (7.3)	−2.6 (27.3)	6.7 (44.1)	15.5 (59.9)	18.0 (64.4)	14.3 (57.7)	5.9 (42.6)	−4.4 (24.1)	−19.1 (−2.4)	−28.3 (−18.9)	−4.9 (23.2)
Mean daily minimum °C (°F)	−31.9 (−25.4)	−28.9 (−20.0)	−21 (−6)	−9.7 (14.5)	0.2 (32.4)	8.0 (46.4)	11.4 (52.5)	8.2 (46.8)	1.4 (34.5)	−8.2 (17.2)	−23.3 (−9.9)	−32.3 (−26.1)	−10.5 (13.1)
Record low °C (°F)	−56.3 (−69.3)	−56.1 (−69.0)	−50 (−58)	−37.7 (−35.9)	−17.9 (−0.2)	−5.2 (22.6)	−1.8 (28.8)	−5.5 (22.1)	−12.8 (9.0)	−31.8 (−25.2)	−51.7 (−61.1)	−56.1 (−69.0)	−56.3 (−69.3)
Average precipitation mm (inches)	21 (0.8)	17 (0.7)	16 (0.6)	18 (0.7)	35 (1.4)	50 (2.0)	65 (2.6)	65 (2.6)	46 (1.8)	37 (1.5)	32 (1.3)	22 (0.9)	424 (16.9)
Source: climatebase.ru (1948-2011)
