= Tim Cope =

Australian adventurer, author, and filmmaker (born 1978)

Tim Cope (born 7 December 1978) is an Australian adventurer, author, filmmaker, trekking guide, and public speaker who grew up in Gippsland, Victoria. He has learned to speak fluent Russian and specializes in countries of the former Soviet Union.

== Biography ==
Tim Cope was born in Warragul, in Victoria, and raised in nearby Drouin South. He is the oldest of four children. His father was an outdoor educator who took his family on adventurous trips around southern Australia including hiking, climbing, boating and skiing.

Cope's expeditions include riding a recumbent bicycle 10,000 km across Russia to Beijing (2000) with fellow Australian Chris Hatherly; rowing a boat down the Yenisei River in Siberia to the Arctic Ocean in 2001 with adventurers Ben Kozel, Colin Angus and Remy Quinter; and riding on horseback from Mongolia to Hungary which spanned over three years (2004–2007) and 10,000 km; He has also traveled into North Korea, among other places.

== Books and films ==
Cope has authored books about his journeys including Off the Rails: Moscow to Beijing by Bike (2003), and On the Trail of Genghis Khan: An Epic Journey Through the Land of the Nomads (2013).

Cope has also made films about his journeys including as director and cinematographer of Off the Rails: On the Back Roads to Beijing (2002); and filmed The Yenisey Expedition co-produced by National Geographic Channel. Cope directed and filmed a four-hour program for ZDF and ARTE channels in Europe titled On the Trail of Genghis Khan which received backing from Screen Australia. This series was screened in Europe in February 2010 on German/French channel ARTE. Cope's six-part documentary series premiered on Australian TV channel ABC2 on Wednesday 28 July 2010.

== Awards and honours ==
- 2000 "Spirit of Adventure Award", Australian Geographic
- 2001 "Young Australian Adventurer of the Year", Australian Geographic
- 2002 "Best Adventure Film", for the film Off The Rails. Mountain and Adventure Film Festival, Graz, Austria
- 2006 "Australian Adventurer of the Year", Australian Geographic
- 2008 "Adventurers of the Year", National Geographic Adventure, one of fifteen
- 2010 "Special Prize of the Jury", for the film The Trail of Genghis Khan, Mountain and Adventure Film Festival, Graz, Austria
- 2013 "Grand Prize", Banff Mountain Book Festival, for The Trail of Genghis Khan
- 2015 "Mongolian Tourism Excellency Medal" by the minister for tourism and environment. Also officially inaugurated as tourism envoy for Mongolia

== See also ==
- Paul Salopek
