= Gougeon =

Gougeon is a surname. Notable people with the surname include:

- Denis Gougeon (born 1951), Canadian composer and music educator
- Jan Gougeon, American sailboat designer
  - Gougeon 32, American catamaran design by Jan Gougeon
- Joel Gougeon (born 1943), American politician
