= Colin Angus =

Colin Angus may refer to:

- Colin Angus (explorer), Canadian explorer
- Colin Angus (musician), member of the British electronic music group The Shamen
