= Sym (river) =

Sym Сым
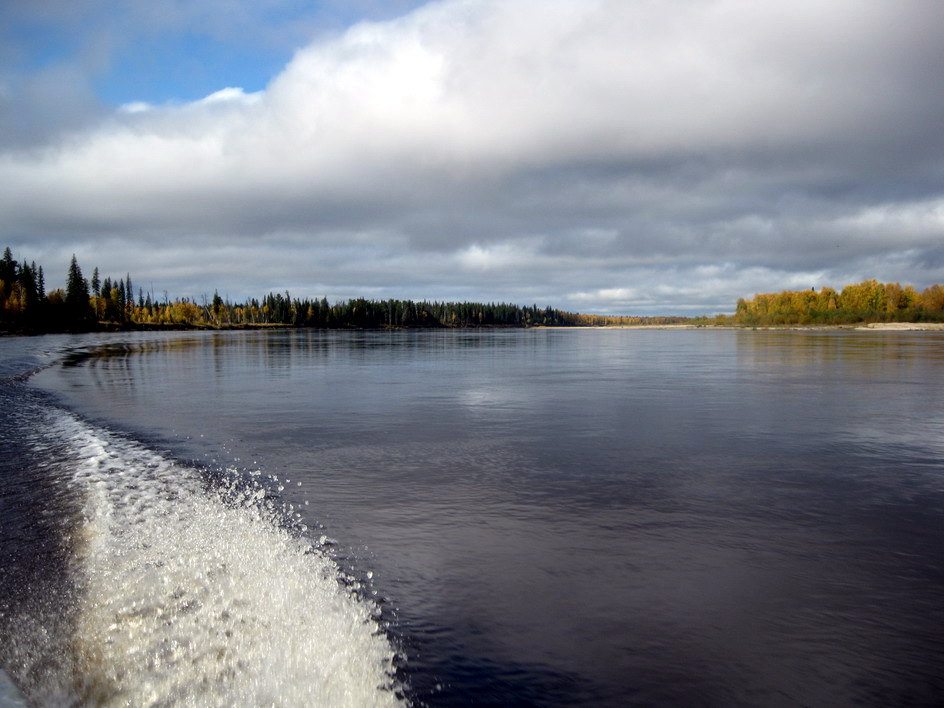
- View of the river

- Mouth location in Krasnoyarsk Krai, Russia

Location
- Country: Turukhan District, Krasnoyarsk Krai, Russia

Physical characteristics
- Source
  - location: West Siberian Plain swamps
  - coordinates: 61°25′54″N 86°1′4″E
  - elevation: 180 m (590 ft)
- Mouth: Yenisey
  - coordinates: 60°17′29″N 90°6′0″E
  - elevation: 43 m (141 ft)
- Length: 694 km (431 mi)
- Basin size: 31,600 km^{2} (12,200 sq mi)

Basin features
- Progression: Yenisey→ Kara Sea

The Sym (Russian: Сым) is a left, western tributary of the Yenisey in Krasnoyarsk Krai, Russia. It is 694 kilometres (431 mi) long, and has a drainage basin of 31,600 square kilometres (12,200 sq mi). It is navigable about 265 km (165 mi) upstream from its mouth.

== Course ==
The Sym begins at a height of 180 m (590 ft) in a swampy area of the West Siberian Plain. It flows roughly southeastwards across flat and often boggy areas, forming increasingly wide meanders. About 50 kilometres (31 mi) before the mouth it bends and flows in a roughly ENE direction, finally joining the left bank of the Yenisey between Yarzevo and Krivlyak.

The river freezes in October or early November and stays frozen until May. Its main tributaries are the Alsym, Kukocha, Oksym and Kolchum from the right and the Kidenches from the left. The settlement of Maiskoye is by the Kolchum.

== History ==
Historically the Sym was first reached by Ket serving men in 1605, while a detachment from Mangazeya ascended the Yenisei to its confluence with the Sym in 1610.

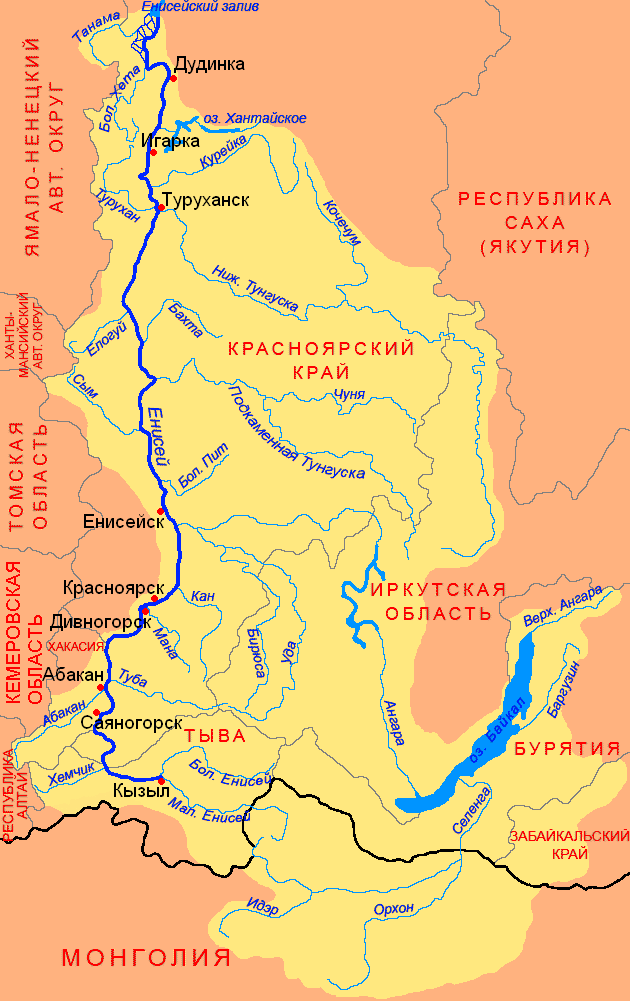
Basin of the Yenisei

== See also ==
- List of rivers of Russia
- Ket River
