= Julie Angus =

Canadian ocean rower and cyclist

Julie Angus (née Wafaei, born 1974) is a Canadian rower, adventurer, writer, cyclist and entrepreneur. She is married to the explorer Colin Angus.

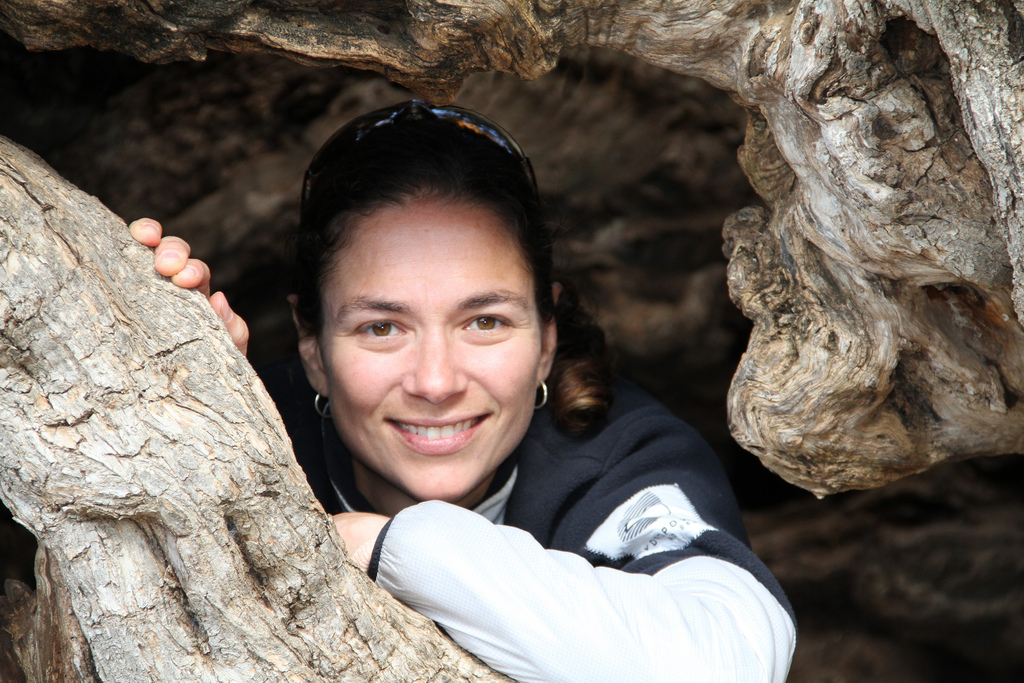
Julie in an ancient olive tree

She has an undergraduate degree from McMaster University in biology and psychology, which she obtained in 1997, and a Master of Science degree in molecular biology from the University of Victoria. She worked in venture capital, technology transfer and business development, developing therapeutics for genetic ailments and cardiovascular disease, before pursuing exploration and writing. In 2005-06, she became the first woman to row across the Atlantic Ocean from mainland to mainland; she later chronicled the expedition in her 2008 book Rowboat in a Hurricane: My Amazing Journey Across a Changing Atlantic Ocean. She travelled 7,000 km from Scotland to Syria by bicycle and rowboat and organised a National Geographic sponsored expedition to research the history of the olive tree. She received the University of Victoria Distinguished Alumni Award in 2018.

== Recognition ==
- Adventurer of the Year Award 2007 from National Geographic Adventure
- Listed as One of Canada's Greatest Women Explorers by Canadian Geographic in 2016a
- Awarded University of Victoria Distinguished Alumni Award in 2018
- John P. McGovern Lectureship Award in 2017
