= Yenisey Range =

Mountain range in Russia

- Енисейский кряж
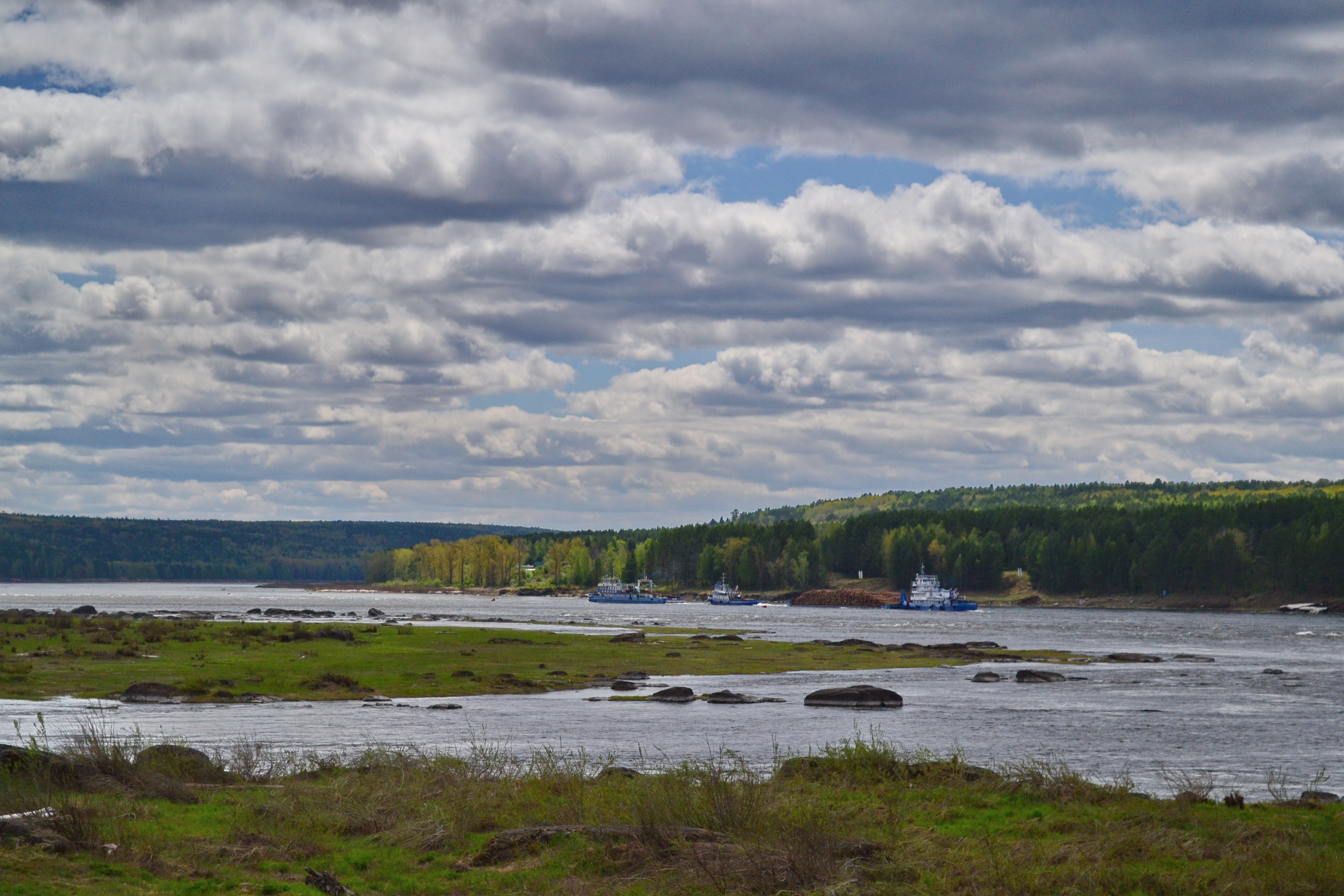
- View of the Kazachinsky rapids

Highest point
- Peak: Yenashimsky Polkan
- Elevation: 1,104 m (3,622 ft)
- Coordinates: 59°30′N 93°15′E

Dimensions
- Length: 720 km (450 mi) NNW/SSE
- Width: 200 km (120 mi) ENE/WSW

Geography
- Location within Krasnoyarsk Krai
- Location: Krasnoyarsk Krai, Russia
- Parent range: Central Siberian Plateau

Geology
- Orogeny: Alpine orogeny
- Rock type(s): Gneiss, schist, limestone

The Yenisey Range (Russian: Енисейский кряж) is a range of mountains in Siberia. Administratively the range is part of the Krasnoyarsk Krai of the Russian Federation. The nearest town is Severo-Yeniseysk.

The mountains have granite intrusions that are associated with gold deposits, as well as iron ore, bauxite, magnesite and talc.

== Geography ==
The Yenisey Range is a subrange of the Central Siberian Plateau. It is a relatively low range, cut across by swampy intermontane basins. The range stretches along the right bank of the Yenisey in the southwestern edge of the plateau, between the valley of the Kan River in the south and the Stony Tunguska in the north, beyond which rises the Tunguska Plateau.

The northern part of the range is the widest and has the highest elevations. The highest point of the range is 1,104 metres (3,622 ft) high Yenashimsky Polkan, located in the upper course of small rivers Yenashimo and Chirimba. Another high summit is 1,052 metres (3,451 ft) high Lysaya. The Angara River flows across the area of the range to join the Yenisey off its western slopes. The Big Pit River has its sources in the range.

== Flora ==
The slopes of the mountains are smooth and are covered with taiga. The tops of the higher peaks are bald with clumps of small shrubs and areas of scree.

== See also ==
- List of mountains and hills of Russia
- Yenisey Fold Belt
