= Yenisey Fold Belt =

Coordinates: 59°N 94°E

The Yenisey Fold Belt is a fold belt in Russia that divides the Siberian craton from the West Siberian basin, extending about 700 kilometres (430 mi), with NW-SE strike. This belt is divided into northern and southern regions by the Angara fault which has left slip. Much of the rock was formed by Neoproterozoic accretion.

North of the fault, the area is made up of thrust sheets divided into three primarily Neoproterozoic terranes, the East Angara, Central Angara and the Isakov. The Isakov Terrane is a series of imbricated volcanic and sedimentary units containing ophiolite, which is underlain be volcanics, metamorphics and sedimentary rock. Unconformably overlying it is the Vorogovka group, a series of basins which were thrust over the Isakov. This terrane overlies the Central Angara terrane, having been thrust eastward over it. The Central Angara Terrane is intruded by alkaline granites with NNW trend in the elongated bodies. The Eastern Terrane lacks signs of magmatism, instead it is made up of overriding late Neoproterozoic deposits above older groups, most of which are intruded by granites.

South of the Angara fault, there are two allochthonous units. One is the Angara-Kan micro-craton, which is sometimes considered separate from the fold belt. This terrane is formed of Paleoproterozoic granulite amphibolite facies, and the other is the Predivinsk terrane which is mostly Neoproterozoic island-arc accretion. The Angara-Kan terrane also includes two pyroxene plagioclase and one garnet-biotite-sillimanite-cordierite gneisses.

The late Riphean strata of the Sukhopit, Tungusik, and Oslyan series formed on along a continental margin of open ocean followed by a back-arc basin from 1050 to 1150 million years ago. From around 860-880 MA until 700-630 MA, the collision of many of the terranes occurred during the Baikal orogeny, which was the period of much of the accretion, thrusting, and metamorphism. This period is also when granitic intrusions occurred.

== See also ==
- Yenisei Range
