= Khantayka =

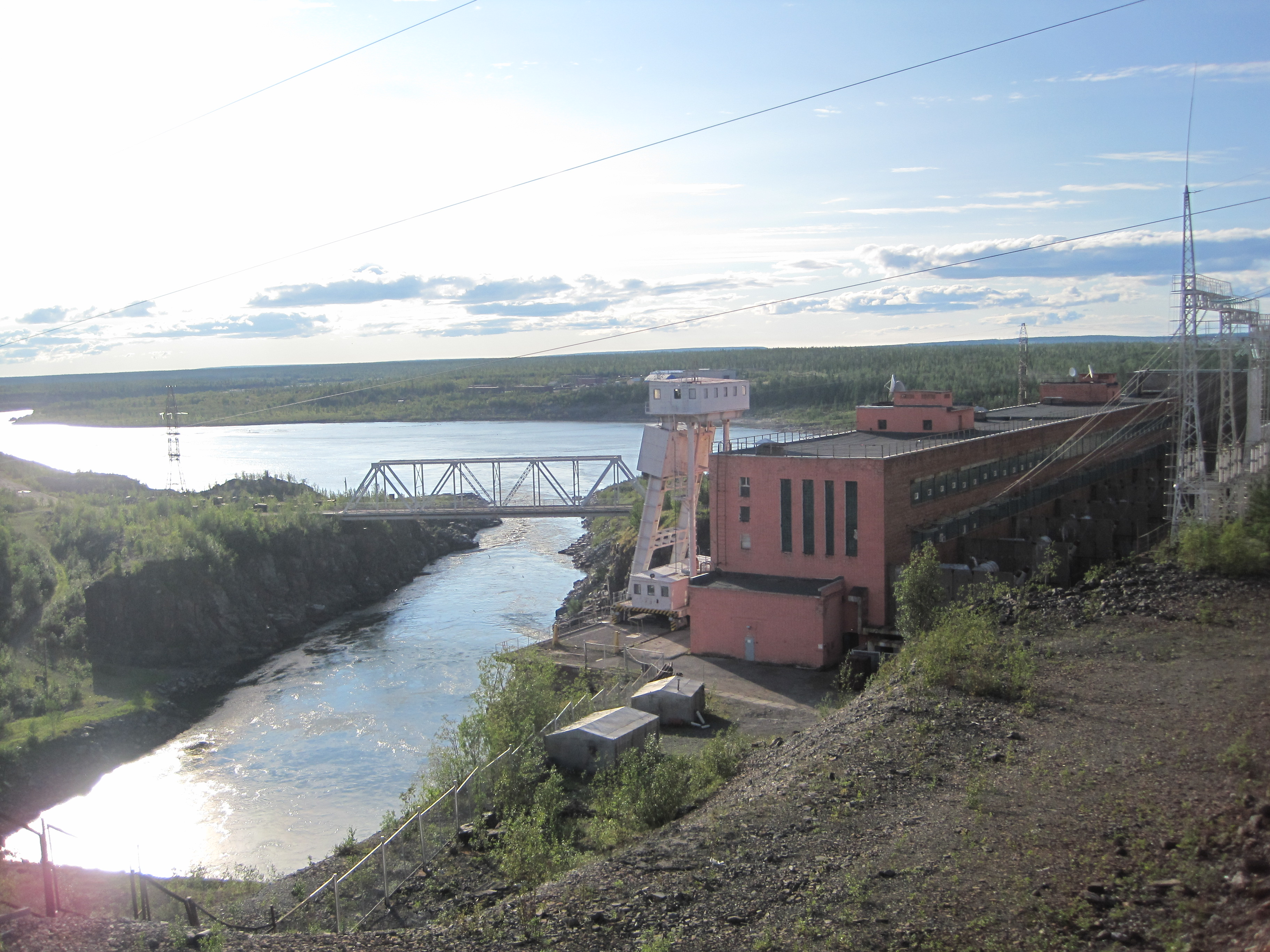

- Mouth location in Krasnoyarsk Krai, Russia

Physical characteristics
- Source: Lake Maloye Khantayskoye
  - location: Putorana Massif
  - coordinates: 68°20′45″N 89°22′41″E
  - elevation: 62 m (203 ft)
- Mouth: Yenisey
  - coordinates: 68°06′50″N 86°33′00″E
  - elevation: 61 m (200 ft)
- Length: 174 km (108 mi)
- Basin size: 30,700 km^{2} (11,900 sq mi)

Basin features
- Progression: Yenisey→ Kara Sea

The Khantayka (Russian: Хантайка) is a river in Krasnoyarsk Krai, Russia. It is a right tributary of the Yenisey. It is 174 kilometres (108 mi) long, and has a drainage basin of 30,700 square kilometres (11,900 sq mi). The source of the Khantayka is Lake Maloye Khantayskoye in the Putorana Massif. It flows through the Ust-Khantayka Reservoir.

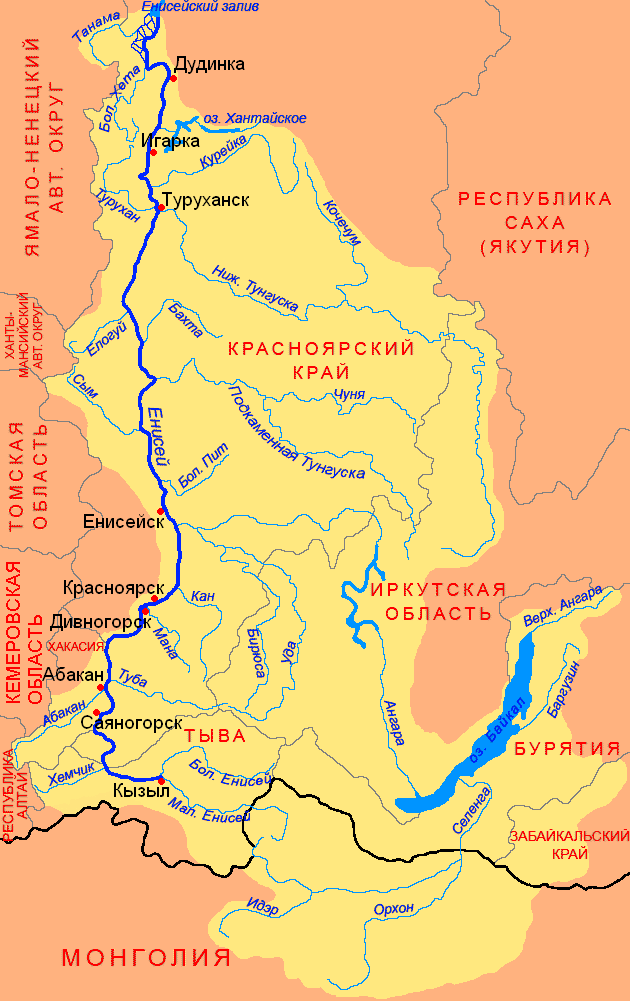
Basin of the Yenisei

== See also ==
- List of rivers of Russia
