= Bolshoy Pit =

River in Krasnoyarsk Krai, Russia

Bolshoy Pit Большой Пит
- Mouth location in Krasnoyarsk Krai, Russia

Location
- Country: Severo-Yeniseysky District, Krasnoyarsk Krai, Russia

Physical characteristics
- Source
  - location: Yenisey Range
  - coordinates: 60°6′49″N 94°57′4″E
  - elevation: 550 m (1,800 ft)
- Mouth: Yenisey
  - coordinates: 59°1′15″N 91°41′47″E
  - elevation: 61 m (200 ft)
- Length: 415 km (258 mi)
- Basin size: 21,700 km^{2} (8,400 sq mi)

Basin features
- Progression: Yenisey→ Kara Sea

The Bolshoy Pit (Russian: Большой Пит - "Great Pit") is a river in Krasnoyarsk Krai, Russia. It is a right hand tributary of the Yenisey.

The Bolshoy Pit is 415 kilometres (258 mi) long, and the area of its basin is 21,700 square kilometres (8,400 mi^{2}). The lower reaches of the Bolshoy Pit are navigable during the spring flood between May and June up to the village Bryanka, 184 km (114 mi) from the river's mouth.

== Course ==
The Bolshoy Pit has its source in the eastern slopes of the Yenisey Range, part of the western side of the Central Siberian Plateau. Its source is not far from the source of the Velmo, a tributary of the Podkamennaya Tunguska. After 15 km (9.3 mi), it is joined by the Maly Pit. Flowing southwestwards across the taiga of the mountainous region, it cuts across the main ridge of the Yenisey Range through a deep gorge. Then it bends and flows roughly northwestwards in the last nearly 100 kilometres (62 mi) of its course.

The Bolshoy Pit joins the right bank of the Yenisey 5 kilometres (3.1 mi) downriver from Ust-Pit village and 1,880 kilometres (1,170 mi) from the mouth of the Yenisey. The confluence is located between the mouths of the Angara and Podkamennaya Tunguska. The river freezes in mid-November and stays frozen until mid-May.

The main tributaries of the Bolshoy Pit are the Chirimba, Panimba, Veduga, Lendakha and Kamenka on the right and the Gorbilok and Sukhoy Pit on the left.

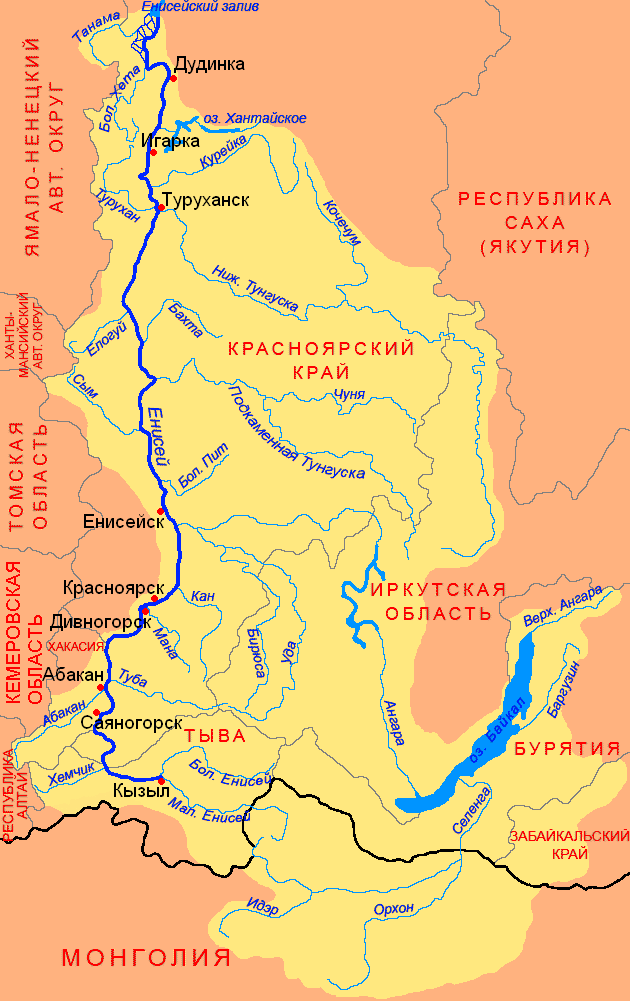
Basin of the Yenisei

== See also ==
- List of rivers of Russia
