= Gougeon 32 =

Sailboat class

Development
- Designer: Jan Gougeon
- Location: United States
- Year: 1990
- No. built: 14
- Builder: Gougeon Brothers
- Name: Gougeon 32

Boat
- Displacement: 1,100 lb (499 kg)
- Draft: 4.25 ft (1.30 m)

Hull
- Type: Catamaran
- Construction: Fiberglass with balsa and foam cores
- LOA: 32.00 ft (9.75 m)
- LWL: 32.00 ft (9.75 m)
- Beam: 8.3 ft (2.5 m)
- Engine: 8 hp (6 kW) outboard motor

Hull appendages
- Keel: two daggerboards
- Ballast: 1,200 lb (544 kg) water
- Rudder: two transom-mounted rudders

Rig
- Rig type: Bermuda rig

Sails
- Sailplan: Fractional rigged sloop
- Mainsail area: 187 sq ft (17.4 m^{2})
- Jib/genoa area: 109 sq ft (10.1 m^{2})
- Total sail area: 296 sq ft (27.5 m^{2})

The Gougeon 32 is an American trailerable catamaran that was designed by Jan Gougeon and first built in 1990.

== Production ==
The design was built by Gougeon Brothers in Bay City, Michigan, United States. The company completed 14 examples of the type between 1990 and 1992, but it is now out of production.

== Development ==
Gougeon Brothers is a composite manufacturing company, that has built many products from composite material and also developed their own materials and processes. By 1990 the company had built many custom-built racing sailboats, but had never embarked on a mass-market production boat design before.

The Gougeon 32 was a project that the company embarked upon as a complementary effort while their wind turbine blade manufacturing was ramping up after three years out of production, following the wind turbine market's 1986 crash. The sailboat design was commenced in 1990 as an intended production commercial product that would also be used to development new composite materials and techniques.

The boat's design goals were, "a lightweight, trailerable catamaran that was fast, fun to sail, had weekend accommodations for 2 or 3 and was priced below $35,000." The design was intended to reach a break-even point at a production rate of two boats per week and would be profitable at three boats per week. The design challenge was to build a boat of this size that could be transported on a trailer behind a mid-sized car, a requirement that restricted the design to a towed weight of a maximum of 2,200 lb (998 kg).

The design used a new manufacturing technique: single vacuum bag moulded epoxy resin laminate construction, conventional polyester gelcoat and reinforcing fibers fully wetted-out mechanically on a rolling machine. It used low-temperature cured epoxy resin with long cure times to achieve the desired finished physical properties. This process became the company's Pro-Set process, which has been commercially successful.

In 1992 the company sold its wind turbine blade manufacturing business and terminated the catamaran production at the same time, having produced only 14 boats and never achieved full series production.

== Design ==
The Gougeon 32 is a recreational sailboat, built predominantly of fiberglass with balsa and foam cores, with aluminum spars. It has a fractional sloop rig with a fully battened mainsail, a jib and provisions for a light wind drifter sail. The two hulls have plumb stems, vertical transoms, transom-hung rudders controlled by a central tiller and a daggerboard in each hull. It displaces 1,100 lb (499 kg) and carries 1,200 lb (544 kg) of flooding water ballast, 600 lb (272 kg) in each hull. The ballast is drained for road transport.

The boat has a draft of 4.25 ft (1.30 m) with the daggerboards extended, allowing beaching or ground transportation on a trailer with the boards retracted.

The boat is normally fitted with a small outboard motor for docking and maneuvering. The fuel tank holds 6 U.S. gallons (23 L; 5.0 imp gal).

The design has sleeping accommodation for two adults and two children. The cabin floor is padded and can be used for additional sleeping space, as can the open cockpit. The interior seating is made from fiberglass. The galley includes a small sink and a single-burner propane stove for cooking. The head is a portable type. A bow trampoline provides space and also deflects spray when sailing.

The mast is a rotating design, hinged for ground transport, folding forward over the towing vehicle. The mast is supported by a single set of shrouds and running backstays. The mainsail may be reefed by rolling around the rotating boom, while the jib has roller furling. There is a full-width mainsheet traveler and the mainsheet itself has an 8:1 mechanical advantage.

== Operational history ==
The 14 boats in service have won numerous races.

In the 2017 Race to Alaska, Russell Brown skippered his Gougeon 32, Incognito, to first place in the solo class.

In a review Richard Sherwood described the design, "the Gougeon 32 is a big, fast, stable catamaran that can be sailed by one or two and will sleep two adults and two children. In addition, you can camp out in the cockpit. Six hundred pounds of water ballast may be placed in each hull for stability, but may be drained for trailering.

== See also ==
- List of sailing boat types

Similar sailboats

- MacGregor 26
- Hunter 27 Edge
