= Yenisei =

Fifth-longest river in the world

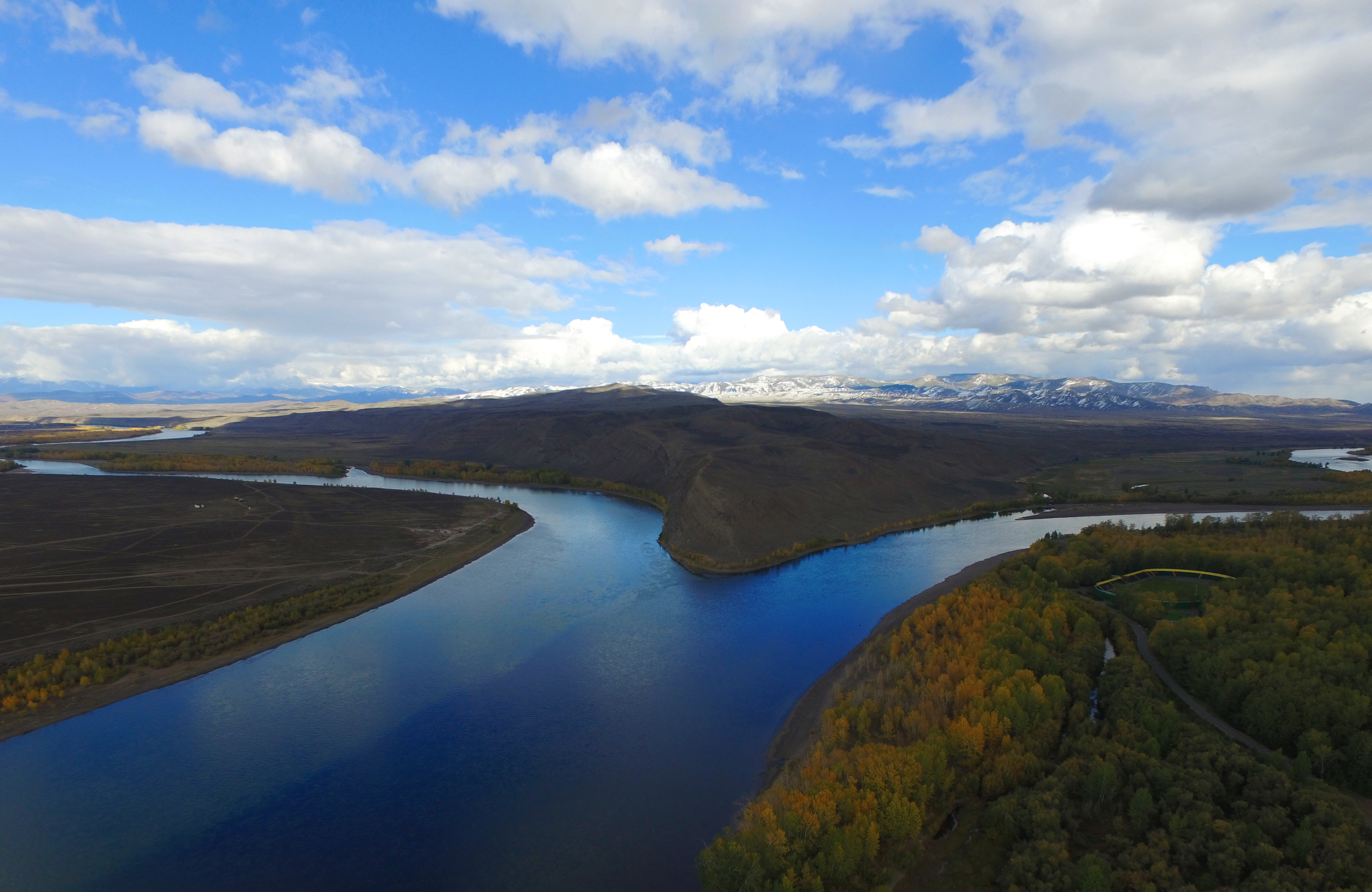
- The confluence of the rivers Kaa-Khem and Piy-Khem near Kyzyl

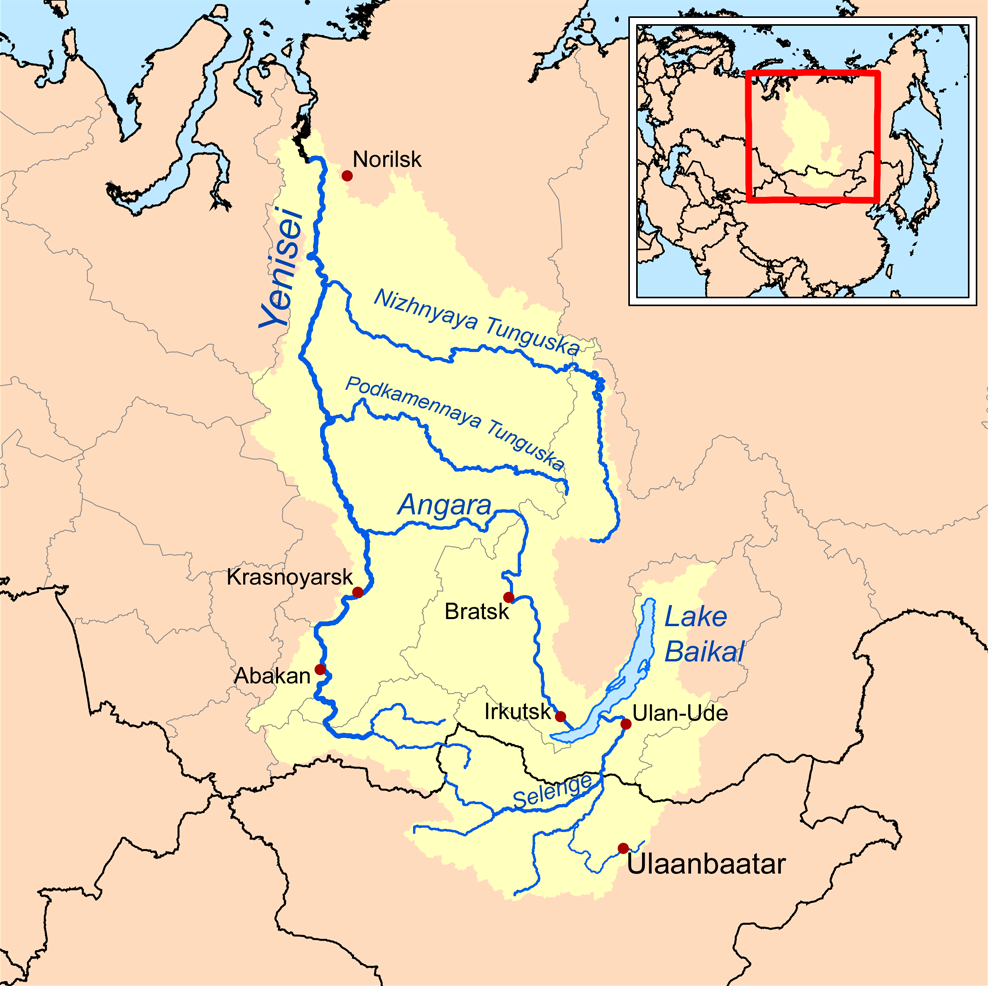
- The Yenisey basin, including Lake Baikal
- Etymology: From either Old Kyrgyz Эне-Сай (Ene-Sai, 'mother river') or Evenki Ионэсси (Ionəssi, 'big water')
- Native name: Енисей (Russian); Улуг-Хем (Tuvan); Ким суғ (Khakas); Ендэгӣ (Evenki); ям' (Nenets)

Location
- Country: Mongolia, Russia
- Region: Tuva, Krasnoyarsk Krai, Khakassia, Irkutsk Oblast, Buryatia, Zabaykalsky Krai
- Cities: Kyzyl, Shagonar, Sayanogorsk, Abakan, Divnogorsk, Krasnoyarsk, Yeniseysk, Lesosibirsk, Igarka, Dudinka

Physical characteristics
- Source: Mungaragiyn-Gol
  - location: ridge Dod-Taygasyn-Noroo, Mongolia
  - coordinates: 50°43′46″N 98°39′49″E
  - elevation: 3,351 m (10,994 ft)
- 2nd source: The most distant source: Yenisey-Angara-Selenga-Ider system
  - location: Khangai Mountains
  - coordinates: 47°54′47″N 97°57′1″E
  - elevation: 2,850 m (9,350 ft)
- Mouth: Yenisey Gulf
  - location: Arctic Ocean, Russia
  - coordinates: 71°50′0″N 82°40′0″E
- Length: 3,487 km (2,167 mi)
- Basin size: 2,554,482 km^{2} (986,291 mi^{2}) to 2,580,000 km^{2} (1,000,000 mi^{2})
- Width
  - minimum: 90 m (300 ft)
  - maximum: 5,000 m (16,000 ft)
- Depth
  - minimum: 5 m (16 ft)
  - average: 14 m (46 ft)
  - maximum: 66 m (217 ft)
- Discharge
  - location: Igarka, Russia (Basin size 2,440,000 km^{2} (940,000 sq mi); 2,442,735 km^{2} (943,145 sq mi))
  - average: (Period of data: 1971–2015)19,499 m^{3}/s (688,600 cu ft/s) 18,050 m^{3}/s (637,000 cu ft/s) (Period of data: 1999–2008) 636 km^{3}/a (20,200 m^{3}/s)
  - minimum: 3,120 m^{3}/s (110,000 cu ft/s)
  - maximum: 112,000 m^{3}/s (4,000,000 cu ft/s)
- Discharge
  - location: Dudinka, Russia (Basin size 2,540,000 km^{2} (980,000 sq mi))
  - average: (Period of data: 1999–2008) 673 km^{3}/a (21,300 m^{3}/s)
- Discharge
  - location: Yenisey Gulf (near mouth)
  - average: (Period of data: 1984–2018)637 km^{3}/a (20,200 m^{3}/s) (Period of data: 1940–2017) 588 km^{3}/a (18,600 m^{3}/s) 620 km^{3}/a (20,000 m^{3}/s)
  - minimum: 2,700 m^{3}/s (95,000 cu ft/s)
  - maximum: 190,000 m^{3}/s (6,700,000 cu ft/s)

Basin features
- Tributaries
  - right: Angara, Podkamennaya Tunguska, Nizhnyaya Tunguska

The Yenisei or Yenisey (Note: Pronunciation: /ˌjɛnɪˈseɪ/, YEN-iss-AY Russian: Енисе́й, pronounced [jɪnʲɪˈsʲej] Mongolian: Горлог мөрөн, romanized: Gorlog mörön, pronounced [ˈɢɔrɮɔɢ ˈmɵrɵŋ] Buryat: Горлог мүрэн, romanized: Gorlog müren Tuvan: Улуг-Хем, romanized: Ulug-Xem Khakas: Ким суғ, romanized: Kim suğ. Also romanised as Jenisej) is the fifth-longest river system in the world, and the largest to drain into the Arctic Ocean. Beginning in Mungaragiyn-gol in Mongolia, it follows a northerly course through the Krasnoyarsk Dam before draining into the Yenisei Gulf in the Kara Sea. Its basin includes Lake Baikal, the world's deepest lake. The Yenisei divides the Western Siberian Plain in the west from the Central Siberian Plateau to the east; it drains a large part of central Siberia. Its delta is formed between the Gyda Peninsula and the Taymyr Peninsula. The Yenisei is the central river of three large Siberian rivers that flow into the Arctic Ocean (the other two being the Ob and the Lena). The maximum depth of the Yenisei is 61 metres (200 ft) and the average depth is 14 metres (45 ft).

== Etymology ==
The first written mention of the Yenisei River, as "Kem", dates back to the 7th century in Tang dynasty China, at the time of contact with Yenisei Kyrgyz of this region. The word Jian Shui (劔水; "Jian River") appears in the Book of Zhou, vol. 50, and the History of the Northern Dynasties, vol. 99, while Jian He (劍河; "Jian River") appears in the New Book of Tang, vol. 217. In addition, Qian He (謙河; "Qian River") is found in the 14th-century the History of Yuan, vol. 63. These contacts were made by the Chinese as they approached the upper Yenisei River from the south. The characters jian (劔 or 劍) and qian (謙) have been compared to Käm in Orkhon inscriptions from the 8th century. The term Kem كيم is also found in the 13th‒14th-century Oirat Biography in the Jami' al-Tawarikh. (Note: Furthermore, 18th-century Chinese maps show ᡴᡝ᠊ᠮ᠊ᠠ ᠪᡳ᠊ᡵᠠ Kem bira “Kem River” (the Kangxi Imperial Atlas of China (康煕皇輿全覧圖) in 1717), ᡴᡝ᠊ᠮ᠊ᠠ ᡳ ᠪᠣ᠊ᠮ Kem-i bom "Cliffs of the Kem River" (the Yongzheng Atlas (雍正十排圖) in 1727 or 1728), 伊克穆必拉 (yeke Kem bira) "Great Kem River" (the Ch'ien-lung Atlas (乾隆内府輿圖) in 1769).)

The etymology of Käm is not believed to be of Turkic origin, and although a Samoyed derivation has been proposed, its precise origins remain unclear.

Today, the word survives only in Sayan Turkic languages: in Tuvan as xem (хем,) meaning "river", and in its sister language, Tofa, as hem (hем,) also meaning "river". These languages are considered to have had close contact with those mentioned above in ancient times. Additionally, there are just over 50 river names containing the suffix -kem -кем in the Altai Republic, and the term Kim (Ким) as in Kim suğ (Ким суғ), meaning "Yenisei River", barely exists in Khakas. All of these instances are confined to the region in and around the present-day Republic of Tuva.

Meanwhile, in the 17th century, Russians reached the lower part of the Yenisei River from the northwest; along the way, by 1600, the Tobolsk Cossacks built Fort Mangazeya by the Taz River. It is believed that the name of the Yenisei River was transmitted, either directly or indirectly, from Samoyed-speaking peoples in the region with whom the Russians had contact. This contact eventually led to the adoption of the name "Yenisei", with a Russian accent.

Additionally, by the end of the 16th century, the Yenisei River was already known to Dutch navigators, who referred to it as "Gilissi", "Gelissi", or "Geniscea", among other names. Although the exact spelling varied, these are phonetically similar to "Yenisei". In particular, the modern Dutch pronunciation of "Geniscea" as [xɛnisə] is quite close to "Yenisei". The term "Yenisei" (Енисей) appeared in Russian literature slightly later, around 1600, in the form that is still used today. Unlike in Dutch, the Russian spelling has been relatively stable since the 17th century, with only minor variations such as "Yenisei a" (Енисея) or "Yenisya" (Енися).

The etymology of "Yenisei" remains unclear. Renowned linguist Max Vasmer, for instance, has suggested that the Nganasan word "Jentajea", the Enets "Jeddosi", and the Selkup "N'andesi", all meaning "Yenisei River", might correspond to unidentified Samoyed languages, probably quoted Matthias Castrén's vocabulary. V. K. Nikonov has proposed that the word could derive from "iondessi" (иондесси), meaning "big river" in Selkup, Khanty, or even Evenki. More recently, some have speculated that "Yenisei" is a compound word of unconfirmed Old Kyrgyz (or inspired by Tuvan language?) ene (эне), meaning "great-grandmother; nanny" + say (сай), meaning "gravel; ford".

However, the above considerations, except Vasmer's, remain speculative false etymologies, as they do not refer to the reliable modern dictionaries of the respective languages. Researchers are encouraged to conduct more detailed studies based on proper contemporary linguistic sources and historical documents.

== Geography ==
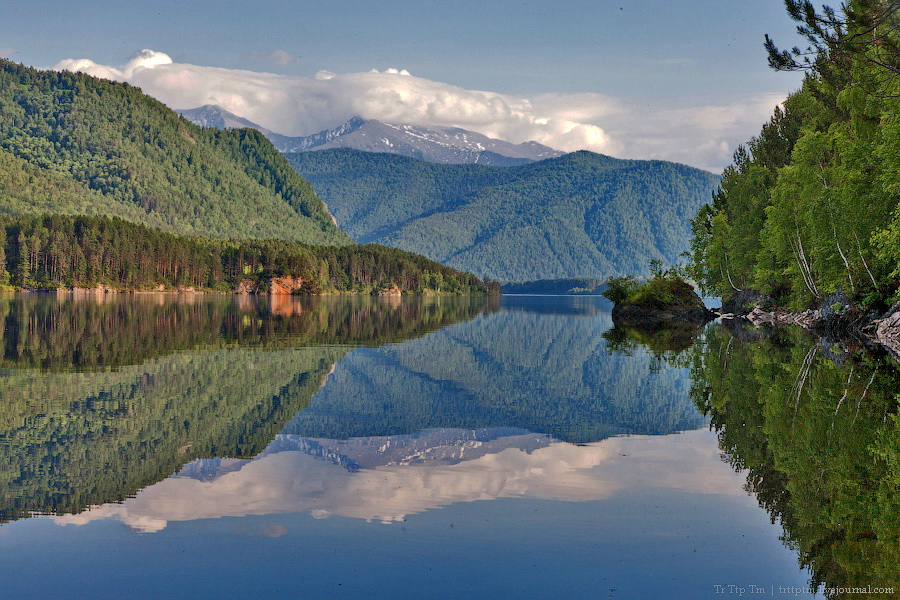
The Yenisei flowing through the Shushensky Forest

The Yenisei proper is 3,487 km (2,167 mi) long, measured from the confluence of its source rivers the Great Yenisei and Little Yenisei at Kyzyl to its mouth in the Kara Sea. From the source of its tributary the Selenga, it is 5,075 km (3,153 mi) long. It has a drainage basin of 2,580,000 km^{2} (1,000,000 sq mi). The Yenisei flows through the Russian federal subjects Tuva, Khakassia and Krasnoyarsk Krai. The city of Krasnoyarsk is situated far upstream on the Yenisei, and the industrial city of Norilsk is nearby on the Arctic Ocean's Taymyr Peninsula.

=== Tributaries ===
The largest tributaries of the Yenisei are, from source to mouth:

- Little Yenisey (left)
- Great Yenisey (right)
- Khemchik (left)
- Kantegir (left)
- Abakan (left)
- Tuba (right)
- Mana (right)
- Bazaikha (right)
- Kacha (left)
- Kan (right)
- Angara (right)
- Kem (left)
- Bolshoy Pit (right)
- Sym (left)
- Dubches (left)
- Podkamennaya Tunguska (right)
- Bakhta (right)
- Yeloguy (left)
- Nizhnyaya Tunguska (right)
- Turukhan (left)
- Kureyka (right)
- Khantayka (right)
- Bolshaya Kheta (left)
- Tanama (left)

== Lake Baikal ==
A significant feature of the Upper Yenisei is Lake Baikal, the deepest and oldest lake in the world.

== Brekhovskie Islands ==
The Brekhovskie Islands (Russian-language article: Бреховские острова) lie in the Yenisei estuary and have an area of some 1,400,000 hectares. They provide a wetland habitat for rare and endangered birds and are an internationally important nesting and breeding area for several types of waterfowl. The most north-easterly of the islands, Nosonovskij Ostrov ("Nose Island") was visited by Fridtjof Nansen in 1913.

== Flora and fauna ==
The Yenisei basin (excluding Lake Baikal and lakes of the Khantayka headwaters) is home to 55 native fish species, including two endemics: Gobio sibiricus (a gobionine cyprinid) and Thymallus nigrescens (a grayling). The grayling is restricted to Khövsgöl Nuur and its tributaries. Most fish found in the Yenisei basin are relatively widespread Euro-Siberian or Siberian species, such as northern pike (Esox lucius), common roach (Rutilus rutilus), common dace (Leuciscus leuciscus), Siberian sculpin (Cottus poecilopus), European perch (Perca fluviatilis) and Prussian carp (Carassius gibelio). The basin is also home to many salmonids (trout, whitefish, charr, graylings, taimen and relatives) and the Siberian sturgeon (Acipenser baerii).

The Yenisei valley is habitat for numerous flora and fauna, with Siberian pine and Siberian larch being notable tree species. In prehistoric times Scots pine, Pinus sylvestris, was abundant in the Yenisei valley c. 6000 BC. There are also numerous bird species present in the watershed, including, for example, the hooded crow, Corvus cornix.

=== Taimyr reindeer herd ===
The Taimyr herd of tundra reindeer (Rangifer tarandus sibiricus), the largest reindeer herd in the world, migrates to winter grazing ranges along the Yenisei . It had an estimated 800,000-850,000 individuals as of 2010, but has peaked at over one million.

== Navigation ==
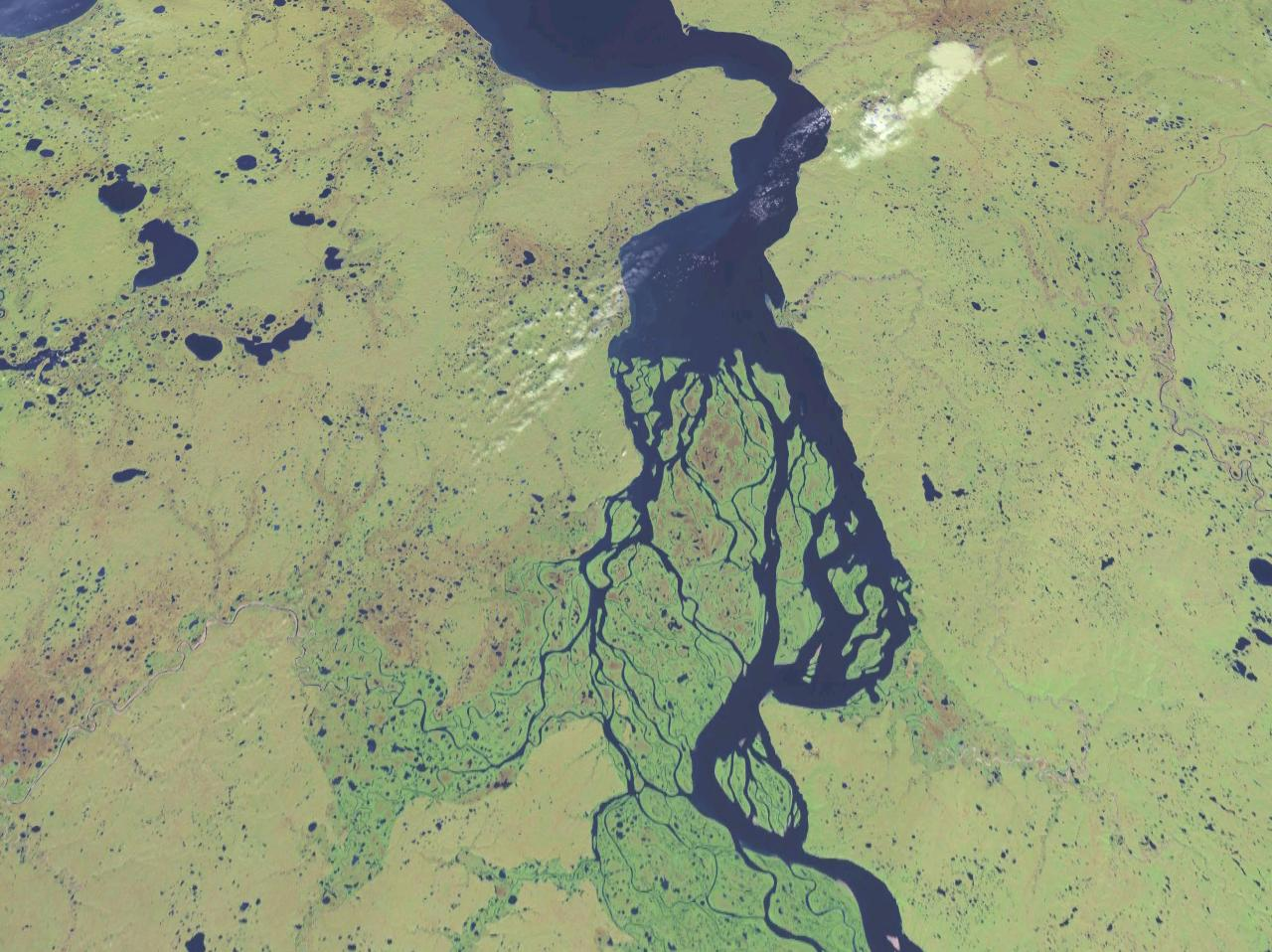
The Jenissej river gulf

River steamers first came to the Yenisei River in 1864 and were brought in from the Netherlands and the United Kingdom across the icy Kara Sea. One was the steamer Nikolai. The steamship Thames attempted to explore the river, overwintered in 1876, but was damaged in the ice and eventually wrecked in the river. Success came with the steamers Frazer, Express in 1878 and, the next year, Moscow hauling supplies in and wheat out. The Dalman reached Yeniseisk in 1881.

Imperial Russia placed river steamers on the massive river in an attempt to free up communication with land-locked Siberia. One, St. Nicholas took the future Tsar Nicholas II on his voyage to Siberia, and later conveyed Vladimir Lenin to prison.

Engineers attempted to place river steamers in regular service on the river during the building of the Trans-Siberian Railway. The boats were needed to bring in the rails, engines and supplies. Captain Joseph Wiggins sailed the Orestes with rail in 1893. However, the sea and river route proved very difficult with several ships lost at sea and on the river. Both the Ob and Yenisei mouths feed into very long inlets, several hundred kilometres in length, which are shallow, ice bound and prone to high winds and thus treacherous for navigation. After the completion of the railway, river traffic reduced to only local service as the Arctic route and long river proved much too indirect a route.

The first recreation team to navigate the Yenisei 's entire length, including its violent upper tributary in Mongolia, was an Australian-Canadian expedition completed in September 2001. Ben Kozel, Tim Cope, Colin Angus and Remy Quinter were on this team. Both Kozel and Angus wrote books detailing this expedition, and a documentary was produced for National Geographic Television.

A canal inclined plane was built on the river in 1985 at the Krasnoyarsk Dam.

== History ==
Nomadic tribes such as the Ket people and the Yugh people have lived along the banks of the Yenisei since ancient times, and this region is the location of the Yeniseian language family. The Ket, numbering about 1000, are the only survivors today of those who originally lived throughout central southern Siberia near the river banks. Their extinct relatives included the Kotts, Assans, Arins, Baikots and Pumpokols who lived further upriver to the south. The modern Ket lived in the eastern middle areas of the river before being assimilated politically into Russia during the 17th through 19th centuries.

Some of the earliest known evidence of Turkic origins was found in the Yenisei Valley in the form of stelae, stone monoliths and memorial tablets dating from between the seventh and ninth centuries AD, along with some documents that were found in China's Xinjiang region. The written evidence gathered from these sources tells of battles fought between the Turks and the Chinese and other legends. There are also examples of Uyghur poetry, though most have survived only in Chinese translation.

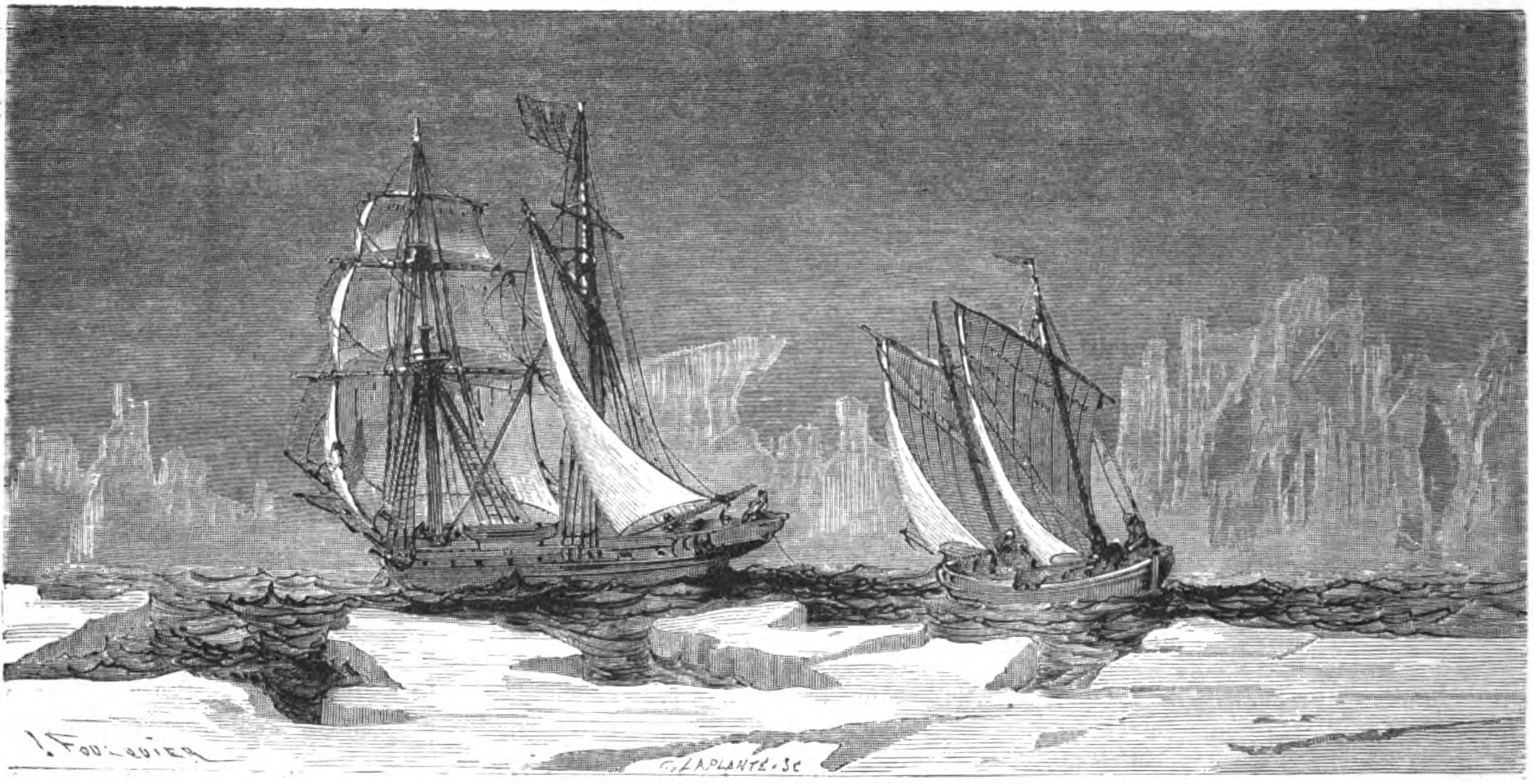
The schooner MV Iermak and the MV Embryo on their ill-fated 1862 voyage of exploration to the gulf of the Yenissei under Krusenstern

Wheat from the Yenisei was sold by Muslims and Uighurs during inadequate harvests to Bukhara and Soghd during the Tahirid era.

Russians first reached the upper Yenisei in 1605, travelling from the Ob, up the Ket, portaging and then down the Yenisei as far as the Sym.

In 1862 Paul Theodor von Krusenstern attempted to navigate with two ships from Murmansk through the Kara Sea to the delta of the river Yenissei, but unfortunately was shipwrecked before obtaining success.

During World War II, Nazi Germany and the Japanese Empire agreed to divide Asia along a line that followed the Yenisei to the border of China and then along the border of China and the Soviet Union.

== Pollution ==
Studies have shown that the Yenisei suffers from contamination caused by radioactive discharges from a factory that produced bomb-grade plutonium in the secret city of Krasnoyarsk-26, now known as Zheleznogorsk.

On 8 June 2025, a ship towing two barges ran aground and broke apart along a section of the river in Kazachinsky District, Krasnoyarsk Krai, spilling around 30 metric tons of diesel fuel and causing an oil spill reaching up to 50 kilometers along the shoreline.

== Gallery ==
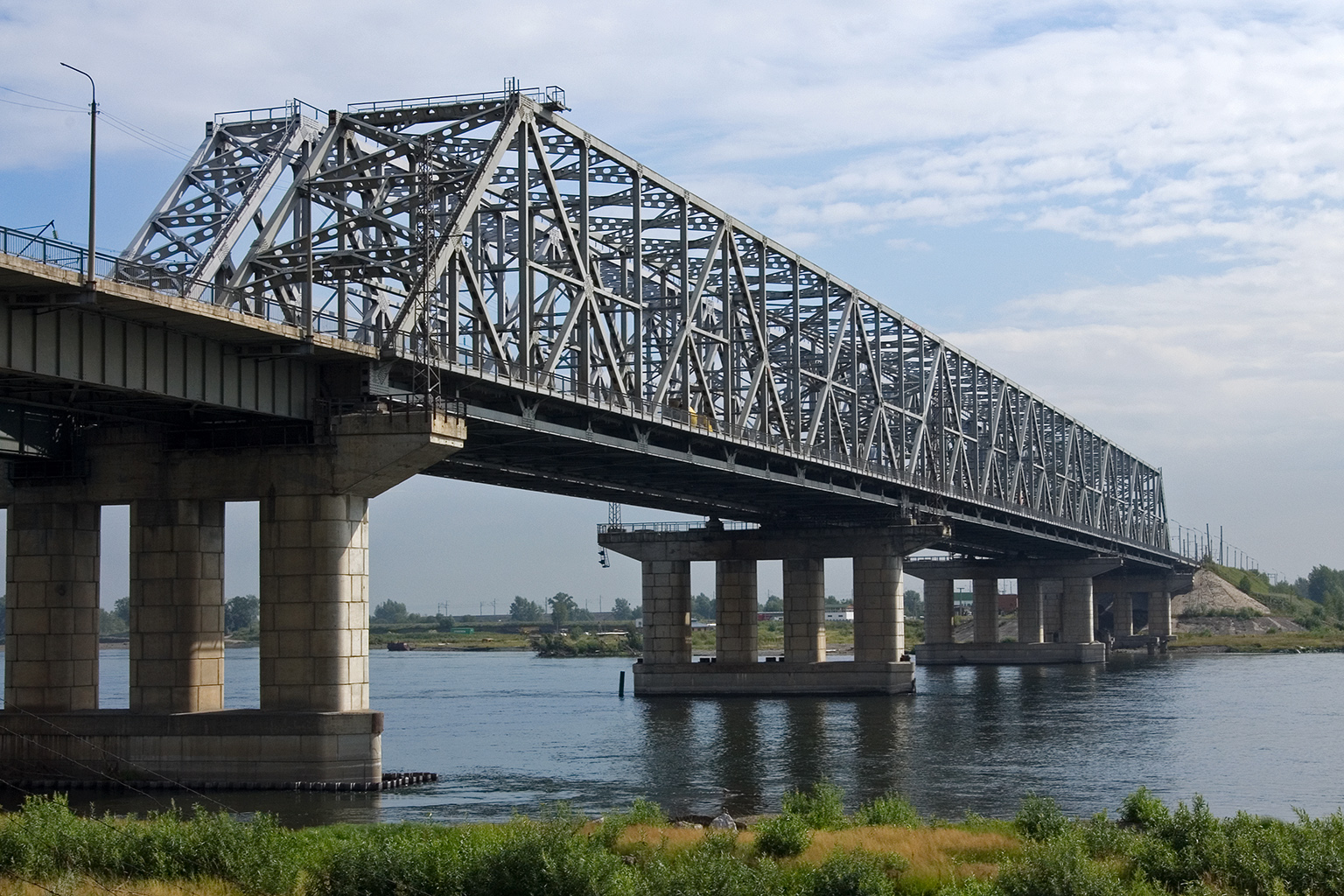
The bridge over the Yenisei in Krasnoyarsk, Russia, viewed from the left bank.

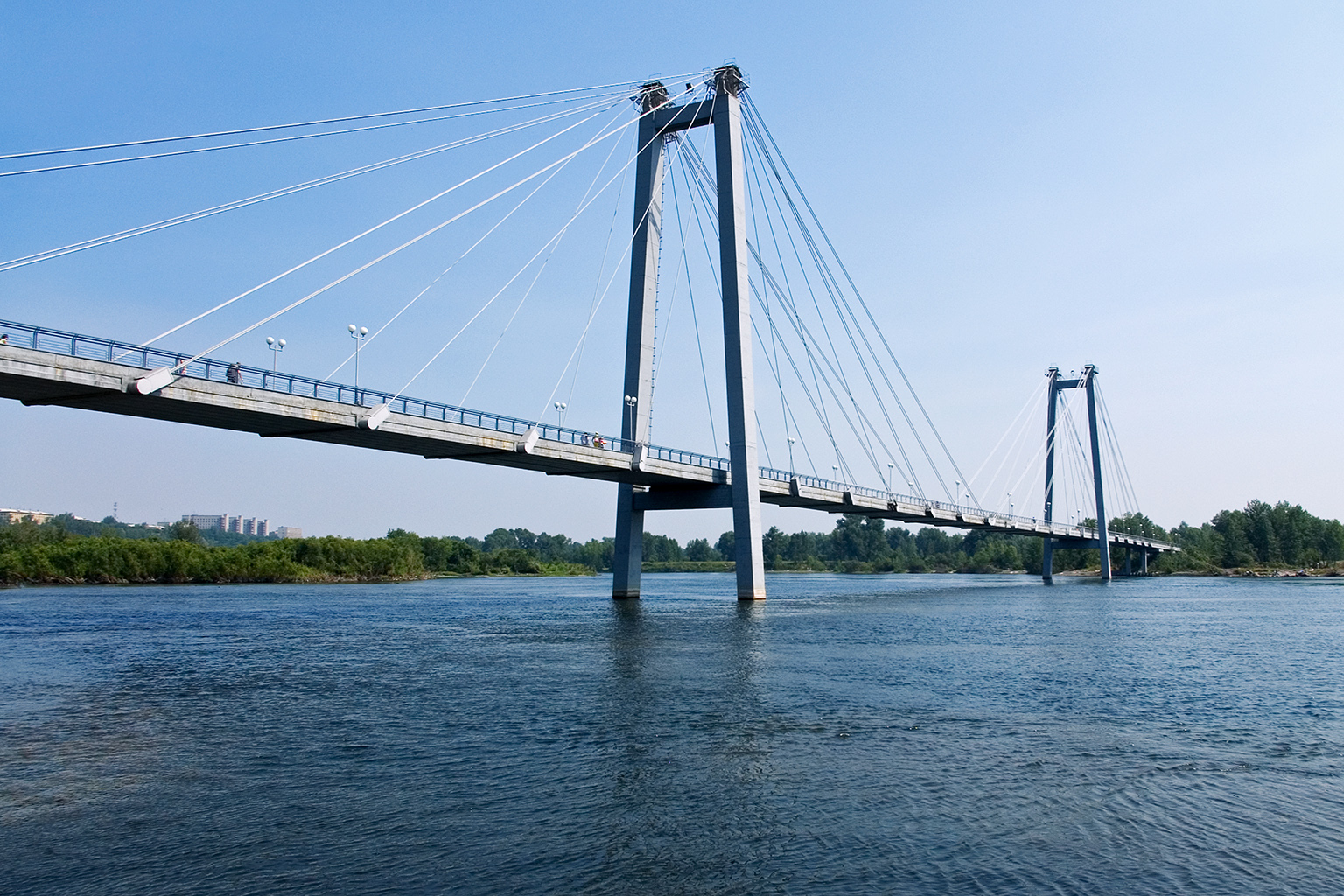
Vinogradovsky Most, the bridge in Krasnoyarsk, Russia, viewed from the left bank.

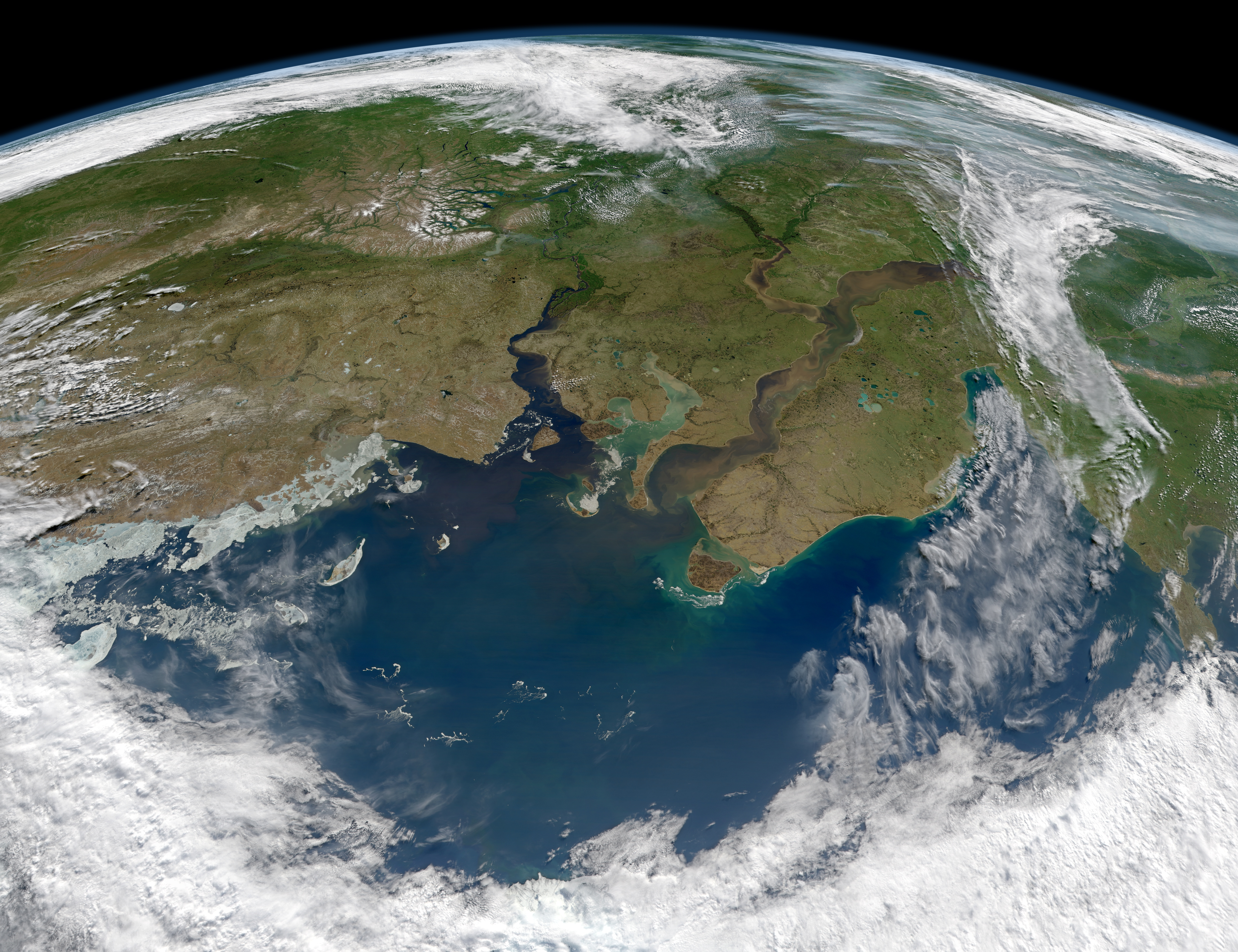
The Yenisei (left) and the Ob flow into Kara Sea (south at top in this view).

== See also ==
- List of rivers of Russia
- Sayano-Shushenskaya Dam
- Yenisey Range
