= Colin Angus (explorer) =

Canadian author and adventurer

Colin Angus is a Canadian author and adventurer who is the first person to make a self-propelled global circumnavigation. Due to varying definitions of the term "circumnavigation", debate has arisen as to whether or not the route travelled fulfilled the strictest criteria (for further discussion, see World Circumnavigation). As part of the circumnavigation, Angus and his then fiancé Julie Wafaei (now Julie Angus) made the first rowboat crossing of the Atlantic Ocean from mainland Europe to mainland North America, and Wafaei became the first Canadian woman to row across any ocean. Colin and Julie have two sons: Leif, born September 2010, and Oliver, born June 2014.

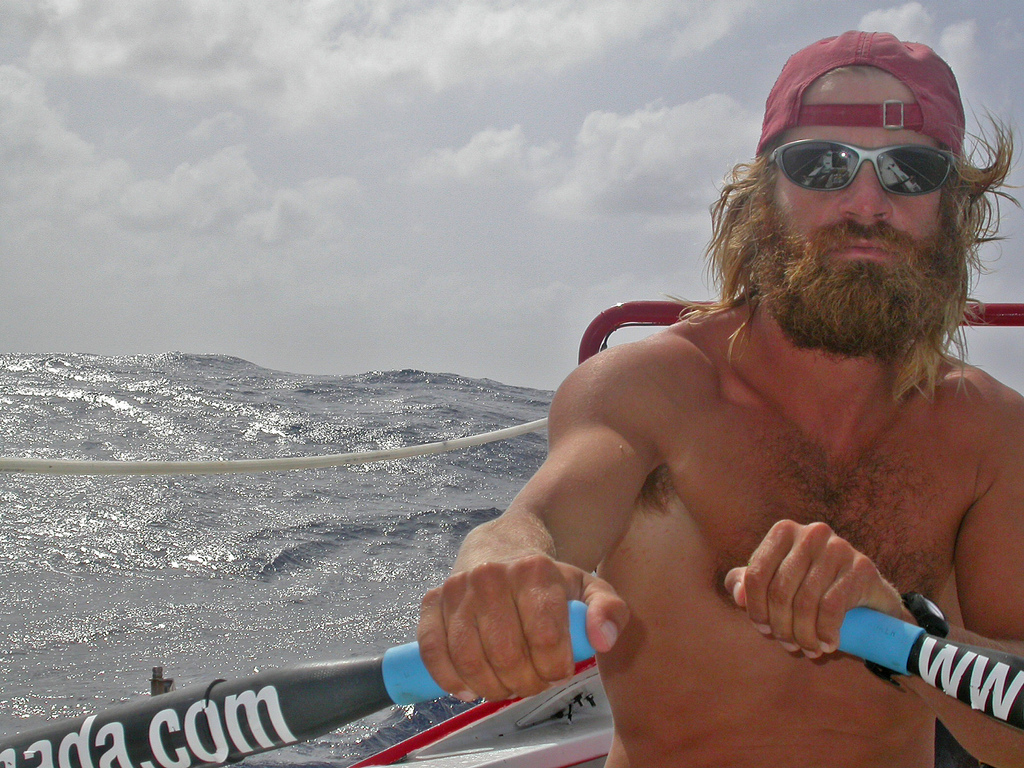
Colin rowing across the Atlantic Ocean

Other expeditions Angus has completed include the first descent of the Yenisei River (the world's fifth longest river); a complete descent of the Amazon River from source to sea; from Scotland to Syria by bicycle and rowboat; and sailing from Spain to the Middle East investigating the domestication of the olive tree.

Angus has written four books: Lost in Mongolia (2003), Amazon Extreme (2004), Beyond the Horizon (2007), and Rowed Trip (2009). He has co-produced two films for National Geographic Television. These include "Boiling Water and Bullets" covering the Amazon River, as well as a film on the Yenisey River in Mongolia. Outside Magazine included Colin Angus in a compilation of 25 people changing the world in its December 2005 issue.

Colin and Julie are active speakers , and were participants in Canada's ideacity .

Colin is a rowboat advocate and designer, and was recognized by Carl Cramer, Publisher for Wooden Boat Magazine, for a unique "camper" rowboat that allows for a sleeping berth yet has very low wind resistance .

In 2011 Colin rowed the 1,100 km (683 miles) around Vancouver Island in 15 days, 11 hours, and 47 minutes, setting a new record for the fastest human powered circumnavigation of the island.

Colin also writes a monthly column for the magazine Explore , addressing a wide range of subjects such as fund raising, camping, diets, exercise, and his philosophy of rowboats and long distance rowing. On this last point he advocates sliding seat rowing as an efficient way of propelling a boat, since it promotes a full body workout, uses all the major muscles, and is also conducive to two person, continuous travel.

Colin and Julie have also modeled clothing for Helly Hansen, and did a catalogue photoshoot with them in Chamonix, France.

== Adventures ==
=== Pacific Ocean ===
Colin Angus began his adventuring lifestyle at nineteen with a five-year sailing odyssey in the Pacific Ocean, half of it done with his best friend Dan Audet.

=== Amazon River ===
In 1999, along with Australian Ben Kozel and South African Scott Borthwick, he was among the first to raft the Amazon river from source to sea. The trio retraced the route of Polish kayaker Piotr Chmieliński's 1986 historic first-ever descent of the Amazon River from source to sea, which used a kayak.

=== Yenise River ===
To follow up the rafting of the Amazon, Angus put together a team which would accomplish the same task on the previously untraversed Yenisei River in Asia.

=== Around the World ===
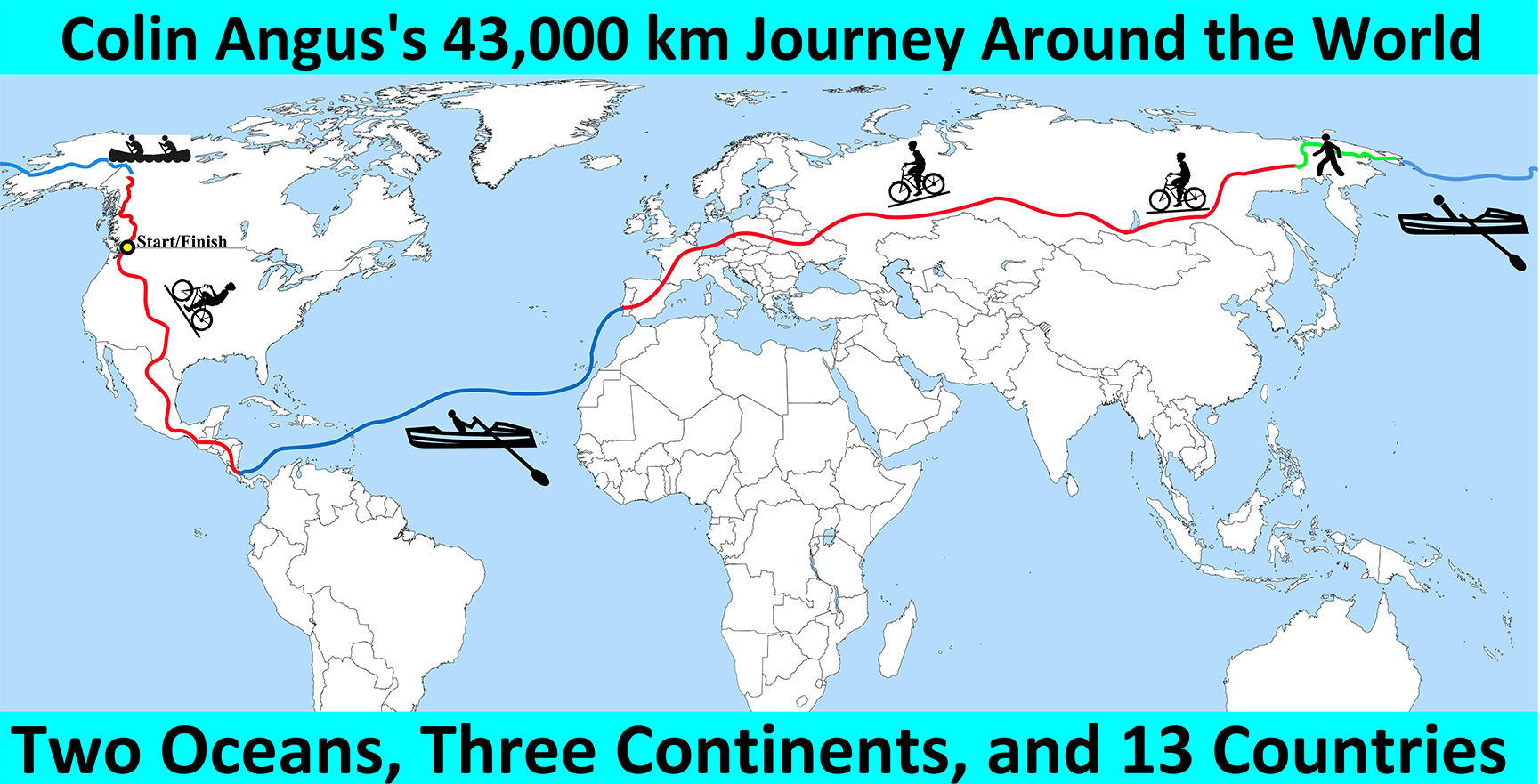
Colin Angus's trip around the world by bike, canoe, rowboat and foot

Angus traveled around the world using exclusively human power, walking and biking across land and rowing across water, completing his journey in May 2006. The expedition began with partner Tim Harvey. However, in Siberia the pair parted ways due to interpersonal conflict. Harvey continued and eventually circled the planet, but on a longer route than Angus, including Africa and South America . Angus was joined bicycling in Europe by his then fiancée Julie Wafaei, who purchased a rowboat for them to cross the Atlantic. The British adventurer Jason Lewis, claims that Angus's journey was not a circumnavigation, because it did not pass through two antipodal points on the globe, although this is not required by Guinness World Records.

The ship's log on the Russian research vessel Professor Khromov cite a high-seas rescue in support of the expedition. Angus had to fly to Canada for medical treatment during the expedition, but flew back to Russia to continue from the point he had left beforehand.

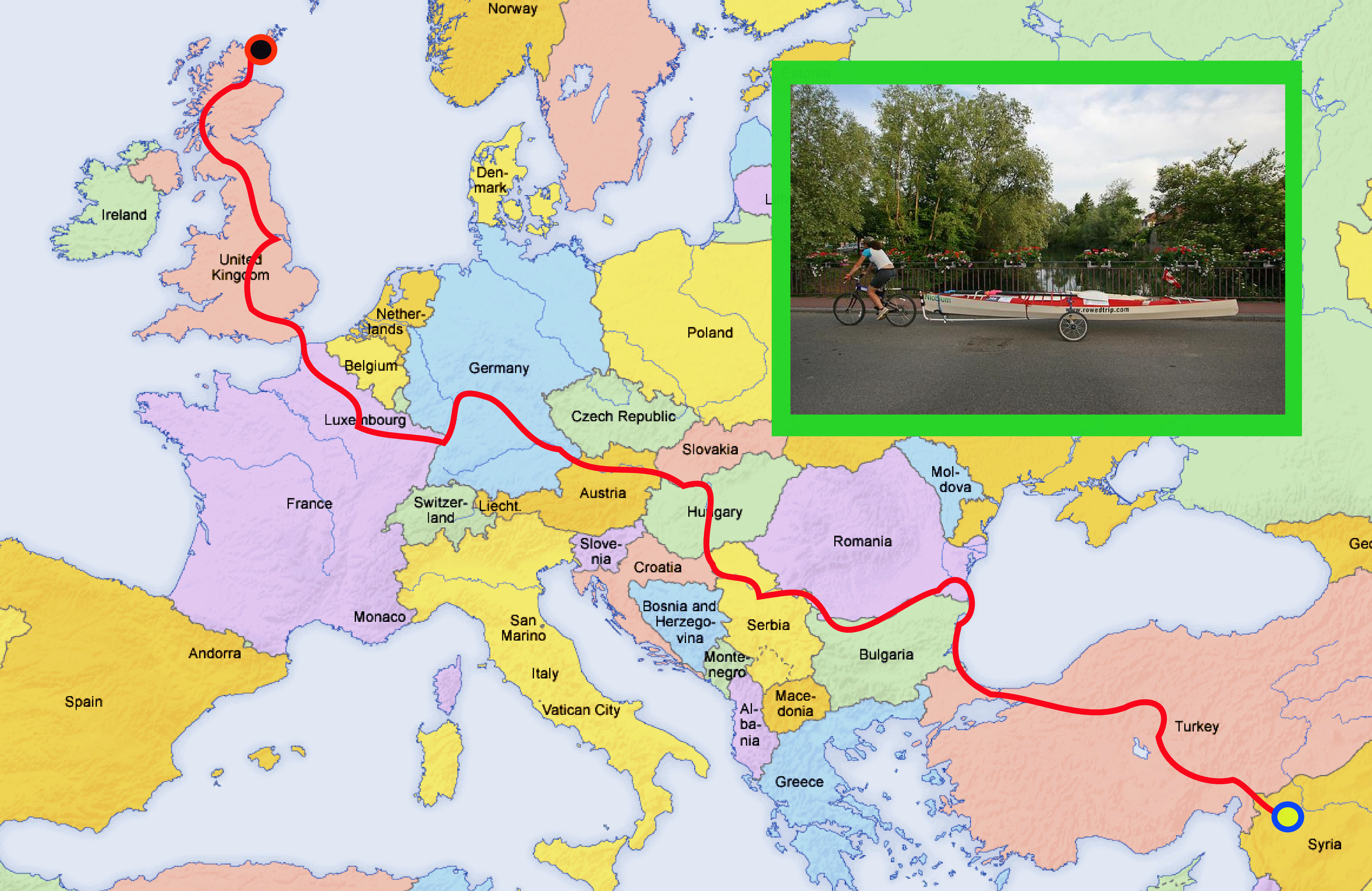
Julie and Colin's route from Scotland to Syria via rowboat and bicycle

=== Scotland to Syria ===
In 2008 Colin and his wife, Julie Angus, completed a trip from northernmost Scotland to Syria, covering 7,000 km (4,350 miles) of rivers and roads. Each used a separate rowboat on the water sections, and portaged using bicycle-trailer systems between waterways. This expedition was described in their book "Rowed Trip, From Scotland to Syria by Oar" published in 2009, as well as a film titled "Rowed Trip."

=== Vancouver Island Circumnavigation ===
In 2011 Colin rowed the 1,100 km (683 miles) around Vancouver Island in 15 days, 11 hours, and 47 minutes, setting a new record for the fastest human powered circumnavigation of the island. The previous record was held by Joe O'Blenis, set in 2010, who circumnavigated in 16 days, 12 hours and 14 minutes in a kayak . Colin's record was broken in June, 2014 by Kayaker Russell Henry in 12 days, 23 hours, and 45 minutes.

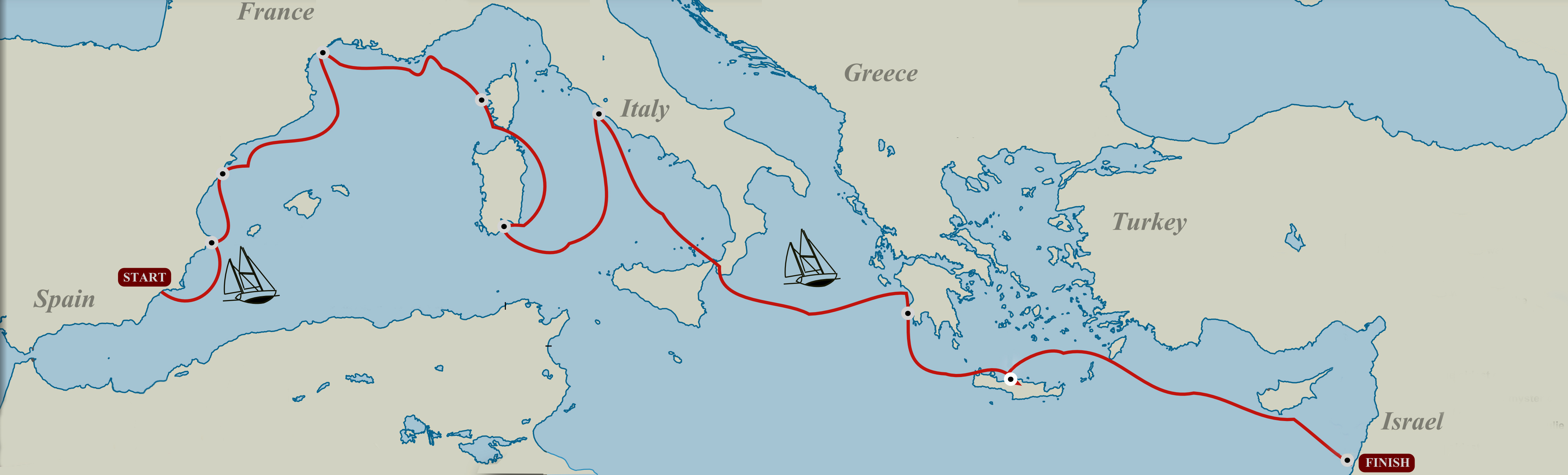
Colin and Julie's route from Spain to Syria

=== Olive Odyssey ===
Also in 2011, Colin, his wife Julie Angus, and their young son Leif sailed from Spain to the Middle-East, retracing the domestication of the olive tree. Their adventure is described in Julie's most recent book, "Olive Odyssey: Searching for the Secrets of the Fruit that Seduced the World".

=== Yukon River ===
In 2013 Colin and partner Steven Price attempted to set a human-powered only record for the fastest time down a 440-mile stretch of the Yukon River between the towns of Whitehorse and Dawson City, Yukon, Canada. The previous record was set in 2008 during the Yukon River Quest, with a total elapsed time of 49 hours 32 minutes set by a 6-person canoe. Colin and Steven took 50 hours 50 minutes in a rowboat with one rowing station, missing the record by 1 hour 18 minutes, making them the fourth fastest in history for total elapsed time, and the only recorded non-stop river trip between these two towns.

=== Race to Alaska ===
For the 2016 Race to Alaska (R2AK), a 750-mile all-water race from Port Townsend to Ketchikan, Alaska, Colin placed first in the solo category as well as first in boats under 20 feet in length. Colin sailed and rowed a ketch rigged rowboat. Colin's time for the 2016 R2AK was 13 days one hour and 59 minutes.

=== Open Ocean Robotics ===
With Julie Angus Colin has launched a new company called Open Ocean Robotics . The purpose of the company is to develop autonomous boats powered by wind and/or solar power capable of deep ocean travel. Julie won a $800,000 award from Natural Resources Canada and the MaRS Discovery District for the Woman in Cleantech Challenge to develop prototypes and demonstrate feasibility . After two and a half years, should she be successful, then the company may receive an additional $1,000,000

== Recognition ==
- Adventurer of the Year Award 2007 from National Geographic Adventure presented to Julie and Colin
- Four International Books including two National Bestsellers written by Julie and Colin
- Outside Magazine named Colin as one of the Top 25 "bold visionaries with world changing dreams" along with three full-page articles detailing his most recent expedition.
- Men's Journal honored Colin and eight others for being part of a new breed of explorers, as well as covering their adventures in other articles
- Three Documentary Films produced by Angus Adventures, collectively won 11 awards and aired on National Geographic television around the world
- Globe and Mail Newspaper (Canada's National Paper) published a 16-part series by Colin, as well as five articles written by their own reporters detailing their recent expedition.
- CBC Radio conducted 26 interviews from the field for the national program "As it Happens"
- Reader's Digest, the world's number-one selling magazine, published a 5000-word article written by Colin Angus.
- Recognized by Carl Cramer, Publisher for Wooden Boat Magazine, for a unique "camper" rowboat that allows for a sleeping berth yet has very low wind resistance
- In 2015 Colin was recognized by Men's Journal as one of the 50 most adventurous men .
- In 2017 Colin was recognized by Men's Journal as one of the 25 most adventurous men .

== Books ==
- Lost in Mongolia: Rafting the World's Last Unchallenged River. Anchor Canada: 2003. Paperback: ISBN 978-0-385-66014-3, ISBN 0-385-66014-6.
- Amazon Extreme: Three Ordinary Guys, One Rubber Raft, and the Most Dangerous River on Earth. Anchor Canada: 2004. Paperback: ISBN 978-0-385-66009-9, ISBN 0-385-66009-X.
- Beyond the Horizon: The Great Race to Finish the First Human-Powered Circumnavigation of the Planet. Doubleday Canada: 2007. Hardcover: ISBN 978-0-385-66123-2, ISBN 0-385-66123-1.
- "Rowed Trip: From Scotland to Syria by Oar". Doubleday Canada: 2009. Hardcover: ISBN 978-0-385-66633-6

== See also ==
- Adventure
- Extreme sport
