= Ben Kozel =

Ben Kozel (born 1973) is an adventurer, author, film maker and Science, Chemistry, Physics teacher in Camberwell High School, born in South Australia.

With friends Colin Angus and Scott Borthwick of South Africa, Kozel journeyed the length of the Amazon River in 1999–2000. In 2001, Kozel, Colin Angus, and Remy Quinter became the first team to travel the entire length of the Yenisey River.

== Publications ==
- Three Men in a Raft, 2002, ISBN 0-330-36460-X
- Five Months in a Leaky Boat, 2003, ISBN 0-330-42146-8

== Film career ==
Kozel's films are co-produced for National Geographic Television. They have collectively won ten awards including Best Adventure Film at Mountainfilm in Telluride.
