= Race to Alaska =

Annual 750-mile adventure race

The Race to Alaska (R2AK) is an annual 750-mile (1200-km) adventure race from Port Townsend, Washington up the Inside Passage to Ketchikan, Alaska. Any form of boat is allowed, so long as it has no motors. Support crews are not allowed. Nearly half the teams do not make it to Alaska. The record time is 4 days, set in 2016.

The race takes place in two stages. The "Proving Ground" is a 40-mile (64-km) race from Port Townsend to Victoria, British Columbia, and acts as a qualifier. The second stage continues on to Alaska. In 2018, SEVENTY48, a human-powered-only on-water race was introduced, with racers sprinting from Tacoma, Washington to Port Townsend.

R2AK is a project of The Northwest Maritime Center.

== History ==
The first race was in 2015.

In 2016, 44 teams were accepted and 26 finished.

In 2017, the race introduced the "Boat Buyback Prize", through which the race organizers would offer each boat that finished $10,000 to buy their boat, regardless of the boat's value.

In 2018, the race introduced the Seventy48 race, a pre-race from Tacoma to Port Townsend. It is a 70-statute-mile human-powered only race in which the winner of the race receives as a prize all of the entry fees paid by participants.

With the 2020 race scrapped on account of the COVID-19 pandemic, the 6th edition of the race was deferred to 2021. When the 2021 race was also cancelled due to the Canadian border closure, R2AK High Command introduced WA360, a race using the structure of Race to Alaska, but contained within the waters of Washington State.

R2AK 2022, the first race after a 2 year hiatus, was won by Team Pure & Wild.

R2AK 2023 (main race) began on June 8 with 29 teams at the start line and was won by Team We Brake for Whales

== Race winners ==
Year	Winning team	Boat Make	Crew	Time
2015	Elsie Piddock	26.9’ (8.2m) Tri - Corsair F-25C	3	5d 1h 55m
2016	MAD Dog Racing	31.8’ (9.7m) Cat - Marstrom M32	3	3d 20h 13m*
2017	Pure & Wild / Freeburd	28’ (8.5m) Tri - Cust. Tetzlaff / Melvin 8.5m Class	3	4d 3h 5m
2018	First Federal’s Sail Like A Girl	31.8’ (9.7m) Mono - Melges 32	7	6d 13h 17m
2019	Angry Beaver - Skiff Sailing Foundation	40.0’ (12.2m) Mono - Shock 40	6	4d 3h 56m
2020	Race Cancelled			
2021	Race Cancelled			
2022	Pure & Wild	44.0’ (13.4m) Mono - Riptide 44	3	4d 4h 32m
2023	We Brake for Whales	40' (12.2m) Mono - Cust. Lyman Morse 40	8	5d 18h 59m
2024	Malolo	34.7' (10.6m) Tri - Cust. Cochrane Design	4	5d 3h 36m
2026	Northbound Nutters	32' (9.75m) Tri - Farrier F-32SR	4	5d 8h 4m

* Current Record

== Race location and route ==
The race begins in Port Townsend and proceeds to Victoria, which the racers are required to complete in 36 hours. Several days are spent in Victoria to give the racers the opportunity to correct any problems found or made during the first leg, and from there the race continues on to Ketchikan. The racers are required to pass through a checkpoint at Bella Bella, but are free to choose their course besides this. A checkpoint at Seymour Narrows, present since the first R2AK, has been removed by race organizers for the 2022 race, allowing racers to choose an offshore route for the first time.

== Eccentricities ==
The Race to Alaska is noted for having many eccentricities in its organization and prizes. Many were created to help advertise the race, such as the $10,000 first-place prize, and steak knife set second-place prize. The race also features a Le Mans Start in the Victoria start; this is a starting method where racers are gathered outside of the race area and must run to their vessels to begin the race. Race updates and team write-ups are styled to be humorous rather than professional, and often make reference to the racers themselves as being overly devoted or unintelligent for being willing to participate.

Sidebets have also been introduced, wherein sponsors offer a prize to whichever boat first completes the sponsor's criteria. An example of this is the Small Craft Advisor Magazine's offer of $1,000 and a place on the front cover to the first boat under 20' in length to complete the race.
