= Olenyok =

Olenyok or Olenek may refer to:

- Olenyok (river), a river in Russia
- Olenyok (rural locality), a rural locality (a selo) in the Sakha Republic, Russia
- Olenyok Airport, an airport in the same rural locality
- Olenyok Gulf, a gulf in the Laptev Sea

== See also ==
- Olenyoksky District
