= Kharyyalakh, Olenyoksky District, Sakha Republic =

Kharyyalakh Харыялах Харыйалаах (Sakha)
- Selo
- Interactive map of Kharyyalakh
- Location of Kharyyalakh Kharyyalakh (Sakha Republic)
- Coordinates: 68°30′N 112°25′E
- Country: Russia
- Federal subject: Sakha Republic
- Administrative district: Olenyoksky District
- Rural okrugSelsoviet: Kirbeysky Rural Okrug

Population (2010 Census)
  - Total: 846
  - Estimate (2021): 843 (−0.4%)

Administrative status
  - Capital of: Kirbeysky Rural Okrug

Municipal status
  - Municipal district: Olenyoksky Municipal District
  - Rural settlement: Kirbeysky Rural Settlement
  - Capital of: Kirbeysky Rural Settlement
- Time zone: UTC+
- Postal code: 678343
- OKTMO ID: 98642424101

Kharyyalakh (Russian: Харыялах; Yakut: Харыйалаах, Xarıyalaax) is a rural locality (a selo), the only inhabited locality, and the administrative center of Kirbeysky Rural Okrug of Olenyoksky District in the Sakha Republic, Russia, located 3 kilometers (1.9 mi) from Olenyok, the administrative center of the district. Its population as of the 2010 Census was 846, up from 832 recorded during the 2002 Census.

== Geography ==
The village is located at an elevation of 137 m (449 ft) above sea level on the right bank of the Olenyok river, downstream from the confluence with the Arga-Sala.
