= Kyuyonelikeen =

River in Yakutia (Sakha Republic), Russia

Kyuyonelikeen Кюёнэликээн / Күөнэликээн
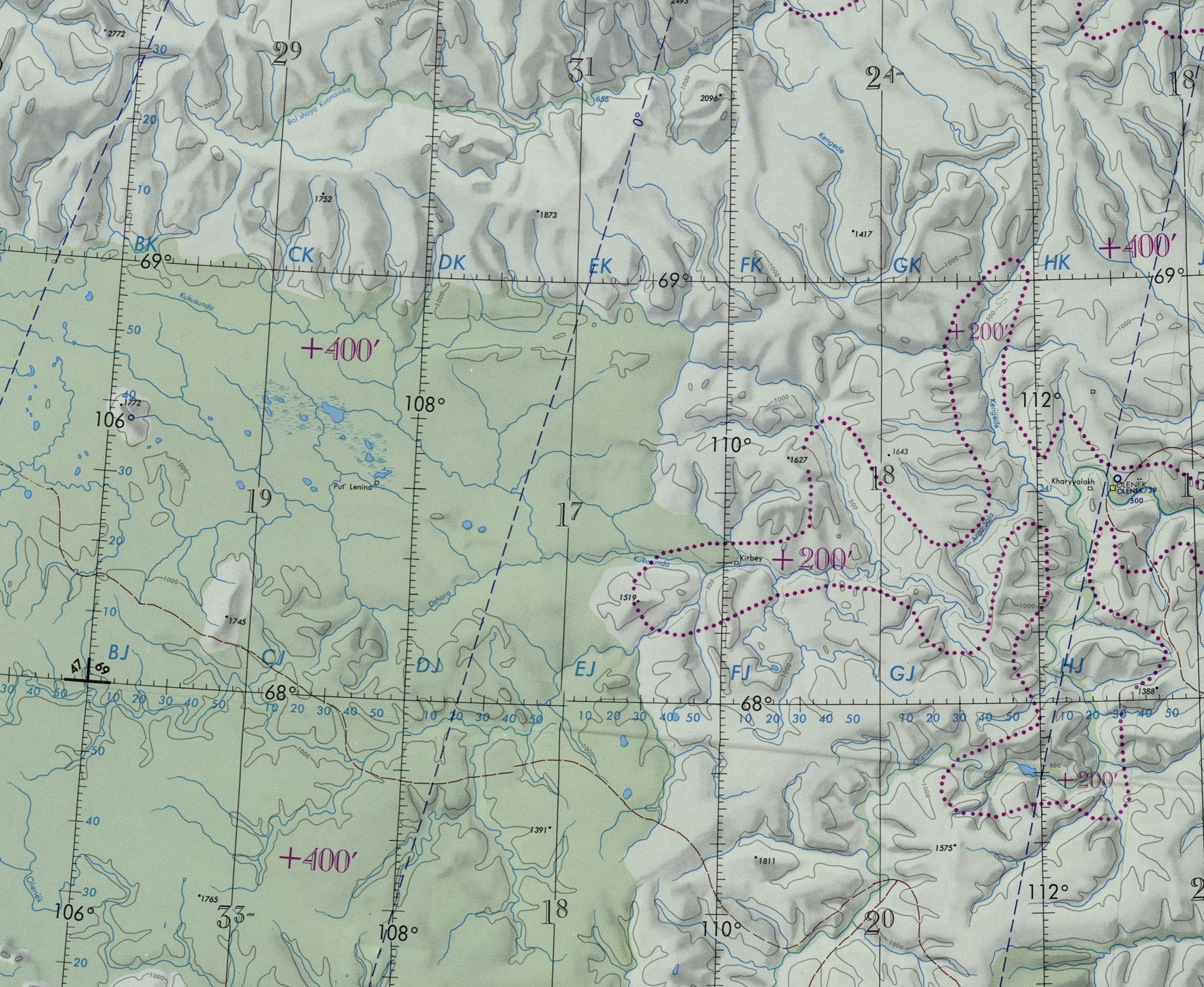
- Arga-Sala basin ONC map section with the Kyuyonelikeen in the lower section

- Mouth location in Yakutia, Russia Kyuyonelikeen (Russia)

Location
- Country: Russia

Physical characteristics
- Source
  - location: Central Siberian Plateau
  - coordinates: 67°27′22″N 109°02′53″E
- Mouth: Arga-Sala
  - coordinates: 67°55′44″N 108°31′06″E
- Length: 94 km (58 mi)
- Basin size: 3,190 km^{2} (1,230 sq mi)

Basin features
- Progression: Arga-Sala→Olenyok→Laptev Sea

The Kyuyonelikeen (Russian: Кюёнэликээн; Yakut: Күөнэликээн, Küönelikeen), also spelled as Kyuenelikyan, is a river in Yakutia (Sakha Republic) and Krasnoyarsk Krai, Russia. It is the fourth longest tributary of the Arga-Sala, of the Olenyok basin, and has a length of 94 kilometres (58 mi) and a drainage basin area of 3,190 square kilometres (1,230 mi^{2}).

The river and its tributaries flow across uninhabited areas. The nearest settlement is Olenyok village, Olenyoksky District, located to the east of its mouth.

== Course ==
The Kyuyonelikeen is the largest right tributary of the Arga-Sala. Its sources are in the Central Siberian Plateau. The river flows roughly westwards in its uppermost section, then it bends and flows northwards or northwestwards all along its course. 22 km (14 mi) before its mouth it is joined by the Alyylaakh, a tributary flowing from the west which is almost as long as the Kyuyonelikeen itself. Finally it joins the right bank of the Arga-Sala river downstream of the mouth of the Kukusunda, 276 km (171 mi) from its mouth in the Olenyok.

=== Tributaries ===
Its main tributaries are the 87 km (54 mi) long Alyylaakh (Алыылаах) and the 35 km (22 mi) long Khapchaannaakh (Хапчааннаах) from the left, as well as the 32 km (20 mi) long Chuostaakh (Чуостаах) from the right.

== See also ==
- List of rivers of Russia
