= Kyuyonelekeen =

River in Yakutia (Sakha Republic), Russia

Kyuyonelekeen Кюёнэлэкээн / Күөнэлэкээн
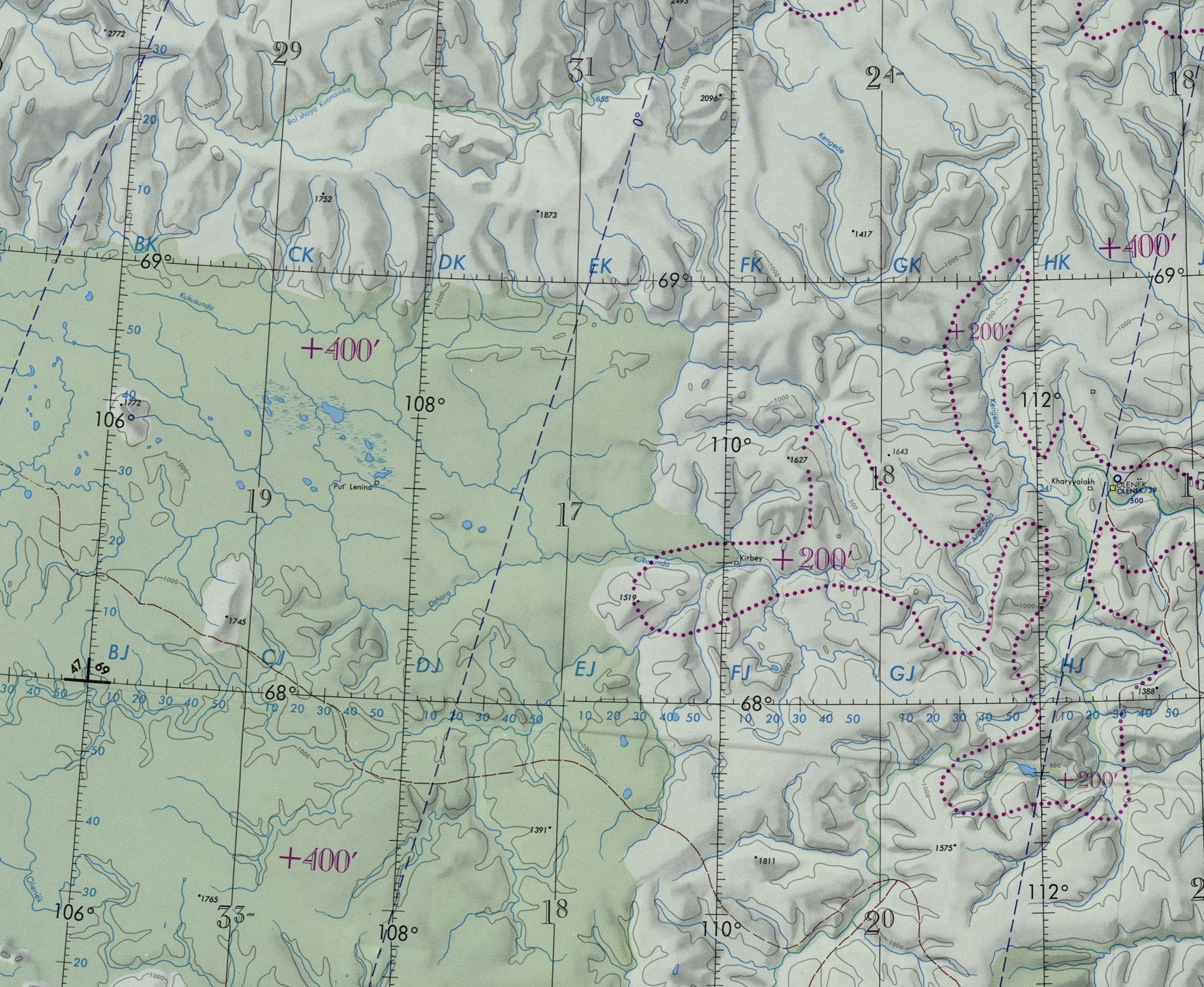
- Arga-Sala basin ONC map section with the Kyuyonelekeen in the central part

- Mouth location in Yakutia, Russia Kyuyonelekeen (Russia)

Location
- Country: Russia

Physical characteristics
- Source
  - location: Central Siberian Plateau
- Mouth: Arga-Sala
  - coordinates: 68°19′41″N 110°57′06″E
- Length: 205 km (127 mi)
- Basin size: 6,030 km^{2} (2,330 sq mi)

Basin features
- Progression: Arga-Sala→Olenyok→Laptev Sea

The Kyuyonelekeen (Russian: Кюёнэлэкээн; Yakut: Күөнэлэкээн, Küönelekeen), also spelled as Kyuyonelekyan and Kyuenelekyan, is a river in Yakutia (Sakha Republic) and Krasnoyarsk Krai, Russia. It is the third longest tributary of the Arga-Sala, of the Olenyok basin, and has a length of 205 kilometres (127 mi) and a drainage basin area of 6,030 square kilometres (2,330 mi^{2}).

The river and its tributaries flow across uninhabited areas. The nearest settlement is Olenyok village, Olenyoksky District, located to the east of its mouth.

== Course ==
The Kyuyonelekeen is a left tributary of the Arga-Sala. Its sources are in the southern end of the Anabar Plateau, Central Siberian Plateau, south of the basin of the Bolshaya Kuonamka, part of the Anabar basin. The river flows roughly southwards across mountainous taiga, to the west of the Kengeede. In mid course it turns eastwards and, after a stretch, southeastwards. Finally it joins the left bank of the Arga-Sala river 118 km (73 mi) from its mouth in the Olenyok.

The river is frozen between the first half of October and late May or early June.

=== Tributaries ===
Its main tributaries are the 89 km (55 mi) long Usumuun (Усумуун), the 63 km (39 mi) long Monkhoolo (Монхооло) and the 44 km (27 mi) long Ebeseleekh (Эбэсэлээх) from the left, as well as the 52 km (32 mi) long Iseek (Исээк) and the 48 km (30 mi) long Ulakhan-Byorchyok (Улахан-Бёрчёк) from the right.

== See also ==
- List of rivers of Russia
