= Anabar =

Anabar may refer to:

- Anabar Bay, Laptev Sea
- Anabar constituency, Nauru
- Anabar district, Nauru
- Anabar District, Russia, Sakha, Russia
- Anabar Highway, Russia
- Anabar Plateau, Russia
- Anabar (river), Sakha, Russia
- Anabar Shield, Russia
