= Udya =

River in Yakutia (Sakha Republic), Russia

Udya (Udzha) Удя (Уджа) / Удьаа
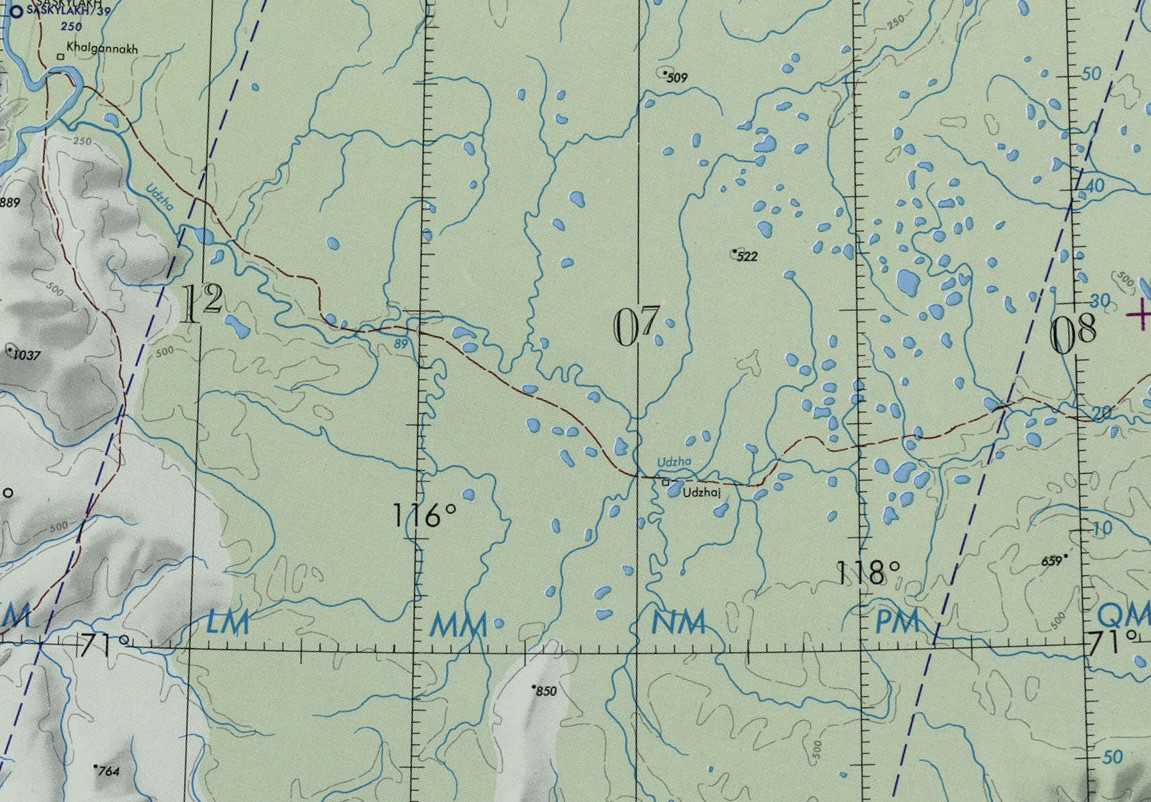
- Course of the Udzha ONC map section

- Mouth location in Yakutia, Russia Udya (Russia)

Location
- Country: Russian Federation
- Federal subject: Yakutia
- District: Anabarsky District / Olenyoksky District

Physical characteristics
- Source
  - location: North Siberian Lowland / Central Siberian Plateau
  - coordinates: 70°44′02″N 117°40′35″E
  - elevation: 112 m (367 ft)
- Mouth: Anabar
  - coordinates: 71°46′04″N 114°18′13″E
  - elevation: 6 m (20 ft)
- Length: 342 km (213 mi)
- Basin size: 15,700 km^{2} (6,100 sq mi)

Basin features
- Progression: Anabar→Laptev Sea

The Udya or Udzha (Russian: Удя or Уджа; Yakut: Удьаа, Ucaa) is a river in Yakutia (Sakha Republic), Russia. It is a right tributary of the Anabar with a length of 342 kilometres (213 mi). Its drainage basin area is 15,700 square kilometres (6,100 mi^{2}).

The river flows north of the Arctic Circle, in the northern limits of the Central Siberian Plateau and the North Siberian Lowland. The area is lonely and desolate, devoid of settlements. The Beyenchime-Udzha interfluve is an area where diamonds are found.

== Course ==
The Udya is the third largest tributary of the Anabar. Its sources are in the vicinity of the sources of the Bur, Buolkalakh and the Beyenchime of the Olenyok basin. It is formed at the confluence of rivers Tokur-Udya and Mas-Udya in an area of lakes. It heads roughly northwestwards all along its course. Finally it joins the right bank of the Anabar 242 km (150 mi) from its mouth. The confluence is not far upstream from Saskylakh.

The river is fed by rain and snow. It is frozen between early October and late May / early June. The longest tributaries are the 129 kilometres (80 mi) long Chyuyompe-Yurege (Чюёмпэ-Юрэгэ) and the 104 kilometres (65 mi) long Udyakan (Удьакан) from the right, as well as the 168 kilometres (104 mi) long Chymaara (Чымаара) from the left.

== Fauna ==
The Udya river is rich in fish species, including broad whitefish, humpback whitefish and peled, among others.

== See also ==
- List of rivers of Russia
