= Birekte terrane =

Terrane by the Anabar Shield

The Birekte terrane is a terrane located by the Anabar Shield, in the north-eastern part of the Siberian Craton, in the basins of the Popigay, Anabar, Birekte and Olenyok rivers. It is defined entirely from geophysical data and is overlain by Riphean-Paleozoic platformal cover.
