= Buolkalakh =

River in Yakutia (Sakha Republic), Russia

Buolkalakh Буолкалах / Буолкалаах
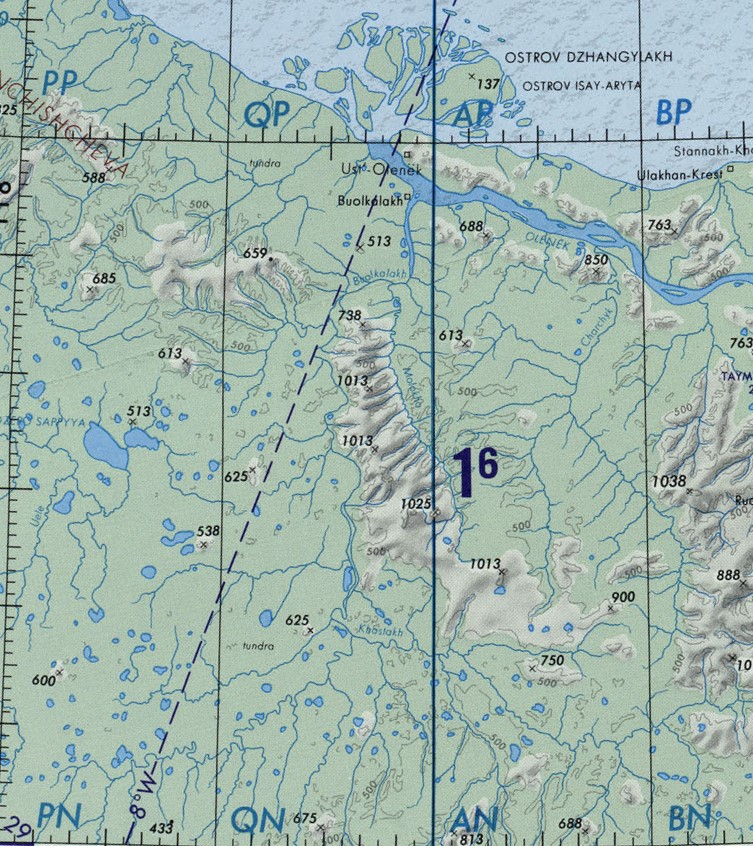
- Course of the Buolkalakh

- Mouth location in Yakutia, Russia Buolkalakh (Russia)

Location
- Country: Russia

Physical characteristics
- Source
  - location: North Siberian Lowland
  - coordinates: 71°35′00″N 117°41′45″E
- Mouth: Olenyok
  - coordinates: 72°55′32″N 119°55′18″E
- Length: 305 km (190 mi)
- Basin size: 8,780 km^{2} (3,390 sq mi)

Basin features
- Progression: Olenyok→Laptev Sea

The Buolkalakh (Russian: Буолкалах; Yakut: Буолкалах, Buolkalax) is a river in Yakutia (Sakha Republic), Russia. It is a tributary of the Olenyok with a length of 305 kilometres (190 mi) and a drainage basin area of 8,780 square kilometres (3,390 mi^{2}).

It is a lowland river with its mouth very close to the Olenyok delta. It flows north of the Arctic Circle across a lonely, desolate tundra area devoid of settlements.

== Course ==
The Buolkalakh is a left tributary of the Olenyok. It has its origin in a swampy area full of lakes, just a little north of the sources of the Udya and the Bur. It flows roughly northwestwards, meandering along its course. After the confluence of the Khaastaakh it flows roughly northwards, skirting a low ridge. Finally it joins the left bank of the Olenyok river only 6.9 km (4.3 mi) upstream of its mouth. The confluence is a little upstream from the village of Ust-Olenyok.

The river is fed by snow and rain. It is frozen between early October and early June. The longest tributaries are the 123 kilometres (76 mi) long Khaastaakh (Хаастаах) and the 74 kilometres (46 mi) long Molokho (Молохо) from the right. The river basin is mostly in Olenyoksky District, with the upper course section of the Khaastaakh in Bulunsky District.

== See also ==
- List of rivers of Russia
