= Zhilinda =

Zhilinda Жилинда Дьилиндэ (Sakha)
- Selo
- Interactive map of Zhilinda
- Location of Zhilinda Zhilinda (Sakha Republic)
- Coordinates: 70°08′N 113°59′E
- Country: Russia
- Federal subject: Sakha Republic
- Administrative district: Olenyoksky District
- Rural okrugSelsoviet: Zhilindinsky Rural Okrug
- Founded: 1934

Population (2010 Census)
  - Total: 664
  - Estimate (2021): 709 (+6.8%)

Administrative status
  - Capital of: Zhilindinsky Rural Okrug

Municipal status
  - Municipal district: Olenyoksky Municipal District
  - Rural settlement: Zhilindinsky Rural Settlement
  - Capital of: Zhilindinsky Rural Settlement
- Time zone: UTC+
- Postal code: 678492
- OKTMO ID: 98642411101

Zhilinda (Russian: Жилинда; Yakut: Дьилиндэ, Cilinde) is a rural locality (a selo), the only inhabited locality, and the administrative center of Zhilindinsky Rural Okrug of Olenyoksky District in the Sakha Republic, Russia, located 320 kilometers (200 mi) from Olenyok, the administrative center of the district. Its population as of the 2010 Census was 664, down from 685 recorded during the 2002 Census.

== Climate ==
With an intensely continental subarctic climate (Köppen climate classification Dfc, bordering Dfd), Zhilinda has severely cold winters and mild summers. Average monthly temperatures in Zhilinda range from +14.3 °C (57.7 °F) in July to −36.4 °C (−33.5 °F) in January.

The climate is quite dry, with most of the annual precipitation occurring in the summer months, due to the intense Siberian High forming around the very cold continental air during the winter. However, summer precipitation is not heavy since the moist southeasterly winds from the Pacific Ocean lose their moisture over the coastal mountains well before reaching Zhilinda.

Zhilinda dipped to −62.1 °C (−79.8 °F) on Jan 10 2023, its lowest January temperature on record. It marked the lowest temperature in Siberia since 2002.

Climate data for Zhilinda (1991–2020 normals, extremes 1942–present)
| Month | Jan | Feb | Mar | Apr | May | Jun | Jul | Aug | Sep | Oct | Nov | Dec | Year |
|---|---|---|---|---|---|---|---|---|---|---|---|---|---|
| Record high °C (°F) | −0.4 (31.3) | −2.8 (27.0) | 4.9 (40.8) | 14.8 (58.6) | 27.9 (82.2) | 34.2 (93.6) | 34.4 (93.9) | 32.2 (90.0) | 25.4 (77.7) | 10.9 (51.6) | 5.4 (41.7) | 0.0 (32.0) | 34.4 (93.9) |
| Mean daily maximum °C (°F) | −32.2 (−26.0) | −30.4 (−22.7) | −17.6 (0.3) | −5.3 (22.5) | 3.4 (38.1) | 15.9 (60.6) | 19.6 (67.3) | 15.6 (60.1) | 6.1 (43.0) | −7.9 (17.8) | −24.3 (−11.7) | −30.6 (−23.1) | −7.3 (18.9) |
| Daily mean °C (°F) | −36.4 (−33.5) | −35.1 (−31.2) | −24.8 (−12.6) | −12.1 (10.2) | −1.4 (29.5) | 10.7 (51.3) | 14.3 (57.7) | 10.4 (50.7) | 2.1 (35.8) | −11.5 (11.3) | −28.3 (−18.9) | −34.5 (−30.1) | −12.2 (10.0) |
| Mean daily minimum °C (°F) | −40.4 (−40.7) | −39.3 (−38.7) | −31.5 (−24.7) | −19.1 (−2.4) | −6.2 (20.8) | 6.2 (43.2) | 9.4 (48.9) | 5.4 (41.7) | −1.4 (29.5) | −15.3 (4.5) | −32.2 (−26.0) | −38.4 (−37.1) | −16.9 (1.6) |
| Record low °C (°F) | −62.1 (−79.8) | −63.5 (−82.3) | −57.5 (−71.5) | −46.0 (−50.8) | −32.7 (−26.9) | −12.9 (8.8) | −3.3 (26.1) | −8.8 (16.2) | −25.0 (−13.0) | −47.7 (−53.9) | −57.1 (−70.8) | −63.0 (−81.4) | −63.5 (−82.3) |
| Average precipitation mm (inches) | 8 (0.3) | 7 (0.3) | 10 (0.4) | 12 (0.5) | 22 (0.9) | 36 (1.4) | 50 (2.0) | 46 (1.8) | 26 (1.0) | 22 (0.9) | 15 (0.6) | 9 (0.4) | 263 (10.5) |
Source: Погода и Климат
