= Kengeede =

River in Yakutia (Sakha Republic), Russia

Kengeede Кэнгээдэ / Күҥгэдэ
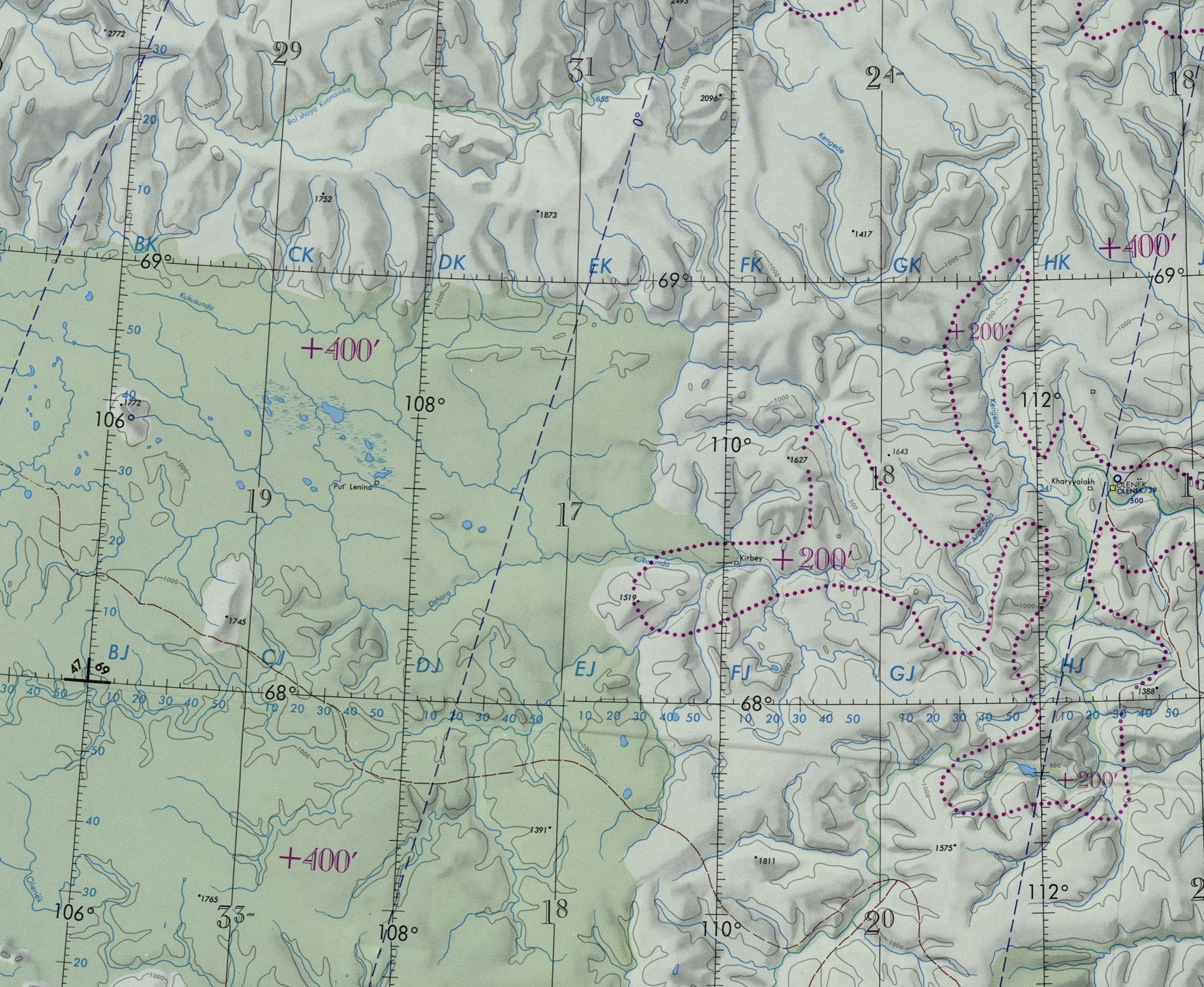
- Arga-Sala basin ONC map section with the Kengeede in the upper right

- Mouth location in Yakutia, Russia Kengeede (Russia)

Location
- Country: Russia

Physical characteristics
- Source
  - location: Central Siberian Plateau
- Mouth: Arga-Sala
  - coordinates: 68°31′08″N 111°55′47″E
  - elevation: 108 m (354 ft)
- Length: 241 km (150 mi)
- Basin size: 7,610 km^{2} (2,940 sq mi)

Basin features
- Progression: Arga-Sala→Olenyok→Laptev Sea

The Kengeede (Russian: Кэнгээдэ; Yakut: Күҥгэдэ, Küŋgede), also spelled as Kengede, Kengyade or Kende, is a river in Yakutia (Sakha Republic) and Krasnoyarsk Krai, Russia. It is the second longest tributary of the Arga-Sala, of the Olenyok basin, and has a length of 241 kilometres (150 mi) and a drainage basin area of 7,610 square kilometres (2,940 mi^{2}).

The river basin is a lonely, desolate area devoid of settlements.

== Course ==
The Kengeede is a left tributary of the Arga-Sala. Its sources are in the southern end of the Anabar Plateau, south of the basin of the Bolshaya Kuonamka. The river flows roughly southwards, to the east of the Kyuyonelekeen. It heads across mountainous taiga areas with rapids and riffles in numerous sections. In its upper course it bends eastwards, then for a stretch northeastwards, and then again southwards, heading in that direction for the remainder of its course. Finally it joins the left bank of the Arga-Sala river 12 km (7.5 mi) from its mouth, not far upstream of Olenyok village, Olenyoksky District, one of the few inhabited localities of the area.

The river is frozen between the first half of October and late May or early June.

=== Tributaries ===
Its main tributaries are the 44 km (27 mi) long Talakhtaakh (Талахтаах), the 109 km (68 mi) long Osur (Осур), the 85 km (53 mi) long Tokur (Токур) and the 58 km (36 mi) long Budurkhai (Будьурхай) from the left, as well as the 63 km (39 mi) long Kuraanakh (Кураанах) and the 54 km (34 mi) long Kharaap (Хараап) from the right.

== See also ==
- List of rivers of Russia
