= ONK (disambiguation) =

Oshi no Ko is a Japanese manga.

ONK may also refer to:

- Olenyok Airport, the IATA code ONK
- Oshi no Ko (2023 TV series), the anime adaptation of the manga
- onk, the ISO 639-3 code for Kabore, a variant of One language
