= Siligir =

River in Yakutia (Sakha Republic), Russia

Siligir Силигир
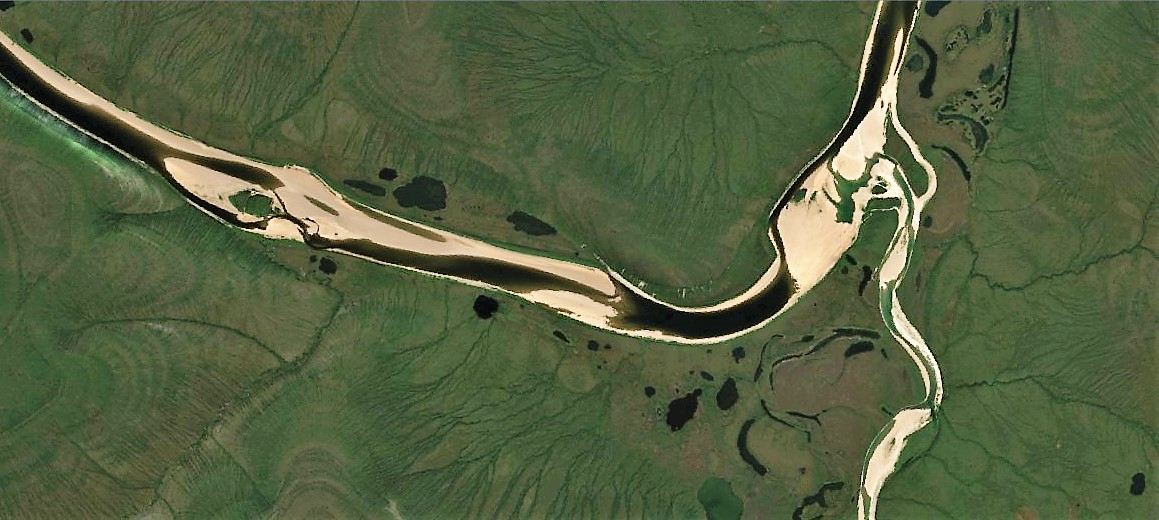
- Sentinel-2 picture of the confluence of the Olenyok with the Siligir.

- Mouth location in Yakutia, Russia Siligir (Russia)

Location
- Country: Russia

Physical characteristics
- Source
  - location: Central Siberian Plateau
  - coordinates: 67°06′44″N 113°05′44″E
  - elevation: 218 m (715 ft)
- Mouth: Olenyok
  - coordinates: 68°21′20″N 114°56′16″E
  - elevation: 87 m (285 ft)
- Length: 220 km (140 mi) (344 km (214 mi))
- Basin size: 13,400 km^{2} (5,200 sq mi)
- Discharge
  - average: 70 m^{3}/s (2,500 cu ft/s)

Basin features
- Progression: Olenyok→Laptev Sea

The Siligir (Russian: Силигир; Yakut: Силигир) is a river in Yakutia (Sakha Republic), Russia. It is the largest right tributary of the Olenyok with a length of 220 kilometres (140 mi) —344 kilometres (214 mi) long counting the Orto-Siligir stretch of its upper course. Its drainage basin area is 13,400 square kilometres (5,200 mi^{2}).

The river flows just north of the Arctic Circle across a lonely, desolate area of Olenyoksky District devoid of settlements. There are very large bitumen deposits along the Siligir basin.

== Course ==
The Siligir is formed in the Central Siberian Plateau at the confluence of the 124 km (77 mi) long Orto-Siligir (Орто-Силигир) and the 100 km (62 mi) long Usuk-Siligir (Усук-Силигир). The river flows initially northwards, bending to the NNE after a stretch, and then to the northeast. Finally it bends again to the north and meets the right bank of the Olenyok 1,351 km (839 mi) from its mouth. The confluence is downstream of Olenyok village, one of the few inhabited localities of the area. The river is frozen between early October and the second half of May.

=== Tributaries ===
The Siligir has some very large tributaries, such as the 169 km (105 mi) long Onnyo-Siligir (Russian: Оннё-Силигир; Yakut: Өнньүө Силигир) and the 128 km (80 mi) long Siligirkeen (Силигиркээн), both from the left.

== Fauna ==
The main fish species found in the waters of the Siligir are lenok, taimen, grayling, pike and perch. In some stretches there are whitefish and nelma.

== See also ==
- List of rivers of Russia
- Oil sands
