= Salkay Island =

Island in the Laptev Sea

Coordinates: 73°20′17″N 118°45′04″E

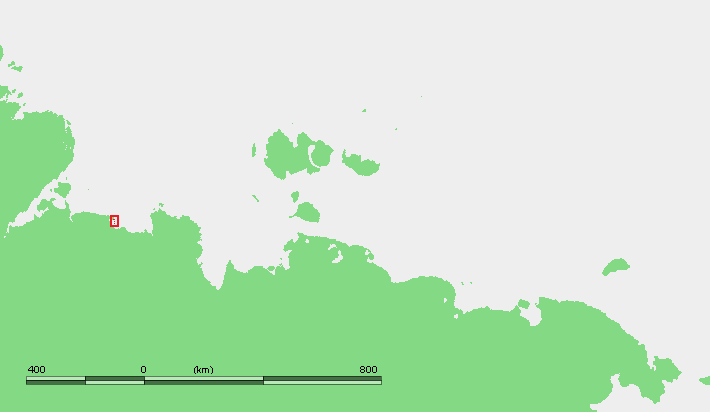
Location of Salkay Island and its neighboring islands in the Laptev Sea.

Salkay Island, or Salkay Aryta, is an island in the Laptev Sea. It is located on the western side of the Olenek Bay, about 40 kilometres (25 mi) to the WNW from the Olenek Delta. Its length is 7 kilometres (4.3 mi) and its maximum breadth 3 kilometres (1.9 mi). The name of this island can be also spelt as "Salkhay" and "Salkyy".

- Only 1.5 kilometres (0.93 mi) to the north there is another island, Orto Ary. It is slightly smaller, 5 kilometres (3.1 mi) long and 2.7 kilometres (1.7 mi) wide.
- Daldalakh is an island immediately north of Orto-Ary which is almost attached to the mainland, separated from it by a very narrow canal on its northwestern side. Daldalakh is 5.5 kilometres (3.4 mi) long and 3.3 kilometres (2.1 mi) wide.

The area where these islands lie is subject to severe Arctic weather with frequent gales and blizzards. The sea around these islands is frozen for about nine months every year so that they all are merged with the mainland most of the time.
