= Bur (river) =

River in Yakutia (Sakha Republic), Russia

Bur Бур / Буур
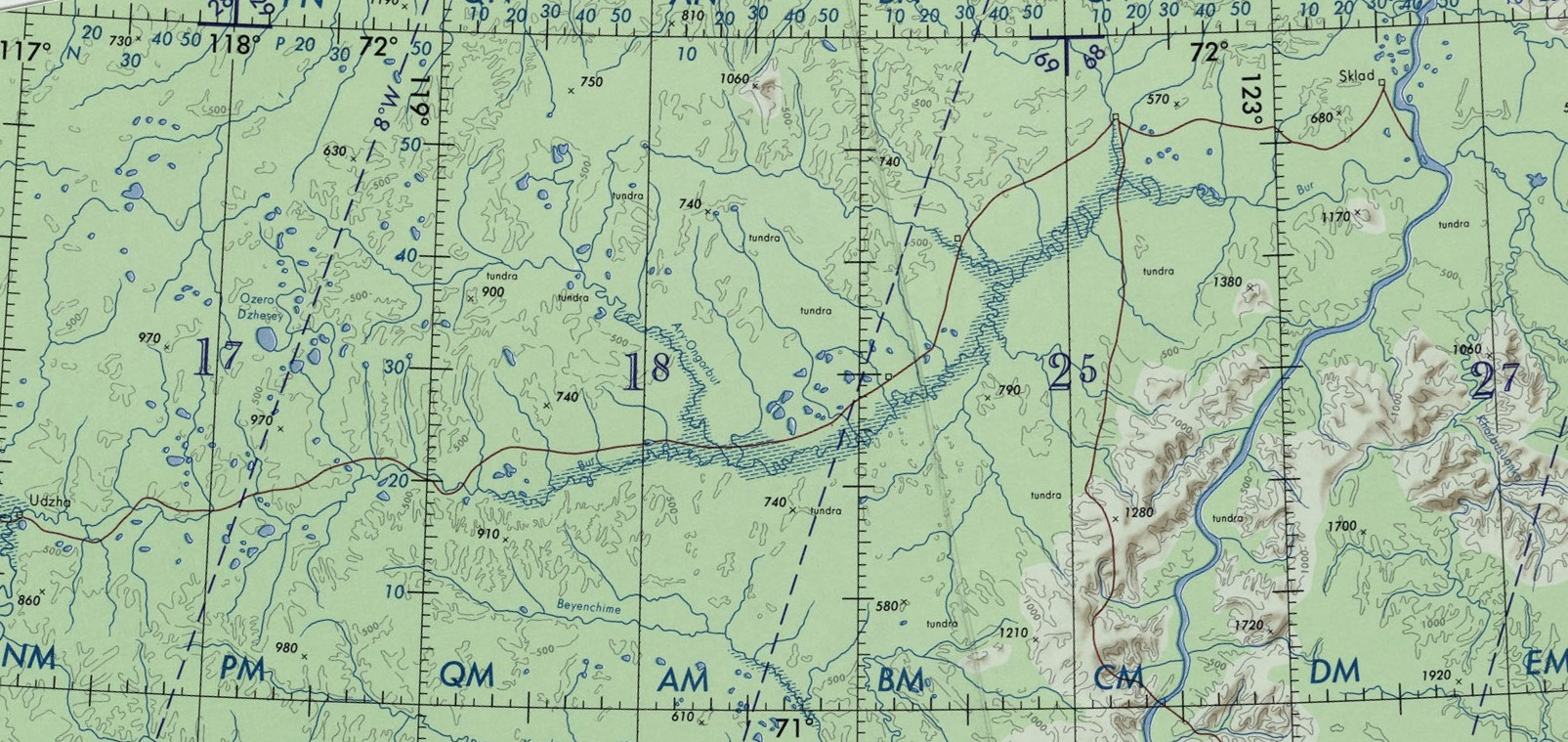
- Course of the Bur map section

- Mouth location in Yakutia, Russia Bur (river) (Russia)

Location
- Country: Russia

Physical characteristics
- Source
  - location: North Siberian Lowland
  - coordinates: 71°4′18″N 118°13′39″E
  - elevation: 140 m (460 ft)
- Mouth: Olenyok
  - coordinates: 71°47′22″N 123°42′14″E
  - elevation: 3 m (9.8 ft)
- Length: 501 km (311 mi)
- Basin size: 13,900 km^{2} (5,400 sq mi)
- Discharge
  - average: 80 m^{3}/s (2,800 cu ft/s)

Basin features
- Progression: Olenyok→Laptev Sea

The Bur (Russian: Бур; Yakut: Буур, Buur) is a river in Yakutia (Sakha Republic), Russia. It is the second largest tributary of the Olenyok with a length of 501 kilometres (311 mi). Its drainage basin area is 13,900 square kilometres (5,400 mi^{2}).

The river flows north of the Arctic Circle across a lonely, desolate area devoid of settlements. The river basin is mostly in Olenyoksky District, with the lower course section in Bulunsky District.

== Course ==
The Bur is a left tributary of the Olenyok. Its sources are in a hilly area of the North Siberian Lowland, in the vicinity of the sources of the Udya and the Buolkalakh. It flows across a marshy floodplain with small lakes, meandering strongly and flowing roughly eastwards north of the Beyenchime. Finally it joins the left bank of the Olenyok river 217 km (135 mi) upstream of its mouth. The confluence is only a little downstream from the mouth of the Khorbusuonka in the opposite bank.

The river is frozen between early October and late May. The Bur has several very long tributaries, such as the 191 kilometres (119 mi) long Ary-Ongorbut, the 137 kilometres (85 mi) long Kyra-Khos-Toryuttyakh and the 105 kilometres (65 mi) long Noyuo from the left, as well as the 93 kilometres (58 mi) long Kyuntyukelyakh from the right.

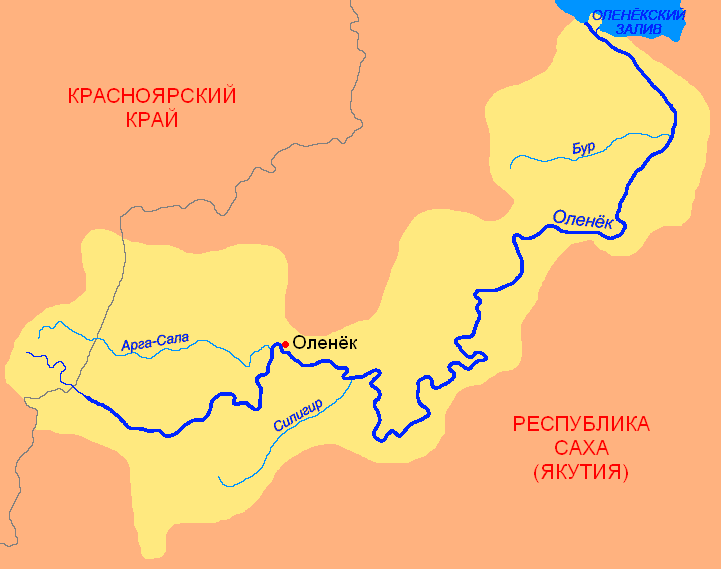
Olenyok basin with the Bur in the upper right.

== Flora and fauna ==
The river flows north of the Arctic Circle across swamps and forest-tundra. The distribution of permafrost is continuous.

The waters of the river are clean. Among the fish species found in the Bur lenok, muksun, nelma, omul, whitefish, taimen, grayling and pike deserve mention.

== See also ==
- List of rivers of Russia
