= Uele =

Uele may refer to:

- Uele River, a river in the Democratic Republic of the Congo
- Uele (Yakutia), a river in Russia
- Uélé Province, a former province of the Democratic Republic of the Congo
  - Bas-Uélé
  - Haut-Uélé
- Uele District, former district in Congo Free State
