= Malaya Kuonamka =

River in Yakutia (Sakha Republic), Russia

Malaya Kuonamka Малая Куонамка / Кыра Куонамка
- Mouth location in Yakutia, Russia Malaya Kuonamka (Russia)

Location
- Country: Russian Federation
- Federal subject: Yakutia
- District: Anabarsky District

Physical characteristics
- Source
  - location: Anabar Plateau
  - coordinates: 69°25′29″N 112°15′04″E
  - elevation: 375 m (1,230 ft)
- Mouth: Anabar
  - coordinates: 70°46′16″N 113°20′13″E
  - elevation: 16 m (52 ft)
- Length: 457 km (284 mi)
- Basin size: 24,800 km^{2} (9,600 sq mi)

Basin features
- Progression: Anabar→Laptev Sea

The Malaya Kuonamka (Russian: Малая Куонамка; Yakut: Кыра Куонамка, Kıra Kuonamka) is a river in Yakutia (Sakha Republic), Russia. It is a right tributary of the Anabar with a length of 457 kilometres (284 mi). Its drainage basin area is 24,800 square kilometres (9,600 mi^{2}).

The river flows north of the Arctic Circle, in the northern limits of the Central Siberian Plateau and the North Siberian Lowland. The area is very cold and desolate, devoid of settlements.

The Kuonamka Formation is a Cambrian large igneous province in the northeastern Siberian platform.

== Course ==
The Malaya Kuonamka "Little Kuonamka" is the second largest tributary of the Anabar. The river has its source in an elevated swamp at an altitude of 375 m (1,230 ft) in the eastern side of the Anabar Plateau. Together with the 559 km (347 mi) long Bolshaya Kuonamka "Big Kuonamka" to the west, it is one of the two rivers that form the Anabar at their confluence. In their last stretch both rivers flow roughly northwards. Finally they meet where the Anabar river proper begins, 380 km (240 mi) from its mouth in the Laptev Sea.

The river is fed by rain and snow. It is frozen between late September and late May. The longest tributaries are the 223 kilometres (139 mi) long Usumuun (Усумуун), the 217 kilometres (135 mi) long Delinde (Дьэлиндэ), as well as the 198 kilometres (123 mi) long Maspaaki (Маспаакы) from the right.

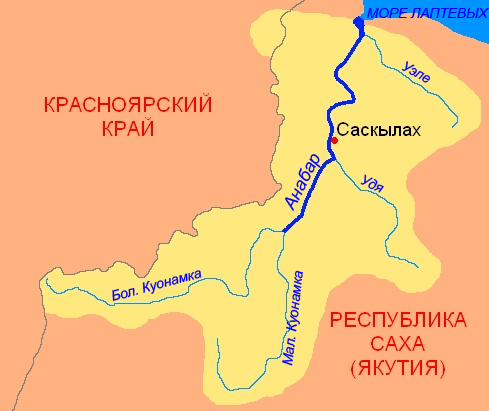
Basin of the Anabar.

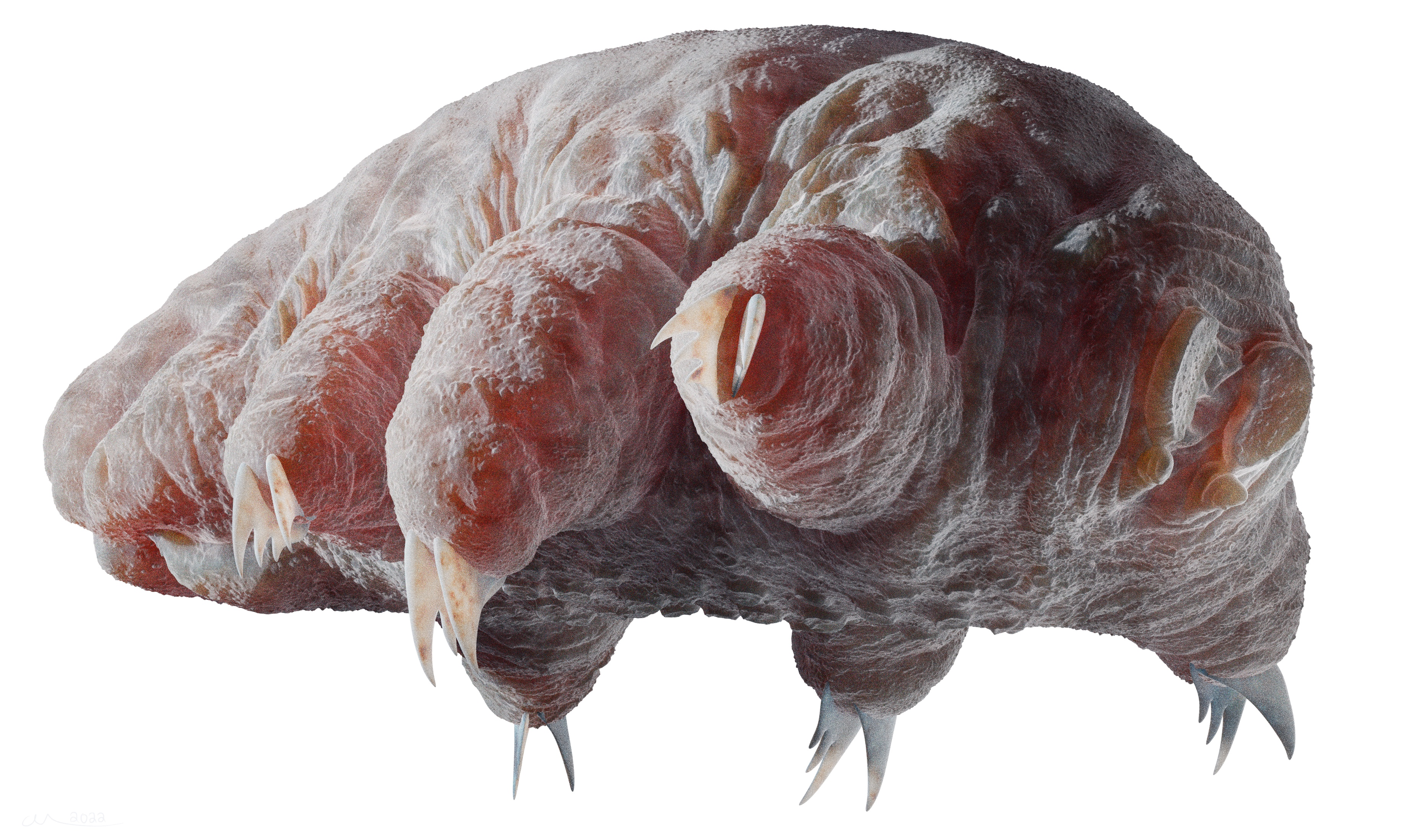
A reconstruction of the Siberian “Orsten” Tardigrade, from the Cambrian Kuonamka Formation.

== Fauna ==
The main fish species in the river are grayling, taimen and whitefish.

== See also ==
- List of rivers of Russia
