= Ukukit =

River in Yakutia (Sakha Republic), Russia

Ukukit Укукит
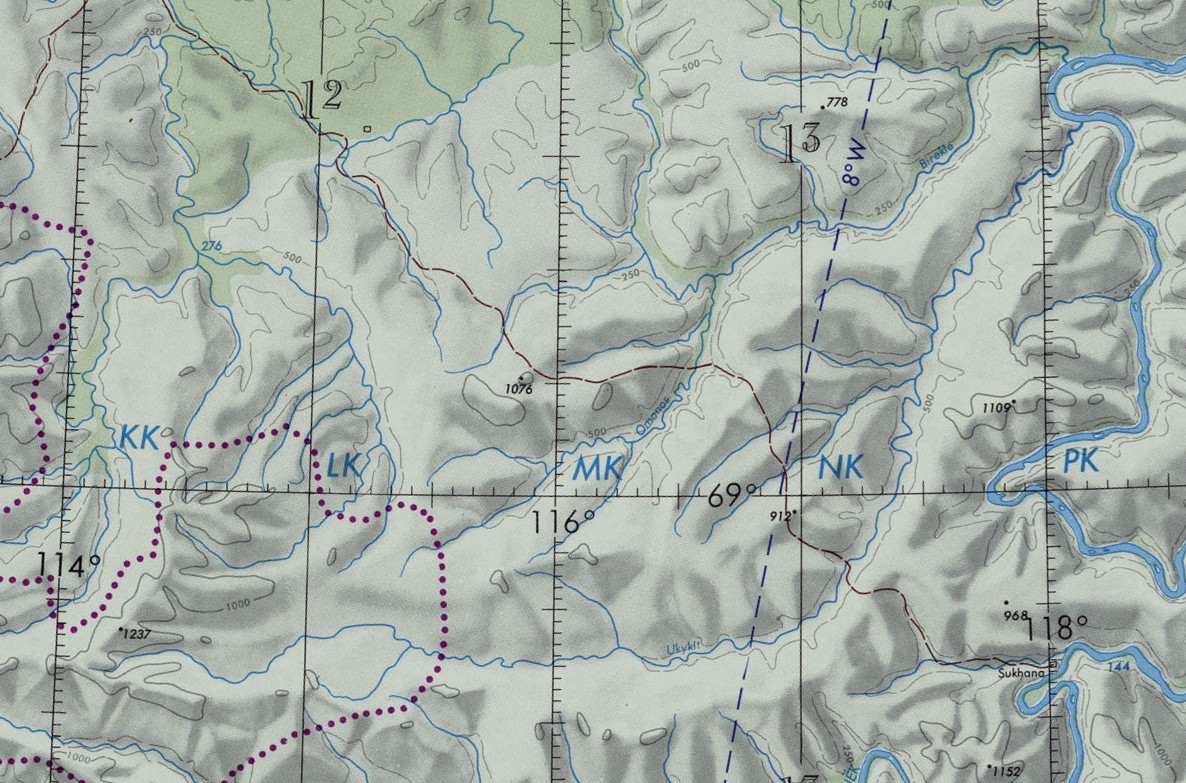
- Course of the Ukukit ONC map section

- Mouth location in Yakutia, Russia Ukukit (Russia)

Location
- Country: Russian Federation
- Federal subject: Yakutia
- District: Olenyoksky District

Physical characteristics
- Source
  - location: Central Siberian Plateau
  - coordinates: 68°43′31″N 114°07′50″E
  - elevation: 272 m (892 ft)
- Mouth: Olenyok
  - coordinates: 69°32′29″N 118°11′05″E
  - elevation: 36 m (118 ft)
- Length: 347 km (216 mi)
- Basin size: 5,000 km^{2} (1,900 sq mi)

Basin features
- Progression: Olenyok→Laptev Sea

The Ukukit (Russian: Укукит) is a river in Yakutia (Sakha Republic), Russia. It is a tributary of the Olenyok with a length of 347 kilometres (216 mi). Its drainage basin area is 5,000 square kilometres (1,900 mi^{2}).

The river flows north of the Arctic Circle across a lonely, desolate area of the Olenyoksky District devoid of settlements. In the 1980s kimberlite dikes were discovered by geologists in the basin of the Ukukit.

== Course ==
The Ukukit is a left tributary of the Olenyok. Its sources are in the northeastern corner of the Central Siberian Plateau. It heads first eastwards and, about halfway down its course, it bends and flows roughly northeastwards. Finally the river joins the left bank of the Olenyok 13 km (8.1 mi) upstream from the confluence of the Birekte, 682 km (424 mi) upstream of its mouth.

The Ukukit is fed by rain and snow. It is frozen between early October and late May or early June. Its longest tributary is the 70 kilometres (43 mi) long Kutuguna from the left.

== See also ==
- List of rivers of Russia
- Dike (geology)
