= Birekte =

River in Yakutia (Sakha Republic), Russia

Birekte Биректе / Билэктэ
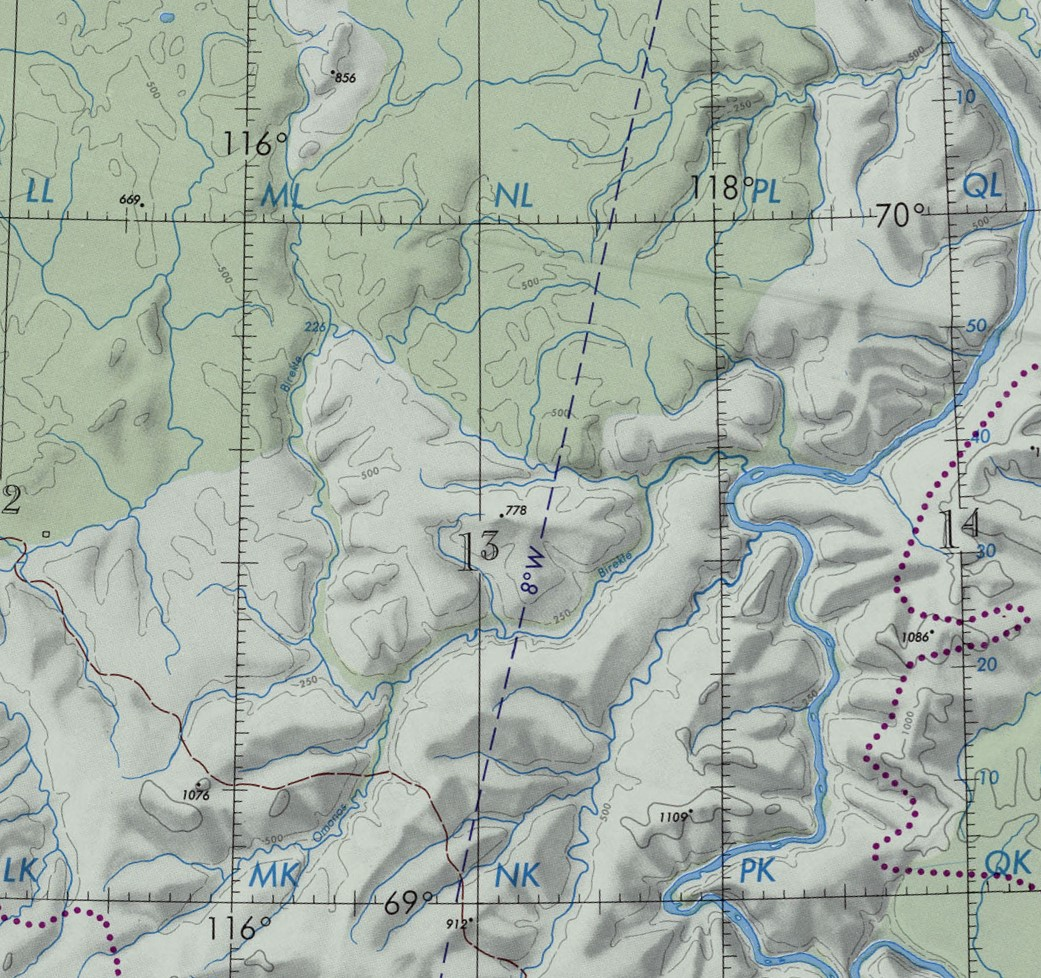
- Course of the Birekte ONC map section

- Mouth location in Yakutia, Russia Birekte (Russia)

Location
- Country: Russian Federation
- Federal subject: Yakutia
- District: Olenyoksky District

Physical characteristics
- Source
  - location: Central Siberian Plateau
  - coordinates: 70°16′05″N 116°49′33″E
- Mouth: Olenyok
  - coordinates: 69°37′34″N 118°07′56″E
  - elevation: 36 m (118 ft)
- Length: 315 km (196 mi)
- Basin size: 8,600 km^{2} (3,300 sq mi)

Basin features
- Progression: Olenyok→Laptev Sea

The Birekte (Russian: Биректе; Yakut: Билэктэ, Bilekte) is a river in Yakutia (Sakha Republic), Russia. It is a tributary of the Olenyok with a length of 315 kilometres (196 mi). Its drainage basin area is 8,600 square kilometres (3,300 mi^{2}).

The river flows north of the Arctic Circle, across a lonely, desolate area devoid of settlements.

== Course ==
The Birekte is a left tributary of the Olenyok. Its sources are in the northern fringes of the Central Siberian Plateau. It heads first southwards and, after the confluence of the Omonos, it flows roughly northeastwards. Finally it joins the left bank of the Olenyok river 13 km (8.1 mi) downstream from the confluence of the Ukukit, 669 km (416 mi) upstream of its mouth.

The river is fed by rain and snow. It is frozen between early October and late May. The longest tributary is the 140 kilometres (87 mi) long Omonos (Омоноос) from the right.

== See also ==
- List of rivers of Russia
- Birekte terrane
