= Beyenchime =

River in Yakutia (Sakha Republic), Russia

Beyenchime Беенчиме / Бэйэнчимэ
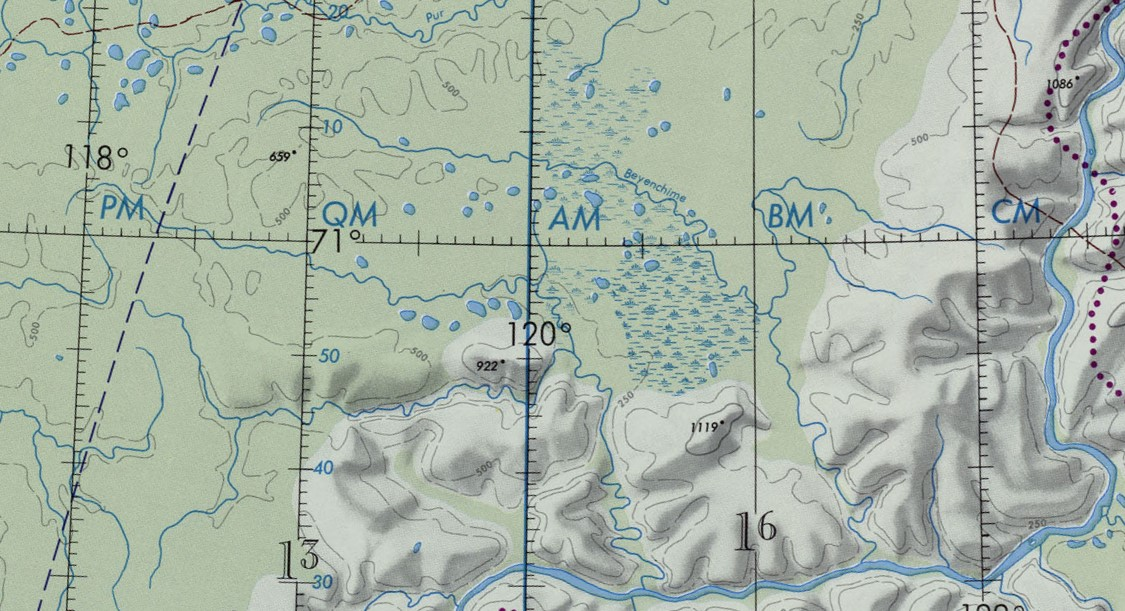
- Course of the Beyenchime ONC map section

- Mouth location in Yakutia, Russia Beyenchime (Russia)

Location
- Country: Russian Federation
- Federal subject: Yakutia
- District: Olenyoksky District

Physical characteristics
- Source
  - location: Central Siberian Plateau
  - coordinates: 71°10′30″N 118°45′33″E
  - elevation: 123 m (404 ft)
- Mouth: Olenyok
  - coordinates: 70°32′17″N 121°29′21″E
  - elevation: 21 m (69 ft)
- Length: 311 km (193 mi)
- Basin size: 4,080 km^{2} (1,580 sq mi)

Basin features
- Progression: Olenyok→Laptev Sea

The Beyenchime (Russian: Беенчиме Yakut: Бэйэнчимэ, Beyençime) is a river in Yakutia (Sakha Republic), Russia. It is a tributary of the Olenyok with a length of 311 kilometres (193 mi). Its drainage basin area is 4,080 square kilometres (1,580 mi^{2}).

The river flows north of the Arctic Circle across a lonely, desolate area of the Olenyoksky District devoid of settlements. The Beyenchime-Udzha interfluve is an area where diamonds are found.

== Course ==
The Beyenchime is a left tributary of the Olenyok. Its sources are at the limit of the Northern Siberian Lowland, in the vicinity of the sources of the Bur and the Udya. It flows roughly eastwards to the south of the Bur and to the north of the Kuoika. To the south and southwest of its middle course there is a large area dotted with lakes. In its last stretch the Beyenchime turns into the Central Siberian Plateau and heads in a SSE direction until its mouth in the Olenyok, 434 km (270 mi) from its mouth.

The river is frozen between early October and late May and may cause floods in the summer. Its main tributaries are the 71 kilometres (44 mi) long Beyemchikeen (Бэйэмчикээн) and the 129 kilometres (80 mi) long Beyenchime Salaata (Бэйэнчимэ-Салаата) from the left. There is an impact crater south of the lower course of the Beyenchime Salaata.

== See also ==
- Beyenchime-Salaata crater
- List of rivers of Russia
