= Merchimden =

River in Yakutia (Sakha Republic), Russia

Merchimden Мерчимден
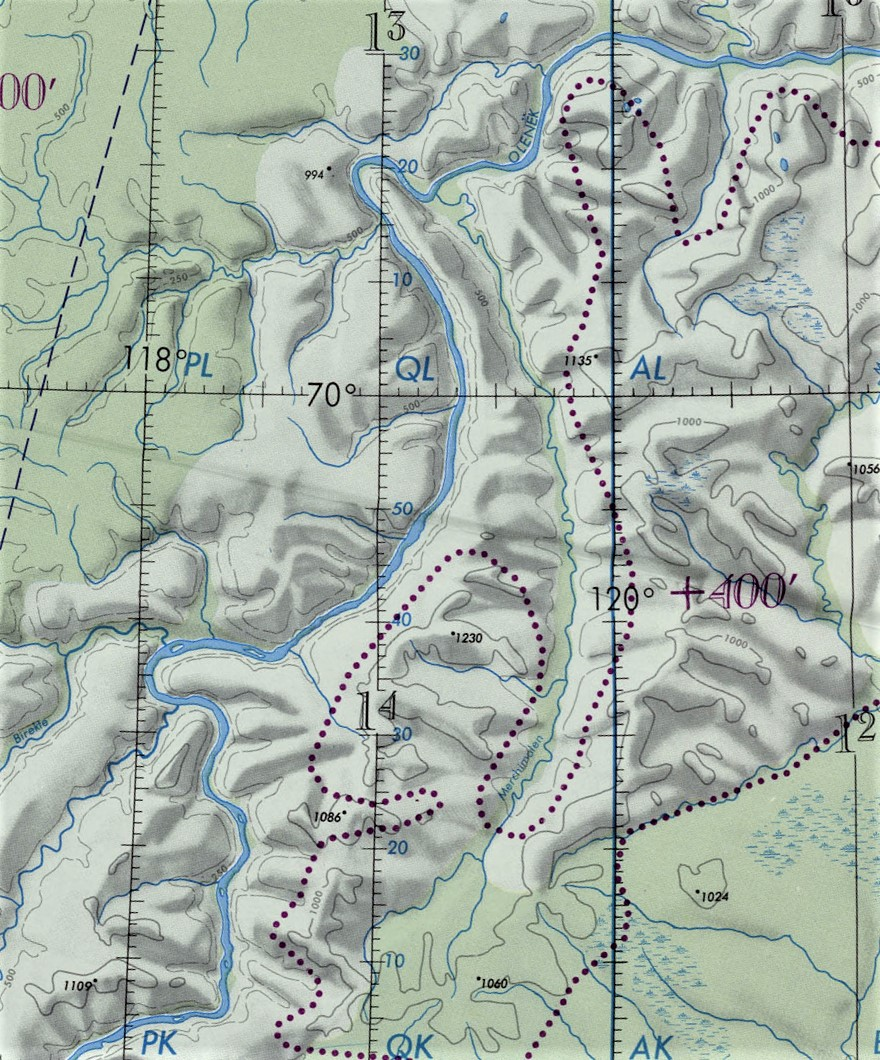
- Course of the Merchimden ONC map section

- Mouth location in Yakutia, Russia Merchimden (Russia)

Location
- Country: Russia

Physical characteristics
- Source
  - location: Central Siberian Plateau
  - coordinates: 69°12′01.4″N 118°52′09.4″E
- Mouth: Olenyok
  - coordinates: 70°17′24.8″N 119°15′15.2″E
- Length: 218 km (135 mi) (344 km (214 mi))
- Basin size: 4,080 km^{2} (1,580 sq mi)

Basin features
- Progression: Olenyok→Laptev Sea

The Merchimden (Russian: Мерчимден) is a river in Yakutia (Sakha Republic), Russia. It is a tributary of the Olenyok with a length of 218 kilometres (135 mi) and a drainage basin area of 4,080 square kilometres (1,580 mi^{2}).

The river flows north of the Arctic Circle across a lonely, desolate area of Olenyoksky District devoid of settlements.

== Course ==
The Merchimden originates in the eastern fringes of the Central Siberian Plateau, very near the sources of the east-flowing Motorchuna. The river flows initially to the northeast, then roughly northwards all along its course, parallel to the Olenyok flowing in the same direction a little further to the west. In its last stretch it meanders very strongly. Finally it meets the right bank of the Olenyok 539 km (335 mi) from its mouth. The confluence is just a little downstream from a very strong eastward bend of the Olenyok. There are a few small lakes just east of the confluence.

The river is frozen between the first half of October and early June.

=== Tributaries ===
The main tributaries of the Merchimden are the 46 km (29 mi) long Khayalaakh-Yurekh (Хайалаах-Юрэх) and the 40 km (25 mi) long Magan-Khayalaakh (Маган-Хайалаах) from the left, as well as the 28 km (17 mi) long Pastaakh-Yurekh (Паастаах-Юрэх) and the 27 km (17 mi) long Ulakhan-Kurung-Yurekh (Улахан-Курунг-Юрэх) from the right.

== See also ==
- List of rivers of Russia
