= Alakit =

River in Yakutia (Sakha Republic), Russia

Alakit Алакит
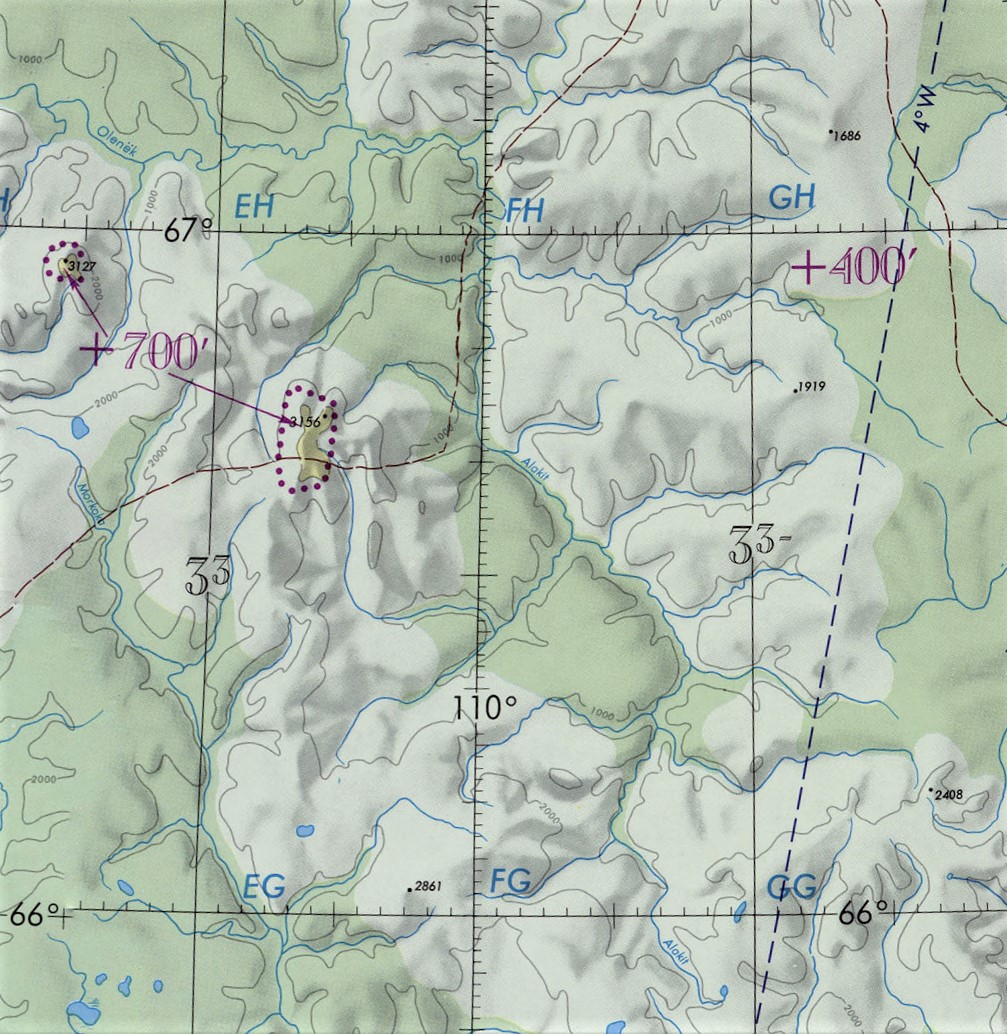
- Course of the Alakit ONC map section

- Mouth location in Yakutia, Russia Alakit (Russia)

Location
- Country: Russia

Physical characteristics
- Source
  - location: Alakit-Kyuel
  - coordinates: 65°53′21″N 110°53′51″E
  - elevation: 628 m (2,060 ft)
- Mouth: Olenyok
  - coordinates: 67°07′41″N 109°54′16″E 67°07′41″N 109°54′16″E
  - elevation: 197 m (646 ft)
- Length: 232 km (144 mi) (344 km (214 mi))
- Basin size: 11,800 km^{2} (4,600 sq mi)

Basin features
- Progression: Olenyok→Laptev Sea

The Alakit (Russian: Алакит) is a river in Yakutia (Sakha Republic), Russia. It is a tributary of the Olenyok with a length of 232 kilometres (144 mi) and a drainage basin area of 11,800 square kilometres (4,600 mi^{2}).

The river flows across a desolate area of Mirninsky and Olenyoksky districts. Currently there are no settlements, but a small village named Alakit was located by the river in its upper course, a little upstream of the mouth of the Yuyose-Delingde, a left tributary.

The Daldyn-Alakit kimberlite field is located between the upper Alakit in the west and the Daldyn River by Udachnaya in the east.

== Course ==
The Alakit is a right tributary of the Olenyok. It originates in a small lake of the northeastern side of the Central Siberian Plateau. The river flows roughly northwestwards or northwards all along its course. In some stretches it forms meanders and there are lakes near its channel in certain sections of its course. Finally it meets the right bank of the Olenyok 1,868 km (1,161 mi) from its mouth.

The river is fed by rain and snow. Owing to the severe climate of the plateau it is frozen between early October and late May. The longest tributaries are the 95 kilometres (59 mi) long Lower Bolshaya Kounda and the 106 kilometres (66 mi) long Upper Bolshaya Kounda from the left, as well as the 127 kilometres (79 mi) long Mastaakh from the right.

== See also ==
- List of rivers of Russia
