= Kyuyutingde =

River in Yakutia (Sakha Republic), Russia

Kyuyutingde Кюютингдэ
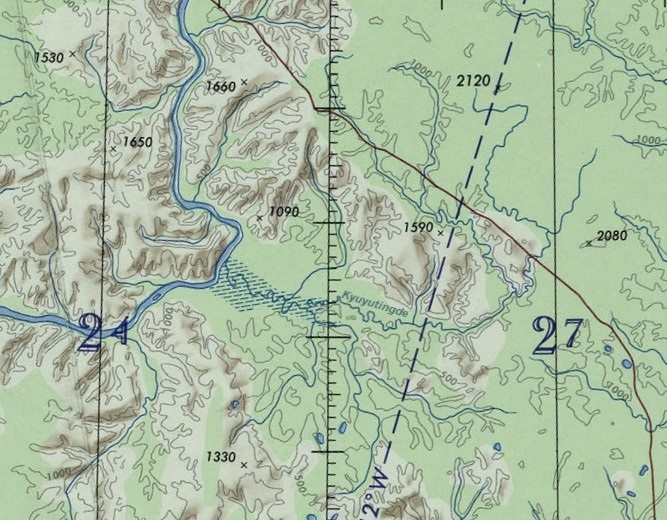
- Course of the Kyuyutingde ONC map section

- Mouth location in Yakutia, Russia Kyuyutingde (Russia)

Location
- Country: Russian Federation
- Federal subject: Yakutia
- District: Bulunsky District

Physical characteristics
- Source
  - location: Kystyk Plateau
- Mouth: Olenyok
  - coordinates: 70°35′14.2″N 122°32′37.3″E
- Length: 138 km (86 mi) (196 km (122 mi))
- Basin size: 3,420 km^{2} (1,320 sq mi)

Basin features
- Progression: Olenyok→Laptev Sea

The Kyuyutingde (Russian: Кюютингдэ) is a river in Yakutia (Sakha Republic), Russia. It is a tributary of the Olenyok with a length of 138 kilometres (86 mi) —196 km (122 mi) including the Debengde at its head— and a drainage basin area of 3,420 square kilometres (1,320 mi^{2}). It flows north of the Arctic Circle across a desolate area of Bulunsky District devoid of settlements and joins the Olenyok in its final major bend, where it begins to head northwards until the Laptev Sea.

The river gives its name to the Kyuyutingde Formation, a dolomite geological formation in the Olenyok Uplift.

== Course ==
The Kyuyutingde is a right tributary of the Olenyok. Its sources are at the southern end of the Kystyk Plateau at the confluence of the 58 kilometres (36 mi) long Debengde and the 40 kilometres (25 mi) long Sygynakhtaakh. It flows first in a roughly southeastern direction, then it bends southwestwards for a short stretch and bends finally westwards, heading in that direction until the Olenyok floodplain, where it enters a low, marshy area with many small lakes to the north. It meanders strongly until it joins the great river 392 km (244 mi) upstream of its mouth.

Owing to the harshness of the climate the river is frozen between early October and early June. Its longest tributaries are the 64 kilometres (40 mi) long Kharyalaakh from the right, as well as the 80 kilometres (50 mi) long Bulbarangda from the left.

== Bibliography ==
- С. Н. Серебряков, Peculiarities in the formation and accommodation of Riphean stromatolites in Siberia

== See also ==
- List of rivers of Russia
