= Suolama =

River in Siberia, Russia

Suolama Суолема / Суолама
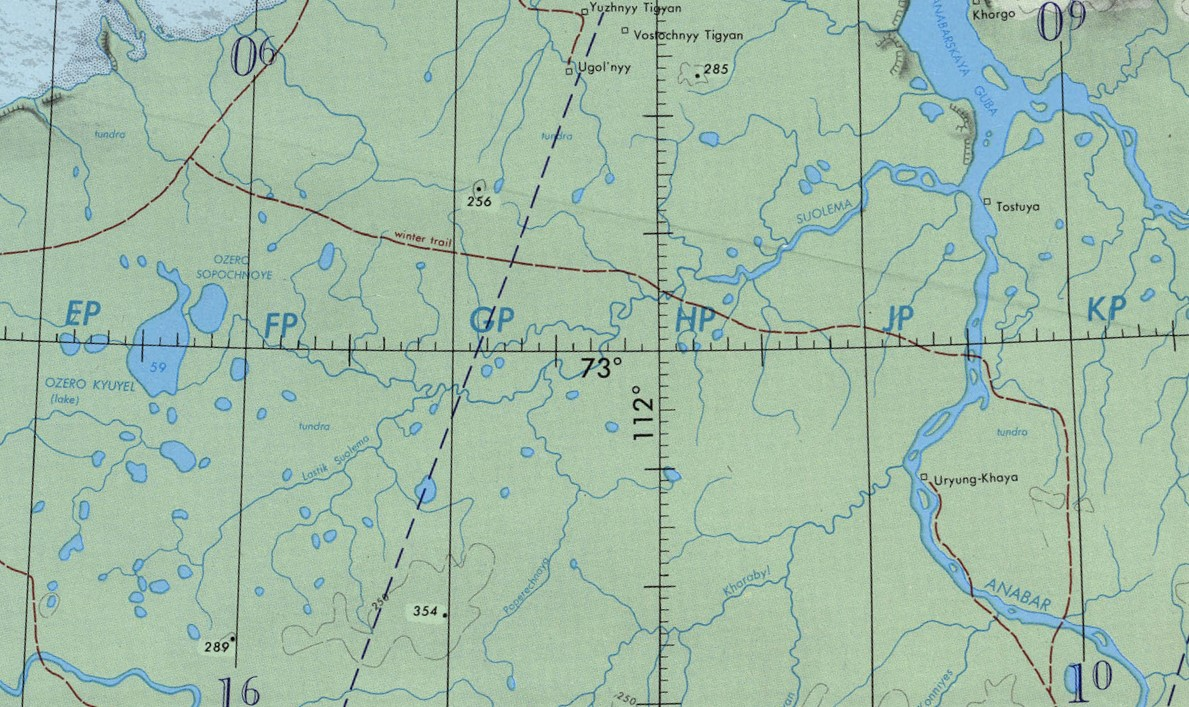
- Course of the Suolama ONC map section

- Mouth location in Yakutia, Russia Suolama (Russia)

Location
- Country: Russian Federation
- Federal subjects: Krasnoyarsk Krai; Yakutia
- Districts: Taymyrsky Dolgano-Nenetsky District & Anabarsky District

Physical characteristics
- Source
  - location: Kieng-Kyuel
  - coordinates: 72°56′30″N 109°41′26″E
  - elevation: 22 m (72 ft)
- Mouth: Anabar
  - location: Near Anabar Bay
  - coordinates: 73°13′07″N 113°27′46″E
  - elevation: 0.1 m (3.9 in)
- Length: 262 km (163 mi)
- Basin size: 7,440 km^{2} (2,870 sq mi)

Basin features
- Progression: Anabar→Laptev Sea

The Suolama (Russian: Суолема, Suolema; Yakut: Суолама) is a river in Krasnoyarsk Krai and Yakutia (Sakha Republic), Russia. It is a tributary of the Anabar with a length of 262 kilometres (163 mi). Its drainage basin area is 7,440 square kilometres (2,870 mi^{2}).

The river flows 730 km (450 mi) north of the Arctic Circle, from the Taymyrsky Dolgano-Nenetsky District of Krasnoyarsk Krai eastwards into the northwestern limit of coastal Yakutia. It is an area of permafrost, flat, lonely and desolate, devoid of settlements. The nearest inhabited place is Yuryung-Khaya.

== Course ==
The Suolama is a left tributary of the Anabar. Its sources are in the southeastern corner of fairly large Kieng-Kyuel lake of the North Siberian Lowland. It heads roughly eastwards / northeastwards all along its course within a swampy area with numerous lakes. Finally it joins the left bank of the Anabar only 0.8 km (0.50 mi) from its mouth. The confluence is just a little upstream of Anabar Bay.

The river is fed by rain and snow. Owing to the severe climate it is frozen between late September and early June. The longest tributaries are the 121 kilometres (75 mi) long Lastik (Ластик) and the 110 kilometres (68 mi) long Poperechnaya (Поперечная) from the right.

== See also ==
- List of rivers of Russia
