= Kukusunda =

River in Yakutia (Sakha Republic), Russia

Kukusunda Кукусунда / Кукуһунда
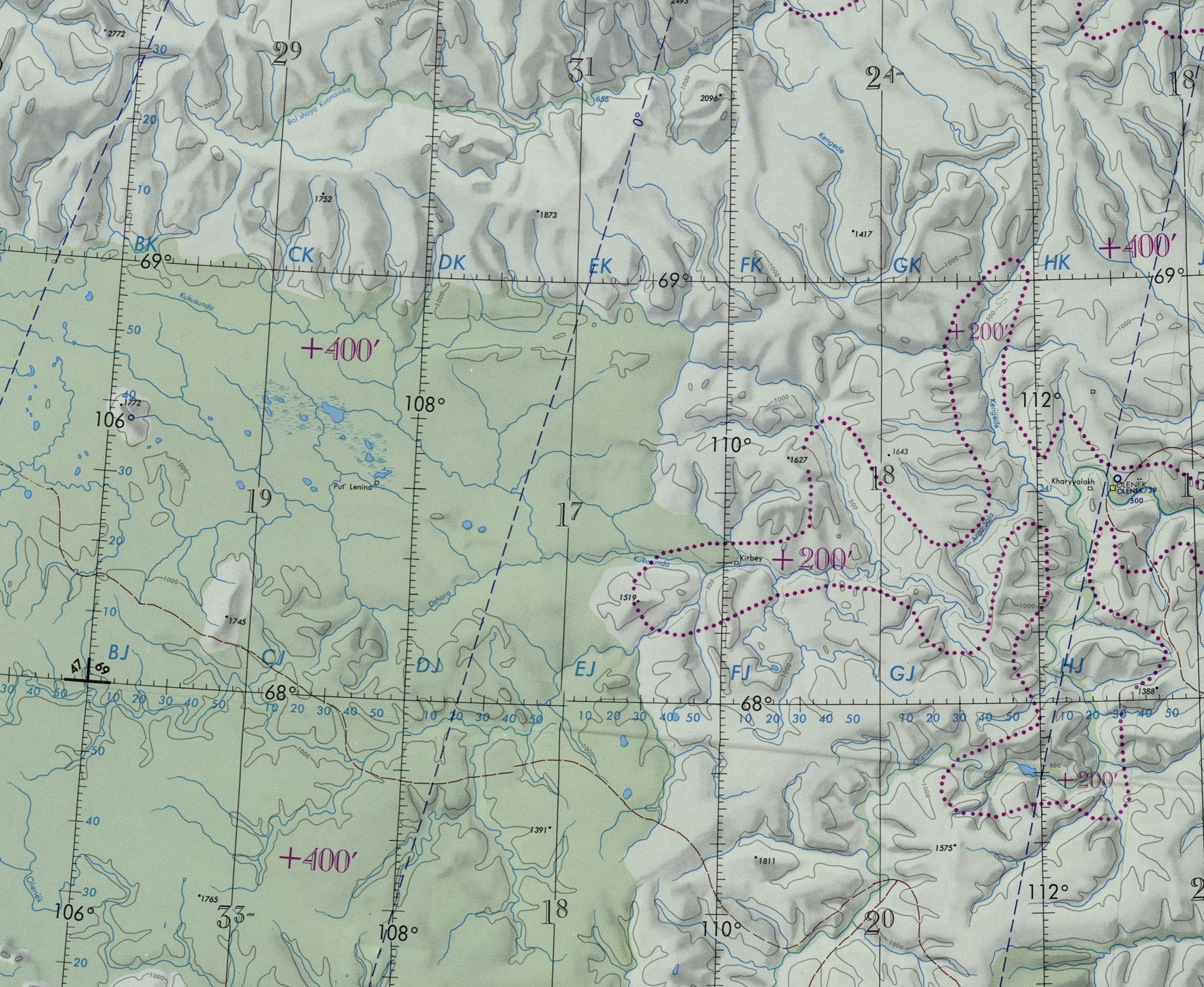
- Arga-Sala basin ONC map section with the Kukusunda in the lower part

- Mouth location in Yakutia, Russia Kukusunda (Russia)

Location
- Country: Russia

Physical characteristics
- Source
  - location: Anabar Plateau; Central Siberian Plateau
- Mouth: Arga-Sala
  - coordinates: 68°18′32″N 109°51′51″E
  - elevation: 108 m (354 ft)
- Length: 270 km (170 mi)
- Basin size: 14,200 km^{2} (5,500 sq mi)
- Discharge
  - average: 99 m^{3}/s (3,500 cu ft/s)

Basin features
- Progression: Arga-Sala→Olenyok→Laptev Sea

The Kukusunda (Russian: Кукусунда; Yakut: Кукуһунда, Kukuhunda) is a river in Yakutia (Sakha Republic) and Krasnoyarsk Krai, Russia. It is the longest tributary of the Arga-Sala, of the Olenyok basin, and has a length of 270 kilometres (170 mi) and a drainage basin area of 14,200 square kilometres (5,500 mi^{2}).

The river flows across an uninhabited area of Olenyoksky District marked by permafrost. A small stretch of its source area falls within the Evenkiysky District of Krasnoyarsk Krai. The nearest settlement is Olenyok village, located about 200 km (120 mi) to the east of its mouth.

== Course ==
The Kukusunda is a left tributary of the Arga-Sala. Its sources are in the southern part of the Anabar Plateau, part of the Central Siberian Plateau, south of an area of lakes. In its upper course the river flows across a wide floodplain where its channel forms meanders. The river flows roughly eastwards and southeastwards. Then it finally joins the left bank of the Arga-Sala river 180 km (110 mi) from its mouth.

The Kukusunda is fed mainly by snow. It is frozen yearly between mid October and the end of May or the beginning of June.

=== Tributaries ===
The main tributaries of the Kukusunda are the 200 km (120 mi) long Dyara (Дьара) from the right, as well as the 69 km (43 mi) long Kharaga-Suokh (Харага-Суох) and the 86 km (53 mi) long Lamuyka (Ламуйка) from the left.

== Flora and fauna ==
The river and its tributaries flow across an area covered by typical Siberian taiga, composed mainly of larch and pine. The main fish species in the Kukusunda are lenok, muksun, nelma, omul, least cisco, whitefish, taimen, grayling and pike.

== See also ==
- List of rivers of Russia
