= Kuoyka =

River in Yakutia (Sakha Republic), Russia

Kuoyka Куойка
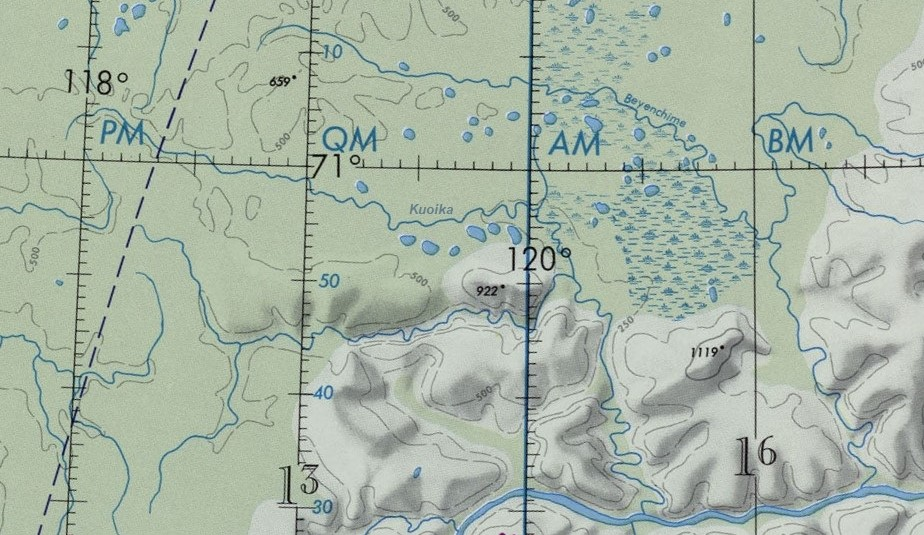
- Course of the Kuoyka ONC map section

- Mouth location in Yakutia, Russia Kuoyka (Russia)

Location
- Country: Russian Federation
- Federal subject: Yakutia
- District: Olenyoksky District

Physical characteristics
- Source
  - location: North Siberian Lowland
  - coordinates: 71°03′51″N 117°52′06″E
  - elevation: ca 175 m (574 ft)
- Mouth: Olenyok
  - coordinates: 70°29′06″N 120°31′36″E
  - elevation: 24 m (79 ft)
- Length: 294 km (183 mi)
- Basin size: 4,750 km^{2} (1,830 sq mi)

Basin features
- Progression: Olenyok→Laptev Sea

The Kuoyka or Kuoika (Russian: Куойка; Yakut: Куойка) is a river in Yakutia (Sakha Republic), Russian Federation. It is a tributary of the Olenyok with a length of 294 kilometres (183 mi) and a drainage basin area of 4,750 square kilometres (1,830 mi^{2}). The Kuoyka flows north of the Arctic Circle across a lonely, desolate area of the Olenyoksky District devoid of settlements.

The name of the river comes from the Nganasan word "kuoika", (куойка), meaning a household deity.

== Course ==
The Kuoika is a left tributary of the Olenyok. Its sources are at the limit of the Northern Siberian Lowland, off the northeastern end of the Central Siberian Plateau. It flows roughly eastwards to the southwest and south of the Beyenchime in an area with numerous lakes. In its last stretch the Kuoika turns in a SSE direction entering the Central Siberian Plateau area. It meanders strongly in its southernmost section within a wide gorge until it meets the left bank of the Olenyok 473 km (294 mi) from its mouth.

The river is frozen between early October and early June. Its main tributary is the 169 kilometres (105 mi) long Sektelyakh from the right. Other tributaries are much shorter, such as the 42 kilometres (26 mi) long Kuchchugui-Kuoyka, the 39 kilometres (24 mi) long Kusagan-Khayalakh and the 36 kilometres (22 mi) long Oyur from the left.

== Quote ==
The last, tortuous stretch of the river was described in such terms by Yuri Tsenin in Vokrug sveta:

Its channel bends so whimsically in a wide canyon that sometimes one can't understand in which direction it flows. We are surrounded by lemon-yellow mountains. The shores of the Kuoika rise above the water as a fortified wall with odd-looking towers and ramparts.

== See also ==
- List of rivers of Russia
