= North Siberian Lowland =

Plain in Siberia, Russia

North Siberian Lowland Северо-Сибирская низменность / Хотугу Сибиир намтала
- Lowland
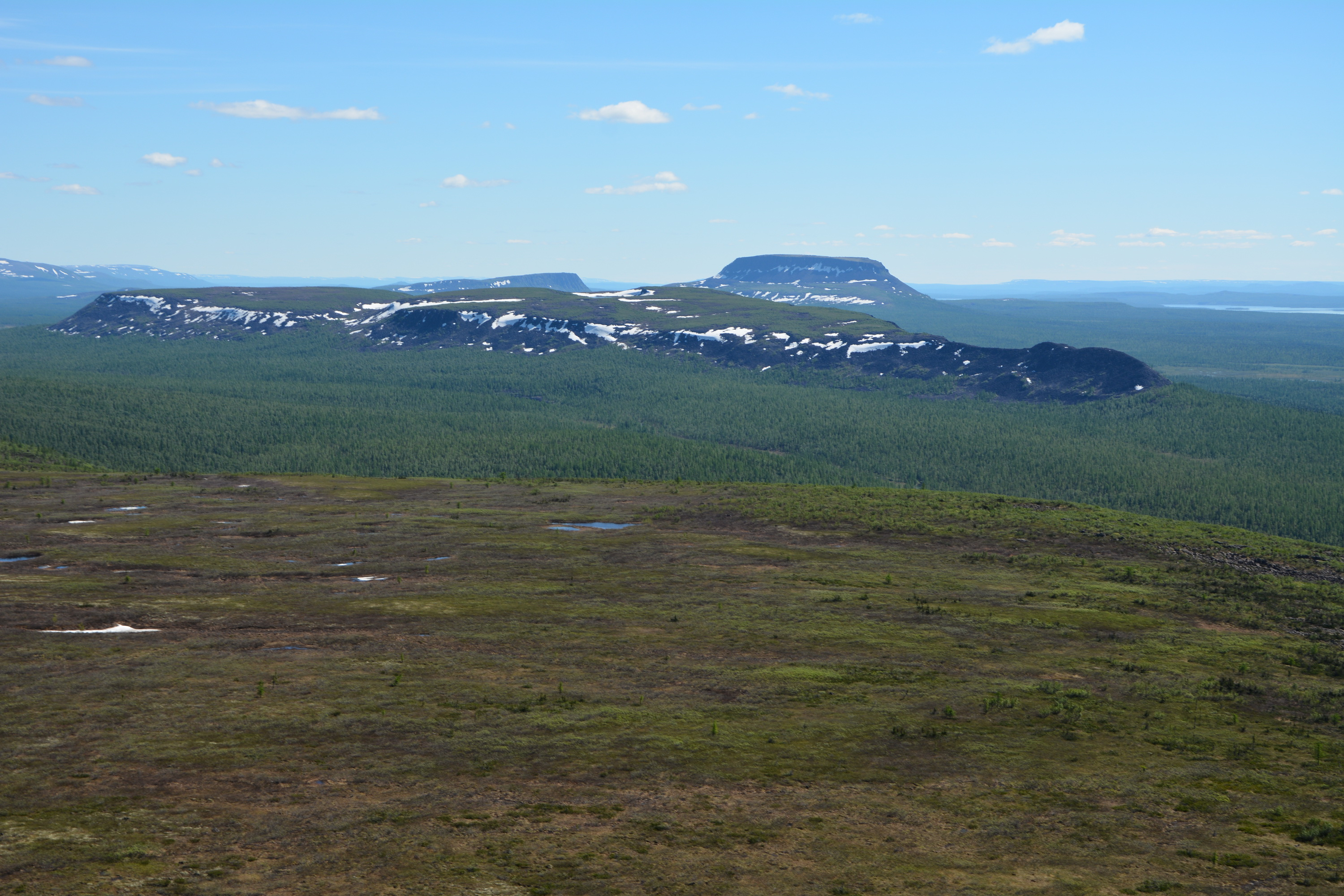
- Landscape of the North Siberian Lowland.

- North Siberian Lowland (Krasnoyarsk Krai)
- Coordinates: 72°N 101°E
- Location: Krasnoyarsk Krai, Russia
- Part of: Siberia

Dimensions
  - Length: 1,400 km (870 mi)
  - Width: 600 km (370 mi)
- Elevation: 0 meters (0 ft) to 300 meters (980 ft)

The North Siberian Lowland (Russian: Северо-Сибирская низменность, romanized: Severo-Sibirskaya nizmennost; Yakut: Хотугу Сибиир намтала, romanized: Xotugu Sibiir namtala), also known as Taymyr Lowland (Russian: Таймырская низменность, romanized: Taymyrskaya nizmennost), is a plain with a relatively flat relief separating the Byrranga Mountains of the Taymyr Peninsula in the north from the Central Siberian Plateau in the south. To the southeast of the Olenyok basin the lowland merges with the Central Yakutian Lowland.

The territory of the lowland is one of the Great Russian Regions. Administratively it is mostly part of the Krasnoyarsk Krai, with a small section in the Sakha Republic (Yakutia). The main towns are Dudinka, Norilsk and Khatanga.

== Geography ==
The North Siberian Lowland lies between the lower reaches of the Yenisey and Olenyok rivers in Krasnoyarsk Krai and Yakutia. It is 1,400 km long and up to 600 km wide. This lowland plain features flat-topped ridges approximately 200-300 m high, which rise over broad and heavily swamped degradations with a large number of thermokarst lakes.

Rivers Pyasina, Taymyra, Kheta and Kotuy flow over the North Siberian Lowland, as well as further east the Khatanga, Popigay, Kuoyka, Beyenchime, Bur, Buolkalakh, as well as the Anabar with its tributaries the Suolama and Udya, and the Uele. There are many lakes in the North Siberian Lowland, the biggest one is Lake Taymyr.

The North Siberian Lowland has deposits of oil, natural gas and coal (Taymyr Basin).

== Geology ==
The North Siberian Lowland is formed by marine and ice-laid deposits, underlaid with sandstones and argillites. Permafrost is a common phenomenon in this area.

== Climate and flora ==
The climate is subarctic continental with long (7–8 months) cold winters and short cool summers. Average temperature in January is −30 °C (−22 °F) in the West and down to −35 to −37 °C (−31 to −35 °F) in the East. Temperature in July is around 6–10 °C (43–50 °F). Snow cover stays for approximately 265 days. Precipitation is 250–300 millimetres (9.8–11.8 in) per year.

Sparse forest in the west consists mainly of Siberian larch. Eastern parts of the lowland are covered with Dahurian larch. Lichen tundra dominates northern parts of the lowland, while southern parts are full of shrubbery vegetation.

== See also ==
- Anabar Plateau
- Alas (geography)
