= Olenyok Airport =

- IATA: ONK; ICAO: UERO; LID: ОЛН

Summary
- Airport type: Public
- Serves: Olenyok, Olenyoksky District, Sakha Republic, Russia
- Elevation AMSL: 258 m / 846 ft
- Coordinates: 68°30′56″N 112°28′45″E

Maps
- Sakha Republic in Russia

- Location of the airport in the Sakha Republic
- Source: OurAirports, GCM, STV

Olenyok Airport (IATA: ONK, ICAO: UERO) is a public use airport in Olenyok, Sakha (Yakutia) Republic, Russia.

== Airlines and destinations ==
Airlines	Destinations
Polar Airlines	Yakutsk

== See also ==
- List of airports in Russia
