= Anabar Bay =

Gulf in the Laptev Sea

- Анабарский залив / Анаабыр хомото
- Map showing the location of Anabar Bay.

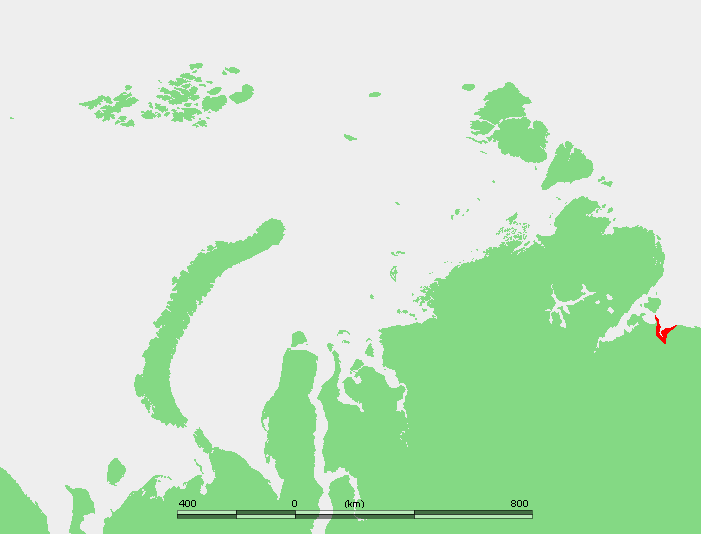
- Location: Far North
- Coordinates: 73°42′N 114°00′E
- River sources: Anabar, Tistyakh-Yuryage and Suolama
- Ocean/sea sources: Laptev Sea
- Basin countries: Russia
- Max. length: 67 km (42 mi)
- Max. width: 76 km (47 mi)
- Settlements: Khorgo and Tostuya (abandoned)

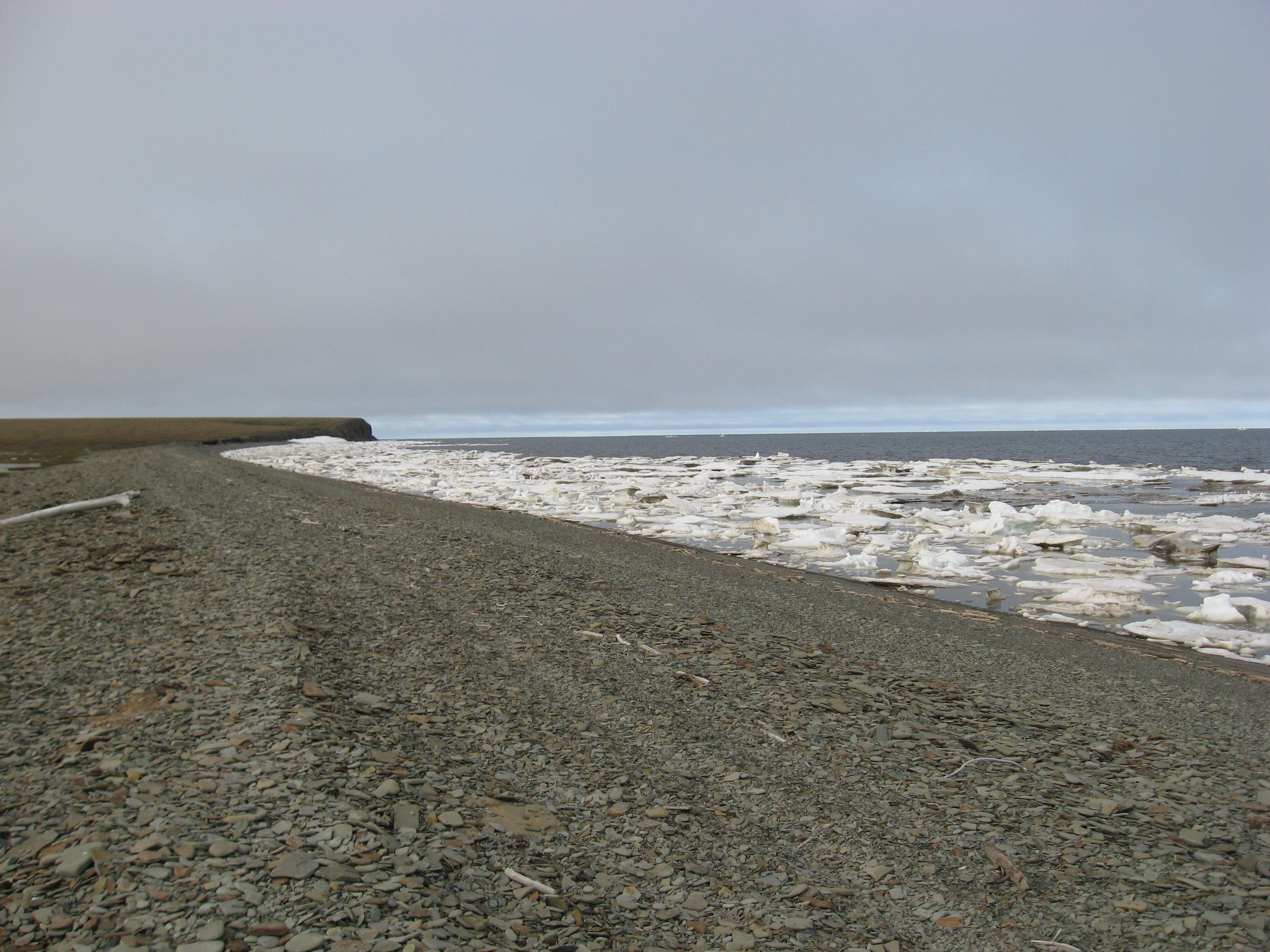
The shore of Anabar Bay

Anabar Bay (Russian: Анабарский залив, romanized: Anabarskiy Zaliv; Yakut: Анаабыр хомото, romanized: Anaabır Qomoto) is a gulf in the Laptev Sea. Lat 74° 30' and long 113° 15'. It stretches between the eastern cape off the mouth of the Anabar River and the Nordvik Peninsula. Nordvik Bay lies further west of it, beyond Cape Paksa at the tip of the peninsula.

== Geography ==
Anabar Bay opens towards the north and it is about 76 km in width. It includes the estuary of the Anabar River which is about 40 km long with an average width of 10 km. Three rivers have their mouths at the beginning of the estuary, the Anabar in the center, the Uele from the east, and the Suolama from the southwest.

The climate is Arctic and extremely severe, with prolonged, bitter winters so that the bay is covered by ice most of the year.

Anabar Bay and its surrounding area belongs to the Sakha Republic administrative division of the Russian Federation.

== Fauna ==
The Sibirskaya ryapushka fish often arrives in great numbers to the mouth of river Anabar.

== History ==
Baron Eduard Von Toll explored the Anabar Bay region in 1893. At that time it was a very little-known area of the Russian Arctic. He was the first one to map the plateau between the Anabar and Popigay Rivers.

There were two settlements in the Anabar Bay area, during Soviet times. One was Khorgo, at the mouth of the bay, and the other Tostuya, further inland at the point where the estuarine area begins.

== See also ==
- Russian polar expedition of 1900–1902
- Arctic Ocean Hydrographic Expedition
- Russian Hydrographic Service
