= Olenyok Gulf =

Gulf in the Laptev Sea

Coordinates: 73.3333°N 121°E

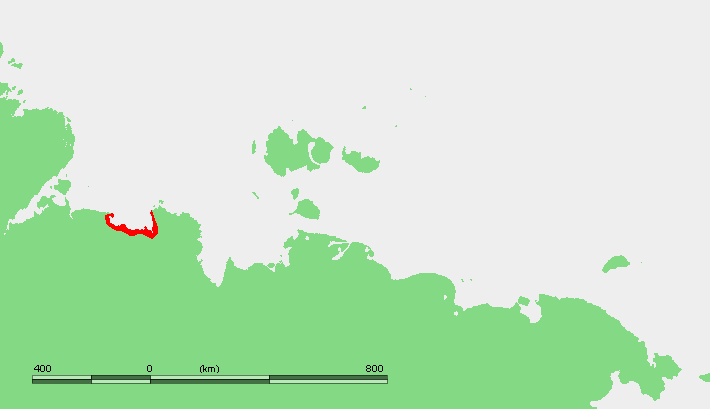
Map showing the location of the Olenyok Gulf.

The Olenyok Gulf, also known as Olenek Bay, (Russian: Оленёкский залив; Yakut: Өлөөн хомото, Ölöön xomoto) is a broad gulf in the Laptev Sea. It is located WSW of the huge Lena Delta, which forms its eastern limit.

There are some islands in the gulf, like Salkay Island in the west and Dzhyangylakh and Eppet in the mouths of the Olenyok River that empties into this gulf.

The Olenyok Gulf belongs to the Sakha administrative division of the Russian Federation.

== Ecology ==
Chars are common in the low-salinity waters of the Olenyok Gulf and genetic studies were conducted on them.

The flat shores of the bay are a natural habitat for birds such as waders.

== See also ==
- Vasili Pronchishchev
- William Barr, The First Soviet Convoy to the Mouth of the Lena.
