= Uele (Yakutia) =

River in Yakutia (Sakha Republic), Russia

Uele Уэле / Үөлэ
- Sentinel-2 picture of Anabar Bay with the Uele in the lower right

- Mouth location in Yakutia, Russia Uele (Yakutia) (Russia)

Location
- Country: Russia

Physical characteristics
- Source
  - location: Near lake Sobaka-Lakh
  - coordinates: 72°18′04″N 117°53′16″E
- Mouth: Anabar Bay; Laptev Sea
  - coordinates: 73°20′36″N 113°48′46″E
  - elevation: 0 m (0 ft)
- Length: 313 km (194 mi)
- Basin size: 19,200 km^{2} (7,400 sq mi)
- Discharge
  - average: 96 m^{3}/s (3,400 cu ft/s)

The Uele (Russian: Уэле; Yakut: Үөлэ, Üöle) is a river in Yakutia (Sakha Republic), Russia. It has a length of 313 kilometres (194 mi) and its drainage basin area is 19,200 square kilometres (7,400 mi^{2}). The river basin is a desolate area devoid of human settlements.

== Course ==
The Uele has its sources near lake Sobaka-Lakh in the North Siberian Lowland. The river flows roughly northwestwards in a winding channel across a floodplain with numerous lakes. Finally it enters the eastern side of the inner Anabar Bay just east of the mouth of the Anabar.

=== Tributaries ===
Its main tributaries are the Kraynyaya, Bayan, Darkylakh, Onkuchakh-Yuryakh and Salga from the right, as well as the Khatygyn-Uelete, Byorolyokh-Ayan and Sasyr-Tyobyulekh from the left.

== Fauna ==
The Uele is frozen most of the year. It stays under ice between the end of September/beginning of October and the end of May/beginning of June. The river is an important habitat for nelma, as recorded in the Red Data Book of the Russian Federation.

== See also ==
- List of rivers of Russia
