= Arga-Sala =

River in Yakutia (Sakha Republic), Russia

Arga-Sala Арга-Сала / Арҕаа Салаа
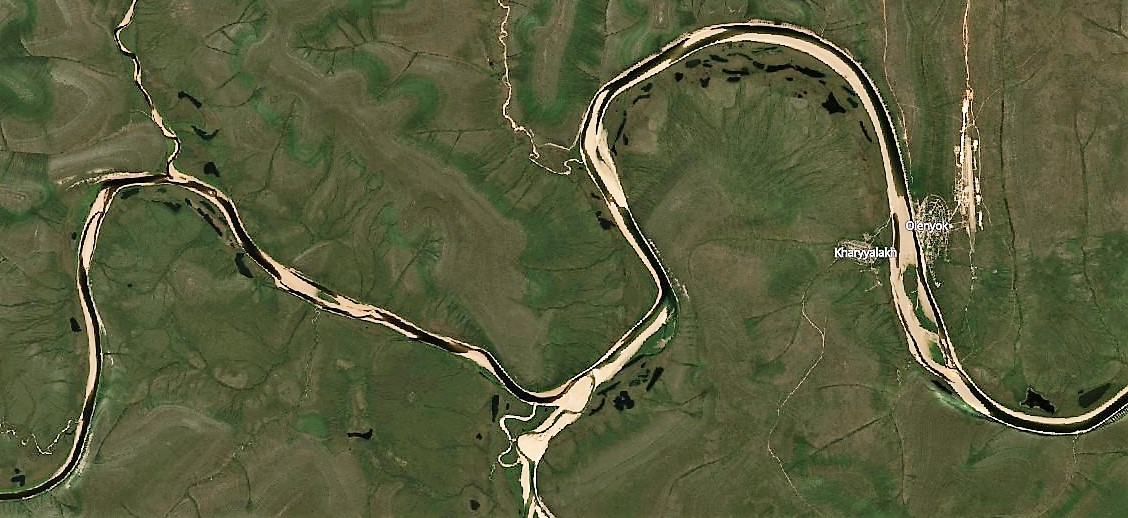
- Confluence of the Arga-Sala and the Olenyok Sentinel-2 image.

- Mouth location in Yakutia, Russia Arga-Sala (Russia)

Location
- Country: Russia

Physical characteristics
- Source
  - location: Central Siberian Plateau
  - coordinates: 67°54′10″N 105°16′12″E
  - elevation: 285 m (935 ft)
- Mouth: Olenyok
  - coordinates: 68°27′48″N 112°12′20″E
  - elevation: 108 m (354 ft)
- Length: 503 km (313 mi)
- Basin size: 47,700 km^{2} (18,400 sq mi)
- Discharge
  - average: 334 m^{3}/s (11,800 cu ft/s)

Basin features
- Progression: Olenyok→Laptev Sea

The Arga-Sala (Russian: Арга-Сала; Yakut: Арҕаа Салаа, Arğaa Salaa) is a river in Yakutia (Sakha Republic) and Krasnoyarsk Krai, Russia. It is the largest tributary of the Olenyok with a length of 503 kilometres (313 mi). Its drainage basin area is 47,700 square kilometres (18,400 mi^{2}). The river basin is a lonely, desolate area devoid of settlements.

The name of the river comes from the Yakut language "argaa/salaa" (Арҕаа/Салаа), meaning "western tributary".

== Course ==
The Arga-Sala is a left tributary of the Olenyok. Its sources are in the northeastern slopes of the Bukochan Range, Central Siberian Plateau, in the Evenkiysky District of Krasnoyarsk Krai. The river is formed at the confluence of the 47 km (29 mi) long Left Arga-Sala and 51 km (32 mi) long Right Arga-Sala. The Arga-Sala flows roughly eastwards with rapids and riffles in numerous stretches. It flows then across a floodplain with small lakes, changing direction with southeastward and northeastward bends, but still within a generally eastward trend. Finally it joins the left bank of the Olenyok river 20 km (12 mi) upstream of Olenyok village, Olenyoksky District, one of the few inhabited localities of the area. The Arga-Sala is frozen between October and May.

=== Tributaries ===
Its main tributaries are the 241 km (150 mi) long Kengeede (Кэнгээдэ), the 205 km (127 mi) long Kyuyonelekeen (Кюёнэлэкээн) and the 270 km (170 mi) long Kukusunda from the left, as well as the 94 km (58 mi) long Kyuyonelikeen (Кюёнэликээн) from the right.

== Flora and fauna ==
The river flows north of the Arctic Circle across a lightly-wooded taiga zone. The most common trees are larches.

Taimen, lenok, whitefish, grayling and pike are the main fish species found in the waters of the Arga-Sala.

== See also ==
- List of rivers of Russia
