= Anabar (river) =

Anabar Анабар / Анаабыр
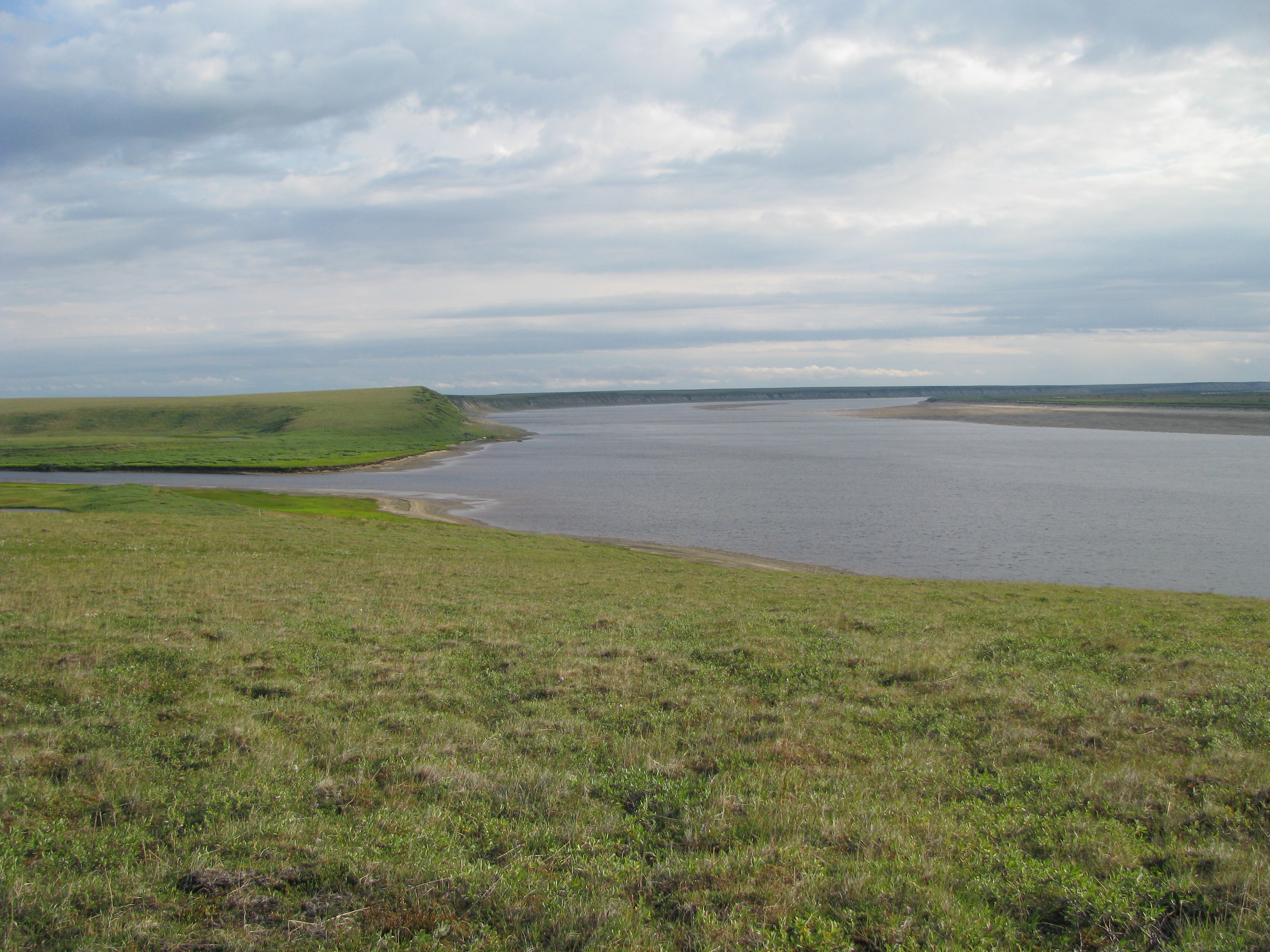
- The Anabar near the mouth of the Polovinnaya

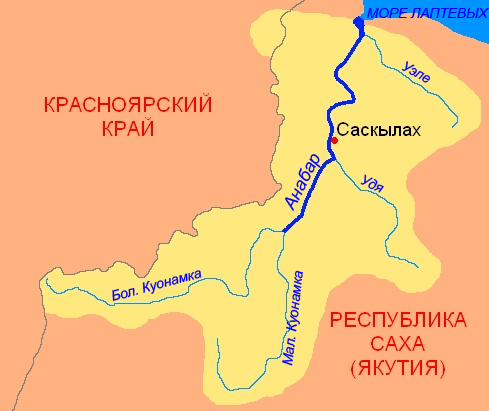
- Anabar river basin

- Location of the mouth Anabar (river) (Russia)

Location
- Country: Russia

Physical characteristics
- Source: Confluence of Malaya Kuonamka and Bolshaya Kuonamka
  - location: Olenyoksky District, Sakha
  - coordinates: 70°46′16″N 113°20′13″E
  - elevation: 16 m (52 ft)
- Mouth: Laptev Sea
  - location: Anabar Bay
  - coordinates: 73.2052°N 113.5567°E
  - elevation: 0 m (0 ft)
- Length: 380 km (240 mi) (939 km (583 mi))
- Basin size: 100,000 km^{2} (39,000 mi^{2})
- Discharge
  - average: 498 m^{3}/s (17,600 cu ft/s)

The Anabar (Russian: Анабар, romanized: Anabar, in its upper course: Большая Куонамка Bolshaya Kuonamka; Yakut: Анаабыр, romanized: Anaabır) is a river in Sakha, Russia. It is 380 kilometres (240 mi) long (939 km (583 mi) counting the 559 km (347 mi) long Bolshaya Kuonamka ("Big Kuonamka") stretch of its upper course) and has a drainage basin of 100,000 square kilometres (39,000 sq mi).

== Course ==
The Anabar is formed at the confluence of the Malaya Kuonamka and Bolshaya Kuonamka at the edge of the North Siberian Lowland. The length of the Anabar proper is 380 km (240 mi). The two rivers forming it have their sources in the northeastern part of the Anabar Plateau, part of the Central Siberian Plateau. There are many lakes in its basin.

The Anabar basin is located between rivers Khatanga and Olenyok. The mouth of the river is in the Anabar Bay. Its mean annual discharge is 564 cubic metres per second (19,900 cu ft/s), concentrated heavily in early summer when the ice that covers the river for most of the year thaws. The Uele river flows into the Laptev Sea close to the mouth of the Anabar, but it is not its tributary.

=== Tributaries ===
Its main tributaries are the 115 km (71 mi) long Mayat, the 342 km (213 mi) long Udya (Удьа), the 453 km (281 mi) long Malaya Kuonamka ("Little Kuonamka") and the 108 km (67 mi) long Ebelyakh on the right, as well as the 262 km (163 mi) long Suolama, the 139 km (86 mi) long Kharabyl and the 103 km (64 mi) long Konnies on the left.

== History ==
Historically Evenks have inhabited the basin of the Anabar River. Vasiliy Sychev was the first Russian to reach the river in 1643.

In present times the basin of the Anabar river is notable as the location of the largest concentration of diamond deposits in the world outside of Africa and Australia. These deposits made the Soviet Union into one of the world's largest producers of diamonds, and remain the economic mainstay of the area.

== See also ==
- List of rivers of Russia
