= Olenyoksky District =

Olenyoksky District Оленёкский улус (Russian)
- District

Other transcription(s)
  - Sakha: Өлөөн улууhа
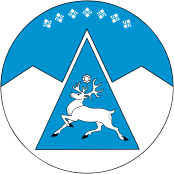
- Flag Coat of arms
- Location of Olenyoksky District in the Sakha Republic
- Coordinates: 68°30′15″N 112°26′50″E
- Country: Russia
- Federal subject: Sakha Republic
- Established: October 1, 1935
- Administrative center: Olenyok

Area
  - Total: 318,000 km^{2} (123,000 sq mi)

Population (2010 Census)
  - Total: 4,127
  - Density: 0.0130/km^{2} (0.0336/sq mi)
  - Urban: 0%
  - Rural: 100%

Administrative structure
  - Administrative divisions: 4 rural okrug
  - Inhabited localities: 4 rural localities

Municipal structure
  - Municipally incorporated as: Olenyoksky Municipal District
  - Municipal divisions: 0 urban settlements, 4 rural settlements
- Time zone: UTC+9 (MSK+6)
- OKTMO ID: 98642000
- Website: https://mr-olenekskij.sakha.gov.ru/

Olenyoksky District (Russian: Оленёкский улу́с; Yakut: Өлөөн улууһа, Ölöön uluuha, [øløːn uluːha]), or Olenyoksky-Evenki National District, is an administrative and municipal district (raion, or ulus), one of the thirty-four in the Sakha Republic, Russia. It is located in the west of the republic and borders with Anabarsky District in the north, Bulunsky and Zhigansky Districts in the east, Vilyuysky, Verkhnevilyuysky, and Nyurbinsky Districts in the southeast, Mirninsky District in the south and southwest, and with Evenkiysky District Krasnoyarsk Krai in the west and northwest. The area of the district is 318,000 square kilometers (123,000 sq mi). Its administrative center is the rural locality (a selo) of Olenyok. Population: 4,127 (2010 census); 4,091 (2002 Census); 3,993 (1989 Soviet census). The population of Olenyok accounts for 55.1% of the district's total population. With a population density of 0.013 people per square kilometer, Olenyoksky District is one of the most sparsely populated places in the world.

== Geography ==
The main rivers in the district are the Olenyok, with its tributaries Arga-Sala (with its tributaries Kengeede, Kukusunda. Kyuyonelikeen and Kyuyonelekeen), Alakit, Siligir, Merchimden, Ukukit, Birekte, Kuoyka and Beyenchime, as well as the Anabar. The largest lake is Lake Eyik, located at the southern end of the district.

Average January temperature ranges from −36 to −40 °C (−33 to −40 °F) and average July temperature ranges from +12 to +14 °C (54 to 57 °F).

== History ==
The district was established on October 1, 1935.

== Demographics ==
As of the 2021 Census, the ethnic composition was as follows:

- Evenks: 82.8%
- Yakuts: 14.0%
- Russians: 1.2%
- Evens: 0.5%
- other ethnicities: 1.5%
  Historical population
  Year	Pop.	±%
  1970	3,196	—
  1979	3,645	+14.0%
  1989	3,993	+9.5%
  2002	4,091	+2.5%
  2010	4,127	+0.9%
  2021	4,313	+4.5%
  Source: Census data

== Economy ==
The economy of the district is mostly based on agriculture. There are deposits of diamonds, natural gas, and construction materials.

== Inhabited localities ==
Municipal composition
Rural settlements	Population	Male	Female	Rural localities in jurisdiction*
Shologonsky National Nasleg (Шологонский национальный наслег)	344	178 (51.7%)	166 (48.3%)	**selo of Eyik**
Kirbeysky National Nasleg (Кирбейский национальный наслег)	846	433 (51.2%)	413 (48.8%)	**selo of Kharyyalakh**
Olenyoksky National Nasleg (Оленекский национальный наслег)	2,273	1,090 (48.0%)	1,183 (52.0%)	**selo of Olenyok** (administrative center of the district)
Zhilindinsky National Nasleg (Жилиндинский национальный наслег)	664	336 (50.6%)	328 (49.4%)	**selo of Zhilinda**

Divisional source:
Population source:
*Administrative centers are shown in bold
