= Olenyok (river) =

Olenyok Оленёк / Өлөөн
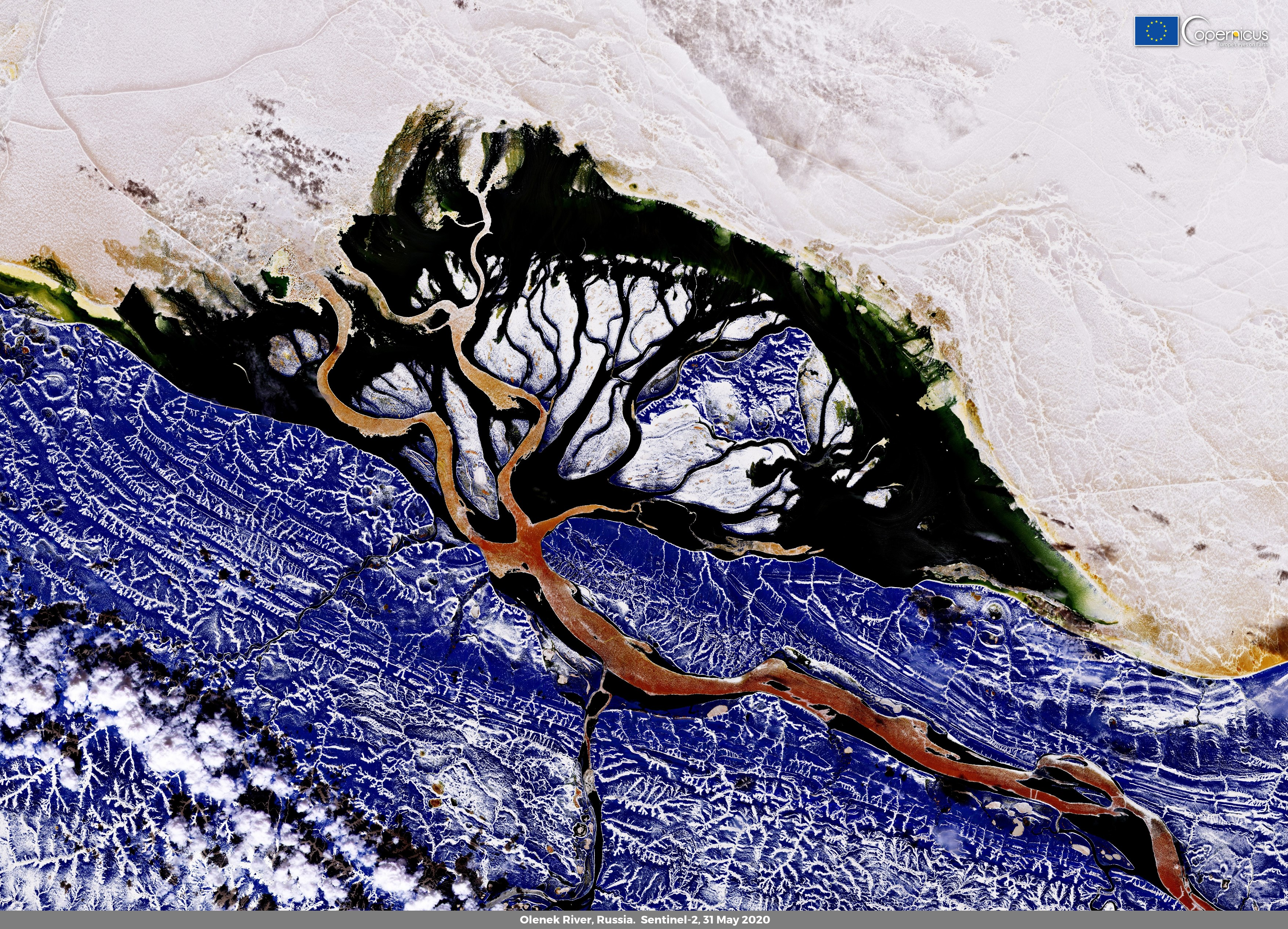
- Sentinel-2 picture of the Olenyok delta at the beginning of the spring thaw.

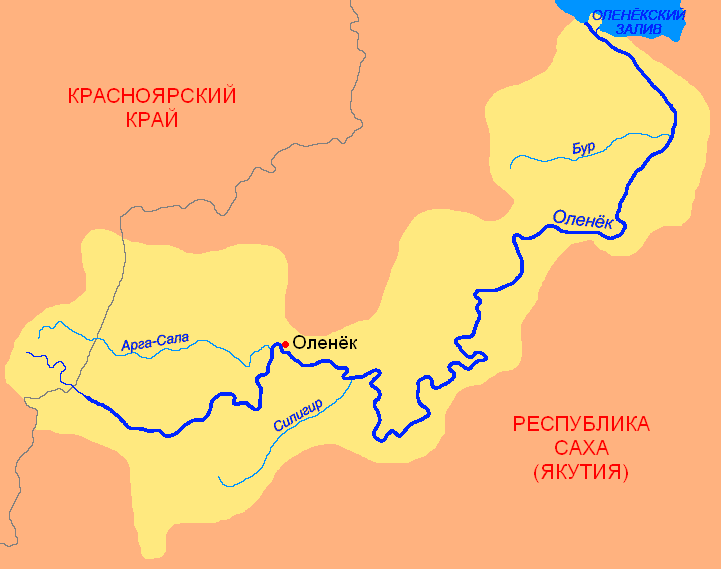
- Olenyok drainage basin

- Location of the mouth in Yakutia, Russia

Location
- Country: Russia
- Federal subject: Yakutia

Physical characteristics
- Source: Vilyuy Plateau
  - location: Evenkia, Yakutia
  - coordinates: 67°35′26″N 105°9′53″E
  - elevation: 460 m (1,510 ft)
- Mouth: Olenyok Gulf, Laptev Sea
  - location: Ust-Olenyok, Yakutia
  - coordinates: 72°59′1″N 119°47′40″E
  - elevation: 0 m (0 ft)
- Length: 2,292 km (1,424 mi)
- Basin size: 219,000 km^{2} (85,000 sq mi)
- Discharge
  - average: 1,210 cubic metres per second (43,000 cu ft/s)

The Olenyok (Russian: Оленёк, sometimes spelled Оленек, Olenek; Yakut: Өлөөн, Ölöön) is a major river in northern Siberian Russia, west of the lower Lena and east of the Anabar. It is 2,292 kilometres (1,424 mi) long, of which around 1,000 kilometres (620 mi) is navigable. Average water discharge is 1,210 cubic metres per second (43,000 cu ft/s).

The Olenyok is known for its abundance in fish. It is frozen for over eight months every year and the climate in its area is harsh because of the direct influence of the Arctic.

== History ==
In 1633 Ivan Rebrov reached the Olenyok from the Lena delta and built a fort. In 1642–44 Rebrov and Fedot Alekseyev Popov reached the river but were driven out by the natives.

Pioneering Russian Arctic explorer Vasili Pronchishchev and his wife Tatiana died of scurvy in the area of the river in September 1736, while mapping the coasts of the Laptev Sea. After their deaths, husband and wife were interred at Ust-Olenyok, near the mouth of the Olenyok. Their tomb was moved after the bodies were exhumed in 1999.

In 1956 the Olenekian Age of the Triassic Period of geological time was named for rock strata in the Olenyok area.

== Course ==
The river's source is in Krasnoyarsk Krai, on the Vilyuy Plateau, part of the Central Siberian Plateau. The river flows east and then north descending into the North Siberian Lowland. In its lower course it bends northwestwards skirting the western slopes of the Kystyk Plateau and the Chekanovsky Ridge before emptying into the Olenyok Gulf of the Laptev Sea. Its mouth is at Ust-Olenyok just west of the Lena River delta. Olenyok is a village located on the river bank.

=== Tributaries ===
The major tributaries of the Olenyok are the Arga-Sala (with its tributaries Kengeede, Kukusunda and Kyuyonelekeen), Bur, Ukukit, Birekte, Kuoika, Beyenchime and Buolkalakh on the left, and the Alakit, Siligir, Merchimden, Kyuyutingde (Кюютингдэ), Khorbusuonka and Kelimyar on the right.

=== Islands ===
Dyangylakh or Dzhyangylakh (Ostrov Dyangylakh) 73.089°N 120.140°E is a large flat delta island at the mouth of the Olenek River. There are many smaller islands in its immediate vicinity, such as Eppet Island off its eastern side, but none comes close to its size. Dyangylakh is 21 kilometres (13 mi) long and 16 kilometres (10 mi) wide.

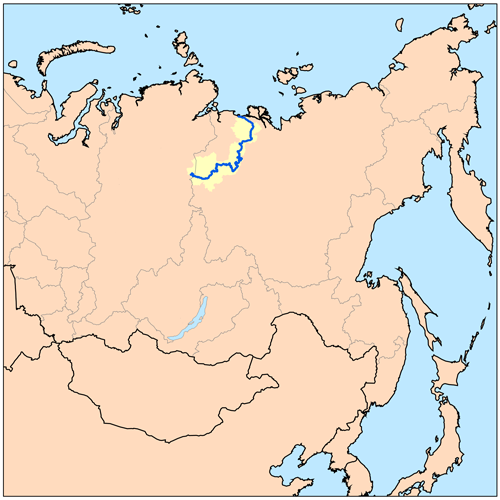
Location of the Olenyok River course

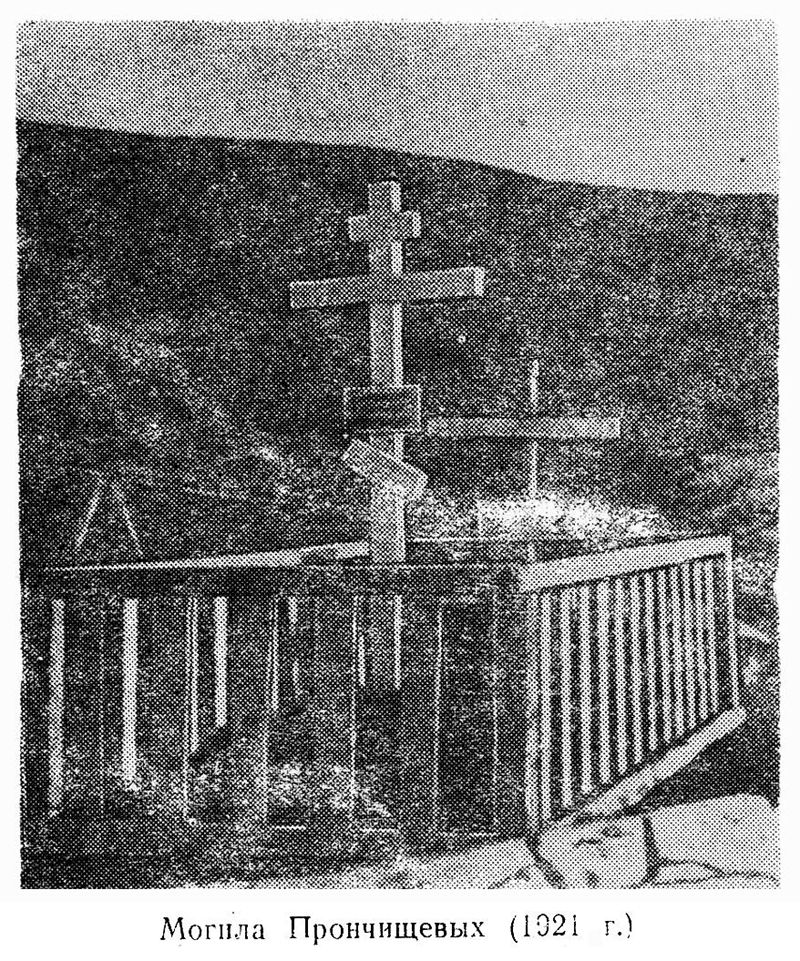
1921 image of the grave of Vasili and Tatiana Pronchishchev in Ust-Olenyok

== See also ==
- List of rivers of Russia
