= Olenyok (rural locality) =

Olenyok Оленёк
- Selo

Other transcription(s)
  - Sakha: Өлөөн
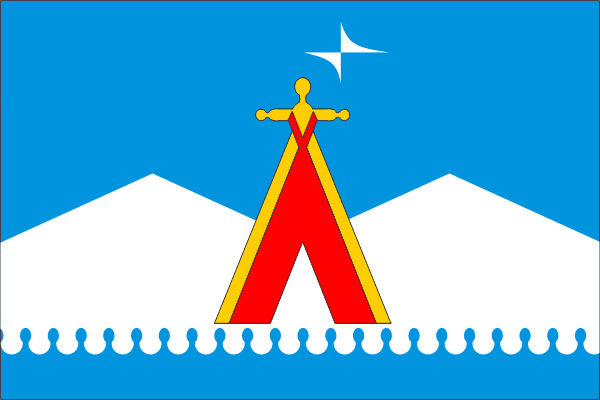
- Flag
- Interactive map of Olenyok
- Location of Olenyok Olenyok (Sakha Republic)
- Coordinates: 68°30′N 112°28′E
- Country: Russia
- Federal subject: Sakha Republic
- Administrative district: Olenyoksky District
- Rural okrugSelsoviet: Olenyoksky Rural Okrug
- Elevation: 258 m (846 ft)

Population (2010 Census)
  - Total: 2,273
  - Estimate (2021): 2,438 (+7.3%)

Administrative status
  - Capital of: Olenyoksky District, Olenyoksky Rural Okrug

Municipal status
  - Municipal district: Olenyoksky Municipal District
  - Rural settlement: Olenyoksky Rural Settlement
  - Capital of: Olenyoksky Municipal District, Olenyoksky Rural Settlement
- Time zone: UTC+
- Postal codes: 678480, 678489
- OKTMO ID: 98642437101

Olenyok (Russian: Оленёк; Yakut: Өлөөн, Ölöön) is a rural locality (a selo) and the administrative center of Olenyoksky District in the Sakha Republic, Russia, located north of the Arctic Circle. Population: 2,273 (2010 census); 2,228 (2002 census); 2,133 (1989 Soviet census).

== Geography ==
The village is located by the Olenyok River, a few miles downstream from the confluence of the Arga-Sala, its largest tributary.

== Transportation ==
Olenyok is served by the Olenyok Airport (IATA: ONK, ICAO: UERO).

== Climate ==
Olenyok has a subarctic climate (Köppen climate classification Dfc). Winters are extremely cold with average temperatures from −39.8 to −32.0 °C (−39.6 to −25.6 °F) in January, while summers are mild with average temperatures from +10.3 to +20.4 °C (50.5 to 68.7 °F). A temperature of −62.9 °C (−81.2 °F) was recorded in January 1959. Precipitation is quite low, but is somewhat higher in summer than at other times of the year. Temperatures in summer sometimes reach +30 °C (86 °F) and the record high is +35.7 °C (96.3 °F), recorded in July 1936.

Climate data for Olenyok
Month	Jan	Feb	Mar	Apr	May	Jun	Jul	Aug	Sep	Oct	Nov	Dec	Year
Record high °C (°F)	−3.7 (25.3)	−1.0 (30.2)	7.2 (45.0)	14.1 (57.4)	28.4 (83.1)	34.5 (94.1)	35.7 (96.3)	33.2 (91.8)	25.5 (77.9)	11.4 (52.5)	4.1 (39.4)	−0.2 (31.6)	35.7 (96.3)
Mean daily maximum °C (°F)	−31.6 (−24.9)	−28.8 (−19.8)	−16.0 (3.2)	−4.2 (24.4)	4.5 (40.1)	16.9 (62.4)	20.7 (69.3)	16.5 (61.7)	6.6 (43.9)	−7.3 (18.9)	−23.3 (−9.9)	−29.9 (−21.8)	−6.3 (20.6)
Daily mean °C (°F)	−35.2 (−31.4)	−32.6 (−26.7)	−21.4 (−6.5)	−9.7 (14.5)	−0.1 (31.8)	11.6 (52.9)	15.3 (59.5)	11.4 (52.5)	2.8 (37.0)	−10.4 (13.3)	−26.9 (−16.4)	−33.5 (−28.3)	−10.7 (12.7)
Mean daily minimum °C (°F)	−39.0 (−38.2)	−36.1 (−33.0)	−26.5 (−15.7)	−15.0 (5.0)	−4.2 (24.4)	7.0 (44.6)	10.6 (51.1)	7.0 (44.6)	−0.5 (31.1)	−13.4 (7.9)	−30.3 (−22.5)	−37.3 (−35.1)	−14.8 (5.4)
Record low °C (°F)	−62.9 (−81.2)	−59.6 (−75.3)	−55.6 (−68.1)	−46.4 (−51.5)	−28.9 (−20.0)	−15.1 (4.8)	−4.6 (23.7)	−9.9 (14.2)	−20.8 (−5.4)	−43.5 (−46.3)	−56.6 (−69.9)	−61.8 (−79.2)	−62.9 (−81.2)
Average precipitation mm (inches)	12.2 (0.48)	11.1 (0.44)	11.8 (0.46)	14.3 (0.56)	21.9 (0.86)	36.5 (1.44)	47.2 (1.86)	44.9 (1.77)	31.5 (1.24)	24.6 (0.97)	18.5 (0.73)	12.2 (0.48)	286.7 (11.29)
Average rainy days	0	0	0	1	7	17	16	18	12	1	0	0	72
Average snowy days	23	21	21	17	12	2	0	0	8	26	24	24	178
Average relative humidity (%)	79	79	74	65	64	60	63	72	78	83	81	79	73
Mean monthly sunshine hours	3	67	188	272	284	284	334	216	100	69	11	0	1,828
Source 1: pogoda.ru.net
Source 2: NOAA (sun only, 1961-1990)

Historical population
Year	Pop.	±%
1939	471	—
1959	749	+59.0%
1970	1,310	+74.9%
1979	1,811	+38.2%
1989	2,133	+17.8%
2002	2,228	+4.5%
2010	2,273	+2.0%
2021	2,438	+7.3%
Source: Census data
