= Tree line =

Edge of the habitat at which trees are capable of growing

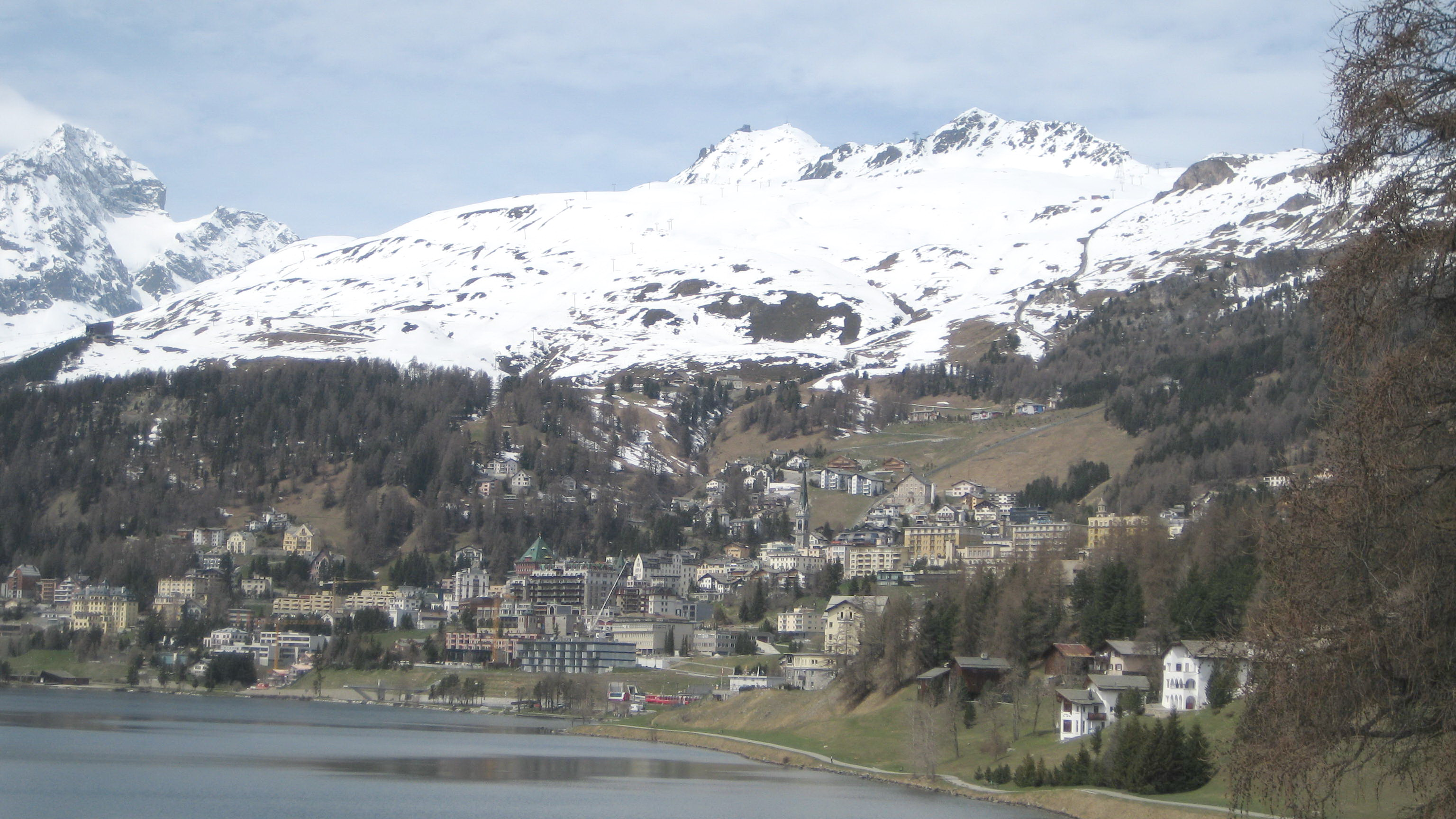
Tree line above St. Moritz, Switzerland. May 2009

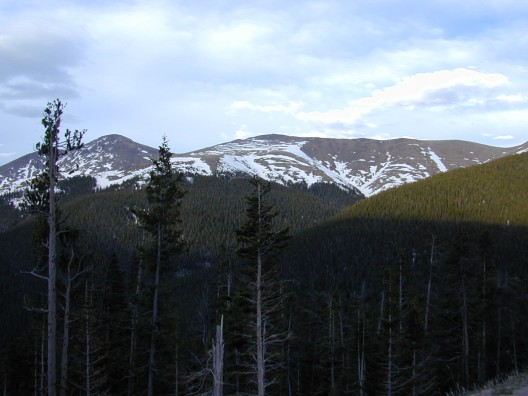
In this view of an alpine tree line, the distant line looks particularly sharp. The foreground shows the transition from trees to no trees. These trees are stunted in growth and one-sided because of cold and constant wind.

The tree line is the edge of a habitat at which trees can grow and beyond which they cannot. It is found at high elevations and high latitudes. Beyond the tree line, trees cannot tolerate the environmental conditions (usually low temperatures, extreme snowpack, or associated lack of available moisture). The tree line is sometimes distinguished from a lower timberline, which is the line below which trees form a forest with a closed canopy.

At the tree line, tree growth is often sparse, stunted, and deformed by wind and cold. This is sometimes known as krummholz (German for "crooked wood").

The tree line often appears well-defined, but it can be a more gradual transition. Trees grow shorter and often at lower densities as they approach the tree line, above which they are unable to grow at all. Given a certain latitude, the tree line is approximately 300 to 1000 meters in elevation below the permanent snow line and roughly parallel to it.

== Causes ==
Due to their vertical structure, trees are more susceptible to cold than more ground-hugging forms of plants. Summer warmth generally sets the limit to which tree growth can occur: while tree line conifers are very frost-hardy during most of the year, they become sensitive to just 1 or 2 degrees of frost in mid-summer. A series of warm summers in the 1940s seems to have permitted the establishment of "significant numbers" of spruce seedlings above the previous tree line in the hills near Fairbanks, Alaska. Survival depends on a sufficiency of new growth to support the tree. Wind can mechanically damage tree tissues directly, including blasting with windborne particles, and may also contribute to the desiccation of foliage, especially of shoots that project above the snow cover.

== Variation ==
The tree line elevation at a location is generally set by the mean temperature, while the realized tree line may be affected by disturbances, such as logging, or grazing. Most human activities cannot change the actual tree line, unless they affect the climate. The tree line follows the line where the seasonal mean temperature is approximately 6 °C or 43 °F. The seasonal mean temperature is taken over all days whose mean temperature is above 0.9 °C (33.6 °F). A growing season of 94 days above that temperature is required for tree growth.

Because of climate change, which leads to earlier snowmelt and favorable conditions for tree establishment, the tree line in North Cascades National Park has risen more than 400 feet (120 m) in 50 years.

Other local factors can locally change the elevation of tree line, such as aspect of slope, rain shadow. Tree lines on north-facing slopes in the northern hemisphere are lower than on south-facing slopes, because the increased shade on north-facing slopes means the snowpack takes longer to melt. This shortens the growing season for trees. In the southern hemisphere, the south-facing slopes have the shorter growing season. On coasts and isolated mountains, the tree line is often much lower than corresponding altitudes inland and in larger, more complex mountain systems. This is known as the Massenerhebung effect, and is caused by large mountain ranges retaining more heat and reducing wind velocity downwind, compared to isolated mountains. In addition, in some tropical or island localities, the lack of local drought- and cold-adapted species can result in lower tree lines than one might expect by climate alone.

== Types ==
This map of the "Distribution of Plants in a Perpendicular Direction in the Torrid, the Temperate, and the Frigid Zones" was first published 1848 in "The Physical Atlas". It shows tree lines of the Andes, Tenerife, Himalaya, Alps, Pyrenees, and Lapland.

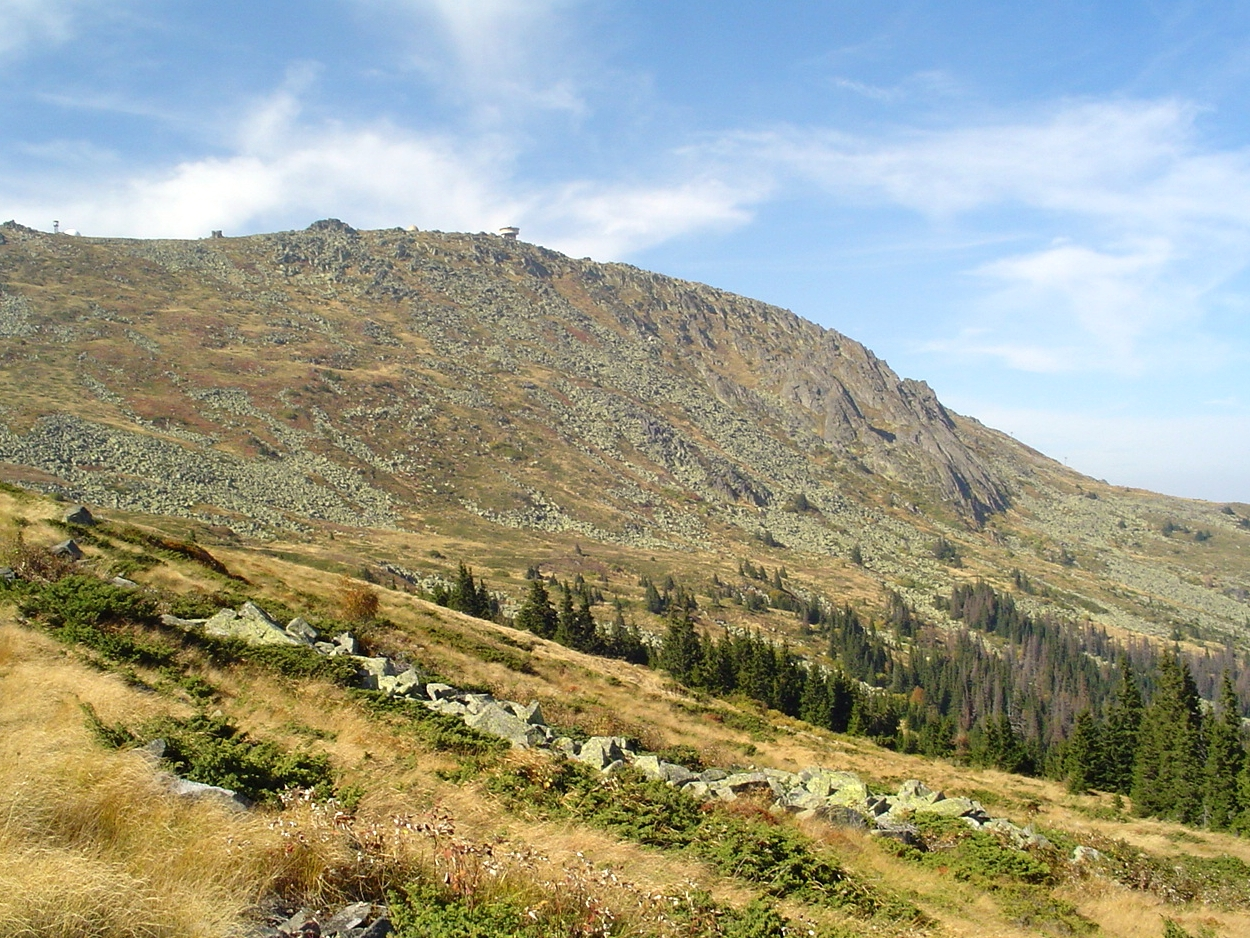
Alpine tree line of mountain pine and European spruce below the subalpine zone of Bistrishko Branishte, with the surmounting Golyam Rezen Peak, Vitosha Mountain, Sofia, Bulgaria

Several types of tree lines are defined in ecology and geography:

=== Alpine ===
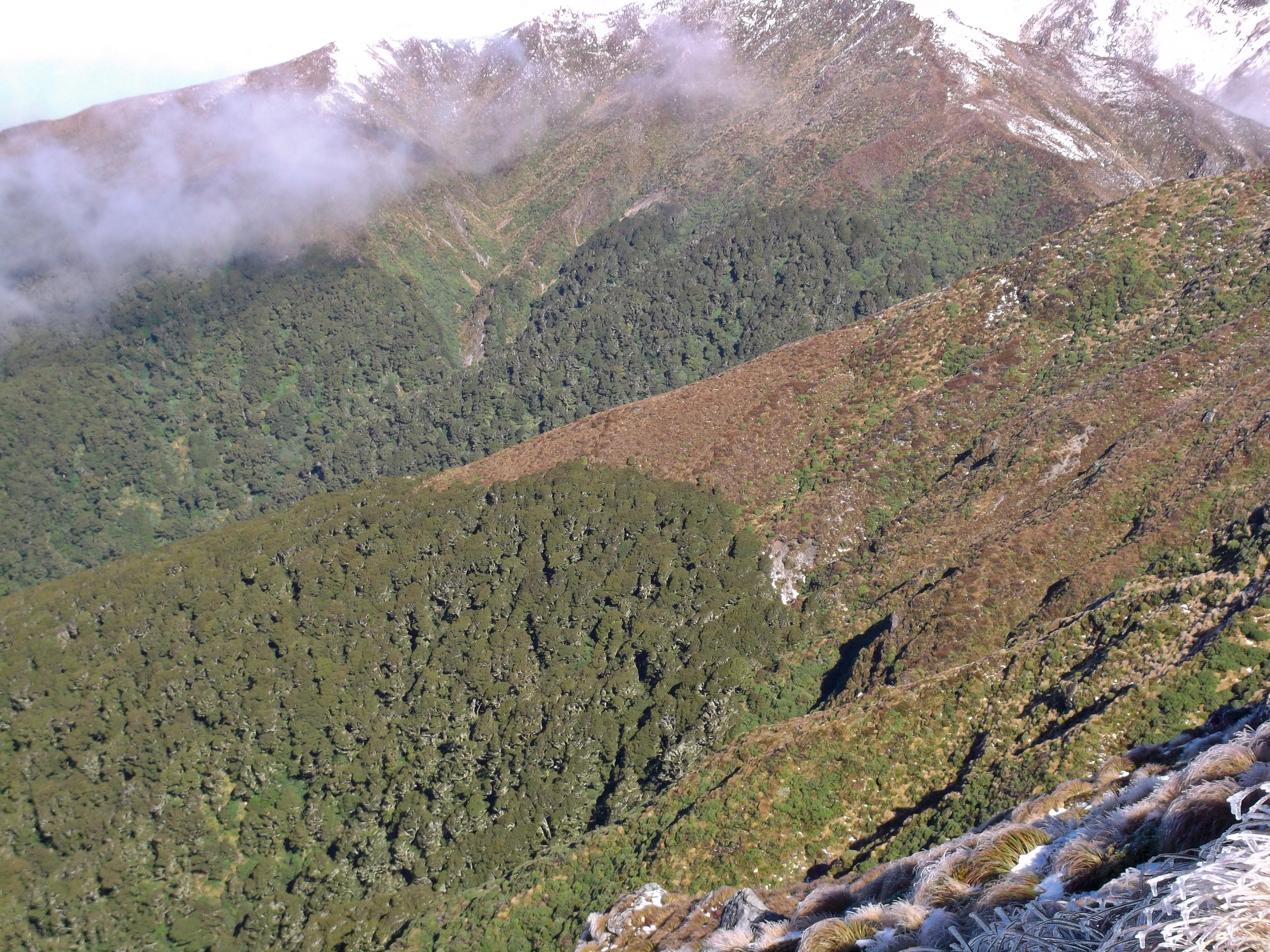
An alpine tree line in the Tararua Range

An alpine tree line is the highest elevation that sustains trees; higher up it is too cold, or the snow cover lasts for too much of the year, to sustain trees. The climate above the tree line of mountains is called an alpine climate, and the habitat can be described as the alpine zone.

The alpine tree line boundary is seldom abrupt: it usually forms a transition zone between closed forest below and treeless alpine zone above. This zone of transition occurs "near the top of the tallest peaks in the northeastern United States, high up on the giant volcanoes in central Mexico, and on mountains in each of the 11 western states and throughout much of Canada and Alaska". Environmentally dwarfed shrubs (krummholz) commonly form the upper limit.

The decrease in air temperature with increasing elevation creates the alpine climate. The rate of decrease can vary in different mountain chains, from 3.5 °F (1.9 °C) per 1,000 feet (300 m) of elevation gain in the dry mountains of the western United States, to 1.4 °F (0.78 °C) per 1,000 feet (300 m) in the moister mountains of the eastern United States. Skin effects and topography can create microclimates that alter the general cooling trend.

Compared with arctic tree lines, alpine tree lines may receive fewer than half of the number of degree days (above 10 °C (50 °F)) based on air temperature, but because solar radiation intensities are greater at alpine than at arctic tree lines the number of degree days calculated from leaf temperatures may be very similar.

At the alpine tree line, tree growth is inhibited when excessive snow lingers and shortens the growing season to the point where new growth would not have time to harden before the onset of fall frost. Moderate snowpack, however, may promote tree growth by insulating the trees from extreme cold during the winter, curtailing water loss, and prolonging a supply of moisture through the early part of the growing season. However, snow accumulation in sheltered gullies in the Selkirk Mountains of southeastern British Columbia causes the tree line to be 400 metres (1,300 ft) lower than on exposed intervening shoulders.

In some mountainous areas, higher elevations above the condensation line, or on equator-facing and leeward slopes, can result in low rainfall and increased exposure to solar radiation. This dries out the soil, resulting in a localized arid environment unsuitable for trees. Many south-facing ridges of the mountains of the Western U.S. have a lower tree line than the northern faces because of increased sun exposure and aridity. Hawaii's tree line of about 7,900–9,500 ft (2,400–2,900 m) is above a temperature inversion which blocks moisture from reaching the highest slopes.

=== Arctic ===
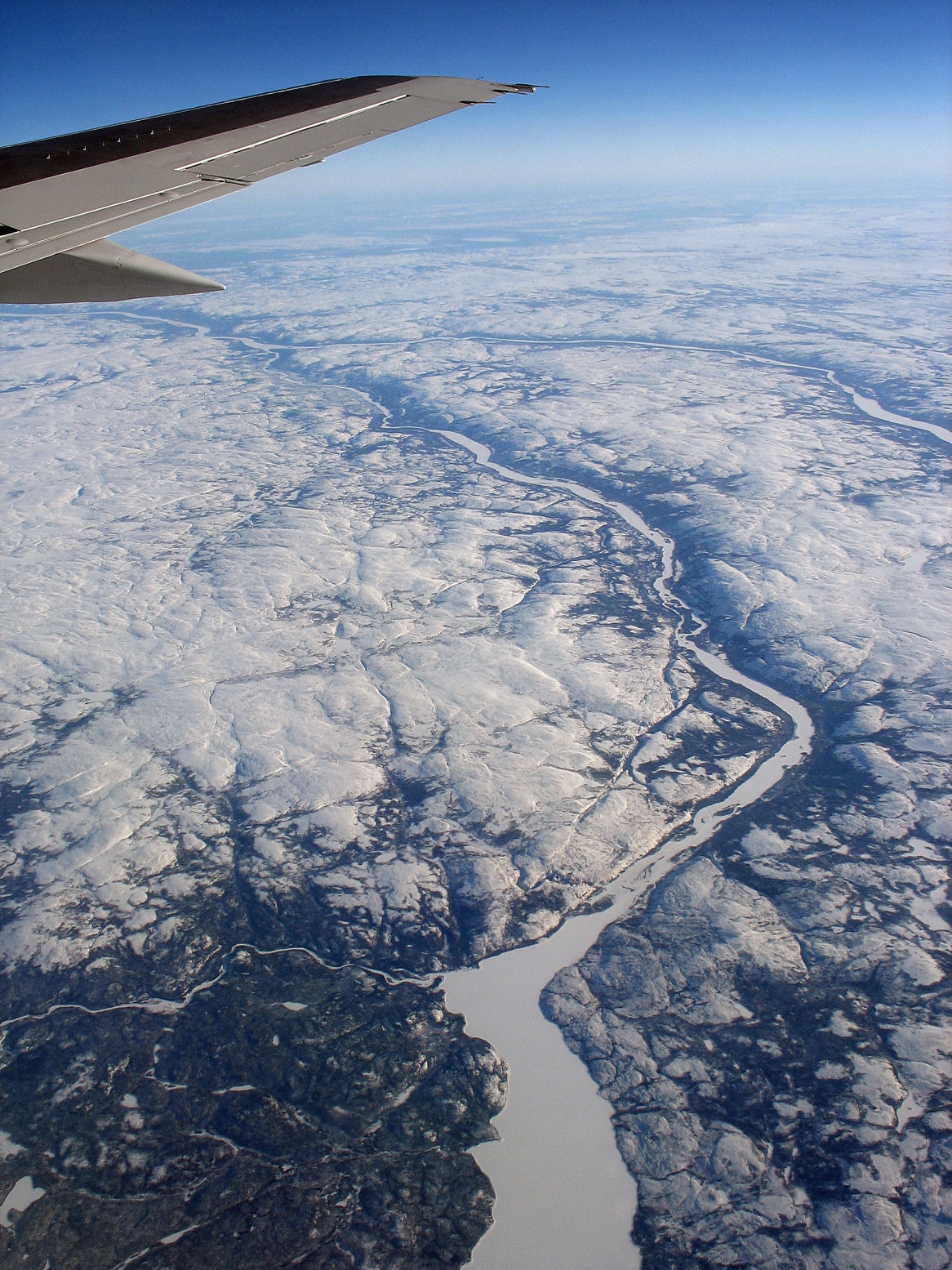
The tree line visible in the lower left, while trees also grow in the sheltered river valleys, northern Quebec, Canada

The Arctic tree line is the northernmost latitude in the Northern Hemisphere where trees can grow; farther north, it is too cold all year round to sustain trees. Extremely low temperatures, especially when prolonged, can freeze the internal sap of trees, killing them. In addition, permafrost in the soil can prevent trees from getting their roots deep enough for the necessary structural support.

Unlike alpine tree lines, the northern tree line occurs at low elevations. The Arctic forest-tundra transition zone in northwestern Canada varies in width, perhaps averaging 145 kilometres (90 mi) and widening markedly from west to east, in contrast with the telescoped alpine timberlines. North of the arctic tree line lies the low-growing tundra, and southwards lies the boreal forest.

Two zones can be distinguished in the Arctic tree line: a forest–tundra zone of scattered patches of krummholz or stunted trees, with larger trees along rivers and on sheltered sites set in a matrix of tundra; and "open boreal forest" or "lichen woodland", consisting of open groves of erect trees underlain by a carpet of Cladonia spp. lichens. The proportion of trees to lichen mat increases southwards towards the "forest line", where trees cover 50 percent or more of the landscape.

== Tree species near tree line ==
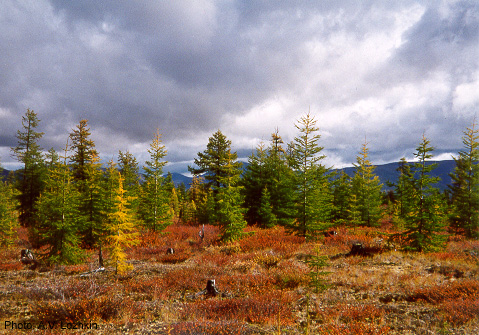
Dahurian larch growing close to the Arctic tree line in the Kolyma region, Arctic northeast Siberia

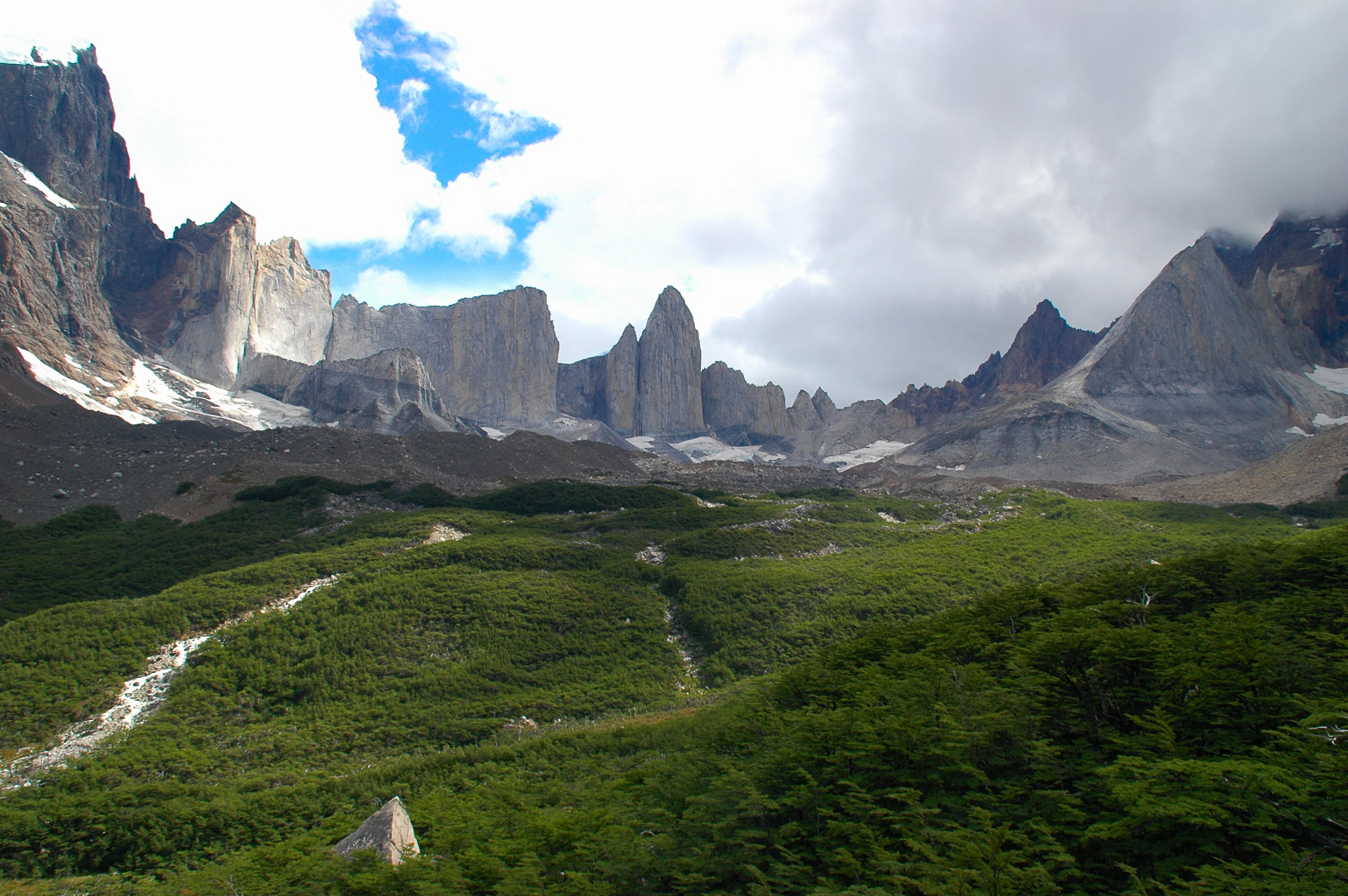
View of a Magellanic lenga forest close to the tree line in Torres del Paine National Park, Chile

Some typical Arctic and alpine tree line tree species (note the predominance of conifers):

=== Australia ===
- Snow gum (Eucalyptus pauciflora)

=== Eurasia ===
- Dahurian larch (Larix gmelinii)
- Macedonian pine (Pinus peuce)
- Swiss pine (Pinus cembra)
- Mountain pine (Pinus mugo)
- Arctic white birch (Betula pubescens subsp. tortuosa)
- Rowan (Sorbus aucuparia)

=== North America ===
- Subalpine fir (Abies lasiocarpa)
- Subalpine larch (Larix lyallii)
- Mountain hemlock (Tsuga mertensiana)
- Alaska yellow cedar (Chaemaecyparis nootkatensis)
- Engelmann spruce (Picea engelmannii)
- Whitebark pine (Pinus albicaulis)
- Great Basin bristlecone pine (Pinus longaeva)
- Rocky Mountains bristlecone pine (Pinus aristata)
- Foxtail pine (Pinus balfouriana)
- Limber pine (Pinus flexilis)
- Potosi pinyon (Pinus culminicola)
- Black spruce (Picea mariana)
- White spruce (Picea glauca)
- Tamarack (Larix laricina)
- Hartweg's pine (Pinus hartwegii)

=== South America ===
- Antarctic beech (Nothofagus antarctica)
- Lenga beech (Nothofagus pumilio)
- Alder (Alnus acuminata)
- Pino del cerro (Podocarpus parlatorei)
- Polylepis (Polylepis tarapacana)
- Eucalyptus (not native to South America but grown in large amounts in the high Andes).

== Worldwide distribution ==
=== Alpine tree lines ===
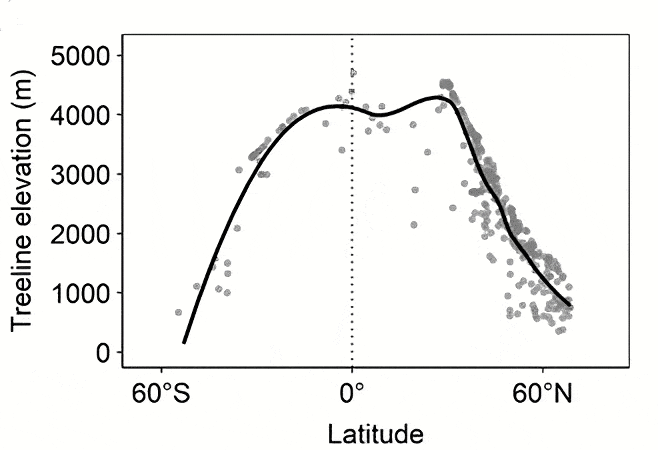
Tree line elevation by latitude

Averaging over many locations and local microclimates, the tree line rises 75 metres (245 ft) when moving 1 degree south from 70 to 50°N, and 130 metres (430 ft) per degree from 50 to 30°N. Between 30°N and 20°S, the tree line is roughly constant, between 3,500 and 4,000 metres (11,500 and 13,100 ft).

Here is a list of approximate tree lines from locations around the globe:

Location	Approx. latitude	Approx. elevation of tree line		Notes
Location	Approx. latitude	(m)	(ft)	Notes
Finnmarksvidda, Norway	69°N	500	1,600	At 71°N, near the coast, the tree-line is below sea level (Arctic tree line).
Abisko, Sweden	68°N	650	2,100	
Chugach Mountains, Alaska	61°N	700	2,300	Tree line around 1,500 feet (460 m) or lower in coastal areas
Southern Norway	61°N	1,100	3,600	Much lower near the coast, down to 500–600 metres (1,600–2,000 ft).
Scotland, United Kingdom	57°N	500	1,600	Strong maritime influence serves to cool summer and restrict tree growth
Northern Quebec	56°N	0	0	The cold Labrador Current originating in the arctic makes eastern Canada the sea-level region with the most southern tree-line in the northern hemisphere.
Southern Urals	55°N	1,100	3,600	
Canadian Rockies	51°N	2,400	7,900	
Tatra Mountains	49°N	1,600	5,200	
Olympic Mountains, Washington, United States	47°N	1,500	4,900	Heavy winter snowpack buries young trees until late summer
Swiss Alps	47°N	2,200	7,200	
Mount Katahdin, Maine, United States	46°N	1,150	3,800	
Eastern Alps, Austria, Italy	46°N	1,750	5,700	More exposure to cold Russian winds than Western Alps
Sikhote-Alin, Russia	46°N	1,600	5,200	
Alps of Piedmont, Northwestern Italy	45°N	2,100	6,900	
New Hampshire, United States	44°N	1,350	4,400	Some peaks have even lower tree lines because of fire and subsequent loss of soil, such as Grand Monadnock and Mount Chocorua.
Wyoming, United States	43°N	3,000	9,800	
Caucasus Mountains	42°N	2,400	7,900	
Rila and Pirin Mountains, Bulgaria	42°N	2,300	7,500	Up to 2,600 m (8,500 ft) on favorable locations. Mountain Pine is the most common tree line species.
Pyrenees Spain, France, Andorra	42°N	2,300	7,500	Mountain Pine is the tree line species
Steens Mountain, Oregon, US	42°N	2,500	8,200	
Wasatch Mountains, Utah, United States	40°N	2,900	9,500	Higher (nearly 11,000 feet or 3,400 metres in the Uintas)
Rocky Mountain NP, CO, United States	40°N	3,550	11,600	On warm southwest slopes
Rocky Mountain NP, CO, United States	40°N	3,250	10,700	On northeast slopes
Yosemite, CA, United States	38°N	3,200	10,500	West side of Sierra Nevada
Yosemite, CA, United States	38°N	3,600	11,800	East side of Sierra Nevada
Sierra Nevada, Spain	37°N	2,400	7,900	Precipitation low in summer
Japanese Alps	36°N	2,900	9,500	
Khumbu, Himalaya	28°N	4,200	13,800	
Yushan, Taiwan	23°N	3,600	11,800	Strong winds and poor soil restrict further grow of trees.
Hawaii, United States	20°N	3,000	9,800	Geographic isolation and no local tree species with high tolerance to cold temperatures.
Pico de Orizaba, Mexico	19°N	4,000	13,100	
Costa Rica	9.5°N	3,400	11,200	
Mount Kinabalu, Borneo	6.1°N	3,400	11,200	
Mount Kilimanjaro, Tanzania	3°S	3,100	10,200	Upper limit of forest trees; woody ericaeous scrub grows up to 3900m
New Guinea	6°S	3,850	12,600	
Andes, Peru	11°S	3,900	12,800	East side; on west side tree growth is restricted by dryness
Andes, Bolivia	18°S	5,200	17,100	Western Cordillera; highest tree line in the world on the slopes of Sajama Volcano (Polylepis tarapacana)
Andes, Bolivia	18°S	4,100	13,500	Eastern Cordillera; tree line is lower because of lower solar radiation (more humid climate)
Sierra de Córdoba, Argentina	31°S	2,000	6,600	Precipitation low above trade winds, also high exposure
Australian Alps, New South Wales, Australia	36°S			
Australian Alps, New South Wales, Australia	36°S	1,800	5,900	Despite the far inland location, summers are cool relative to the latitude, with occasional summer snow; and heavy springtime snowfalls are common.
Andes, Laguna del Laja, Chile	37°S	1,600	5,200	Temperature rather than precipitation restricts tree growth
Mount Taranaki, North Island, New Zealand	39°S	1,500	4,900	Strong maritime influence serves to cool summer and restrict tree growth
Northeast Tasmania, Australia	41°S	1,200	3,900	Although sheltered on the leeward side of the island, summers are still cool for the latitude.
Southwest Tasmania, Australia	43°S	750	2,500	Exposed to the westerly storm track, summer is extraordinarily cool for the latitude, with frequent summer snow. Springtime receives an extreme amount of cold, heavy precipitation; winds are likewise extreme.
Fiordland, South Island, New Zealand	45°S	950	3,100	Very snowy springs, strong cold winds and cool summers with frequent summer snow restrict tree growth
Lago Argentino, Argentina	50°S	1,000	3,300	Nothofagus pumilio
Torres del Paine, Chile	51°S	950	3,100	Strong influence from the Southern Patagonian Ice Field serves to cool summer and restrict tree growth
Navarino Island, Chile	55°S	600	2,000	Strong maritime influence serves to cool summer and restrict tree growth

=== Arctic tree lines ===
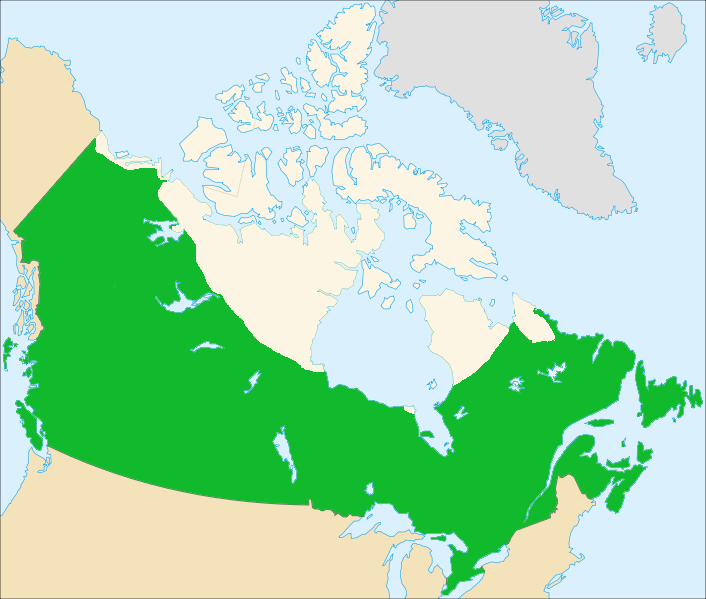
Map of tree line in Canada

Like the alpine tree lines shown above, polar tree lines are heavily influenced by local variables such as aspect of slope and degree of shelter. In addition, permafrost has a major impact on the ability of trees to place roots into the ground. When roots are too shallow, trees are susceptible to windthrow and erosion. Trees can often grow in river valleys at latitudes where they could not grow on a more exposed site. Maritime influences such as ocean currents also play a major role in determining how far from the equator trees can grow as well as the warm summers experienced in extreme continental climates. In northern inland Scandinavia, there is substantial maritime influence on high parallels that keep winters relatively mild, but with enough inland effect to have summers well above the threshold for the tree line. Here are some typical polar tree lines:

Location	Approx. longitude	Approx. latitude of tree line	Notes
Norway	24°E	70°N	The North Atlantic current makes Arctic climates in this region warmer than other coastal locations at comparable latitude. In particular the mildness of winters prevents permafrost.
West Siberian Plain	75°E	68°N	Reaches north of the Arctic Circle because of the continental nature of the climate and warmer summer temperatures.
Central Siberian Plateau	102°E	73°N	Extreme continental climate means the summer is warm enough to allow tree growth at higher latitudes, extending to northernmost forests of the world at 72°28'N at Ary-Mas (102° 15' E) in the Novaya River valley, a tributary of the Khatanga River and the more northern Lukunsky grove at 72°31'N, 105° 03' E east from Khatanga River.
Russian Far East (Kamchatka and Chukotka)	160°E	60°N	The Oyashio Current and strong winds affect summer temperatures to prevent tree growth. The Aleutian Islands are almost completely treeless.
Alaska, United States	152°W	68°N	Trees grow north to the south-facing slopes of the Brooks Range. The mountains block cold air coming off of the Arctic Ocean.
Northwest Territories, Canada	132°W	69°N	Reaches north of the Arctic Circle because of the continental nature of the climate and warmer summer temperatures.
Nunavut	95°W	61°N	Influence of the very cold Hudson Bay moves the tree line southwards.
Labrador Peninsula	72°W	56°N	Very strong influence of the Labrador Current on summer temperatures as well as altitude effects (much of Labrador is a plateau). In parts of Labrador, the tree line extends as far south as 53°N. Along the coast the northernmost trees are at 58°N in Napartok Bay.
Greenland	50°W	69°N	Determined by experimental tree planting in the absence of native trees because of isolation from natural seed sources; few trees are surviving and growing slowly at Søndre Strømfjord (67°N). There is one natural forest in the Qinngua Valley.

=== Antarctic tree lines ===
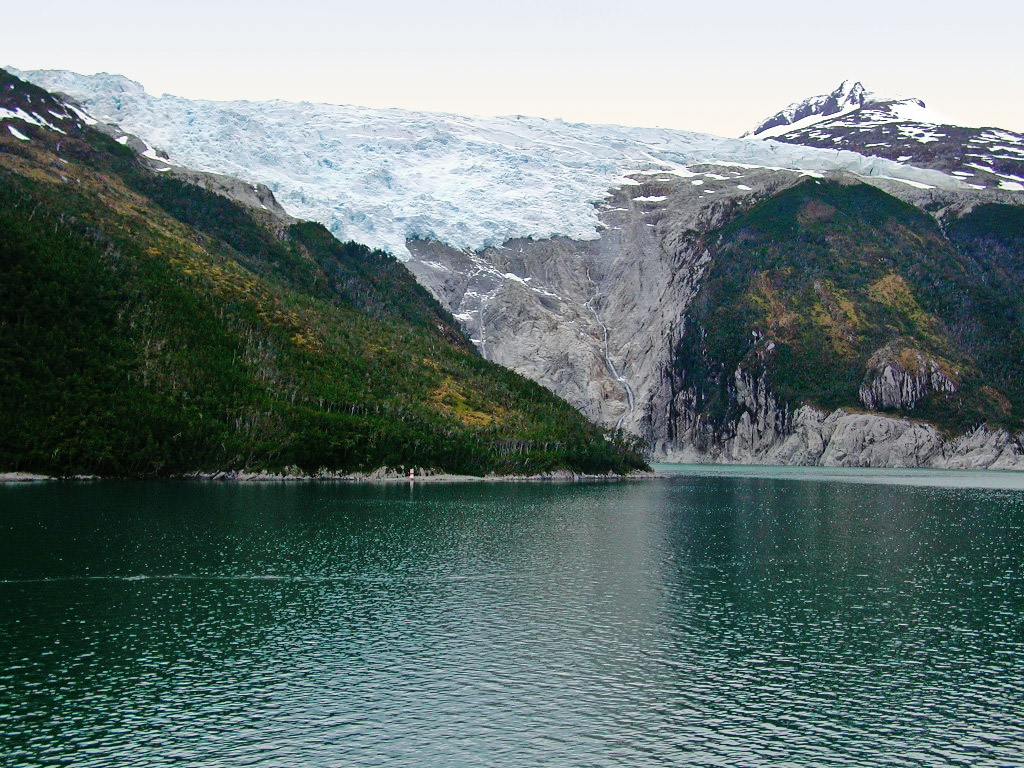
Trees growing along the north shore of the Beagle Channel, 55°S.

The southernmost trees in the world are on Isla Hornos (56°S), at the southern tip of South America. Trees do not exist on subantarctic islands nor in Antarctica. Therefore, there is no continental Antarctic tree line: the Southern Ocean acts as a tree boundary.

The subantarctic islands (South Georgia, Prince Edward, Crozet, Kerguelen, Heard and McDonald, and Macquarie Islands) lie in the Antarctic Circumpolar Current between 46.4° and 54.6°S. While the climate of these islands is cold and wet with long growing seasons, none of these islands have trees, due to the strong winds of the Roaring Forties and Furious Fifties.

Southern Rata forests exist on Enderby Island and Auckland Islands (both 50°S) and these grow up to an elevation of 370 metres (1,200 ft) in sheltered valleys. These trees seldom grow above 3 m (9.8 ft) in height and they get smaller as one gains altitude, so that by 180 m (600 ft) they are waist-high. These islands have only between 600 and 800 hours of sun annually. Campbell Island (52°S) further south is treeless, except for one stunted spruce, probably planted in 1907. The climate on these islands is not severe, but tree growth is limited by almost continual rain and wind. The summers are very cold, with an average January temperature of 9 °C (48 °F), while winters are a mild 5 °C (41 °F) but wet.

== See also ==
- Montane ecosystems
- Ecotone: a transition between two adjacent ecological communities
- Edge effects: the effect of contrasting environments on an ecosystem
- Massenerhebung effect
- Snow line
