= Paradoxosisyra =

Paradoxosisyra Temporal range: Early Cenomanian

Scientific classification
- Kingdom: Animalia
- Phylum: Arthropoda
- Class: Insecta
- Order: Neuroptera
- Family: Sisyridae
- Genus: †Paradoxosisyra; Makarkin, 2016
- Species: †P. groehni

Binomial name
- †Paradoxosisyra groehni Makarkin, 2016

Extinct genus of lacewing

Paradoxosisyra is an extinct genus of lacewing in the spongefly family, Sisyridae. The genus contains a single species, Paradoxosisyra groehni and is placed into the extinct subfamily Paradoxosisyrinae. Paradoxosisyra is known from a solitary Middle Cretaceous fossil which was found in Asia.

== History and classification ==
Paradoxosisyra is known from one adult fossil, the holotype, specimen number "GPIH Typ. Kat. Nr. 4580". At the time of the genus description, the specimen was residing in the Geological-Paleontological Institute and Museum's C. Gröhn collection, part of the University of Hamburg. The described specimen is an adult female which has been preserved as an inclusion in a transparent chunk of Burmese amber. The amber specimens were recovered from deposits in Kachin State, in Myanmar. Burmese amber has been radiometrically dated using U-Pb isotopes, yielding an age of approximately 98.79 ± 0.62 million years old, close to the Aptian – Cenomanian boundary, in the earliest Cenomanian.

The fossil was first described by the Russian paleoentomologist Vladimir Makarkin of the Far East Branch of the Russian Academy of Sciences. Makarkin's 2016 type description of the new genus and species was published in the journal Cretaceous Research. The genus name Paradoxosisyra was coined as a combination of the modern genus name Sisyra and the Greek word "paradoxos" meaning strange, in allusion to the unique mouth-parts not seen in any other member of the family. The specific epithet groehni was coined as a patronym honoring the amber collector Carsten Gröhn who collected and promoted the study of Baltic amber.

Paradoxosisyra is one of three Sisyridae genera described from the fossil record, the others being the Cretaceous Prosisyrina from Taimyr amber and the Eocene Paleosisyra from Baltic amber. Due to the different structure of the mouthparts from other members of Sisyridae, Makarkin erected a new subfamily Paradoxosisyrinae for the genus, placing the other genera into the subfamily Sisyrinae.

== Description ==
While the placement and structure of the gonocoxites on the females abdomen and the general wing venation are most similar to genera of Sisyridae, a number of characters distinguish Pa. groehni. Most notably the mouthparts are fused and modified into an extremely elongated siphon-like tube. All the other described genera in Sisyridae have adults with mandible structured mouthparts used for chewing or biting. There are several raised dome like calluses that are covered in setae and unlike other member of Sisyridae, the pronotum sclerite is present.
