= Prosisyrina =

Prosisyrina Temporal range: Santonian

Scientific classification
- Domain: Eukaryota
- Kingdom: Animalia
- Phylum: Arthropoda
- Class: Insecta
- Order: Neuroptera
- Family: Sisyridae
- Subfamily: Sisyrinae
- Genus: †Prosisyrina; Perkovsky & Makarkin, 2015

Species
- P. sphinga; P. sukachevae

Extinct genus of lacewings

Prosisyrina is an extinct genus of lacewing in the neuropteran family Sisyridae. The genus contains two described species, Prosisyrina sphinga and Prosisyrina sukachevae. Prosisyrina is known from a group of Late Cretaceous fossils which were found in Asia.

== History and classification ==
The two extinct species of Prosisyrina have been identified from adults that are preserved as inclusions in Taimyr amber. The fossils of both species were collected in a 2012 expedition to the Taimyr peninsula. The ambers of the peninsula occur in the upper levels of the Kheta Formation, which is exposed in a number of locations in the Taimyr region. Age estimates of the Kheta Formation are between the Coniacian and Santonian, and the ambers are found consistently in the upper most units, giving a Santonian age range for the inclusions. The Prosisyrina adults were collected from the Yantardakh locality, which is approximately 3 km (1.9 mi) upstream from the confluence of the Maimecha River with the Kheta River, on the bank of the Maimecha. Based on the flora and fauna of the Ledyanaya and Mutino Formations which surround the Kheta formation, the paleoforest likely has a humid and warm temperate climate with the tees growing along river banks. While the resin producing trees have not been identified, the resins were likely dropped into the river systems and buried quickly in deltaic sediments.

At the time of the description, the holotype specimens of both species, number PIN 3311/2145 and PIN 3311/2525 plus an additional specimen were preserved in the A. A. Borissiak Paleontological Institute collections, part of the Russian Academy of Sciences. The fossils were first described by the European paleoentomologists Evgeny Perkovsky and Vladimir Makarkin. In the type description, Perkovsky and Makarkin named the genus Prosisyrina and the type species Prosisyrina sukachevae, with the genus name derived from the modern genus name Sisyrina and the Greek prefix "pro-" meaning before. The combination was chosen in allusion to the similarity between the two genera. The specific epithet sukachevae was coined as a matronym honoring the amber researcher Irina D. Sukacheva who has studied Taimyr amber.

The second species of Prosisyrina was studied and described by Makarkin and Perkovsky in a 2016 paper. The second species was named "sphinga", based on the Latin word for Sphinx, as an allusion to the problem placing the species in a genus.

== Description ==
In Prosisyrina the maxillary palps have a distinct spindle shape that narrows at the palps base, while in species of Paleosisyra, Sisyra, and Sisyrina the palps widen at towards the base. The hindwings have a unique character suite including a uniform midsection of the costal space, which is only also seen in Paleosysyra. In the other genera the costal space midpoint has a distinct narrowing.

=== P. sukachevae ===
The only specimen described of P. sukachevae is of a very partial adult. The nearly complete to complete parts include the labial and maxillary palpus, one hindwing, the mid legs, right foreleg, and right hindleg. Seven segments of the left antennae, and a fragment of a forewing are also present. The head was preserved only as a cast in the amber, allowing for little detail to be seen. The hindwing has an estimated length of 2.5 mm (0.098 in) and at its widest is about 1.1 mm (0.043 in). There are a series of trichosor setae preserved along the entire margin, with the basal section of the costal region.

=== P. sphinga ===
As with the P. sukachevae holotype, the only fossil of P. sphinga described is notably incomplete. The forewings, upper surfaces of the thorax and head are all exposed on the amber surface, leaving only poor details as impressions. Portions of the hindwings and the antennae are preserved in the amber but badly preserved or obscured, and the legs are fully intact. The labial palps are missing, but the maxillary palps are partially preserved. The fossil shows a grouping of nine gonocoxites on the underside of the abdomen indicating it was a male, and the tip has a pair of large setae. Based on the structure of the maxillary palps the species was placed with reservation in Prosisyrina. The holotype of P. sukachevae is missing the rear segments of the abdomen, so it is possible P. sphinga may belong to a separate genus. The vein structure of the hindwing is different in the placement of one of the RP vein branches, with one of the branches originating on the apical side of the 2ra-rp vein branch, while all of the branches split on the basal side in P. sukachevae.
