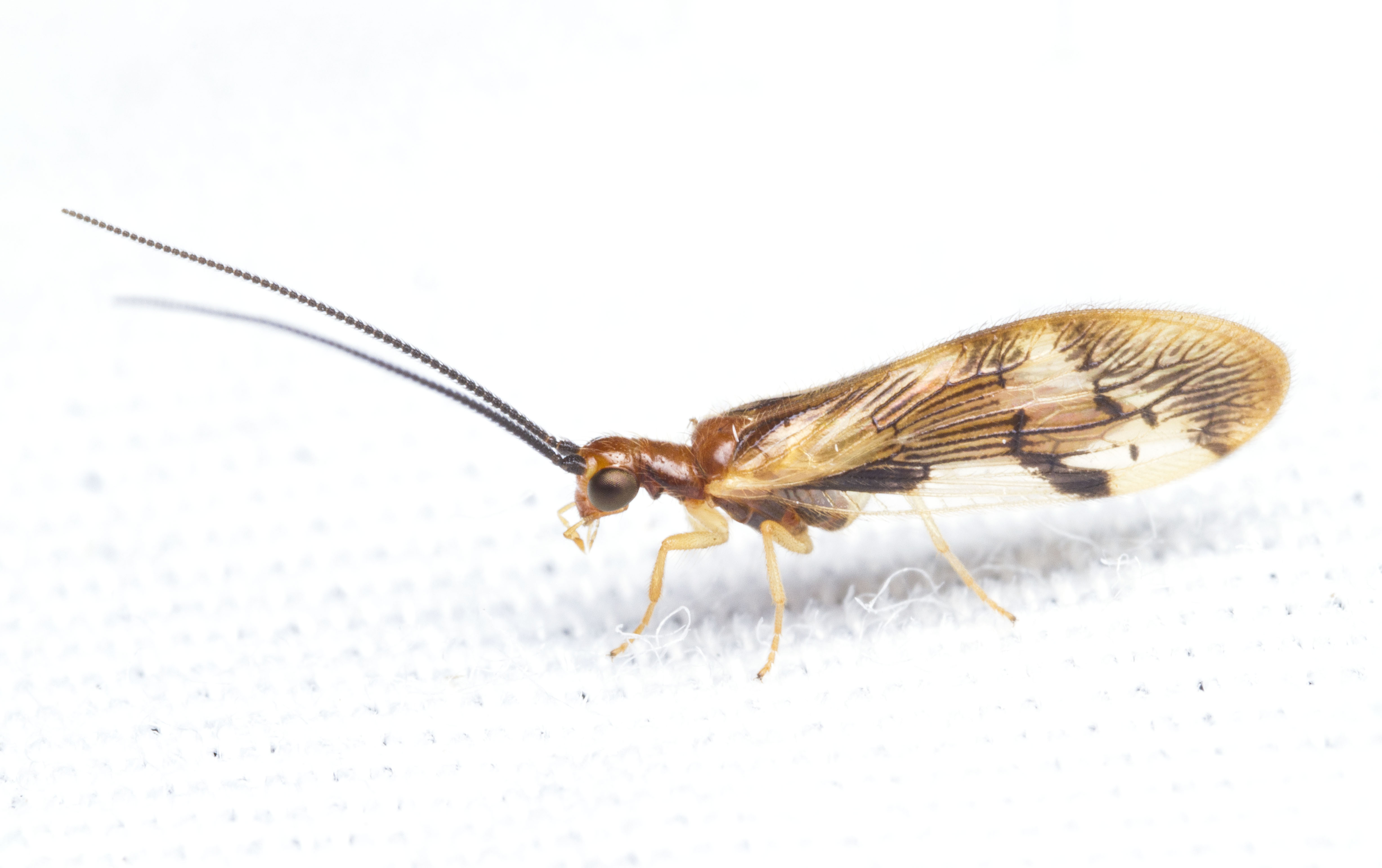

Scientific classification
- Domain: Eukaryota
- Kingdom: Animalia
- Phylum: Arthropoda
- Class: Insecta
- Order: Neuroptera
- Family: Sisyridae
- Genus: Climacia
- Species: C. areolaris

Binomial name
- Climacia areolaris (Hagen, 1861)

Synonyms
- Climacia dictyona Needham in Needham and Betten, 1901

= Climacia areolaris =

Species of insect

Climacia areolaris is a species of spongillafly in the family Sisyridae. It is found in Canada, United States, and Mexico.

== Taxonomy and identification ==
C. areolaris is a small species of spongillafly, with adults a little over 3mm from head to wingtips, and third instar larvae about 3.7–4.3mm in length, jaws exclusive. Both adults and larvae have been described.

Two other species of Climacia are present in the US, which can be distinguished by wing patterns among other features. Both an adult and larval key to the three species exists.

== Geographic distribution ==
C. areolaris is distributed from its northernmost limit in Quebec and Nova Scotia south through the eastern United States. Its westernmost limit is New Mexico, and it extends south into Florida as well as the Mexican states of Tamaulipas and San Luis Potosí.

== Habitat ==
Larvae are found in freshwater streams, ponds, and lakes where suitable populations of their host sponges reside. Adults are terrestrial and can fly.

== Biology ==
=== Life history ===
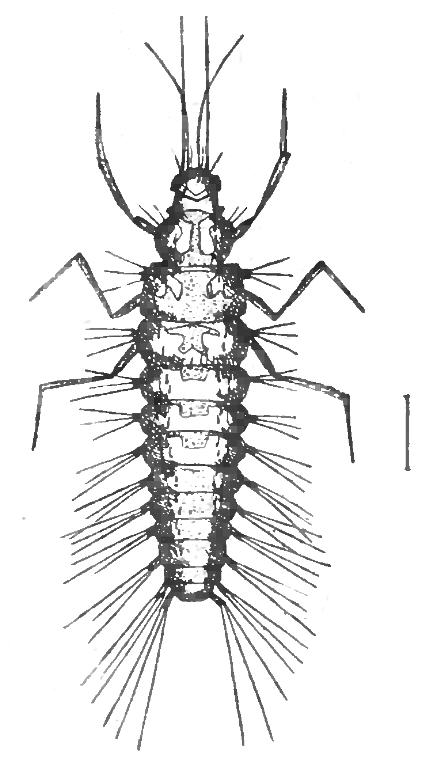
Larva of the related genus Sisyra, showing specialized sucking mouthparts.

Eggs are laid on objects near or overhanging water. Larvae feed on freshwater sponges, with 6 species of hosts being recorded: Spongilla fragilis, Spongilla lacustris, Meyenia subdivisa, Heteromeyenia ryderi, Trochospongilla horrida, and T. leidyi. Larvae have long stylet-like mouthparts in the form of the mandible-maxillary complex like other Neuroptera. These mouthparts are used to pierce the freshwater sponges and feed on them. Third instar larvae exit the water and spin intricate nets over themselves before spinning cocoons, pupating up to 50 feet from shore.

Adult C. areolaris feed on pollen and are attracted to lights. They are active from March to December.

=== Parasitism by other species ===
C. areolaris is parasitized by the pteromalid wasp Sisyridivora cavigena. S. cavigena parasitizes both the pupal stage and last instar larvae in the process of pupation.

=== Genetics ===
The Y chromosome is present in other representatives of Sisyridae but has been evolutionarily lost in males of C. areolaris. The cytology has been described by Hughes-Schrader.

== See also ==
- Sisyridae
