= Climacia californica =

Scientific classification
- Domain: Eukaryota
- Kingdom: Animalia
- Phylum: Arthropoda
- Class: Insecta
- Order: Neuroptera
- Family: Sisyridae
- Genus: Climacia
- Species: C. californica

Binomial name
- Climacia californica Chandler, 1953

Species of fly

Climacia californica is a species of spongillafly in the family Sisyridae. It is found in Central America and North America.
