= Anabar Plateau =

Mountain range in Siberia, Russia

- Анабарское плато
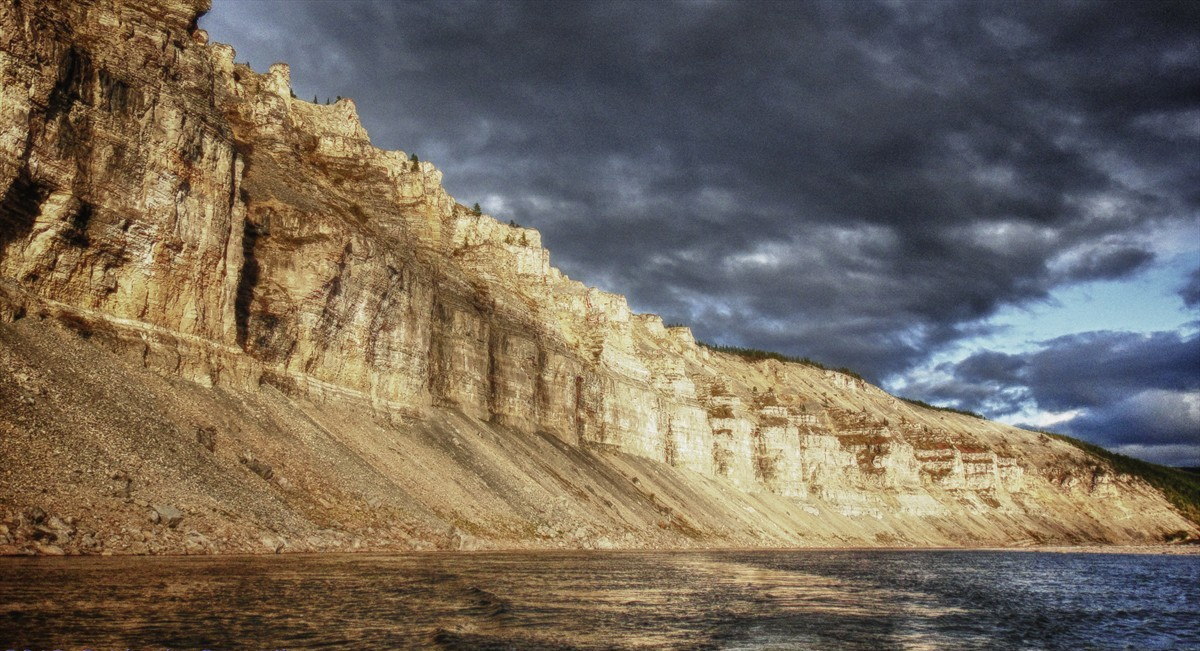
- Cliffs by the Kotuykan River, Anabar Plateau

Highest point
- Peak: unnamed
- Elevation: 905 m (2,969 ft)

Dimensions
- Length: 550 km (340 mi)
- Width: 370 km (230 mi)

Geography
- Location within Krasnoyarsk Krai
- Country: Russia
- Federal subject: Krasnoyarsk Krai and Sakha Republic
- Range coordinates: 70°30′N 108°0′E
- Parent range: Central Siberian Plateau

Geology
- Rock ages: Archean, Proterozoic and Lower Paleozoic
- Rock types: Gneiss, schist and Limestone

The Anabar Plateau (Russian: Анабарское плато) is a mountain plateau in Krasnoyarsk Krai and the Sakha Republic (Yakutia), Siberia, Russia.

The plateau is in a latitude dominated by permafrost. The permafrost thickness under the Anabar Plateau reaches 1,400 metres (4,600 ft).

== Geography ==
The Anabar Plateau is located north of the Arctic Circle in northeastern Krasnoyarsk Krai and northwestern Sakha Republic, SSE of the Taymyr Depression, the central part of the North Siberian Lowland. It is located north of the Vilyuy Plateau and is the northernmost feature of the Central Siberian Plateau, to which it is connected in the southeast. To the southwest it runs into the higher Putorana Mountains, the border between both not being well-defined. The average height of the plateau surface is around 500 meters (1,600 ft). There are slightly higher tableland type elevations running across the plateau area, mostly in a roughly east to west direction. The highest point is a 905 metres (2,969 ft) high unnamed summit.

The Big Kuonamka, which forms the upper course of the Anabar River, has its source in the plateau and flows in a northeastern direction. Rivers cut deep valleys or canyons, often flanked by scenic cliffs formed by very ancient eroded sediments. The Popigay River has its source in the northeastern sector of the plateau. River Kotuy cuts from the south across the western side and is joined by its tributary Kotuykan from the highest part of the Anabar Plateau. Also to the southeast of the plateau is the source of the Olenyok, which flows east and then northeastwards. Rivers Kengeede and Kyuyonelekeen of the Olenyok basin have their sources at the southern end. To the northwest flows the Khatanga River and to the northeast the Malaya Kuonamka of the Anabar basin. To the east lies the wider basin of the Lena. The Popigai impact structure is located to the NNE of the plateau.

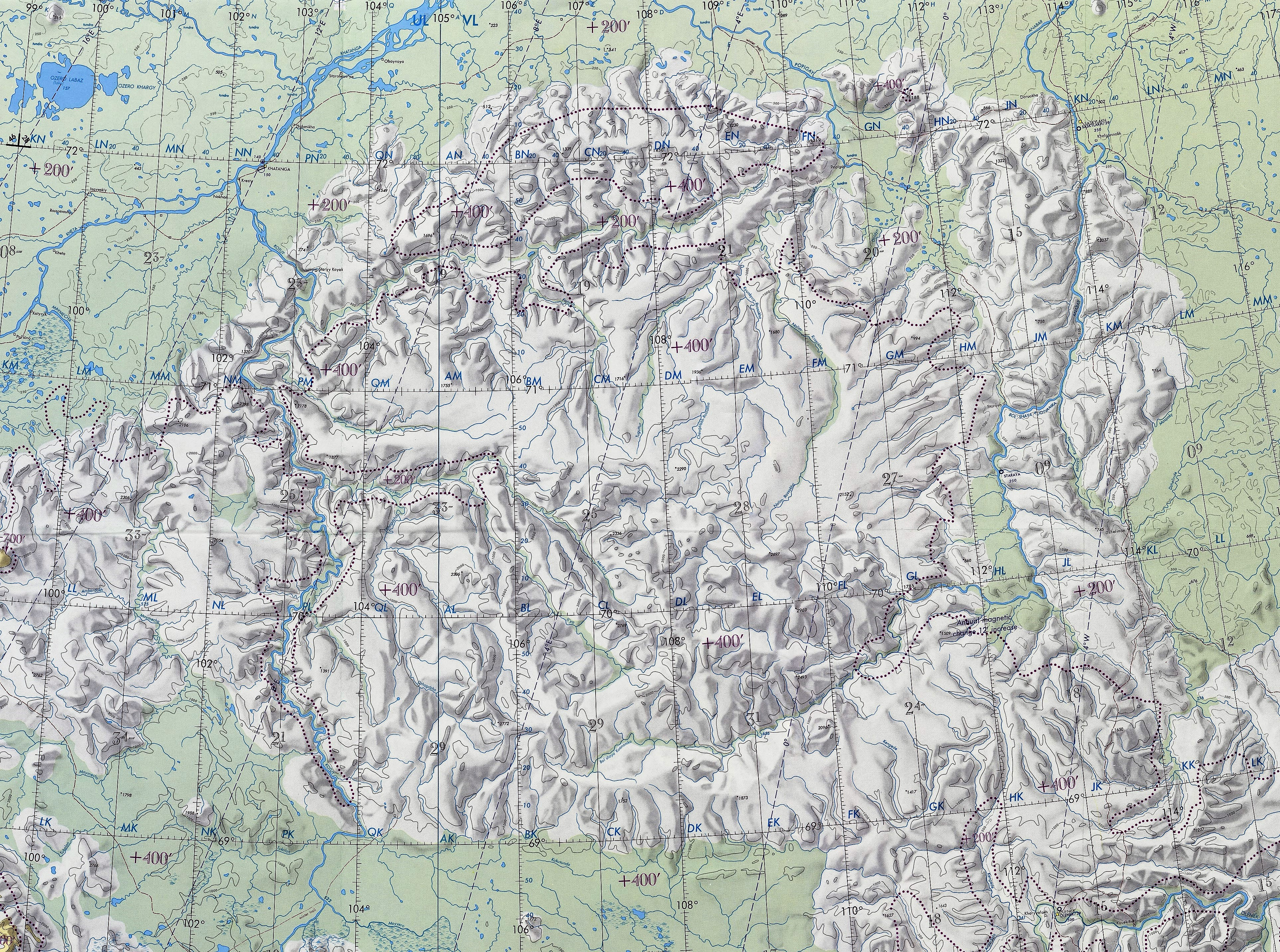
Anabar Plateau map section

== Geology ==
The Anabar Plateau of the Central Siberian Plateau is one of the oldest structures on Earth, with rocks that are more than 3 billion years old. In its central region it is composed of Archean crystalline schists and gneisses. Along the periphery of the plateau Proterozoic and Lower Paleozoic limestones predominate.

=== Anabar Shield ===
The Anabar Plateau coincides geographically with the Anabar Shield, a geological region that is an exposed basement of the Siberian Craton. Together with the Aldan Shield further to the southeast, the Anabar Shield is one of the main features of the craton.

== Flora and climate ==
There are sparse forests of larch in the lower areas up to a height of 450 metres (1,480 ft) and mountain tundra with mosses and lichens in the higher altitudes.

The climate prevailing in the Anabar Plateau is subarctic continental, characterized by a very low average rainfall of less than 250 millimetres (9.8 in) per year. Precipitation falls in the summer, mostly in the form of rain. The average air temperature in January is a chilly −34 °C (−29 °F) with an absolute minimum of −60 °C (−76 °F). The temperature may reach a maximum of 38 °C (100 °F) in July. The average annual temperature is −14 °C (7 °F).
