= Boganida =

Location
- Country: Russia

Physical characteristics
- Mouth: Kheta
  - coordinates: 70.8993°N 95.3420°E
- Length: 366 km (227 mi)
- Basin size: 10,700 km^{2} (4,100 sq mi)

Basin features
- Progression: Kheta→ Khatanga→ Laptev Sea

The Boganida (Russian: Боганида) is a river in Krasnoyarsk Krai in Russia. It is a left tributary of the Kheta (Khatanga basin). The river is 366 kilometres (227 mi) long, and its drainage basin covers 10,700 square kilometres (4,100 mi^{2}). The Boganida is formed by the confluence of the Kegerdi and Khopsokkon, which both originate from Lake Labaz.
