= Taymyr Nature Reserve =

Strict nature reserve in Krasnoyarsk Krai, Russia

- Russian: Таймырский заповедник (Also: Taimyrsky)
- IUCN category Ia (strict nature reserve)
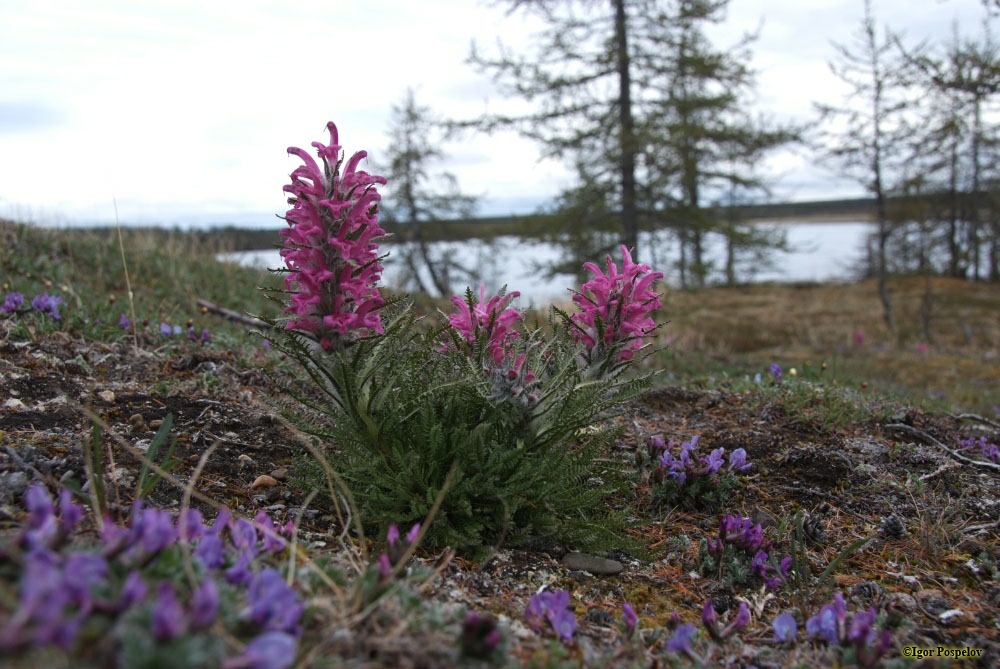
- Taymyr Zapovednik

- Location within Russia
- Location: Krasnoyarsk Krai
- Nearest city: Norilsk
- Coordinates: 73°57′0″N 99°1′0″E
- Area: 1,781,928 hectares (4,403,240 acres; 6,880 sq mi)
- Established: 1979
- Governing body: Ministry of Natural Resources and Environment (Russia)
- Website: http://www.zapovedsever.ru/

Taymyr Nature Reserve (Russian: Таймырский заповедник) (also Taimyrsky) is a Russian 'zapovednik' (strict nature reserve) located in the northern lowlands of Siberia, on the Taimyr Peninsula, and on the coast of the Laptev Sea of the Arctic Ocean. The reserve includes the most northern forest of dahurian larch in the world, and also the most northern mainland mountain range in the world. The protected area was established to protect the breeding grounds of the red-breasted goose Branta ruficollis as well as the summer residences of wild reindeer Rangifer tarandus and the biodiversity of the Lake Taymyr. The reserve is situated about 120 km east of the town of Norilsk, and 3,000 km northeast of Moscow, in the Taymyrsky Dolgano-Nenetsky District of Krasnoyarsk Krai. In 1995, the site was designated a UNESCO MAB (Man and Biosphere) Reserve. The reserve was formally established in 1979, and covers an area of 1,781,928 ha (17,819.28 km^{2}; 6,880.06 sq mi).

== Topography ==
The Taymyr Reserve protects territory in the North Siberian Lowland and the Byrranga Mountains. The terrain is river valley tundra and bogs, and coastal arctic desert. Aside from Byrranga mountains dominant features are Lake Taymyr and the Khatanga River. There are four separate sectors of the reserve:.

- Main Tundra Territory
- Ary-Mas massif. The most northern forest of Dahurian larch, about 20 km by 0.5–4 km, on sandy terraces above the New River. Glacial moraines can reach 100 m in height
- Lukunsky grove
- Arctic. A polar desert zone on the Laptev Sea Coast in the vicinity of Pronchishchev Bay. This sector supports a walrus rookery (1,200 individuals, 2016), polar bear breeding sites (40-50 individuals, 2016), and marine mammals and nesting sites for coastal birds.

It also includes:

Byrranga is the northernmost mainland mountain range in the world, rising from 200 m in the southeast to 1,000 m in the northeast. Mount Byrranga supports 96 glaciers (2016).

The northeastern part of the reserve includes (with the surrounds) the Levinson-Lessing Lake, a tectonic fault lake with depths up to 130 m.

== Climate and ecoregion ==
Taymyr is located in the Taimyr-Central Siberian tundra ecoregion. This ecoregion covers the shore of the White Sea and the Arctic Ocean, including the inlets and islands. The low wetlands are important breeding grounds for waterfowl.

The climate of Taymyr is Subarctic climate, without dry season (Köppen climate classification Subarctic climate (Dfc)). This climate is characterized by mild summers (only 1–3 months above 10 °C (50.0 °F)) and cold, snowy winters (coldest month below −3 °C (26.6 °F)). In Taimyrsky, the temperature drops rapidly with latitude: the average July temperature is 12.3 °C (54.1 °F) in the south, to 6.5 °C (43.7 °F) in the center at Lake Taymyr, and 4.0 °C (39.2 °F) in the north. Average precipitation is 200–300 mm/year.

== Flora and fauna ==
The entire reserve is in the zone of continual permafrost, with extensive thermokarst landscapes. The plant life of the reserve is mostly herbs and lichen. In the river valleys and along the lake shores there are thickets of willow and dwarf birch. Although research is ongoing, scientists in a modern inventory have recorded 475 species of vascular plants, 302 species of mosses, and 269 species of lichens.

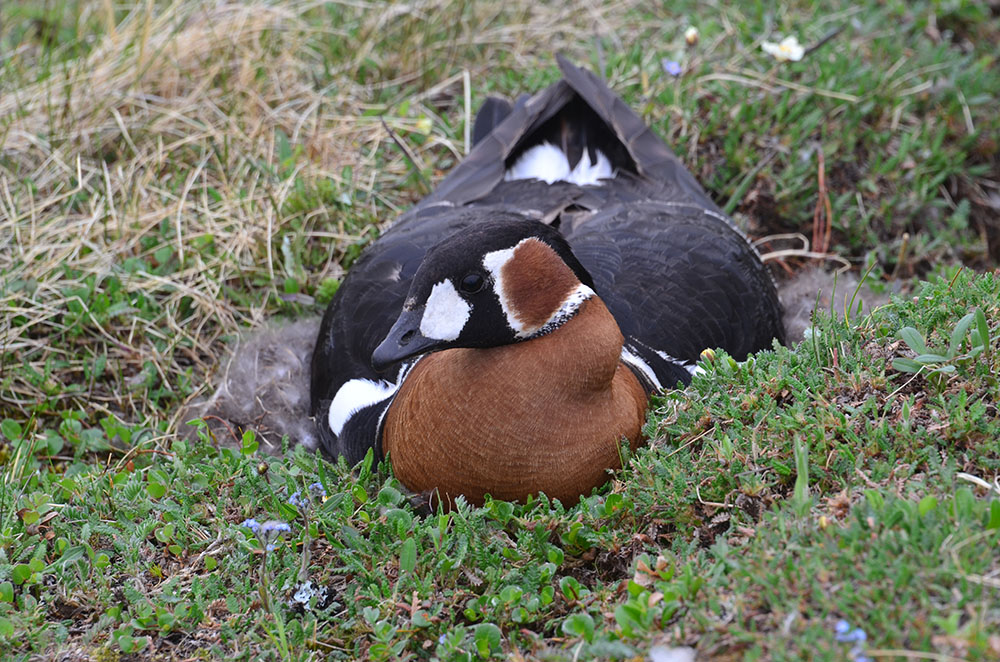
Brantha ruficollis (red breasted goose) in Taymyr Reserve

The animal life of the reserve is sparse: of the 25 species of mammals encountered, half are seasonal or migratory visitors. The most common are West Siberian and collared lemmings. They are the primary food of the predators, mainly arctic fox. Hoofed animals are represented by musk ox and reindeer. As of 2014, the herd of reindeer in the Taimayr region was estimated at 550,000 - 600,000 individuals. The musk ox, reintroduced in the 1970s, have prospered, numbering over 9,000 by 2014. The most common marine mammal is the ringed seal. The coastal sector has a large walrus rookery, and significant polar bear breeding sites. The reserve attracts large number of waterfowl, from 21 species, most of which nest on the site. Geese populations in the tens of thousands collect on Lake Taymyr, and the reserve supports the vulnerable Red-breasted goose. A common sight is the northern wheatear. Most of the migratory birds are only on the reserve site for four months, from May to September.

== Ecoeducation and access ==
As a strict nature reserve, the Taymyr Reserve is mostly closed to the general public, although scientists and those with 'environmental education' purposes can make arrangements with park management for visits. There are a number of 'ecotourist' routes in the reserve, however, that are open to the public, the main ones being in the Byrranga mountains and on the northern coast. Permits must be obtained in advance, and foreign tourists must go through additional security procedures at the main office in the city of Norilsk.

== See also ==
- List of Russian Nature Reserves (class 1a 'zapovedniks')
- National Parks of Russia
