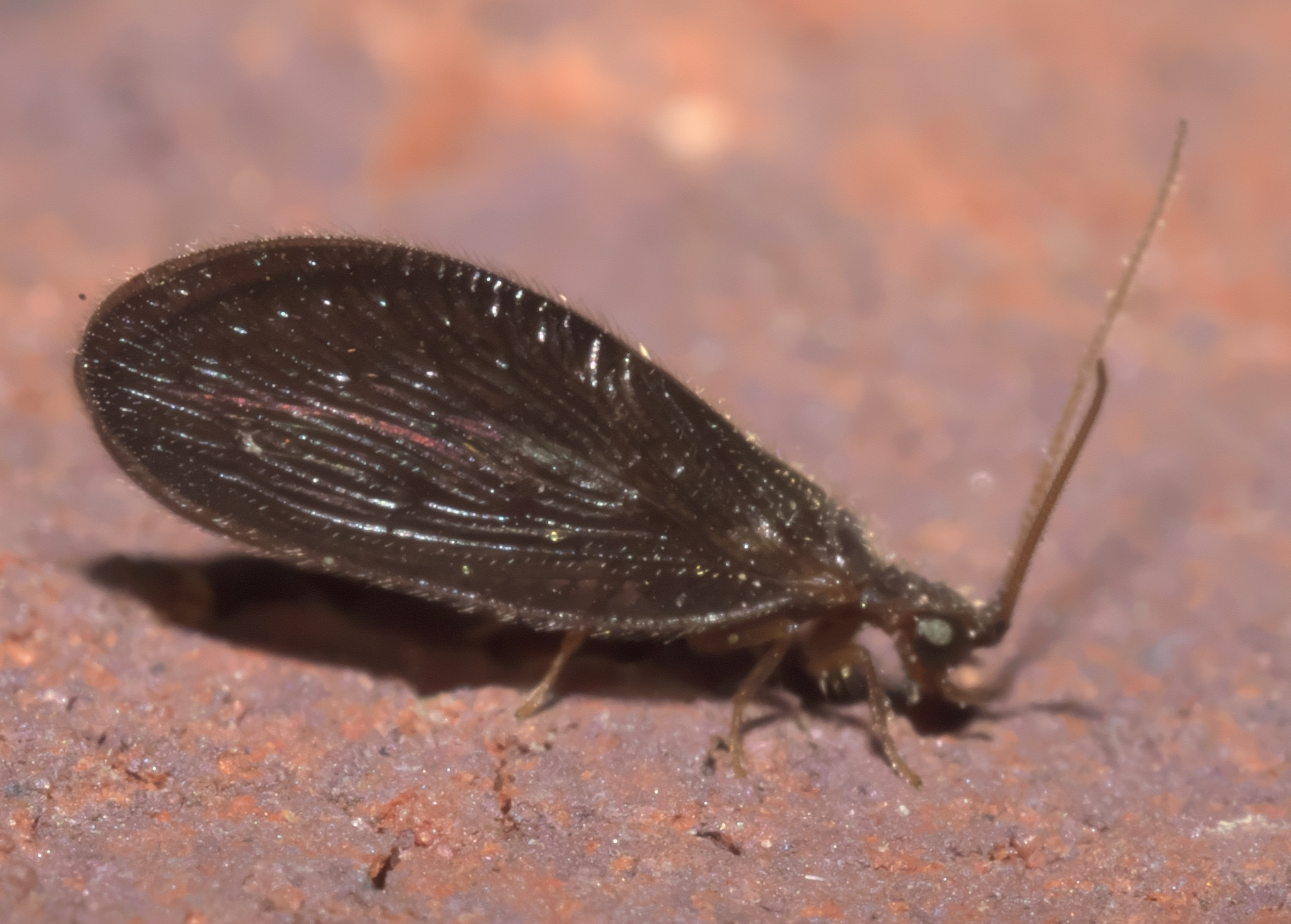
- Sisyra vicaria, Oklahoma

Scientific classification
- Kingdom: Animalia
- Phylum: Arthropoda
- Class: Insecta
- Order: Neuroptera
- Family: Sisyridae
- Genus: Sisyra
- Species: S. vicaria

Binomial name
- Sisyra vicaria (Walker, 1853)

= Sisyra vicaria =

Species of insect

Sisyra vicaria is a species of spongillaflies in the family Sisyridae. It is found in North America.
