= Kotuykan =

Kotuykan Котуйкан
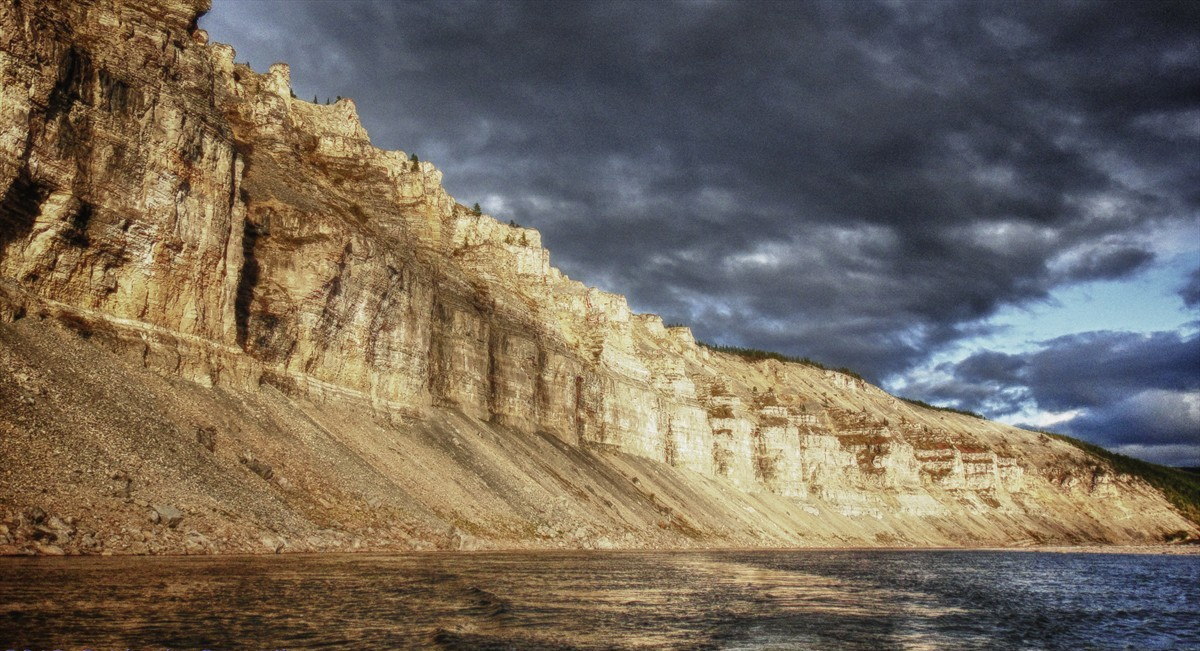
- View of the river

- Location in the Krasnoyarsk Krai, Russia

Location
- Country: Taymyrsky Dolgano-Nenetsky District, Krasnoyarsk Krai, Russia

Physical characteristics
- Source
  - location: Anabar Plateau
  - coordinates: 69°47′20″N 109°16′38″E
  - elevation: 677 m (2,221 ft)
- Mouth: Kotuy
  - coordinates: 70°37′14″N 103°26′59″E
  - elevation: 34 m (112 ft)
- Length: 447 km (278 mi)
- Basin size: 24,300 km^{2} (9,400 sq mi)

Basin features
- Progression: Kotuy→ Khatanga→ Laptev Sea

The Kotuykan (Russian: Котуйкан) is a river in Krasnoyarsk Krai, Russia. It is a right hand tributary of the Kotuy.

The Kotuykan is 447 kilometres (278 mi) long, and the area of its basin is 24,300 square kilometres (9,400 mi^{2}). It freezes up in late September and breaks up in late May or early June.

== Course ==
The Kotuykan has its source in the highest part of the Anabar Plateau. It is a fast-flowing river that flows westwards in a deep valley, often surrounded by picturesque cliffs of marine sediments exposed by erosion that are 1.5 billion years old.

The Kotuykan joins the right bank of the Kotuy as the latter flows from the south across the western side of the Anabar Plateau, 234 kilometres (145 mi) from its mouth and 461 kilometres (286 mi) from the mouth of the Khatanga in the Laptev Sea.

Its main tributaries are the 102 kilometres (63 mi) long Ilya (Илья) and the 54 kilometres (34 mi) long Dyogdyo (Дёгдё).

== See also ==
- List of rivers of Russia
