= Sisyra apicalis =

Scientific classification
- Domain: Eukaryota
- Kingdom: Animalia
- Phylum: Arthropoda
- Class: Insecta
- Order: Neuroptera
- Family: Sisyridae
- Genus: Sisyra
- Species: S. apicalis

Binomial name
- Sisyra apicalis Banks, 1908

Synonyms
- Sisyra nocturna Navás, 1932

Species of insect

Sisyra apicalis is a species of spongillafly in the family Sisyridae. It is found in the Caribbean Sea, Central America, North America, and South America.
