= Kotuy =

Kotuy Котуй
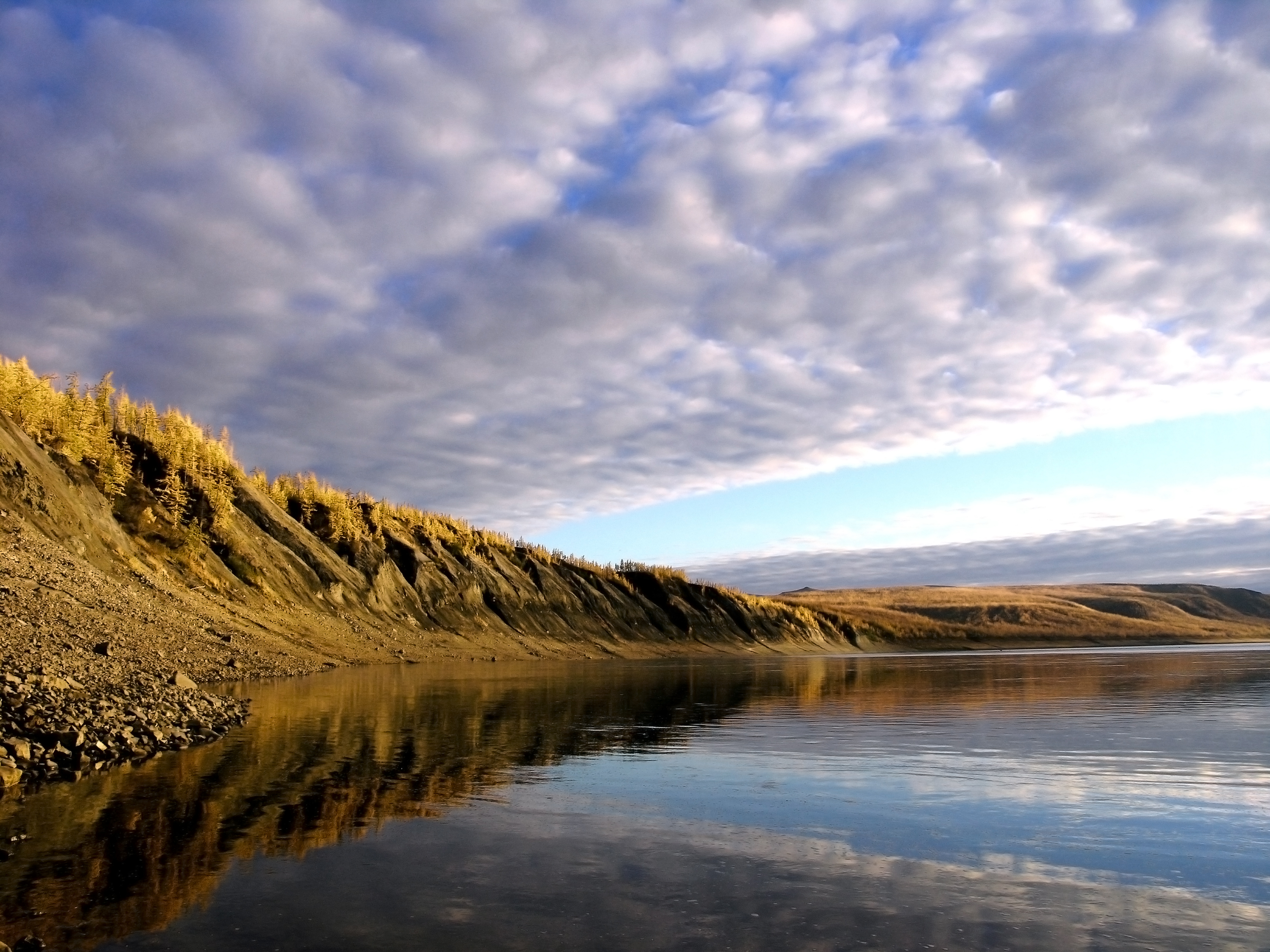
- View of the river

- Location in the Krasnoyarsk Krai, Russia

Location
- Country: Taymyrsky Dolgano-Nenetsky District, Krasnoyarsk Krai, Russia

Physical characteristics
- Source
  - location: Putorana Mountains
  - coordinates: 69°4′13″N 94°52′27″E
  - elevation: 753 m (2,470 ft)
- Mouth
  - location: Confluence with the Kheta to form the Khatanga
  - coordinates: 71°54′56″N 102°6′10″E
  - elevation: 1 m (3 ft 3 in)
- Length: 1,409 km (876 mi)
- Basin size: 176,000 km^{2} (68,000 sq mi)

Basin features
- Progression: Khatanga→ Laptev Sea

The Kotuy (Russian: Котуй) is a river in Krasnoyarsk Krai, Russia. It is one of the two rivers that form the Khatanga; the other one being the Kheta.

The Kotuy is 1,409 kilometres (876 mi) long, and the area of its basin is 176,000 square kilometres (68,000 mi^{2}). It freezes up in late September or early October and breaks up in late May or early June.

== Course ==
The Kotuy has its source in the Putorana Mountains and flows north, cutting from the south across the western side of the Anabar Plateau. After leaving the plateau area it flows northwestwards until the confluence with the Kheta to form the Khatanga, a little distance upstream from Khatanga town.

Its main tributaries are the Moyero, the Tukalan, the Eriyechka, the Changada, and the Kotuykan, which has its source in the highest part of the Anabar Plateau. Lake Yessey is part of the river basin.

== See also ==
- List of rivers of Russia
