= Popigay (river) =

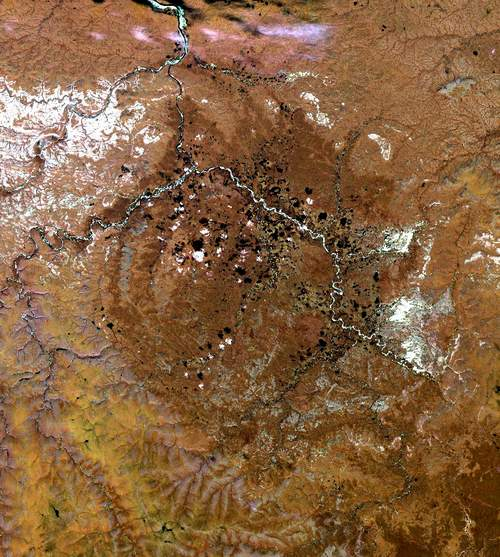

- Mouth location in Krasnoyarsk Krai, Russia Popigay (river) (Russia)

Location
- Country: Russia

Physical characteristics
- Mouth: Khatanga
  - coordinates: 72°57′38″N 106°09′14″E
- Length: 532 km (331 mi)
- Basin size: 50,300 km^{2} (19,400 sq mi)

Basin features
- Progression: Khatanga→ Laptev Sea

The Popigay (Russian: Попигай) is a river in Krasnoyarsk Krai, Russia. It is a right tributary of the Khatanga. The length of the river is 532 kilometers (331 mi). The area of its drainage basin is 50,300 square kilometers (19,400 sq mi). The river has its source in the Anabar Plateau. It freezes up in October and breaks up in June. Its main tributaries are the Rassokha and Fomich.

The river passes by the Popigay crater, about 900 kilometers (560 mi) northeast of Norilsk.

== See also ==
- List of rivers of Russia
