= Ary-Mas =

Coordinates: 72.467°N 102.249°E

Location within Krasnoyarsk Krai, Russia

Ary-Mas (Russian: Ары-Мас) is a forest in Russia, Krasnoyarsk Krai, southern part of Taymyr Peninsula, southern bank of Novaya River. Ary-Mas comes from the Dolgan language and means "forest island".

It is considered to be the northernmost forest of the world, although Lukunsky grove to the east from it extends six kilometres further north. Though, while Lukunsky grove is the northernmost rim of the larger forest massif, Ary-Mas is a forest island separated from the nearest forest by an approximately two hundred kilometres wide zone of tundra.

== Climate ==
The vegetation period is approximately one hundred days long. Winter here lasts from late September - early October to June; minimum temperatures often fall below −35 to −45 °C, and wind speed in winter often exceeds 50 m/s.

The polar day lasts from the early May to early August, median temperature in July is 12 °C, often up to 30 °C.

Permafrost in summer thaws 0.3 – 2 metres deep. The thickness of permafrost here is approximately two hundred metres.

== Biodiversity ==
The only tree-form species of Ary-Mas is Dahurian larch (Larix gmelinii), but in total in Ary-Mas 306 species of plants, 90 species of birds, and 20 species of mammals have been found.

Dahurian larch grows sparsely, separate trees grow up to 5 – 7 metres tall.

== Conservation and scientific investigations ==
Ary-Mas is a protected territory with area 15,611 square kilometres (6,027 sq mi). It forms a part of Taymyr State Nature Biosphere Reserve and is protected since 1979.

Constant investigations of Dahurian larch started in 1969 and have continued since then. Current scientific studies are led by the Taymyr State Nature Biosphere Reserve and major part of results are compiled in yearly nature reports.
