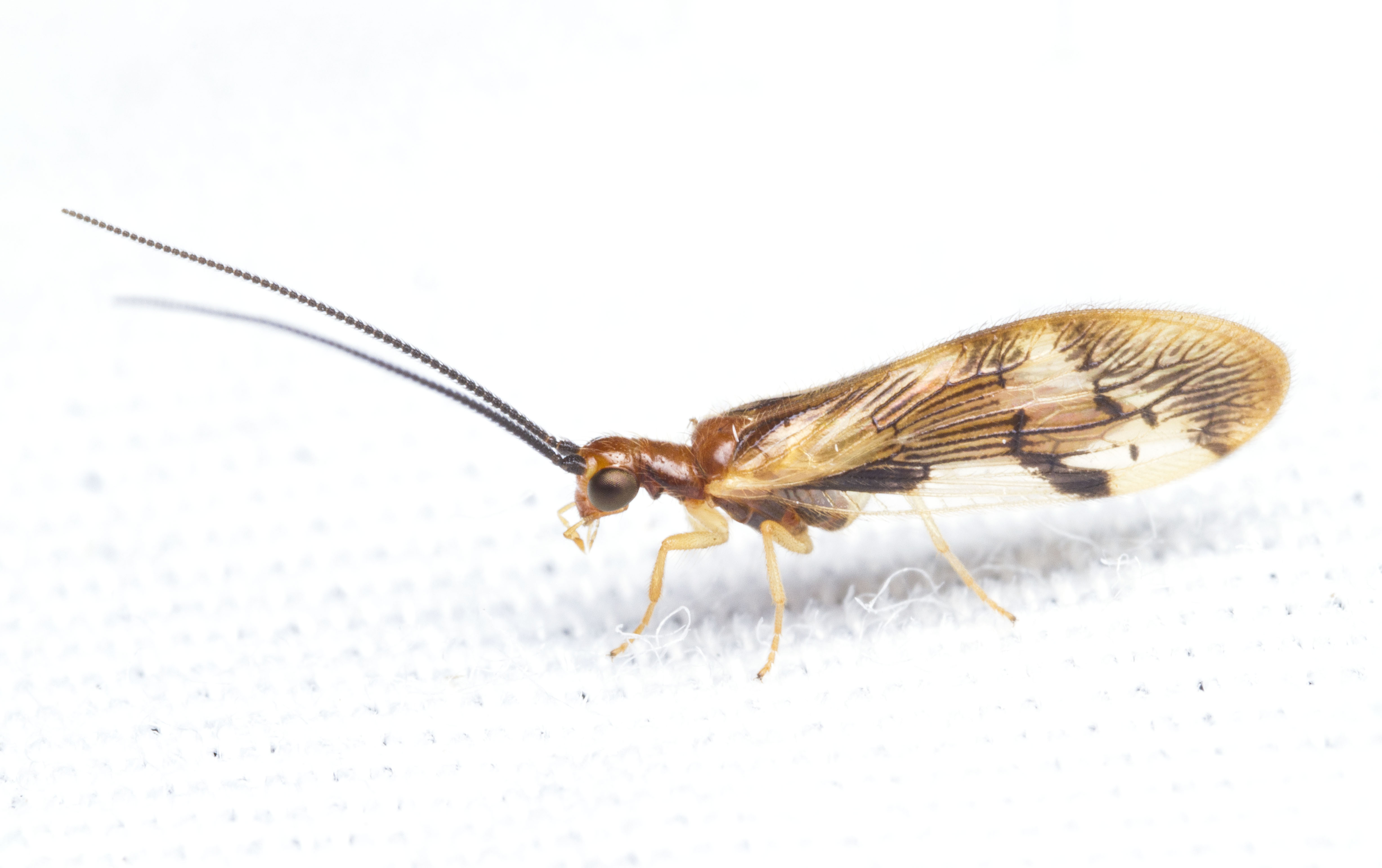
- Climacia areolaris

Scientific classification
- Kingdom: Animalia
- Phylum: Arthropoda
- Class: Insecta
- Order: Neuroptera
- Family: Sisyridae
- Subfamily: Sisyrinae
- Genus: Climacia; McLachlan, 1869

= Climacia =

Genus of insects

Climacia is a genus of spongillaflies in the family Sisyridae. There are more than 20 described species in Climacia.

== Species ==
These 22 species belong to the genus Climacia:

- Climacia amalla Flint, 1998
- Climacia antillana Alayo, 1968
- Climacia areolaris (Hagen, 1861)
- Climacia basalis Banks, 1913
- Climacia bifasciata Penny & Rafael, 1982
- Climacia bimaculata Banks, 1913
- Climacia californica Chandler, 1953
- Climacia carpenteri Parfin & Gurney, 1956
- Climacia chapini Parfin & Gurney, 1956
- Climacia chilena Parfin & Gurney, 1956
- Climacia desordenata Monserrat, 2005
- Climacia doradensis Flint, 1998
- Climacia insolita Flint, 1998
- Climacia lemniscata Flint, 1998
- Climacia negrensis Penny, 1981
- Climacia nota Parfin & Gurney, 1956
- Climacia punctulata Flint, 2006
- Climacia striata Parfin & Gurney, 1956
- Climacia tenebra Parfin & Gurney, 1956
- Climacia townesi Parfin & Gurney, 1956
- Climacia triplehorni Flint, 1998
- Climacia versicolor Flint, 1998
