= Maymecha =

Location
- Country: Russia

Physical characteristics
- Mouth: Kheta
  - coordinates: 71.3489°N 99.5017°E
- Length: 650 km (400 mi)
- Basin size: 26,500 km^{2} (10,200 sq mi)

Basin features
- Progression: Kheta→ Khatanga→ Laptev Sea

The Maymecha, also known as Medvezhye (Russian: Маймеча, Медвежье), is a river in Taymyrsky Dolgano-Nenetsky District of Krasnoyarsk Krai in Russia, right tributary of the Kheta (Khatanga basin).

== Description ==
The length of the river is 650 kilometres (400 mi). The area of its drainage basin is 26,500 square kilometres (10,200 mi^{2}).
