= Taimyr–Central Siberian tundra =

Ecoregion in Russia

Taimyr-Central Siberian tundra
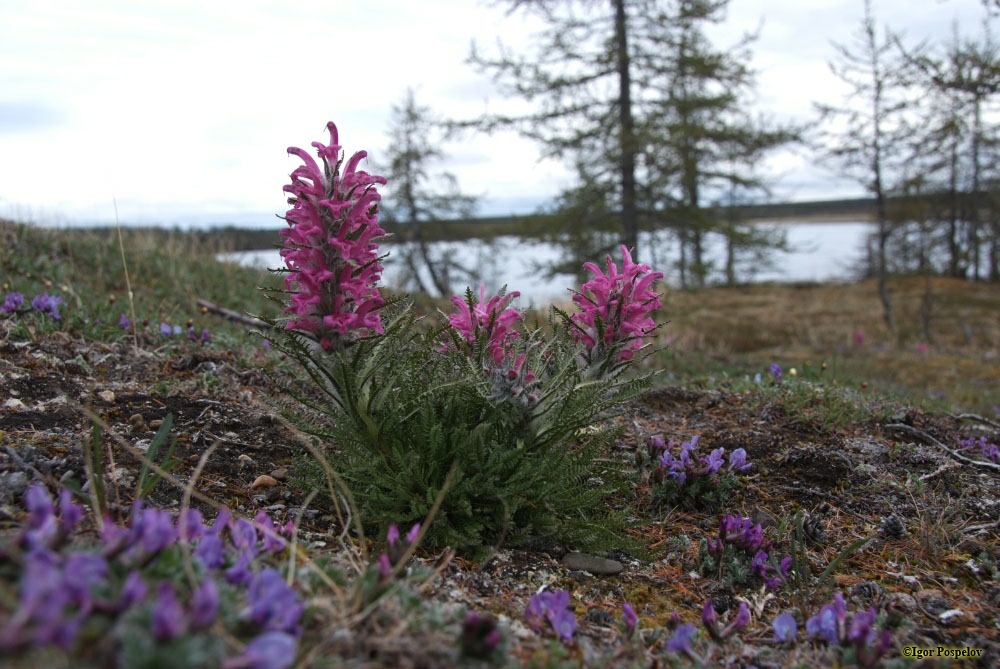
- Summer landscape in Taymyr Nature Reserve

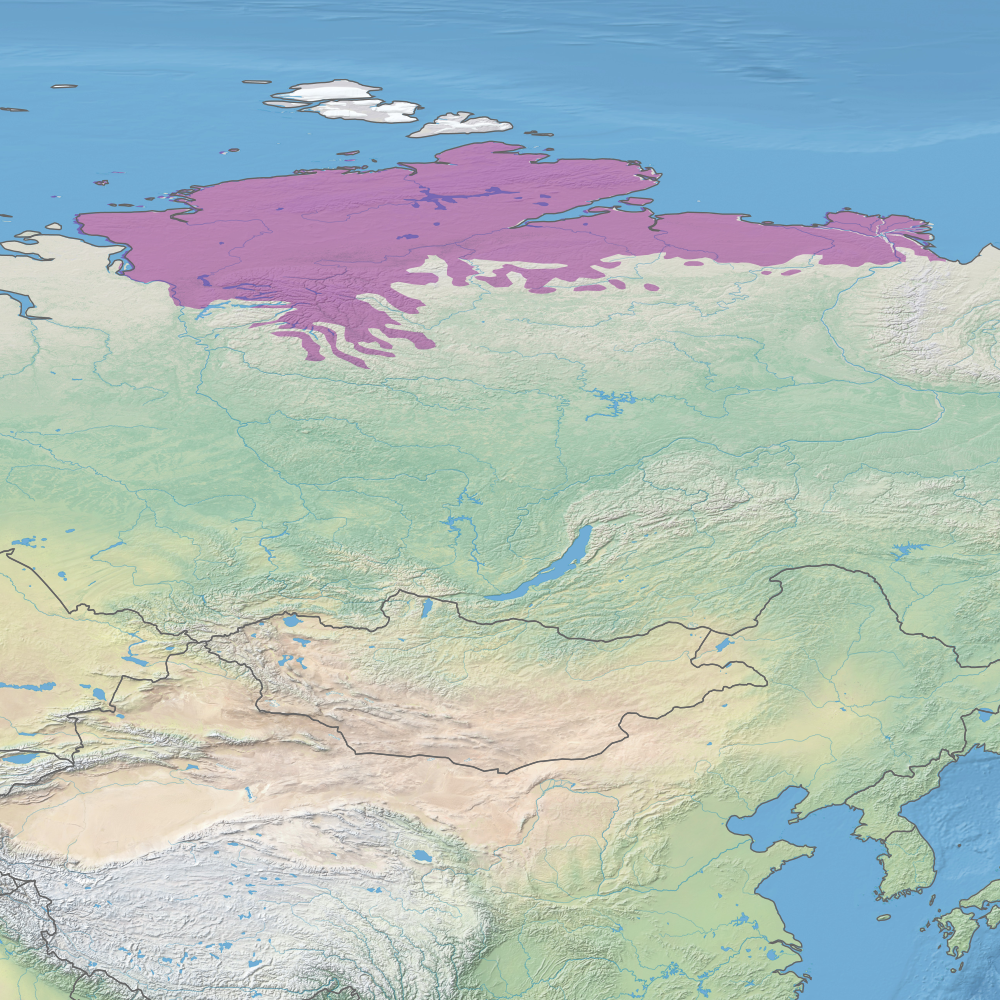
- Ecoregion territory (in purple)

Ecology
- Realm: Palearctic
- Biome: tundra

Geography
- Area: 954,670 km^{2} (368,600 sq mi)
- Countries: Russia
- Coordinates: 72.25°N 101.25°E

The Taimyr-Central Siberian tundra ecoregion (WWF ID: PA1111) is an ecoregion that broadly covers the Taymyr Peninsula in the Russian Far North. It ranges from the delta of the Yenisei River in the west, across the Taymyr Peninsula and Khatanga Gulf, to the Lena River delta in the east. The region is an important area for breeding birds. It is in the Palearctic realm in the tundra biome, and is mostly located in Taymyrsky Dolgano-Nenetsky District of Krasnoyarsk Krai. It has an area of 954,670 square kilometres (368,600 sq mi).

== Location and description ==
The Taymyr Peninsula reaches into the Arctic Ocean, between the Kara Sea and the Laptev Sea in northern Siberia. Unlike much of the Arctic North, which is lowland tundra, the Taymyr Peninsula is built around highlands - the Byrranga Mountains. A notable feature of the ecoregion is Lake Taymyr, a large (165 km long) lake in the south of the Byrranga Mountains. The coastal plain to the north is arctic coastal desert and tundra, with terrain to the south of the mountains featuring tundra, wetlands, and thermokarst. The area is one of continual permafrost.

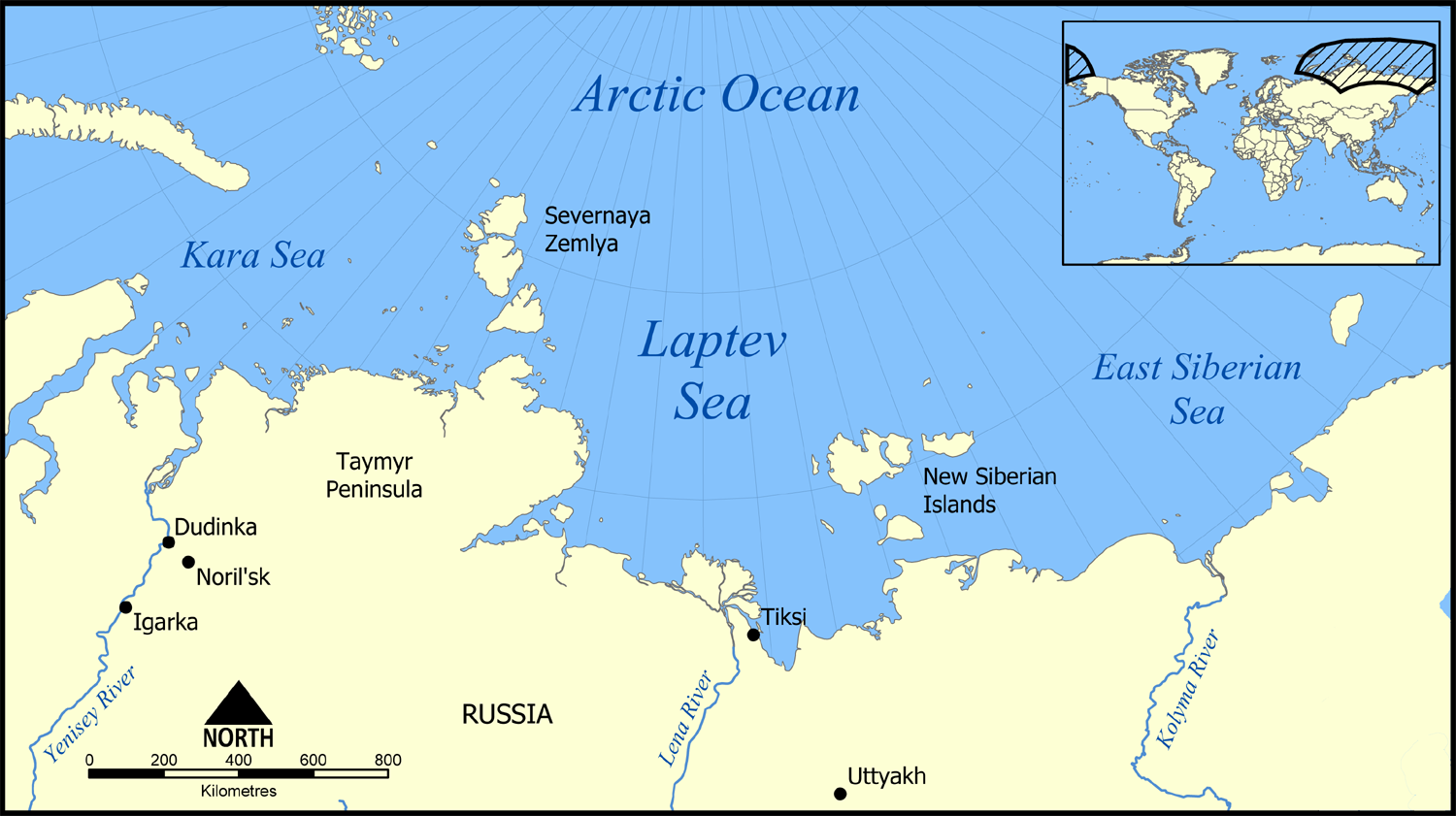
Location of Taymyr Peninsula

== Climate ==
The region has a tundra climate (Koppen ET), with the southern regions grading into subarctic (DWC). Mean precipitation is about 257mm/year. The mean temperature at the center of the ecoregion is −33.5 °C (−28.3 °F) in January, and 13.2 °C (55.8 °F) in July.

== Flora and fauna ==
The flora is predominantly forbs, grasses, dwarf shrubs, and lichen. Sparse stands of willow and dwarf birch can be found in river valleys and along lake shores.

Mammals are scarce, with half being seasonal or migratory visitors. The ecoregion is the most important breeding area in Central Asia for migratory birds. in late-July and August, the total number of geese is estimated at 30,000-40,000. There are two breeding colonies of the vulnerable red-breasted goose (Branta ruficollis).

== Protections ==
There are several significant nationally protected area that reach into this ecoregion:

- Putorana Nature Reserve, situated on the Putorana Plateau south of Taymyr Peninsula,
- Great Arctic State Nature Reserve, located on the coast west of the Taymyr Peninsula,
- Taymyr Nature Reserve, located on four different sectors of the Taymyr region, including the Laptev coast, the Byrranga mountains, and lowland areas, and
- Lena Delta Wildlife Reserve, covering the lower reaches of the Lena River as it reaches the Laptev Sea.

== See also ==
- List of ecoregions in Russia
