= Lukunsky grove =

Forest in Krasnoyarsk Krai, Russia

Coordinates: 72°31′03″N 105°03′05″E

The Lukunsky grove (Russian: Лукунский) is a forest in Krasnoyarsk Krai, Russia, on the southern bank of the Lukunskaya River, to the south of the Khatanga River. It is the northernmost forest extension in the world. Ary-Mas, to the west of the Lukunsky grove, is the northernmost isolated forest island, located approximately 6 km (3.7 mi) to the south.

== Climate ==
The vegetation period is approximately 100 days long. Winter lasts from the late September or early October to June, with minimum temperatures often falling below −45 °C (−49 °F).

The polar day lasts from early May to early August. The average temperature in July is 12 °C (54 °F), often reaching 30 °C (86 °F).

Permafrost in summer thaws to 0.3–2 m (1 ft 0 in – 6 ft 7 in) deep. The thickness of the permafrost is approximately 200 m (660 ft).

== Biodiversity ==
The only tree species of the Lukunsky grove is the Dahurian larch (Larix gmelinii (Rupr.) Rupr.)), but in total there are 268 species of plants, 78 species of birds, and 16 species of mammals. The species composition shows that Lukunsky grove is rather a part of taiga and not tundra. Individual Dahurian larch trees grow up to 5–7 m (16–23 ft) tall. The Lukunsky grove forms a northern part of a wider forest massif extending for hundreds of kilometres to the south.

== Conservation and scientific investigations ==
The Lukunsky grove is a protected territory with an area of 90.55 km^{2} (34.96 sq mi), although that area includes other biotopes as well. It forms a part of Taymyr State Nature Biosphere Reserve and has been protected since 1979.

Scientific studies in the Lukunsky grove are led by the Taymyr State Nature Biosphere Reserve and major part of results are compiled in yearly nature reports.
