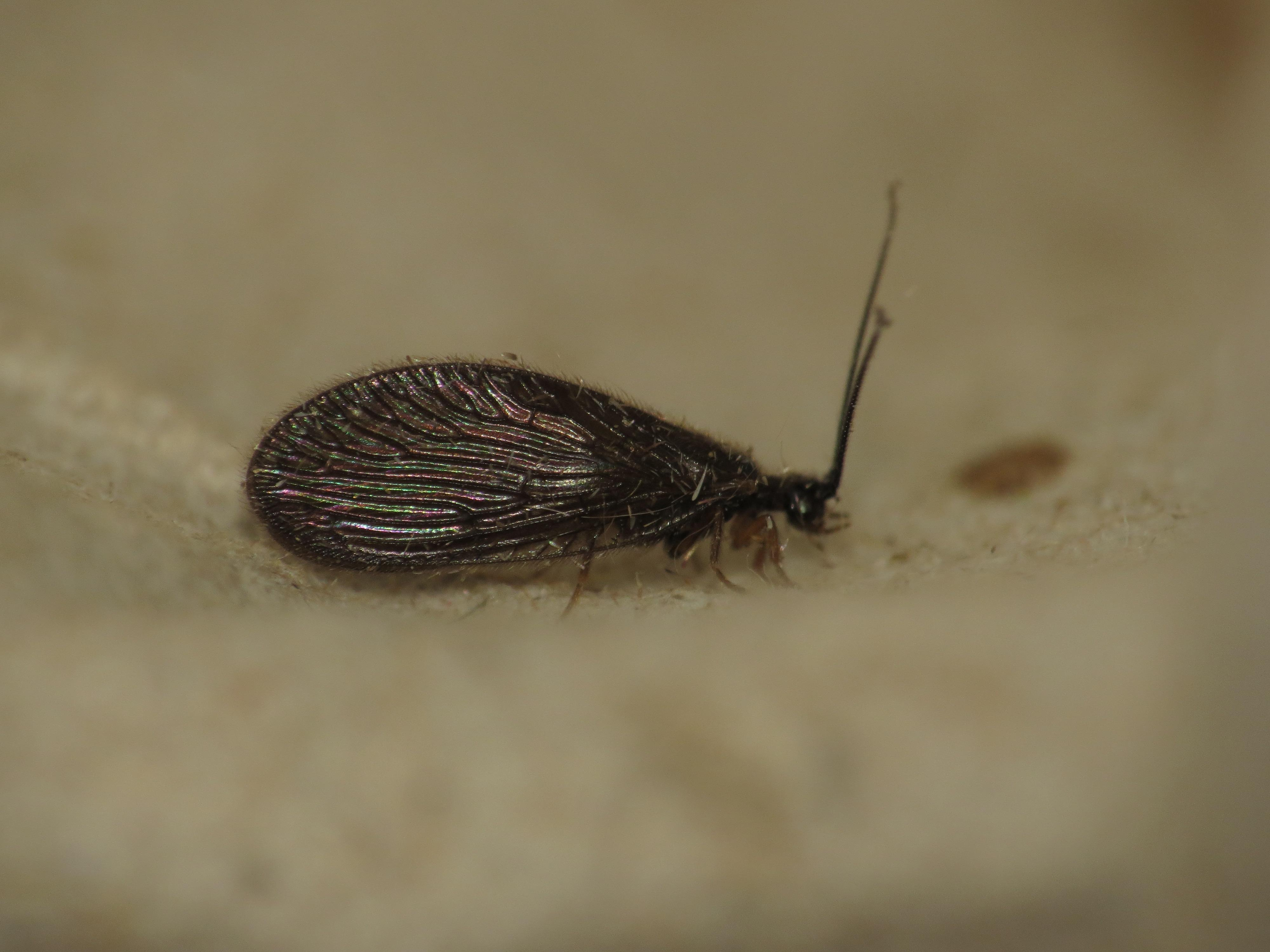

Scientific classification
- Domain: Eukaryota
- Kingdom: Animalia
- Phylum: Arthropoda
- Class: Insecta
- Order: Neuroptera
- Family: Sisyridae
- Genus: Sisyra
- Species: S. nigra

Binomial name
- Sisyra nigra (Retzius, 1783)

Synonyms
- Sisyra fuscata (Fabricius, 1793)

= Sisyra nigra =

Species of insect

Sisyra nigra is a species of spongillafly in the family Sisyridae. It is found in Europe and Northern Asia (excluding China) and North America.

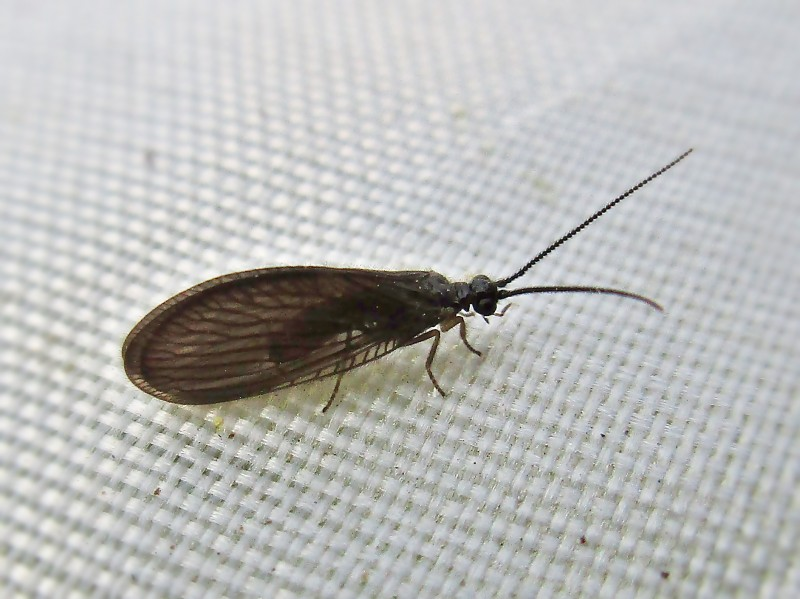
