= Novaya (river) =

River in Russia

Location
- Country: Russia

Physical characteristics
- Mouth: Khatanga
  - coordinates: 72°20′44″N 103°00′58″E
- Length: 411 km (255 mi)
- Basin size: 16,500 km^{2} (6,400 sq mi)

Basin features
- Progression: Khatanga→ Laptev Sea

The Novaya (Russian: Новая) is a river in Krasnoyarsk Krai in Russia. It is a left tributary of the Khatanga. It originates in Lake Gavrila. It is 411 kilometres (255 mi) long, and has a drainage basin of 16,500 square kilometres (6,400 sq mi). It flows through the North Siberian Lowland in the Taymyrsky Dolgano-Nenetsky District. It is mostly fed by rain and snow melt.
