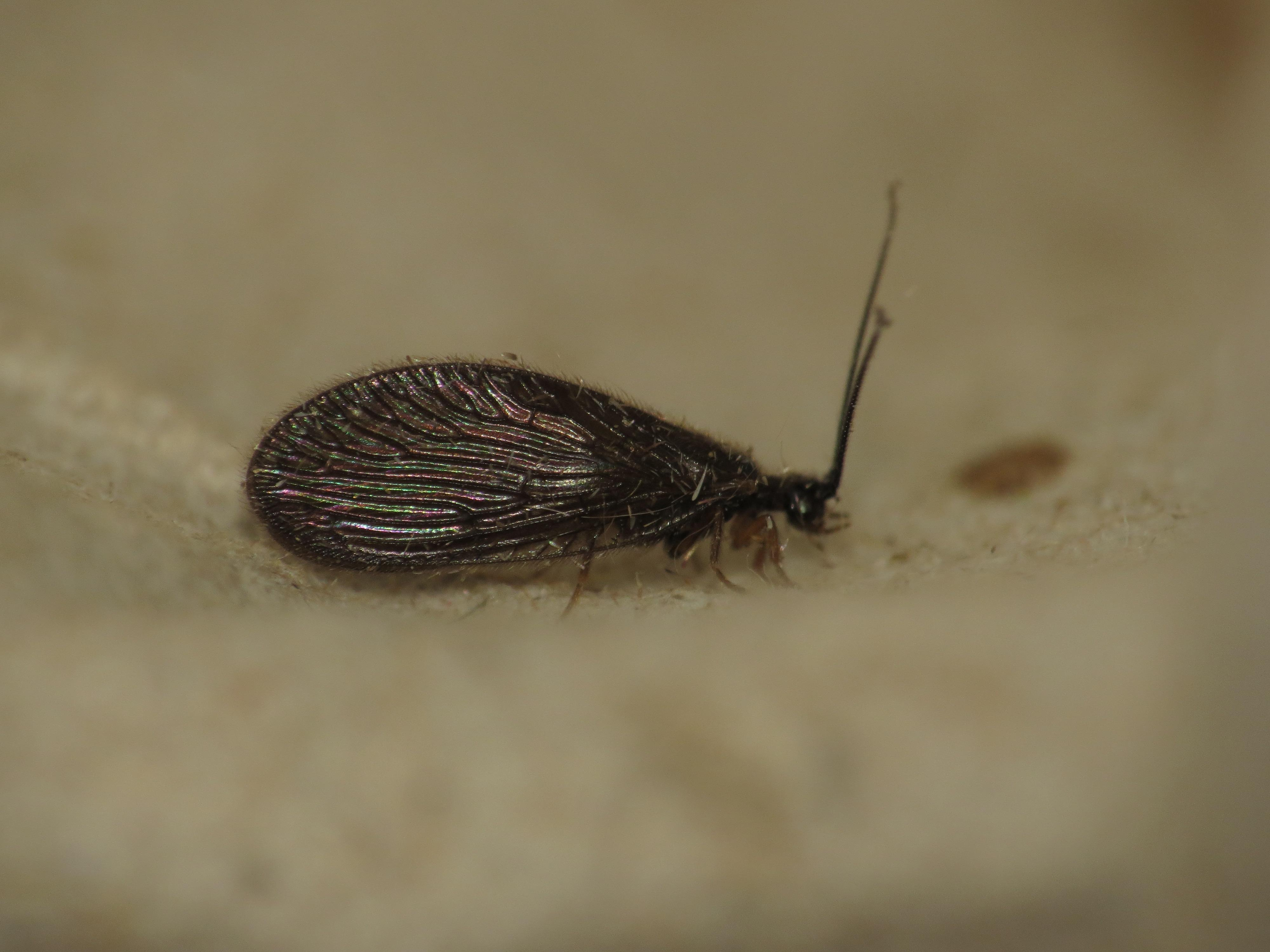
- Sisyra nigra

Scientific classification
- Kingdom: Animalia
- Phylum: Arthropoda
- Class: Insecta
- Order: Neuroptera
- Family: Sisyridae
- Subfamily: Sisyrinae
- Genus: Sisyra; Burmeister, 1839

= Sisyra =

Genus of lacewings

Sisyra is a genus of lacewings in the family Sisyridae. There are at least 8 described species in Sisyra.

== Species ==
- Sisyra amazonica Penny, 1981
- Sisyra apicalis Banks, 1908
- Sisyra ariasi Penny, 1981
- Sisyra elongata Penny and Rafael, 1982
- Sisyra minuta Esben-Petersen, 1935
- Sisyra nigra (Retzius, 1783)
- Sisyra panama Parfin and Gurney, 1956
- Sisyra vicaria (Walker, 1853)
