= Kheta (river) =

- Mouth location in Krasnoyarsk Krai, Russia Kheta (river) (Russia)

Location
- Country: Russia

Physical characteristics
- Mouth: Khatanga
  - coordinates: 71°54′54″N 102°07′22″E
- Length: 604 km (375 mi)
- Basin size: 100,000 km^{2} (39,000 sq mi)

Basin features
- Progression: Khatanga→ Laptev Sea

The Kheta (Russian: Хета) is a river in Krasnoyarsk Krai in Russia, left composite of the Khatanga River. The river is 604 kilometres (375 mi) long. The area of its drainage basin is 100,000 square kilometres (39,000 mi^{2}).

== Course ==
The Kheta is formed by the confluence of the Ayan and Ayakli, both of which originate in the Putorana Plateau. The Kheta freezes up in late September or early October and breaks up in late May or the first half of June. Its main tributaries are the Boyarka, Maymecha, and Boganida.

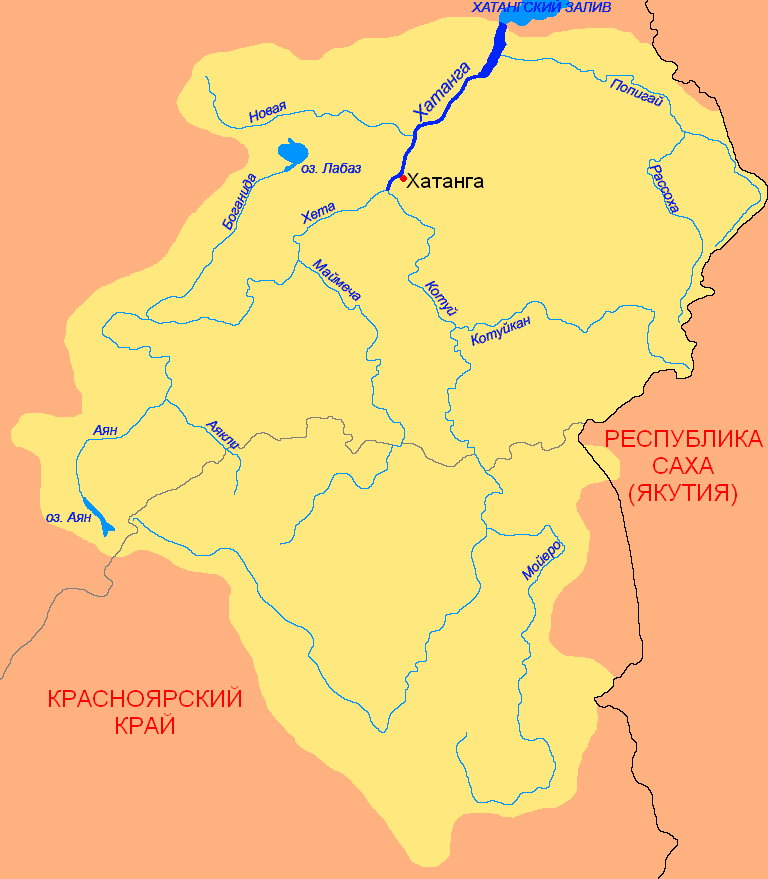
Basin of the Khatanga

== See also ==
- List of rivers of Russia
