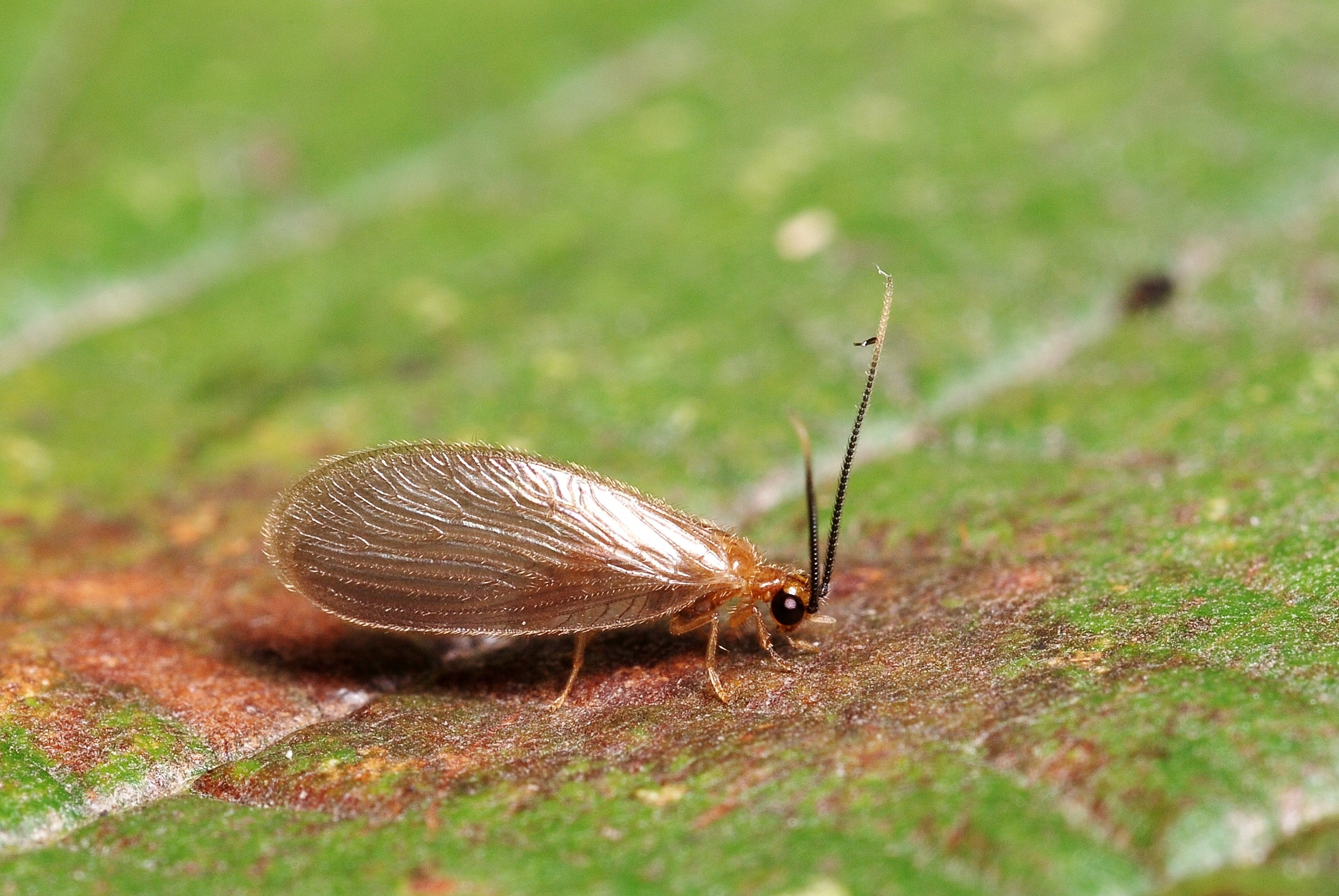
- Sisyra terminalis imago

Scientific classification
- Kingdom: Animalia
- Phylum: Arthropoda
- Clade: Pancrustacea
- Class: Insecta
- Order: Neuroptera
- Superfamily: Osmyloidea
- Family: Sisyridae; Banks, 1905

Subfamilies
- See text

= Sisyridae =

Sisyridae Temporal range: Cenomanian–Recent

Family of insects

Sisyridae, commonly known as spongeflies or spongillaflies, are a family of winged insects in the order Neuroptera. There are approximately 60 living species described, and several extinct species identified from the fossil record.

== Description ==
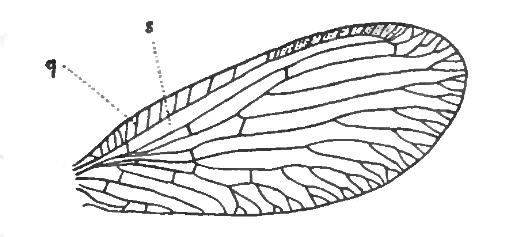
Forewing venation of Sisyra nigra

In general appearance, the adults resemble some brown lacewings (Hemerobiidae). The forewings of spongillaflies have a span of 4–10 millimetres. The greyish or brownish wings have few cross veins except in the costal field, and most of these are not forked. The subcostal (Sc) and radial (R1) veins are fused near the wingtip.

The larvae of spongillaflies look rather bizarre. Similar to those of some osmylids (Osmylidae) at first glance, they have spindly legs on a bulky thorax, long antennae, and flexible, threadlike mouthparts. However, the second and third instars carry seven pairs of jointed, movable tracheal gills beneath their plump abdomen. These gills are possessed by no other extant insect family, and readily distinguish them from osmylid larvae.

== Ecology and life cycle ==
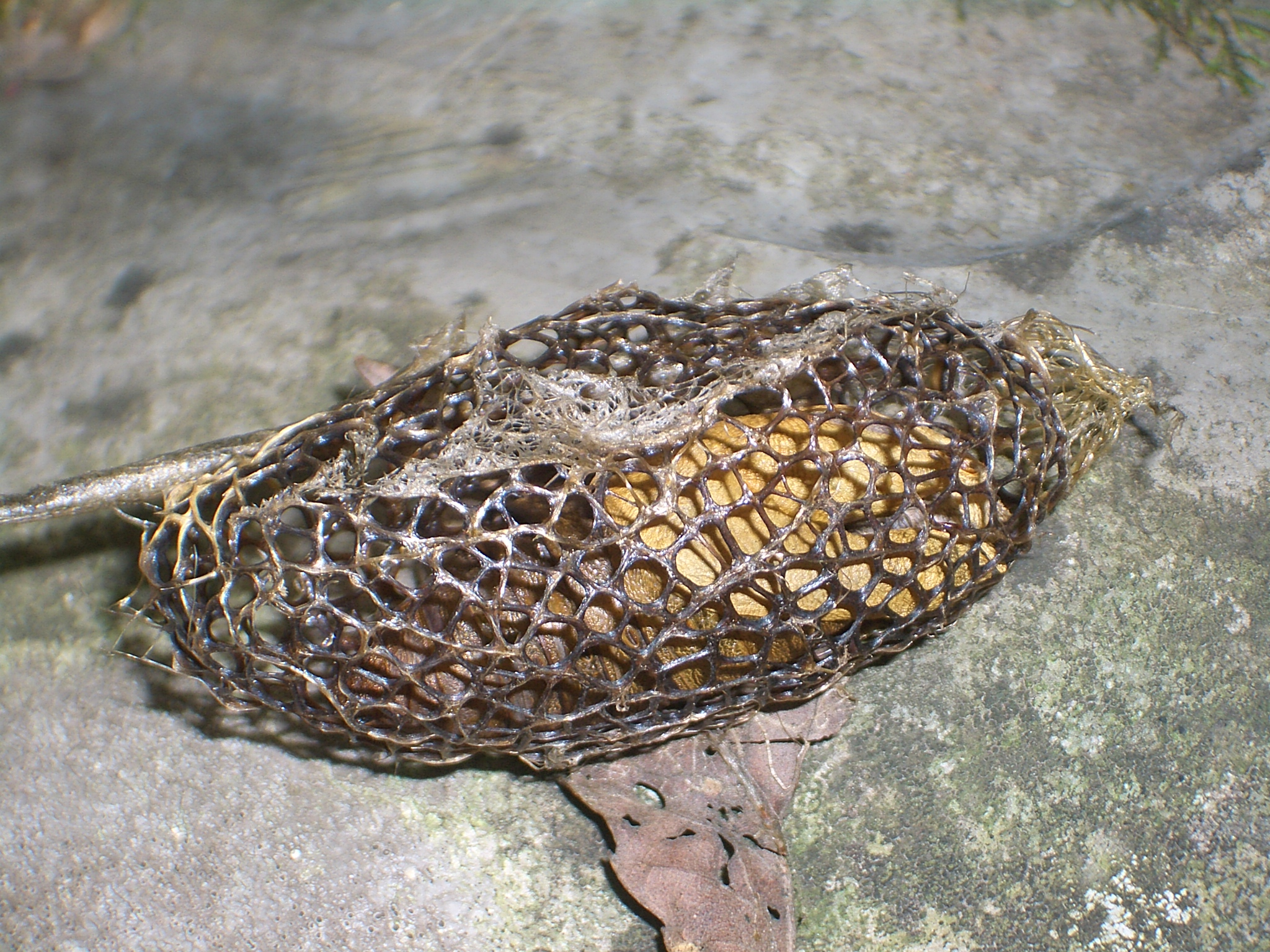
Cocoon and pupa.

Adult spongillaflies are crepuscular or nocturnal. They are omnivores, sometimes hunting small invertebrates, but mainly scavenging on such animals' carcasses, as well as on pollen and honeydew.

The females deposit their eggs singly or as small clutches on plants that droop over freshwater lakes or slow-moving rivers. A protective web is spun to cover the eggs. When the larvae hatch, they drop down into the water where they develop until pupation. They use their elongated mouthparts to feed upon freshwater sponges (e.g. of the genus Spongilla, hence the name "spongillaflies") and Phylactolaemata freshwater bryozoans, by piercing the host animals' body and sucking out cell contents. The antennae are stouter than they look and are used to aid in locomotion. Development to pupation takes between several weeks and one year.

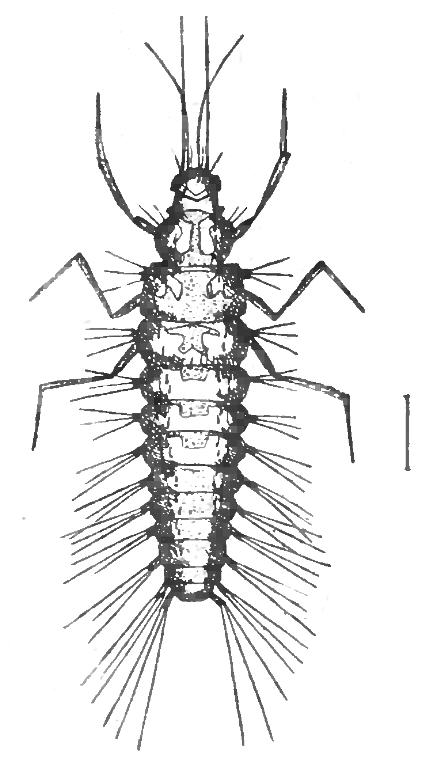
Sisyra sp. larva

Spongillafly larvae leave the water and go to hidden places nearby to pupate, choosing locations like beneath rocks or behind tree bark. They spin a cocoon for pupation, but in temperate climates they overwinter in the cocoon as larvae, pupating only the following spring.

== Systematics and taxonomy ==
Spongillaflies are placed in the Osmyloidea, as their closest relatives are the osmylids (Osmylidae) and the Nevrorthidae.

A few fossil genera are known, mainly from the Eocene like "Sisyra" amissa which may or may not be the first record of the living genus. The genus Cratosisyrops, from the Aptian Crato Formation, was suggested to be a spongillafly member, but later authors Perkovsky and Makarkin in 2015 noted the fossil lacks details to confidently place it in the family. The oldest members of the family are species in the subfamily Paradoxosisyrinae from Cenomanian Burmese amber and Prosisyrina from Santonian Taimyr amber.

The family is currently divided into two subfamilies with the four extant genera and two of the extinct genera placed into Sisyrinae, while five extinct genera are placed into the subfamily Paradoxosisyrinae.

Sisyridae

- †Stictosisyra Yang et al. 2018 Burmese amber, Myanmar, Late Cretaceous (Cenomanian)
- †Paradoxosisyrinae Burmese amber, Myanmar, Late Cretaceous (Cenomanian)
  - †Buratina
  - †Khobotun
  - †Paradoxosisyra
  - †Protosiphoniella
  - †Sidorchukatia
- Sisyrinae
  - Climacia
  - †Paleosisyra Oise amber, France, Eocene (Ypresian) Baltic amber, Eocene Bembridge Marls, United Kingdom, Eocene (Priabonian)
  - †Prosisyrina Taimyr amber, Russia, Late Cretaceous (Santonian)
  - Sisyborina
  - Sisyra
  - Sisyrina
