= Khatanga (river) =

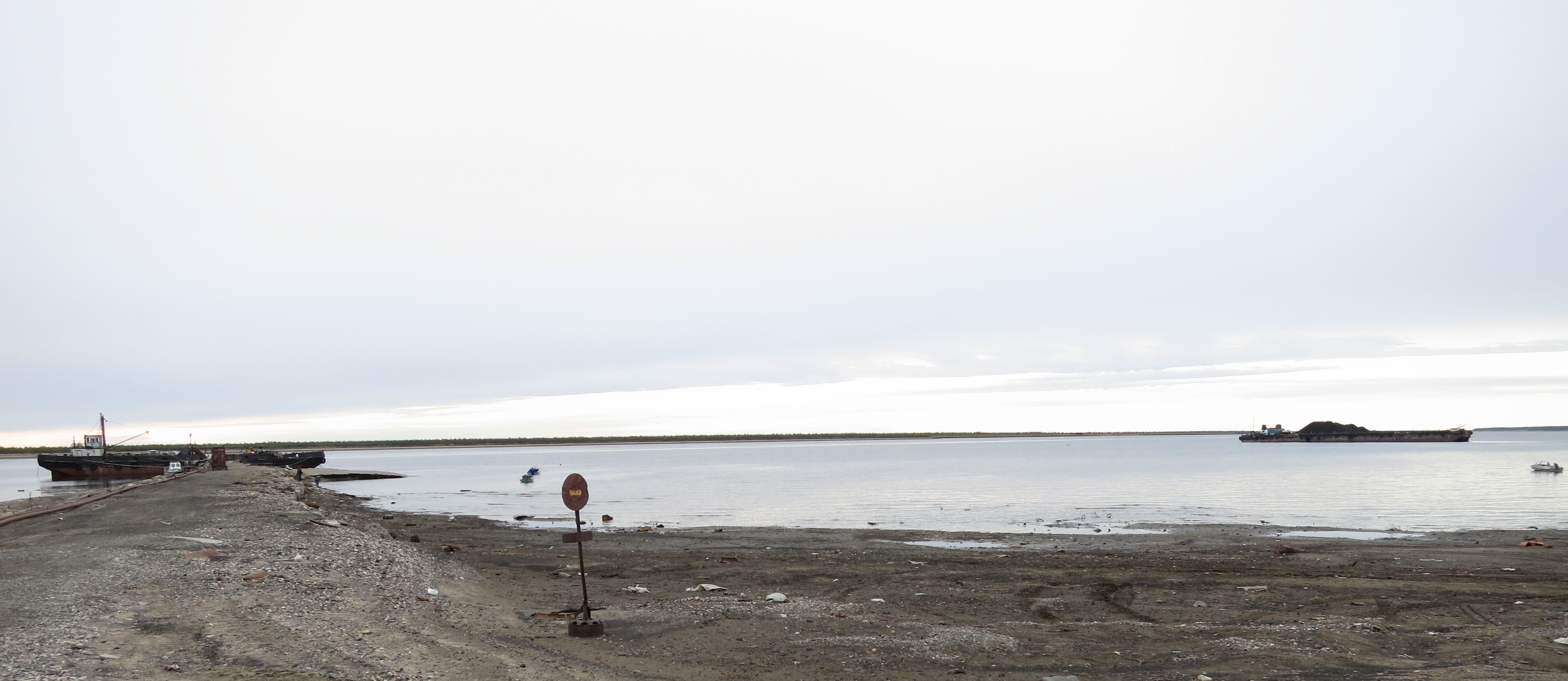

- Mouth location in Krasnoyarsk Krai, Russia Khatanga (river) (Russia)

Location
- Country: Russia

Physical characteristics
- Source: confluence of Kotuy and Kheta
- Mouth: Laptev Sea
  - coordinates: 73°11′14″N 106°12′25″E
- Length: 227 km (141 mi) (Khatanga–Kotuy 1,636 km (1,017 mi)
- Basin size: 364,000 km^{2} (141,000 mi^{2})
- Discharge
  - location: Near mouth
  - average: (Period: 1984–2018)102 km^{3}/a (3,200 m^{3}/s)

Basin features
- Progression: Laptev Sea
- River system: Khatanga River
- Tributaries
  - left: Kheta, Novaya, Malaya Balakhnya
  - right: Kotuy, Nizhnyaya, Bludnaya, Popigay

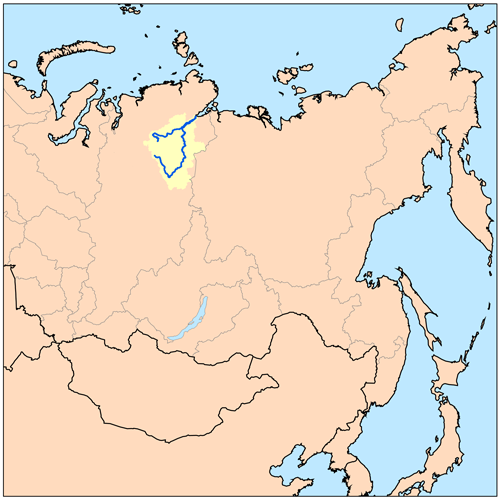
Map of the Khatanga drainage basin, including the Kheta (to the north) and Kotuy (to the south)

The Khatanga (Russian: Хатанга) is a river in Krasnoyarsk Krai in Russia. The river is navigable. The river port of Khatanga is located on the river.

== Course ==
It begins at the confluence of the rivers Kotuy and Kheta. The Khatanga is 227 km (141 mi) long (1,636 km (1,017 mi) including its headwater Kotuy); the area of its basin is 364,000 km^{2} (141,000 mi^{2}). It flows into the Khatanga Gulf of the Laptev Sea, forming an estuary. There are more than 112,000 lakes, with a total surface area of 11,600 square kilometres (4,500 mi^{2}), in the basin of the river.

The Khatanga freezes up in late September–early October and breaks up in early June. Its main tributaries are the Nizhnyaya, Bludnaya, Popigay, Novaya, and Malaya Balakhnya.

== Fauna ==
The Khatanga teems with different kinds of fish, including ryapushka, omul, muksun, white salmon, taimen, loach, among others.

== History ==
Russian fur traders first reached the Khatanga about 1611.

== See also ==
- List of largest unfragmented rivers
- Katanga, name for the upper course of the river Podkamennaya Tunguska
