= Volodarsky (ship) =

Soviet steamship

- Volodarsky, a pre–World War II photo

History

Soviet Union
- Name: Tovarishch Volodarsky; Volodarsky
- Namesake: V. Volodarsky
- Operator: (Soviet Union) Murmansk Shipping Company
- Builder: Baltic Shipyard, Leningrad
- Laid down: 1927
- Launched: November 1928
- In service: 1929
- Out of service: August 1941
- Fate: Commissioned by the Northern Fleet

Soviet Union
- Name: Volodarsky
- Operator: (Soviet Union) Northern Fleet
- Commissioned: August 1941
- Decommissioned: 1945
- Reclassified: Liquid cargo barge, October 1941
- Fate: Returned to the Murmansk Shipping Company

Soviet Union
- Name: Volodarsky
- Operator: (Soviet Union) Murmansk Shipping Company
- In service: 1945
- Out of service: 26 December 1991
- Reclassified: Nuclear-powered icebreaker depot ship, 1969; Nuclear waste carrier, 1991
- Fate: Transferred to Russia

Russia
- Name: Volodarsky
- Operator: (Russia) Murmansk Shipping Company
- In service: 26 December 1991
- Out of service: 1998
- Identification: IMO number: 5383407
- Fate: Scrapped, 2014

General characteristics
- Class & type: Tovarishch Stalin-class timber carrier (III series)
- Tonnage: 3,760 t (3,700 long tons) DWT
- Displacement: 5,520 t (5,430 long tons; 6,080 short tons)
- Length: 91.3 m (299 ft 6 in)
- Beam: 13.1 m (43 ft 0 in)
- Depth: 6.9 m (22 ft 8 in)
- Installed power: 950 metric horsepower (940 ihp)
- Propulsion: Two Scotch marine boilers; One triple-expansion vertical steam engine; One shaft
- Speed: 9 kn (17 km/h; 10 mph)
- Range: 2,500 nmi (4,600 km; 2,900 mi)
- Capacity: 3,472 t (3,417 long tons; 3,827 short tons)
- Crew: 32

SS Volodarsky (Russian: Володарский) was a Soviet steamship, a timber carrier of the III series of Tovarishch Stalin-class ships, which was active in the Arctic during the 1930s and was later the oldest ship in the Murmansk Shipping Company fleet.

The ship was laid down as Tovarishch Volodarsky (Russian: Товарищ Володарский, lit. 'Comrade Volodarsky') but was renamed during building. She was named after V. Volodarsky (real name Moisey Markovich Goldshteyn), a Russian revolutionary and an early Soviet politician.

== History ==
=== First Lena Expedition ===
In 1933 Volodarsky took part in the first Soviet convoy to the mouth of the Lena, under Captain N. V. Smagin, along with steamers Pravda and Tovarishch Stalin. The convoy leader, Captain M. A. Sorokin, was on board Volodarsky. This convoy was led by icebreaker Krasin (Captain Ya. P. Legzdin).

On the way back, severe ice conditions in the Vilkitsky Strait (between Severnaya Zemlya and Cape Chelyuskin), forced the three freighters of the convoy to winter at Ostrov Samuila in the Komsomolskaya Pravda Islands. A shore station was built and a full scientific programme maintained all winter by leader scientist N. N. Urvantsev and his wife, Dr. Yelizaveta Urvantseva, the expedition's medical officer.

The three ships were released in the following year by Fyodor Litke after much effort to break a channel through the thick ice. Then Volodarsky headed to Tiksi to load coal in order to bunker the ships of the Second Lena Expedition.

=== Contemporary period ===
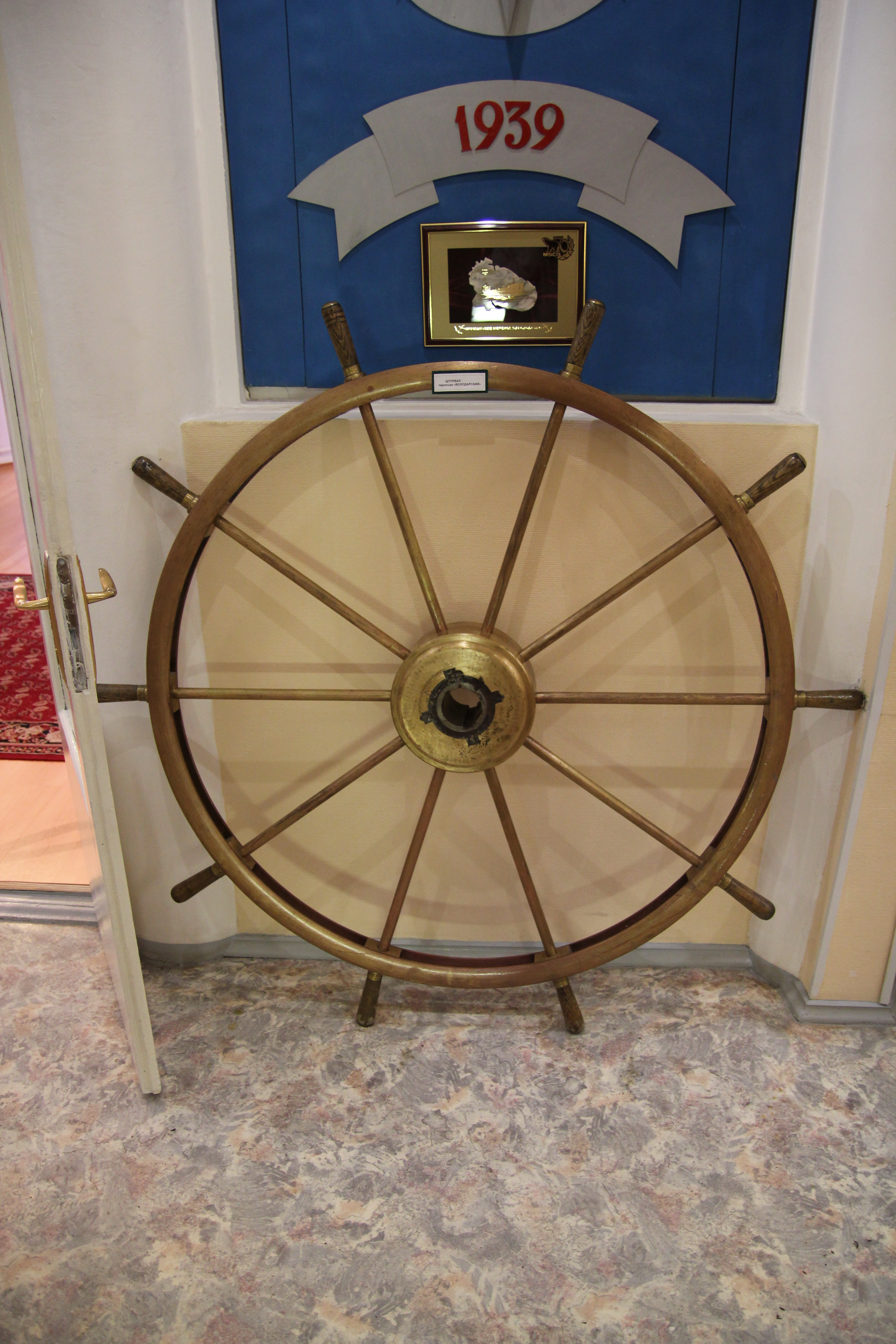
Volodarsky steamship's wheel, 2013

In 1969, Volodarsky was transferred to the Baza-92 Repair and Technological Enterprise (Russian: База-92, lit. 'Base-92'; renamed Atomflot in 1988) of the Murmansk Shipping Company.

According to some sources, the ship was reclassified as a nuclear-powered icebreaker depot ship after her conversion in 1968–1969. Then she was reclassified as a nuclear waste carrier in 1991.

According to other sources, until 1986 the ship was used to transport solid radioactive waste from Baza-92 (now Atomflot) to the west side of Novaya Zemlya for dumping into the Barents Sea. As of 1995, the ship had 14.5 tonnes (14.3 long tons; 16.0 short tons) of low- and medium-level waste stored aboard.

In 2014, the recycling of the Volodarsky nuclear waste carrier was completed.
