= Steamer Pravda =

History

Soviet Union
- Name: SS Pravda
- Namesake: Pravda
- Operator: (Soviet Union) Northern Shipping Company (until 1943 and since 1946); (Soviet Union) Far-Eastern Shipping Company (1943–1946)
- Builder: Baltic Shipyard, Leningrad
- Laid down: November 1925
- Launched: November 1926
- In service: 1928
- Out of service: 1964
- Fate: Scrapped

General characteristics
- Class & type: Tovarishch Stalin-class timber carrier (II series)
- Tonnage: 2,513 GRT; 3,732 t (3,673 long tons) DWT
- Displacement: 5,545 t (5,457 long tons; 6,112 short tons)
- Length: 92.0 m (301 ft 10 in)
- Beam: 13.1 m (43 ft 0 in)
- Draft: 6.27 m (20 ft 7 in)
- Depth: 6.9 m (22 ft 8 in)
- Installed power: 900 metric horsepower (890 ihp)
- Propulsion: Two Scotch marine boilers; One triple-expansion vertical steam engine; One shaft
- Speed: 9 kn (17 km/h; 10 mph)
- Range: 2,500 nmi (4,600 km; 2,900 mi)
- Capacity: 3,375 t (3,322 long tons; 3,720 short tons)
- Crew: 32

SS Pravda (Russian: Правда, lit. 'Truth') was a Soviet steamship, a timber carrier of the II series of Tovarishch Stalin-class ships, which was active in the Soviet Arctic during the 1930s. It was named after Soviet newspaper Pravda.

During World War II, SS Pravda was used for coastal and ocean shipping in the Soviet North and Far East, and was a member of Convoy QP 9 in March–April 1942.

== History ==
In 1933, the newly formed Chief Directorate of the Northern Sea Route sent Pravda, under Captain Kh. A. Belitskiy, to Nordvik on the first oil exploration expedition to Northern Siberia. This venture was led by N. N. Urvantsev who travelled on Pravda along with his wife, Dr. Yelizaveta Urvantseva, who was in charge of medical care. Pravda's cargo consisted of 2,430 tonnes (2,390 long tons; 2,680 short tons) of equipment and supplies for this important expedition, including four experimental NATI-2 half-track vehicles built by the Scientific Automotive and Tractor Institute in Moscow. These were the first tracked vehicles to be used in the Russian Arctic. They would be used to haul the drill, buildings and supplies, from the landing site to the drilling site. Apart from the detachable drill rig and a fully equipped drilling camp, Pravda also carried the rails, ties and rolling stock for a narrow-gauge railway.

Pravda travelled along with steamers Tovarishch Stalin and Volodarsky, which were on their way to the mouth of the Lena.

By 4 September Pravda was in the Khatanga Gulf, close to Nordvik. Captain Belitskiy had decided to approach Nordvik Bay from the east, between Poluostrov Paksa and Bolshoy Begichev Island. Despite having no knowledge of the depths in the channel Belitskiy went ahead, without taking the elementary precaution of sounding and Pravda ran aground in the centre of the channel two times.

Ice conditions in the Vilkitsky Strait (between Severnaya Zemlya and Cape Chelyuskin), forced the three freighters of the convoy to winter at Ostrov Samuila in the Komsomolskaya Pravda Islands. A shore station was built and a full scientific programme maintained all winter by Urvantsev and his wife Yelizaveta.

These ships were released in the following year by icebreaker Fyodor Litke. Feodor Litke made such a great effort to break a channel through the thick ice that it caused damage to its hull.

Once freed, Pravda proceeded to Pronchishcheva Bay to retrieve the fuel and boats she had had to jettison there, after which she sailed to Nordvik Bay, her initial destination.
