= Steamer Tovarishch Stalin =

Soviet freighter

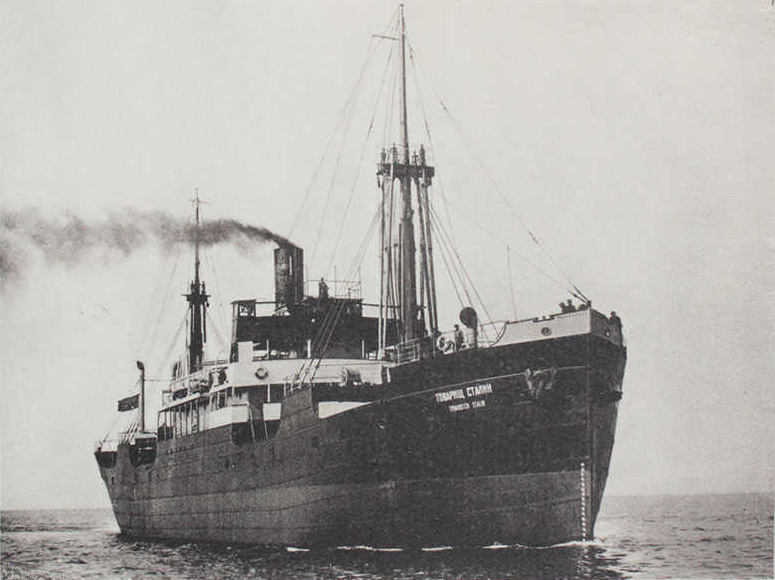

History

Soviet Union
- Name: Tovarishch Stalin
- Namesake: Joseph Stalin
- Operator: (Soviet Union) Sovtorgflot's Northern Main Directorate (1927–1934); (Soviet Union) Baltic Sea Shipping Company (1934–1940); (Soviet Union) Murmansk Shipping Company (1940–1941)
- Builder: Baltic Shipyard, Leningrad
- Laid down: 24 January 1925
- Launched: 25 October 1925
- In service: 31 August 1927
- Out of service: 9 October 1941
- Fate: Commissioned by the Northern Fleet

Soviet Union
- Name: Tovarishch Stalin
- Operator: (Soviet Union) Northern Fleet
- Commissioned: 9 October 1941
- Decommissioned: August 1945
- Reclassified: Liquid cargo barge, 1941
- Fate: Returned to the Murmansk Shipping Company

Soviet Union
- Name: Tovarishch Stalin
- Operator: (Soviet Union) Murmansk Shipping Company
- In service: August 1945
- Out of service: March 1954
- Fate: Scrapped

General characteristics
- Class & type: Tovarishch Stalin-class timber carrier (I series)
- Tonnage: 3,610 t (3,550 long tons) DWT
- Displacement: 5,280 t (5,200 long tons; 5,820 short tons)
- Length: 85.0 m (278 ft 10 in)
- Beam: 13.1 m (43 ft 0 in)
- Draft: 5.8–5.9 m (19 ft 0 in – 19 ft 4 in)
- Depth: 6.9 m (22 ft 8 in)
- Installed power: 900 metric horsepower (890 ihp)
- Propulsion: Two Scotch marine boilers; One triple-expansion vertical steam engine; One shaft
- Speed: 9 kn (17 km/h; 10 mph)
- Range: 2,500 nmi (4,600 km; 2,900 mi)
- Capacity: 3,230 t (3,180 long tons; 3,560 short tons)
- Crew: 32

SS Tovarishch Stalin (Russian: Товарищ Сталин, lit. 'Comrade Stalin') was a Soviet steamship, the class leader of her twenty-two-ship class of timber carriers. She was active in the Arctic during the 1930s.

SS Tovarishch Stalin and three other steamships—Mikhail Tomsky (Mironych after 1936), Grigory Zinoviev (Krasny Partizan after 1932), and Tovarishch Krasin (Altay after 1945)—were the I (first) series of Tovarishch Stalin-class timber carriers and first merchant ships built in the Soviet Union.

== History ==
In 1933 Tovarishch Stalin, under Captain Sergeyev, took part in the first Soviet convoy to the mouth of the Lena River along with the steamers Pravda and Volodarsky. The convoy leader, Captain M. A. Sorokin, was on board Volodarskiy. This convoy was led by the icebreaker Krasin (Captain Ya. P. Legzdin).

On the way back, severe ice conditions in the Vilkitsky Strait (between Severnaya Zemlya and Cape Chelyuskin), forced the three freighters to winter at Ostrov Samuila in the Komsomolskoy Pravdy Islands. A shore station was built and a full scientific programme maintained all winter by leader scientist Nikolay Urvantsev and his wife, Dr. Yelizaveta Urvantseva, the expedition's medical officer.

These ships were released in the following year by icebreaker Fyodor Litke after much effort to break a channel through the thick ice. Once freed, the freighters separated and Fyodor Litke escorted Tovarishch Stalin. Both headed west through the Vilkitsky Strait towards Arkhangelsk.
