= Fyodor Litke (1909 icebreaker) =

Soviet icebreaker

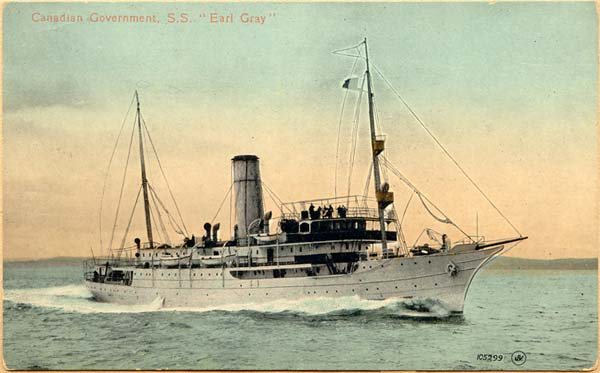
- Postcard version of photograph of Earl Grey while on builder's trials in 1909

History

Soviet Union
- Name: Фёдор Литке / Fyodor Litke
- Owner: Government of Canada (1910–1914); Russian Empire (1914–1917); Northern Sea Route (1932–1958)
- Builder: Vickers, Barrow-in-Furness
- Launched: 18 June 1909
- Out of service: August 1958
- Fate: Scrapped 1960

General characteristics
- Type: Icebreaking freighter
- Displacement: 4,850 tonnes
- Installed power: 7,000 hp (5,200 kW)
- Speed: 17 knots (31 km/h)

The icebreaker Fyodor Litke (SKR-18, Russian: Фёдор Литке, СКР-18) was active in the Soviet era in the Arctic, until the late 1950s. It was built in 1909 in England for the Saint Lawrence River service and initially named CGC Earl Grey after Albert Grey, Governor General of Canada. After four years in Canada it was sold to the Russian government and eventually renamed Fyodor Litke in honour of the Arctic explorer Fyodor Petrovich Litke.

Litke (Note: Name of the ship was usually reduced to Litke, omitting Fyodor.) became famous for its Arctic operations in 1932–1935, survived World War II and was retired in 1958 after nearly 50 years of service. Unlike conventional icebreakers that crush ice with their own weight from above, Litke belonged to an older generation of vessels, relying on ramming and cutting ice without any downward movement. For this reason, Litke was uniquely classified as an ice-cutter (Russian: ледорез) or icebreaking steamship (Russian: ледокольный пароход), rather than a true icebreaker.

== History ==
=== CGS Earl Grey ===
Albert Grey, the ninth Governor General of Canada, paid his first visit to the Hudson Bay area in 1910, returning home in a luxuriously-appointed suite on board an icebreaker bearing his name, CGS Earl Grey. Grey was interested in the construction of a coastal railroad, establishing new seaports (including Port Nelson) and charting the waters of Hudson Bay.

CGS Earl Grey was built in 1909 in Barrow-in-Furness for the Saint Lawrence River winter service as an "icebreaking freight and passenger steamer". Its engine was just 30% less powerful than the engine of Yermak, the largest true icebreaker of the period, although Yermak was slower due to a bulky ice-crushing layout. Earl Grey was equipped with a clipper style Stanley bow, giving it a yacht-like appearance and its owners claimed it to be the "First Canadian ice fighting machine". Later Russian crew members praised its living quarter luxuries but scorned the substandard shower room. The ship also rolled excessively, even on relatively calm seas.

=== Canada and the Russian Civil War ===
Earl Grey continued service between Charlottetown and Pictou until the outbreak of World War I. In 1914 she was sold to the Imperial Russian government and renamed Canada, operating in the Arkhangelsk area from 9 October 1914. Canada and another Canadian icebreaker, Lintrose (Sadko in Russian service) were key in extending the navigation season around Murmansk in 1914 to the end of January 1915, escorting a total of 146 British transports with military supplies.

In 1918–1920, during the Russian Civil War, when General Evgenii Miller controlled Arkhangelsk, Canada remained in port, loyal to Miller's government. However, on 19 February 1920, when a defeated Miller was evacuating the city, Canada and Ivan Susanin refused to cooperate with the white forces and stayed in Solombala harbor.

Canada, now in the hands of local commissars who were leaning towards the Bolsheviks, was armed and sailed out to sea, becoming trapped in ice after chasing and intercepting a convoy on the morning of 21 February. An artillery duel between Canada and Miller's icebreaker Kozma Minin was probably the only sea battle ever to take place between icebreakers and ended in favor of Miller. Canada retreated due to hull damage and the Bolsheviks blamed the failure on commissars Petrov and Nikolayev, who could have negotiated with the fugitives.

=== Fyodor Litke ===
The new Bolshevik owners changed the name of Canada to III International and eventually to Fyodor Litke – after Fyodor Petrovich Litke, the notable Arctic explorer, geographer, and tutor of Grand Duke Konstantin Nikolayevich of Russia.

==== 1929 expedition ====
In 1926, a team of Soviet explorers equipped with three years of supplies landed on Wrangel Island. The clear waters which had facilitated the 1926 landing were followed by years of continuous heavy ice. Attempts to reach Wrangel Island by sea failed and it was feared that the team would not survive their fourth winter.

In 1929 Litke, as one of the most capable Soviet icebreakers, was chosen for a rescue operation. The vessel sailed from Sevastopol with captain Konstantin Dublitsky in command, reaching Vladivostok on 4 July 1929. In Vladivostok, all the Black Sea sailors were relieved and replaced with local crew. Ten days later Litke sailed to the North, passed through the Bering Strait safely and attempted to pass Long Strait in order to approach the island from the south. On 8 August a scout plane reported seeing impassable ice in the strait, and Litke turned north, heading to Herald Island. It failed to escape the mounting ice and on 12 August the captain shut down the engines in order to save coal and had to wait two weeks until ice pressure eased up. Making only a few hundred meters a day, Litke reached the settlement on 28 August. On 5 September, Litke went to sea once more, bringing all the 'islanders' to safety. This operation earned Litke the order of the Red Banner of Labour (20 January 1930), as well as memorial badges for the crew.

==== 1932: First Dalstroy campaign ====
From 1932 until 1933 Litke was employed by Dalstroy, which was an NKVD organization in charge of Far Eastern gold mining. The gold mines were separated from Magadan Harbor by virtually impassable mountains; however, the mines could be reached from the Arctic coast of Chukchi Sea by river – if the ships managed to break through from Bering Strait to Kolyma River inlet. On 23 January 1932, the government assigned Litke and a smaller icebreaker, Davydov, to guide Arctic convoys with over 13,000 tonnes of supplies, over 1,000 passengers and numerous small river craft, to the Kolyma settlements. The plan also considered the possibility that the ships would be trapped in the ice for the winter of 1932–1933, and they were supplied sufficiently to survive 14 months. Formation of the first convoy was delayed owing to the lack of Arctic-ready transport ships that had to be assembled from the Black Sea and Baltic Sea fleets, or built at the Dalzavod yards in Vladivostok.

Ships of the first large convoy – Litke, six transport ships and a motor schooner, towing 26 smaller craft and carrying 867 passengers, most of them convicts, – sailed from Vladivostok individually between 27 June and 5 July 1932. Litke, under the command of captain Nikolay Nikolayev, sailed on 2 July. Due to delays in Vladivostok, the convoy missed the optimal, calm period (June) and faced heavy storms in the Sea of Okhotsk. Two 500-tonne welded barges towed by Litke suffered hull cracks as early in the voyage as the La Perouse Strait and had to be repaired in rough seas. Litke arrived in Petropavlovsk on 10 July, making an average 7 knots (13 km/h) with only four out of its six boilers working. (Note: Four out of six boilers were normally used in clear water. Five or six were used in heavy ice only.) In the following week it resupplied from a Japanese coaler, taking special precautions to block any contacts between Soviet and Japanese crews. The sailing to Provideniya (18–26 July) was uneventful, except for a minor storm off Cape Olutorsky, once again damaging the barges.

While the convoy assembled in a formation off Cape Dezhnev, two larger transports, Anadyr and Suchan, attempted to head west to Kolyma on their own. They were stopped by heavy ice; Litke released them on 31 July and immediately returned to Cape Dezhnev. Most of August was spent seeking ice-free westward passages. With scout planes grounded by bad weather until 15 August, the ships moved by trial and error around impassable ice formations. Litke, with half of the transports, headed west, making 12 to 25 miles (19 to 40 km) a day; the other transports were relieved from a possibly fatal attempt for them.

The convoy reached Ambarchik Bay (Kolyma inlet) on 4 September. Ambarchik became the main "port of entry" for the prisoners of Kolyma for the next decade. A P Bochek, the leader of the expedition, cited the efforts of Litke as the main factor in the operation's success. However, the convoy ultimately failed to unload its cargo – 18 out of the 20 days in Ambarchik anchorage were stormy, so 5,980 of the 10,890 tonnes of cargo were left in the holds. Thus it was decided to relocate the transports to a safe winter anchorage in Chaunskaya Bay; however the short journey was plagued by increasingly heavier ice that damaged Litke's rudder on 26 September. Divers confirmed that the damage could be fixed only in a dry dock. Litke could now only sail accompanied by a tugboat.

Between 2–7 October, the crippled Litke was busy clearing a passage to Uritsky off Cape Shelagsky. Fearing that Litke itself would be trapped away from the convoy, Bochek and his staff ordered that it cease its efforts. Litke joined the main forces in Chaun Bay, preparing to stay there for the long Arctic winter. On 31 October, Litke was fully prepared for the winter; it still carried 500 tonnes of coal, with 150 allocated for heating at the anchorage. Its large luxurious saloons were used for propaganda and entertainment assemblies for the whole convoy. Meanwhile, the morale of its crew was plummeting. The ship surgeon and cook were relieved from duty for absenteeism.

==== 1933: Chelyuskin disaster ====
After a winter in Chaun bay, Litke was declared seaworthy again on 20 June 1933. On 28 June, Litke assisted two transports, beached by a storm, and on 1 July sailed once more to attempt to release Uritsky from the ice. On this occasion Litke carried 450 tonnes of coal – enough to last for seven days in heavy ice. To save fuel, she moved in a start-stop manner, shutting down her boilers for days on end when ice density or fog forced her to idle. On 18 July Litke finally approached Uritsky and both ships safely reached Kolyma Inlet on 21 July. Meanwhile, the fleet in Chaun Bay finally unloaded their cargoes and on 16 August, Litke, along with Anadyr, sailed to Vladivostok, picking up other stranded ships on their way. The short run to the Bering Strait was a hazardous operation, and numerous ships again became trapped in the ice with fuel running low. As the coastal ice grew heavier, the convoy had to turn north, and reached Vankarem only on 13 September. Later in September, the convoy, in small isolated groups, was stuck in coastal ice east of Vankarem. Litke, the only icebreaker in the Chukotka area, managed to get them through, but sustained wear and damage from the ice was gradually reducing her capability.

At the same time SS Chelyuskin, attempting a single-season passage from Murmansk to Vladivostok, was stuck in ice in the same area, off Cape Koluchin. On 22 September, while attempting to clear a passage for three ships trapped in the ice, Litke again damaged its rudder and propeller, hardly escaping entrapment in the ice itself, and had to retreat to clear water in Provideniya bay. In the middle of October, Cheluskin was firmly trapped in solid pack ice and drifting westward through the Chukchi Sea. Litke, protecting a far larger convoy, had to complete her mission at the cost of leaving Cheluskin alone in the Arctic.

On 10 October, Litke reached Cape Dezhnev in clear water, but the next day ice floes pushed it back, westward. Two transports, Schmidt and Sverdlovsk, were nearly crushed by the ice and had to be rescued at all costs. When Litke reached Cape Dezhnev again on 14 October, she suffered multiple hull cracks, a damaged rudder, lost propeller blades and most importantly, her right shaft was warped to the point that it rendered the right engine useless. At half power, Litke could not break through thick ice and had to retreat to Provideniya. On 26 October Sverdlovsk and Schmidt managed to break through and all three ships arrived in Providenya on 2 November. Meanwhile, Cheluskin, drifting in the pack ice off Cape Dezhnev, became the subject of a massive propaganda campaign and its rescue became a national emergency.

On 5 November, Litke, still crippled, offered help by radio. Otto Schmidt, aware of Litke's condition, at first declined the offer. Five days later, however, a desperate Schmidt himself radioed Litke for help, hoping that an icebreaker and explosive blasting could clear a passage through three-quarters of a mile of thick ice. Litke put to sea without a proper refit and in the next few days she was damaged to the point when the captain considered beaching her onto the Alaska coast to save his own crew. Schmidt let Litke abort her mission on 17 November, when the two ships were separated by 30 miles (48 km). Litke, assisting Smolensk and other transports south of Bering Strait, reached Petropavlovsk on 14 December, and after two weeks of makeshift repairs, finally sailed to Vladivostok for an overhaul, arriving there on 4 January 1934.

Litke was refitted in Japan while Cheluskin sank in February 1934, crushed by the ice it had been trapped in. Contemporary authors directly link Litke's failure in November 1933 to the wear and damage it had sustained after two Dalstroy seasons.

==== 1934 expedition ====
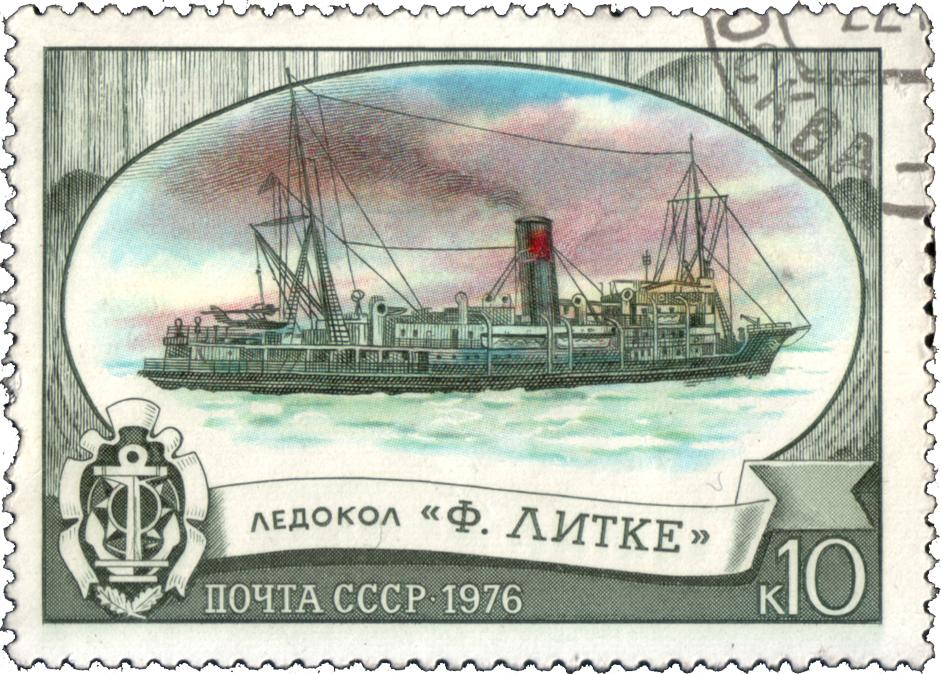
Litke on a 1976 Soviet postage stamp. Here it is named an icebreaker although in 1930s it was classified as ice-cutter due to a clipper bow design.

In 1934, the icebreaker Fyodor Litke became a Soviet propaganda icon as the first vessel to pass the complete Northern Sea Route, east to west, in one season. In the following season it escorted the first freighters to make the passage in the opposite direction. Since then, hundreds of vessels have completed the passage in both directions.

This time, captain Dublitsky was in overall charge of the convoy, with captain Nikolay Nikolaev in command of the ship and professor Vladimir Wiese in charge of the scientific programme. Litke sailed from Vladivostok on 28 June 1934 and passed the Bering Strait on the morning of 13 July. She was considerably delayed by ice at the Long Strait but on 2 August she was able to enter the Laptev Sea.

As she approached the Taymyr coast, Litke again encountered ice. By the evening of 11 August, whilst she was manoeuvering among heavy floes, Litke spotted the masts and funnels of three trapped ships close to the Komsomolskaya Pravda Islands. These were the Pravda, Volodarskiy and Tovarich Stalin. They appeared dead ahead, separated from Litke by 10 kilometers (6.2 mi) of solid sea ice. After a week of breaking through the ice, Litke succeeded in rescuing the freighters at the cost of major damage to the structure of her hull. The freed freighters went their separate ways: Stalin followed Litke west to Arkhangelsk via Vilkitsky Strait while Volodarskiy headed east towards the mouths of the Lena and Pravda southwards to Nordvik.

Dublitsky, Nikolayev and Wiese received a welcoming address from Joseph Stalin on 23 September 1934 and became public celebrities.

==== 1935–1938 ====
In 1935, Litke escorted two transports, Vantzetti and Iskra, through the Northern Route west to east. They sailed from Leningrad on 8 July and arrived at Vladivostok on 8 October 1935. At the same time Anadyr and Stalingrad made the east-to-west journey, reaching Leningrad on 16 October. Rabochiy made a near-double trip from Arkhangelsk to Kolyma and back.

In 1936, Litke was temporarily relieved from NKVD duties. Litke, under the command of captain Yury Khlebnikov and the overall management of Otto Schmidt, completed a purely military operation – clearing the Arctic passage for the destroyers Stalin and Voykov, dispatched from Kronstadt via the Northern Route to join the Pacific Fleet. Litke, sailing from Arkhangelsk, reached Novaya Zemlya on 1 August. Here, the convoy picked up more transports and oil tankers and the destroyers reached Vladivostok in October 1936. The operation nearly ended in a disaster when the oil-powered destroyers ran short of fuel in stormy weather in the Sea of Okhotsk. Mechanics managed to burn wheat flour to maintain minimum boiler pressure. Meanwhile, in the season of 1936, as many as 16 ships traversed the Northern Route.

The season of 1937 was intended to be far more successful than past seasons in terms of the tonnage and number of ships making the Arctic passage; however, many of the ships attempting it were not fully suited to Arctic conditions. Two convoys, led by Litke and Lenin, as well as Krasin, scrambled to rescue them and were trapped in the ice themselves, off Khatanga Gulf, for the winter. Through bad planning, weather and bad luck, 25 of the 64 ships underway on the Northern Route in 1937 were out of action – at least until next spring; one, Rabochiy, was lost. Only in April 1938 did Krasin, resupplied from the coastal coal dumps, break through and release Litke and its transports. The failures of 1937 were used as a pretext for replacing the Northern Sea Route management, and at least 673 men fell victims to the Great Purge. The Glavsevmorput was limited to maintaining coastal navigation, its auxiliary function relegated to Dalstroy and other organizations.

==== 1941–1945: World War II ====
In the late summer of 1941 during World War II, Litke was armed with artillery at Severodvinsk shipyard No. 402, acquired the frigate pennant number SKR-18 and was assigned to the newly formed Northern Unit of the White Sea Flotilla. Litke served the rest of 1941 in its principal function, guiding Arctic convoys in the Eastern sector (from the White Sea to Dudinka). In the winter of 1941–1942 it cleared the frozen approaches to Arkhangelsk for the Atlantic convoys. This seasonal work pattern – deep Arctic in summer, White Sea in winter, two refits at shipyard No. 402 – continued throughout the war. Sailing in the western Arctic could be as dangerous as in the Far East; for example, in February 1942 Litke failed to clear a passage to Indiga Bay and its convoy had to return to Iokanga, making it vulnerable to German air and submarine attacks.

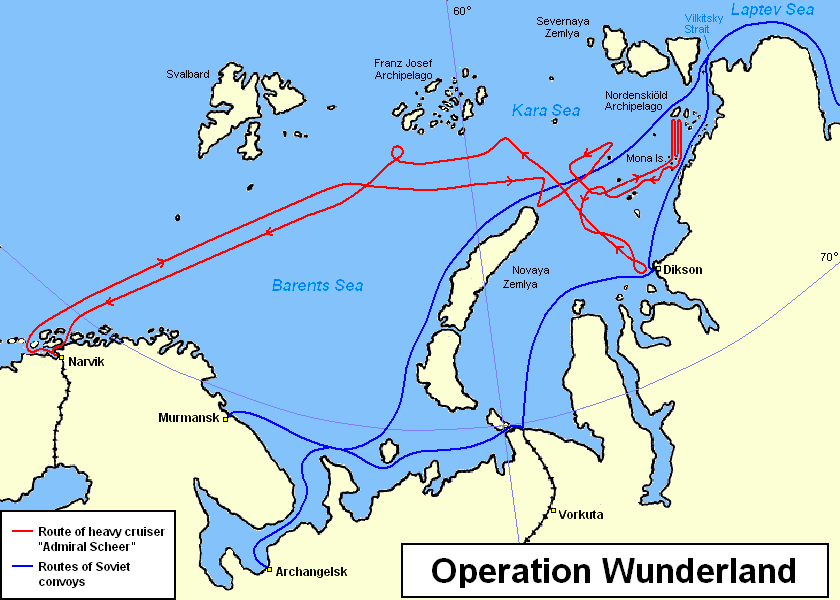
Map of Operation Wunderland showing extent of German presence in the Arctic

During Operation Wunderland, on 20 August 1942, the German submarine U-456 (Lt. Captain Teichert) tried to sink Litke off Belushya Guba in the Barents Sea by firing torpedoes at it, but was unsuccessful. On 26 August the German heavy cruiser Admiral Scheer succeeded in destroying the coal dump in Dikson. Litke and the icebreaker Taimyr were summoned to lead an emergency convoy of coal barges, saving the town from extinction.

In the same summer of 1943 the icebreaker Joseph Stalin, recently refitted in Seattle, escorted three transports from the United States to Tiksi. Here, Litke awaited the arrival of this convoy which would double Joseph Stalin's ice-breaking capacity. However, the threat of German submarines and bottom mines scattered in the shallow coastal passage caused a delay until the Navy could assemble an adequate defensive escort.

Two transports of VA-18 convoy – standing for Vilkitsky Strait to Arkhangelsk – Arkhangelsk and Kirov, and a minesweeper, were destroyed by submarines in the Kara Sea on 30 September and 1 October. The surviving transports of VA-18 convoy were left behind in Dikson, but the Navy could not afford to leave the icebreakers there for the whole Arctic winter because they were needed in western ports to assist the Atlantic convoys. Despite an increasing submarine presence, Litke and Joseph Stalin sailed west from Tiksi to Arkhangelsk with a minesweeper escort, codenamed Convoy AB-66. (Note: AB acronym stands for Deep Arctic to White Sea) A deep sea route via Amderma and the Kara Strait was safe from bottom mines, but at least 600 nautical miles (1,100 km) of the 1,100-nautical-mile (2,000 km) journey was packed with 'young' ice, slowing down the convoy and consuming fuel (Litke sailed with only 900 tonnes of coal and 290 tonnes of water). The second leg of the journey was almost entirely in pack ice (eliminating the submarine threat).

On 11 November, AB-66 reached open water and was joined by a defensive destroyer escort (Convoy AB-55). Six more destroyers sailed from Arkhangelsk and Iokanga to protect AB-55 in home waters. On 16 November the destroyers intercepted a German submarine and sighted a Ju 88 bombers; both intruders were forced to abort their missions. Two more submarines were intercepted by the minesweepers and the convoy reached Severodvinsk without casualties on 18 November 1943. According to Soviet reports, the total count of AB-55 and AB-66 stands at two submarines sunk and two damaged. More importantly, Litke and Stalin proved the viability of extending polar navigation into October; their observation of young ice formation in October 1943 changed the previously held perception of the phenomenon.

==== Post-war service ====
In 1946–1947 Litke was refitted by Merseyside yards and continued Arctic exploration. Two campaigns (1948 and 1955) were completely dedicated to hydrographic studies of Arctic seas. In 1955, Litke set a world record by reaching 83°11', or only 440 nautical miles (810 km) from the North Pole "with normal propulsion and steering" and safely returning to her home port (Fram went even further, to 86°14' – but was completely trapped in ice and unable to turn back). The 1955 expedition was also notable for locating the deepest known point of the Arctic Ocean, named the Littke Depression (5,449 m (17,877 ft)), and drilling geological samples from the ocean floor.

After a long career, Litke was towed to the Murmansk scrapyard in August 1958 and broken up in 1960. She remained listed by Lloyd's Register until 1961.

== See also ==
- Litke Nunatak

== Bibliography ==
- (in English) Barr, W. The Drift of Lenin's Convoy in the Laptev Sea, 1937 – 1938. Arctic, v.33 no.1 (March 1980) p. 4–20
- (in English) Barr, W. The First Soviet Convoy to the Mouth of the Lena. Arctic, v.35 no.2 (June 1982) p. 317–325
- (in German) German Naval Warfare in 1942
- (in English) International Polar Year – Badges for Imperial Russian/Soviet Polar Exploration and Research
- (in Russian) Bochek, A. P. Report on the 1932–1933 navigation (Бочек, А. П. Начальника Северо-Восточной Полярной Экспедиции НАРКОМВОДА – БОЧЕК А.П. – доклад Народному комиссару водного транспорта Янсон Н. М. 1934 г. )
- (in Russian) Combat chronicles of the Russian Navy (Боевая летопись русского флота: Хроника важнейших событий военной истории русского флота с IX в. по 1917 г. – М.: Воениздат МВС СССР, 1948)
- (in Russian) Dremlyug, V. V. Naval logistics in the Arctic (1941–1945) (В. В. Дремлюг. Обеспечение морских операций в Арктике (1941–1945) / Конференция "Война в Арктике", г.Архангельск, август-сентябрь 2000.)
- (in Russian) Evseyev, V. V. Geological studies of the AANII (Евсеев, В.В. Горно-геологические исследования института. Arctic and Antarctic Institute)
- (in English) Fraser, R. J. Early Canadian Icebreakers. Arctic, v. 16, no. 1, Mar. 1963, p. 2-7, ill.
- (in Russian) History of World War I, vol.II (История первой мировой войны 1914–1918 гг. – М.: Наука, 1975, т.II)
- (in Russian) Larkov, S. Cheluskin: historical myths and objective history (Ларьков, С., Челюскинская эпопея: историческая мифология и объективность истории. / Земцов А. Н. (ред.)., Враги народа за полярным кругом. – М: ИНЕТ им. С. И. Вавилова, 2007. ISBN 978-5-98866-014-9)
- (in Russian) Larkov, S., Romamenko, F. Zakonvoirovannye zimovschiki (Ларьков, С., Романенко, Ф., Законвоированные зимовщики. / Земцов А. Н. (ред.)., Враги народа за полярным кругом. – М: ИНЕТ им. С. И. Вавилова, 2007. ISBN 978-5-98866-014-9

)

- (in English) McMurtrie, Francis E., and Blackman, Raymond V.B., Jane's Fighting Ships 1949-50. New York: McGraw-Hill Book Company, Inc., 1949
- (in Russian) Popov, G. P. Navy College to the War (Попов, Г. П. Из мореходки – на войну. / Ceверные конвои. Исследования, воспоминания, документы. – Архангельск: 1991 )
- (in Russian) Papanin, I. Ice and Fire (Папанин, И. Д., Лёд и пламень. – М: Политиздат, 1977 chapter 3
- (in Russian) Rudny, V. A. Maximum readiness (Рудный В.А. Готовность № 1 (О Кузнецове Н.Г.) – М.: Политиздат, 1982 )
- (in Russian) Schmigelsky, L. Molotovsk and the war in Arctic 1941–1945 (Шмигельский, Л. Молотовск и война в Арктике 1941–1945 / Конференция "Война в Арктике", г.Архангельск, август-сентябрь 2000.)
- (in Russian) Seliverstov, L. S. Pomorie to the Ocean (Селиверстов Л.С. Из Поморья – в океан : записки моряка.- Мурманск: 2005. ISBN 5-85510-293-9)
- (in Russian) 75 years of Northern Sea Route (75 лет Северному морскому пути. Пресс-релиз. ААНИИ, 21.02.2008. Arctic and Antarctic Institute)
- (in Russian) Smirnov, A. V. History of biological studies at the Arctic and Antarctic Institute (A. В. Смирнов. Исторический очерк биологических исследований, проводившихся Арктическим и Антарктическим научно-исследовательским институтом. ААНИИ, 2007. Arctic and Antarctic Institute)
- (in Russian) Smirnov, K. D. 1943 ice operation in the Arctic (К. Д. Смирнов. Крупная ледовая операция в 1943 году в Арктике )
- (in Russian) Sokolov, B. The fall of Northern Region (Борис Соколов. Падение Северной области. / Гражданская война в России: Война на Севере. – М: ООО «Издательство ACT». ISBN 5-17-024052-X)
- (in Russian) Stalin, J. S. Complete works, 2006 edition, v.18 (Cталин, И. В. Cочинения. – Т. 18. – Тверь: Информационно-издательский центр «Союз», 2006.)
