= Komsomolskaya Pravda Islands =

Coordinates: 77°20′00″N 107°00′00″E

Komsomolskaya Pravda Islands Острова Комсомольской Правды
- Island group
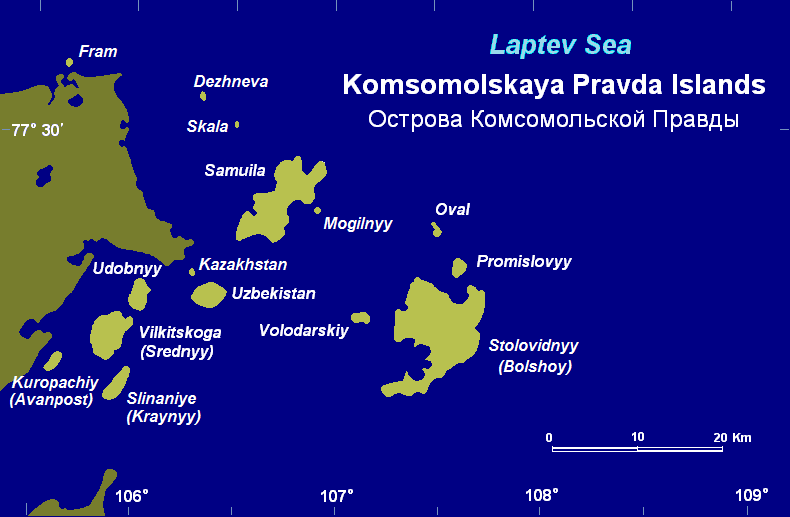
- Map of the archipelago.

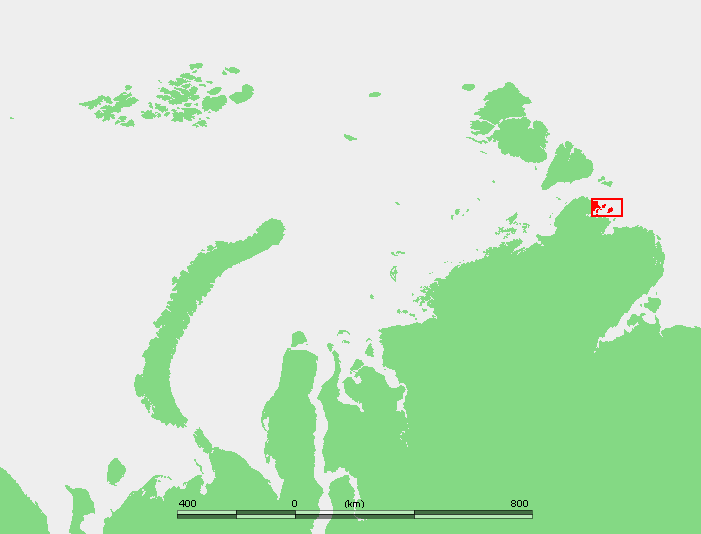
- Location of the Komsomolskaya Pravda Islands at the northeastern end of the Taymyr Peninsula
- Country: Russian Federation
- Federal subject: Krasnoyarsk Krai

The Komsomolskaya Pravda Islands (Russian: Острова Комсомольской Правды, Ostrova Komsomol'skoy Pravdy) are an archipelago in the far north of the Russian Federation. The islands are uninhabited and are covered with tundra vegetation, shingle and ice.

The climate in these islands and the surrounding waters is extremely severe with frequent gales and blizzards in the winter. The sea surrounding the archipelago is covered with fast ice most of the year and is obstructed by pack ice even in the summer.

== Etymology ==
The island group was known as Saint Samuel Islands (named after Samuel the Confessor) before the 1917 Russian Revolution and then they were renamed after Komsomolskaya Pravda, being for a while the only island group in the world named after a newspaper. This situation lasted only until the Izvesti Tsik Islands were given their name after newspaper Izvestia. The original name of the islands, "Samuila", was retained for one of the islands of the group though.

== Geography ==
These islands are located in the Laptev Sea coastal region, off the mouth of the Simsa Bay in the Taymyr Peninsula. This island group belongs to the Krasnoyarsk Krai administrative division of Russia.

The largest islands are Ostrov Samuila and Ostrov Bol'shoy (also known as Ostrov Stolovidnyy). Both of them belong to the offshore subgroup, which geographically is sometimes referred to as the proper Komsomolskaya Pravda Islands. The strait between these islands is known as Proliv Diksonskikh Gidrografov (Hydrographer Dikson Strait).

The smaller islands that are located close to the coast at the mouth of the Simsa Bay: Udobnyy, Vilkitsky (or Srednyy), Kraynyy (also known as Sliyaniye) and small Kuropachiy (known also as "Avanpost" and "Forpost"), form another subgroup that is also known as the Vilkitsky Islands (Ostrova Vil'kitskogo). These are named after geographer Boris Vilkitsky and should not be confused with the Vilkitski (or Dzhekman) Islands that are part of the Nordenskjold Archipelago or with other islands also called "Vilkitsky".

Uzbekistan Island, named after the former Uzbek Soviet Socialist Republic, has an intermediate position between the two subgroups of the Komsomolskaya Pravda Islands.

Just around the corner of the north east point of the nearby mainland lies small Fram Island (Остров Фрама; Ostrov Frama), which was named after Norwegian explorer Fridtjof Nansen's ship Fram.

== History ==
These islands were first reported in 1736 by Russian explorer Vasili Pronchishchev.

In 1933 the newly formed Glavsevmorput' (Chief Administration of the Northern Sea Route) dispatched the first convoy of freighters via the Northern Sea Route to the mouth of the Lena to deliver cargoes bound for the Yakut ASSR. It consisted of three freighters and was escorted by the icebreaker Krasin. Despite heavy ice conditions in the Kara Sea two of the ships reached Tiksi, their destination, and unloaded their cargoes. The third ship, Pravda was bound for Bukhta Nordvik with an oil exploration expedition. Despite warnings, Pravda ran aground near its destination and turned back.

Severe ice conditions in the Vilkitsky Strait (between Severnaya Zemlya and Cape Chelyuskin), forced the three freighters of the convoy, the Pravda, the Volodarskiy and the Tovarishch Stalin to winter at Ostrov Samuila in the Komsomolskaya Pravda Islands. A shore station was built and a full scientific programme maintained all winter by N. N. Urvantsev and his wife, Dr. Yelizaveta Ivanovna. Urvantsev used the base to explore the Taymyr Peninsula.

These ships were released in the following year by Icebreaker Feodor Litke. Battering heavily the ice around the Komsomolskaya Pravda Islands for one week, the Feodor Litke finally succeeded in breaking the freighters free after carving a 10 km channel with so much effort that its hull suffered grievous damage.

== See also ==
- Laptev Sea
- Vasili Pronchishchev
