= Faddey Islands =

Islands in Laptev Sea, Russia

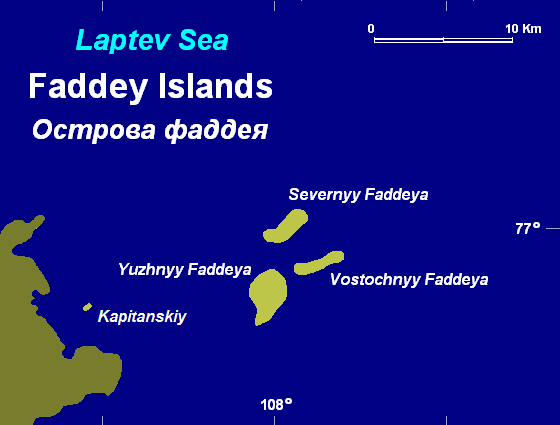
The Faddey Islands are located northeast of Faddey Bay

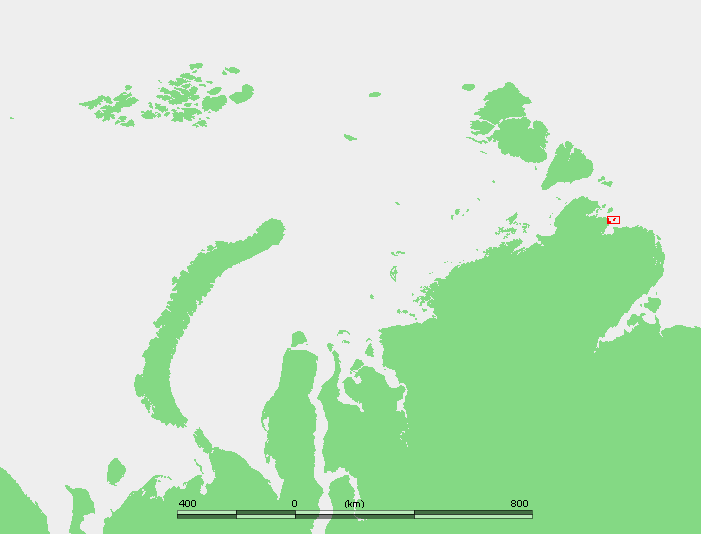
Location of the Faddey Islands northeast of the Taymyr Peninsula.

The Faddey Islands (Russian: Острова Фаддея; Ostrova Faddeya) is a group of islands in the Laptev Sea, Russia.

== Geography ==
The Faddey Islands group is located in the coastal region, off Faddey Bay (залив Фаддея) in the coast of Siberia, east of the Taymyr Peninsula. The Main islands are:

- Ostrov Faddeyya-Severnyy, coordinates 76°59′N 108°02′E.
- Ostrov Faddeyya-Vostochnyy, coordinates 76°58′N 108°07′E.
- Ostrov Faddeyya-Yuzhnyy, coordinates 76°56′N 107°58′E.
- Ostrov Kapitanskiy, a smaller island, located off the main cluster and closer to the shore, 76°56′N 107°27′E.

The islands are covered with tundra vegetation, shingle and ice. The sea around these Islands is covered with fast ice in the winter and the climate is severe. The surrounding sea is obstructed by pack ice even in the summer.

The Faddey Islands were named after Russian explorer Fabian Gottlieb von Bellingshausen, which is "Faddey Faddeyevich Bellinsgauzen" in Russian.

This island group belongs to the Krasnoyarsk Krai administrative division of Russia.

== History ==
Ancient stone implements, probably shaped by man, were found on the Faddey Islands and were studied by the Russian archaeologist A.P. Okladnikov, an expert in the ancient cultures of Siberia and the Pacific Basin.

In 1940-41 Soviet hydrographers found the remains of people, money, weapons and other items on these islands and in the nearby coast of the Simsa Bay. Apparently these were traces of an expedition undertaken by Akaky and Ivan Muromets in the early 17th century. A.P.Okladnikov, who studied these findings in 1945, supposed that the people went there from the west, from the Yenisei River (Historical monument…, 1945).

However, in the 1980s hydrographer V.A.Troitsky put forward a different theory. According to his point of view the deceased seafarers tried to sail by sea from the Khatanga Gulf to the mouth of the Yenisei on two ships in order to load furs (Troitsky, 1991). But the first ship was crushed by ice in the area of the Faddey Islands. Even though the crew were able to reach the land, none of them managed to survive. The second ship reached the Simsa Bay, where the crew built a house in order to leave three ill people there. Then the ship made its way to the south, and four people seem to have been able to reach populated places.

Since 1993 these islands are part of the Great Arctic State Nature Reserve, the largest nature reserve of Russia.

== See also ==
- Laptev Sea
- Vasili Pronchishchev
