= Preobrazheniya Island =

Island in Russia

Russian: Остров Преображения
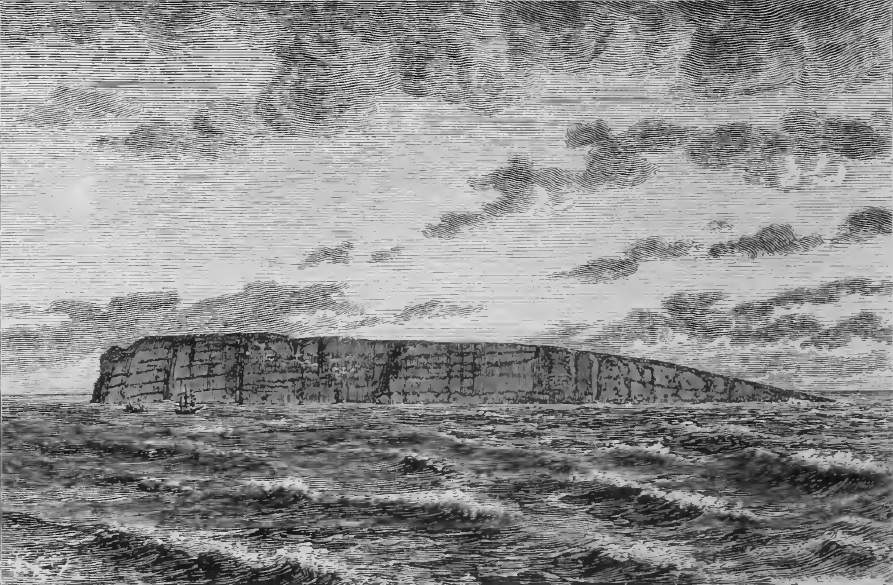
- View of the island.

- Location within Sakha Republic

Geography
- Location: Laptev Sea
- Coordinates: 74°40′N 112°56′E
- Area: 12 km^{2} (4.6 sq mi)
- Length: 7 km (4.3 mi)
- Width: 2.5 km (1.55 mi)
- Highest elevation: 77 m (253 ft)

Administration
- Russia

Preobrazheniya Island (Russian: Остров Преображения), meaning 'Transfiguration Island', is an island in the Laptev Sea, Russia.

== Geography ==
The island is elongated and small. It is situated off the Northern mouth of the Khatanga Gulf (Russian: Хатангский залив), 15 km north of Bolshoy Begichev Island.

Preobrazheniya Island is 7 km in length and its maximum width is 2,5 km. This island is granitic and has high rocky cliffs on its eastern side. The west side of the island is sloping to a gravel beach.

== History ==
This island was useful as a landmark for ships plying the Northern Sea Route in the past. It is also known as "Ostrov Vstrechnyy". There is an abandoned Polar research station on Preobrazheniya.

== Administration ==
For administrative purposes Preobrazheniya Island belongs to the Sakha (Yakutia) Republic of the Russian Federation.
