= Maly Begichev Island =

Island in the Laptev Sea, Russia

Coordinates: 74.2944°N 111.158°E

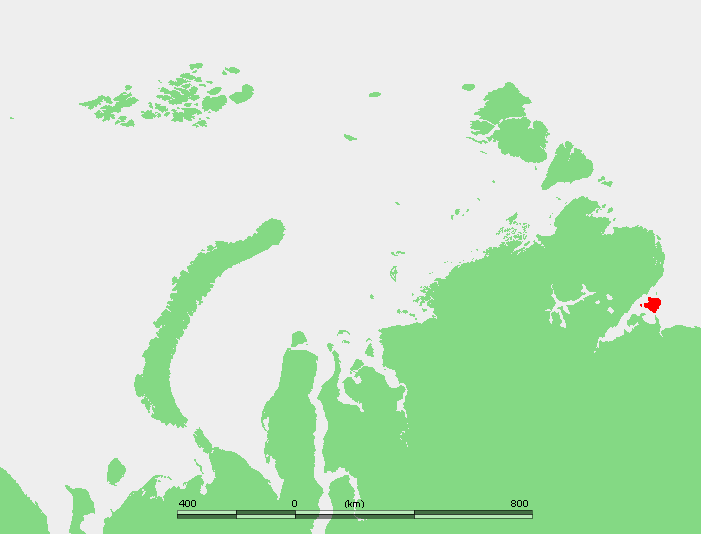
Location of Maly Begichev and Bolshoy Begichev islands in the Khatanga Gulf.

Maly Begichev (Russian: Малый Бегичев) is an island in the Laptev Sea, Russia. Its area is 15 km^{2}. This small island (maximum length 5.4 km) is situated within the Khatanga Gulf (Russian: Хатангский залив).

Only 8.5 km east of it lies the big island known as Bolshoy Begichev Island. Its size is much larger, with an area of 1764 km sq. The border between administrative divisions of the Russian Federation runs between the two Begichev islands, so that while Maly Begichev is in Krasnoyarsk Krai, Bolshoy Begichev is in the Sakha Republic.

Both islands are named after Russian polar explorer Nikifor Begichev.
