= Vilkitsky =

Vilkitsky may refer to any of the following:

People

- Andrey Vilkitsky (1858–1913), a Russian Arctic explorer
- Boris Vilkitsky (1885–1961), a Russian Arctic explorer, son of above

Places

- The Vilkitsky Strait, a strait in the Severnaya Zemlya archipelago.
- The Vilkitsky Islands in the Nordenskiöld Archipelago in the eastern region of the Kara Sea
- The Vilkitsky Island (Kara Sea) in the southern areas of the Kara Sea
- The Vilkitsky Island (East Siberian Sea) of the De Long Islands, in the East Siberian Sea
- The Vilkitsky island subgroup and its main island, the Vilkitsky Island, of the Komsomolskaya Pravda Islands in the Laptev Sea
