= Simsa Bay =

- Залив Симса (Russian)
- Map showing the location of the Simsa Bay

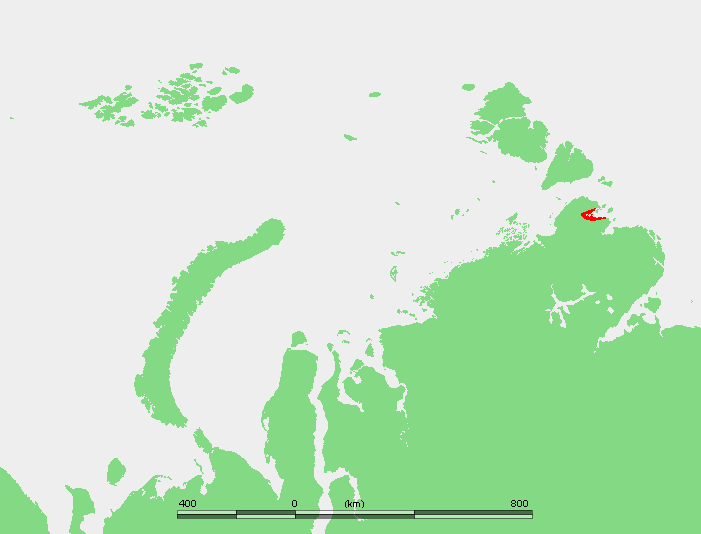
- Location: Far North
- Coordinates: 77°07′N 105°15′E
- River sources: Gol'tsovaya River
- Ocean/sea sources: Laptev Sea
- Basin countries: Russia
- Max. length: 40 km (25 mi)
- Max. width: 14 km (8.7 mi)

The Simsa Bay or Bay of Sims (Russian: Залив Симса; Zaliv Simsa) is a gulf in the Laptev Sea on the coast of the Taymyr Peninsula.

== Geography ==
The bay measures about 40 km from the mouth of the Gol'tsovaya River in the west to its broadest opening to the sea in the east. Its average width is 14 km.

The cluster of islands deep inside the bay is known as Ostrova Zalivnyye 77°05′N 104°21′E. The largest island is 4 km in length.

Owing to its extreme northerly location, the climate in the area of the Simsa Bay is exceptionally severe, with prolonged, bitter winters. This gulf is covered by ice most of the year, sometimes remaining frozen even in the brief summer period.

The Komsomolskaya Pravda Islands lie off the Simsa Bay's mouth.

Simsa Bay, Zaliv Simsa, should not be confused with Simskaya Bay, Bukhta Simskaya, an inlet on the right side of the Khatanga Gulf.

=== Administration ===
For administrative purposes the Simsa Bay belongs to the Krasnoyarsk Krai of the Russian Federation.

== History ==
In 1940-41 Soviet hydrographers found the remains of people, money, weapons and other items in the Simsa Bay and in the nearby Faddey Islands. Apparently these were traces of an expedition undertaken by certain Akakiy and Ivan Muromets in the early 17th century. The academician A.P. Okladnikov, an expert in the ancient cultures of Siberia and the Pacific Basin, studied these findings in 1945. He supposed that the people went there from the west, from the Yenisei River (Historical monument..., 1945).

However, in the 1980s hydrographer V. A. Troitsky put forward a different theory. According to his point of view the deceased seafarers tried to sail by sea from the Khatanga Gulf to the mouth of the Yenisei on two ships in order to load furs (Troitsky, 1991). But the first ship was crushed by ice in the area of the Faddey Islands. Even though the crew were able to reach the land, none of them managed to survive. The second ship reached the Simsa Bay, where the crew built a house in order to leave three ill people there. Then the ship made its way to the south, and four people seem to have been able to reach populated places.
