= Nordvik Bay =

Bight in Russia

- Бухта нордвик (Russian)
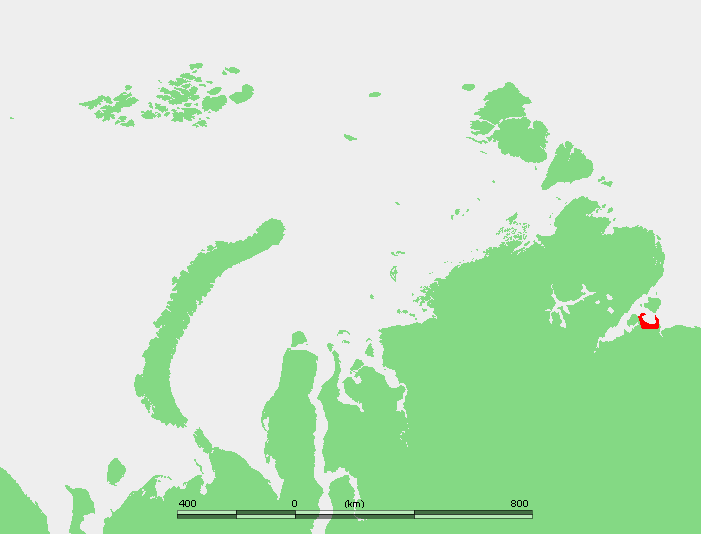
- Map showing the location of the Nordvik Bay

- Location within Sakha Republic
- Location: Far North
- Coordinates: 73.85°N 112.167°E
- Ocean/sea sources: Laptev Sea
- Basin countries: Russia

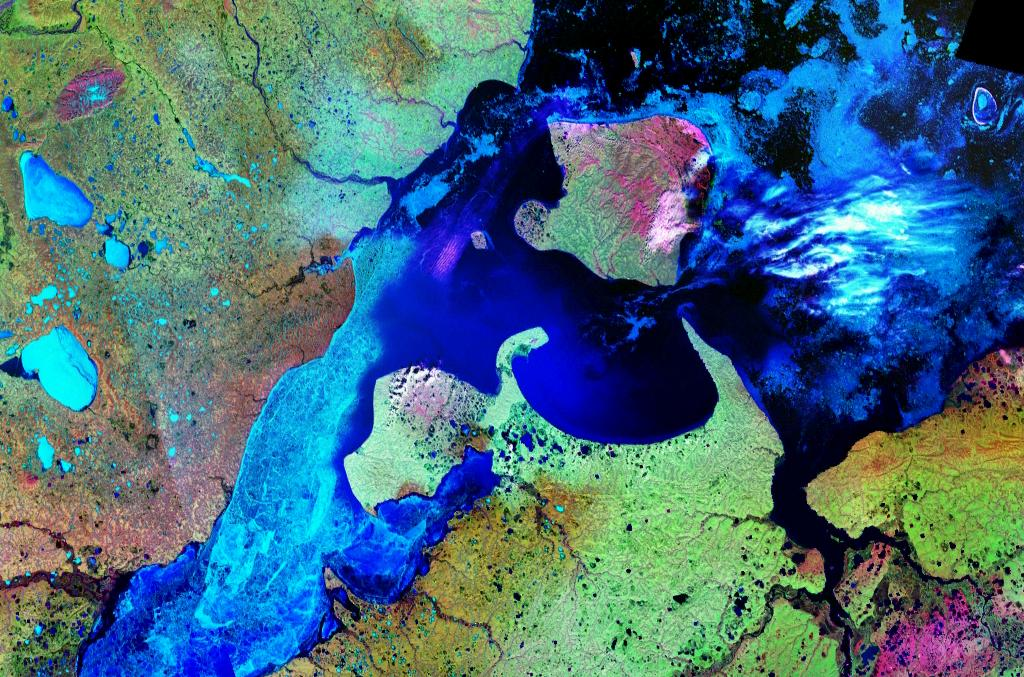
The bay of Nordvik (center) between the rivershed areas of the Khatanga River (left: Khatanga Gulf) and Anabar (right: Anabar Gulf). Bolshoy Begichev Island is located to the north.

Nordvik Bay (Russian: Бухта нордвик, romanized: Bukhta Nordvik; Yakut: Нордвик хомото, Nordvik xomoto) is a gulf in the Laptev Sea in the north of Russia. Lat 73° 45' and long 112°.

Nordvik Bay and most of its surrounding area belongs to the Sakha Republic administrative division of the Russian Federation.

== Geography ==
It is located Southeast of the mouth of the Khatanga Gulf, between two small peninsulas. The landspit in the west is the Uryung Tumus Peninsula, where there was formerly a village called Nordvik and an infamous penal colony that lies now deserted. The peninsula in the east is called Nordvik Peninsula, with Cape Paksa at its northern end, and on its eastern side lies the Anabar Bay.

Nordvik Bay is 39 km wide and it has a regular semicircular shape. It is quite shallow, its average depth being around 6 m. It is circled by lowlands and, since the climate in the area is exceptionally severe, with prolonged, bitter winters, Nordvik Bay is covered by ice most of the year.

== History ==
The name literally means "North Bay" in Norwegian. It was discovered and named by the Russian Great Northern Expedition in 1739.

During the 1930s this area experienced a limited boom owing to the first icebreaker convoys plying the Northern Sea Route. Tiksi Bay and Mys Schmidta had become airports and Nordvik was "a growing town."

== See also ==
- Arctic Ocean Hydrographic Expedition
- Russian Hydrographic Service
