= Litke Nunatak =

Mountain in Enderby Land, Antarctica

Litke Nunatak (67°36′S 51°40′E) is a nunatak 10 nautical miles (19 km) east of the Perov Nunataks, lying at the eastern margin of the Scott Mountains in Enderby Land, Antarctica. It was named by the Soviet Antarctic Expedition, 1961–62, after the Soviet icebreaker Litke.
