= Faddey Bay =

Bay of Laptev Sea

Coordinates: 76°36′N 107°25′E

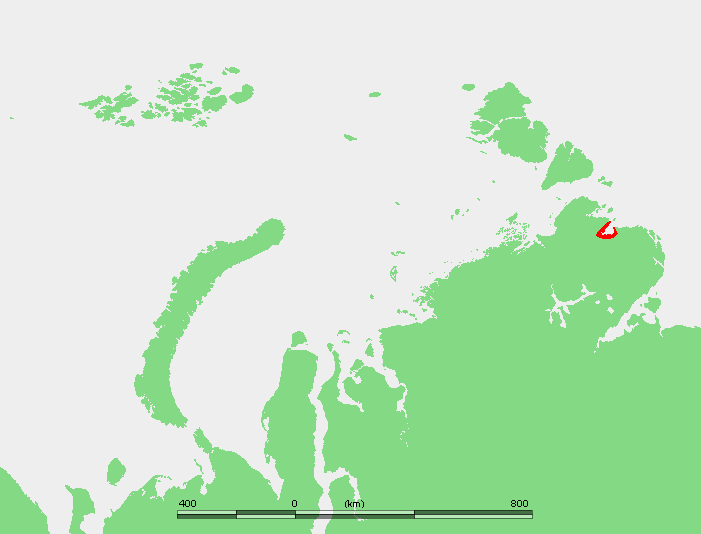
Map showing the location of Faddey Bay.

The Faddey Bay (Залив Фаддея; Zaliv Faddeya) is a gulf in the Laptev Sea on the eastern coast of the Taymyr Peninsula. It measures about 47 km from its innermost point in the southwest, the delta of the Pregradnaya River, to its broadest opening to the sea in the northeast. Its average width is 21 km.

Owing to its extreme northerly location, the climate in the area of the Faddey Bay is exceptionally severe, with prolonged, bitter winters. This gulf is covered by ice most of the year, sometimes remaining frozen even in the brief summer period.

The Faddey Islands lie to the north of the bay, right off its mouth. Both islands and the strait were named by Boris Vilkitsky's 1913 expedition after Russian explorer Fabian "Faddey" Gottlieb von Bellingshausen, the discoverer of Antarctica.

== History ==
The Faddey Bay was visited by Vasili Pronchishchev during his exploratory group of the Great Northern Expedition.

== Administration ==
For administrative purposes the Faddey Bay belongs to the Krasnoyarsk Krai of the Russian Federation.
