= Nikifor Begichev =

Russian seaman and polar explorer (1874–1927)

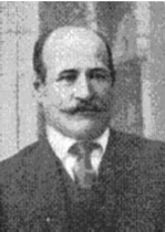
Nikifor Begichev

Nikifor Alekseevich Begichev (Bigichev) (Russian: Никифор Алексеевич Бегичев (Бигичев); 19 February [O.S. 7 February] 1874 – May 18, 1927) was a Russian and Soviet seaman and polar explorer. He was twice awarded gold medals by the Russian Academy of Sciences

== Biography ==
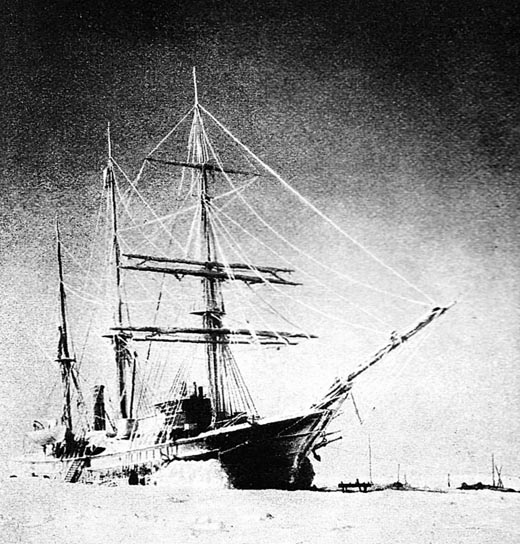
Polar ship Zarya wintering in the Arctic

Begichev was born in Tsariov, in Astrakhan Governorate, to a family of Volga River fishers. In 1895, he was called up to the service in the Russian Navy and traveled three times as a sailor and a boatswain to the Antilles islands.

He was a participant in the Russian polar expedition of 1900–1902 led by Eduard von Toll as the bosun of ship Zarya. After the death of Toll, Begichev took part in the research. During this voyage, he saved the life of his commander – lieutenant Aleksandr Kolchak, a future admiral. Walking by the sea ice, Kolchak fell in the split. When Begichev pulled him from the water, the lieutenant showed no signs of life. Begichev took off his dry clothes and dressed Kolchak with them. Then, to re-animate him, Begichev fired his pipe and put it in Kolchak's mouth. Kolchak opened his eyes.

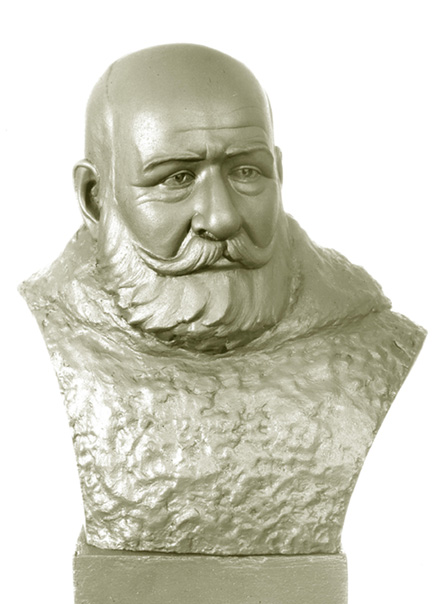
Nikifor Begichev

Later, Begichev took part in the Russo-Japanese War.

In 1922, at the request of the government of Norway, Begichev led an unsuccessful Soviet expedition to search for Peter Tessem and Paul Knutsen, lost crew members of the ship Maud from Roald Amundsen's 1918 expedition. Begichev was one of the researchers exploring the Taymyr Peninsula with Nikolay Urvantsev in 1923–1924. During his explorations, he surveyed two islands, which have been called after him: Bolshoy Begichev Island and Maliy Begichev Island.

Nikifor Begichev died during wintering at the mouth of the Pyasina River. In 1964, a monument to Begichev was erected in the settlement of Dikson.
