= Yakov Legzdin =

Soviet ship captain (1893–1954)

Yakov Petrovich Legzdin (Russian: Якoв Петрович Легздин (Екабс Бертольдс Легздиньш), Latvian: Jēkabs Legzdiņš,)) (September 25, 1893 — 1954, Leningrad, Soviet Union) — was the captain of the icebreaking ship Krasin from 1932 to 1933. He also captained the S. Makarov, Jakutija, and Papanin during the course of his career.

Legzdin was born on 25 September 1893 in Bolderāja, a suburb of Riga within the Russian Empire. He was the son of a Latvian fisherman, and after graduating from the local rural primary school, he attended a nautical school. In 1914, he was drafted into the Imperial Russian Navy during World War I.

A cape and gulf in the Barents Sea are named in honor of Legzdin.
