= Nordvik, Russia =

Human settlement in Taymyrsky Dolgano-Nenetsky District, Krasnoyarsk Krai, Russia

Coordinates: 74.0181°N 111.469°E

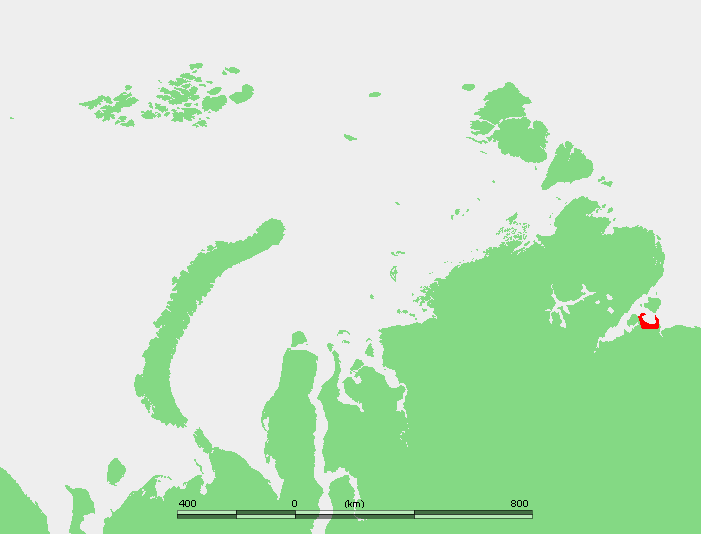
Map showing the location of Nordvik Bay. Nordvik penal colony was located in the small peninsula on the western side of the bay.

Nordvik (Russian: Нордвик) was a settlement and a harbour-port in Krasnoyarsk Krai, Soviet Russia, located on the Khatanga Gulf (Laptev Sea) at the mouth of the Khatanga River, on the Uryung Tumus Peninsula, west of Nordvik Bay.

A penal colony existed in the settlement. The climate is exceptionally severe, with prolonged, bitter winters.

Near Nordvik there is a paleozoic salt dome known as Tus-Takh on the Uryung Tumus Peninsula itself. It was suspected that the ground underneath would probably yield oil and gas. The remains of a plesiosaur (Plesiosaurus robustus) were also found on this peninsula.

== History ==
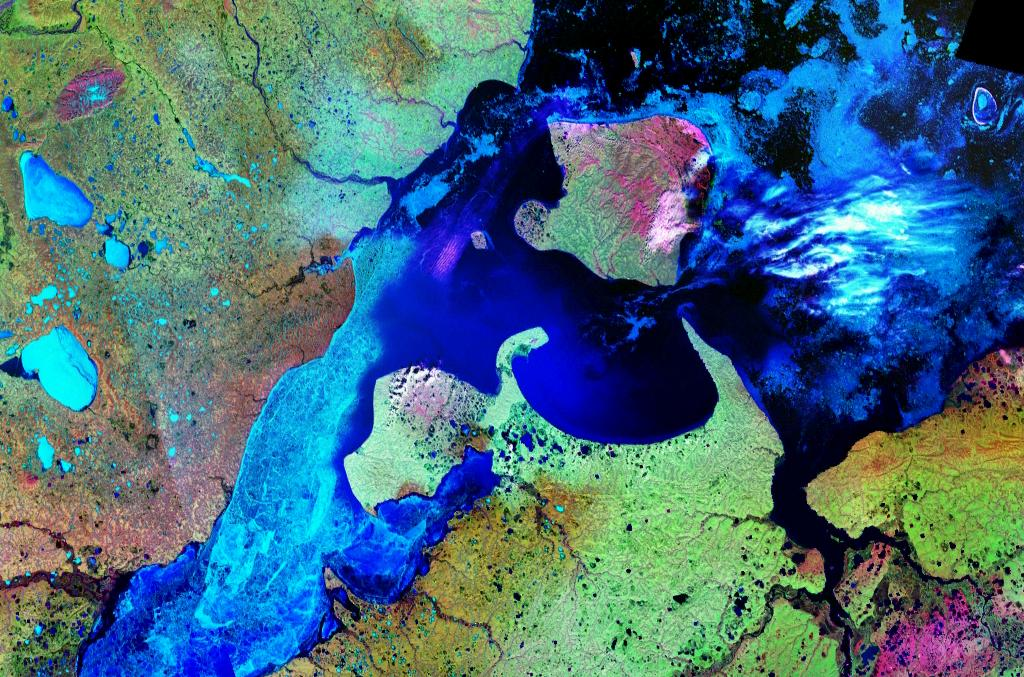
The bay of Nordvik (center) between the rivershed areas of the Khatanga (left: Khatanga Gulf) and Anabar (right: Anabar Gulf). Bolshoy Begichev Island is located to the north.

The name literally means "North Bay" in Norwegian and refers to the Nordvik Bay discovered by the Russian Great Northern Expedition in 1739.

In 1933, the newly formed Glavsevmorput (Chief Directorate of the Northern Sea Route) sent the freighter Pravda to Nordvik with an oil exploration expedition led by N. N. Urvantsev. By September 4, Pravda was close to Nordvik. Сaptain Belitskiy had decided to approach Nordvik Bay from the east, between Poluostrov Paksa and Bolshoy Begichev Island. Despite having no knowledge of the depth of the channel, Belitskiy went ahead without taking the elementary precaution of sounding, and Pravda twice ran aground in the centre of the channel.

According to Urvantsev, drilling at Nordvik over the next few seasons revealed small, shallow oil pockets in connection with salt structures with little commercial significance. However the salt itself was extracted on a fairly massive scale by means of forced labourers in a penal colony. From the 1930s onwards Nordvik became an important source of salt supply for the northern fisheries.

Although the original prospects for oil at Nordvik did not materialise, experience was gained in exploring for hydrocarbons within the continuous permafrost zones. This experience proved invaluable in the later exploration and exploitation of the massive oil and gas fields of Western Siberia.

The penal colony was closed in the mid-1940s when Americans arrived at Nordvik as allies of the Soviet Union. The salt was extracted by internal deportees rather than prisoners after the camp closure.

The settlement at Nordvik was closed in 1956.

== Landscape ==
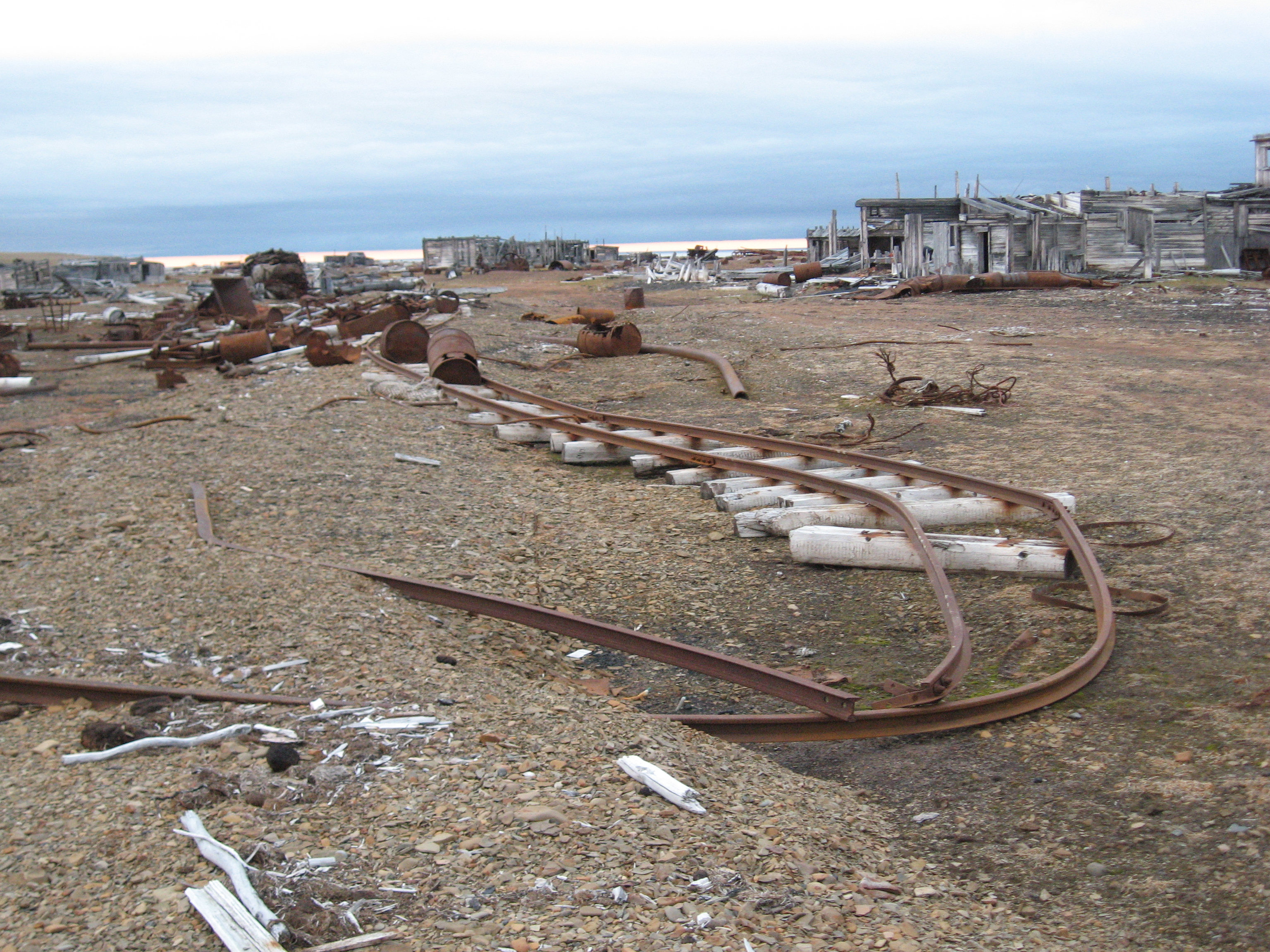

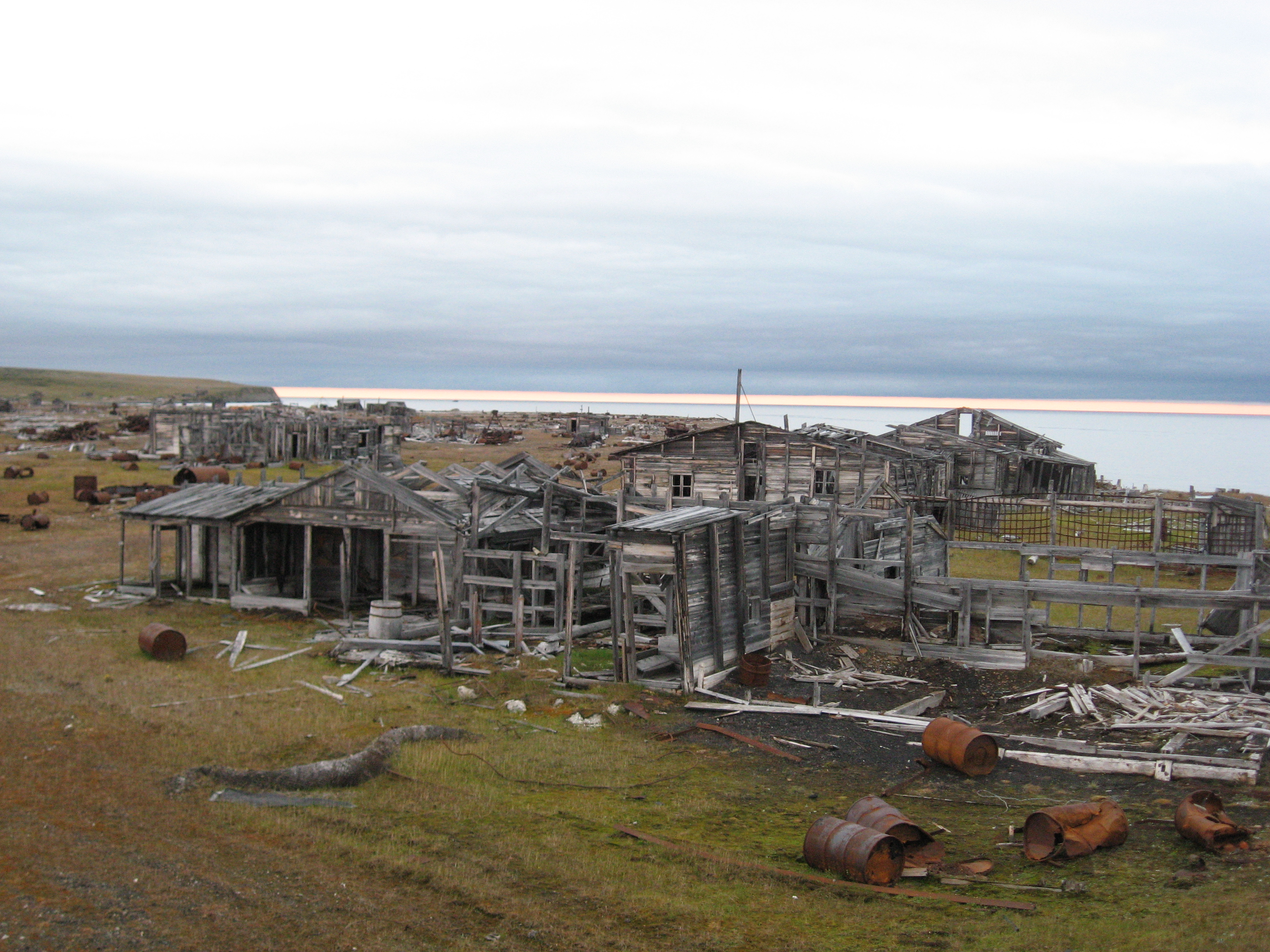
