= Liquid cargo barge =

Barge that transports petrochemicals

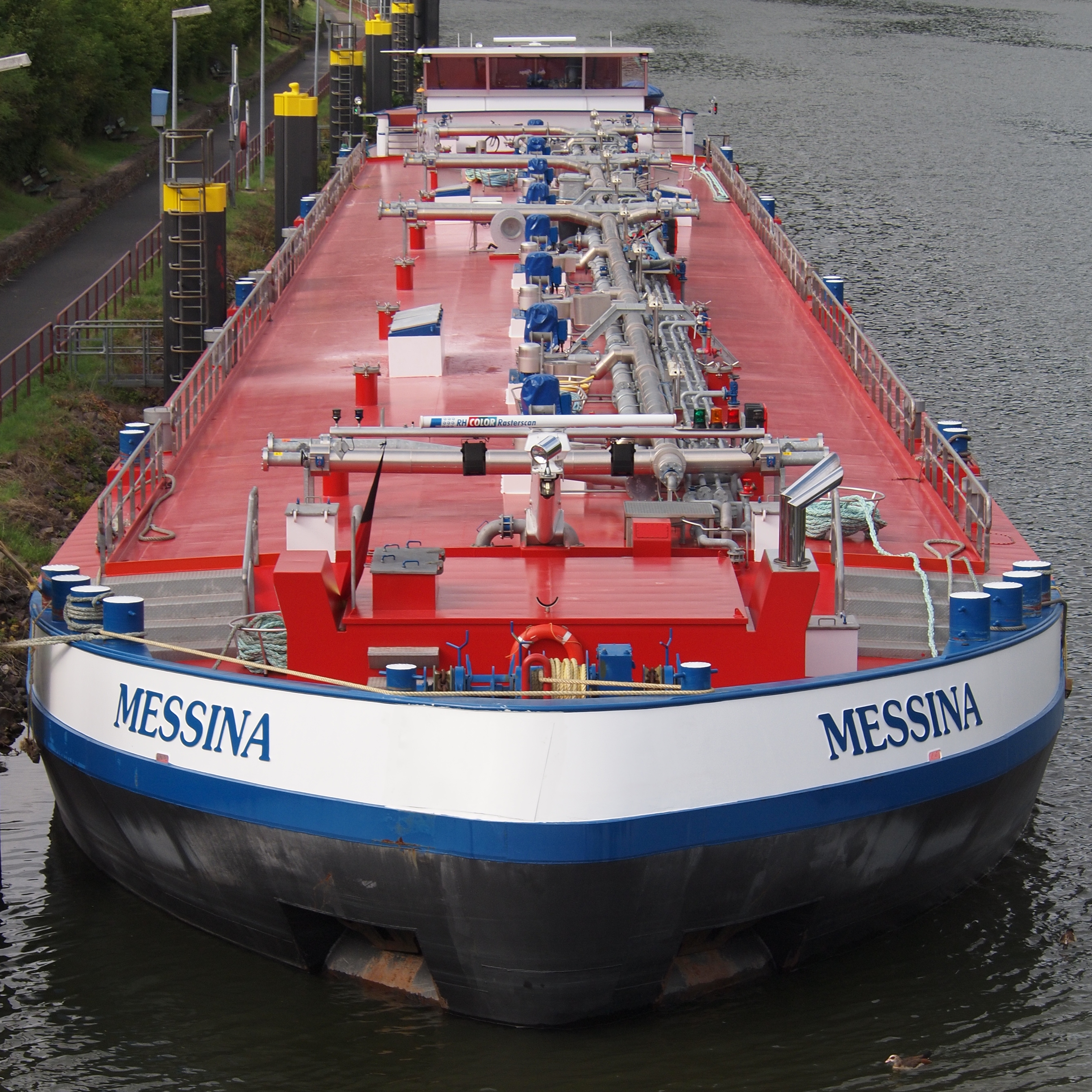
a tank barge

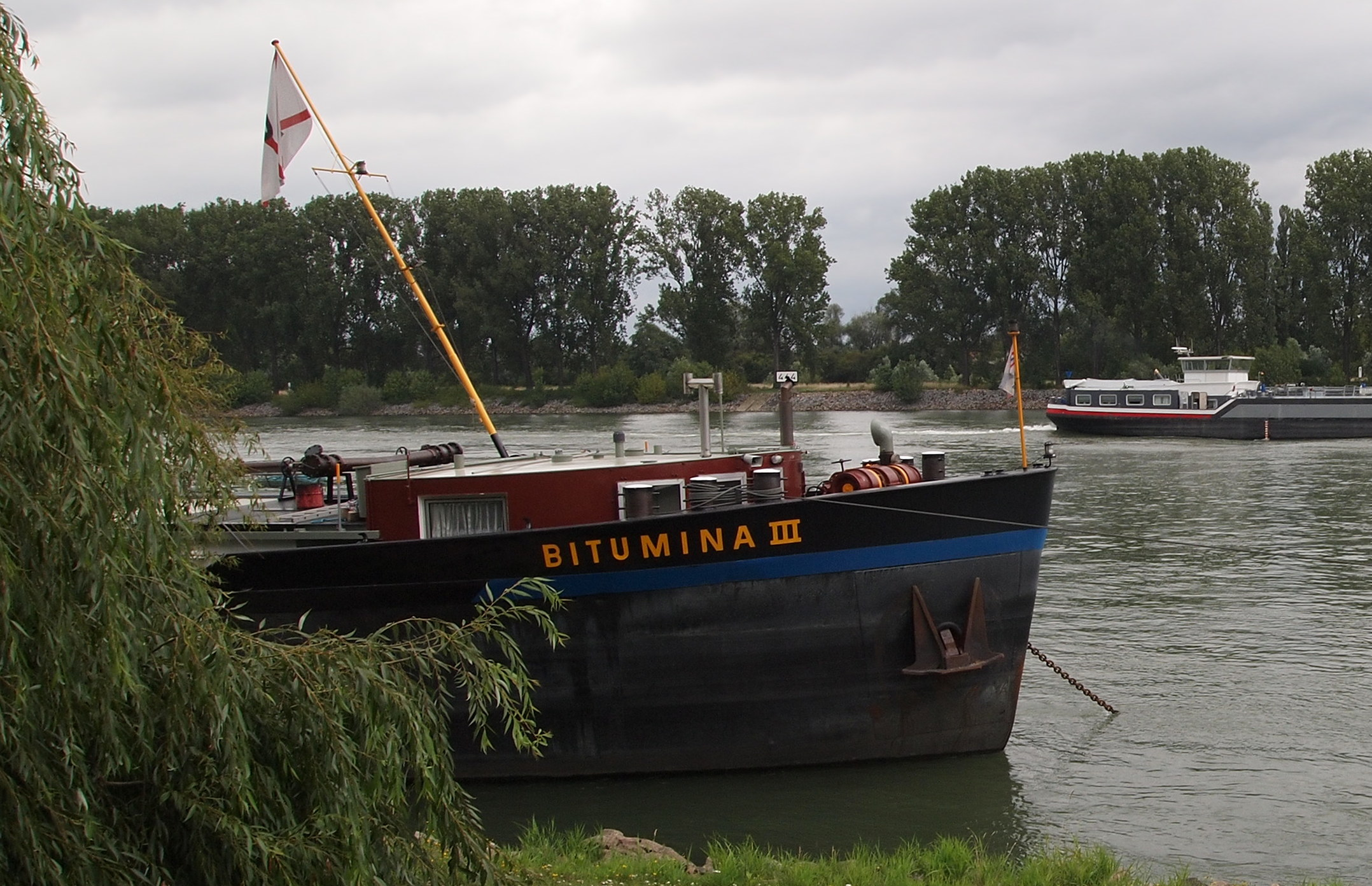
an asphalt barge

Liquid cargo barges are barges that transport petrochemicals, such as styrene, benzene and methanol; liquid fertilizer, including anhydrous ammonia; refined products, including gasoline, diesel fuel, and jet fuel; black oil products, such as asphalt, No. 6 fuel oil and coker fuel; and pressurized products, such as liquefied petroleum gases and butadiene, which are transported on the waterways from producers to end users.

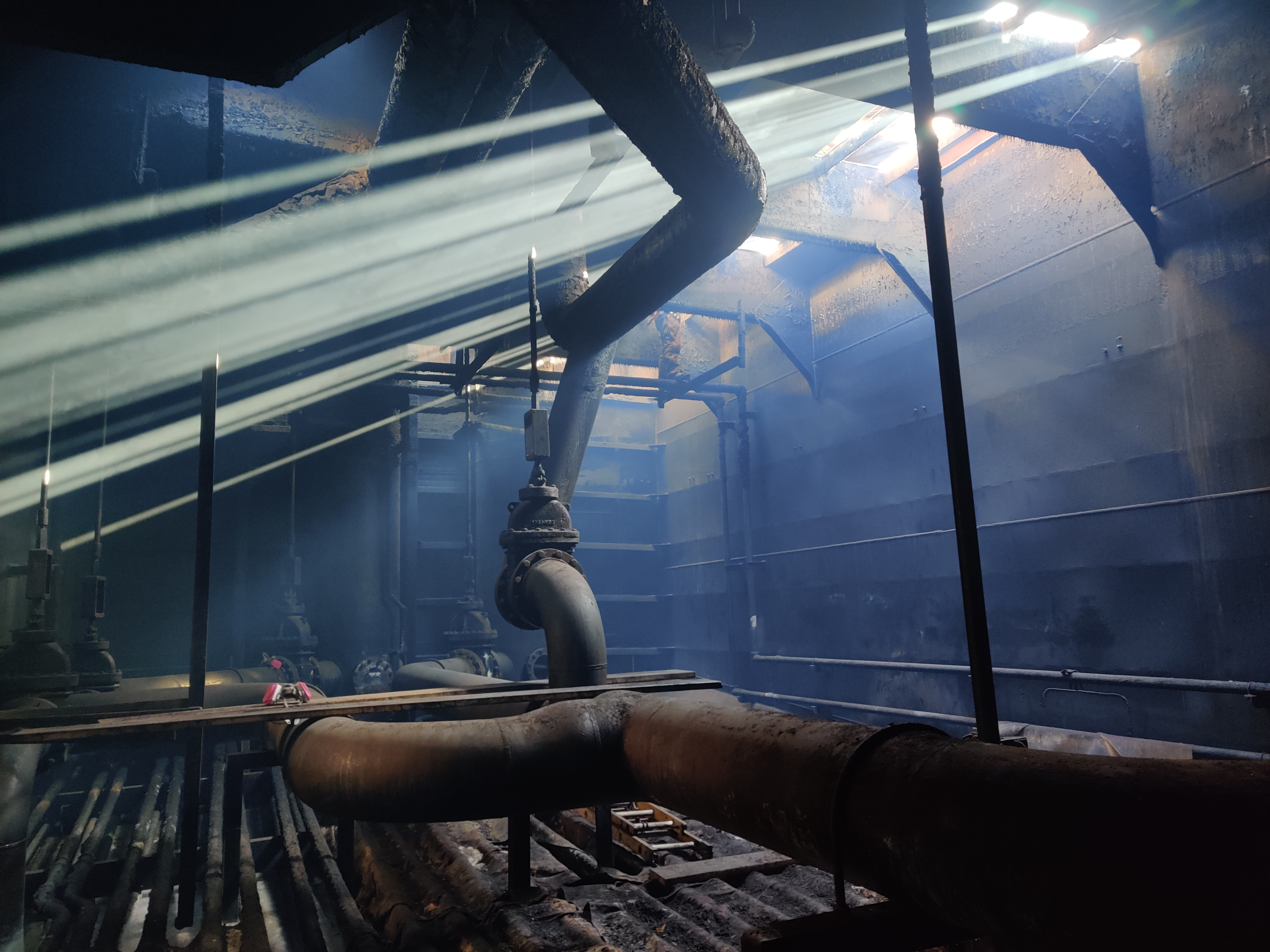
Inside an empty tank within liquid asphalt barge Endeavour while having its deck plates replaced. The heating coils at the bottom of the tank keep the product in a hot, liquid state.

In Russia, Volgotanker operated a fleet of liquid cargo barges on the Volga River system until 2008.
