= Bolshoy Begichev Island =

Island in the Laptev Sea

Bolshoy Begichev
Native name: Большой Бегичев
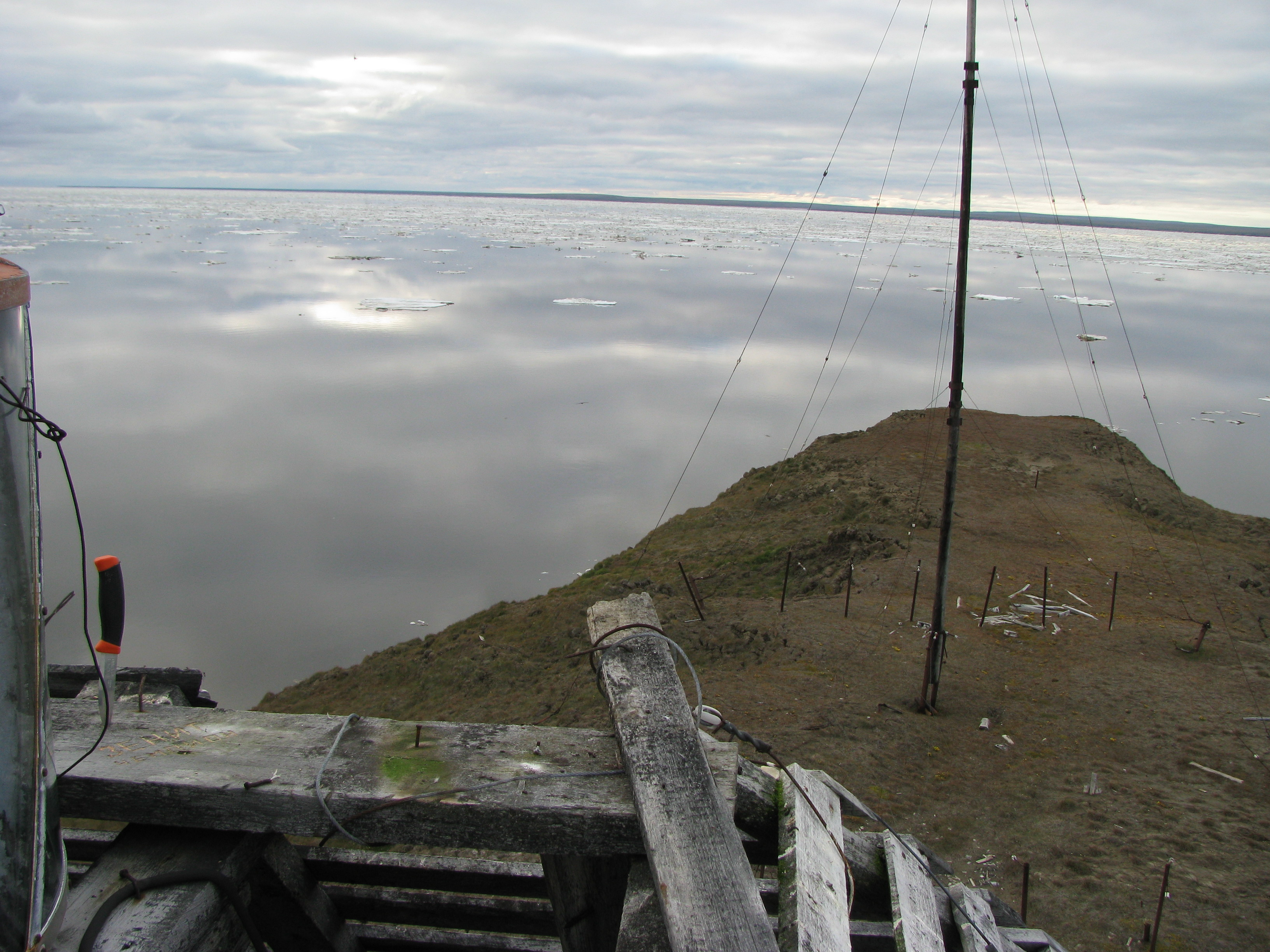
- Paska Cape, Bolshoy Begichev Island

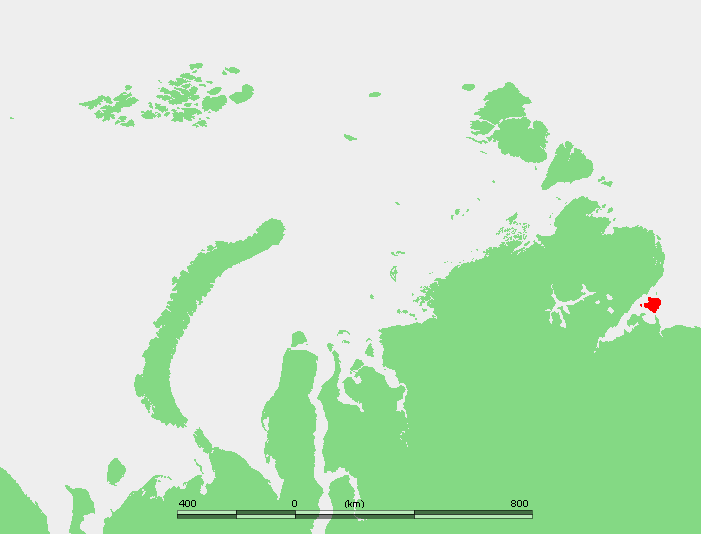
- Location of Maliy Begichev and Bolshoy Begichev islands in the Khatanga Gulf

- Location within Sakha Republic Location within Russia
- Etymology: Named for Nikifor Begichev

Geography
- Location: Laptev Sea
- Coordinates: 74.533333°N 112.033333°E
- Area: 1,764 km^{2} (681 sq mi)

Administration
- Russia
- Republic: Sakha

Demographics
- Population: 0

Bolshoy Begichev (Russian: Большой Бегичев, lit. 'Big Begichev') is an island in the Laptev Sea, in the Sakha Republic, Russia.

== Geography ==
The area of the island is 1,764 square kilometres (681 sq mi). Bolshoy Begichev is located within the Khatanga Gulf (Russian: Хатангский залив), splitting the gulf into two straits.

=== Adjacent Islands ===
==== Maliy Begichev ====
Only 8.5 kilometres (5.3 mi) west of Bolshoy Begichev lies the much smaller island known as Maliy Begichev Island. Its size is only 15 square kilometres (5.8 sq mi). The border between administrative divisions of the Russian Federation runs between the two Begichev islands, so that while Maliy Begichev is in Krasnoyarsk Krai, Bolshoy Begichev is in the Sakha republic. Both Bolshoy Begichev and Maliy Begichev are named after Russian polar explorer Nikifor Begichev.

==== Preobrazheniya ====
North of Bolshoy Begichev lies small Preobrazheniya Island. This elongated granitic island was useful as a landmark for ships plying the Northern Sea Route in the past.

== History ==
A NAVTEX Coast Station used to be situated on the island at 74°32′N 112°02′E. It was added to the list of International 518 kHz NAVTEX stations in GMDSS/Circ.8/Corr.6 (25 October 2002), reiterated in GMDSS/Circ.8/Corr.8 (25 July 2003), and removed in GMDSS/Circ.8/Corr.9 (29 September 2003).

== Natural history ==
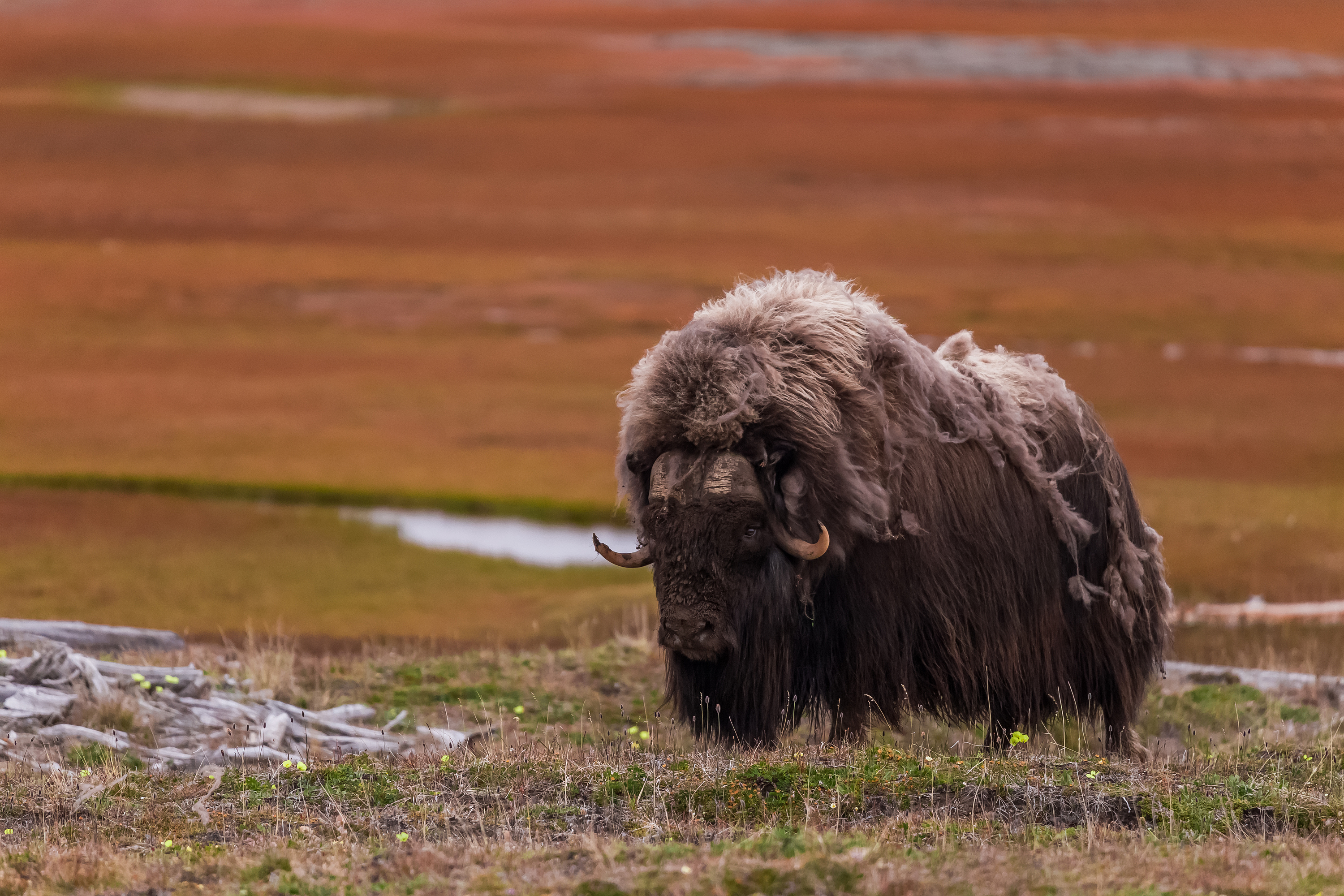
A muskox on Bolshoy Begichev Island in Laptev Sea, in the Terpey-Tumus Natural Monument, Sakha (Yakutia) Republic, Russia

There are muskoxen on the island.
