= Krassin (1916 icebreaker) =

1916 icebreaker for Russian Navy

Coordinates: 59°55′40″N 30°16′08″E

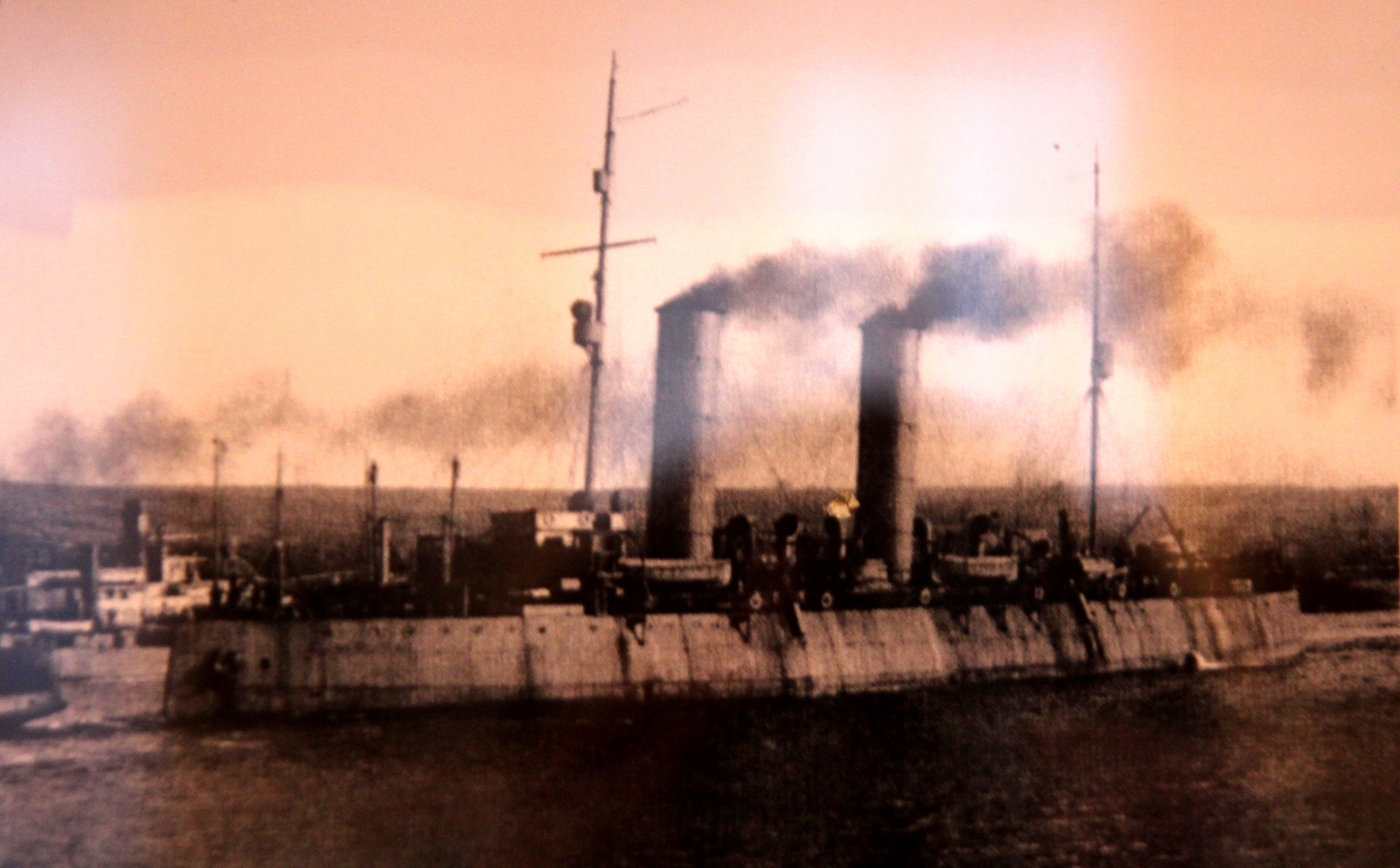
- Icebreaker Svyatogor (renamed Krassin) as completed in 1917

History

Russia
- Name: Svyatogor then Krassin or Krasin
- Namesake: Svyatogor then Leonid Krasin
- Owner: Imperial Russian Navy, then Soviet Navy
- Builder: Armstrong Whitworth, Newcastle upon Tyne
- Yard number: 904
- Launched: 3 August 1916
- Completed: February 1917
- Status: Museum ship in Saint Petersburg

General characteristics
- Class & type: Icebreaker
- Tonnage: 6,048 GRT; 1,687 NRT; 4,220 t DWT
- Length: 99,80 m
- Beam: 21,65 m
- Draft: 7,5 m
- Armament: (in World War II) four 76mm guns, seven 20mm AA guns, 10 large caliber machine guns

The first icebreaker Krassin, or Krasin, (Russian: Красин) was built for the Imperial Russian Navy as Svyatogor. She had a long, distinguished career in rescue operations, as well as a pathfinder and explorer of the Northern Sea Route. She has been fully restored to operating condition and is now a museum ship in Saint Petersburg.

== History ==
The icebreaker was built by Armstrong Whitworth in Newcastle upon Tyne under the supervision of Yevgeny Zamyatin. The vessel was launched as the Svyatogor on 3 August 1916 and completed in February 1917. Up to the beginning of the 1950s she remained the most powerful icebreaker in the world.

During the allied intervention against the Bolsheviks in Northern Russia (1918–19) she was scuttled by Bolshevik forces to block the port at Arkhangelsk. The Royal Navy raised her for use in the White Sea and later brought her to England. She was moved from Devonport to Scapa Flow for crushing hurdles put up to prevent German submarines entering. During this time she undertook minesweeping duties.

Svyatogor was returned to the USSR under the Krasin trade agreement in 1921. In 1927 she was renamed by the Soviet government to honor a recently deceased early Bolshevik leader and Soviet diplomat Leonid Krasin.

Perhaps the most famous duty the Krassin performed was rescuing General Umberto Nobile and his surviving crew when their airship Italia crashed on the ice upon returning from the North Pole in 1928. On return from this mission Krassin helped to repair the German passenger ship Monte Cervantes, with 1,835 passengers on board, after it hit an iceberg and its hull was severely damaged.

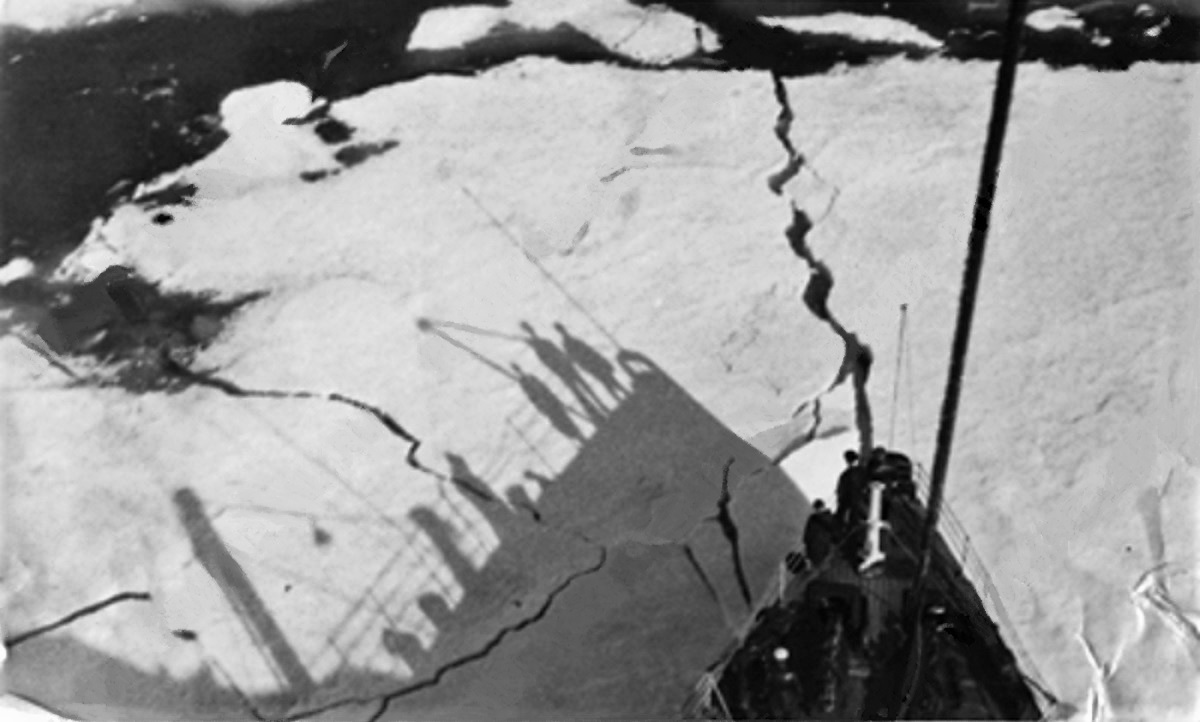
The first ice floe of the Kara Sea aboard the first trip on the first vessel to transit the region

In 1933 Krassin became the first vessel to reach the inaccessible northern shores of Novaya Zemlya in the history of navigation. In 1938, the Krassin rescued the icebreaker Lenin and her convoy, trapped in ice at the end of the previous summer.

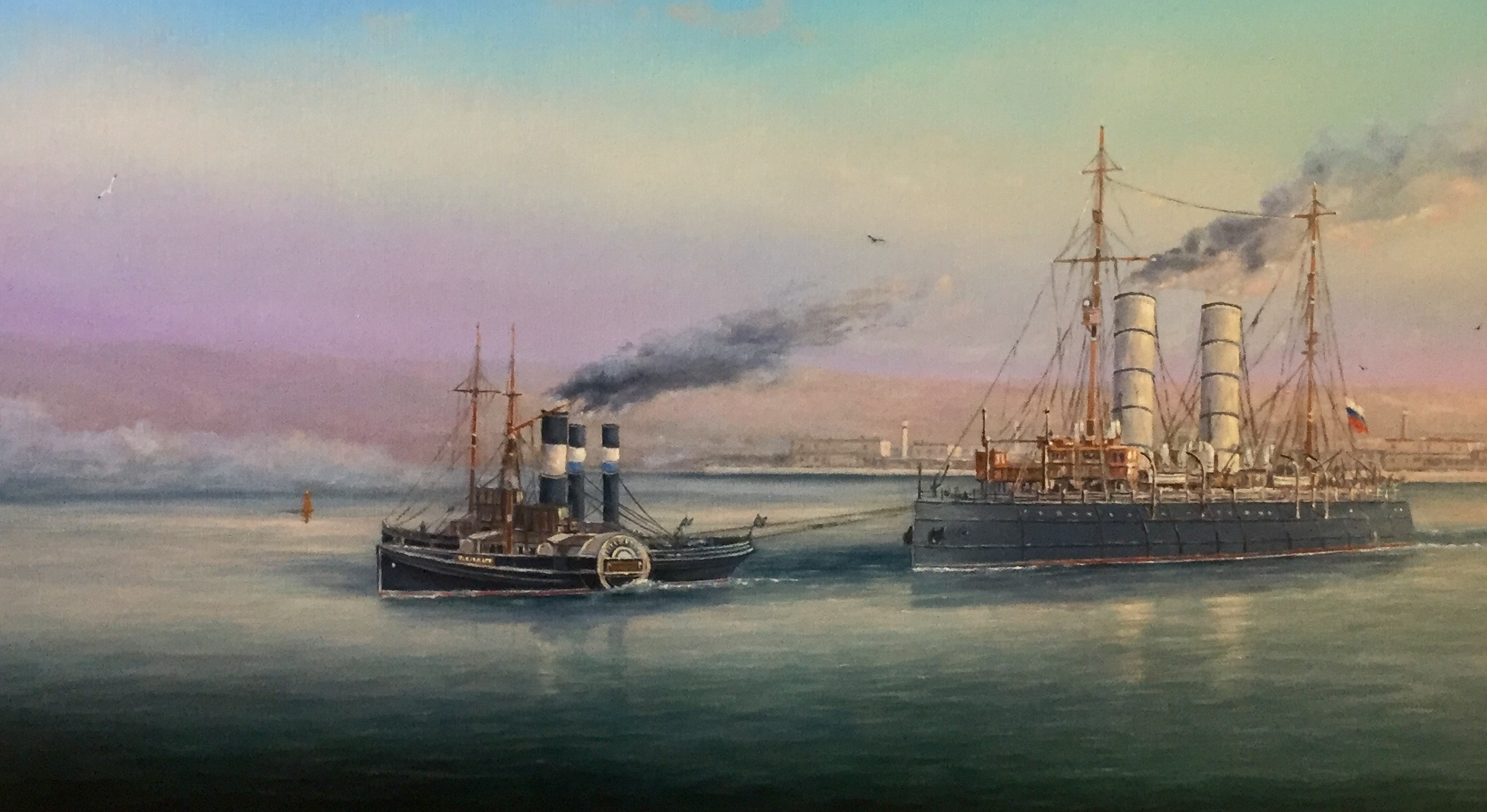
Fragment of the painting Launch of the icebreaker Svyatogor for sea trials. 1916 Vladimir Kosov 60x100 oil on canvas. 2016

During World War II, Krassin participated in many Russian convoys. In 1941 the US Government entered into negotiations with the Soviet Government for the purchase or lease of one or more of their modern ice breakers for use by the US Coast Guard on the east coast of Greenland. The Krassin was offered, and crossed the Pacific to Bremerton, Washington. She was surveyed and found to be in need of repairs totalling about $500,000. Funds were allocated from President Franklin D. Roosevelt's "Emergency Fund for the President", but negotiations came to an abrupt end on 25 November 1941. Although the Krassin never served in the Coast Guard, the service gained valuable knowledge about icebreakers that was put to use in the design of the Wind class icebreakers.

She continued her journey through the Panama Canal to Great Britain, where she was armed with surface and anti-aircraft guns and proceeded to Reykjavik, Iceland to join convoy PQ-15. She escorted the convoy through the North and Barents Seas, around the Kola Peninsula and into Murmansk. In 1942 the Krassin and Lenin were spotted at the Mona Islands in the Kara Sea by a Kriegsmarine plane during Operation Wunderland. The heavy cruiser Admiral Scheer rushed to find them, but providential bad weather, fog and ice conditions saved the icebreakers from destruction.

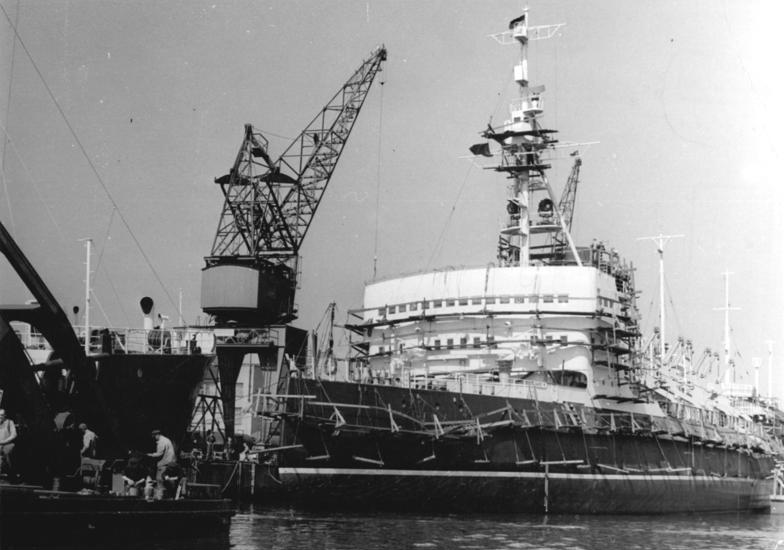
Reconstruction of the Krassin in East Germany, 1959.

Between August 1953 to June 1960, under the East German war reparations program, Krassin was extensively reconstructed at VEB Mathias-Thesen-Werft, Wismar, Germany. She served the Arctic Northern Sea Route until 1971, then was used as an Arctic scientific vessel by the International Fund for the History of Science. Fund president Arkady Melua took part in the ownership transfer on August 10, 1989. The ship was then used for the import of used cars from Europe to Russia, and then sold by Melua to the JSC "Tehimeks." JSC "Tehimeks" planned to sell the icebreaker to the United States of America to be broken up as scrap metal. After the failure of the deal caused by the Russian government it was registered at St. Petersburg, where it was docked as a floating museum.

== Today ==
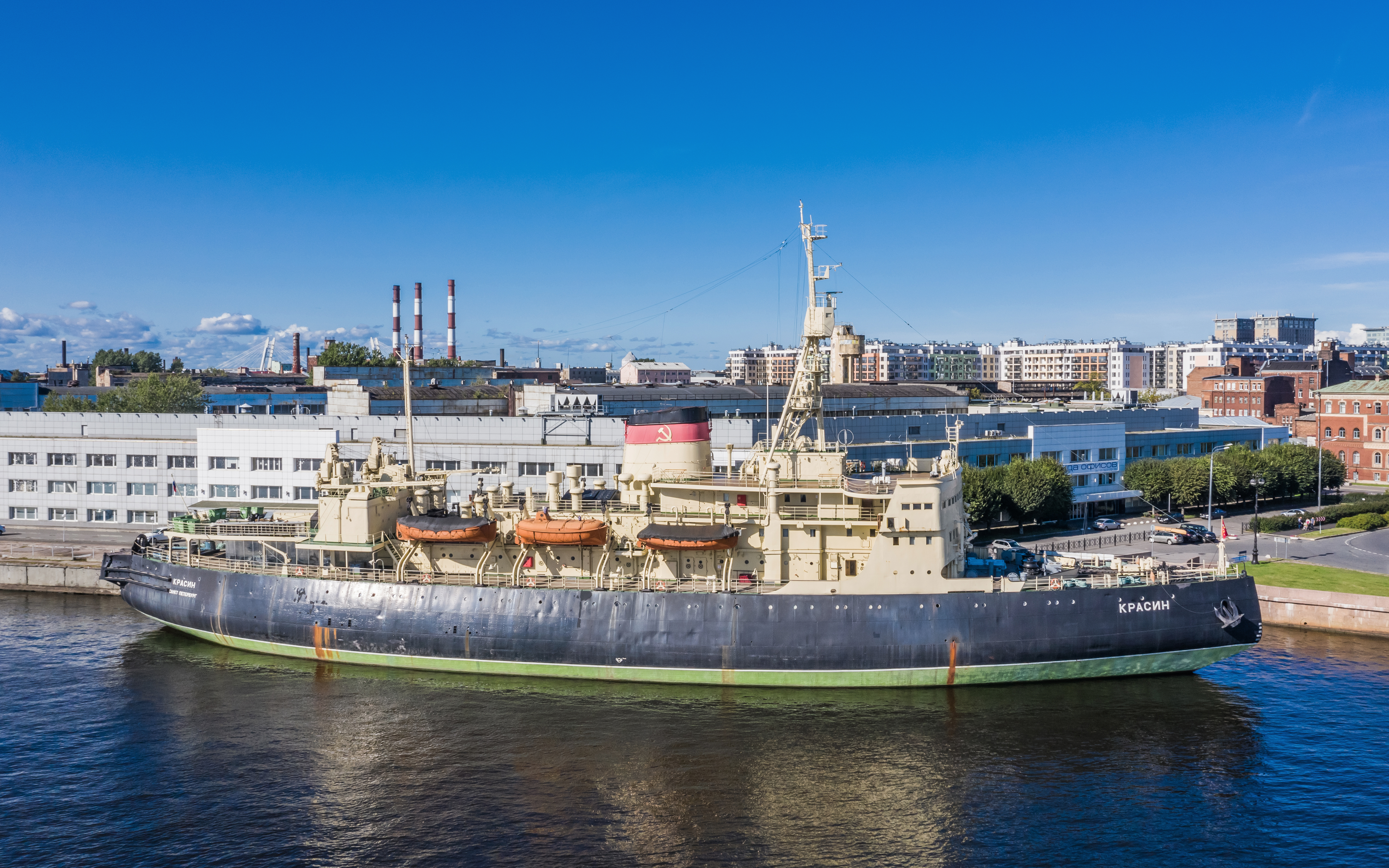
Krassin as a museum ship, 2019

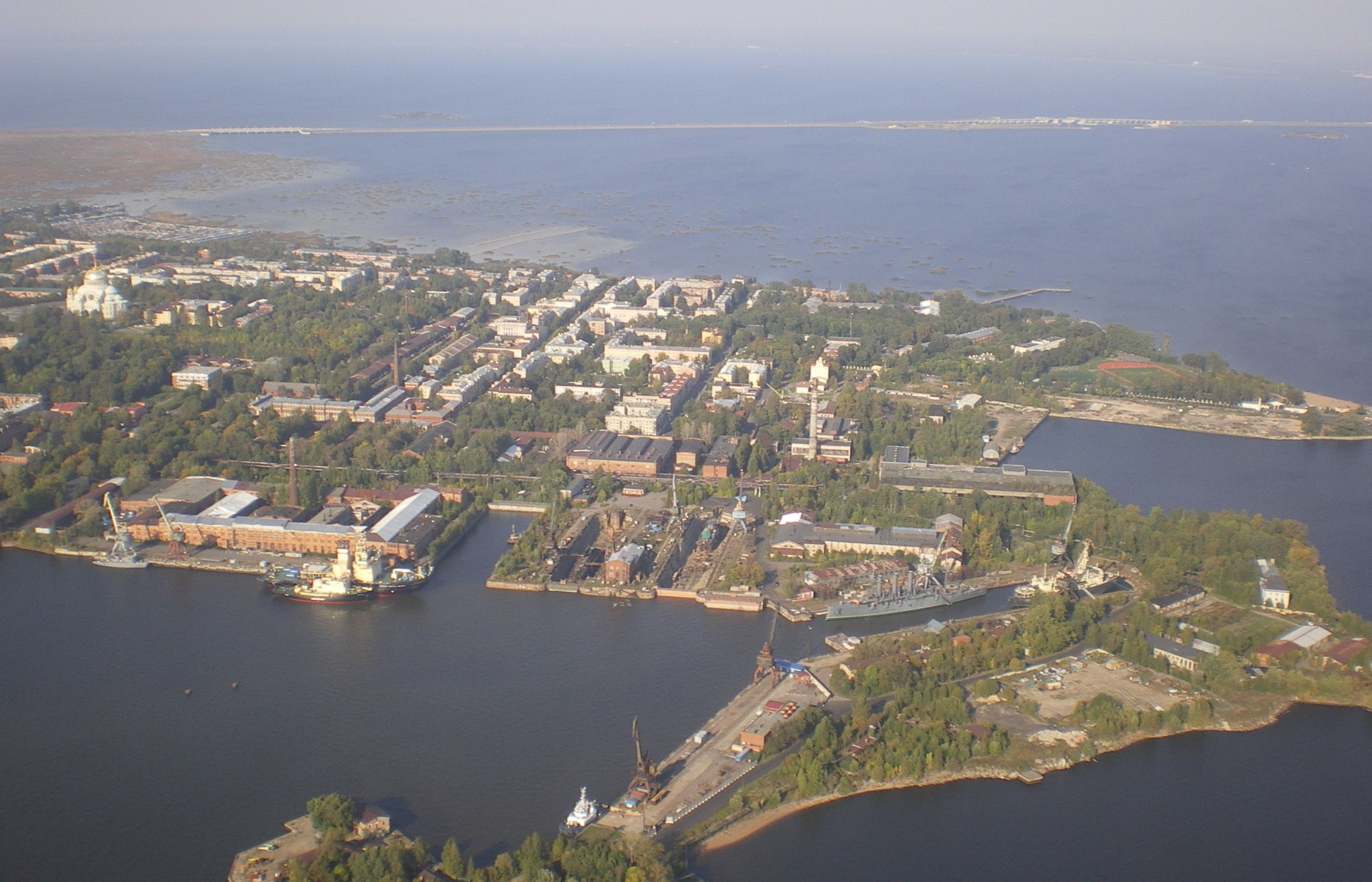
Aurora and Krassin in Kronstadt

After the war, the historic icebreaker took an active part in research expeditions in the Polar Ocean and led Soviet cargo convoys through the polar region. Rather than being destroyed (like the Icebreaker Yermak) to make way for more modern ships, the Krassin was preserved and restored. The vessel is now a museum ship in Saint Petersburg, the only icebreaker maritime museum commemorating the Arctic convoys. She has been fully restored to operating condition and there are plans to sail her to various European ports.

An island in the Nordenskiöld Archipelago was named after this icebreaker. Postage stamps and a coin have been issued in her honor.

== See also ==
- Yakov Legzdin
