= Khatanga Gulf =

Bay of the Laptev Sea

- Хатангский залив (Russian)
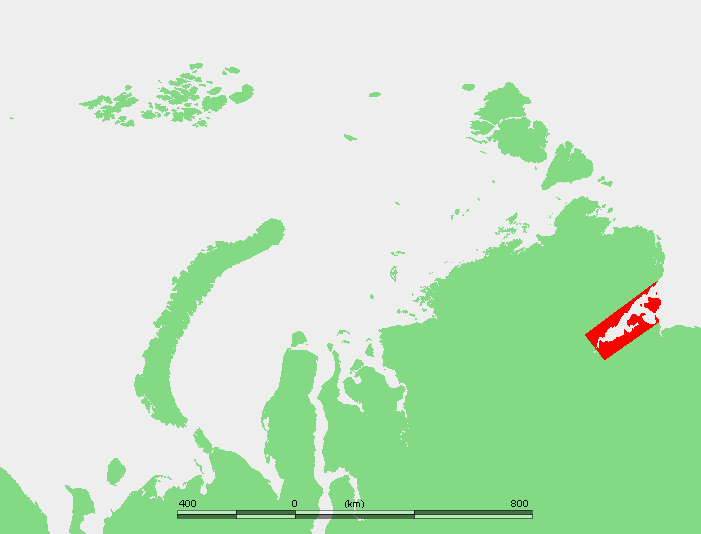
- Map showing the location of the Khatanga Bay.

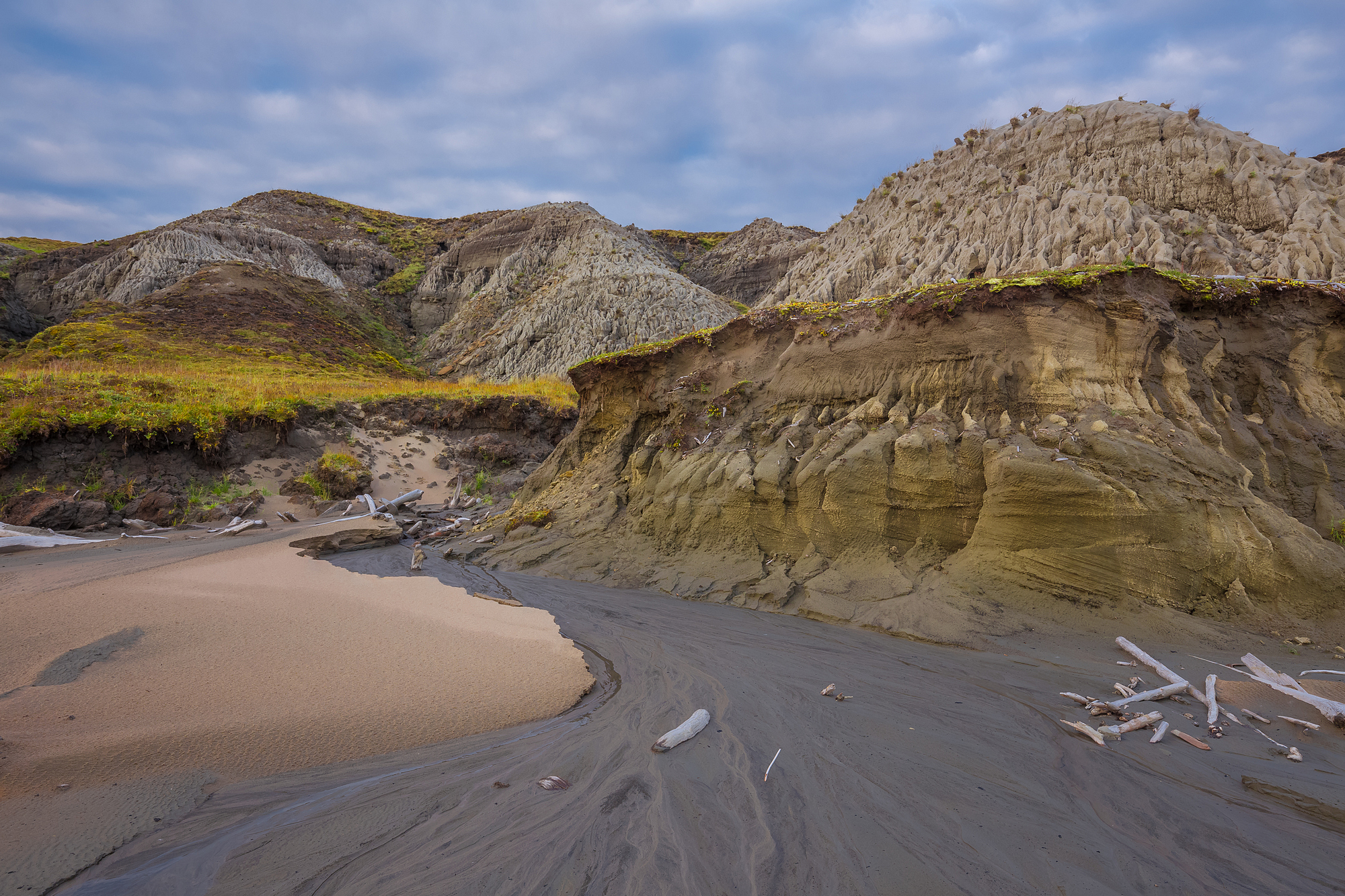

- Location within Krasnoyarsk Krai
- Location: Far North
- Coordinates: 73.75°N 109°E
- River sources: Khatanga River
- Ocean/sea sources: Laptev Sea
- Basin countries: Russia
- Max. length: 220 kilometres (140 mi)
- Max. width: 54 kilometres (34 mi)

The Khatanga Gulf or Khatanga Bay (Russian: Хатангский залив) is a large tidal estuary in the Laptev Sea. It is relatively narrow, its length being 220 kilometres (140 mi) with a maximum width of 54 kilometres (34 mi).

== Geography ==
The Bolshoy Begichev Island divides the gulf into two straits: Northern Strait (13 kilometres (8.1 mi) wide) and Eastern Strait (8 kilometres (5.0 mi) wide). The maximum depth of the gulf is 29 metres (95 ft). The Khatanga River and the Popigay River flow out into the Khatanga Gulf. The shores of the gulf are high, steep, and indented. The tides are semidiurnal reaching up to 1.4 metres (4 ft 7 in). The Khatanga Gulf is covered with ice most of the year.

The shores of the Khatanga Bay are generally raised, consisting of low tundra cliffs, as well as sandstone and mudstone cliffs and sedimentation areas.

Since the administrative border cuts across this area, the northern and western parts of the Khatanga Bay belong to the Krasnoyarsk Krai, while its southeastern side belongs to the Sakha administrative region of the Russian Federation.

The former settlement and penal colony of Nordvik was located by a north-facing bay on the Eastern Strait of the Khatanga Gulf known as Bukhta Nordvik.
