= Vilkitsky Strait =

Strait in the Severnaya Zemlya archipelago of Russia

- пролив Вилькицкого (Russian)
- Vilkitsky Strait, Russia

- Location in Krasnoyarsk Krai
- Location: Arctic
- Coordinates: 77°57′N 103°35′E
- Ocean/sea sources: Kara Sea / Laptev Sea
- Basin countries: Russia
- Max. length: 104 km (65 mi)
- Max. width: 55 km (34 mi)

Vilkitsky Strait (Russian: пролив Вилькицкого) is a strait between the Taimyr Peninsula and Bolshevik Island in the Severnaya Zemlya archipelago of Russia. The strait connects the Kara and Laptev Seas. The length of the Vilkitsky Strait is 128 km, the width approx. 55 km and the depth between 32 m and 210 m. It is covered with drifting ice all year round. The strait was discovered in 1913 by a Russian hydrographic expedition led by Boris Vilkitsky and then named after him in 1918.

The Geiberg Islands cover the entrance to the Vilkitsky Strait from the east, and the Firnley Islands do so from the west. The shores on the side of the Taymyr Peninsula are covered with tundra vegetation and scattered stones. The northern coast is higher, and it becomes lower going south. The rivers that flow into the Vilkitsky Strait from the continental side are not significant. They are shallow and not suitable for navigation.
