= Khorbusuonka =

River in Yakutia (Sakha Republic), Russia

Khorbusuonka Хорбусуонка
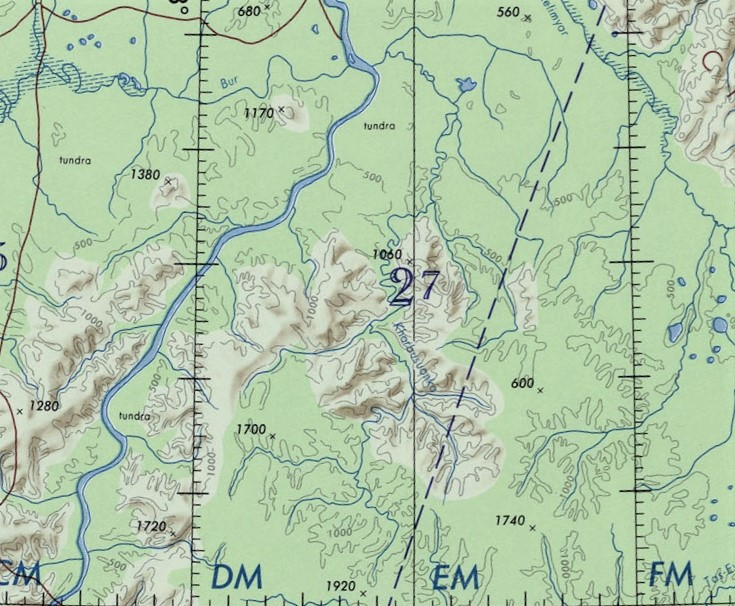
- Course of the Khorbusuonka ONC map section

- Mouth location in Yakutia, Russia Khorbusuonka (Russia)

Location
- Country: Russian Federation
- Federal subject: Yakutia
- District: Bulunsky District

Physical characteristics
- Source
  - location: Kystyk Plateau
- Mouth: Olenyok
  - coordinates: 71°46′52″N 123°48′51″E
- Length: 290 km (180 mi)
- Basin size: 3,230 km^{2} (1,250 sq mi)

Basin features
- Progression: Olenyok→Laptev Sea

The Khorbusuonka (Russian: Хорбусуонка) is a river in Yakutia (Sakha Republic), Russia. It is a tributary of the Olenyok with a length of 290 kilometres (180 mi) and a drainage basin area of 3,230 square kilometres (1,250 mi^{2}).

The river flows north of the Arctic Circle across a lonely, desolate area of Bulunsky District devoid of settlements.

== Course ==
The Khorbusuonka is a right tributary of the Olenyok. Its sources are in the southern part of the Kystyk Plateau, located southwest of the Chekanovsky Ridge. It flows first in an ESE direction, then it bends and flows roughly northwards, still within the plateau. Its channel is winding within a wide valley in the Kystyk Plateau area. In its very last stretch the river descends to the Olenyok floodplain, where there are a few lakes right by the great river to the south of the Kelimyar. Finally the Khorbusuonka joins the right bank of the Olenyok river 221 km (137 mi) upstream of its mouth. The confluence is only 4 km (2.5 mi) upstream from the mouth of the Bur in the opposite bank.

Owing to the harshness of the climate the river is frozen most of the year. It stays under ice between early October and early June. Its longest tributaries are the 101 kilometres (63 mi) long Nykaabyt (Ньыкаабыт), the 40 kilometres (25 mi) long Syyrdaakh-Yurege (Сыырдаах-Юрэгэ), the 50 kilometres (31 mi) long Khorbusuonkachaan, the 33 kilometres (21 mi) long Yuyosee-Yuyoteekh (Юёсээ-Юёттээх) and the 23 kilometres (14 mi) long Khatyspyt from the right, as well as the 39 kilometres (24 mi) long Anabyl (Анабыл) and the 38 kilometres (24 mi) long Mattaya from the left.

== Flora and fauna ==
The river basin is dominated by tundra with sparse larch forest and some willow thickets by the riverside in wide valleys. Since the area is uninhabited, deer are numerous and fearless. The main fish species in the waters is lenok.

== See also ==
- List of rivers of Russia
