= Bulkur =

River in Russia

Bulkur Булкур
- Mouth location in Yakutia, Russia

Location
- Country: Russia

Physical characteristics
- Source: Chekanovsky Ridge
  - coordinates: 71°43′34″N 126°19′10″E
  - elevation: 238 m (781 ft)
- Mouth: Lena
  - coordinates: 71°51′38″N 127°06′32″E
  - elevation: 2 m (6 ft 7 in)
- Length: 41 km (25 mi)

Basin features
- Progression: Lena→ Laptev Sea

Bulkur (Russian: Булкур) is a river of the Sakha Republic in northern Russia, approximately 100 kilometres (62 mi) west of Tiksi. It is a minor left tributary of the Lena, located near where the river empties into the Laptev Sea forming a wide delta. It is 41 kilometres (25 mi) long.

== Course ==
The river has its sources in the Chekanovsky Ridge. It flows roughly northeastwards across Bulunsky District, north of the Eyekit. Finally it meets the left bank of the Lena 68 km (42 mi) from its mouth.

== History ==
In 1881 the area was visited by Swedish explorers. They described it as follows:

"Situated near the point where the Lena, after having cut its way through the Verkoyansky mountain chain, empties its masses of water through a large number of canals into the Polar Sea, this place affords a view in its wild grandeur."

== See also ==
- List of rivers of Russia
