= Aleksander Czekanowski =

Polish explorer and geologist (1833–1876)

Aleksander P. Czekanowski
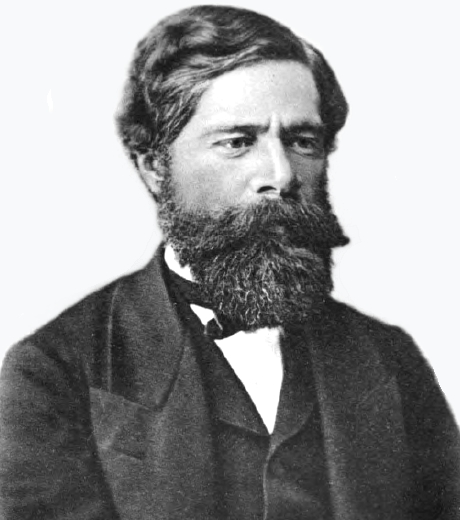
- Born: 24 February 1833; Kremenets, Russian Empire
- Died: 30 October 1876 (aged 43); Saint Petersburg, Russian Empire
- Known for: Siberian exploration
- Scientific career
- Fields: Geography, geology

Aleksander Piotr Czekanowski, or Aleksandr Lavrentyevich Chekanovsky (Russian: Александр Лаврентьевич Чекановский, 24 February 1833 – 30 October 1876) was a Polish geologist and explorer of Siberia during his exile after participating in the January Uprising. He took part in and later led several expeditions, surveying and mapping the geology of Eastern Siberia. He was released from exile in 1875, and in 1876 took up the post of custodian in the Mineralogical Museum of the Academy of Sciences.

== Biography ==
Aleksander Czekanowski was born on 12 February 1833 in Krzemieniec, Volhynia. His father Wawrzyniec ran a boarding house and was an honorary assistant in a zoological office at the Krzemieniec Lyceum. Shortly after the birth of Alexander, his family moved to Kiev. In 1850 Alexander began studying medicine at the Faculty of Medicine in Kiev. While there he also attended lectures on natural science and participated in local field trips during which he developed a strong interest in geology. After receiving a doctor's diploma in 1855 but without a taste for medicine, the 25-year-old Czekanowski moved to Tartu to study mineralogy for two years. It was at this time that he joined the oldest students' corporation Polonia.

After graduating in 1857 he returned to Kiev where he started working at Siemens and Halske, which was at the time engaged in the construction of a telegraph line from Russia to India. The work was involved frequent trips which gave him the opportunity to conduct scientific research. In addition to his main work, he also systematised the paleontological collections of the University of Kiev.

Shortly before the January Uprising, the elite of local Polish youth gathered in his apartment. Accused of participating in the uprising, Czekanowski was arrested and sentenced to indefinite exile in Siberia, whereupon he was sent on foot from Kiev to Tobolsk. Upon his arrival in Tobolsk, he was sent into exile in Tomsk where he contracted typhoid fever, the consequences of which were periodic mental disorders. After recovering a little from the disease, in 1866 he was exiled to Bratsk where he became interested in the local geology. He was then deported to near Chita, Zabaykalsky Krai in Transbaikalie west of Lake Baikal. During his deportation he began to collect and classify insects he found along the way using a magnifying glass made from a broken carafe. Transferred to the surroundings of Bratskii Ostrog on the Angara, he lived in misery for several years, but despite the harsh climate and hard work among the local peasants, he continued his scientific work provided the academic museums with natural history collections. He studied the geology of the region around Angara and made meteorological observations using instruments of his own design.

At this time, the academician Fedor Bogdanovich Schmidt, an acquaintance from Tartu, who saved him from this difficult situation. Having had a business trip Academy of Sciences to Siberia, found out about the fate of Chekanovski in Irkutsk and informed prominent scientists in St Petersburg. He bought a collection from Czekanowski and ordered more, as well as providing him with books. After using all his influence for two years, he obtained from the authorities the release of Czekanowski, his transfer from Padun to Irkutsk, and assignment to the Siberian Department of the Russian Geographical Society. It was then that Czekanowski began exploring the southern part of Irkutsk Oblast.

=== Expeditions to Siberia (1869–1872) ===
From 1869 to 1875 he made several expeditions to Eastern Siberia to study the geological structure of Irkutsk province. Between 1869 and 1871 Chekanovski conducted work on the study of Baikal Mountains and Siberian lands from Baikal to Yenisei and Sayan Mountains, and also studied Irkutsk province. In 1869, he defined the Primorsky Range (1728 m), which stretches along the western shore of Lake Baikal, as an independent morphographic unit. In 1871 together with Wiktor Godlewski and Benedykt Dybowski he explored the northern part of the shore of Lake Khövsgöl in Mongolia. His stay in Irkutsk was marked by a number of scientific discoveries that brought him the glory of “one of the outstanding geologists of Russia”. Published in 1872, his monograph on the Irkutsk province was awarded a gold medal, and the collections collected in Ust-Baley formed the basis of the famous work on the Jurassic flora, written by professor Geer of the University of Zurich.

=== Research between the Yenisei River and the Lena River (1872–1875) ===
In 1872, Czekanowski proposed to the Geographical Society to explore the area between Yenisei and Lena, which at the time was still a "big white spot" in terms of hydrography and relief. The company commissioned him to lead a small research expedition lasting two years, to which Ferdinand Ferdinandovich Miller was appointed to its staff as astronomer and physicist. From 1872 to 1875, the two explored Central Siberian Plateau.

The first expedition began in March 26 1873 when Czekanowski went from Irkutsk to the source of the Lena, where he studied the geological structure of the banks of the upper reaches of the Lena and Angara rivers. When the ice drift began on the Angara, physicist Miller and the Nakhalny topographer joined him from Irkutsk. May 12 the group moved in boats along the Angara River to the headwaters Lower Tunguska. Over the three summer months of 1873, travellers traced the entire course of the Lower Tunguska to its mouth, plotting it on a map and determining its length (2989 km). It was the second scientific expedition to the Lower Tunguska after Daniel Messerschmidt (1723). In September 1873, the expedition, having passed the Arctic Circle, reached the Yenisei and by November 5 had returned to Irkutsk. The main result of this expedition was the discovery of a huge trap cover (the Middle Siberian Traps), traced by him along the valley of the Lower Tunguska for over 1900 kilometers. In addition, Czekanowski's “Additional information to the map of the Lower Tunguska River" for the first time described the territory along the river as a plateau – a hill with characteristic table mountains. He had in fact made the scientific discovery of the Central Siberian Plateau and described the relief of its central part.

A new second expedition was hastily prepared, which was to cross the Arctic Circle and conduct research to the still unknown river Olenyok. On 25 December 1873 Czekanowski and Miller left Irkutsk with two local guides travelled to Dolna Tunguska and proceeded on to 63º N, before continuing north-northwest to reach the springs of the river Vilyuy (66°00′N 104°00′E). The journey lasted two months, and finally, in April, the expedition reached the shores Syurungna (Vilyui). After several weeks of exploring the shores of Lake Yakongna, June 6 1874, the expedition reached a fairly significant river. Czekanowski, having decided that it was the Olenyok, however, the local Evenks explained that it was Moyero (the right tributary of the Kotuya from the Khatanga basin), and Olenyok was located to the northeast. From Moyero, the two crossed the hill Bukochan that acts as a low watershed, and crossed to the Oleneok about 150 kilometres below the source, and in July began rafting down on the river on a raft. At the end of September they reached 70º 30` N, and when the river froze they continued downstream with reindeer herds, crossing the Central Siberian Plateau in a northeast direction and reaching the river mouth in early November. Then they returned again to 70º 30` N, ascend one of the right tributaries of Olenyok, crossed watershed and between Olenyok and Lena and descend on the latter to the village of Bulun. From there in Verkhoyansk they reached Yakutsk and in January 1875 returned to Irkutsk. Czekanowski established that there are no high mountains along the Olenyok, and according to his definition, the length of the river was about 2350 kilometres (according to the latest data – 2292 kilometers). Miller was the first to measure the heights of Eastern Siberia.

=== Study of the Lena River (1875) ===
Organising his third Siberian expedition, A. L. Czekanowski intended to "go along the banks of the Lena to the mouth and, if possible, then go to the mouth of the Olenyok from the sea." He hoped to have time to conduct geological exploration of the banks of the Lena River before the onset of winter, but a short summer frustrated his plans. From a barge Czekanowski conducted an investigation of the banks of the Lena from Yakutsk to Bulun exploring the Lena River for a distance of about 1,200 kilometres (750 mi), from Yakutsk to the mouth to the Eyekit, its left tributary. At first, the path ran along the deep and wide bay of the Eyekit river, and then along the rocky and mountainous watershed area lying between the Lena and the Olenyok and descending along the Kelimyar River to the Olenyok. In this way he discovered a 350 kilometres (220 mi) long ridge (highest point 432 metres (1,417 ft)), which was later named Chekanovski at the suggestion of Edward Toll. From the Kelimyar he traced the course of the Olenyok to its mouth. August 26 from the top of Mount Karanchat they saw the ocean. By the 18 September the expedition was already in Bulun, having safely crossed the frozen Lena. The expedition reached Verkhoyansk by reindeer from where they went through the mountains and tundra reaching Irkutsk on the 20 December 1875.

Thus ended the three expeditions of A. L. Czekanowski, the zoological results of which were recognized as “the richest of all that have ever been undertaken in Siberia. The reports of the expedition, rich in content, being translated into different languages, became the property of science, and the maps compiled by him significantly changed and supplemented the map of Asian Russia. ” He wrote the first reliable data on the geology of this region (1873), the southern course of the Lena and the Olenyok region (1874–75). He also discovered coal and graphite deposits over the Lower Tunguska River.

=== Final Years (1875–1876) ===
Upon his return from his last expedition, he received notice that he was amnestied, and returned to St Petersburg, to handle the processing of materials collected by him during the expeditions from the point of view of geography, geology and paleontology.. In the same year, he presented to the Academy of Sciences a project of an expedition in which he set out to geologically explore all the large Siberian rivers in the territory between the Yenisei, Lena, Anabar, Khatanga and Pyasina. However, the expedition's equipment required large sums of money, and the project of Czekanowski met with serious objections. This provoked an exacerbation of his mental disorder and on October 18 (30), 1876 Czekanowski committed suicide by taking a large dose of poison. His materials were not published until 1896 under the title ' Diary of the expedition on the rivers Nizhny Tunguska, Olenek and Lena in 1873 – 1875 "" (St. Petersburg, 1896). His botanical and zoological collections have been the subject of studies by numerous scientists since.

== Awards and honours ==
In 1870 he received a gold medal from the Russian Geographical Society. He also received a medal in 1875 from the International Geographical Congress in Paris for his mapping of Eastern Siberia.

His name was given to the mountain range in Siberia between the Lena and Olenyok rivers – Czekanowski Mountains (Russian: Чекановского Кряж), Czekanowski peak (Russian: Пик Чекановского) – at 2069 m one of the higher peaks of the Khamar-Daban mountains, streets in Lublin i.e. Wrotków district), Pruszcz Gdański and in Zielona Góra at the Scholarly Estate. In his honour the extinct ginkgo of the genus Czekanowskia and an early Triassic ammonite Prosphingites Czekanowskii from the Jurassic period.

Several extinct taxa named Czekanowski include:

- Agnostus czekanowskii Schmidt, 1886 – Middle Cambrian trilobite, Northern Siberia.
- Triangulaspis czekanowskii (Toll, 1899) – Lower Cambrian trilobite, Eastern Siberia.
- Angarocanis czekanowskii (Schmidt, 1886) – Silurian Eurypterid, Siberia.
- Primitia czekanowskii Schmidt, 1886 – Silurian Ostracod, Siberia.
- Modiola czekanowskii Lahusen, 1886 – Middle Jurassic Mussels, Siberia.
- Oxytoma czekanowskii Teller, 1886 – Late Triassic clam, northern Russia.
- Bellerophon czekanowskii Schmidt, 1858 – Early Norovice snail, southern coast Gulf of Finland.
- Epiczekanowskites Popov, 1961 – Middle Triassic ammonite, Russia.
- Polyptychites tshekanovskii Pavlow, 1914 – Early Cretaceous Ammonite, Eastern Siberia.
- Palaeniscinotus czekanowskii Rohon, 1890 – Early Cretaceous fish, Siberia.
- Sorocaulus szekanowskii (Schmalhausen, 1879) – Permian Equisetum (horsetail), Siberia.
- Asplenium czekanowskii Schmalhausen, 1879 – Permian Pteridophyte (inc. ferns and lycophytes), Siberia

His name is also borne by several contemporary plants and animals:

- Aconitum czekanovskyi
- Oxytropis czekanowskii
- Saxifraga czekanowskii
- Myosotis czekanowskii
- Papaver czekanowskii
- A hybrid larch Larix × czekanowskii
- A fish Rhynchocypris czekanowskii (synonym for Phoxinus czekanowskii) (Czekanowski's minnow)
- Dendryphantes czekanowskii (a spider)
- Chelis czekanowskii (a moth)
- Tropodiaptomus czekanowskii (a copepod)
- Scoliocentra czekanowskii (a fly)

== Sources ==
- "Чекановский, Александр Лаврентьевич" . Brockhaus and Efron Encyclopedic Dictionary (in Russian). 1906.
