= Chekurovka =

Chekurovka Чекуровка Чекуровка (Sakha)
- Selo
- Interactive map of Chekurovka
- Location of Chekurovka Chekurovka (Sakha Republic)
- Coordinates: 71°02′54″N 127°30′44″E
- Country: Russia
- Federal subject: Sakha Republic
- Administrative district: Bulunsky District
- Rural okrugSelsoviet: Bulunsky National (Evenk) Rural Okrug
- Elevation: 270 m (890 ft)

Population (2010 Census)
  - Total: 0
  - Estimate (2021): 0 )

Municipal status
  - Municipal district: Bulunsky Municipal District
  - Rural settlement: Kyusyur Rural Settlement
- Time zone: UTC+
- Postal code: 678420
- OKTMO ID: 98612412106

Chekurovka (Russian: Чекуровка; Yakut: Чекуровка) is a rural locality (a selo), in Bulunsky National (Evenk) Rural Okrug of Bulunsky District in the Sakha Republic, Russia, located 60 kilometers (37 mi) Kyusyur, the administrative centre of the rural okrug and 188 kilometers (117 mi) from Tiksi, the administrative center of the district. Its population as of the 2010 Census was 0, the same as recorded during the 2002 Census.

== Geography ==
Located on the Lena River, Chekurovka is 60 kilometers (37 mi) north of the center of the rural settlements Kyusyur and 188 kilometers (117 mi) southwest of Tiksi.

== History ==
Prior to the dissolution of the village in 1970, Chekurovka was the centre of the Victory collective farm consisting of five reindeer herds, ten hunting areas and three fishing areas capable of producing up to one hundred tons of fish. During its height, approximately one hundred families lived in the village supported by a primary school, club, shop, bakery and medical centre. In 1970, the population was forcibly moved and the village closed whilst nearby an underground nuclear explosion was carried out and a search for oil and gas was made. In 1992, families of former residents decided to resettle the site of the former village, with the site now consisting of two houses, a power plant and storage facilities employing 65 people.
