= Kelimyar =

River in Yakutia (Sakha Republic), Russia

Kelimyar Келимяр / Кэлимээр
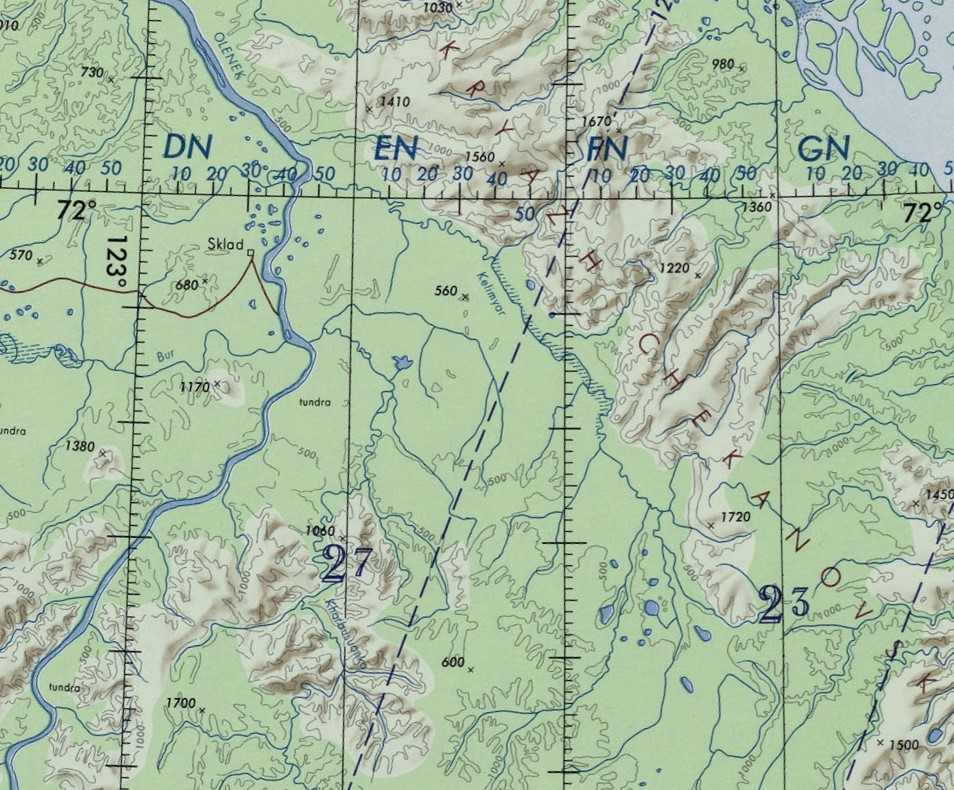
- Course of the Kelimyar ONC map section

- Mouth location in Yakutia, Russia Kelimyar (Russia)

Location
- Country: Russian Federation
- Federal subject: Yakutia
- District: Bulunsky District

Physical characteristics
- Source
  - location: Chekanovsky Ridge
  - coordinates: 71°27′44″N 125°41′38″E
- Mouth: Olenyok
  - coordinates: 72°01′55″N 123°47′20″E
- Length: 254 km (158 mi) (196 km (122 mi))
- Basin size: 4,050 km^{2} (1,560 sq mi)

Basin features
- Progression: Olenyok→Laptev Sea

The Kelimyar (Russian: Келимяр Yakut: Кэлимээр, Kelimeer) is a river in Yakutia (Sakha Republic), Russia. It is a tributary of the Olenyok with a length of 254 kilometres (158 mi) and a drainage basin area of 4,050 square kilometres (1,560 mi^{2}).

The river flows north of the Arctic Circle across a desolate area of Bulunsky District devoid of settlements. The nearest inhabited places are Taymylyr, located downstream from its confluence with the Olenyok, and Sklad (Tyumyati), located a little upstream.

== History ==
In 1875, during his third Siberian expedition, Alexander Chekanovsky intended to "go along the banks of the Lena to the mouth and, if possible, then go to the mouth of the Olenyok from the Laptev Sea."

From a barge Chekanovsky navigated the Lena River for a distance of about 1,200 kilometres (750 mi) from Yakutsk to the mouth to the Eyekit river, its last major left tributary. He explored inland from the deep and wide lower course of the Eyekit, and then along the rocky and mountainous watershed area lying between the Lena and the Olenyok, descending along the Kelimyar river to the Olenyok. In this way he discovered the roughly 350 kilometres (220 mi) long ridge that bears his name. From the Kelimyar he traced the course of the Olenyok to its mouth.

== Course ==
The Kelimyar is a right tributary of the Olenyok. Its sources are in a small lake of the western slopes of the Chekanovsky Ridge. It flows first in a roughly southern direction in its upper course, then it bends northwestwards heading in that direction within a low floodplain with marshes and many small lakes. It meanders strongly in stretches until it joins the right bank of the Olenyok river 186 km (116 mi) upstream of its mouth.

Owing to the harshness of the climate the river is frozen between early October and early June.

=== Tributaries ===
The longest tributaries of the Kelimyar are the 51 kilometres (32 mi) long Muoykanda-Yurege and the 44 kilometres (27 mi) long Khotugu-Muoykanda-Yurege from the right, as well as the 70 kilometres (43 mi) long Nyoyokyu, the 66 kilometres (41 mi) long Olongdo, the 39 kilometres (24 mi) long Mene, the 37 kilometres (23 mi) long Amyday, the 36 kilometres (22 mi) long Bulungkaan-Yurege and the 30 kilometres (19 mi) long Kystyk-Khaya-Yurege from the left.

== See also ==
- List of rivers of Russia
