= Ebelyakh =

Ebelyakh Эбелях
- Selo

Other transcription(s)
  - Yakut: Эбэлээх
- Interactive map of Ebelyakh
- Location of Ebelyakh Ebelyakh (Sakha Republic)
- Coordinates: 70°53′23.7″N 113°31′28.7″E
- Country: Russia
- Federal subject: Sakha Republic
- Administrative district: Anabarsky District
- Rural okrugSelsoviet: Ebelyakhsky Rural Okrug
- Founded: 1984
- Elevation: 79 m (259 ft)

Population (2010 Census)
  - Total: 36
  - Estimate (2021): 0 (−100%)

Administrative status
  - Capital of: Ebelyakhsky Rural Okrug

Municipal status
  - Municipal district: Anabarsky Municipal District
  - Rural settlement: Saskylakhsky Rural Settlement
- Time zone: UTC+
- Postal code: 678442
- OKTMO ID: 98610411106

Ebelyakh (Russian: Эбелях; Yakut: Эбэлээх, romanized: Ebeleex) is a rural locality (a selo), the only inhabited locality, and the administrative center of Ebelyakhsky Rural Okrug of Anabarsky District in the Sakha Republic, Russia, located 160 kilometers (99 mi) from Saskylakh, the administrative center of the district. Its population as of the 2010 Census was 36; down from 988 recorded in the 2002 Census.
