= Chekanovsky Ridge =

Mountain range in Yakutia, Russia

- Кряж Чекановского / Чекановскай томтороот
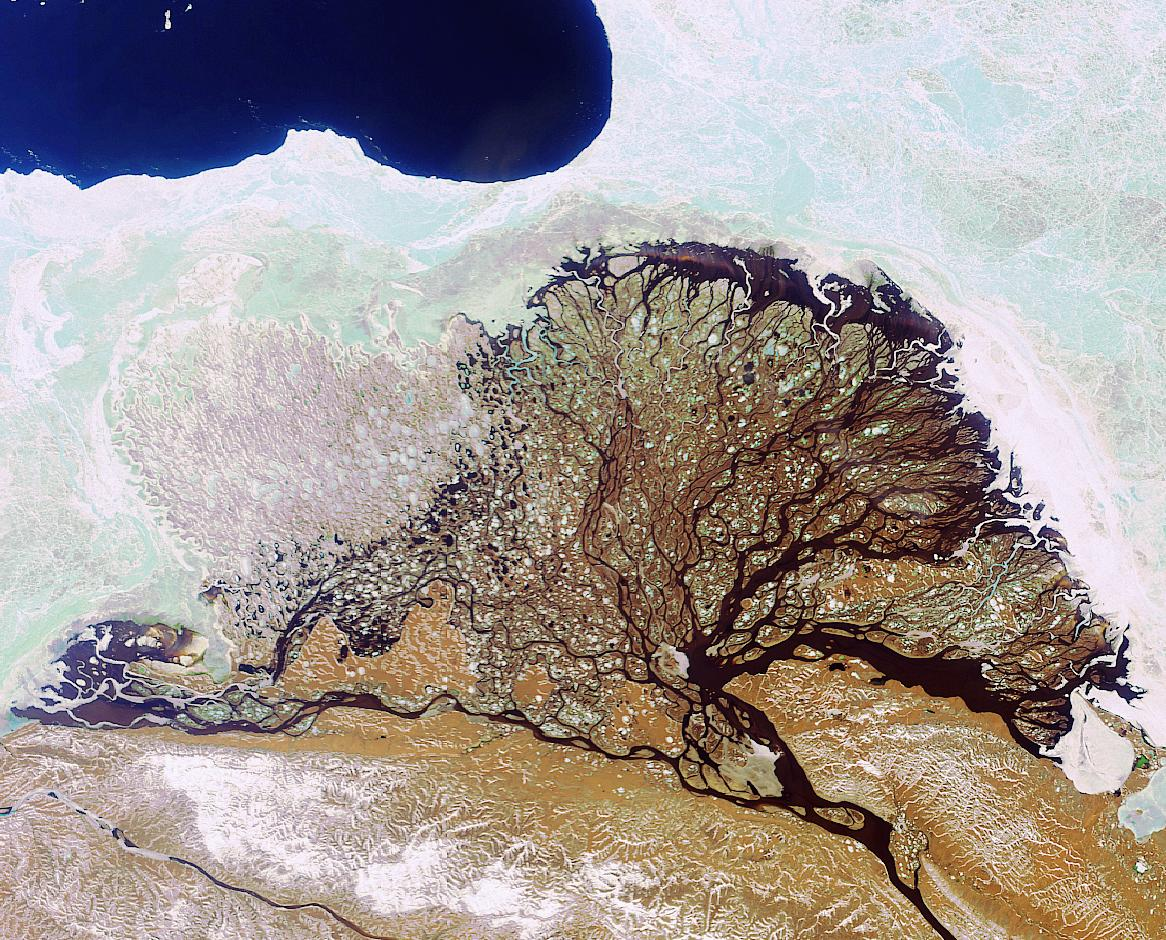
- Lena River Delta Envisat image with the Chekanovsky Ridge at the bottom

Highest point
- Peak: Unnamed
- Elevation: 539 m (1,768 ft)
- Coordinates: 72°41′55″N 123°13′15″E

Dimensions
- Length: 325 km (202 mi) NW/SE
- Width: 40 km (25 mi) NE/SW

Geography
- Location within Far Eastern Federal District Location within Sakha Republic
- Location: Yakutia, Russia
- Range coordinates: 71°45′N 126°0′E
- Parent range: Central Siberian Plateau

Geology
- Orogeny: Alpine orogeny
- Rock age: Mesozoic
- Rock type(s): Sandstone, clay, shale, siltstone

Climbing
- Easiest route: From Kyusyur

The Chekanovsky Ridge (Russian: Кряж Чекановского; Yakut: Чекановскай томтороот, romanized: Çekanovskay tomtoroot) is a range of mountains in the Bulunsky District, Yakutia, Russian Federation. The area of the range is uninhabited.

The range was named after explorer of Siberia Alexander Chekanovsky (1833–1876).

== History ==
Rising in a remote and unexplored area, the range was formerly unknown. In 1875, during his third Siberian expedition, Alexander Chekanovsky intended to "go along the banks of the Lena to the mouth and, if possible, then go to the mouth of the Olenyok from the Laptev Sea." He hoped to have time to conduct geological exploration of the banks of the Lena River before the onset of winter, but a short summer frustrated his plans. From a barge Chekanovsky navigated the Lena River for a distance of about 1,200 kilometres (750 mi) from Yakutsk to the mouth to the Eyekit river, its last major left tributary. He explored inland from the deep and wide lower course of the Eyekit, and then along the rocky and mountainous watershed area lying between the Lena and the Olenyok, descending along the Kelimyar river to the Olenyok. In this way he discovered a roughly 350 kilometres (220 mi) long ridge. From the Kelimyar he traced the course of the Olenyok to its mouth. By the 26 August Chekanovsky saw the ocean from the top of Mount Karanchat.

By the 18 September the expedition was already in Bulun, having safely travelled along the frozen Lena. Chekanovsky went across the mountains and tundra terrain by reindeer reaching Irkutsk on 20 December 1875. The mountain chain that Chekanovsky had discovered was later named Chekanovsky Ridge at the suggestion of Russian Arctic explorer Edward Toll.

== Geography ==
The Chekanovsky Ridge is located about 600 kilometres (370 mi) north of the Arctic Circle, It rises by the northern end of the Lena, west of the last section of its course and southwest of its delta. The Laptev Sea lies to the north beyond the delta and the Kharaulakh Range stretches along the facing bank of the Lena. The Olenyok flows to the west and the Kystyk Plateau (Плато Кыстык) rises in the southwest.

Elevations range between 450 metres (1,480 ft) and 500 metres (1,600 ft). The highest point of the range is an unnamed peak reaching 539 metres (1,768 ft) located near the northern end. The slopes look barren and are covered mainly with lichen bush tundra.

=== Hydrography ===
From the eastern slopes of the Chekanovsky Ridge originate small tributaries of the Lena, the largest of which is the Ulakhan-Yuryakh. The Eyekit river cuts eastwards across the southern part. The Kelimyar, one of the right tributaries of the Olenyok, has its sources in the western flank of the ridge and the Bulkur in the eastern.

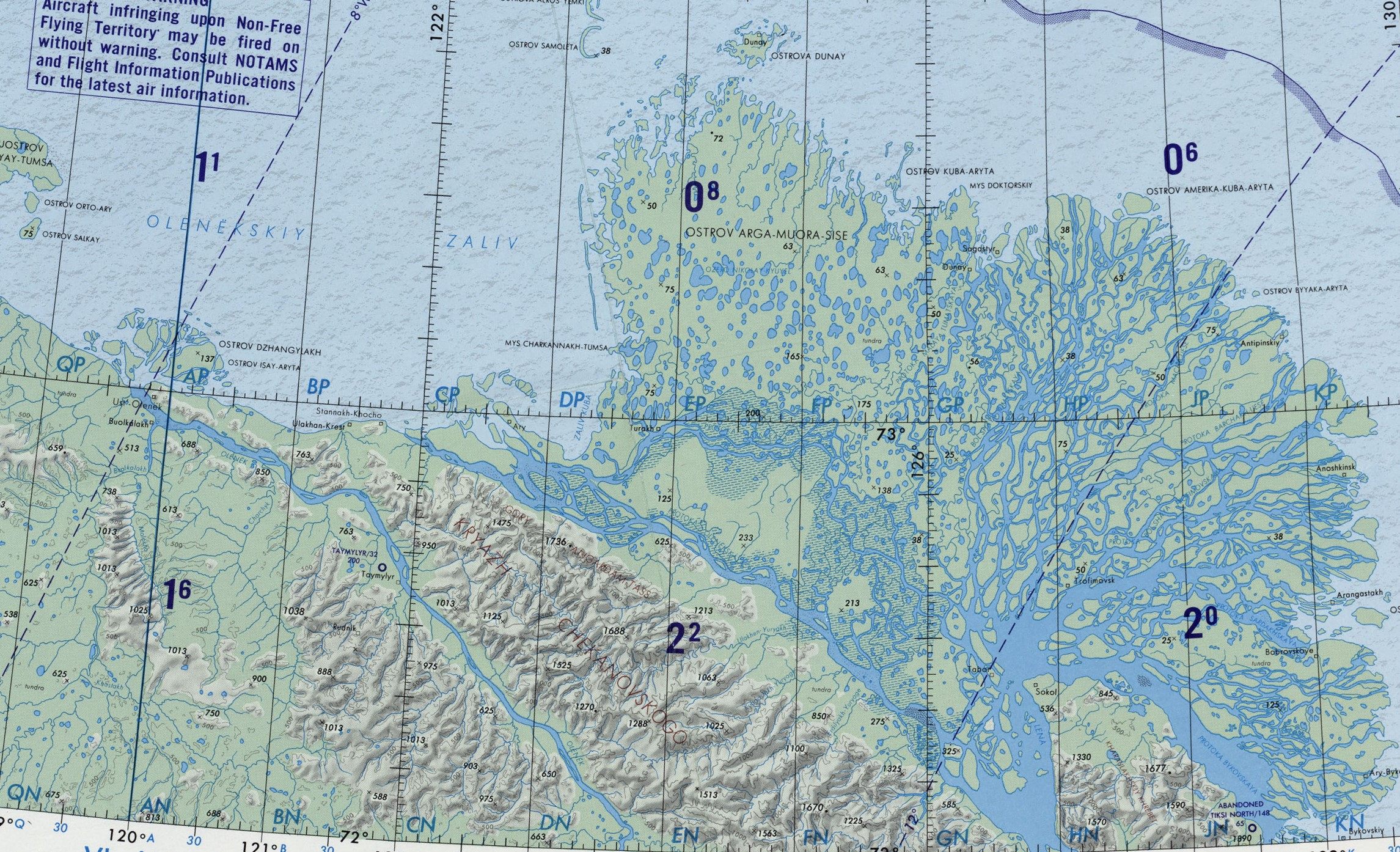
Northern part of the Chekanovsky Ridge and Lena Delta.

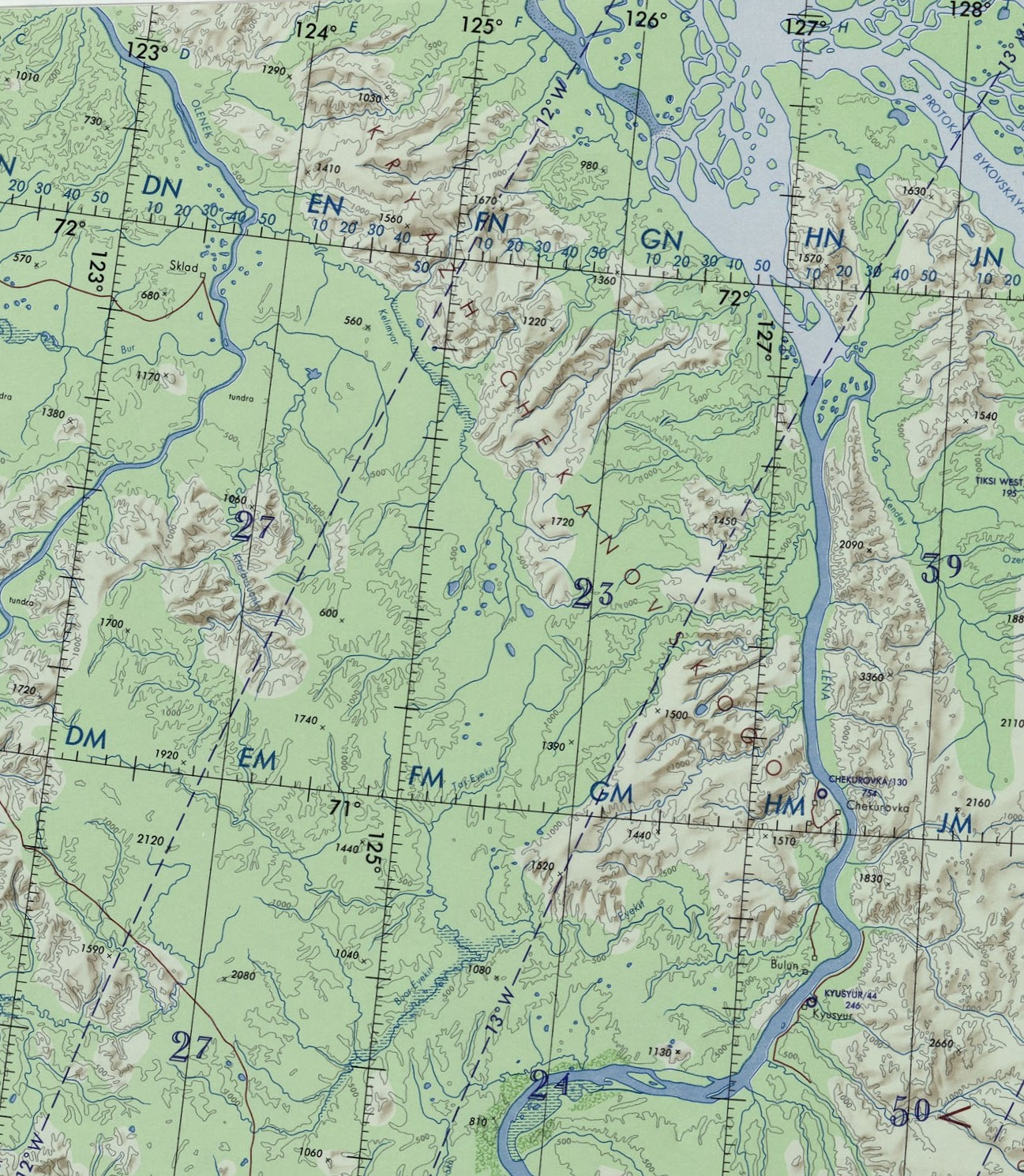
Southern part of the Chekanovsky Ridge

== See also ==
- List of mountains and hills of Russia
