= Sklad =

Sklad Тюмяти
- Selo
- Interactive map of Sklad
- Location of Sklad Sklad (Sakha Republic)
- Coordinates: 71°55′N 123°35′E
- Country: Russia
- Federal subject: Sakha Republic
- Administrative district: Bulunsky District
- Rural okrugSelsoviet: Tumatsky Rural Okrug

Population (2010 Census)
  - Total: 10
  - Estimate (2021): 6 (−40%)

Administrative status
  - Capital of: Tumatsky Rural Okrug

Municipal status
  - Municipal district: Bulunsky Municipal District
  - Rural settlement: Tyumetinsky Rural Settlement
  - Capital of: Tyumetinsky Rural Settlement
- Time zone: UTC+
- Postal code: 678423
- OKTMO ID: 98612445106

Sklad or Tyumyati (Russian: Тюмяти; Yakut: Тумат, Tumat) is a rural locality (a selo), the only inhabited locality, and the administrative center of Tumatsky Rural Okrug of Bulunsky District in the Sakha Republic, Russia, located 290 kilometers (180 mi) from Tiksi, the administrative center of the district. Its population as of the 2010 Census was 10, up from 9 recorded during the 2002 Census.

== Geography ==
Sklad lies north of the Arctic Circle, on the left bank of the Olenyok River, upstream of its confluence with the Kelimyar. The nearest settlement is Taymylyr located further downriver.
