= Saskylakh Airport =

- IATA: SYS; ICAO: UERS; LID: СЫХ

Summary
- Airport type: Public
- Serves: Saskylakh, Anabarsky District, Sakha Republic, Russia
- Coordinates: 71°55′44″N 114°04′56″E

Maps
- Sakha Republic in Russia

- Location of the airport in the Sakha Republic

Runways
Direction	Length		Surface
Direction	m	ft	Surface
18/36	1,600	5,249	Asphalt
- Source: OurAirports, GCM, STV

Saskylakh Airport (IATA: SYS, ICAO: UERS) is a public use international airport in Saskylakh, Anabarsky District, in the Sakha Republic of Russia.

== Airlines and destinations ==
Airlines	Destinations
Polar Airlines	Yakutsk

== See also ==
- List of airports in Russia
