= Pronchishcheva Bay =

Bay

- Бухта Прончищевой
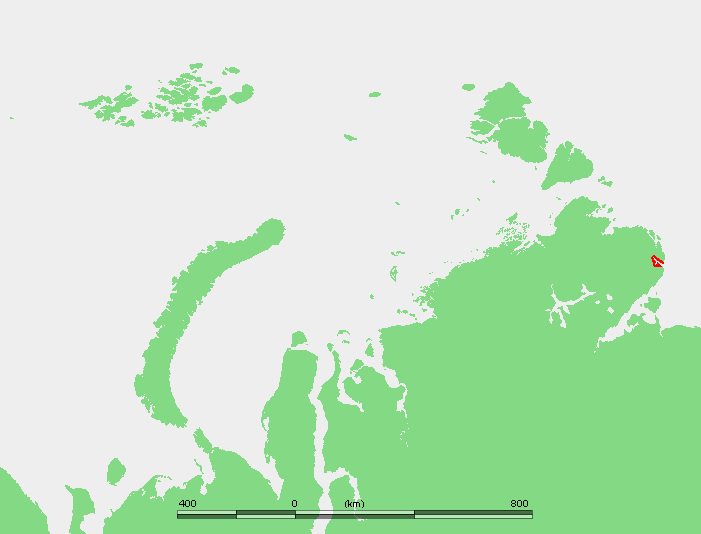
- Location of Pronchishcheva Bay

- Location of the bay in Krasnoyarsk Krai
- Location: Far North
- Coordinates: 75.6333°N 112.967°E
- Ocean/sea sources: Laptev Sea
- Basin countries: Russia
- Max. length: 60 km (37 mi)
- Max. width: 4 km (2.5 mi)
- Settlements: None

Pronchishcheva Bay (Russian: Бухта Прончищевой, or Bukhta Pronchishchevoy), also mistakenly known as Maria Pronchishcheva Bay, is a body of water in Krasnoyarsk Krai, Russian Federation.

It was named after pioneering Russian explorer Vasili Pronchishchev's wife Tatiana.

== Geography ==
Pronchishcheva Bay is a deep sound or inlet in the southwestern shore of the Laptev Sea. It is located about 75 km north of the mouth of the Khatanga Gulf, on the eastern side of the Taymyr Peninsula. It is narrow (about 4 km in average) and long (about 60 km from the mouth to its deepest recess). Lat 75° 45' and long 113°.

The Byrranga Mountains rise to the west and quite a few rivers, two of them of considerable size, flow into it from the west and the southwest.

== Climate ==
The climate in the area is exceptionally severe, with prolonged, bitter winters, so that the inlet is covered by ice most of the year.

== History ==
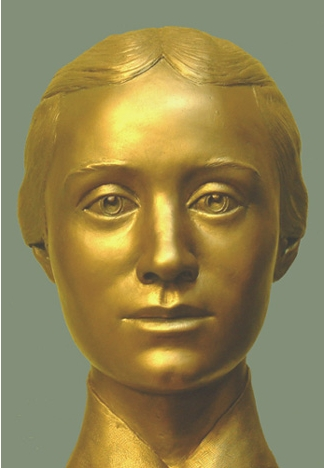
Tatiana Pronchishcheva (forensic facial reconstruction)

In 1933 icebreaker Rusanov, commanded by Captain Yerokhin brought a party led by S. P. Zhuravlev to Pronchishcheva Bay and unloaded men, women and materials there. The plan was to establish a permanent base camp in the shores of the inlet in order to exploit the resources of this area of the Soviet Arctic. The men were experienced in trapping and the idea was that they should get their own food.

In the spring of the following year, several of the 21 people of the base (ten men, four women and seven children) were afflicted with scurvy. They were healed by Dr. Urvantseva, who travelled by dogsled from the provisional wintering station that had been set by her husband scientist Nikolay Urvantsev at the Komsomolskaya Pravda Islands the same year. The doctor stayed 11 days at the Bukhta Pronchishchevoy camp until she could see clear signs of improvement as a result of the dietary changes prescribed by her.

During the 1930s the whole area surrounding Pronchishcheva Bay experienced a limited boom owing to the first icebreaker convoys plying the Northern Sea Route. Tiksi Bay and Mys Shmidta had become airports and nearby Nordvik was "a growing town."

== See also ==
- Ust-Olenyok

== Bibliography ==
- William Barr, The First Soviet Convoy to the Mouth of the Lena.
