= Vasili Pronchishchev =

Russian explorer

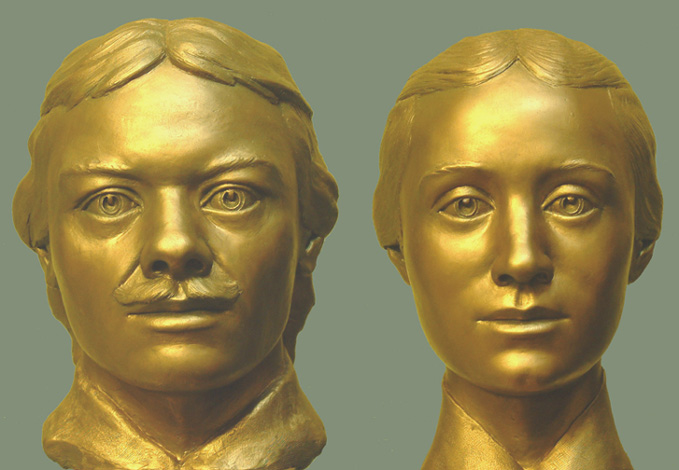
Vasiliy and his wife. Forensic facial reconstruction

Vasili Vasilyevich Pronchishchev (Russian: Васи́лий Васи́льевич Про́нчищев) (1702–9 September [O.S. 29 August] 1736) was a Russian explorer.

In 1718, Vasili Pronchishchev graduated from Moscow School of Mathematics and Navigation and was promoted to naval cadet. In 1733, he was promoted to the rank of lieutenant and appointed head of one of the units of the Second Kamchatka Expedition, the purpose of which was to map the shores of the Arctic Ocean from the mouth of the Lena to the mouth of the Yenisey.

In 1735, Vasili Pronchishchev went down the Lena River (from Yakutsk) on his sloop Yakutsk, doubled its delta, and stopped for wintering at the mouth of the Olenek River. Many members of the crew fell ill and died, mainly owing to scurvy. Despite the difficulties, in 1736, he reached the eastern shore of the Taymyr Peninsula and went north along its coastline. Finally Pronchishchev and his wife Tatiana Feodorovna succumbed to scurvy and died on the way back.

Despite the death toll, the expedition was successful regarding the fulfillment of its goals. During his journey, Vasili Pronchishchev discovered a number of islands off the northeastern coast of the Taymyr Peninsula (Faddey Islands, Komsomolskoy Pravdy Islands, Saint Peter Islands). His expedition was the first to accurately map the Lena River from Yakutsk to its estuary and the Laptev seacoast from the Lena's mouth to the Gulf of Faddey. Pronchishchev's wife Tatiana Pronchishcheva (died 12(23) September 1736), who took part in his expedition, is considered the first female polar explorer. After their deaths, both of them were interred at the mouth of the Olenek River.

Further information is now available from the Hakluit Society via a summary written by William Barr in July 2018, "The Arctic Detachments of the Russian Great Northern Expedition (1733–43) and their largely forgotten and even Clandestine Predecessors". On page 12 of the summary is shown information and maps on the Lena-Khatanga detachment led by Pronchishchev.

A part of the eastern coastline of the Taymyr Peninsula and a ridge between the mouths of the Olenek and Anabar Rivers bear Vasili Pronchishchev's name. The 1961-built icebreaker Ledokol-1 was renamed Vasiliy Pronchishchev in 1996 after this pioneering Arctic explorer.

Pronchishcheva Bay in the Laptev Sea is named after his wife Tatiana.
