= Vasiliy Pronchishchev (icebreaker) =

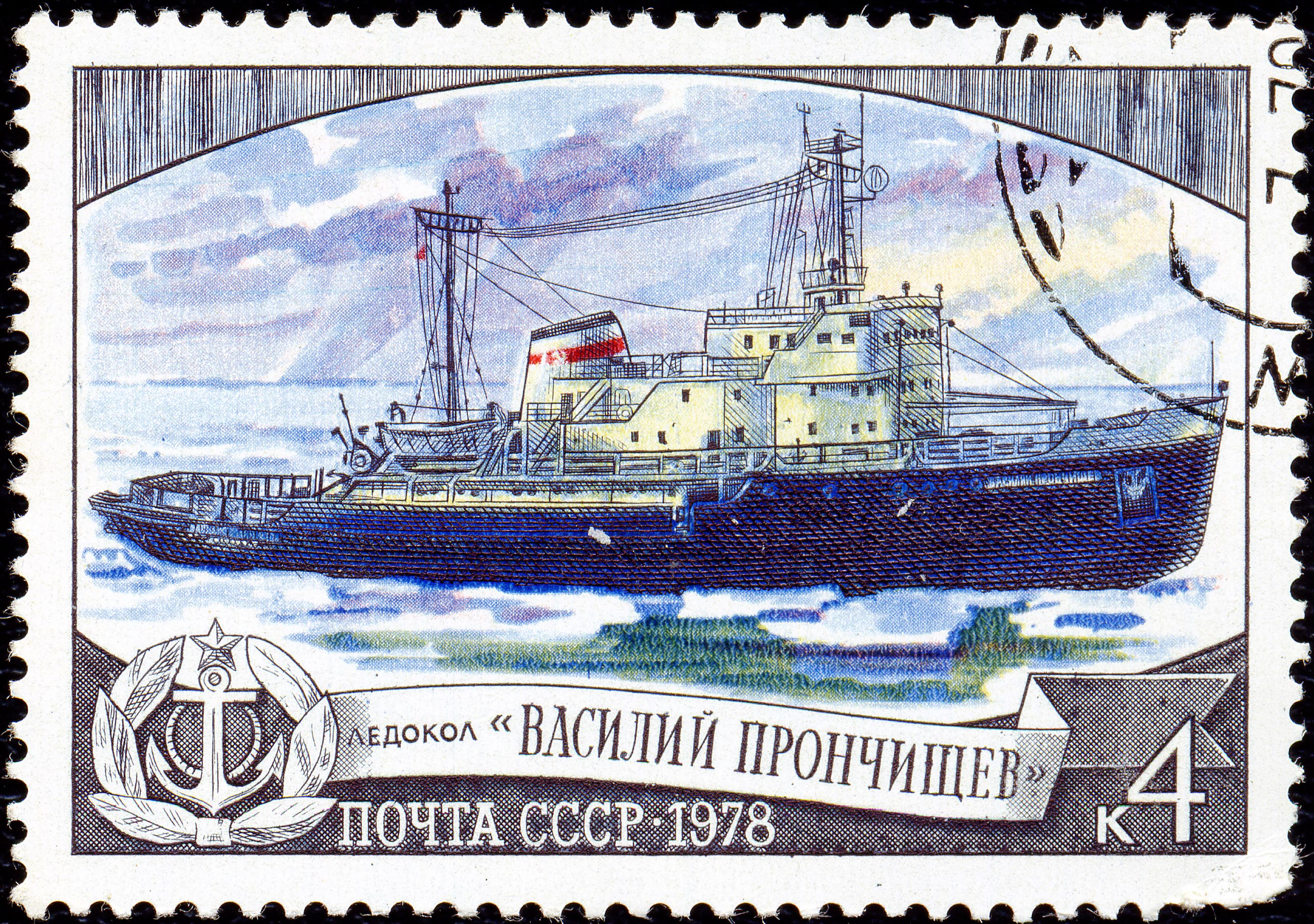

History

Soviet Union
- Name: Ledokol-1 (Ледокол-1) (1961–1966); Vasiliy Pronchischev (Василий Прончищев) (1966–1989)
- Namesake: Vasili Pronchishchev
- Owner: Northern Shipping Company
- Port of registry: Arkhangelsk, Soviet Union
- Builder: Admiralty Shipyard (Leningrad, USSR)
- Yard number: 762
- Laid down: 13 December 1960
- Launched: 28 April 1961
- Completed: 30 December 1961
- Decommissioned: 1989
- In service: 1961–1989
- Identification: IMO number: 6500765
- Fate: Broken up

General characteristics
- Class & type: Dobrynya Nikitich-class icebreaker
- Displacement: 2,935 t (2,889 long tons)
- Length: 67.7 m (222 ft)
- Beam: 18 m (59 ft)
- Draught: 5.35 m (17.6 ft)
- Depth: 8.3 m (27.2 ft)
- Installed power: 3 × 13D100 (3 × 1,800 hp)
- Propulsion: Diesel-electric; three shafts (2 × 2,400 hp + 1,600 hp)
- Speed: 15 knots (28 km/h; 17 mph)
- Range: 5,700 nautical miles (10,600 km; 6,600 mi) at 13 knots (24 km/h; 15 mph)
- Endurance: 17 days
- Complement: 42

Vasiliy Pronchishchev (Russian: Василий Прончищев) was a Soviet icebreaker in service from 1961 until 1989. It was the first of twelve Project 97A icebreakers built by Admiralty Shipyard in Leningrad in 1961–1971.

== Description ==
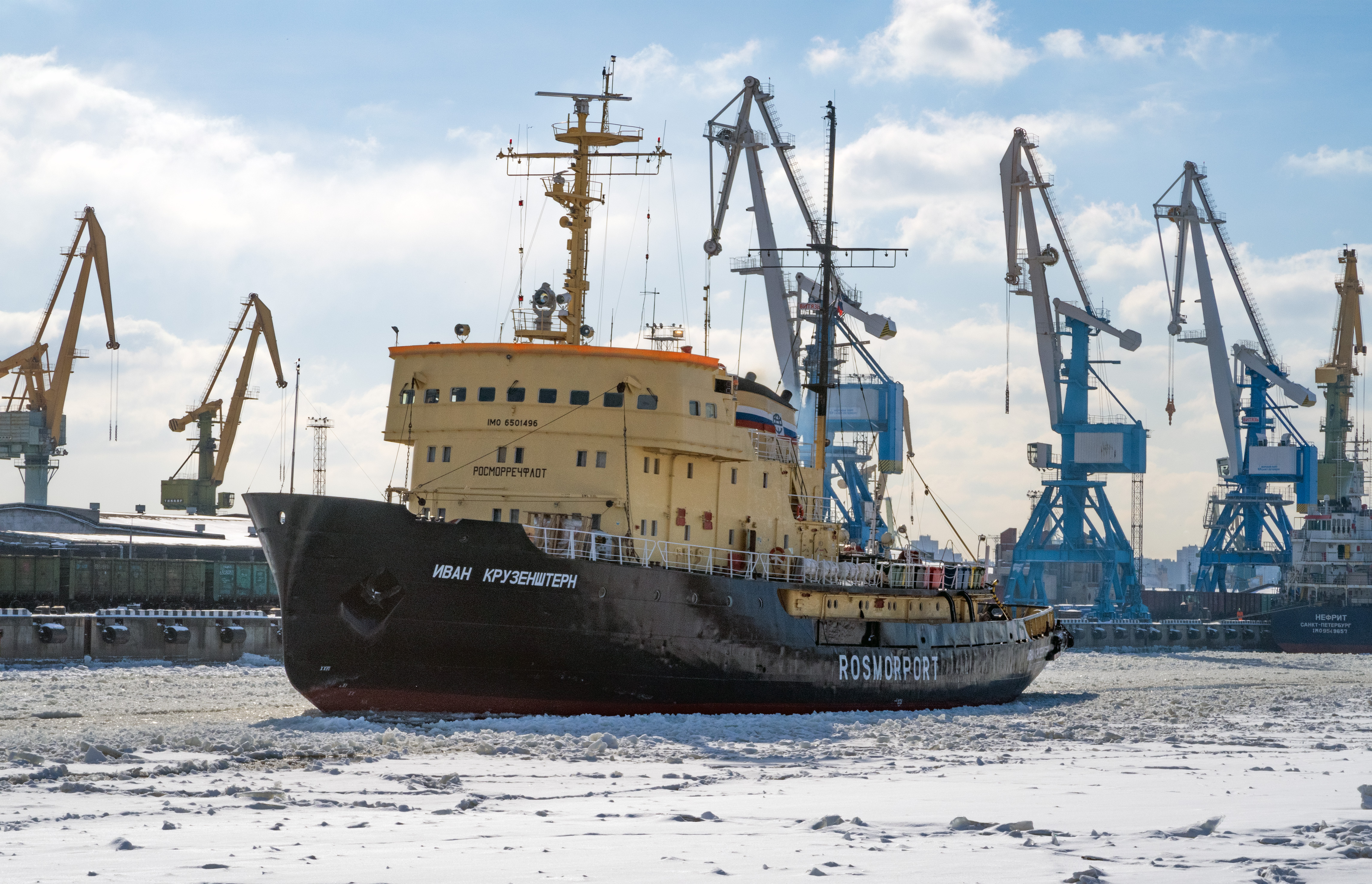
Ivan Kruzenstern, a similar Project 97A icebreaker

In the mid-1950s, the Soviet Union began developing a new diesel-electric icebreaker design based on the 1942-built steam-powered icebreaker Eisbär to meet the needs of both civilian and naval operators. Built in various configurations until the early 1980s, the Project 97 icebreakers and their derivatives became the largest and longest-running class of icebreakers and icebreaking vessels built in the world. Of the 32 ships built in total, the unarmed civilian variant Project 97A was the most numerous with twelve icebreakers built in 1961–1971.

Project 97A icebreakers were 67.7 metres (222 ft) long overall and had a beam of 18 metres (59 ft). Fully laden, the vessels drew 5.35 metres (17.6 ft) of water and had a displacement of 2,935 tonnes (2,889 long tons). Their three 1,800-horsepower (1,300 kW) 10-cylinder 13D100 two-stroke opposed-piston diesel engines were coupled to generators that powered electric propulsion motors driving two propellers in the stern and a third one in the bow. Project 97A icebreakers were capable of breaking 70 to 75 centimetres (28 to 30 in) thick snow-covered ice at very slow but continuous speed.

== History ==
The first of twelve Project 97A icebreakers was laid down at Admiralty Shipyard in Leningrad on 13 December 1960, launched on 28 April 1961, and delivered to the Northern Shipping Company on 30 December 1961. Initially named simply Ledokol-1 (Russian: Ледокол-1), Russian for "icebreaker", it was renamed Vasiliy Pronchishchev in 1966 after the 18th century Russian explorer. The icebreaker was stationed in Arkhangelsk and operated primarily in the Northern Dvina estuary and the White Sea.

Vasiliy Pronchishchev was taken out of service following a fire in January 1989 and sold for scrapping in Portugal later that year.
