= Yuryung-Khaya =

Yuryung-Khaya Юрюнг-Хая Үрүҥ Хайа (Sakha)
- Selo
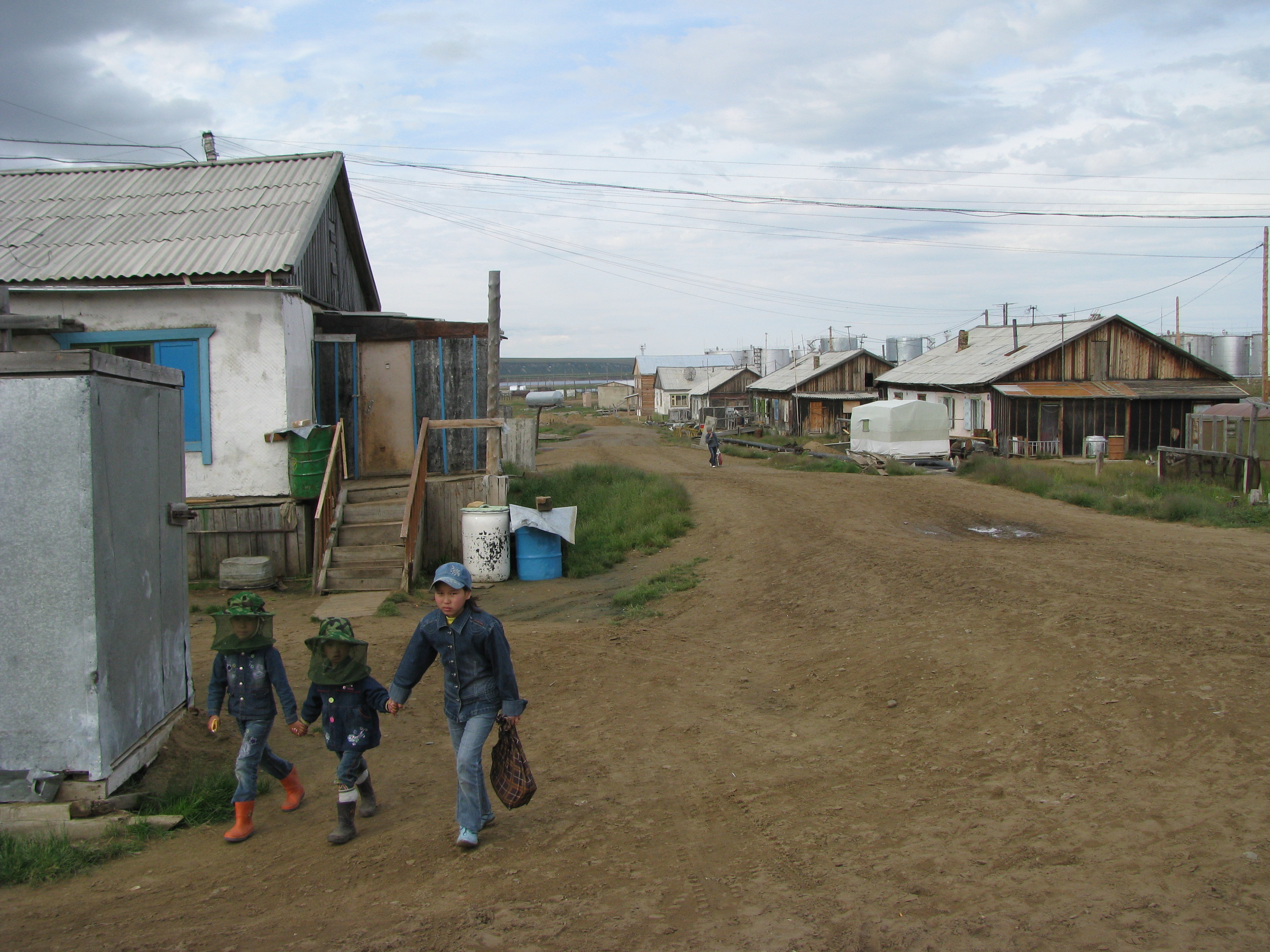
- Street scene, Yuryung-Khaya
- Interactive map of Yuryung-Khaya
- Location of Yuryung-Khaya Yuryung-Khaya (Sakha Republic)
- Coordinates: 72°48′43″N 113°13′56″E
- Country: Russia
- Federal subject: Sakha Republic
- Administrative district: Anabarsky District
- Rural okrugSelsoviet: Yuryung-Khainsky National (Dolgan) Rural Okrug
- Founded: 1930
- Elevation: 25 m (82 ft)

Population (2010 Census)
  - Total: 1,148
  - Estimate (January 2016): 1,120 (−2.4%)

Administrative status
  - Capital of: Yuryung-Khainsky National (Dolgan) Rural Okrug

Municipal status
  - Municipal district: Anabarsky Municipal District
  - Rural settlement: Yuryung-Khainsky National (Dolgan) Rural Settlement
  - Capital of: Yuryung-Khainsky National (Dolgan) Rural Settlement
- Time zone: UTC+
- Postal code: 678431
- OKTMO ID: 98610424101

Yuryung-Khaya (Russian: Юрюнг-Хая, Yakut: Үрүҥ Хайа Ürüŋ xaya) is a rural locality (a selo), the only inhabited locality, and the administrative center of Yuryung-Khainsky National (Dolgan) Rural Okrug of Anabarsky District in the Sakha Republic, Russia, located 160 kilometers (99 mi) from Saskylakh, the administrative center of the district.

Its population as of the 2010 Census was 1,148, of whom 552 were male and 596 female, up from 1,051 recorded during the 2002 Census. Yuryung-Khaya is the only settlement in the Sakha Republic with a population composed mainly of Dolgans, and also the only substantial population of Dolgans outside the Krasnoyarsk Kray.

== Geography ==
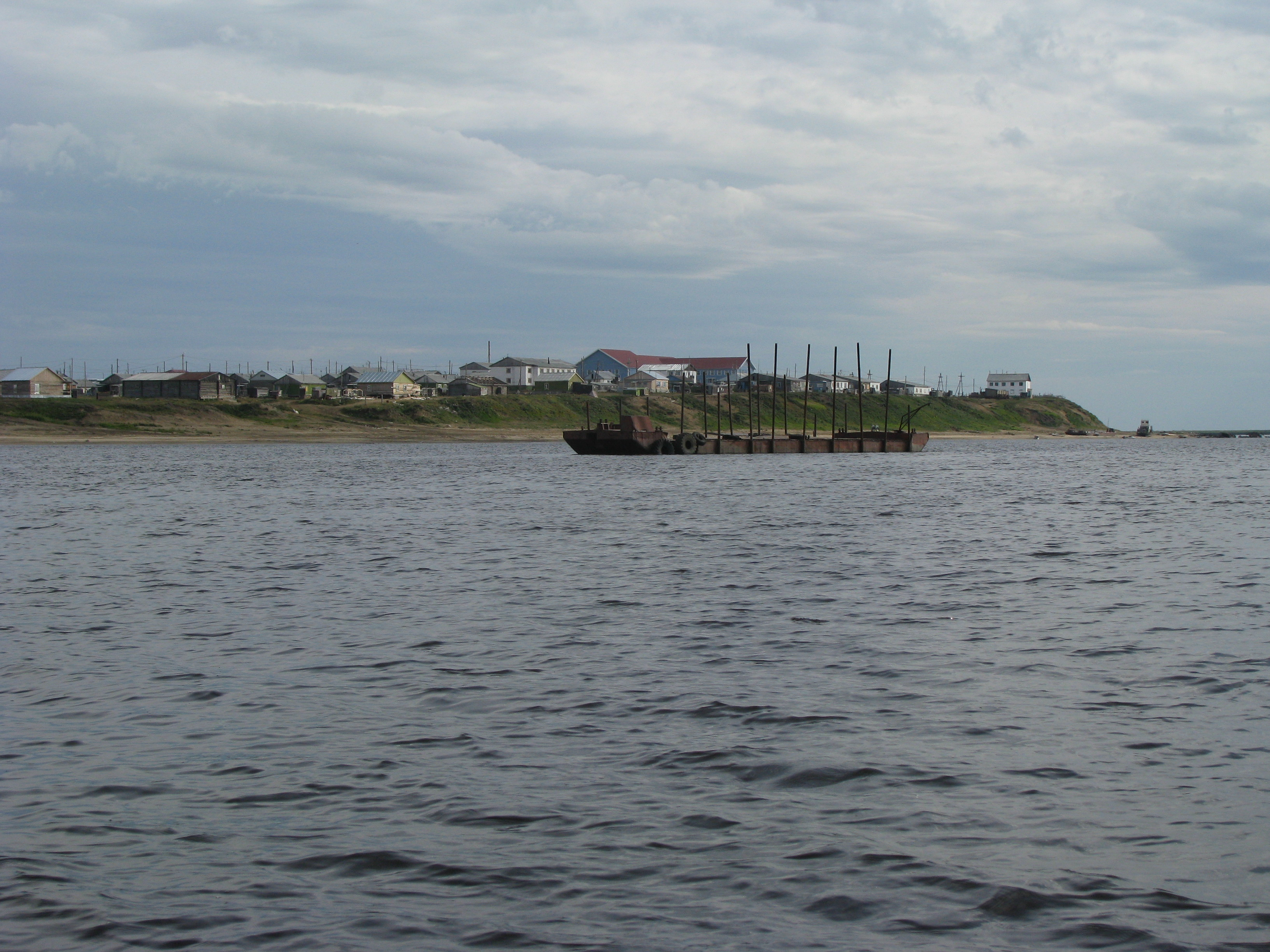
View of Yuryung-Khaya from the Anabar River

The village is situated on the right bank of the Anabar River, shortly before it flows into the Laptev Sea.

=== Climate ===
Owing to the extreme northern location Yuryung-Khaya has a cold and dry polar climate (Köppen ET) with severely cold winters and cool summers.

Climate data for Anabar River near Yuryung-Khaya (73°13N, 113°30E)
Month	Jan	Feb	Mar	Apr	May	Jun	Jul	Aug	Sep	Oct	Nov	Dec	Year
Daily mean °C (°F)	−32.7 (−26.9)	−32.9 (−27.2)	−28.1 (−18.6)	−18.7 (−1.7)	−7.7 (18.1)	3.3 (37.9)	8.9 (48.0)	7.3 (45.1)	1.2 (34.2)	−11.5 (11.3)	−24.4 (−11.9)	−30.3 (−22.5)	−13.8 (7.2)
Source: normals_1991_2020

== History ==
The village was founded in 1930 as part of Soviet efforts to settle the nomadic indigenous inhabitants of the region. The village's name means White Mountain in the Yakut and Dolgan languages.
