= Tatiana Pronchishcheva =

Russian explorer

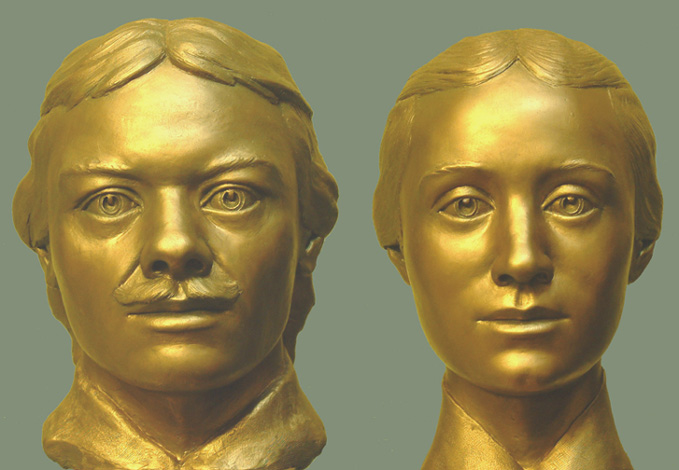
Tatiana Pronchishcheva (right) and her husband. Forensic facial reconstruction.

Tatiana Fyodorovna Pronchishcheva (Russian: Татьяна Фёдоровна Прончищева); before 1713 – 23 September [O.S. 12 September] 1736), also mistakenly known as Maria Pronchishcheva (Russian: Мария Прончищева), was a Russian explorer. She is considered the first female polar explorer.

== Life ==
Tatiana Kondyreva was born in Beryozovo near Aleksin in the family of Fyodor Stepanovich Kondyrev. In 1721, her family moved to Kronstadt, where Tatiana met Vasili Pronchishchev. They married in May 1733. Soon Tatiana joined her husband in the Great Northern Expedition.

In 1735, Pronchishcheva and her husband Vasili Pronchishchev went down the Lena River from Yakutsk on Vasili's sloop Yakutsk, doubled its delta, and stopped for wintering at the mouth of the Olenyok River. Many members of the crew fell ill and died, mainly owing to scurvy. Despite the difficulties, in 1736, they reached the eastern shore of the Taymyr Peninsula and went north along its coastline. However, Pronchishcheva and her husband succumbed to scurvy and died on the way back.

== Name ==
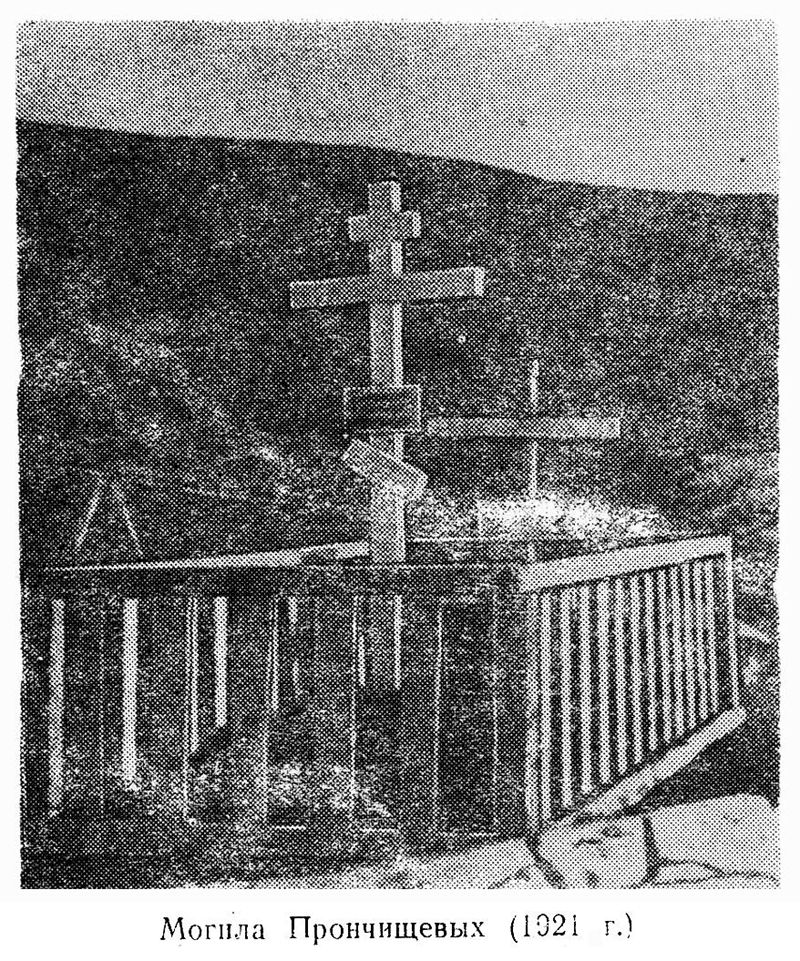
1921 picture of the burial site of Vasili and Tatiana Pronchishchev in Ust-Olenyok. The grave was moved after the bodies were exhumed in 1999.

Pronchishcheva is not mentioned in either her husband's reports or the ones of Chelyuskin, Bering or Chirikov. Even the record of her death in the logbook of Yakutsk does not contain her first name.

In 1913, the Arctic Ocean Hydrographic Expedition named the cape at the entrance to one of the nameless bays on the Taymyr coast in her honor. It was marked on maps as "m. Pronchishchevoy" (where "m." stands for mys, Russian for cape, and "-oy" ending denotes genitive case). When preparing the map for publication, it was perceived as belonging to the bay and transformed into “M. Pronchishcheva Bay”. The letter M was decoded into "Maria". Her real name, Tatiana, was revealed in 1983 research by V.V. Bogdanov.
