= Nayba =

Nayba Найба
- Selo

Other transcription(s)
  - Yakut: Ньаайба
- Interactive map of Nayba
- Location of Nayba Nayba (Sakha Republic)
- Coordinates: 70°50′48″N 130°45′17″E
- Country: Russia
- Federal subject: Sakha Republic
- Administrative district: Bulunsky District
- Rural okrugSelsoviet: Khara-Ulakhsky Rural Okrug
- Founded: 1931

Population (2010 Census)
  - Total: 522
  - Estimate (January 2016): 479 (−8.2%)

Administrative status
  - Capital of: Khara-Ulakhsky Rural Okrug

Municipal status
  - Municipal district: Bulunsky Municipal District
  - Rural settlement: Khara-Ulakhsky Rural Settlement
  - Capital of: Khara-Ulakhsky Rural Settlement
- Time zone: UTC+
- Postal code: 678410
- OKTMO ID: 98612456101

Nayba (Russian: Найба; Yakut: Ньаайба, romanized: Ñaayba) is a rural locality (a selo), the only inhabited locality, and the administrative center of Khara-Ulakhsky Rural Okrug of Bulunsky District in the Sakha Republic, Russia. It is 112 kilometers (70 mi) from Tiksi, the administrative center of the district. Its population as of the 2010 Census was 522, up from 500 recorded during the 2002 Census.

Historical population
Year	Pop.	±%
2002	500	—
2010	522	+4.4%
2021	473	−9.4%
Source: Census data
