= Saint Peter Islands =

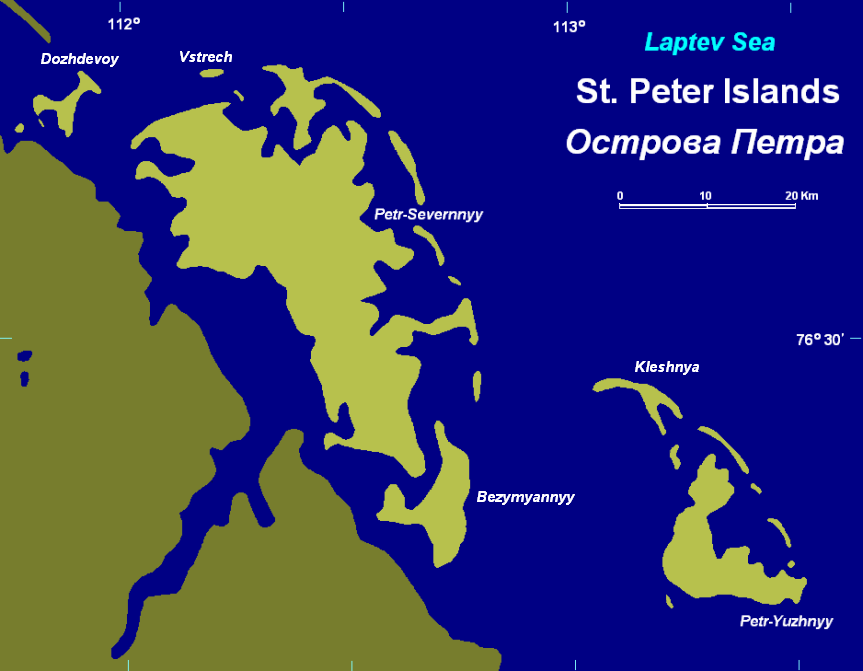
- The Saint Peter Islands at the northeastern end of the Taymyr Peninsula

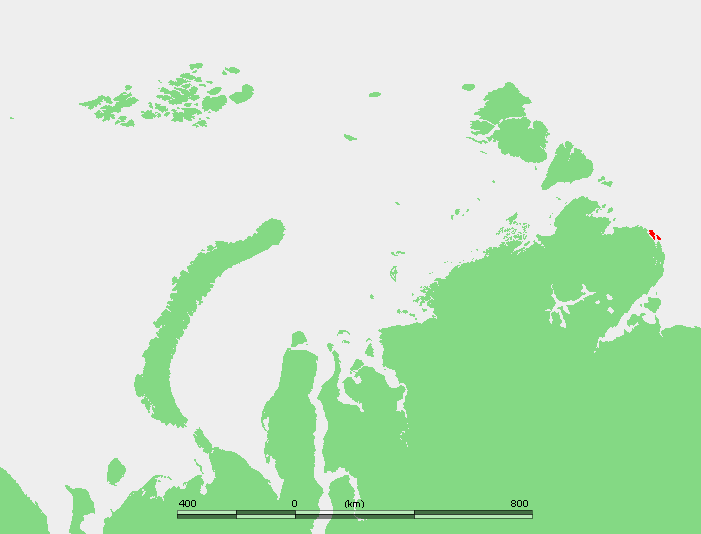

Geography
- Location: Laptev Sea
- Coordinates: 76°35′N 113°0′E
- Archipelago: Saint Peter Islands
- Total islands: 19

Administration
- Russia
- Krai: Krasnoyarsk Krai

Demographics
- Population: uninhabited

The Saint Peter Islands, also known as Saint Petra Islands or Petra Islands (Russian: Острова Петра, Ostrova Petra) are two islands covered with tundra vegetation, shingle and ice. These islands, as well as some other islands nearby (Ostrova Andreia, Ostrov Pavla) were originally named after Christian Apostles. The climate is Arctic and severe with frequent blizzards in the winter. The sea surrounding these Islands is covered with fast ice most of the year and is obstructed by pack ice even in the summer, so that these islands are merged with the mainland and animals can go across the ice.

This island group belongs to the Krasnoyarsk Krai administrative division of Russia. None of these islands have had much historical importance, except for the fact that they are located very close to the Northern Sea Route.

== Geography ==
The Saint Peter Islands are surrounded by narrow beach ridges and swales. They are located in the Laptev Sea coastal region, off the eastern shores of the Taymyr Peninsula, between Pronchishcheva Bay and Faddey Bay.

- The largest island is Ostrov Petr-Severnyy with a surface of 175 km^{2}. It is located very close to the coast, separated from it by a sound that is only 1.2 km wide in its narrowest point. The latitude of this island is 76° 40' N and its longitude 112° 25' E.
- Ostrov Petr-Yuzhnyy is significantly smaller than its northern neighbor. It is located 9 km to the SW of Ostrov Petr-Severnyy and it is farther offshore. The latitude is 76° 20' N and its longitude 113° 15' E.
- Other lesser islands in the Saint Peter group are Dozhdevoy, Vstrech, Bezymyannyy, Serpovidnyy and Kleshnya.

=== Other adjacent coastal islands ===
- Saint Andrew Island (Остров Андрея; Ostrov Andreia) is an island of similar characteristics lying about 40 km further northwest along the coast. This island, Paul Island (Остров Павла; Ostrov Pavla) and Koshka Island (Остров Кошка; Ostrov Koshka), a neighboring long and narrow coastal island, are sometimes included as part of the same group, the Saint Andrew Islands (Острова Андрея; Ostrova Andreia).
- Vos'mogo Marta Island (Остров Восьмого Марта) is located only 8.5 km to the south of Petr-Yuzhnyy's SW end.
- Psov Island (Остров Псов) is 4 km long and 3 km wide. It lies further down the coast, 43 km from Petr-Yuzhnyy's southeastern point.

== See also ==
- List of islands by area
