= Taymylyr =

Taymylyr Таймылыр
- Selo

Other transcription(s)
  - Sakha: Таймылыыр
- Interactive map of Taymylyr
- Location of Taymylyr Taymylyr (Sakha Republic)
- Coordinates: 72°37′N 121°55′E
- Country: Russia
- Federal subject: Sakha Republic
- Administrative district: Bulunsky District
- Rural okrugSelsoviet: Tyumetinsky Rural Okrug
- Founded: 1930

Population (2010 Census)
  - Total: 757
  - Estimate (2021): 769 (+1.6%)

Administrative status
  - Capital of: Tyumetinsky Rural Okrug

Municipal status
  - Municipal district: Bulunsky Municipal District
  - Rural settlement: Tyumetinsky Rural Settlement
  - Capital of: Tyumetinsky Rural Settlement
- Time zone: UTC+
- Postal code: 678414
- OKTMO ID: 98612445101

Taymylyr (Russian: Таймылыр; Yakut: Таймылыыр, romanized: Taymılıır) is a rural locality (a selo) and the administrative center of Tyumetinsky Rural Okrug of Bulunsky District in the Sakha Republic, Russia, located 190 kilometers (120 mi) from Tiksi, the administrative center of the district. Its population as of the 2010 Census was 757, down from 900 recorded during the 2002 Census.

== Geography ==
Taymylyr lies north of the Arctic Circle, on the left bank of the Olenyok River, downstream of its confluence with the Kelimyar. The nearest settlement is Ust-Olenyok located further downriver.

== Demographics ==
According to the 2010 Census, the vast majority of the rural okrug's population was composed of indigenous Siberian peoples, with Evenks making up 48%, and Evens and Yakuts around 22% each.

== Economy and infrastructure ==
The local economy is based on reindeer herding, hunting, and fishing.

== Climate ==
Taymylyr lies on the July 10 °C isotherm and has a tundra climate (ET) closely bordering on a subarctic climate (Dfd).

Climate data for Taymylyr
Month	Jan	Feb	Mar	Apr	May	Jun	Jul	Aug	Sep	Oct	Nov	Dec	Year
Record high °C (°F)	−13.9 (7.0)	−16.1 (3.0)	−3.9 (25.0)	−0.6 (30.9)	7.8 (46.0)	29.0 (84.2)	30.0 (86.0)	33.0 (91.4)	20.0 (68.0)	8.2 (46.8)	−3.9 (25.0)	−7.3 (18.9)	33.0 (91.4)
Mean daily maximum °C (°F)	−32.6 (−26.7)	−30.2 (−22.4)	−25.3 (−13.5)	−15.4 (4.3)	−5.5 (22.1)	6.9 (44.4)	14.4 (57.9)	10.1 (50.2)	2.8 (37.0)	−10.4 (13.3)	−23.1 (−9.6)	−28.5 (−19.3)	−12.3 (9.9)
Daily mean °C (°F)	−35.6 (−32.1)	−33.4 (−28.1)	−29.2 (−20.6)	−20.0 (−4.0)	−8.8 (16.2)	3.5 (38.3)	9.8 (49.6)	6.3 (43.3)	0.1 (32.2)	−13.6 (7.5)	−26.4 (−15.5)	−38 (−36)	−15.4 (4.2)
Mean daily minimum °C (°F)	−38.7 (−37.7)	−36.6 (−33.9)	−33.1 (−27.6)	−24.6 (−12.3)	−12.1 (10.2)	0.0 (32.0)	5.2 (41.4)	2.4 (36.3)	−2.7 (27.1)	−16.8 (1.8)	−29.6 (−21.3)	−34.8 (−30.6)	−19.4 (−2.9)
Record low °C (°F)	−50.6 (−59.1)	−51.0 (−59.8)	−47.8 (−54.0)	−41.4 (−42.5)	−28.9 (−20.0)	−11.1 (12.0)	−2.2 (28.0)	−5.0 (23.0)	−14.0 (6.8)	−35.0 (−31.0)	−47.8 (−54.0)	−50.6 (−59.1)	−51.0 (−59.8)
Average precipitation mm (inches)	5.4 (0.21)	19.8 (0.78)	13.7 (0.54)	9.5 (0.37)	29.6 (1.17)	18.5 (0.73)	30.2 (1.19)	23.6 (0.93)	43.5 (1.71)	41.5 (1.63)	19.4 (0.76)	12.0 (0.47)	266.7 (10.50)
