= Ust-Olenyok =

Ust-Olenyok Усть-Оленёк Уус Өлөөн (Sakha)
- Selo
- Interactive map of Ust-Olenyok
- Location of Ust-Olenyok Ust-Olenyok (Sakha Republic)
- Coordinates: 72°59′N 119°49′E
- Country: Russia
- Federal subject: Sakha Republic
- Administrative district: Bulunsky District
- Rural okrugSelsoviet: Ystannakhsky Rural Okrug

Population (2010 Census)
  - Total: 27
  - Estimate (2021): 11 (−59.3%)

Administrative status
  - Capital of: Ystannakhsky Rural Okrug

Municipal status
  - Municipal district: Bulunsky Municipal District
  - Rural settlement: Tyumetinsky Rural Settlement
- Time zone: UTC+
- Postal code: 678415
- OKTMO ID: 98612445111

Ust-Olenyok (Russian: Усть-Оленёк; Yakut: Уус Өлөөн / Ыстааннаах, romanized: Uus Ölöön / Istaannaax) is a rural locality (a selo), the only inhabited locality, and the administrative center of Ystannakhsky Rural Okrug of Bulunsky District in the Sakha Republic, Russia, located 365 kilometers (227 mi) from Tiksi, the administrative center of the district. Its population as of the 2010 Census was 27, down from 52 recorded during the 2002 Census.

== Geography ==
The settlement is located on the slope of a low hill, by the right bank of the mouth of the Olenyok River. The confluence of the Buolkalakh is located about 9 km (5.6 mi) upstream on the facing bank.

== History ==
The first settlement was a wintering hut built in 1633 near the modern village. It served as the administrative center of the desolate area and it was used by several Arctic expeditions.

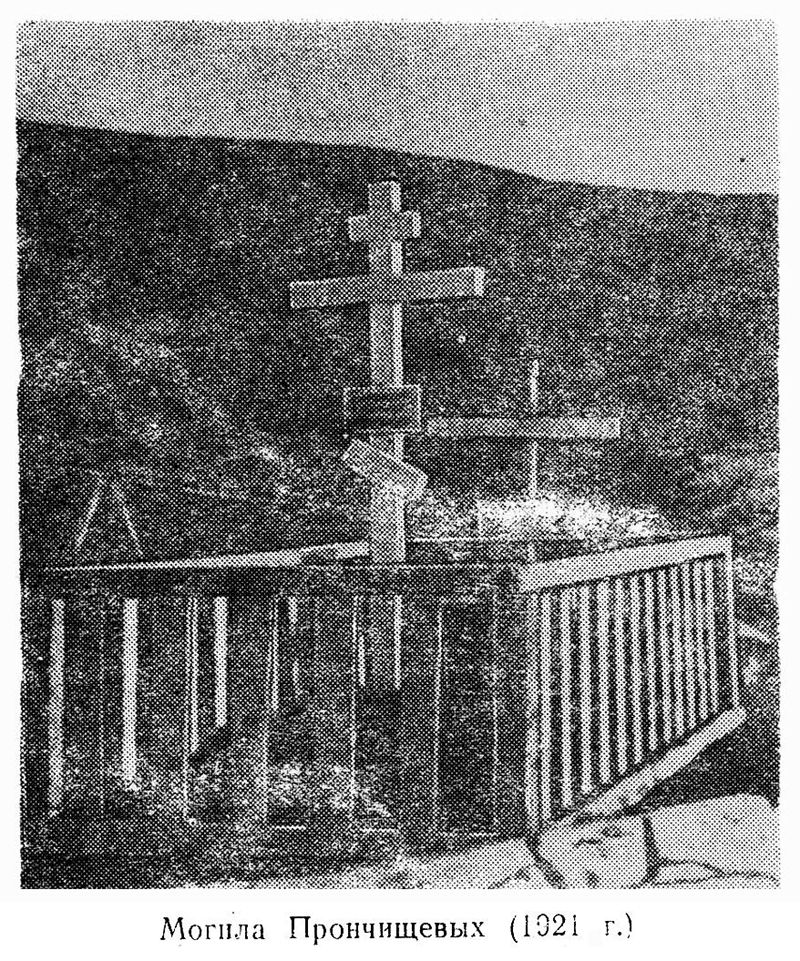
1921 picture of the grave of Vasili and Tatiana Pronchishchev in Ust-Olenyok. The tomb was moved after the bodies were exhumed in 1999.

== Climate ==
Ust-Olenyok has a tundra climate (ET) with short, cool summers and long, severely cold winters. On June 30, 2020, the temperature soared to 93.7 °F (34.3 °C) which may be the farthest north above 90 °F (32.2 °C) recorded above the 72 °N parallel. The following morning the temperature only dropped to 72.7 °F (22.6 °C).

Climate data for Ust-Olenyok
| Month | Jan | Feb | Mar | Apr | May | Jun | Jul | Aug | Sep | Oct | Nov | Dec | Year |
|---|---|---|---|---|---|---|---|---|---|---|---|---|---|
| Record high °C (°F) | −12.8 (9.0) | −10.4 (13.3) | 8.0 (46.4) | 15.0 (59.0) | 12.0 (53.6) | 34.3 (93.7) | 31.1 (88.0) | 26.2 (79.2) | 25.0 (77.0) | 14.5 (58.1) | 1.0 (33.8) | −6.3 (20.7) | 31.1 (88.0) |
| Mean daily maximum °C (°F) | −30.6 (−23.1) | −29.6 (−21.3) | −24.6 (−12.3) | −16.2 (2.8) | −5.4 (22.3) | 5.5 (41.9) | 12.3 (54.1) | 10.0 (50.0) | 2.7 (36.9) | −10.3 (13.5) | −23.3 (−9.9) | −28.0 (−18.4) | −12.6 (9.3) |
| Daily mean °C (°F) | −33.4 (−28.1) | −32.4 (−26.3) | −28.1 (−18.6) | −20.2 (−4.4) | −8.3 (17.1) | 2.5 (36.5) | 8.4 (47.1) | 6.7 (44.1) | 0.5 (32.9) | −13.0 (8.6) | −26.4 (−15.5) | −30.9 (−23.6) | −15.7 (3.7) |
| Mean daily minimum °C (°F) | −36.8 (−34.2) | −35.9 (−32.6) | −32.2 (−26.0) | −25.3 (−13.5) | −12.5 (9.5) | −0.9 (30.4) | 4.1 (39.4) | 3.4 (38.1) | −2.0 (28.4) | −16.3 (2.7) | −29.7 (−21.5) | −34.3 (−29.7) | −19.4 (−2.9) |
| Record low °C (°F) | −50.0 (−58.0) | −52.0 (−61.6) | −46.1 (−51.0) | −40.3 (−40.5) | −28.9 (−20.0) | −25.0 (−13.0) | −2.2 (28.0) | −6.1 (21.0) | −12.2 (10.0) | −40.0 (−40.0) | −46.2 (−51.2) | −49.1 (−56.4) | −52.0 (−61.6) |
| Average precipitation mm (inches) | 7.2 (0.28) | 7.7 (0.30) | 12.6 (0.50) | 14.2 (0.56) | 14.3 (0.56) | 26.3 (1.04) | 21.2 (0.83) | 36.5 (1.44) | 22.1 (0.87) | 34.1 (1.34) | 16.5 (0.65) | 10.7 (0.42) | 223.4 (8.80) |
