= Anabarsky District =

Anabarsky District Анабарский улус (Russian)
- District

Other transcription(s)
  - Yakut: Анаабыр улууhа
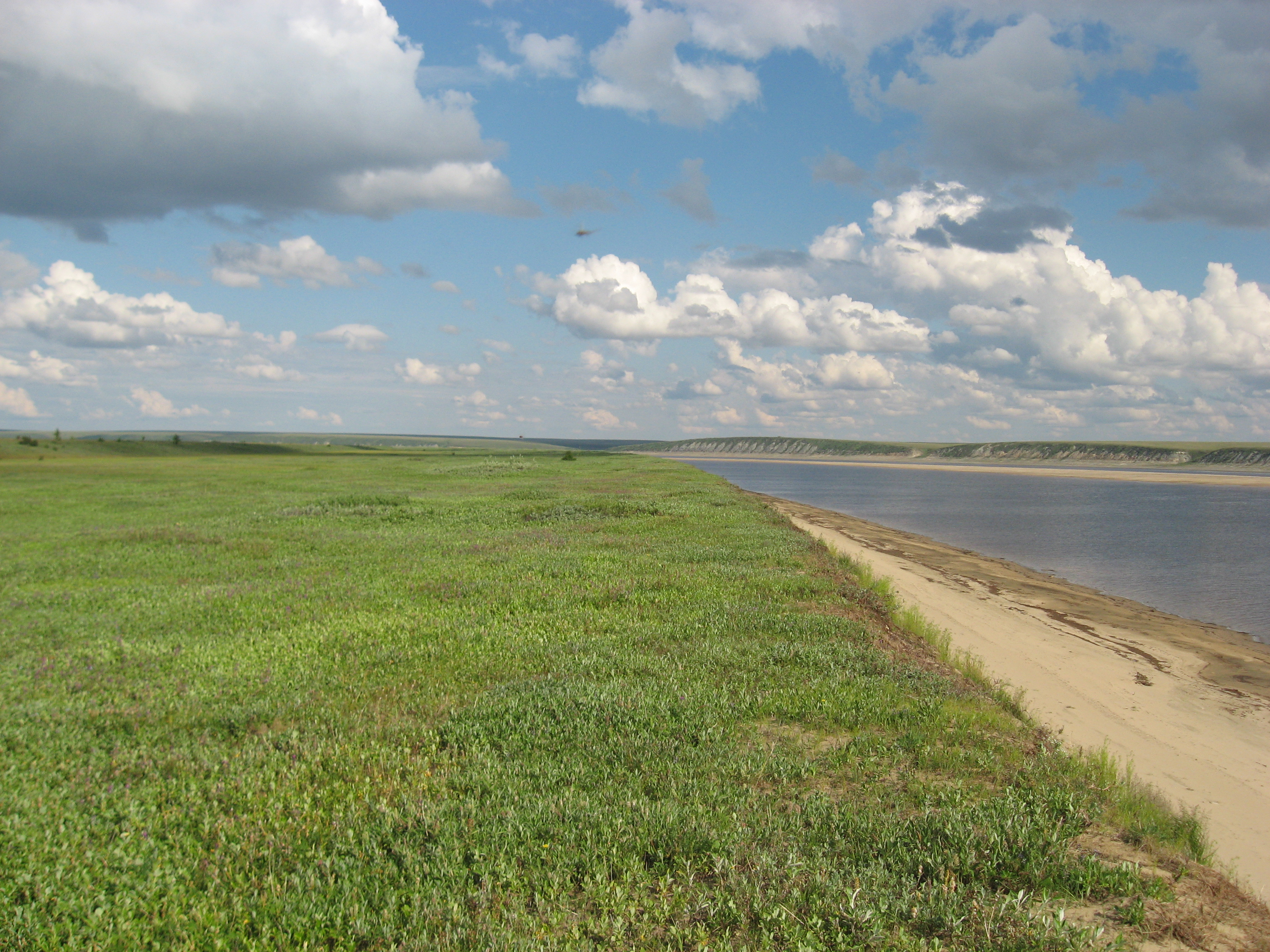
- Anabar River, Anabarsky District

- Flag Coat of arms
- Location of Anabarsky District in the Sakha Republic
- Coordinates: 72°07′N 114°21′E
- Country: Russia
- Federal subject: Sakha Republic
- Established: December 30, 1930
- Administrative center: Saskylakh

Area
  - Total: 55,600 km^{2} (21,500 sq mi)

Population (2010 Census)
  - Total: 3,501
  - Estimate (January 2016): 3,431
  - Density: 0.0630/km^{2} (0.163/sq mi)
  - Urban: 0%
  - Rural: 100%

Administrative structure
  - Administrative divisions: 3 Rural okrugs
  - Inhabited localities: 3 rural localities

Municipal structure
  - Municipally incorporated as: Anabarsky Municipal District
  - Municipal divisions: 0 urban settlements, 2 rural settlements
- Time zone: UTC+
- OKTMO ID: 98610000

Anabarsky District (Russian: Анаба́рский улу́с; Yakut: Анаабыр улууһа, Anaabır uluuha, [anaːbɯɾ uluːha]) is an administrative and municipal district (raion, or ulus), one of the thirty-four in the Sakha Republic, Russia. It is located in the northwest of the republic and borders with Bulunsky District in the east, Olenyoksky District in the south, and with Taymyrsky Dolgano-Nenetsky District of Krasnoyarsk Krai in the west. The area of the district is 55,600 square kilometers (21,500 sq mi). Its administrative center is the rural locality (a selo) of Saskylakh. As of the 2010 Census, the total population of the district was 3,501, with the population of Saskylakh accounting for 66.2% of that number.

Historical population
Year	Pop.	±%
1970	1,906	—
1979	2,161	+13.4%
1989	3,903	+80.6%
2002	4,024	+3.1%
2010	3,501	−13.0%
2021	3,479	−0.6%
Source: Census data

== Geography ==
The district is washed by the Laptev Sea in the north. The landscape of the district is mostly flat. The main rivers are the Anabar, with its tributaries the Suolama and Udya, as well as the Uele. The Anabar and Uele have their mouth in Anabar Bay. There are numerous lakes, the largest one is Lake Sappyya.

=== Climate ===
Average January temperature ranges from −34 to −36 °C (−29 to −33 °F) and average July temperature ranges from +4 to +10 °C (39 to 50 °F). Average annual precipitation is 150–200 millimeters (5.9–7.9 in).

== History ==
The district was established on December 30, 1930.

== Administrative and municipal status ==
Within the framework of administrative divisions, Anabarsky District is one of the thirty-four in the republic. The district is divided into three rural okrugs (naslegs) which comprise three rural localities. As a municipal division, the district is incorporated as Anabarsky Municipal District. Its three rural okrugs are incorporated into two rural settlements within the municipal district. The selo of Saskylakh serves as the administrative center of both the administrative and municipal district.

=== Inhabited localities ===
Administrative/municipal composition
Rural okrugs/Rural settlements	Population	Rural localities in jurisdiction*
Saskylakhsky Rural Okrug/Rural Settlement (Саскылахский)	2,317	**selo of Saskylakh** (administrative center of the district)
Ebelyakhsky Rural Okrug (Эбеляхский)	36	**selo of Ebelyakh** (municipally, a part of Saskylakhsky Rural Settlement)
Yuryung-Khainsky Rural Okrug/Rural Settlement (Юрюнг-Хаинский)	1,148	**selo of Yuryung-Khaya**

*Administrative centers are shown in bold

== Economy ==
The economy of the district is mostly based on mining, reindeer husbandry, fishing, and hunting. There are deposits of diamonds in the district.

== Demographics ==
As of the 2021 Census, the ethnic composition was as follows:

- Dolgans: 44.4%
- Evenks: 30.9%
- Yakuts: 19.3%
- Russians: 2.5%
- Evens: 0.6%
- Yukaghirs: 0.5%
- Ukrainians: 0.5%
- others: 1.3%

The village of Yuryung-Khaya is the only settlement in the Sakha Republic where Dolgans form a majority of the population.
