= Saskylakh =

Saskylakh Саскылах
- Selo

Other transcription(s)
  - Sakha: Сааскылаах
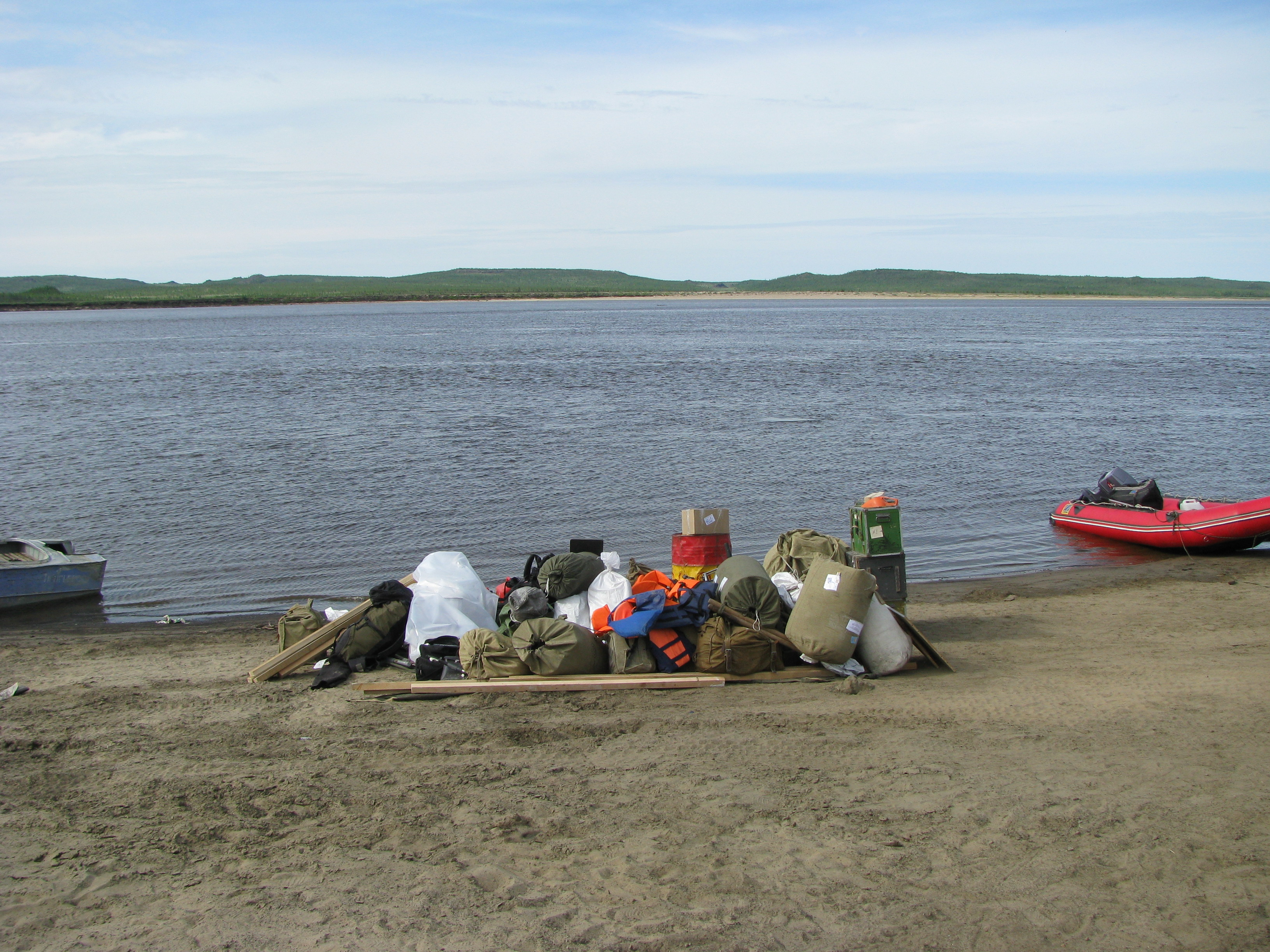
- Pier near the village of Saskylakh
- Interactive map of Saskylakh
- Location of Saskylakh Saskylakh (Sakha Republic)
- Coordinates: 71°57′55″N 114°05′32″E
- Country: Russia
- Federal subject: Sakha Republic
- Administrative district: Anabarsky District
- Rural okrugSelsoviet: Saskylakhsky Rural Okrug
- Founded: 1930
- Elevation: 24 m (79 ft)

Population (2010 Census)
  - Total: 2,317
  - Estimate (2021): 2,345 (+1.2%)

Administrative status
  - Capital of: Saskylakhsky Rural Okrug

Municipal status
  - Municipal district: Anabarsky Municipal District
  - Rural settlement: Saskylakhsky Rural Settlement
  - Capital of: Saskylakhsky Rural Settlement
- Time zone: UTC+
- Postal code: 678440
- OKTMO ID: 98610411101

Saskylakh (Russian: Саскылах; Yakut: Сааскылаах, Saaskılaax) is a rural locality (a selo) and the administrative center of Anabarsky District in the Sakha Republic, Russia. Its population as of the 2010 Census was 2,317, up from 1,985 recorded during the 2002 Census and further up from 1,856 recorded during the 1989 Census.

== Geography ==
Saskylakh is located on the right bank of the Anabar River, downstream from the confluence with the Udya. It is one of the main ports in the river.

=== Climate ===
Despite lying well inside the Arctic Circle, Saskylakh has a subarctic climate (Köppen climate classification Dfc) with very short, mild summers and severely cold winters. Precipitation is moderate; it falls mostly as rain in summer and mainly as snow throughout the rest of the year. Summers get above 10 °C (50 °F) due to warm spells of southerly winds, which has rendered an all-time record of 35.6 °C (96.1 °F) whereas the Arctic Ocean to its north remains extremely chilly even when ice-free in summer. As a result, summers are highly variable. In winter, temperatures are more stable, with cold extremes not deviating much from the average lows. Brief spells of maritime air can bring temperatures a lot less cold, but there are still eight reliable months below freezing. There is also a strong seasonal lag due to the late thawing of the ice pack to the north. As a result, May is still a winter month even with midnight sun.

Climate data for Saskylakh
Month	Jan	Feb	Mar	Apr	May	Jun	Jul	Aug	Sep	Oct	Nov	Dec	Year
Record high °C (°F)	−2.2 (28.0)	−2.4 (27.7)	2.3 (36.1)	9.8 (49.6)	23.8 (74.8)	32.7 (90.9)	35.6 (96.1)	31.3 (88.3)	24.6 (76.3)	9.6 (49.3)	1.5 (34.7)	−2.3 (27.9)	35.6 (96.1)
Mean maximum °C (°F)	−15.2 (4.6)	−16.8 (1.8)	−6.7 (19.9)	0.3 (32.5)	8.7 (47.7)	26.0 (78.8)	27.1 (80.8)	23.5 (74.3)	14.0 (57.2)	1.8 (35.2)	−8.4 (16.9)	−13.0 (8.6)	28.7 (83.7)
Mean daily maximum °C (°F)	−30.1 (−22.2)	−30.3 (−22.5)	−22.2 (−8.0)	−11.7 (10.9)	−2.3 (27.9)	11.5 (52.7)	16.8 (62.2)	13.5 (56.3)	4.7 (40.5)	−8.8 (16.2)	−22.5 (−8.5)	−28.5 (−19.3)	−9.2 (15.5)
Daily mean °C (°F)	−33.8 (−28.8)	−34.1 (−29.4)	−27.0 (−16.6)	−17.1 (1.2)	−5.9 (21.4)	7.0 (44.6)	11.8 (53.2)	9.0 (48.2)	1.6 (34.9)	−12.0 (10.4)	−26.3 (−15.3)	−32.1 (−25.8)	−13.2 (8.2)
Mean daily minimum °C (°F)	−37.5 (−35.5)	−37.7 (−35.9)	−31.4 (−24.5)	−22.2 (−8.0)	−9.4 (15.1)	3.3 (37.9)	7.5 (45.5)	5.1 (41.2)	−1.0 (30.2)	−15.4 (4.3)	−30.0 (−22.0)	−35.7 (−32.3)	−17.0 (1.3)
Mean minimum °C (°F)	−48.2 (−54.8)	−49.2 (−56.6)	−44.9 (−48.8)	−34.5 (−30.1)	−20.4 (−4.7)	−3.6 (25.5)	1.5 (34.7)	−0.9 (30.4)	−7.9 (17.8)	−28.4 (−19.1)	−40.5 (−40.9)	−46.6 (−51.9)	−52.1 (−61.8)
Record low °C (°F)	−58.8 (−73.8)	−60.3 (−76.5)	−54.7 (−66.5)	−46.8 (−52.2)	−32.0 (−25.6)	−12.6 (9.3)	−2.1 (28.2)	−5.6 (21.9)	−18.1 (−0.6)	−42.0 (−43.6)	−50.8 (−59.4)	−59.9 (−75.8)	−60.3 (−76.5)
Average precipitation mm (inches)	9.1 (0.36)	8.3 (0.33)	9.4 (0.37)	10.2 (0.40)	15.4 (0.61)	13.6 (0.54)	21.4 (0.84)	26.7 (1.05)	20.7 (0.81)	21.1 (0.83)	13.2 (0.52)	8.4 (0.33)	177.5 (6.99)
Average precipitation days	16.6	14.7	14.7	14.6	14.7	14.0	14.0	15.4	16.4	21.4	18.0	16.0	193.5
Average relative humidity (%)	74.4	73.3	74.2	74.8	78.1	71.3	71.9	79.2	83.8	83.7	78.4	75.1	76.5
Mean monthly sunshine hours	0.0	11.2	133.3	246.0	204.6	249.0	251.1	145.7	51.0	12.4	0.0	0.0	1,304.3
Source 1: Roshydromet
Source 2: climatebase.ru (1957-2011)

== Demographics ==
Historical population
Year	Pop.	±%
1939	435	—
1959	445	+2.3%
1970	863	+93.9%
1979	1,534	+77.8%
1989	1,856	+21.0%
2002	1,985	+7.0%
2010	2,317	+16.7%
Source: Census data

== Transportation ==
There are no year-round roads leading to Saskylakh, although there is a winter road which leads to Olenyok and then further 600 kilometers (370 mi) south to Udachny. In the opposite direction, the road also continues downstream along the Anabar to Yuryung-Khaya.

Saskylakh Airport is a few kilometers south.
