= Kyusyur =

Kyusyur Кюсюр
- Selo

Other transcription(s)
  - Yakut: Күһүүр
- Interactive map of Kyusyur
- Location of Kyusyur Kyusyur (Sakha Republic)
- Coordinates: 70°41′N 127°22′E
- Country: Russia
- Federal subject: Sakha Republic
- Administrative district: Bulunsky District
- Rural okrugSelsoviet: Bulunsky Rural Okrug
- Founded: 1924

Population (2010 Census)
  - Total: 1,345
  - Estimate (2021): 1,072 (−20.3%)

Administrative status
  - Capital of: Bulunsky Rural Okrug

Municipal status
  - Municipal district: Bulunsky Municipal District
  - Rural settlement: Bulunsky Rural Settlement
  - Capital of: Bulunsky Rural Settlement
- Time zone: UTC+
- Postal code: 678420
- OKTMO ID: 98612412101

Kyusyur (Russian: Кюсюр; Yakut: Күһүүр, romanized: Kühüür) is a rural locality (a selo), the only inhabited locality, and the administrative center of Bulunsky Rural Okrug of the Bulunsky District in the Sakha Republic, Russia, located 120 kilometers (75 mi) from Tiksi, the administrative center of the district. Its population as of the 2010 Census was 1,345; up from 1,336 recorded in the 2002 Census. One of the world islands in Dubai is named after Kyusyur.

== Geography ==
Kyusyur is located by the right bank of the Lena, a few kilometres south of the mouth of the Eyekit.

== Climate ==
Kyusyur has an extremely continental subarctic climate (Dfc, bordering on Dfd) with extremely cold, long winters and very mild, very short summers.

Climate data for Kyusyur
Month	Jan	Feb	Mar	Apr	May	Jun	Jul	Aug	Sep	Oct	Nov	Dec	Year
Record high °C (°F)	−6.8 (19.8)	−8.9 (16.0)	2.1 (35.8)	10.5 (50.9)	22.1 (71.8)	32.8 (91.0)	34.0 (93.2)	31.0 (87.8)	22.0 (71.6)	7.8 (46.0)	−1.0 (30.2)	−6.3 (20.7)	34.0 (93.2)
Mean daily maximum °C (°F)	−34.1 (−29.4)	−31.3 (−24.3)	−21.5 (−6.7)	−10.0 (14.0)	1.0 (33.8)	12.9 (55.2)	17.7 (63.9)	14.0 (57.2)	5.6 (42.1)	−8.4 (16.9)	−25.1 (−13.2)	−31.4 (−24.5)	−9.2 (15.4)
Daily mean °C (°F)	−37.8 (−36.0)	−35.0 (−31.0)	−26.4 (−15.5)	−15.5 (4.1)	−3.1 (26.4)	8.1 (46.6)	12.7 (54.9)	9.6 (49.3)	2.1 (35.8)	−11.5 (11.3)	−29.1 (−20.4)	−35.3 (−31.5)	−13.4 (7.9)
Mean daily minimum °C (°F)	−41.9 (−43.4)	−39.1 (−38.4)	−31.5 (−24.7)	−21.1 (−6.0)	−7.2 (19.0)	4.1 (39.4)	8.0 (46.4)	5.4 (41.7)	−1.1 (30.0)	−15.0 (5.0)	−33.3 (−27.9)	−39.5 (−39.1)	−17.6 (0.3)
Record low °C (°F)	−59.7 (−75.5)	−60.4 (−76.7)	−51.1 (−60.0)	−46.2 (−51.2)	−31.1 (−24.0)	−13.0 (8.6)	−5.0 (23.0)	−6.0 (21.2)	−18.2 (−0.8)	−39.3 (−38.7)	−51.7 (−61.1)	−60.4 (−76.7)	−60.4 (−76.7)
Average precipitation mm (inches)	11.7 (0.46)	11.7 (0.46)	15.1 (0.59)	18.3 (0.72)	39.5 (1.56)	35.3 (1.39)	52.9 (2.08)	42.2 (1.66)	42.7 (1.68)	29.1 (1.15)	16.2 (0.64)	22.0 (0.87)	336.7 (13.26)
Average precipitation days	20.1	12.9	14.9	10.1	11.8	13.9	12.9	14.0	17.3	22.7	18.4	18.3	187.3
