= Bulunsky District =

Bulunsky District Булунский улус (Russian)
- District

Other transcription(s)
  - Yakut: Булуҥ улууhа
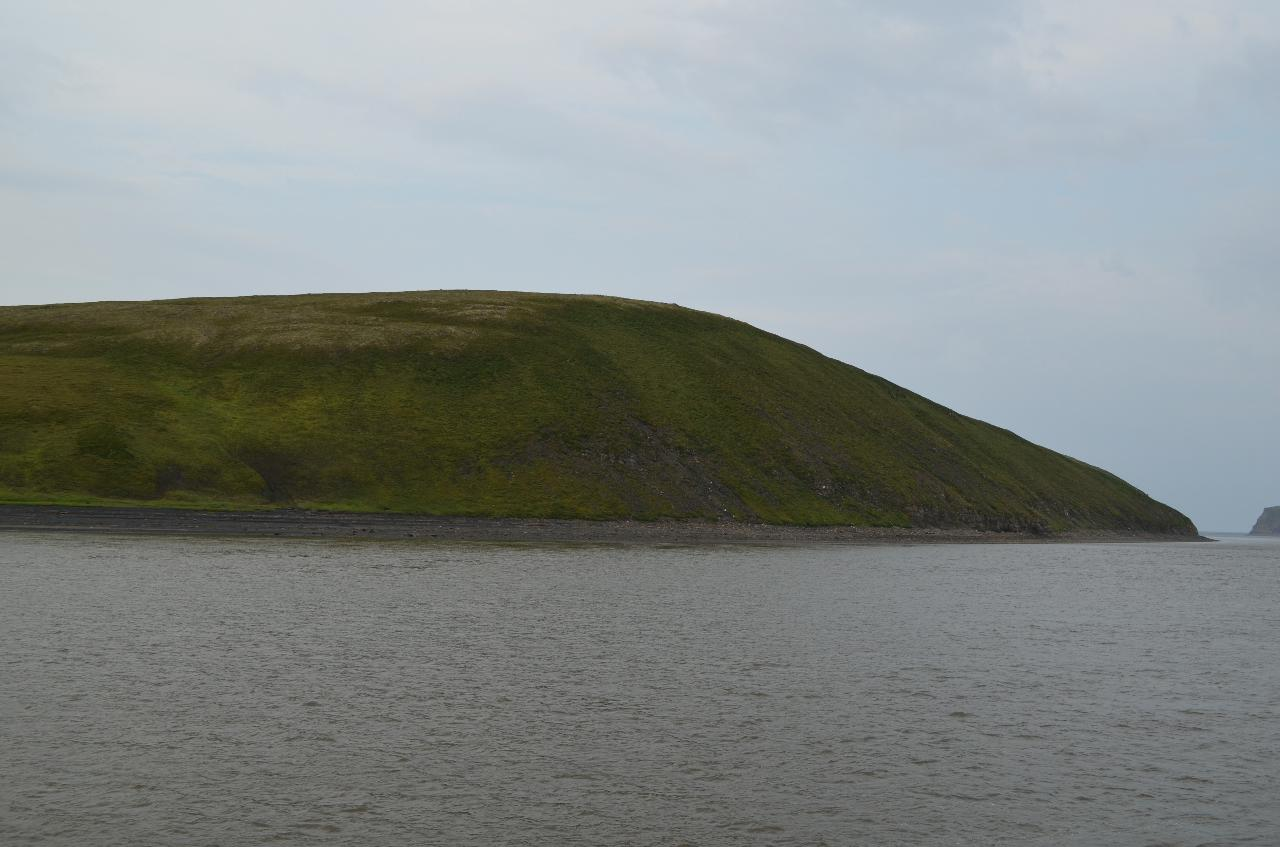
- Cape Krest-Tumsa in the Lena River delta, a protected area of Russia in Bulunsky District

- Flag Coat of arms
- Location of Bulunsky District in the Sakha Republic
- Coordinates: 70°41′N 127°21′E
- Country: Russia
- Federal subject: Sakha Republic
- Established: December 10, 1930
- Administrative center: Tiksi

Area
  - Total: 223,600 km^{2} (86,300 sq mi)

Population (2010 Census)
  - Total: 9,054
  - Density: 0.04049/km^{2} (0.1049/sq mi)
  - Urban: 55.9%
  - Rural: 44.1%

Administrative structure
  - Administrative divisions: 1 Settlements, 8 Rural okrugs
  - Inhabited localities: 1 urban-type settlements, 9 rural localities

Municipal structure
  - Municipally incorporated as: Bulunsky Municipal District
  - Municipal divisions: 1 urban settlements, 6 rural settlements
- Time zone: UTC+
- OKTMO ID: 98612000

Population of Bulunsky District
- 2010 Census: 9,054
- 2002 Census: 9,775
- 1989 Census: 17,257
- 1979 Census: 14,671

Bulunsky District (Russian: Булу́нский улу́с; Yakut: Булуҥ улууһа, Buluŋ uluuha) is an administrative and municipal district (raion, or ulus), one of the thirty-four in the Sakha Republic, Russia. It is the most northerly district of the republic, and includes the offshore New Siberian Islands. Bulunsky borders Ust-Yansky District in the east, Verkhoyansky District in the southeast, Eveno-Bytantaysky and Zhigansky Districts in the south, Olenyoksky District in the west, and Anabarsky District in the northwest. The area of the district is 223,600 square kilometers (86,300 sq mi). Its administrative center is the urban-type settlement of Tiksi. As of the 2010 Census, the total population of the district was 9,054, with the population of Tiksi accounting for 55.9% of that number.

== Geography ==
The district is washed by the Laptev Sea in the north. The main river in the district is the Lena, with its tributaries Eyekit, Molodo and Syungyude. Other rivers include the Olenyok, with the Khorbusuonka and the Kyuyutingde, as well as the Omoloy and the Khara-Ulakh. There are many lakes in the Lena River delta. The Lena Delta Wildlife Reserve is located in the district.

=== Climate ===
Average January temperature varies from −32 °C (−26 °F) on the coast to −40 °C (−40 °F) in the interior and average July temperature varies from +4 °C (39 °F) in the north to +14 °C (57 °F) in the south. Average precipitation ranges from 150 to 200 millimeters (5.9 to 7.9 in) in the north and from 250 to 300 millimeters (9.8 to 11.8 in) in the south.

== History ==
The district was established on December 10, 1930. Initially, its administrative center was in the selo of Kyusyur. In 1957, the administrative center was moved to Tiksi.

== Administrative and municipal status ==
Within the framework of administrative divisions, Bulunsky District is one of the thirty-four in the republic. It is divided into one settlement (an administrative division with the administrative center in the urban-type settlement (inhabited locality) of Tiksi) and eight rural okrugs (naslegs), all of which comprise nine rural localities. As a municipal division, the district is incorporated as Bulunsky Municipal District. The Settlement of Tiksi is incorporated into an urban settlement, and the eight rural okrugs are incorporated into six rural settlements within the municipal district. The urban-type settlement of Tiksi serves as the administrative center of both the administrative and municipal district.

=== Inhabited localities ===
Administrative/municipal composition
Settlements/Urban settlements	Population	Inhabited localities in jurisdiction
Tiksi (Тикси)	2,756	urban-type settlement of Tiksi (administrative center of the district)
Rural okrugs/Rural settlements	Population	Rural localities in jurisdiction*
Borogonsky Rural Okrug/Rural Settlement (Борогонский)	526	**selo of Namy**
Bulunsky Rural Okrug/Rural Settlement (Булунский)	1,345	**selo of Kyusyur**; selo of Chekurovka
Bykovsky Rural Okrug/Rural Settlement (Быковский)	517	**selo of Bykovsky**
Siktyakhsky Rural Okrug/Rural Settlement (Сиктяхский)	287	**selo of Siktyakh**
Tumatsky Rural Okrug (Туматский)	10	**selo of Sklad** (municipally, a part of Tyumetinsky Rural Settlement)
Tyumyetinsky Rural Okrug/Rural Settlement (Тюметинский)	757	**selo of Taymylyr**
Khara-Ulakhsky Rural Okrug/Rural Settlement (Хара-Улахский)	522	**selo of Nayba**
Ystannakhsky Rural Okrug (Ыстаннахский)	27	**selo of Ust-Olenyok** (municipally, a part of Tyumetinsky Rural Settlement)

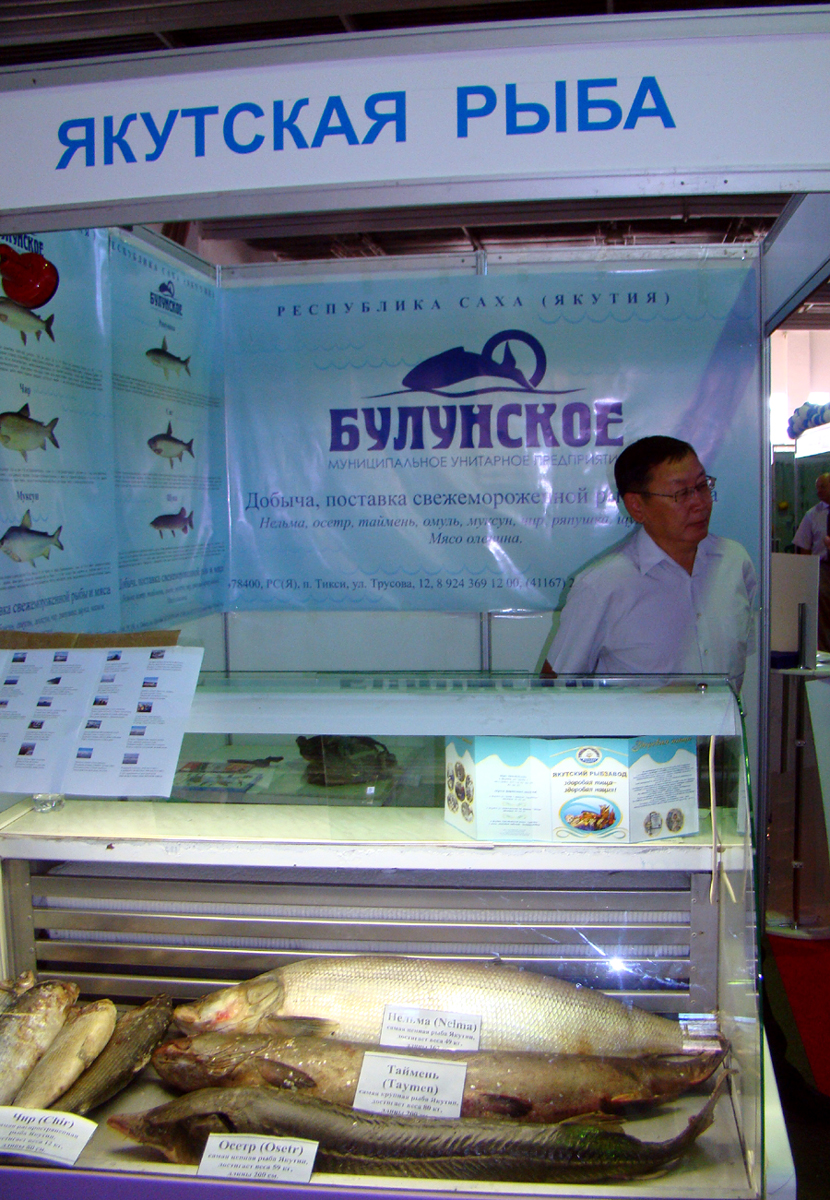
Bulunsky District's stand at the fish industry fair in Vladivostok

Historical population
Year	Pop.	±%
1959	10,176	—
1970	12,620	+24.0%
1979	14,671	+16.3%
1989	17,257	+17.6%
2002	9,775	−43.4%
2010	9,054	−7.4%
2021	7,706	−14.9%
Source: Census data

*Administrative centers are shown in bold

== Economy ==
The economy of the district is mostly based on reindeer husbandry and fishing. Tiksi is a sea port on the Northern Sea Route.

== Demographics ==
As of the 2021 Census, the ethnic composition was as follows:

- Russians: 28.8%
- Evenks: 27.4%
- Yakuts: 24.6%
- Evens: 13.4%
- Ukrainians: 1.2%
- Kyrgyz: 0.6%
- others: 4.0%
