= Eyekit =

River in Yakutia (Sakha Republic), Russia

Eyekit Эекит / Эйэкит
- Lena basin with the Eyekit in the upper part

- Mouth location in Yakutia, Russia

Location
- Country: Russia

Physical characteristics
- Source
  - location: Kystyk Plateau
  - coordinates: 70°29′42″N 123°58′55″E
  - elevation: ca 300 m (980 ft)
- Mouth: Lena
  - location: Near Kyusyur
  - coordinates: 70°52′26″N 127°26′40″E
  - elevation: 5 m (16 ft)
- Length: 313 km (194 mi)
- Basin size: 8,740 square kilometres (3,370 mi^{2})

Basin features
- Progression: Lena→ Laptev Sea

The Eyekit (Russian: Эекит, Yakut: Эйэкит) is a river in the Sakha Republic (Yakutia), Russia. It is a left tributary of the Lena. Its length is 313 kilometres (194 mi) from the sources of the Buor Eyekit. The area of its basin including the latter is 8,740 square kilometres (3,370 sq mi).

The Eyekit flows across the Bulunsky district. The banks of the river are uninhabited.

== Geography ==
The Eyekit is the last major tributary of the Lena before it ends in the Arctic Ocean. It originates in the southeastern slopes of the Kystyk Plateau, at the northeastern limit of the Central Siberian Plateau as the Buor-Eyekit. In its upper course it flows southeast, then it reaches a floodplain with small lakes and swamps and turns northeast. After being joined by the Tas-Eyekit from the left, it flows roughly eastwards cutting across the southern end of the Chekanovsky Ridge, north of a large bend of the Lena. Finally it meets the left bank of the great river a little north of Kyusyur, 183 kilometres (114 mi) upstream of its mouth in the Laptev Sea.

The Eyekit freezes in the first half of October and stays under ice until late May.

=== Tributaries ===
The longest tributary of the Eyekit is the 155 km (96 mi) long Tas-Eyekit (Тас-Эекит), joining it from the left.

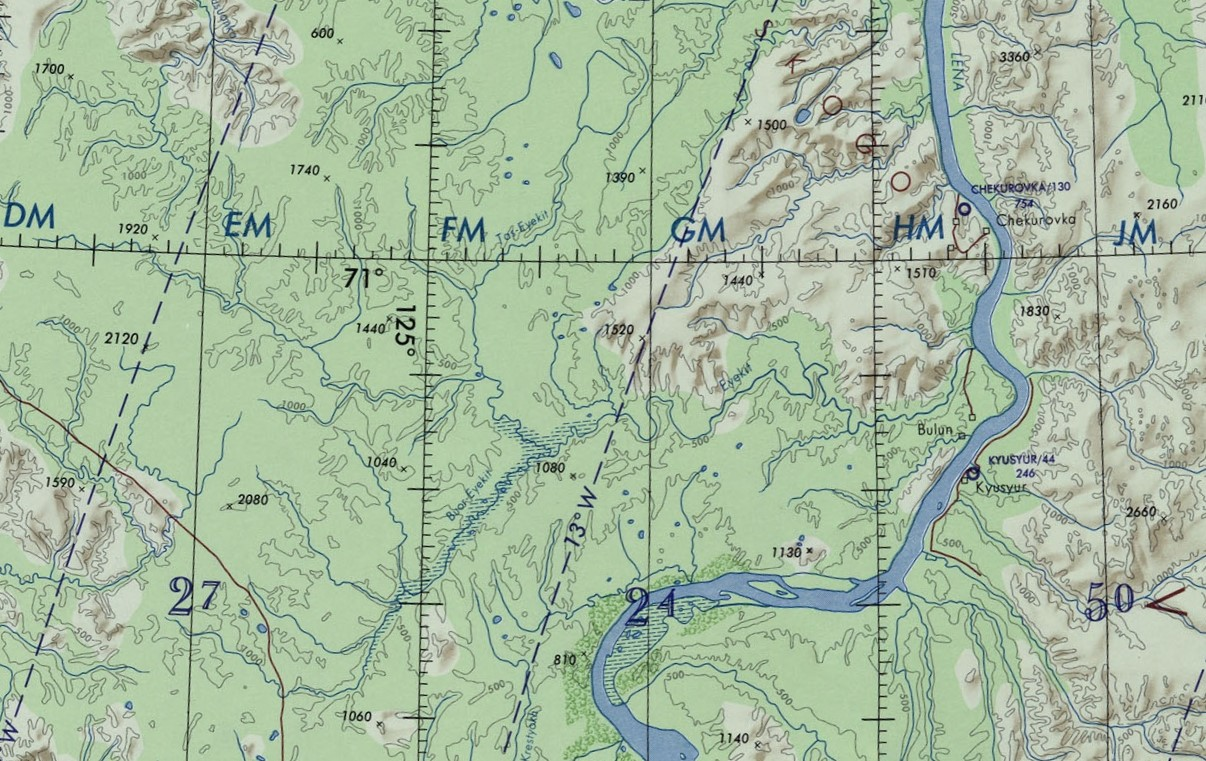
Course of the Eyekit map section.

== See also ==
- List of rivers of Russia
