= Golden Eagle Award for Best Animation =

Russian film award

Golden Eagle Award for Best Animated Feature Film
- Awarded for: Best Animated Featured Film of the Year
- Country: Russia
- Presented by: National Academy of Motion Pictures Arts and Sciences of Russia
- First award: 2002
- Currently held by: Oksana Kholodova for Neobyknovennaya istoriya odnogo l'va (The Extraordinary Story of One Lion, 2024)
- Website: Official site of the National Academy of Motion Picture Arts and Sciences of Russia

The Golden Eagle Award for Best Animated Feature Film (Russian: Золотой Орёл для лучший анимационный фильму) is one of twenty award categories presented annually by the National Academy of Motion Pictures Arts and Sciences of Russia. It is one of the Golden Eagle Awards, which were conceived by Nikita Mikhalkov as a counterweight to the Nika Award established in 1987 by the Russian Academy of Cinema Arts and Sciences.

Each year the members of the academy choose three (except in the year 2002) nominees to award the best animated film and the film as a perception. The first animator to be awarded was Alexey Demin for the film Cats Under Rain (Кошки под дождем). The most recent award was made to Oksana Holodova's One lion's Unusual story (Neobyknovennaya istoriya odnogo l'va , 2024). The most successful animation director is Alexey Demin, Alexander Tatarsky, and Konstantin Bronzit with two wins each. Inna Evlannikova (who won one award), Anatoly Prokhorov, and Maria Muat (both have not won) were nominated thrice. Other people with multiple nominations include Elena Pitkevich (with two nominations but no wins) and Svetlana Andrianova (winning one from two nominations).

== Nomineess and awardees ==
Key

Sign	Meaning
†	The international title is not known
**Bold**	Indicates the winner

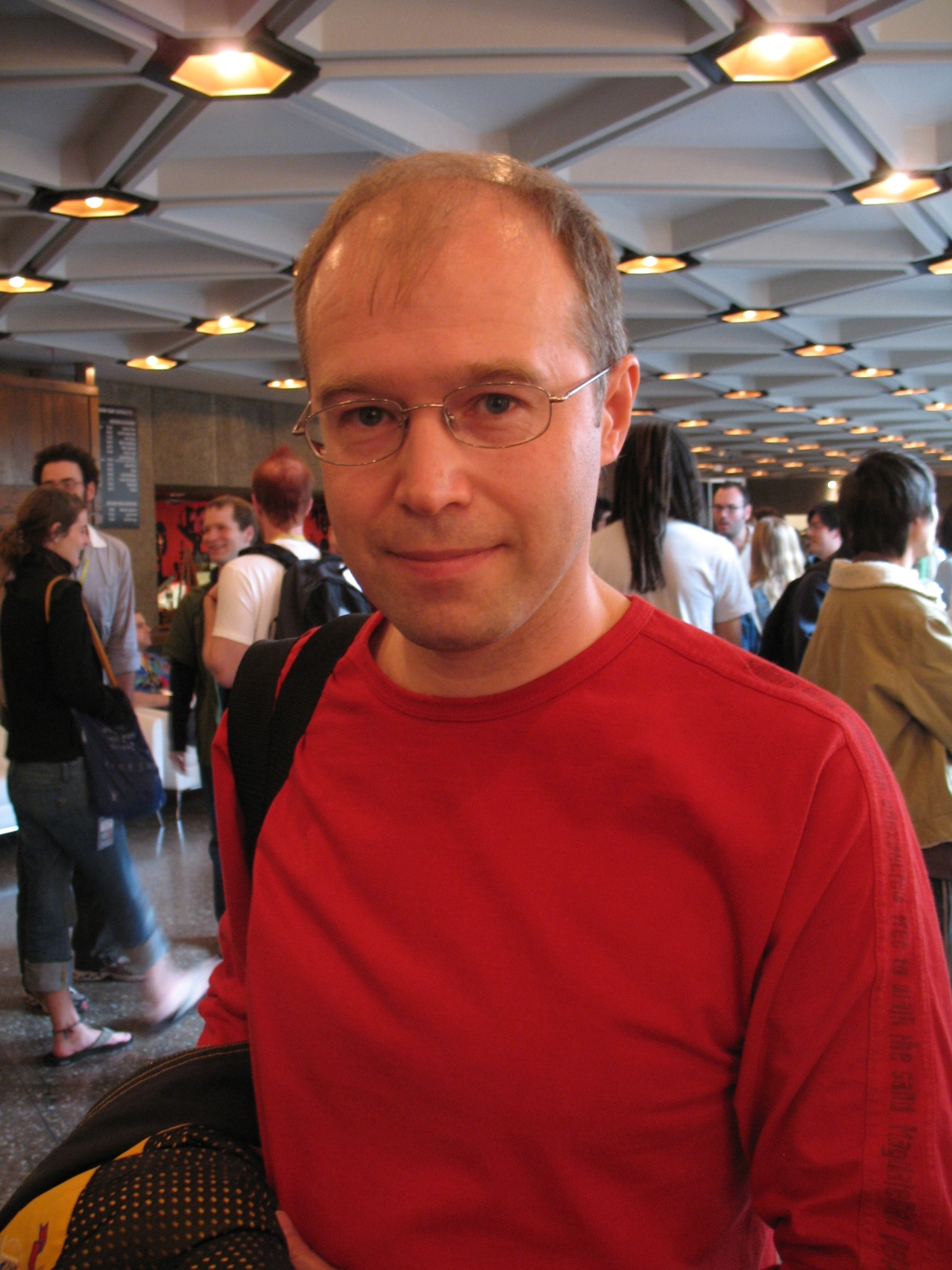
Konstantin Bronzit animations were nominated in 2007, 2009, and 2019, the last time he received the award

=== 2000s ===
Year	Director	International title	National title	Transliterated title (per BGN/PCGN standard)	Ref(s)
2002	**Alexey Demin**	Cats Under Rain	Кошки под дождем	Koshka pod dozhdem	
2002	Dmitry Geller	Greetings from Kislovodsk	Привет из Кисловодска	Privet iz Kislovodtska	
2003	**Andrei Khrzhanovsky**	One and a Half of the Cat	Полтора кота	Poltora kota	
2003	Mikhail Aldashin	Bukashkis	Букашки	Bukashki	
2003	Alexander Tatarsky, Valentin Telegin	The Red Gate Rasemon	Красные ворота Расёмон	Krasniye vorota Rasyomon	
2004	**Tatyana Ilina**	The Nutcracker	Щелкунчик	Shchelkunchik	
2004	Oleg KuznetsovIrina Rakitina	How The Little Tiger Looked For The Stripes	Как тигренок искал полоски	Kak tigrenok iskal poloski	
2004	Maria Muat	About a Little Mouse	Про мышонка	Pro myshonka	
2005	**Alexander Tatarsky**	Mountain of Gems (film series)	Гора самоцветов	Gora samotsvetov	
2005	Natalya Orlova	Kashtanka	Каштанка	Kashtanka	
2005	Andrey Uskakov	Wings	Крылья	Kryl'ya	
2006	**Ekaterina Mikhalkova**	The Captain's Daughter	Капитанская дочка	Kapitanskaya dochka	
2006	Anatoly Prokhorov	GoGoRiki (film series)	Смешарики	Smeshariki	
2006	Alexandr Bubnov	Sherlock Holmes and Doctor Watson	Шерлок Холмс и Доктор Ватсон	Sherlok Kholms i Doktor Watson	
2007	**Alexander Tatarsky**	Mountain of Gems (film series)	Гора самоцветов	Gora samotsvetov	
2007	Anatoly Prokhorov	GoGoRiki (film series)	Смешарики	Smeshariki	
2007	Konstantin Bronzit	Lavatory Lovestory	Уборная истроия – лиобовная история	Ubornaya istoriya – liubovnaya istoriya	
2008	**Elisaveta Skrovtsova**	Lullabies of the World (film series)	Колыбельные мира	Kolybel'nye mira	
2008	Ivan Maksimov	Rain Down From Above	Дождь сверху вниз	Dozhd' sverkhu vniz	
2008	Georgi Gitis	(unknown)†	Приключения Алёнушки и Ерёмы	Priklyucheniya Alyonushki i Eryomy	
2009	**Konstantin Bronzit**	The True Story of the 3 Little Pigs! †	Правдивая история о трех поросятах	Pravdivaya istoriya o trekh prosyatakh	
2009	Anatoly Prokhorov	GoGoRiki (film series)	Смешарики	Smeshariki	
2009	Irina Margolina, Elena Pitkevich	(unknown)†	Роберт Шуман (письма)	Robert Shuman (pis'ma)	

=== 2010s ===
Year	Director	International title	National title	Transliterated title (per BGN/PCGN standard)	Ref(s)
2010	**Svyatoslav Ushakov**, **Inna Evlannikova**	Space Dogs	Белка и Стрелка. Звёздные собаки	Belka i strelka. Zvyozdniye Sobaki	
2010	Maria Muat	(unknown)†	Непечальная история	Nepechal'naya istoriya	
2010	Natalya Malgina, Sergey Seregin, Pavel Sukhikh, Oksana Kholodova	(unknown)†	Рассказы А.П. Чехова	Rasskazy A.P. Chekhova	
2011	**Sergey Glezin**	(unknown)†	Три богатыря и Шамаханская царица	Tri bogatyrya i Shamakhanskaya tsaritsa	
2011	Maria Muat	(unknown)†	Метель	Metel	
2011	Yulia Titova	(unknown)†	Сергей Прокофьев	Sergei Prokofyev	
2012	**Elena Pitkevich**	(unknown)†	Бах	Bakh	
2012	Aleksey Turkus	(unknown)†	Заснеженный всадник	Zasnezhennyi vsadnik	
2012	Ivan Maksimov	Out of Play	Вне игры	Vne igry	
2013	**Alexey Demin**	Hush, Grandma is Sleeping!	Тише, бабушка спит	Tishe, babushka spit	
2013	Mikhail Aldashin	Immortal	Бессмертный	Bessmertnyy	
2013	Ivan Maximov	Long Bridge of Desired Direction	Длинный мост в нужную сторону	Dlinnyy most v nuzhnuyu storonu	
2014	**Vladimir Toropchin**	Ivan Tsarevich and the Gray Wolf 2	Иван Царевич и Серый Волк 2	Ivan Tsarevich i Seryy Volk 2	
2014	Aleksandr Khramtsov, Inna Evlannikova, Vadim Sotskov	Space Dogs: Adventure to the Moon	Белка и Стрелка. Лунные приключения	Belka i Strelka. Lunnyye priklyucheniya	
2014	Irina Kodyukova	Chopin	Фредерик Шопен	Frederik Shopen	
2015	**Konstantin Feoktistov**	Three heroes. Horse Course	Три богатыря. Ход конём	Tri bogatyrya. Khod konom	
2015	Svetlana Andrianova	A Little Star	Звёздочка	Zvozdochka	
2015	Sergey Antonov	Serafima's Extraordinary Travel	Необыкновенное путешествие Серафимы	Neobyknovennoye puteshestviye Serafimy	
2016	**Natalia Chernysheva**	Cat and Mouse	Кот и мышь	Kot i mysh'	
2016	Maksim Volkov	Sheep and Wolves	Волки и овцы: Бе-е-е-зумное превращение	Chernysheva	
2016	Polina Minchenok	Moroshka	Морошка	Moroshka	
2017	**Svetlana Andrianova**	Two Trams	Два трамвая	Dva tramvaya	
2017	Yuriy Ryazanov, Yuriy Kulakov	The Tale of Peter and Fevronia	Сказ о Петре и Февронии	Skaz o Petre i Fevronii	
2017	Vladimir Toropchin, Fyodor Dmitriev, Darina Shmidt	Fantastic Journey to Oz	Урфин Джюс и его деревянные солдаты	Urfin Dzhyus i yego derevyannyye soldaty	
2018	**Stanislav Sokolov**	Hoffmaniada	Гофманиада	Gofmaniada	
2018	Valentin Telegin	(unknown)†	Матрос Пётр Кошка	Matros Potr Koshka	
2018	Natalia Mirzoyan	Five Minutes To Sea	Пять минут до моря	Pyat' minut do morya	
2019	**Konstantin Bronzit**	He Can't Live Without Cosmos	Он не может жить без космоса	On ne mozhet zhit' bez kosmosa	
2019	Leonid Shmelkov	Lola the Living Potato	Лола живая картошка	Lola zhivaya kartoshka	
2019	Zhanna Bekmambetova	Tweet-tweet	Чик-Чирик	Chik-Chirik	

=== 2020s ===
Year	Director	International title	National title	Transliterated title (per BGN/PCGN standard)	Ref(s)
2020	**Dmitry Geller**	Mistress of the Copper Mountain	Хозяйка Медной горы	Khozyayka Mednoy gory	
2020	Darina Schmidt, Konstantin Feoktistov	Ivan Tsarevich and the Grey Wolf 4	Иван Царевич и Серый Волк 4	Ivan Tsarevich i Seryy Volk 4	
2020	Inna Evlannikova, Aleksandr Khramtsov	Space Dogs: Return to Earth	Белка и Стрелка. Карибская тайна	Belka i Strelka. Karibskaya tayna	
2021	**Darina Shmidt, Konstantin Feoktistov**	Horse Julius and Big Horse Racing	Конь Юлий и большие скачки	Kon' Juliy i Bol'shie Skachki	
2021	Oksana Kuvaldina	Alaska	Аляска	Alyaska	
2021	Andrey Kolpin	Koschey: The Everlasting Story	Кощей. Начало	Koschey. Nachalo	
2022	**Denis Chernov**	Finnick	Финник	Finnik	
2022	Leonid Shmelkov	Cucumbers	Огурцы	Ogurcy	
2022	Zoya Trofimova	Blue Lion	Синий лев	Sinij lev	
2023	**Vasiliy Rovenskiy**	Cats in the Museum	Коты Эрмитажа	Koty Ermitazha	
2023	Svetlana Andrianova	Kharms	Хармс	Harms	
2023	Anastasia Zhakulina	Bright souls	Светлые души	Svetlye dushi	
2024	**Oksana Kholodova**	The Extraordinary Story of One Lion	Необыкновенная история одного льва	Neobyknovennaya istoriya odnogo l'va	
2024	Vasiliy Rovenskiy	Dogs at the Opera	Великолепная пятерка	Velikolepnaya pyaterka	
2024	Aleksandr Khramtsov	The Brook That Ran Back To The Mountain	Ручей, бегущий в горы	Ruchej, begushchij v gory	
