= Chukar =

Chukar or Chakor may refer to:

== Chukar ==
- Chukar partridge (Alectoris chukar), a Eurasian upland gamebird in the pheasant family Phasianidae
- Chukar (rural locality), a rural locality (a selo) in Nyurbinsky District of the Sakha Republic, Russia
- Northrop BQM-74 Chukar, a series of aerial target drones
- Chukar Entertainment, a student organization in Treasure Valley Community College, a community college in Ontario, Oregon, US

== Chakor ==
- Chakor Buli Chavar Castle, Ilam Province, Iran
- Chakor Rural District, Ilam province, Iran
- Glimina Chakor (born 1976), Dutch politician
- Chanwa Ke Take Chakor, a 1981 Indian Bhojpuri-language film

== See also ==
- Chakora (disambiguation)
- Chukar Cherries, a Pacific Northwest food brand
- Idaho Falls Chukars, a minor-league affiliate of the Kansas City Royals baseball team
- Reno Chukars, name of Marysville Gold Sox, a US summer collegiate wood-bat club from California, in 1996–1998
