= Yedey =

Yedey (Russian: Едей) is the name of several rural localities in the Sakha Republic, Russia:

- Yedey, Khangalassky District, Sakha Republic, a selo in Malzhagarsky 4-y Rural Okrug of Khangalassky District
- Yedey, Nyurbinsky District, Sakha Republic, a selo in Yedeysky Rural Okrug of Nyurbinsky District
