= Neftebaza =

Neftebaza (Russian: Нефтебаза) is the name of several rural localities in Russia.

== Modern localities ==
- Neftebaza, Pankrushikhinsky District, Altai Krai, a settlement in Zheleznodorozhny Selsoviet of Pankrushikhinsky District in Altai Krai; 53°45′N 80°14′E
- Neftebaza, Smolensky District, Altai Krai, a settlement in Verkh-Obsky Selsoviet of Smolensky District in Altai Krai; 52°25′N 85°5′E
- Neftebaza, Altai Republic, a selo in Tenginskoye Rural Settlement of Ongudaysky District in the Altai Republic; 50°51′N 85°50′E
- Neftebaza, Republic of Karelia, a settlement in Pudozhsky District of the Republic of Karelia
- Neftebaza, Kirov Oblast, a settlement in Grekhovsky Rural Okrug of Sovetsky District in Kirov Oblast; 57°36′N 49°1′E
- Neftebaza, Perm Krai, a settlement in Osinsky District of Perm Krai
- Neftebaza, Nyurbinsky District, Sakha Republic, a selo in Oktyabrsky Rural Okrug of Nyurbinsky District in the Sakha Republic
- Neftebaza, Olyokminsky District, Sakha Republic, a selo under the administrative jurisdiction of the Town of Olyokminsk in Olyokminsky District of the Sakha Republic
- Neftebaza, Republic of Tatarstan, a settlement in Tukayevsky District of the Republic of Tatarstan
- Neftebaza, Tomsk Oblast, a village in Molchanovsky District of Tomsk Oblast

== Alternative names ==
- Neftebaza, alternative name of Zarucheyny, a settlement in Mezheg Selo Administrative Territory of Ust-Vymsky District in the Komi Republic; 62°5′N 49°22′E
