= Dikimdya =

Dikimdya (Russian: Дикимдя) is the name of several rural localities in the Sakha Republic, Russia:

- Dikimdya, Gorny District, Sakha Republic, a selo in Mytakhsky Rural Okrug of Gorny District
- Dikimdya, Nyurbinsky District, Sakha Republic, a selo in Dikimdinsky Rural Okrug of Nyurbinsky District
- Dikimdya, Olyokminsky District, Sakha Republic, a selo in Kindigirsky Rural Okrug of Olyokminsky District
