= Zharkhan =

Zharkhan (Russian: Жархан) is the name of several rural localities in the Sakha Republic, Russia.

- Zharkhan, Nyurbinsky District, Sakha Republic, a selo in Zharkhansky Rural Okrug of Nyurbinsky District
- Zharkhan, Olyokminsky District, Sakha Republic, a selo in Zharkhansky Rural Okrug of Olyokminsky District

== See also ==
- Arylakh (Zharkhan), a selo in Zharkhansky Rural Okrug of Suntarsky District of the Sakha Republic
