= Kirov, Sakha Republic =

Kirov Киров
- Selo
- Interactive map of Kirov
- Location of Kirov Kirov (Sakha Republic)
- Coordinates: 63°34′51″N 118°42′05″E
- Country: Russia
- Federal subject: Sakha Republic
- Administrative district: Nyurbinsky District
- Rural okrugSelsoviet: Tarkayinsky Rural Okrug
- Founded: 1941

Population
  - Estimate (2002): 275 )

Municipal status
  - Municipal district: Nyurbinsky Municipal District
  - Rural settlement: Tarkayinsky Rural Settlement
- Time zone: UTC+
- Postal code: 678454
- OKTMO ID: 98626455106

Kirov (Russian: Ки́ров) is a rural locality (a selo) in Tarkayinsky Rural Okrug of Nyurbinsky District in the Sakha Republic, Russia, located 63 kilometers (39 mi) from Nyurba, the administrative center of the district and 7 kilometers (4.3 mi) from Khatyn-Sysy, the administrative center of the rural okrug. Its population as of the 2002 Census was 275.
