= Khaty =

Khaty Хаты
- Selo
- Interactive map of Khaty
- Location of Khaty Khaty (Sakha Republic)
- Coordinates: 63°37′39″N 116°40′34″E
- Country: Russia
- Federal subject: Sakha Republic
- Administrative district: Nyurbinsky District
- Rural okrugSelsoviet: Megezheksky Rural Okrug

Population (2010 Census)
  - Total: 559
  - Estimate (2021): 431 (−22.9%)

Administrative status
  - Capital of: Megezheksky Rural Okrug

Municipal status
  - Municipal district: Nyurbinsky Municipal District
  - Rural settlement: Megezheksky Rural Settlement
  - Capital of: Megezheksky Rural Settlement
- Time zone: UTC+
- Postal code: 678460
- OKTMO ID: 98626440101

Khaty (Russian: Хаты; Yakut: Хатыы, Xatıı) is a rural locality (a selo), the only inhabited locality, and the administrative center of Megezheksky Rural Okrug of Nyurbinsky District in the Sakha Republic, Russia, located 124 kilometers (77 mi) from Nyurba, the administrative center of the district. Its population as of the 2010 Census was 559, of whom 275 were male and 284 female, down from 661 as recorded during the 2002 Census.
