= Malykay =

Malykay Малыкай
- Selo
- Interactive map of Malykay
- Location of Malykay Malykay (Sakha Republic)
- Coordinates: 63°30′20″N 117°01′54″E
- Country: Russia
- Federal subject: Sakha Republic
- Administrative district: Nyurbinsky District
- Rural okrugSelsoviet: Bordonsky Rural Okrug
- Elevation: 132 m (433 ft)

Population (2010 Census)
  - Total: 1,918
  - Estimate (2021): 1,697 (−11.5%)

Administrative status
  - Capital of: Bordonsky Rural Okrug

Municipal status
  - Municipal district: Nyurbinsky Municipal District
  - Rural settlement: Bordonsky Rural Settlement
  - Capital of: Bordonsky Rural Settlement
- Time zone: UTC+
- Postal code: 678461
- OKTMO ID: 98626410101

Malykay (Russian: Малыкай; Yakut: Маалыкай, Maalıkay) is a rural locality (a selo), the only inhabited locality, and the administrative center of Bordonsky Rural Okrug of Nyurbinsky District in the Sakha Republic, Russia, located 98 kilometers (61 mi) from Nyurba, the administrative center of the district. Its population as of the 2010 Census was 1,918, down from 1,972 recorded during the 2002 Census.
