= Sayylyk =

Sayylyk (Russian: Сайылык) is the name of several rural localities in the Sakha Republic, Russia:

- Sayylyk, Kobyaysky District, Sakha Republic, a selo in Mukuchunsky Rural Okrug of Kobyaysky District
- Sayylyk, Nyurbinsky District, Sakha Republic, a selo in Khorulinsky Rural Okrug of Nyurbinsky District
- Sayylyk, Ust-Yansky District, Sakha Republic, a selo in Silyannyakhsky Rural Okrug of Ust-Yansky District
- Sayylyk, Verkhnevilyuysky District, Sakha Republic, a selo in Meyiksky Rural Okrug of Verkhnevilyuysky District
