= Chakora =

Chakora may refer to:

- Chakora (mythology), mythological bird in Hinduism said to feed on moonbeams as a sign of love for the moon, based on the chukar partridge
- Chakora, Pakistan, village in Punjab, Pakistan

== See also ==
- Chukar (disambiguation)
- Chakoram, a 1994 Indian romantic drama film
- Chakoora, Pulwama, a town in Jammu and Kashmir, India
