= Engolzha =

Engolzha Энгольжа
- Selo
- Interactive map of Engolzha
- Location of Engolzha Engolzha (Sakha Republic)
- Coordinates: 63°39′31″N 118°16′33″E
- Country: Russia
- Federal subject: Sakha Republic
- Administrative district: Nyurbinsky District
- Rural okrugSelsoviet: Markhinsky Rural Okrug

Population (2010 Census)
  - Total: 563
  - Estimate (2021): 484 (−14%)

Administrative status
  - Capital of: Markhinsky Rural Okrug

Municipal status
  - Municipal district: Nyurbinsky Municipal District
  - Rural settlement: Markhinsky Rural Settlement
  - Capital of: Markhinsky Rural Settlement
- Time zone: UTC+
- Postal code: 678464
- OKTMO ID: 98626435101

Engolzha (Russian: Энгольжа; Yakut: Өҥөлдьө, Öŋölcö) is a rural locality (a selo), the only inhabited locality, and the administrative center of Markhinsky Rural Okrug of Nyurbinsky District in the Sakha Republic, Russia, located 62 kilometers (39 mi) from Nyurba, the administrative center of the district. Its population as of the 2010 Census was 563, of whom 272 were male and 291 female, up from 538 as recorded during the 2002 Census.
