= Neftebaza, Nyurbinsky District, Sakha Republic =

Neftebaza Нефтебаза
- Selo
- Interactive map of Neftebaza
- Location of Neftebaza Neftebaza (Sakha Republic)
- Coordinates: 63°16′17″N 118°28′00″E
- Country: Russia
- Federal subject: Sakha Republic
- Administrative district: Nyurbinsky District
- Rural okrugSelsoviet: Oktyabrsky Rural Okrug

Population
  - Estimate (2002): 172 )

Municipal status
  - Municipal district: Nyurbinsky Municipal District
  - Rural settlement: Oktyabrsky Rural Settlement
- Time zone: UTC+
- Postal code: 678472
- OKTMO ID: 98626445106

Neftebaza (Russian: Нефтебаза) is a rural locality (selo), in Oktyabrsky Rural Okrug of Nyurbinsky District in the Sakha Republic, Russia. It is one of two settlements in the rural okrug, the other being Antonovka, which serves as the administrative center.

Neftebaza is located 6 kilometers (3.7 mi) from Nyurba, the administrative center of the district, and 4 kilometers (2.5 mi) from Antonovka. According to the 2002 Census, it had a population of 172.
