= Bysyttakh =

Bysyttakh Бысыттах
- Selo
- Interactive map of Bysyttakh
- Location of Bysyttakh Bysyttakh (Sakha Republic)
- Coordinates: 63°34′N 117°27′E
- Country: Russia
- Federal subject: Sakha Republic
- Administrative district: Nyurbinsky District
- Rural okrugSelsoviet: Malzhagarsky Rural Okrug

Population (2010 Census)
  - Total: 550
  - Estimate (2021): 525 (−4.5%)

Administrative status
  - Capital of: Malzhagarsky Rural Okrug

Municipal status
  - Municipal district: Nyurbinsky Municipal District
  - Rural settlement: Malzhagarsky Rural Settlement
  - Capital of: Malzhagarsky Rural Settlement
- Time zone: UTC+
- Postal code: 678463
- OKTMO ID: 98626430101

Bysyttakh (Russian: Бысыттах; Yakut: Быһыттаах, Bıhıttaax) is a rural locality (a selo), the only inhabited locality, and the administrative center of Malzhagarsky Rural Okrug of Nyurbinsky District in the Sakha Republic, Russia, located 70 kilometers (43 mi) from Nyurba, the administrative center of the district. Its population as of the 2010 Census was 550, down from 558 recorded during the 2002 Census.
