= Saltany =

Saltany Салтаны
- Selo
- Interactive map of Saltany
- Location of Saltany Saltany (Sakha Republic)
- Coordinates: 63°22′N 118°43′E
- Country: Russia
- Federal subject: Sakha Republic
- Administrative district: Nyurbinsky District
- Rural okrugSelsoviet: Chappandinsky Rural Okrug

Population (2010 Census)
  - Total: 7
  - Estimate (2021): 5 (−28.6%)

Municipal status
  - Municipal district: Nyurbinsky Municipal District
  - Rural settlement: Chappandinsky Rural Settlement
- Time zone: UTC+
- Postal code: 678473
- OKTMO ID: 98626470106

Saltany (Russian: Салтаны; Yakut: Салтааны, Saltaanı) is a rural locality (a selo) in Chappandinsky Rural Okrug of Nyurbinsky District in the Sakha Republic, Russia, located 33 kilometers (21 mi) from Nyurba, the administrative center of the district, and 9 kilometers (5.6 mi) from Chappanda, the administrative center of the rural okrug. Its population as of the 2010 Census was 7, down from 15 recorded during the 2002 Census.
