= 15th Open Russian Festival of Animated Film =

Open Russian Festival of Animated Film
- Date: March 10, 2010-March 14, 2010
- Location: Suzdal
- Country: Russia
- Website: http://www.suzdalfest.ru

The 15th Open Russian Festival of Animated Film was held from Mar. 10-14 2010 in Suzdal, Russia. Animated works from the years 2009-2010 produced by citizens of Russia and Belarus were accepted, as well as works from 2008 that didn't make it into previous festivals.

This year, film screenings were separated into the categories "in competition" and "informational". Animated commercial reels, music clips and television bumpers were automatically accepted into the competition, while student or amateur works could be accepted into the competition based on the decisions of the Selection and Organizing Committees.

All films were shown in Betacam SP format (the standard format for festivals in Russia).

The jury prizes were handed out by profession. Also, any member or guest of the festival was able to vote for their favorite films.

== List of Jury Members ==
English	Russian	Profession(s)
Mikhail Aldashin	Михаил Алдашин	director, screenwriter, art director, animator, producer
Vladlen Barbè	Владлен Барбэ	director, screenwriter, art director, animator
Ivan Maximov	Иван Максимов	director, screenwriter, animator, art director, camera operator, producer
Dmitriy Naumov	Дмитрий Наумов	director, screenwriter, animator, camera operator
Mikhail Tumelya	Михаил Тумеля	director, screenwriter, animator, art director, camera operator, voice actor

== Jury prizes ==
Award	Film	Recipient(s) (the director of the film, unless stated otherwise)	Links
Grand Prix	Winter from the "Log Jam" series Зима (Zima)	Aleksey Alekseyev	
Best Direction (shared)	A Trip to the Seaside; Поездка к морю (Poyezdka k moryu); Rain in the Evening; Со вечора дождик (So vechora dozhdik)	Nina Bisyarina; Valentin Olshvang	
Best Visuals	Year Round series Цикл Круглый год» (Kryglyy god)	Anastasiya Zhakulina (art director)	
Best Animation	A Transgression; Беззаконие (Bezzakoniye)	Natalya Malgina	
Best Sound	Dog Playground; Собачья площадка (Sobachya ploshchadka)	Leonid Shmelkov	
Best Film for Children	Tracks of Unseen Beasts from the series "Masha and the Bear"; Следы невиданных зверей из сериала «Маша и медведь» (Sledy nevidannykh zverey)	Oleg Uzhinov	
Best Student Film (shared)	Bridge; Мост (Most); Bridge; Ballad About a Barber (Ballada o tsiryulnike)	Dina Velikovskaya; Yekaterina Kolosovskaya	
Best Debut Film	-not given out-		
Best Series	Portuguese Lullaby from the series "Lullabies of the World", «Португальская колыбельная» из цикла «Колыбельные мира» (Portugalskaya kolybelnaya)	Yelizaveta Skvortsova	
Best Interstitial Animation	Raskolnikov from the series "The Story Could Have Ended Differently" «Раскольников» из цикла «История могла бы пойти по-другому»	Vladimir Ponomaryov	

== Jury diplomas & other prizes ==
Award	Film	Recipient(s) (the director of the film, unless stated otherwise)	Link(s)
Diploma in Best Visual Direction "for culture and mastery"	A Transgression; Беззаконие (Bezzakoniye)	Igor Oleynikov (art director)	
Diploma in Best Student Film "for lyricism and a bright outlook"	Look Up; Посмотрите вверх (posmotrite vverkh)	Svetlana Pedyacheva	
Diploma "for cleanness and clearness"	About a Catfish; Про сома (Pro Soma)	Yulia Ruditskaya	
Diploma in Best Writing "for a well-told simple story"	Birdy; Птаха (Ptakha)	Aleksandr Lenkin, Sergey Katyer (screenwriters)	
Diploma in Best Student Film "for being touching"	Listen to the Snow Melting; Слушай, как тает снег (Slushay, kak tayet sneg)	Svetlana Razgulyayeva	
Diploma "for working with young directors"	Modern Folk Tales of the World; Современные сказки мира (Sovremennyye skazki mira)	Irina Margolina (producer)	
Diploma in Best Debut Film "for auteur visuals"	Brave Gonza; Храбрый Гонза (Khrabryy Gonza)	Ilya Suvorkin	
Prize of the Guild of Film Critics	Look Up; Посмотрите вверх (posmotrite vverkh)	Svetlana Pedyacheva	
Aleksandr Tatarskiy Prize for "an unexpected leap into a different world"	Not a Sad Story; Непечальная история (Nepechalnaya istoriya)	Mariya Muat (director); Vladimir Golovanov (screenwriter)	
"Fortuna" Prize (chosen randomly)	Look Up; Посмотрите вверх (posmotrite vverkh)	Svetlana Pedyacheva	

== Rating (by audience vote) ==
Each member of the audience was asked to list their top 5 five films of the festival. 5 points were given for a 1st place vote and so on, down to 1 point for a 5th place vote.

Position	Film	Director	Points	Link
1	Rain in the Evening; Со вечора дождик (So vechora dozhdik)	Valentin Olshvang	233	
2	A Transgression; Беззаконие (Bezzakoniye)	Natalya Malgina	218	
3	A Trip to the Seaside; Поездка к морю (Poyezdka k moryu)	Nina Bisyarina	62	
4	Harmonium; Хармониум	Dmitriy Lazarev	60	
5	Forbidden Cake; Запретный торт (Zapretnyy tort)	Roman Kazakov	54	
6	Log Jam	Aleksey Alekseyev	39	
7	Kvadraturin; Квадратурин	Valeriy Kozhin	39	
8	The Prosecutor's Son Saves the King; Сын прокурора спасает короля (Syn prokurora spasayet korolya)	Oksana Kholodova	39	
9	Tracks of Unseen Beasts from the series "Masha and the Bear"; Следы невиданных зверей из сериала «Маша и медведь» (Sledy nevidannykh zverey)	Oleg Uzhinov	33	
10	August, the Month of Winds; Та сторона, где ветер (Ta storona, gde veter)	Rim Sharafutdinov	33	
