= BGN/PCGN romanization of Russian =

Transliteration system for Cyrillic text

BGN/PCGN romanization system for Russian is a method for romanization of Cyrillic Russian texts, that is, their transliteration into the Latin alphabet as used in the English language.

There are a number of systems for romanization of Russian, but the BGN/PCGN system is relatively intuitive for anglophones to pronounce. It is part of the larger set of BGN/PCGN romanizations, which includes methods for 29 different languages. It was developed by the United States Board on Geographic Names (BGN) and by the Permanent Committee on Geographical Names for British Official Use (PCGN). The portion of the system pertaining to the Russian language was adopted by BGN in 1944, and by PCGN in 1947.

This romanization of Russian can be rendered by using only the basic letters and punctuation found on English-language keyboards. No diacritics or unusual letters are required, but the interpunct character (·) is optionally used to avoid some ambiguity.

In many publications, a simplified form of the system is used to render English versions of Russian names, which typically converts ë to yo, simplifies -iy and -yy endings to -y and omits apostrophes for ъ and ь.

The following table describes the system and provides examples.

Russian letter	Romanization	Special provision	Examples
А (а)	A (a)	None	Азов = Azov; Тамбов = Tambov
Б (б)	B (b)	None	Барнаул = Barnaul; Кубань = Kubanʼ
В (в)	V (v)	None	Владимир = Vladimir; Ульяновск = Ulʼyanovsk
Г (г)	G (g)	None	Грозный = Groznyy; Волгодонск = Volgodonsk
Д (д)	D (d)	None	Дзержинский = Dzerzhinskiy; Нелидово = Nelidovo
Е (е)	Ye (ye)	1. Word-initially; 2. after vowels; 3. after й; 4. after ь; 5. after ъ.	1. Елизово = Yelizovo; 2. Чапаевск = Chapayevsk; 3. Мейеровка = Meyyerovka; 4. Юрьев = Yurʼyev; 5. Объезд = Obˮyezd.
Е (е)	E (e)	All other cases	Белкино = Belkino
Ё (ё)	Yë (yë)	1. Word-initially; 2. after vowels; 3. after й; 4. after ь; 5. after ъ.	1. Ёдва = Yëdva; 2. Змииёвка = Zmiiyëvka; 3. Айёган = Ayyëgan; 4. Воробьёво = Vorobʼyëvo; 5. Кебанъёль = Kebanˮyëlʼ.
Ё (ё)	Ë (ë)	All other cases	Озёрный = Ozërnyy
Ж (ж)	Zh (zh)	None	Жуков = Zhukov; Лужники = Luzhniki
З (з)	Z (z)	None	Звенигород = Zvenigorod; Вязьма = Vyazʼma
И (и)	I (i)	None	Иркутск = Irkutsk; Апатиты = Apatity
Й (й)	Y· (y·)	Before а, у, ы, or э. Used primarily for romanization of non-Russian-language names from Russian spelling. The use of this digraph is optional.	Тыайа = Ty·ay·a; Сайылык = Say·ylyk; Ойусардах = Oy·usardakh
Й (й)	Y (y)	All other cases	Йошкар-Ола = Yoshkar-Ola; Бийск = Biysk
К (к)	K (k)	None	Киров = Kirov; Енисейск = Yeniseysk
Л (л)	L (l)	None	Ломоносов = Lomonosov; Нелидово = Nelidovo
М (м)	M (m)	None	Менделеев = Mendeleyev; Каменка = Kamenka
Н (н)	N (n)	None	Новосибирск = Novosibirsk; Кандалакша = Kandalaksha
О (о)	O (o)	None	Омск = Omsk; Красноярск = Krasnoyarsk
П (п)	P (p)	None	Петрозаводск = Petrozavodsk; Серпухов = Serpukhov
Р (р)	R (r)	None	Ростов = Rostov; Северобайкальск = Severobaykalʼsk
С (с)	S (s)	None	Сковородино = Skovorodino; Чайковский = Chaykovskiy
Т (т)	T (t)	None	Тамбов = Tambov; Мытищи = Mytishchi
У (у)	U (u)	None	Углич = Uglich; Дудинка = Dudinka
Ф (ф)	F (f)	None	Фурманов = Furmanov; Уфа = Ufa
Х (х)	Kh (kh)	None	Хабаровск = Khabarovsk; Прохладный = Prokhladnyy
Ц (ц)	Ts (ts)	None	Цимлянск = Tsimlyansk; Елец = Yelets
Ч (ч)	Ch (ch)	None	Чебоксары = Cheboksary; Печора = Pechora
Ш (ш)	Sh (sh)	None	Шахтёрск = Shakhtërsk; Мышкин = Myshkin
Щ (щ)	Shch (shch)	None	Щёлково = Shchëlkovo; Ртищево = Rtishchevo
Ъ (ъ)	ˮ	This letter does not occur at the beginning of a word.	Куыркъявр = Ku·yrkˮyavr
Ы (ы)	Y· (y·)	Before а, у, ы, or э. Used primarily for romanization of non-Russian-language names from Russian spelling. The use of this digraph is optional.	Ыгыатта = Ygy·atta; Тыайа = Ty·ay·a; Тыэкан = Ty·ekan
Ы (ы)	·y	After any vowel. Used primarily for romanization of non-Russian-language names from Russian spelling. The use of this digraph is optional.	Суык-Су = Su·yk-Su; Куыркъявр = Ku·yrkˮyavr
Ы (ы)	Y (y)	All other cases. This letter does not occur at the beginning of words of Russian origin.	Ыттык-Кюёль = Yttyk-Kyuyëlʼ; Тында = Tynda
Ь (ь)	ʼ	This letter does not occur at the beginning of a word.	Тюмень = Tyumenʼ
Э (э)	·e	After any consonant except й. Used primarily for romanization of non-Russian-language names from Russian spelling. The use of this digraph is optional.	Улан-Удэ = Ulan-Ud·e
Э (э)	E (e)	All other cases	Электрогорск = Elektrogorsk; Руэм = Ruem
Ю (ю)	Yu (yu)	None	Юбилейный = Yubileynyy; Ключевская = Klyuchevskaya
Я (я)	Ya (ya)	None	Якутск = Yakut·sk; Брянск = Bryansk
Тс (тс)	T·s (t·s)	Used primarily for romanization of non-Russian-language names from Russian spelling. The use of this digraph is optional.	Вяртсиля = Vyart·silya
Шч (шч)	Sh·ch (sh·ch)	Used primarily for romanization of non-Russian-language names from Russian spelling. The use of this digraph is optional.	Ташчишма = Tash·chishma

== See also ==
- ISO 9
- GOST 16876-71
- Wikipedia:Romanization of Russian
