= Nyurbachan =

Nyurbachan Нюрбачан
- Selo
- Interactive map of Nyurbachan
- Location of Nyurbachan Nyurbachan (Sakha Republic)
- Coordinates: 63°20′04″N 118°06′21″E
- Country: Russia
- Federal subject: Sakha Republic
- Administrative district: Nyurbinsky District
- Rural okrugSelsoviet: Nyurbachansky Rural Okrug

Population (2010 Census)
  - Total: 630
  - Estimate (2021): 548 (−13%)

Administrative status
  - Capital of: Nyurbachansky Rural Okrug

Municipal status
  - Municipal district: Nyurbinsky Municipal District
  - Rural settlement: Nyurbachansky Rural Settlement
  - Capital of: Nyurbachansky Rural Settlement
- Time zone: UTC+
- Postal code: 678475
- OKTMO ID: 98626450101

Nyurbachan (Russian: Нюрбачан; Yakut: Ньурбачаан, romanized: Ņurbaçaan) is a rural locality (a selo), the only inhabited locality, and the administrative center of Nyurbachansky Rural Okrug of Nyurbinsky District in the Sakha Republic, Russia, located 12 kilometers (7.5 mi) from Nyurba, the administrative center of the district. Its population as of the 2010 Census was 630, down from 633 recorded during the 2002 Census.
