= Ynakhsyt =

Ynakhsyt Ынахсыт
- Selo
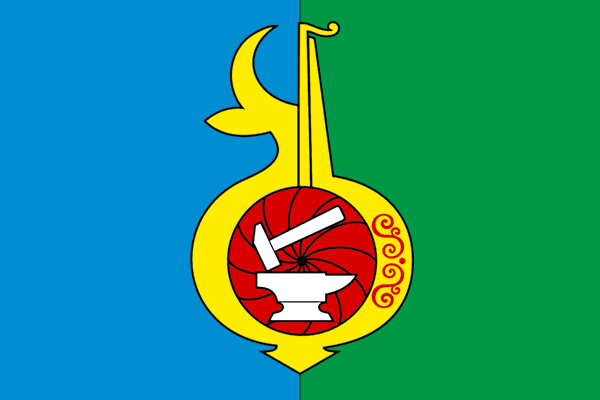
- Flag
- Interactive map of Ynakhsyt
- Location of Ynakhsyt Ynakhsyt (Sakha Republic)
- Coordinates: 63°34′05″N 119°12′29″E
- Country: Russia
- Federal subject: Sakha Republic
- Administrative district: Nyurbinsky District
- Rural okrugSelsoviet: Kangalassky Rural Okrug

Population (2010 Census)
  - Total: 608
  - Estimate (2021): 582 (−4.3%)

Administrative status
  - Capital of: Kangalassky Rural Okrug

Municipal status
  - Municipal district: Nyurbinsky Municipal District
  - Rural settlement: Kangalassky Rural Settlement
  - Capital of: Kangalassky Rural Settlement
- Time zone: UTC+
- Postal code: 678456
- OKTMO ID: 98626420101

Ynakhsyt (Russian: Ынахсыт; Yakut: Ынахсыт, Inaxsıt) is a rural locality (a selo), the only inhabited locality, and the administrative center of Kangalassky Rural Okrug of Nyurbinsky District in the Sakha Republic, Russia, located 62 kilometers (39 mi) from Nyurba, the administrative center of the district. Its population as of the 2010 Census was 608, of whom 289 were male and 319 female, up from 606 as recorded during the 2002 Census.
