= Chkalov, Nyurbinsky District, Sakha Republic =

Chkalov Чкалов
- Selo
- Interactive map of Chkalov
- Location of Chkalov Chkalov (Sakha Republic)
- Coordinates: 63°41′55″N 119°15′32″E
- Country: Russia
- Federal subject: Sakha Republic
- Administrative district: Nyurbinsky District
- Rural okrugSelsoviet: Akaninsky Rural Okrug
- Founded: 1947

Population (2010 Census)
  - Total: 77
  - Estimate (2021): 30 (−61%)

Municipal status
  - Municipal district: Nyurbinsky Municipal District
  - Rural settlement: Akaninsky Rural Settlement
- Time zone: UTC+
- Postal code: 678457
- OKTMO ID: 98626405106

Chkalov (Russian: Чкалов) is a rural locality (a selo), one of two settlements, in addition to Akana, the administrative centre of the Rural Okrug, in Akaninsky Rural Okrug of Nyurbinsky District in the Sakha Republic, Russia. It is located 85 kilometers (53 mi) from Nyurba, the administrative center of the district and 15 kilometers (9.3 mi) from Akana. Its population as of the 2010 Census was 77; down from 98 recorded during the 2002 Census.
