= Syulya =

Syulya Сюля
- Selo
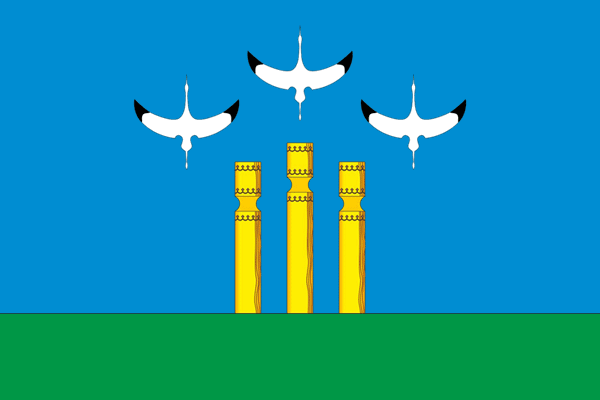
- Flag
- Location of Syulya
- Location of Syulya Syulya (Sakha Republic)
- Coordinates: 63°20′07″N 118°17′42″E
- Country: Russia
- Federal subject: Sakha Republic
- Administrative district: Nyurbinsky District
- Rural okrug: Syulinsky Rural Okrug

Population (2010 Census)
  - Total: 526

Administrative status
  - Capital of: Syulinsky Rural Okrug

Municipal status
  - Municipal district: Nyurbinsky Municipal District
  - Rural settlement: Syulinsky Rural Settlement
  - Capital of: Syulinsky Rural Settlement
- Time zone: UTC+9 (MSK+6)
- Postal code(s): 678459
- OKTMO ID: 98626452101

Syulya (Russian: Сюля; Yakut: Сүлэ, Süle) is a rural locality (a selo), the only inhabited locality, and the administrative center of Syulinsky Rural Okrug of Nyurbinsky District in the Sakha Republic, Russia, located 7 kilometers (4.3 mi) from Nyurba, the administrative center of the district. Its population as of the 2010 Census was 526; up from 474 recorded in the 2002 Census.
