= 13th Open Russian Festival of Animated Film =

The 13th Open Russian Festival of Animated Film was held from February 28 to March 3, 2008, in Suzdal, Russia. The winners for all of the main award categories were announced on March 2. The jury consisted of 33 professionals in a variety of different professions related to animation. 85 films, totaling over 14 hours of running time, were screened. This was the first festival held after the death of Aleksandr Tatarskiy, who had headed all the previous festivals. The artistic director in his place was Aleksandr Gerasimov.

== Main awards ==
Award	Film	Recipient(s) (the director of the film, unless stated otherwise)	Links
Grand Prix	Rain Down from Above; Дождь сверху вниз (Dozhd sverkhu vniz)	Ivan Maximov	
Best Direction	Rain Down from Above; Дождь сверху вниз (Dozhd sverkhu vniz)	Ivan Maximov	
Best Dramaturgy	Romance in Letters; Роман в письмах (Roman v pismakh) (part of Smeshariki series)	Aleksey Lebedev	
Best Visuals	Him and Her; Он и она (On i ona)	Marina Kurshevskaya (art director); Maria Muat	
Best Animation	Him and Her; Он и она (On i ona)	Maria Muat	
Best Sound	Lullaby; Колыбельная (Kolybelnaya)	Andrey Zolotukhin; Oleg Karavaychuk (composer)	
Best Film for Children	Little Vasilisa; Маленькая Василиса (Malenkaya Vasilisa)	Darina Shmidt	
Best Student Film	Memorigami	Polina Grekova	
Best Debut Film	Little Vasilisa; Маленькая Василиса (Malenkaya Vasilisa)	Darina Shmidt	
Best Series	Lullabies of the World, Колыбельные мира (Kolubelnyye mira)	Yelizaveta Skvortsova	
Best Feature Film	Granny Yozhka and Others, Бабка Ёжка и другие (Babka Yozhka i drugiye)	Valeriy Ugarov	
Best Interstitial Animation	Social Reels "Rules of the Road"	Yelena Chernova	

== Other prizes ==
Award	Film	Recipient(s) (the director of the film, unless stated otherwise)	Link(s)
"Fortuna" Prize (chosen randomly)	Menu; Меню	Aida Zyablikova	
Aleksandr Tatarskiy Prize (decided posthumously by the masters Norshteyn, Nazarov and Golovanov)	Poor Yorik; Бедный Йорик (Bednyy Yorik)	Sergey Gordeyev	
Prize of Audience Sympathies (viewers from Rambler Vision)	Kuygorozh; Куйгорож	Sergey Merinov	

== Jury rating ==
Each jury member was asked to list their top 5 five films of the festival. 5 points were given for a 1st place vote and so on, down to 1 point for a 5th place vote. An official award was given to the top three films at the closing ceremony.

Position	Film	Points	Link
1	Rain Down from Above; Дождь сверху вниз (Dozhd sverkhu vniz)	64	
2	Boy; Мальчик (Malchik)	56	
3	Him and Her; Он и она (On i ona)	37	
4	The Hare-Servant; Заяц-слуга (Zayats-sluga)	35	
5	The Polar Hole; Полярная яма (Polyarnaya yama)	34	
6	Little Vasilisa; Маленькая Василиса (Malenkaya Vasilisa)	33	
7	Kuygorozh; Куйгорож	23	
8	The Proud Mouse; Гордый мыш (Gordyy mysh)	22	
9	Three Love Stories; Три истории любви (Tri istoriyi lyubvi)	17	
10	Fool... Глупая... (Glupaya...)	13	
11	Granny Yozhka and Others; Бабка Ёжка и другие (Babka Yozhka i drugiye)	12	
12	The Mouse and the Fox; Мышонок и лис (Myshonok i lis)	11	
13	Moon/Mars; Луна/Марс (Luna/Mars)	11	
14	A Street Sweeper on the Moon; Дворник на Луне (Dvornik na Lune)	9	
15	Hedgehog in the Fogginess; Ёжик в туманности (Yozhik v tumannosti)	8	
16	Poor Yorik; Бедный Йорик (Bednyy Yorik)	8	
17	Lullaby; Колыбельная (Золотухин) (Kolybelnaya)	8	
18	Chepogi; Чепоги	7	
19	Lost Time in Clerkenwell; Потерянное время в Клеркенвелле (Poteryannoye vremya v Klerkenvelle)	5	
20	Rumpelstiltskin; Румпельштильцхен (Roompelshtiltskhen)	5	
21	The Dog Door; Собачья дверца (Sobachya dvertsa)	5	
22	Wallace's Lists; Списки Уоллиса (Spiski Uollisa)	5	
23	The Bear Corner; Медвежий угол (Medvezhiy ugol)	4	
24	How I Caught Little Men; Как я ловил человечков (Kak ya lovil chelovechkov)	4	
25	The Menu; Меню (Menu)	4	
26	The Snowdrop; Подснежник (Podsnezhnik)	4	
27	Oskul-Ol the Fisherman; Рыбак Оскул-Оол (Rybak Oskul-Ol)	4	
28	Two Italians; Два итальянца (Dva italyantsa)	3	
29	Social Reels "Rules of the Road"; Социальные ролики «Правила дорожного движения» (Sotsialnyye roliki "Pravila dorozhnovo dvizheniya")	3	
30	Romance in Letters; Роман в письмах (Roman v pismakh)	1	
31	Evenk Lullaby; Эвенская колыбельная (Evenskaya kolybelnaya)	1	
