= Nyurba Airport =

- IATA: NYR; ICAO: UENN; LID: НЮР

Summary
- Airport type: Public
- Serves: Nyurba, Nyurbinsky District, Sakha Republic, Russia
- Coordinates: 63°17′50″N 118°20′49″E

Maps
- Sakha Republic in Russia

- Location of the airport in the Sakha Republic

Runways
Direction	Length		Surface
Direction	m	ft	Surface
16/34	1,300	4,265	Asphalt
- Sources: GCM, STV

Nyurba Airport (IATA: NYR, ICAO: UENN) is an airport serving the urban locality of Nyurba, Nyurbinsky District, in the Sakha Republic of Russia.

== Airlines and destinations ==
Airlines	Destinations
Polar Airlines	Yakutsk

== See also ==
- List of airports in Russia
