= Chappanda =

Chappanda Чаппанда
- Selo
- Interactive map of Chappanda
- Location of Chappanda Chappanda (Sakha Republic)
- Coordinates: 63°25′16″N 118°39′19″E
- Country: Russia
- Federal subject: Sakha Republic
- Administrative district: Nyurbinsky District
- Rural okrugSelsoviet: Chappandinsky Rural Okrug

Population
  - Estimate (2002): 998 )

Administrative status
  - Capital of: Chappandinsky Rural Okrug

Municipal status
  - Municipal district: Namsky Municipal District
  - Rural settlement: Chappandinsky Rural Settlement
  - Capital of: Chappandinsky Rural Settlement
- Time zone: UTC+
- Postal code: 678473
- OKTMO ID: 98626470101

Chappanda (Russian: Чаппанда; Yakut: Чаппанда, Çappanda) is a rural locality (a selo), the administrative centre of and one of two settlements, in addition to Saltany, in Chappandinsky Rural Okrug of Nyurbinsky District in the Sakha Republic, Russia. It is located 24 kilometers (15 mi) from Nyurba, the administrative center of the district. Its population as of the 2002 Census was 998.
