= Mar, Russia =

Mar Мар
- Selo

Other transcription(s)
  - Yakut: Маар
- Interactive map of Mar
- Location of Mar Mar (Sakha Republic)
- Coordinates: 63°31′26″N 118°59′32″E
- Country: Russia
- Federal subject: Sakha Republic
- Administrative district: Nyurbinsky District
- Rural okrugSelsoviet: Tyumyuksky Rural Okrug

Population (2010 Census)
  - Total: 1,034
  - Estimate (2021): 933 (−9.8%)

Administrative status
  - Capital of: Tyumyuksky Rural Okrug

Municipal status
  - Municipal district: Nyurbinsky Municipal District
  - Rural settlement: Tyumyuksky Rural Settlement
  - Capital of: Tyumyuksky Rural Settlement
- Time zone: UTC+
- Postal code: 678455
- OKTMO ID: 98626460101

Mar (Russian: Мар; Yakut: Маар, romanized: Maar) is a rural locality (a selo), the only inhabited locality, and the administrative center of Tyumyuksky Rural Okrug of Nyurbinsky District in the Sakha Republic, Russia, located 48 kilometers (30 mi) from Nyurba, the administrative center of the district. Its population as of the 2010 Census was 1,061, of whom 504 were male and 530 female, down from 1,110 as recorded during the 2002 Census.
