= Akana, Russia =

Akana Акана
- Selo
- Interactive map of Akana
- Location of Akana Akana (Sakha Republic)
- Coordinates: 63°35′56″N 119°05′43″E
- Country: Russia
- Federal subject: Sakha Republic
- Administrative district: Nyurbinsky District
- Rural okrugSelsoviet: Akaninsky Rural Okrug
- Elevation: 195 m (640 ft)

Population (2010 Census)
  - Total: 461
  - Estimate (2021): 396 (−14.1%)

Administrative status
  - Capital of: Akaninsky Rural Okrug

Municipal status
  - Municipal district: Namsky Municipal District
  - Rural settlement: Akaninsky Rural Settlement
  - Capital of: Akaninsky Rural Settlement
- Time zone: UTC+
- Postal code: 678457
- OKTMO ID: 98626405101

Akana (Russian: Акана; Yakut: Акана) is a rural locality (a selo), the administrative centre of and one of two settlements, in addition to Chkalov, in Akaninsky Rural Okrug of Nyurbinsky District in the Sakha Republic, Russia. It is located 70 kilometers (43 mi) from Nyurba, the administrative center of the district. Its population as of the 2010 Census was 461; down from 495 recorded during the 2002 Census.
