= Georgi Gitis =

Russian animator, director and producer (born 1977)

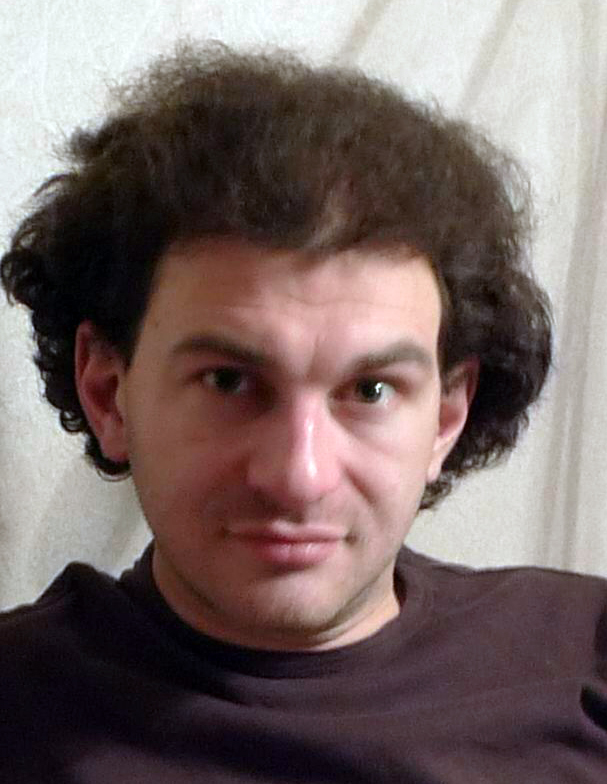
- Gitis in Moscow, 2011
- Born: Georgi Kel'manovich Gitis; March 2, 1977; Moscow, USSR
- Occupation(s): Animator; Director

Georgi Kel'manovich Gitis (Russian: Георгий Кельманович Гитис; born 1977) is a Russian animator, director and producer.

He graduated from the Gerasimov Institute of Cinematography in 2001. There he completed his first animated film SemsOrochek (Russian: СемьсОрочек) in cooperation with Liza Skvortsova. From 2002 to 2004, he worked as a director and animator in the animation TV series Dyatlovy (REN TV Channel), which has won several awards at the Russian animation films festivals.

In 2008 and 2009, he worked at Paradise Studio as the director of the animated feature film Priklyuchenya Alenushki i Eremi (which became the first Russian 3D animation film in wide release) and its sequel Novye priklyucheniya Alenushki i Eremy. His Novye priklyucheniya Alenushki i Eremy won the Best Animation Award at the Kinotavrik-2010.

Since 2012, he has worked as executive producer and director at CTB Studio (animated feature films Ku! Kin-dza-dza, Kak poymat pero Zhar-Ptitsy).

== Filmography ==
- SemsOrochek (СемьсОрочек, 1999); director
- Dyatlovy (Дятловы, 2002–2004); director
- Za sokrovischami (За сокровищами, 2004–2005); director
- Lullabies of the World (Колыбельные мира, 2005–2009); writer
- Priklyuchenya Alenushki i Eremi (Приключения Алёнушки и Ерёмы, 2008); director
- Novye priklyucheniya Alenushki i Eremy (Новые приключения Алёнушки и Ерёмы, 2009); director
- Vse - pobediteli (Все - победители, 2013); director, executive producer
- Ku! Kin-dza-dza (Ку! Кин-дза-дза, 2013); executive producer
- Kak poymat pero Zhar-Ptitsy (Как поймать перо жар-птицы); director, executive producer
