= Full Pipe =

2003 video game

- Russian cover art
- Developer: Pipe Studio
- Publishers: WW: 1C Company; EU: Daedalic Entertainment
- Platform: Microsoft Windows
- Release: CIS: November 28, 2003; WW: December 18, 2006; EU: July 27, 2010
- Genre: Adventure
- Mode: Single-player

Full Pipe (Total Flush) (Russian: Полная Труба, Polnaya Truba) is a computer game developed by Russian Pipe Studio. It features a script and animation by celebrated Russian cartoonist Ivan Maximov.

== Release history ==
Full Pipe (Total Flush) was released in November 2003 for Russia, CIS, and Baltic states as part of the 1С: Game collection series (Russian: 1C:Коллекция игрушек), and it received its first international release the following month in Lithuania under the title Pilnas Vamzdis. After being discovered by Tom Hall and John Romero at the Russian Game Developer's Conference (KRI-2004), distribution rights were discussed, and a localized version of the game was released (via download only) on Steam in 2006. According to staff from the 1C display at KRI-2004, the game created such a favorable impression upon Mr. Hall and Mr. Romero that the pair had to be removed from the demonstration by force. The game was released in Germany, Austria, and Switzerland by the distributor, Daedalic Entertainment, in July 2010. In September 2015, the game was released on Apple's App Store and the Google Play Store.

== Gameplay ==
The game revolves around navigating a main character named Dude from the third-person perspective about a secret landscape under his bed in search of a lost slipper. The game is in 2D and consists of a number of puzzles centered on using items collected and interacting with the 45 other NPCs. There is no dialogue in the game and the difficulty often derives from trying to determine why a character behaves in the way it does. Solutions to the puzzles are often illogical, in keeping with the atmosphere of the game which has been described as psychedelic.

== Reception ==
Critical reception of Full Pipe has been mixed:

- Adventure Gamers' Jack Allin scored the Steam version of the game 2 out of 5 stars, describing the gameplay as "tedious" and "frustrating", its plot as "completely lack[ing]", and its puzzles as "poor quality".
- Game score aggregator, Metacritic, lists positive scores from organizations including GamingXP, which gave the game an 83 out of 100.
