= Yedey, Nyurbinsky District, Sakha Republic =

Yedey Едей
- Selo

Other transcription(s)
  - Yakut: Үөдэй
- Interactive map of Yedey
- Location of Yedey Yedey (Sakha Republic)
- Coordinates: 63°35′53″N 119°27′26″E
- Country: Russia
- Federal subject: Sakha Republic
- Administrative district: Nyurbinsky District
- Rural okrugSelsoviet: Yedeysky Rural Okrug

Population (2010 Census)
  - Total: 190
  - Estimate (2021): 186 (−2.1%)

Administrative status
  - Capital of: Yedeysky Rural Okrug

Municipal status
  - Municipal district: Nyurbinsky Municipal District
  - Rural settlement: Yedeysky Rural Settlement
  - Capital of: Yedeysky Rural Settlement
- Time zone: UTC+
- Postal codes: 678465, 678456
- OKTMO ID: 98626414101

Yedey (Russian: Едей; Yakut: Үөдэй, romanized: Üödey) is a rural locality (a selo), the only inhabited locality, and the administrative center of Yedeysky Rural Okrug of Nyurbinsky District in the Sakha Republic, Russia, located 77 kilometers (48 mi) from Nyurba, the administrative center of the district. Its population as of the 2010 Census was 190, down from 192 recorded during the 2002 Census.
