= Zharkhan, Nyurbinsky District, Sakha Republic =

Zharkhan Жархан
- Selo

Other transcription(s)
  - Yakut: Дьаархан
- Interactive map of Zharkhan
- Location of Zharkhan Zharkhan (Sakha Republic)
- Coordinates: 63°30′22″N 118°48′32″E
- Country: Russia
- Federal subject: Sakha Republic
- Administrative district: Nyurbinsky District
- Rural okrugSelsoviet: Zharkhansky Rural Okrug

Population (2010 Census)
  - Total: 1,918
  - Estimate (2021): 363 (−81.1%)

Administrative status
  - Capital of: Zharkhansky Rural Okrug

Municipal status
  - Municipal district: Nyurbinsky Municipal District
  - Rural settlement: Zharkhansky Rural Settlement
  - Capital of: Zharkhansky Rural Settlement
- Time zone: UTC+
- Postal code: 678458
- OKTMO ID: 98626415101

Zharkhan (Russian: Жархан; Yakut: Дьаархан, romanized: Caarxan) is a rural locality (a selo), the only inhabited locality, and the administrative center of Zharkhansky Rural Okrug of Nyurbinsky District in the Sakha Republic, Russia, located 39 kilometers (24 mi) from Nyurba, the administrative center of the district. Its population as of the 2010 Census was 408, of whom 219 were male and 189 female, up from 405 as recorded during the 2002 Census.
