= Sayylyk, Nyurbinsky District, Sakha Republic =

Sayylyk Сайылык
- Selo
- Interactive map of Sayylyk
- Location of Sayylyk Sayylyk (Sakha Republic)
- Coordinates: 63°59′N 118°39′E
- Country: Russia
- Federal subject: Sakha Republic
- Administrative district: Nyurbinsky District
- Rural okrugSelsoviet: Khorulinsky Rural Okrug

Population (2010 Census)
  - Total: 786
  - Estimate (2021): 780 (−0.8%)

Administrative status
  - Capital of: Khorulinsky Rural Okrug

Municipal status
  - Municipal district: Nyurbinsky Municipal District
  - Rural settlement: Khorulinsky Rural Settlement
  - Capital of: Khorulinsky Rural Settlement
- Time zone: UTC+
- Postal code: 678465
- OKTMO ID: 98626465101

Sayylyk (Russian: Сайылык; Yakut: Сайылык, Sayılık) is a rural locality (a selo), the only inhabited locality, and the administrative center of Khorulinsky Rural Okrug of Nyurbinsky District in the Sakha Republic, Russia, located 116 kilometers (72 mi) from Nyurba, the administrative center of the district. Its population as of the 2010 Census was 786, down from 835 recorded during the 2002 Census.
