= Inna Evlannikova =

Russian film director, animator and screenwriter

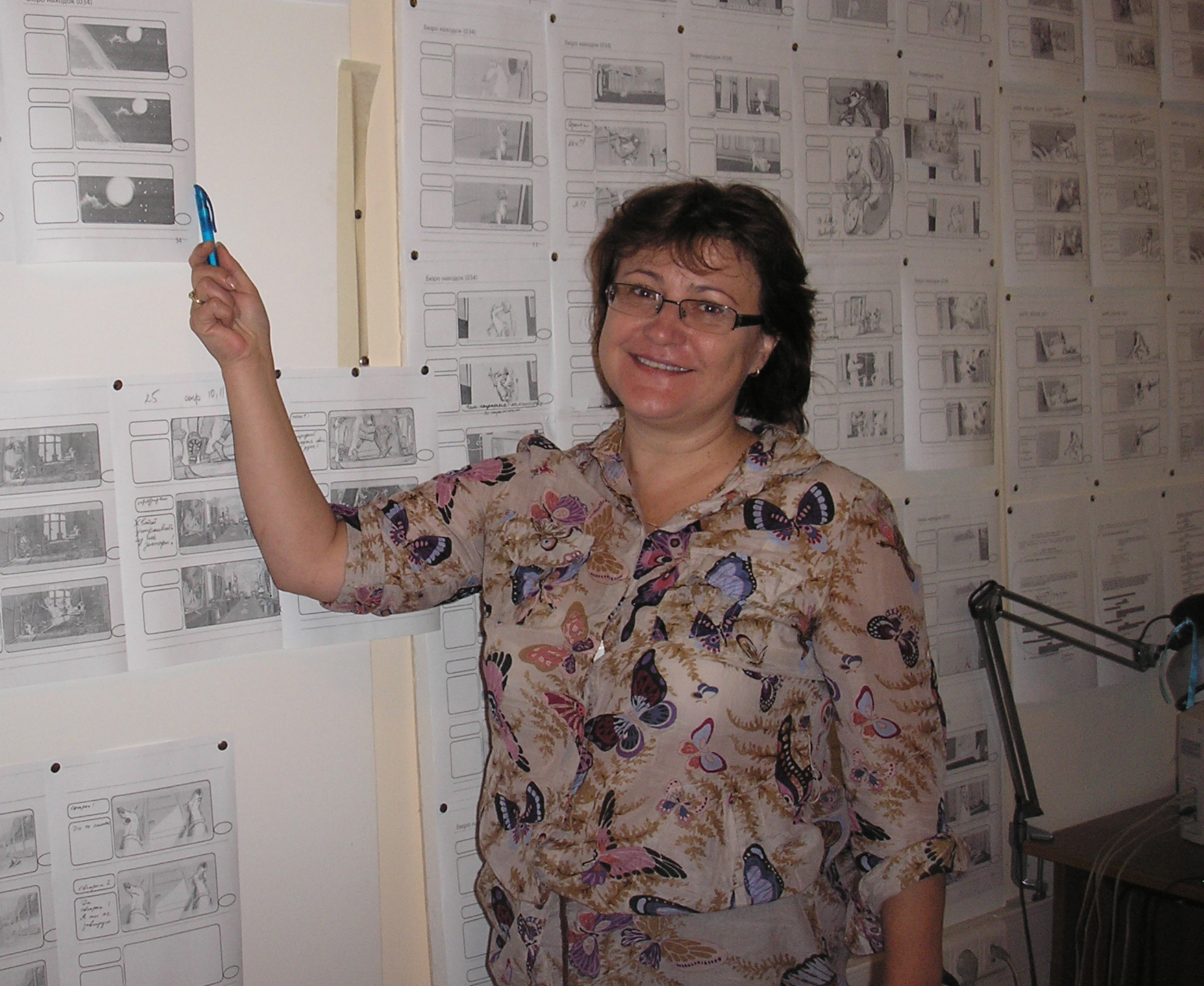
Inna Evlannikova, 2012

Inna Evlannikova (Russian: И́нна Фе́ликсовна Евла́нникова; born May 5, 1964) is a Russian film director, animator, and screenwriter.

She graduated from the Moscow Architectural Institute in 1987 and from animation courses of the Animation Cinematography Lyceum (лицей анимационной кинематографи)и in 1993.

She is the recipient of the Golden Eagle Award for Best Animation for the 2010 film Space Dogs

== Filmography ==
Films she directed include:

- 2020: Space Dogs: Return to Earth
- 2017: Harvie and the Magic Museum
- 2014: Space Dogs: Adventure to the Moon
- 2013: Space Dogs: Family (TV series fo two films)
- 2010: Space Dogs

=== Animator ===
- 1997: Dunno on the Moon
