= Chukar (rural locality) =

Chukar Чукар
- Selo
- Interactive map of Chukar
- Location of Chukar Chukar (Sakha Republic)
- Coordinates: 63°44′53″N 117°58′01″E
- Country: Russia
- Federal subject: Sakha Republic
- Administrative district: Nyurbinsky District
- Rural okrugSelsoviet: Chukarsky Rural Okrug

Population (2010 Census)
  - Total: 741
  - Estimate (2021): 614 (−17.1%)

Administrative status
  - Capital of: Chukarsky Rural Okrug

Municipal status
  - Municipal district: Nyurbinsky Municipal District
  - Rural settlement: Chukarsky Rural Settlement
  - Capital of: Chukarsky Rural Settlement
- Time zone: UTC+
- Postal code: 678462
- OKTMO ID: 98626475101

Chukar (Russian: Чукар; Yakut: Чуукаар, Çuukaar) is a rural locality (a selo), the only inhabited locality, and the administrative center of Chukarsky Rural Okrug of Nyurbinsky District in the Sakha Republic, Russia, located 80 kilometers (50 mi) from Nyurba, the administrative center of the district. Its population as of the 2010 Census was 741, down from 819 as recorded during the 2002 Census.
