= Antonovka, Sakha Republic =

Antonovka Антоновка
- Selo
- Interactive map of Antonovka
- Location of Antonovka Antonovka (Sakha Republic)
- Coordinates: 63°18′N 118°24′E
- Country: Russia
- Federal subject: Sakha Republic
- Administrative district: Nyurbinsky District
- Rural okrugSelsoviet: Oktyabrsky Rural Okrug

Population (2010 Census)
  - Total: 2,642
  - Estimate (2021): 3,102 (+17.4%)

Administrative status
  - Capital of: Oktyabrsky Rural Okrug

Municipal status
  - Municipal district: Nyurbinsky Municipal District
  - Rural settlement: Oktyabrsky Rural Settlement
  - Capital of: Oktyabrsky Rural Settlement
- Time zone: UTC+
- Postal code: 678472
- OKTMO ID: 98626445101

Antonovka (Russian: Антоновка) is a rural locality (a selo) and the administrative center of Oktyabrsky Rural Okrug of Nyurbinsky District in the Sakha Republic, Russia, located 2 kilometers (1.2 mi) from Nyurba, the administrative center of the district. Its population as of the 2010 Census was 2,642; up from 2,514 recorded in the 2002 Census.
