= Dikimdya, Nyurbinsky District, Sakha Republic =

Dikimdya Дикимдя
- Selo
- Interactive map of Dikimdya
- Location of Dikimdya Dikimdya (Sakha Republic)
- Coordinates: 63°23′01″N 118°20′33″E
- Country: Russia
- Federal subject: Sakha Republic
- Administrative district: Nyurbinsky District
- Rural okrugSelsoviet: Dikimdinsky Rural Okrug

Population (2010 Census)
  - Total: 328
  - Estimate (2021): 333 (+1.5%)

Administrative status
  - Capital of: Dikimdinsky Rural Okrug

Municipal status
  - Municipal district: Nyurbinsky Municipal District
  - Rural settlement: Dikimdinsky Rural Settlement
  - Capital of: Dikimdinsky Rural Settlement
- Time zone: UTC+
- Postal code: 678459
- OKTMO ID: 98626413101

Dikimdya (Russian: Дикимдя; Yakut: Дьиикимдэ, Ciikimde) is a rural locality (a selo), the only inhabited locality, and the administrative center of Dikimdinsky Rural Okrug of Nyurbinsky District in the Sakha Republic, Russia, located 14 kilometers (8.7 mi) from Nyurba, the administrative center of the district. Its population as of the 2010 Census was 328, of whom 171 were male and 157 female, down from 352 as recorded during the 2002 Census.
