= Khatyn-Sysy =

Khatyn-Sysy Хатын-Сысы
- Selo
- Interactive map of Khatyn-Sysy
- Location of Khatyn-Sysy Khatyn-Sysy (Sakha Republic)
- Coordinates: 63°35′31″N 118°50′44″E
- Country: Russia
- Federal subject: Sakha Republic
- Administrative district: Nyurbinsky District
- Rural okrugSelsoviet: Tarkayinsky Rural Okrug
- Elevation: 116 m (381 ft)

Population
  - Estimate (2002): 789 )

Administrative status
  - Capital of: Tarkayinsky Rural Okrug

Municipal status
  - Municipal district: Nyurbinsky Municipal District
  - Rural settlement: Tarkayinsky Rural Settlement
  - Capital of: Tarkayinsky Rural Settlement
- Time zone: UTC+
- Postal code: 678454
- OKTMO ID: 98626455101

Khatyn-Sysy (Russian: Хатын-Сысы; Yakut: Хатыҥ Сыһыы, Xatıŋ Sıhıı) is a rural locality (a selo) and the administrative center of Tarkayinsky Rural Okrug of Nyurbinsky District in the Sakha Republic, Russia, 56 kilometers (35 mi) from Nyurba, the administrative center of the district. Its population as of the 2002 Census was 789.
