= Space Dogs: Return to Earth =

- Theatrical release poster
- Directed by: Inna Evlannikova
- Written by: Danil Trotsenko; Artem Milovanov; Mike Disa; Olga Nikiforova; Viktor Strelchenko
- Produced by: Sergey Zernov; Vadim Sotskov Lyubov Kuznetsova; Nikolai Makovsky; Anastasia Lunkova
- Starring: Yulia Peresild; Irina Pegova (ru); Yevgeny Mironov; Sergey Burunov; English; Maria Antonieta Monge; Mauriett Chayeb; Jinon Deeb
- Music by: Ivan Uryupin
- Animation by: Alexey Chistov; Stepan Grudinin
- Production companies: KinoAtis; Gorky Film Studio
- Distributed by: Karoprokat
- Release date: 24 September 2020
- Running time: 80 minutes
- Country: Russia
- Languages: Russian; English

Space Dogs: Return to Earth (Russian: Белка и Стрелка: Карибская тайна, romanized: Belka i Strelka: Karibskaya Tayna, lit. 'Belka and Strelka: Caribbean Mystery') also known as Space Dogs: Tropical Adventure is a 2020 Russian 3D animated comedy fantasy family film written by Danil Trotensko, Artem Milovanov, Mike Disa, Olga Nikiforova, Viktor Strelchencko and directed by Inna Evlannikova. The film was produced by Moscow studios KinoAtis and Gorky Film Studio. The creators from one of Russia's first national 3D animation studio rejoined to continue to animate the latest adventure of the canine heroes, Belka and Strelka.

The film is the third installment in the Space Dogs franchise, a sequel to the 2014 film Space Dogs: Adventure to the Moon and a trequel to the original record breaking film Space Dogs. The film is the final installment that marks the establishment of the Space Dogs trilogy. Loosely based on true events, the film depicts Soviet space dogs Belka and Strelka, who are the world's first animals who were sent into space and survived the trip (on board the Korabl-Sputnik 2 mission in 1960). The film portrays the historical characters in a lighthearted comedy animation film.

The film is set in outer space and then on planet Earth, where the Soviet command sends Belka and Strelka on a reconnaissance mission to Cuba; there, a mysterious tornado has begun to pull in water off the coast of the island. The astronauts dive into the Caribbean Sea to solve the mystery.

Space Dogs: Return to Earth was released in Russia on 24 September 2020 and the UK on 11 December 2020. Epic Pictures distributed the film in North America on 2 April 2021. Critics from domestic and international countries had generally positive reviews for the film.

== Plot ==
In the Hurricane Alley, a strange whirlpool spins out of control. Meanwhile, brave cosmonauts Belka and Strelka are in their spaceship. They extract rare mineral samples somewhere in the asteroid belt near Saturn. They risk their lives to extract the samples when they receive a call from Soviet command. The director reports a mysterious phenomenon in the tropics of the Atlantic Ocean. Strelka is promoted as pilot because the space command director found Belka's steering to be lacking. As the ship changes course both cosmonauts become distanced due to the promotion. But the space explorers realize that this new mission will require teamwork, making them friends again.

The spaceship's trajectory veers to planet Earth. Meanwhile, their best friend, rat Lenny is looking to get to the cyclones too, traveling by plane to Cuba, with a musical ensemble, in an attempt to solve the mystery. Lenny will be accompanied by cricket Thomas. At the airport Lenny meets another traveler Maria (a muskrat), and immediately falls in love with her. While Lenny and Cricket are being mugged by local thug parrots, Maria helps them and they go and meet Uncle Sasha together.

Belka and Strelka spot the anomaly that appears to be a cyclone. As they venture down into the swirling ocean depths, their Soviet module crash lands on water into the Caribbean Sea. Lenny and his team hear of this misfortune through Uncle Yasha's radio.

Belka and Strelka are made prisoners on a ship of pirate jellyfishes. Soon Lenny and his friends free them. But their boat is taken underwater by a maelstrom. They find themselves inside an extraterrestrial facility that is draining the ocean of all its water, in a submarine ship. The cosmonauts and the team offer one of their mineral samples to the aliens, an elephant and his superior, masters of a hungry pet. The mission is finished and the planet is saved as the heroes resurface to the ocean.

=== Note ===
A mid-credit scene shows the elephant spreading flowers on the screen.

== Voice cast ==
Character	Russian Actor	English Actor
Belka	Yulia Peresild	Maria Antonieta Monge
Strelka	Irina Pegova	Mauriett Chayeb
Venya (Lenny) (rat)	Yevgeny Mironov	Alexander Machado
Uncle Yasha (seal)	Sergey Burunov	Jinon Deeb
Elephant	Sergey Shnurov	Oscar Cheda

== Production ==
=== Development ===
Space Dogs franchise started in 2010 with its release of Star Dogs: Belka and Strelka and internationally as Space Dogs. The series has since inspired a TV series Belka and Strelka: Mischievous Little Family in 2011 and a 2014 sequel. The series' original film holds the distinction as Russia's first domestic 3D film.

Director Inna Evlannikova who previously directed for such films as Space Dogs and Harvie and the Magic Museum, resumed the story of the famous animal characters, Belka and Strelka. In this new feature film, the creators of the films added new settings such as the ocean floor near Cuba and outer space. The animators took special note for their drawings of the settings. They intended the images to have a picturesque quality. The creators of the film remarked by the third part of the series, the characters are well defined. A new plot line that was added to the film is how the dog astronauts will now explore the ocean underwater seabed. Numerous escapism episodes in the film are highlighted set in the Hurricane Alley region of the Caribbean Sea. The scriptwriters intended the film not only to be a festive animated film, but they also added educational components such as the theme of ecology and how important it is to maintain balance in nature. The script used the plot of a mysterious water phenomena to highlight the importance of preserving natural resources of water. The writers hoped by presenting an accurate depiction of the ecological world, the viewers would be able to appreciate nature.

The writers from the previous sequels rejoined. Olga Nikiforova and Viktor Strelchenko joined the script writing team. Debutant script writers Danil Trotsenko and Artem Milovanov also were present. The script was also co-authored by American screenwriter and director Mike Disa who has previous projects include Hoodwinked Too!.

The voice-over started on 20 July 2019 with a cast of popular Russian actors lending voice to the characters. The voice cast included Yulia Peresild as Belka, Irina Pegova as Strelka, Yevgeny Mironov as Venya, and Sergey Burunov as Uncle Yasha. The English cast included Maria Antonieta Monge as Belka, Mauriett Chayeb as Strelka, and Jinon Deeb as Uncle Yasha. Sergey Burunov for the role of the retired "sea wolf" Yasha had to consistently use Spanish words because the scriptwriter made Yasha suddenly into a photographer. The film was Yulia Peresild's first role in an animated film.

=== Animation ===
In the third part of the franchise, the space dogs find themselves not only in their usual locations – in space, but also under water. Most of the screen time about 45% - is occupied by underwater. Character development was refined for this film with an emphasis on friendship and working together as a team. The character Strelka is given for the first time the official status of commander.

A plethora of new character animals are presented in this film that include seal Yasha, rat Venya, cockroach Tolik, parrots-bandits, pirates-jellyfish, wise muskrat, as well as crocodiles, turtles, lizards and pelicans. The audience of the previous films have found the story line of rate Venya quite appealing. Therefore, in this film the creators refined the character almost into a main character. Yevgeny Mironov has been always a popular cast choice for Yasha.

=== Soundtrack ===
The film is noted for its musical accompaniment. Composer Ivan Uryupin who has previously worked for all the previous Space Dogs films, resumed the score for the film. An orchestral soundtrack with several songs were recorded by the host studio The First of Mosfilm. The orchestra was aided by the conductor of the Bolshoi theater, Alexey Vereshchagin. Uryupin noted that composing for an animated film is considerably different from a feature film. The former requires more expression in music and changing musical textures. One of the songs presented in the film is Song of Lagusa. A review found the song of the pirate jellyfish to be the highlight of the film.

== Release ==
=== Theatrical ===
At the 108th Russian film market, the creators of the film revealed the film will release in Russia on 30 April 2020.The film was intended as a spring festive entertainer. The film was distributed by Karoprokat in Russia. In the 2019 Marché du Film market, KinoAtis closed deals on Space Dogs: Tropical Adventure with distributors from Turkey, South Korea, Great Britain, as well as countries in Southeast Asia and the Middle East. On 30 January 2019, KinoAtis animation studio held a press tour for media representatives. Vadim Sotskov, general director and producer of KinoAtis, presented the film to the reporters.

The film was originally supposed to be a worldwide release set for 1 May 2020. However the arrival of COVID-19 changed the release date to the summer. In the CARTOON in cinema event in Russia, a footage of the film premiered.

At the MIFA International online film market held in June 2019, KinoAtis was one of the Moscow studios that presented the film to potential distributors. At the June online forum Key Buyers Event: Digital Edition, KinoAtis studio held negotiations with Epic Pictures Group for distribution across Asian countries. On 1 September 2020, a video of Belka and Strelka following the recommendation guidelines of Rospotrebnadzor was released by ProfiCinema. The campaign was part of the Lets Go the to Movies (#идемвкино) event organized by the Film Foundation to restart the Russian film industry after months of quarantine.

The final release was scheduled for 24 September 2020. The film received support from the Film Foundation. On 11 September 2020, Belka and Strelka officially became the first animated film to release in Russia after the quarantine. The film premiered in an online version at the international multimedia press center of MIA "Rossiya Segodnya." The film later had a wide release in Russia on 24 September 2020. Despite the film's postponement due to COVID-19, the film coincidentally managed to release just one month after the 60th anniversary of the historic flight into space by the famous Soviet dogs Belka and Strelka.

Internationally, the film is picked up by UK distributor Signature Entertainment. The film released in UK on 11 December 2020. The film was able to register in over 124 UK theaters. Irish Film Classification Office certified the film for Ireland film theaters. At the 9 November 2020 AFM Digital Edition, Epic Pictures Group agreed for the film's distribution to North America on 2 April 2021. The film arrived in select theaters. The film will go by the North American title Space Dogs: Tropical Adventure. The film became one of the major releases in April 2021. On 6 April 2021 the film became available in VOD format. The film was screened in Kaluzhan Russia, on 15 April 2021 as a commemoration of the start of international festival of films and programs about space. On 20 April 2021, the film was available in DVD and Blu-ray.

== Reception ==
=== Critical response ===
A review from Kino Mail, believed the film captured the true essence of an alternative USSR universe in animation format: "A lot of incredible events and plot twists fall on the viewer with stunning speed. At the same time — which is a rarity these days — the creators of the tape manage to preserve the logic and coherence of their unusual world-an alternative cartoon USSR, where charming cosmonaut dogs have become real superheroes." Kinoafisha, remarked the film explored the theme of misunderstanding and the problems that can be caused by poor communication. Overall the film is an entertainer for the children audience and summarized the film as, "Russian "Star Trek" for the little ones."

UK reviews had generally positive outlook to the story. The Upcoming from UK reviewed the film is a perfect film for dog owners remarking, the film is "beautiful, evoking a sense of magic and adventure that only this genre of cinema can create. The digitally-rendered Belka and Strelka look eerily similar to the real Soviet space pups whilst being loveable and strong personas in their own right. Supporting characters come in every shape, size and colour and so much of the feature's humour come from the rich variety of animals in its lively world." The Review Avenue, found the film has "an impressive array of animals" primarily intended to entertain the young audience. In terms of animation the review summarized, "Its animation is competent, bursting with colour and additional detail in its character designs. The titular dogs look more like their real-world counterparts than ever before, with extra attention seemingly given to their hair and fur compared to others on screen."

LondonNet review explains, "Space Dogs: Return To Earth idles into first gear with an opening set-piece involving intergalactic ice monsters and maintains the same pace as events unfold above and below the waves. Some of the vocal performances merge in pitch and tone though thankfully, Evlannikova's picture is light on meaningful dialogue so there's never any danger of a key plot point being waylaid." Movie Reviews 101 stated, "This is one movie that will play into the family audience with ease, you will get some laughs, deal with the teamwork, as both Belka and Strelka will both have weaknesses the other will cover up and help them through." However the review at The Guardian had a mixed review stating the film's "humour necessary to hook in a parent audience doesn't land."

In the United States, the film received mixed to positive reviews. Sun ThisWeek from Dakota County Tribune noted the film is "Inna Evlannikova's colorful, family-friendly, action-packed, intermittently funny, 80-minute, 2020 animated musical, which is final film in the trilogy." Steve Kopian for Unseen Films reviewed the film like its predecessors have "great set pieces and some funny lines." The review noted the film might not be placed at highest level of animation, it is ideal for the family which if it were their first time viewing the Space Dogs series will likely "want to go visit the earlier adventures." Family review aggregators Dove and Family Choice Awards noted the film is targeted to the children audience. Dove especially noted it is a landmark film about the vital message of "the importance of teamwork." Lenny the rat became a memorable character for the film as noted by the review: "who has one white tooth and one yellow one. He also has a seal for an uncle." The film shows the main heroes Belka and Strelka "[having] to work together" with the side characters such as Hatchling, Lenny, Maria, jellyfish, parrots that reinforce the film's main theme of teamwork.

=== Accolades ===
Award	Date of ceremony	Category	Recipient(s) and nominee(s)	Result
International Film Festival for Children and Youth (Krasnoyarsk)	19 November 2020	Full-Length Animated Film	Inna Evlannikova	Nominated
Golden Eagle Award	22 January 2021	Best Animated Film	Inna Evlannikova	Nominated
Suzdalfest	17 March 2021	Full-Length Animated Film	Inna Evlannikova	Nominated

=== Adaptations ===
From street dogs, the famous dogs Belka and Strelka have captured the public imagination ever since their space exploration in 1960. The release date for Space Dogs: Tropical Adventure in Russia coincided just 1 month after the 60th anniversary of the historic flight into space by the famous Soviet dogs Belka and Strelka. The original film Space Dogs was released ten years ago in recognition of the 50th anniversary of this event.

The Belka and Strelka Space Dogs franchise has seen supported not only locally but also internationally. The film is noted for its international distribution. In the United States, in several planetariums and science museums, Space Dogs is frequently presented as a reading supplement to the educational program in recognition of space frontier's first explorers.

In ten years the series has three full-length films, with the film Space Dogs: Return to Earth marking the establishment of a Space Dogs trilogy. The series has also featured two animated series, a musical, books, computer and board games. Space Dogs Family TV series is currently in production for Season 3. On the streets of some cities there are road signs with the image of heroes. The first film was shown in 160 countries and translated into 45 languages. The film series has also been nominated for film awards including the Multimir animation award.

== See also ==
- History of Russian animation
- List of animated feature films of 2020
- Space Dogs (2010)
