= Chakor Buli Chavar Castle =

Castle in Ilam Province, Iran

Chakor Buli Chavar castle
- قلعه چکر بولی چوار

General information
- Type: Castle
- Location: Ilam County, Iran

Chakor Buli Chavar castle (Persian: قلعه چکر بولی چوار) is a historical castle located in Ilam County in Ilam Province.
