= Chakora, Pakistan =

Chakora
- Location within Pakistan
- Coordinates: 32.47°N 72.43°E
- Country: Pakistan
- Province: Punjab
- Elevation: 642 m (2,106 ft)
- Time zone: UTC+5 (PST)

Chakora is a village in the Punjab province of Pakistan. It is located at 32°47'0N 72°43'0E with an altitude of 642 metres (2109 feet).
