= Tyaya =

Tyaya Тыайа
- Selo
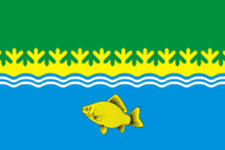
- Flag
- Interactive map of Tyaya
- Location of Tyaya Tyaya (Sakha Republic)
- Coordinates: 63°41′17″N 125°57′47″E
- Country: Russia
- Federal subject: Sakha Republic
- Administrative district: Kobyaysky District
- Rural okrugSelsoviet: Tyayinsky Rural Okrug
- Founded: 1933

Population (2010 Census)
  - Total: 477
  - Estimate (2021): 454 (−4.8%)

Administrative status
  - Capital of: Tyayinsky Rural Okrug

Municipal status
  - Municipal district: Kobyaysky Municipal District
  - Rural settlement: Tyayinsky Rural Settlement
  - Capital of: Tyayinsky Rural Settlement
- Time zone: UTC+
- Postal code: 678311
- OKTMO ID: 98624455101

Tyaya (Russian: Тыайа; Yakut: Тыайа, Tıaya) is a rural locality (a selo), the only inhabited locality, and the administrative center of Tyayinsky Rural Okrug of Kobyaysky District in the Sakha Republic, Russia, located 155 kilometers (96 mi) from Sangar, the administrative center of the district. Its population as of the 2010 Census was 477, down from 489 recorded during the 2002 Census.
