= Lullabies of the World =

Russian animated project

Lullabies of the World (Russian: Колыбе́льные ми́ра; tr.:Kolubelnyye mira) is a Russian animation anthology project that begun in 2005, with goal to create animated music videos to musical performances of lullabies (in their original languages) from countries around the world. Author of idea and producer: Arsen Gottlieb. Director: Yelizaveta Skvotsova.

60 lullabies are currently completed. The project has received high critical praise within Russia and won a number of awards at international film festivals.

== List of lullabies ==
Lullaby	Performs a song	Artist	Plot
Chukchi	Ensemble " Vaeg girls"	Yelizaveta Skvotsova	The film is about what to do to calm the child.
Russian	Arina Fridlyanskaya	Gleb Korzhov	Falling asleep, the girl watches who is doing what. Maybe she's already dreaming.
Jewish	Efim Chorny	Yelizaveta Skvotsova	A little boy dreams of becoming a bird.
Japanese	Michiya Mihashi	Natalia Romanenko	The constellations Weaver Girl and Cowherd meet in the sky once a year. If there is a thunderstorm that night, they have to wait for the next year.
Hungarian	Marta Sebestyen	Anna Samoilovich	Traveling artists show a Christmas performance.
Moldovan	Maria Ilicy	Yelizaveta Skvotsova	How nice, baby, that you are still so small!
Azerbaijani	Shovkat Alakbarova	Gleb Korzhov	The child saw his whole life in a dream.
German	Marlene Dietrich	Anna Samoilovich	A mother cradles her baby, and a baby cradles her bear.
Ukrainian	Nina Matvienko	Veronika Fedorova	Night and Winter lulls babies, so they dreamed happy dreams.

== Awards ==
- 2006—Malescorto International Short Film Festival: "Best Non Live Action Film"
- 2006—Window to Europe: "Grand Prix" in the Animation Competition
- 2006—11th International "Golden Fish" Festival of Children's Animation: "Special Prize"
- 2006—Stalker Film Festival: "UNICEF Prize for Reflecting the Theme of Children's Rights in Cinematography"
- 2007—White Elephant National Award of Film Critics and Reviewers: "Best Animated Project of 2006"
- 2007—XIV KROK International Animated Films Festival: Karelian Lullaby, Special Diploma for "Elegance of the Lullaby Design"
- 2008—13th Open Russian Festival of Animated Film: "Best Series"

== See also ==
- History of Russian animation
