= Chukar Cherries =

American food company

- Logo
- Headquarters: Prosser, Washington
- Products: Chocolate covered cherries and nuts
- Website: chukar.com

Chukar Cherries is a food company based in Benton County, Washington. Most known for its chocolate-covered fruits, the business sells approximately 140 different products such as baked goods and mixed nuts. Chukar Cherries operates two retail outlets as of 2017, including one at Pike Place Market and another in Prosser, Washington. Pam Montgomery founded the company.

The company's logo is a depiction of a Chukar partridge, said by the company to "inhabit the lands of the Intermountain West." The birds are hunted in the vicinity of the Snake River in Eastern Washington, where Benton County lies.

In 2021, Chukar Cherries was banned by Amazon without an explanation.

== Gallery ==
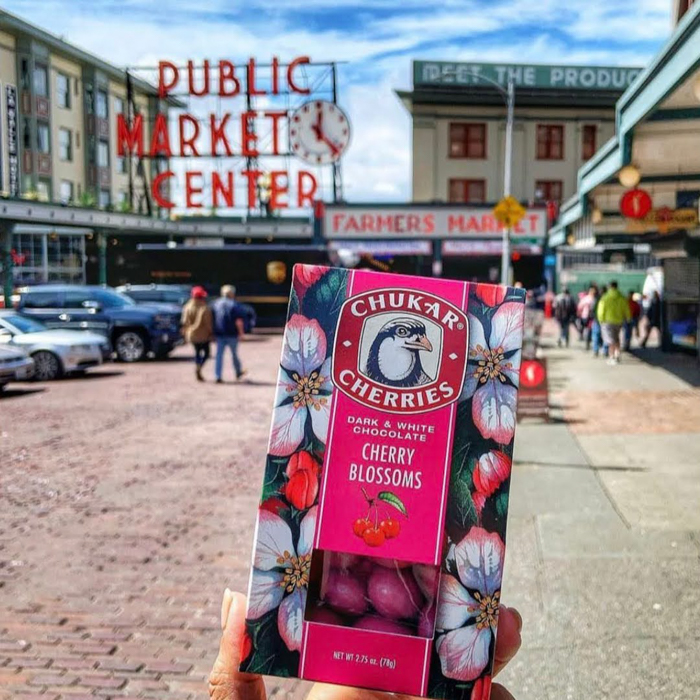
Chukar Cherries in Pike Place Market

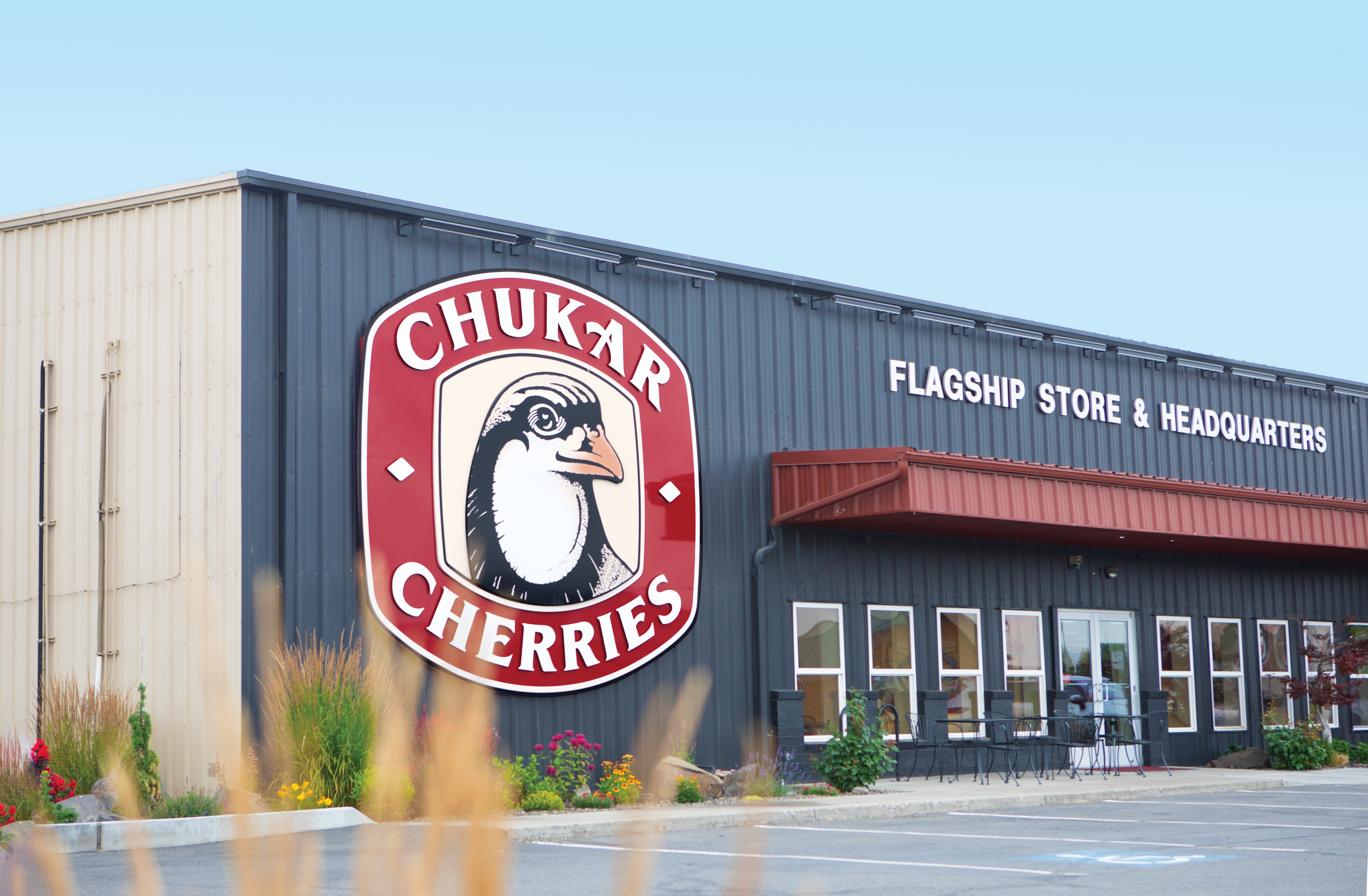
Chukar's Headquarters in Prosser, WA

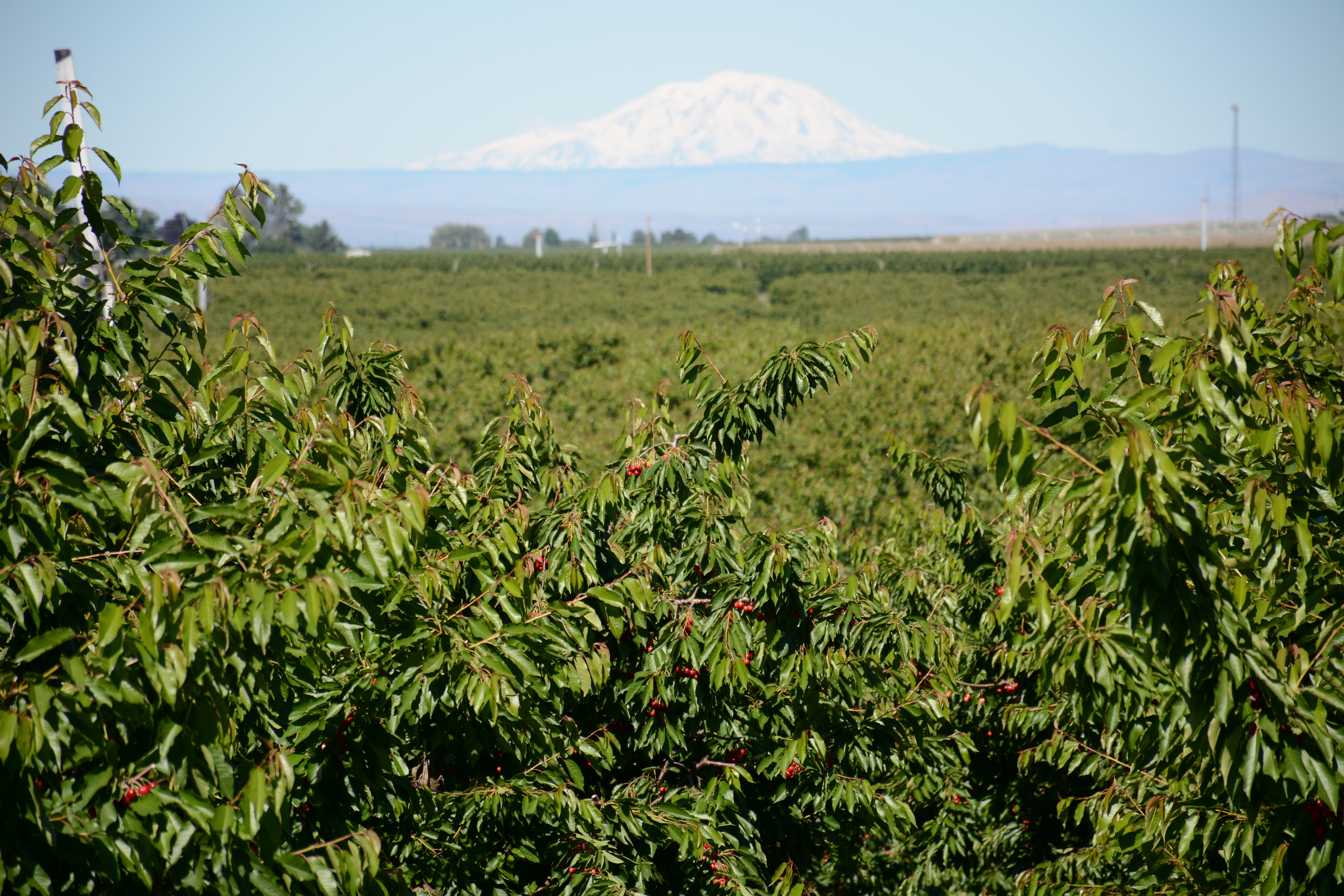
Yakima Valley Cherry Orchard

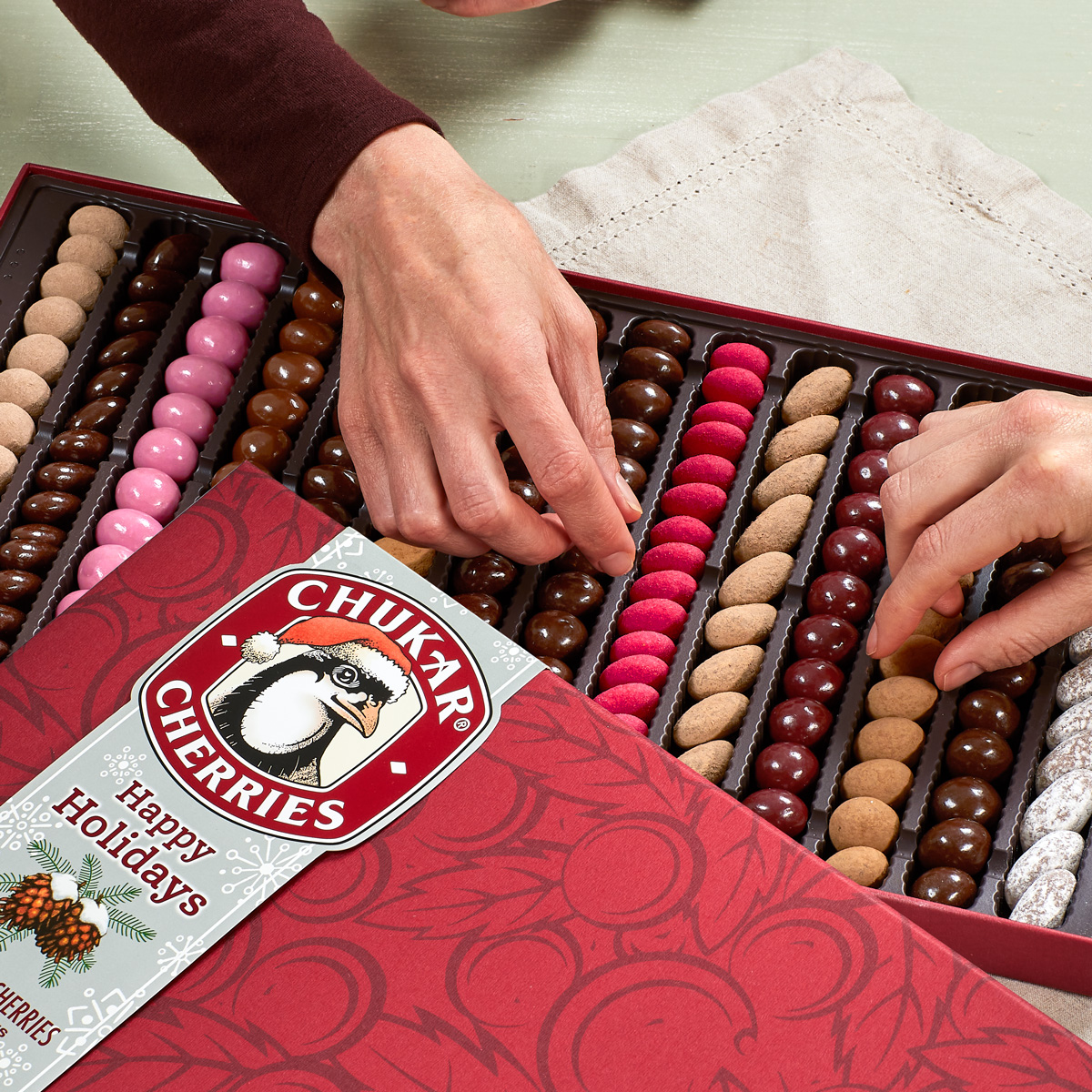
Assortment of candies

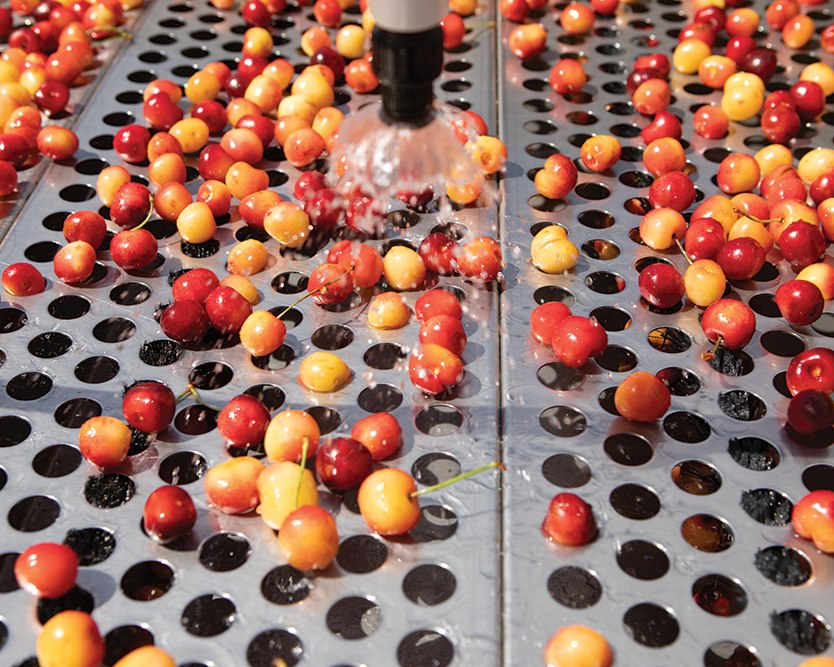
Washing fresh Ranier Cherries at Chukar Cherries headquarters
