= Space Dogs =

2010 Russian animated film

- Russian theatrical film poster
- Directed by: Inna Evlannikova; Svyatoslav Ushakov
- Written by: Alexander Talal
- Story by: John Chua
- Produced by: Vadim Sotskov; Sergei Zernov
- Starring: Elena Yakovleva; Anna Bolshova; Yevgeny Mironov; Sergey Garmash; Aleksandr Bashirov; Vladimir Dovzhik; Roman Kavashnin
- Edited by: Kirill Agafonov; Igor Chypin; Svetlana Putko
- Music by: Ivan Uryupin
- Production company: Centre of National Film
- Distributed by: Karoprokat (Russia)
- Release dates: 18 March 2010 (Russia); 2 April 2010 (United Kingdom)
- Running time: 85 minutes
- Country: Russia
- Language: Russian
- Budget: ₽ 4,000,000
- Box office: $8,314,408 (Worldwide)

Space Dogs (a.k.a. Belka & Strelka — Star Dogs, original: Белка и Стрелка. Звёздные собаки, Belka i Strelka. Zvyozdnye sobaki) is a 2010 Russian animated adventure comedy film. The film is based on the Soviet space dogs Belka and Strelka, the first animals who survived an orbital space trip, the Korabl-Sputnik 2 flight in August, 1960. In Poland it became the leader of the box-office on its first weekend, although in the United States it grossed poorly, making only $14,408 due to its limited release.

== Plot ==
A man in black is carrying a small cage from the Soviet Union to the U.S. president John F. Kennedy. In the cage is a present from Soviet premier Nikita Khrushchev to Caroline Kennedy, a stray dog named Pushok. He finds the other Kennedy pets and tells them his story.

Three years earlier, in Moscow 1960, a man showed up, who was catching dogs and taking them away. Once he tried to catch a terrier mix puppy named Strelka, but she ran away with her friend, a Lenny the rat. Then, Strelka went to dig for bones while Venya went to a pay telephone to get some money.

While Strelka was running from the strange man, Vova, a circus pig, became too large to fly in his rocket, and Belka, a Samoyed, flew in his place. Belka loses control of the rocket and flew away from the circus. After some time she crashed onto the payphone where Lenny was looking for coins. The crash broke the phone and Lenny got all the money from the broken phone. After the crash Belka, Strelka, and Lenny were met by three other stray dogs: a French Bulldog named Bula, a pug named Mula, and a wolf named Pirate. Belka and Strelka ran from the other dogs but the next morning all three of them were caught by the strange man.

After being caught the dogs are put on a train to Baikonur where they ended up at a Soviet space program training center. There they met their trainer, Kazbek the German Shepherd, who had to choose the two best dogs from the group. A month before the launch date, the chosen group was Bula and Mula, but on the final training day, Lenny came in first, with Belka and Strelka in 2nd and 3rd place. Belka and Strelka needed to fly with Lenny because he was first and the flight group was chosen.

At the end of their flight, Strelka wanted to stay in space, because her mother had said that her father, Sirius, is living among the stars. Kazbek shows up having stowed away on their flight and tried to convince Strelka to turn around. They saw a formation of objects flying towards them, believing them to be Space Dogs but they turned out to be meteorites, they got hit by a meteorite shower and the rocket caught fire from the damage. Strelka, Lenny, and Kazbek went to the back of the rocket to fight the fire with their feeding formula as water, Belka was afraid but still jumped through the fire ring into the driver's seat to turn the rocket back towards Earth. Strelka extinguished the fire, and Kazbek confessed his love for Belka. The dogs look at various constellations and Strelka salutes Sirius in lieu of her father. The dog flight crew makes it back to Earth alive.

Strelka, Belka, and Lenny receive a hero's welcome, and it is discovered that Kazbek stowed away on the flight, but the Scientist in charge of the project tells him that Soviet Propaganda won't allow the world to know that a stow-away had been on the flight.

The other Kennedy pets, led by the cat, don't believe Pushok's story, except one dog who sees the Cosmonaut Patch on Pushok's cushion. She then asks him to tell her what happened afterward. Strelka returns to live with her mother. Venya holds conferences, telling his story to any willing to listen to him. Belka returns to her circus as the main star, flying the repaired rocket from earlier in the film. Kazbek lives together with his love Belka, and everyone lived happily ever after.

During the end credits, real-life archive footage from the Soviet space program and its dogs is shown.

== Production ==
The directors Svyatoslav Ushakov and Inna Evlannikova, as specialists with foreign experience, were finally approved. Evlannikova - in the words of the executive producer, "a powerful production worker" - worked with everything that was directly related to animation. Ushakov was mainly engaged in the development of an artistic concept, storyboards, etc.

After triumphant efforts they managed to get approved funding from the Friends Learning Centre Ltd. With the main funding specifically coming from Ari and Zach Lubbe they managed to scrape together the story with the ample amount of funding and time.

To recreate Moscow in the 60s and the cosmodrome, animators studied photographs of those years and newsreels for a long time. The prototype of the circus artist Belka was the circus artist - the heroine of Lyubov Orlova from the 1936 feature film Circus. The director Svyatoslav Ushakov specially went to the Circus on Tsvetnoy Boulevard, which was the prototype of the Belka circus.

In parallel with the animators KinoAtis studio, two Indian subcontractors “Cornershop Animation and Blowfish FX, which were engaged in additional animation and rendering, worked with elaborate materials received from KinoAtis using Maya and Pixar RenderMan (produced by Pixar Animation Studios, a subsidiary of Walt Disney Studios, a division of Disney Entertainment, a segment of the Walt Disney Company).

Before the official release of the film Karoprokat looked at the International Space Station by cosmonauts Maxim Suraev and Oleg Kotov, who positively characterized it from the point of view of space specificity. Also, the first spectators were their wives and children on Earth. with some scenes of the film have been shown for some time in the program "Спокойной ночи, малыши!", Because the transmission format does not allow showing it in full. The movie was premiered on television in Russia 1 on May 2, 2011.

== Home media ==
The English dub of Space Dogs was released on DVD, Blu-ray, Blu-ray 3D & Digital Copy on 8 June 2012.

== Reception ==
Sandie Angulo Chen of Common Sense Media gave it 3 out of 5 stars.

== Soundtrack ==
Title Of Song	В Городе Дождь ("There's Rain in the City")	Watching Over You	I Got You
Written By:	Vladimir Krestovskiy	Kari Kimmel	Kari Kimmel
Performed by:	Uma2rman	Kari Kimmel	Kari Kimmel

== Sequels ==
A sequel Space Dogs: Moon Adventures was released in Russia in 2014 and it was dubbed in English and released the United States on 26 August 2016. Mike Disa was the director on the Americanized version. In 2020, the third sequel to the Space Dogs series, Space Dogs: Return to Earth released in Russia on 24 September 2020. The film marks the establishment of the Space Dogs trilogy. Despite the release date being rescheduled due to COVID-19, the release date for Belka and Strelka: Caribbean Mystery (Russian title) coincided just 1 month after the 60th anniversary of the historic flight into space by the famous Soviet dogs Belka and Strelka and was one of the first major releases of Russian cinema industry.

== See also ==
- History of Russian animation
- List of animated feature films of 2010
- Space Dogs: Return to Earth (2020)
