= Cats in the Museum =

- Directed by: Vasiliy Rovenskiy
- Written by: Elvira Bushtets; Fedor Derevyanskiy; Vasiliy Rovenskiy
- Produced by: Roman Borisevich; Maksim Rogalskiy; Vasiliy Rovenskiy
- Starring: Roman Kurtsyn; Diomid Vinogradov; Polina Gagarina; Pavel Priluchnyy
- Cinematography: Fedor Mezentsev
- Edited by: Maksim Mironenko; Eduard Nuritdinov; Vasiliy Rovenskiy
- Music by: Anton Gryzlov
- Production company: Licensing Brands
- Distributed by: Nashe Kino
- Release date: 23 March 2023 (Russia)
- Running time: 83 minutes
- Country: Russia
- Language: Russian
- Budget: ₽240 million

Cats in the Museum (Russian: Коты Эрмитажа, romanized: Koty Ermitazha, lit. 'Cats of the Hermitage') is a 2023 Russian animated comedy film directed, written, produced, and edited by Vasiliy Rovenskiy. The film follows Vincent, a ginger cat, and Maurice, a mouse, team up with other cats to protect pieces of artwork in the Hermitage Museum.

The film was released in Russia on March 23, 2023.

A sequel Cats in the Museum 2: Treasures of Egypt was released on March 26, 2026.

== Synopsis ==
A shipwreck and chance lead Vincent the cat and Maurice the mouse to the Hermitage Museum in St. Petersburg. There, Vincent meets a group of cats who protect works of art from rodents. He wants to be one of them, but Maurice is his friend.

== Cast ==
- Diomid Vinogradov as Maurice, a mouse
- Roman Kurtsyn as Vincent, a ginger cat
- Polina Gagarina as Cleopatra
- Pavel Priluchnyy as Maks

== Release ==
The film was released in Russia on March 23, 2023.

== Reception ==
In two reviews for The Guardian, Leslie Felperin gave the film three out of five stars, likening it to "a cross between James Mayhew’s Katie books, about a girl who jumps into paintings, and Russian Ark, Aleksandr Sokurov’s single-shot tour of the Hermitage" and praising the "reasonably entertaining" animated art sequences even if she complained about uneven visuals and the film barely featuring its only female character, while Wendy Ide of The Observer on the other hand gave it one star, writing "This badly dubbed and randomly plotted tale of feline heroes protecting artworks in the Hermitage is a proper dog’s dinner".
