= Ivan Maximov =

Russian artist

- Иван Максимов
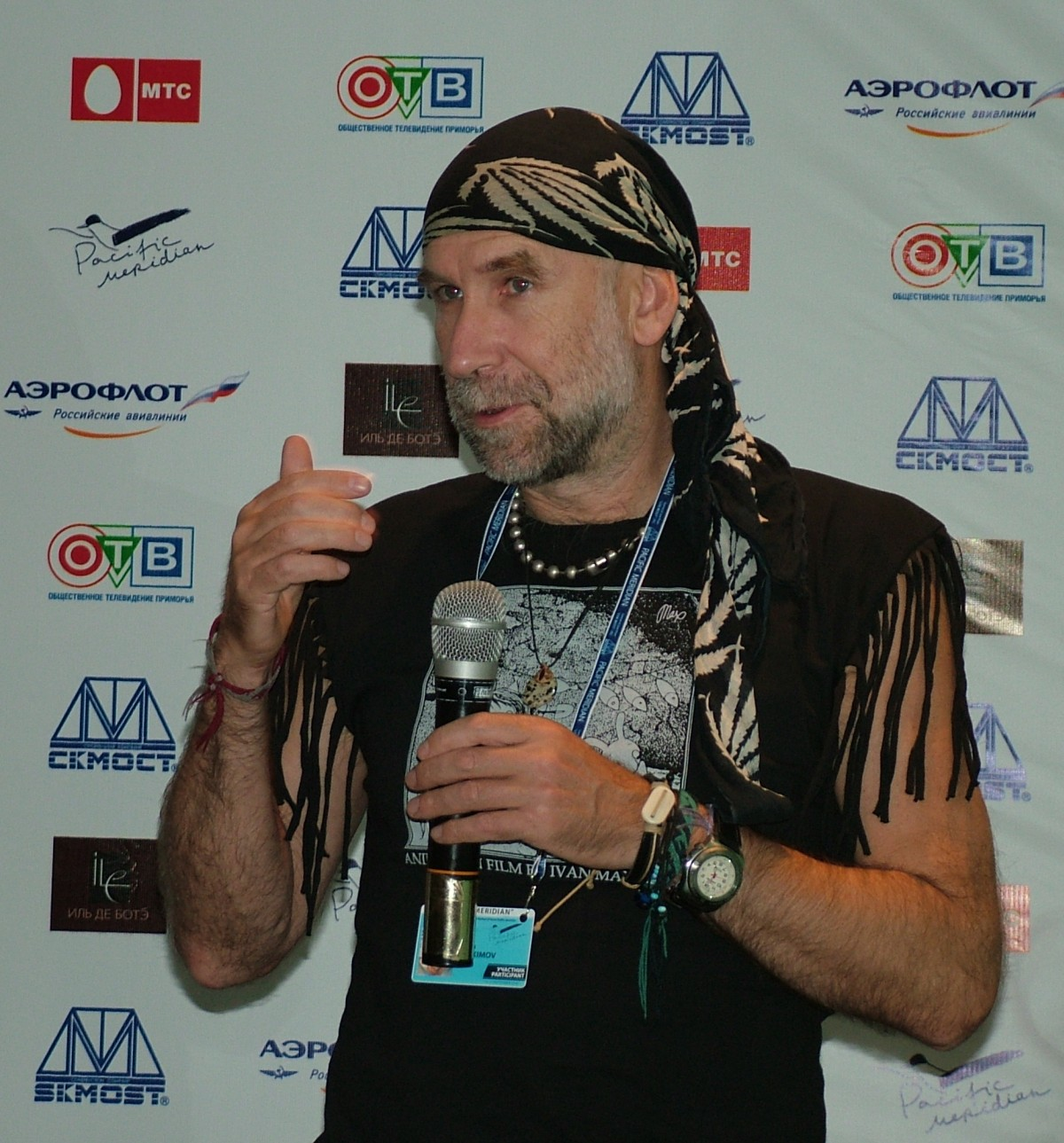
- Born: Ivan Leonidovich Maksimov; 19 November 1958 (age 67); Moscow, USSR
- Occupations: Artist; Animator; Director
- Website: http://www.ivanmaximov.ru/

Ivan Leonidovich Maximov (Russian: Иван Леонидович Максимов; born 19 November 1958) is a Russian artist, animator and film director.

== Biography ==
Ivan Maximov was born on 19 November 1958 in Moscow. He studied photography at the Biophysical Institute in Moscow till 1976. From 1976–1982 Maximov studied at the Moscow Institute of Physics and Technology in Moscow. He worked as an illustrator for various magazines and from 1982 to 1986 he was an engineer at the Russian Space Research Institute. Between 1986 and 1989 Maximov took advanced studies in Film Directing and Script writing.

In the early 1990s, Maximov became involved with Russia's first gaming magazine, Video-Ace Dendy (Russian: Видео-Асс Dendy), and the television series, Dendy: The New Reality (Russian: Денди новая реальность, romanized: Dendy Novaya Realnost, IPA: [ˈdʲenʲdʲɪ ˈnovəjə rʲɪˈalʲnəsʲtʲ]). Here he was in charge of designing Dendy the Elephant, Dendy's trademark mascot.

Starting in 1995 Maximov worked as "virtual studio IVAN MAXIMOV" where he set up his studio at home to work on film, video and computer animation. He worked as a caricaturist for VREMYA mn and in 2000 and 2001 he worked as a caricaturist for VREMYA NOVOSTEY.

In 2003, Maximov created the computer game Full Pipe at PIPE-STUDIO. The same year, he also began teaching film directing and script writing at school-studio SHAR and VGIK.

From 2002 - teacher of film directing in school-studio "SHAR"

From 2011 - teacher of animation filmdirecting in " PiterMultArt " in Saint-Petersburg

From 2011 to 2019 - artistic supervisor of animated series "Lucky!"

From 2019 - teacher of film directing in the Modern Art Institute

== Animated films ==
Most of these films can be viewed in their entirety on his official website.

- Sleva Napravo (1989, Russian: Слева направо, lit. 'From Left to Right')
- 5/4 (1990)
- Provintsialnaya Shkola (1992, Russian: Провинциальная школа, lit. 'Provincial School')
- Bolero (1992)
- N + 2 (1993, Russian: Н + 2)
- Libido Bendzhamina (1994, Russian: Либидо Бенджамина, lit. 'Libido of Benjamino')
- Niti (1996, Russian: Нити, lit. 'The Strings')
- Dva tramvaya (1997, Russian: Два трамвая, lit. 'Two Trams')
- Eta Meloch Zashchitit Oboikh (2000, Russian: Эта мелочь защитит обоих, lit. 'This Trifle Protects Both')
- Sotvoreniye Mira za 24 Sekundy (2000, Russian: Сотворение мира за 24 секунды, lit. 'Creation of the World in 24 Seconds')
- Luba (2001, Russian: Люба)
- Medlennoye Bistro (2003, Russian: Медленное бистро, lit. 'Slow Bistro')
- Veter Vdol Berega (2003, Russian: Ветер вдоль берега, lit. 'Wind Along the Coast')
- Potop (2004, Russian: Потоп, lit. 'Deluge')
- Tunnelirovaniye (2005, Russian: Туннелирование, lit. 'Tunneling')
- Dozhd Sverkhu Vniz (2007, Russian: Дождь сверху вниз, lit. 'Rain Down from Above')
- Dopolnitelnyye Vozmozhnosti Pyatachka (2008, Russian: Дополнительные возможности Пятачка, lit. 'The Additional Capabilities of the Snout')
- Prilivy Tuda-Syuda (2010, Russian: Приливы туда-сюда, lit. 'Tides To and Fro')
- Vne Igry (2012, Russian: Вне игры, lit. 'Out of Play')
- Dlinnyy Most v Nuzhnuyu Storonu (2012, Russian: Длинный мост в нужную сторону, lit. 'Long Bridge In the Right Direction')
- Doch Rybaka (2013, Russian: Дочь рыбака, lit. 'Fisherman's Daughter')
- Skameyki (2015, Russian: Скамейки, lit. 'Benches')
- Khudozhnik i Khuligany (2016, Russian: Художник и хулиганы, lit. 'The Artist and the Hooligans')
- Alternativnaya Progulka (2016, Russian: Альтернативная прогулка, lit. 'Alternative walk')
- Divergentia D (2017)
- Lonely monster goes out (2019)
- O, neet! (2021, Russian: О, неет!, lit. 'Oh no!')

== Animated computer games ==
- Full Pipe (PC, 2003)

== Awards ==
=== State and departmental awards ===
- 2012 (January 16) - Medal of the Order "For Merit to the Fatherland"
- 2013 (April 22) - Medal of the Order "For Merit to the Fatherland"

=== Prizes ===
- 1991 - Nika Award nominee for 5/4
- 1993 - Nika Award for Best Film for Bolero
- 2003 - Nika Award nominee for Slow Bistro
- 2007 - Golden Eagle nominee for Dozhd Sverkhu Vniz
- 2008 - Nika Award nominee for Dozhd Sverkhu Vniz
- 2012 - Golden Eagle nominee for Vne Igry
- 2013 - Nika Award nominee for Dlinnyy Most v Nuzhnuyu Storonu
- 2014 - Golden Eagle nominee for Dlinnyy Most v Nuzhnuyu Storonu

=== Prizes at film festivals ===
https://ivanmaximov.ru/биография/

- 1989 - "From Left To Right" [4 minutes] (part 2 of "FRU-89") student work. Awards - special prize at national festival of non-commercial films "Vita Longa" Moscow-1991
- 1990 - "5/4", diploma-film [7 minutes], Awards - Prize for the best animation film at DEBUT-festival. Moscow - 1991 Prize "KROKPRESCI" at festival "KROK" - 91 Prize "INFINITY OF COMPREHENDING OF LUMIERS" at Hanzhonkov festival of filmminiatures. Moscow - 1993 Prize FIPRESCI in Oberhausen-91, prize for best cartoons in GYOR-94, III prize of "JAZZ IMAGE" in ROMA-96.
- 1992 - "BOLERO" [5 minutes], Prize "Gold Bear" in Berlin-93. Professional prize "NIKA" (Moscow-1993)for the best animation film made in 1992 Cup of Montecatini Terme 1994
- 1994 - "LIBIDO OF BENJAMINO" [7 minutes], prize of HUMOR-Academy "GOLD OSTAP" (Snt Piterburg-1994)
- 2001 - "Luba" [4 minutes] prize for best commercial animation in KROK-2001,
- 2004 - "WIND ALONG THE COAST" [7 minutes], prize in CINANIMA (Espinho, Portugal) prize in CHANGZHOU (China) prize in Evora (Portugal) prize in Corto Imola (Italy) prize in Gold Fish (Moscow) Audience prize in Fantoche (Baden, Switzerland) prize in KROK (Ukraina) prize in Zagreb (Croatia)
- 2005 - "Tonnellage" [5 minutes] prize of AniBOOM Online Animation Competition
- 2007 - "Rain down from above" [8 minutes] prize in KROK (Ukraina) the ESPECIAL AWARD CAMPUS AQUAE of Animacam.tv
- 2010 - "Tides to and fro" [10 minutes] prize in KROK (Ukraina)
- 2011 - "Out of play" [6 minutes] prize in Varna (Bulgaria)
- 2012 - "Long bridge of desired direction" [9 minutes] prize in Varna prize in Blackrock (Irland) prize in Banja Luka (Bosnia and Herzegovina)
- 2013 - "Bum-Bum, the baby of the fisher" [8 minutes] Grand Prix at the 44th annual Tampere Film Festival
- 2014 - "Benches №0458" [7 minutes] winner in the category - short films from 1 to 10 min. IAFF Golden kuker - Sofia 2016 2nd Audience Prize in Wiesbaden - the section "Best of International Animation 2015/2016", Internationales Trickfilm-Wochenende, International Weekend of Animation.
- 2016 - "Artist and hooligans" [12 minutes] (by Ivan Maximov & Anna Romanova) Special Mention from Koji Yamamura "For the joy of freedom in play and unexpected events in free structure by the child's point of view".
- 2016 - "ALTERNATIVE WALK" has been awarded a SPECIAL MENTION IN THE CATEGORY SHORT FILM UP TO 5 MINUTES at the 41st edition of CINANIMA - International Animated Film Festival of Espinho, Portugal.
- 2019 - "Lonely monster goes out" [7 minutes] prize on 8th Athens International Digital Film Festival, prize for The BEST ADULT Film on TOFUZI 11th International Animated Film Festival (Batumi).

== See also ==
- History of Russian animation
- Melbourne International Animation Festival
