= Nyurbinsky District =

Nyurbinsky District Нюрбинский улус (Russian)
- District

Other transcription(s)
  - Yakut: Ньурба улууhа
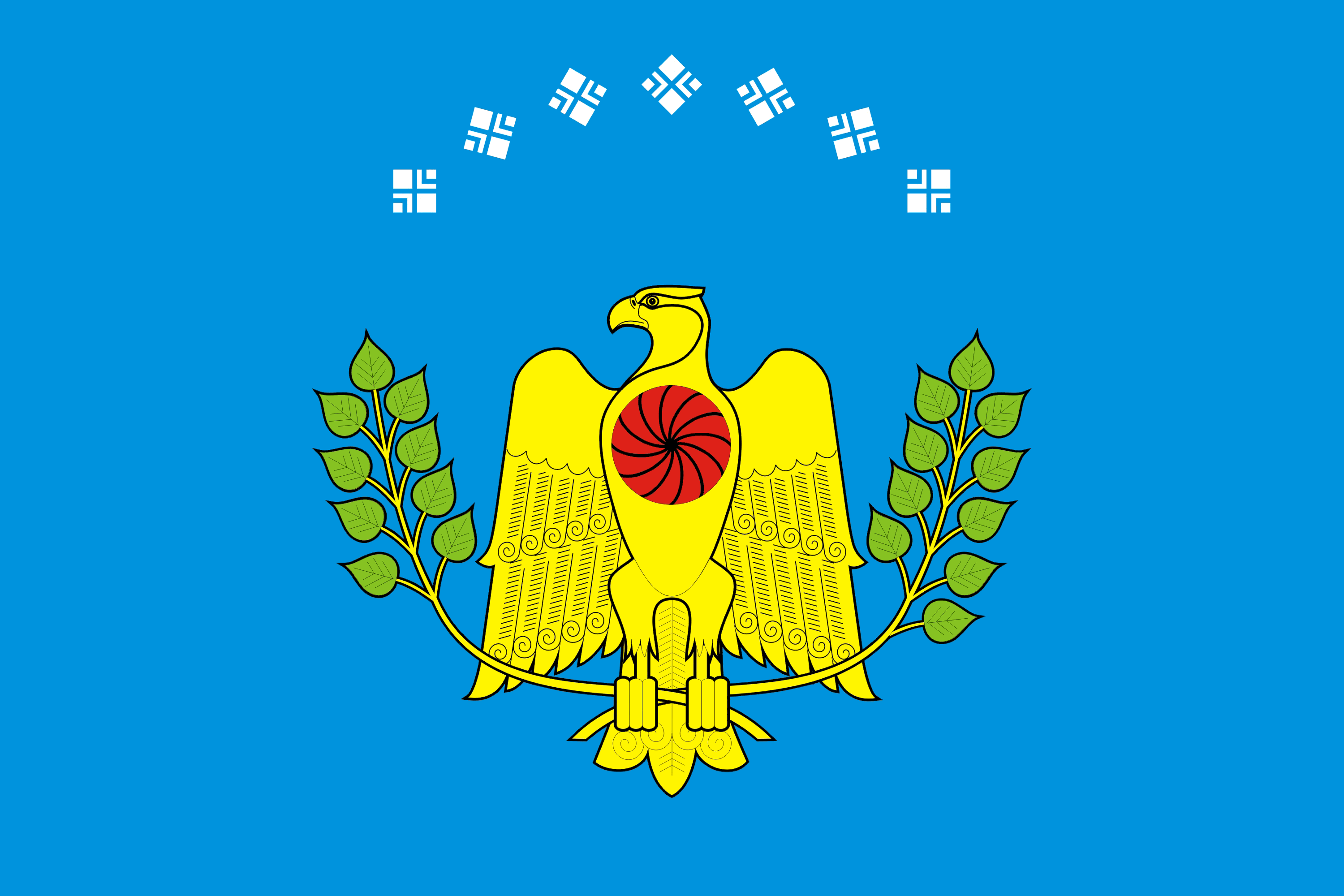
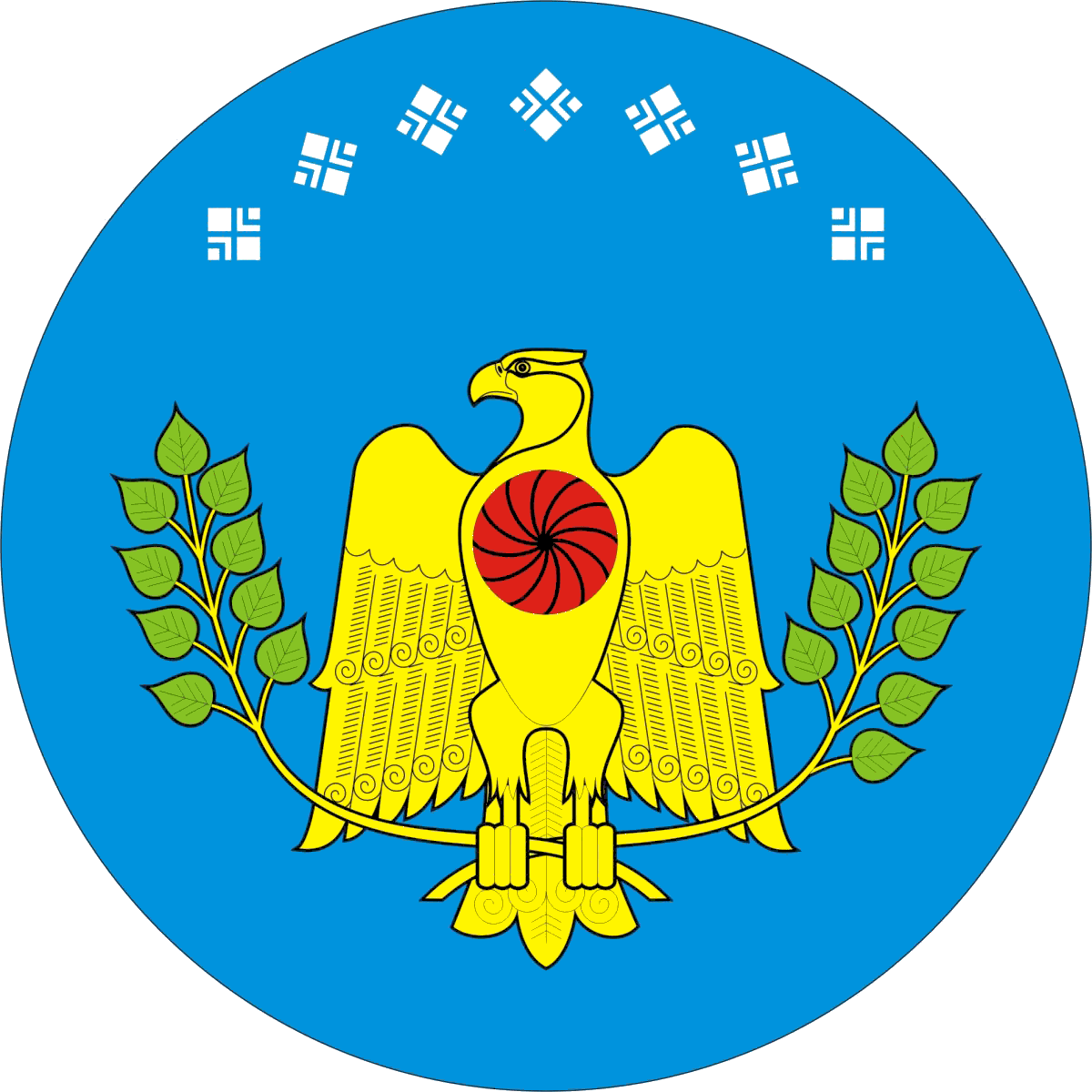
- Flag Coat of arms
- Location of Nyurbinsky District in the Sakha Republic
- Coordinates: 63°28′00″N 118°19′00″E
- Country: Russia
- Federal subject: Sakha Republic
- Established: January 9, 1930
- Administrative center: Nyurba

Area
  - Total: 52,400 km^{2} (20,200 sq mi)

Population (2010 Census)
  - Total: 15,101
  - Density: 0.288/km^{2} (0.746/sq mi)
  - Urban: 0%
  - Rural: 100%

Administrative structure
  - Administrative divisions: 18 rural okrug
  - Inhabited localities: 1 cities/towns, 23 rural localities

Municipal structure
  - Municipally incorporated as: Nyurbinsky Municipal District
  - Municipal divisions: 1 urban settlements, 18 rural settlements
- Time zone: UTC+
- OKTMO ID: 98626000
- Website: sakha.gov.ru

Nyurbinsky District (Russian: Нюрби́нский улу́с; Yakut: Ньурба улууһа, romanized: Ņurba uluuha, [ɲuɾˈba uluːha]) is an administrative and municipal district (raion, or ulus), one of the thirty-four in the Sakha Republic, Russia. It is located in the central western part of the republic and borders with Olenyoksky District in the north, Verkhnevilyuysky District in the east, Suntarsky District in the south and southwest, and with Mirninsky District in the northwest. The area of the district is 52,400 square kilometers (20,200 sq mi). Its administrative center is the town of Nyurba. Population (excluding the administrative center): 15,101 (2010 census); 15,549 (2002 Census); 28,672 (1989 Soviet census).

== Geography ==
The district stretches for 275 kilometers (171 mi) from north to south and for 187 kilometers (116 mi) from east to west. The main rivers in the district are the Vilyuy and its tributaries the Markha and the Tyukyan with the Chilli.

=== Climate ===
Average January temperature ranges from −36 to −40 °C (−33 to −40 °F) and average July temperature ranges from +16 to +17 °C (61 to 63 °F). Annual precipitation is about 200–250 millimeters (7.9–9.8 in).

== History ==
The district was established on January 9, 1930. Until February 1992, it was called Leninsky District (Ленинский район).

== Demographics ==
As of the 2021 Census, the ethnic composition was as follows:

- Yakuts: 96.4%
- Russians: 2.4%
- Evenks: 0.5%
- other ethnicities: 0.7%

Average age of the population is 29.

== Economy ==
The economy of the district is mostly based on mining, food industry, forestry, light industry, and agriculture. Major natural resources include diamonds, gold, and brown coal. Diamond mining is mostly carried out by ALROSA company.

=== Transportation ===
The Vilyuy Highway runs through the district, connecting the town of Nyurba with Yakutsk, Vilyuysk, and Mirny.

== Inhabited localities ==
Municipal composition
Towns / Cities	Population	Male	Female	Inhabited localities in jurisdiction
Nyurba Urban Settlement (Нюрба)	10,157	4,710 (46.4%)	5,447 (53.6%)	**Town of Nyurba**
Rural settlements	Population	Male	Female	Rural localities in jurisdiction*
Akaninsky Nasleg (Аканинский)	538	265 (49.3%)	273 (50.7%)	**selo of Akana**; selo of Chkalov
Bordonsky Nasleg (Бордонский)	1,918	955 (49.8%)	963 (50.2%)	**selo of Malykay**
Dikimdinsky Nasleg (Дикимдинский)	328	171 (52.1%)	157 (47.9%)	**selo of Dikimdya**
Yedeysky Nasleg (Едейский)	190	107 (56.3%)	83 (43.7%)	**selo of Yedey**
Zharkhansky Nasleg (Жарханский)	408	219 (53.7%)	189 (46.3%)	**selo of Zharkhan**
Kangalassky Nasleg (Кангаласский)	608	289 (47.5%)	319 (52.5%)	**selo of Ynakhsyt**
Kyundyadinsky Nasleg (Кюндядинский)	1,011	486 (48.1%)	525 (51.9%)	**selo of Kyundyade**; selo of Arangastakh
Malzhagarsky Nasleg (Мальжагарский)	550	282 (51.3%)	268 (48.7%)	**selo of Bysyttakh**
Markhinsky Nasleg (Мархинский)	563	272 (48.3%)	291 (51.7%)	**selo of Engolzha**
Megezheksky Nasleg (Мегежекский)	559	275 (49.2%)	284 (50.8%)	**selo of Khaty**
Nyurbachansky Nasleg (Нюрбачанский)	630	316 (50.2%)	314 (49.8%)	**selo of Nyurbachan**
Oktyabrsky Nasleg (Октябрьский)	2,770	1,331 (48.1%)	1,439 (51.9%)	**selo of Antonovka**; selo of Neftebaza
Syulinsky Nasleg (Сюлинский)	526	255 (48.5%)	271 (51.5%)	**selo of Syulya**
Tarkayinsky Nasleg (Таркайинский)	1,061	527 (49.7%)	534 (50.3%)	**selo of Khatyn-Sysy**; selo of Kirov
Tyumyuksky Nasleg (Тюмюкский)	1,034	504 (48.7%)	530 (51.3%)	**selo of Mar**
Khorulinsky Nasleg (Хорулинский)	786	413 (52.5%)	373 (47.5%)	**selo of Sayylyk**
Chappandinsky Nasleg (Чаппандинский)	880	424 (48.2%)	456 (51.8%)	**selo of Chappanda**; selo of Saltany
Chukarsky Nasleg (Чукарский)	741	384 (51.8%)	357 (48.2%)	**selo of Chukar**

Divisional source:
Population source:
*Administrative centers are shown in bold
