= Nyurba =

Nyurba Нюрба
- Town under republic jurisdiction

Other transcription(s)
  - Yakut: Ньурба
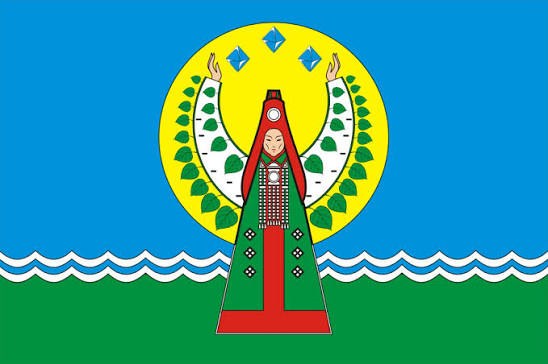
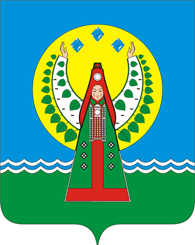
- Flag Coat of arms
- Interactive map of Nyurba
- Location of Nyurba Nyurba (Sakha Republic)
- Coordinates: 63°17′N 118°20′E
- Country: Russia
- Federal subject: Sakha Republic
- Administrative district: Nyurbinsky District
- TownSelsoviet: Nyurba
- Founded: 1930
- Town status since: 1997
- Elevation: 110 m (360 ft)

Population (2010 Census)
  - Total: 10,157
  - Estimate (2023): 10,055 (−1%)

Administrative status
  - Capital of: Nyurbinsky District, Town of Nyurba

Municipal status
  - Municipal district: Nyurbinsky Municipal District
  - Urban settlement: Nyurba Urban Settlement
  - Capital of: Nyurbinsky Municipal District, Nyurba Urban Settlement
- Time zone: UTC+
- Postal codes: 678450, 678479
- Dialing code: +7 41134
- OKTMO ID: 98626101001

Nyurba population
- 2010 Census: 10,157
- 2002 Census: 10,309
- 1989 Census: 11,934
- 1979 Census: 10,580

Nyurba (Russian: Нюрба, IPA: [nʲʊˈrba]; Yakut: Ньурба, romanized: Ņurba, [ɲuɾˈba]) is a town and the administrative center of Nyurbinsky District of the Sakha Republic, Russia, located on the Vilyuy River, a right-hand tributary of the Lena, 846 kilometers (526 mi) northwest of Yakutsk, the capital of the republic. As of the 2010 Census, its population was 10,157.

== History ==
Nyurba was founded in 1930, although the area has been settled since the mid-18th century. In the 1950s, it grew rapidly as a base for exploration of the nearby diamond deposits, and was granted urban-type settlement status in 1958. Town status was granted to it in 1997.

== Administrative and municipal status ==
Within the framework of administrative divisions, Nyurba serves as the administrative center of Nyurbinsky District. As an inhabited locality, Nyurba is classified as a town under republic jurisdiction. As an administrative division, it is incorporated within Nyurbinsky District as the Town of Nyurba. As a municipal division, the Town of Nyurba is incorporated within Nyurbinsky Municipal District as Nyurba Urban Settlement.

== Economy ==
Production of diamonds is the primary industry in the town, both as the site of a diamond cutting works operated by the state-owned ALROSA company and as its status as a supply town for nearby mining operations.

=== Transport ===
Nyurba is served by the Nyurba Airport (IATA: NYR, ICAO: UENN) and a river port.

== Climate ==
Nyurba has an extremely cold subarctic climate (Köppen climate classification: Dsc).

Climate data for Nyurba
Month	Jan	Feb	Mar	Apr	May	Jun	Jul	Aug	Sep	Oct	Nov	Dec	Year
Record high °C (°F)	−2.2 (28.0)	−1.1 (30.0)	9.5 (49.1)	18.4 (65.1)	30.0 (86.0)	35.2 (95.4)	35.1 (95.2)	34.1 (93.4)	32.8 (91.0)	16.1 (61.0)	3.9 (39.0)	−1.0 (30.2)	35.2 (95.4)
Mean daily maximum °C (°F)	−31.2 (−24.2)	−25.5 (−13.9)	−11.9 (10.6)	−0.2 (31.6)	10.6 (51.1)	20.3 (68.5)	23.3 (73.9)	19.7 (67.5)	10.5 (50.9)	−3.7 (25.3)	−21.1 (−6.0)	−29.6 (−21.3)	−3.6 (25.5)
Daily mean °C (°F)	−35.1 (−31.2)	−31.0 (−23.8)	−19.7 (−3.5)	−6.5 (20.3)	5.5 (41.9)	14.4 (57.9)	17.2 (63.0)	13.4 (56.1)	5.0 (41.0)	−7.8 (18.0)	−25.4 (−13.7)	−33.4 (−28.1)	−9.0 (15.8)
Mean daily minimum °C (°F)	−40.2 (−40.4)	−37.7 (−35.9)	−29.0 (−20.2)	−15.3 (4.5)	−1.3 (29.7)	6.6 (43.9)	9.4 (48.9)	6.1 (43.0)	−1.1 (30.0)	−13.2 (8.2)	−31.0 (−23.8)	−38.4 (−37.1)	−15.8 (3.6)
Record low °C (°F)	−61.0 (−77.8)	−58.9 (−74.0)	−50.0 (−58.0)	−42.2 (−44.0)	−18.9 (−2.0)	−6.0 (21.2)	−1.6 (29.1)	−13.8 (7.2)	−20.0 (−4.0)	−38.9 (−38.0)	−55.0 (−67.0)	−60.8 (−77.4)	−61.0 (−77.8)
Average precipitation mm (inches)	25.3 (1.00)	11.3 (0.44)	16.5 (0.65)	13.9 (0.55)	52.6 (2.07)	63.4 (2.50)	62.6 (2.46)	58.9 (2.32)	43.3 (1.70)	45.9 (1.81)	30.4 (1.20)	16.5 (0.65)	440.6 (17.35)
Average precipitation days	19.6	15.4	12.8	10.8	9.4	11.4	9.2	11.5	12.7	20.3	21.2	18.0	172.3
