= Killemtine =

River in Russia

Killemtine Киллэмтиинэ
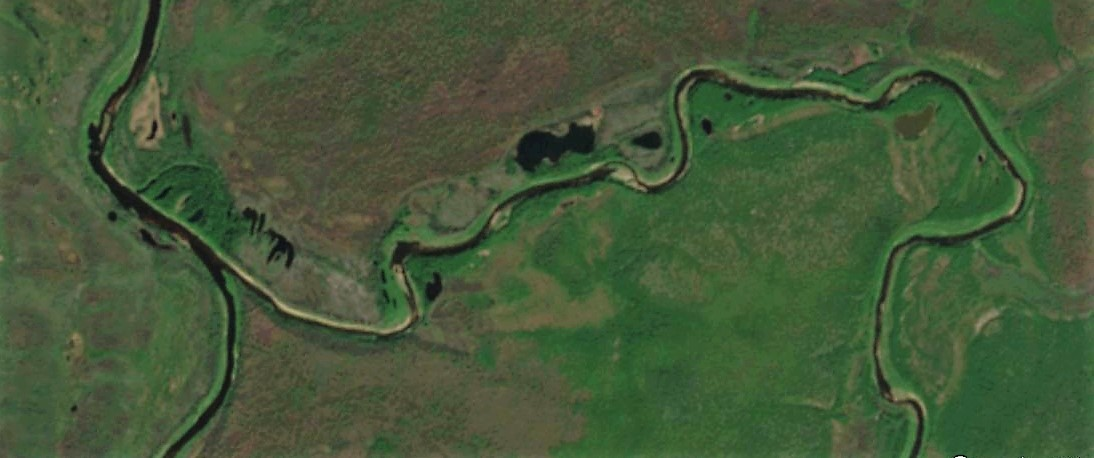
- Confluence of the Killemtine and the Vakunayka Sentinel-2 image

- Mouth location in Yakutia, Russia

Location
- Country: Mirninsky District, Yakutia

Physical characteristics
- Source
  - location: Vilyuy Plateau
  - coordinates: 60°59′19″N 110°43′18″E
- Mouth: Vakunayka
  - coordinates: 61°38′30″N 109°45′19″E
- Length: 196 km (122 mi)
- Basin size: 3,830 km^{2} (1,480 sq mi)

Basin features
- Progression: Vakunayka → Chona → Vilyuy→ Lena→ Laptev Sea

The Killemtine (Russian: Киллэмтиинэ or Гиллябкина; Yakut: Киллэмтиинэ) is a river in the Sakha Republic (Yakutia), Russian Federation. It is a right hand tributary of the Vakunayka, of the Chona basin, and is 196 kilometres (122 mi) long, with a drainage basin of 3,830 square kilometres (1,480 mi^{2}).

There are no permanent settlements by the river. The Russian Geographical Society organized an expedition in 1853–55 to survey the orography, geology and population of the Vilyuy and Chona basins.

== Course ==
The Killemtine begins in the Vilyuy Plateau. It flows first eastwards for a short stretch, then it bends and heads roughly northwards and then northwestwards meandering across the uninhabited plateau area. Finally the Killemtine bends to the west and joins the right bank of the Vakunayka 20 km (12 mi) from its mouth, right by the border between Irkutsk Oblast and Yakutia. The river is fed by snow and rain and freezes between October and late May.

The main tributary of the Killemtine is the 64 kilometres (40 mi) long Sugdyukan on the left.

== See also ==
- List of rivers of Russia
