= Alymdya =

River in Yakutia, Russia

Alymdya Алымдя / Алымдьа
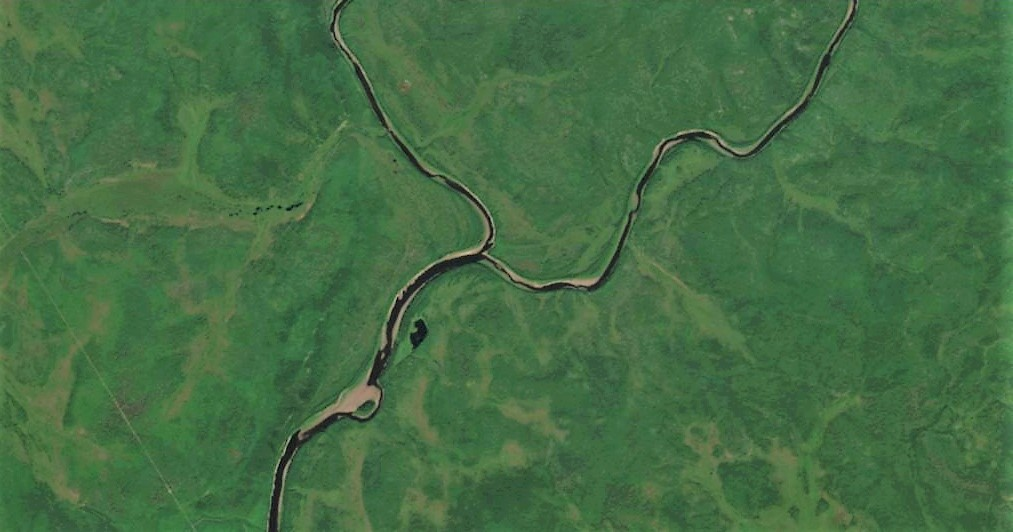
- Confluence of the Alymdya and Olguydakh Sentinel-2 image

- Mouth location in Yakutia, Russia

Location
- Federal Subject: Yakutia

Physical characteristics
- Source
  - location: Vilyuy Plateau
  - coordinates: 64°39′25″N 111°13′21″E
- Mouth: Akhtaranda
  - coordinates: 63°27′02″N 112°06′50″E
  - elevation: 250 m (820 ft)
- Length: 227 km (141 mi)
- Basin size: 5,310 km^{2} (2,050 sq mi)

Basin features
- Progression: Akhtaranda → Vilyuy→ Lena→ Laptev Sea

The Alymdya (Russian: Алымдя o Алымджа; Yakut: Алымдьа), is a river in Yakutia (Sakha Republic), Russia. It is a right hand tributary of the Akhtaranda, part of the Vilyuy basin. The river is 227 kilometres (141 mi) long and has a drainage basin of 5,310 square kilometres (2,050 mi^{2}).

The Alymdya flows across an uninhabited sector of Mirninsky District.

== Course ==
The Alymdya belongs to the upper stretch of the Vilyuy basin. It originates in the southeastern Vilyuy Plateau. The river heads roughly southeastwards and then southwards, crossing a cluster of small lakes and swamps. Then it turns southeastwards again and keeps roughly that direction until its mouth at the confluence with the 191 km (119 mi) long Olguydakh from the left to form the Akhtaranda, 75 km (47 mi) from its mouth in the Vilyuy Reservoir.

=== Tributaries ===
The main tributaries of the Alymdya are the 50 kilometres (31 mi) long Kurakkalyr (Кураккалыыр) from the right and the 66 kilometres (41 mi) long Alymdya-Tuorata (Алымдьа-Туората) from the left. The river freezes in mid October and stays under ice until the second half of May.

== See also ==
- List of rivers of Russia
