= Ulakhan-Botuobuya =

Ulakhan-Botuobuya Улахан-Ботуобуя
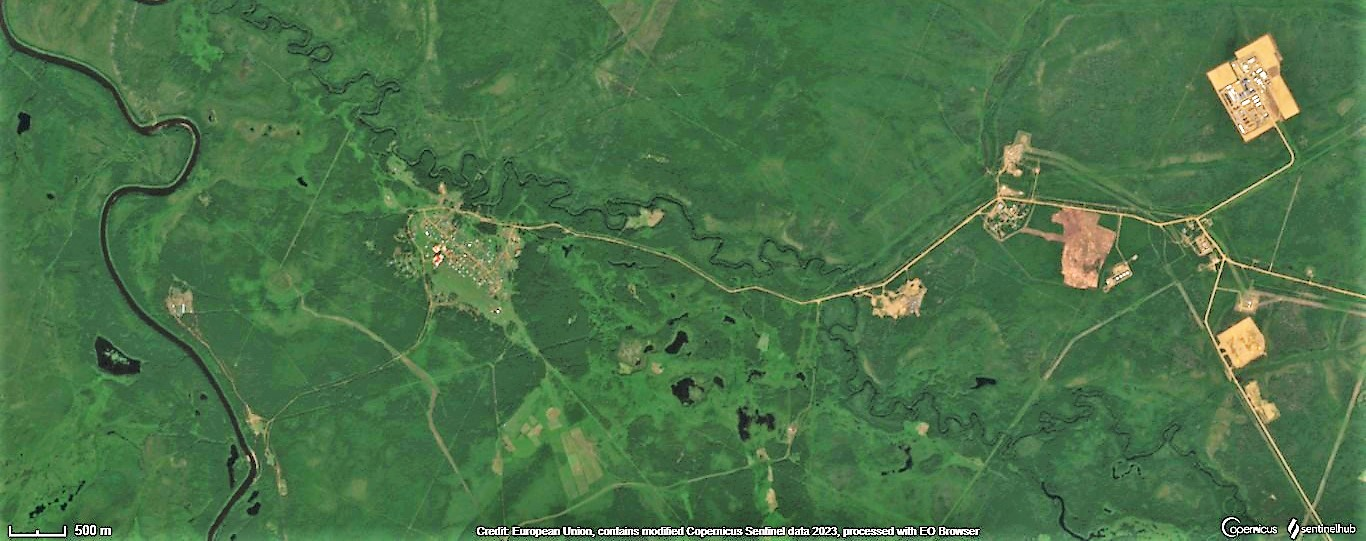
- Ulakhan-Botuobuya river and Tas-Yuryakh village Sentinel-2 image

- Mouth location in Yakutia, Russia

Location
- Country: Yakutia, Russia

Physical characteristics
- Source
  - location: Lena Plateau
  - coordinates: 61°03′40″N 111°06′03″E
  - elevation: 419 m (1,375 ft)
- Mouth: Vilyuy
  - coordinates: 62°57′11″N 112°47′12″E
  - elevation: 173 m (568 ft)
- Length: 459 km (285 mi)
- Basin size: 17,500 km^{2} (6,800 sq mi)
- Discharge
  - average: 62 m^{3}/s (2,200 cu ft/s)

Basin features
- Progression: Vilyuy→ Lena→ Laptev Sea

The Ulakhan-Botuobuya (Russian: Улахан-Ботуобуя or Большая Ботуобуя; "Big Botuobuya"; Yakut: Улахан Ботуобуйа, Ulaxan Botuobuya) is a river in Yakutia (Sakha Republic), Russia. It is a right hand tributary of the Vilyuy, with a length of 459 kilometres (285 mi) and a drainage basin area of 17,500 square kilometres (6,800 mi^{2}).

The river flows across mostly uninhabited territory of Mirninsky District. Botuobuyinsky Nasleg is located in its middle course. There is a pontoon bridge of the A331 highway stretch between Mirny and Udachny crossing the river just before its confluence with the Vilyuy.

== Course ==
The Ulakhan-Botuobuya begins in the Lena Plateau at an elevation of 317 metres (1,040 ft). It flows first roughly eastwards and then northeastwards across the Vilyuy Plateau within a wide valley. Finally it bends again and heads northwards. The smaller Ochchuguy-Botuobuya runs roughly parallel to it further to the east. Finally the Ulakhan-Botuobuya joins the right bank of the Vilyuy 1,294 kilometres (804 mi) from its mouth, a few miles downstream of the Vilyuy Dam. The river freezes between October and late May.

The largest tributary of the Ulakhan-Botuobuya is the 58 kilometres (36 mi) long Tas-Yuryakh (Таас-Юрэх) that joins it from the right.

== See also ==
- List of rivers of Russia
