= Morkoka (river) =

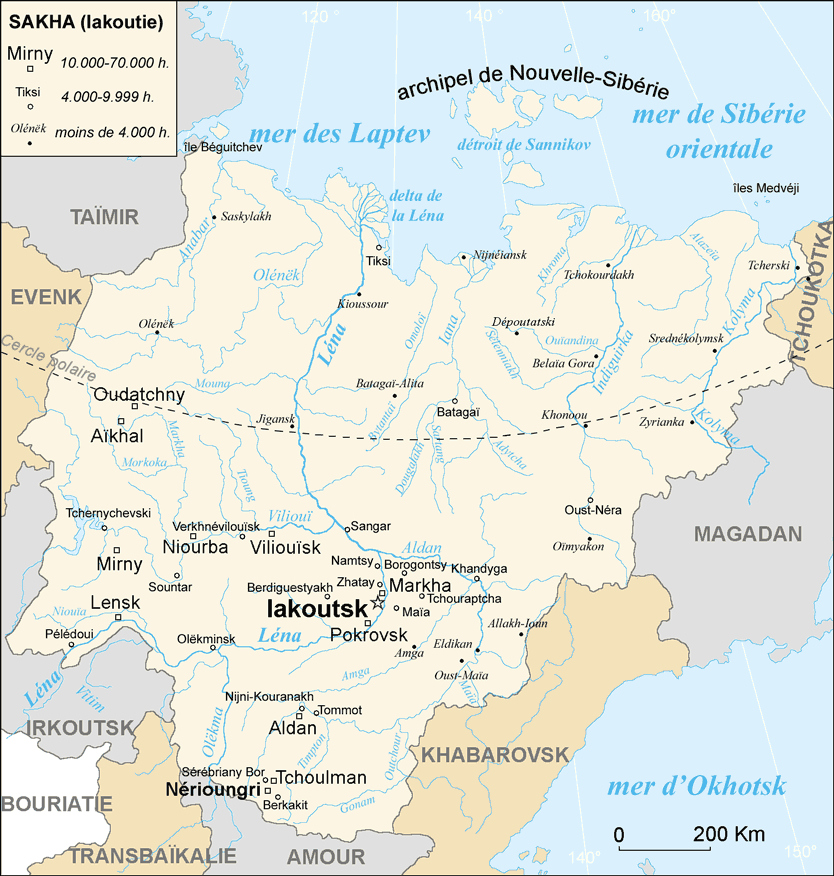

Location
- Country: Russia

Physical characteristics
- Source
  - coordinates: 66°40′27″N 108°28′52″E
- Mouth: Markha
  - coordinates: 65.1759°N 115.8563°E
- Length: 841 km (523 mi)
- Basin size: 32,400 km^{2} (12,500 sq mi)

Basin features
- Progression: Markha→ Vilyuy→ Lena→ Laptev Sea

The Morkoka (Russian: Моркока; Yakut: Моркуока, Morkuoka) is a river in Sakha Republic, Russia. It is a right tributary of the Markha. It has a length of 841 km (523 mi), and it has a basin size of 32,400 km^{2} (12,500 sq mi). The river sources from Lake Bayyttakh and travels through the Vilyuy Plateau.
