= Ulakhan-Vava =

River in Yakutia, Russia

Ulakhan-Vava Улахан-Вава
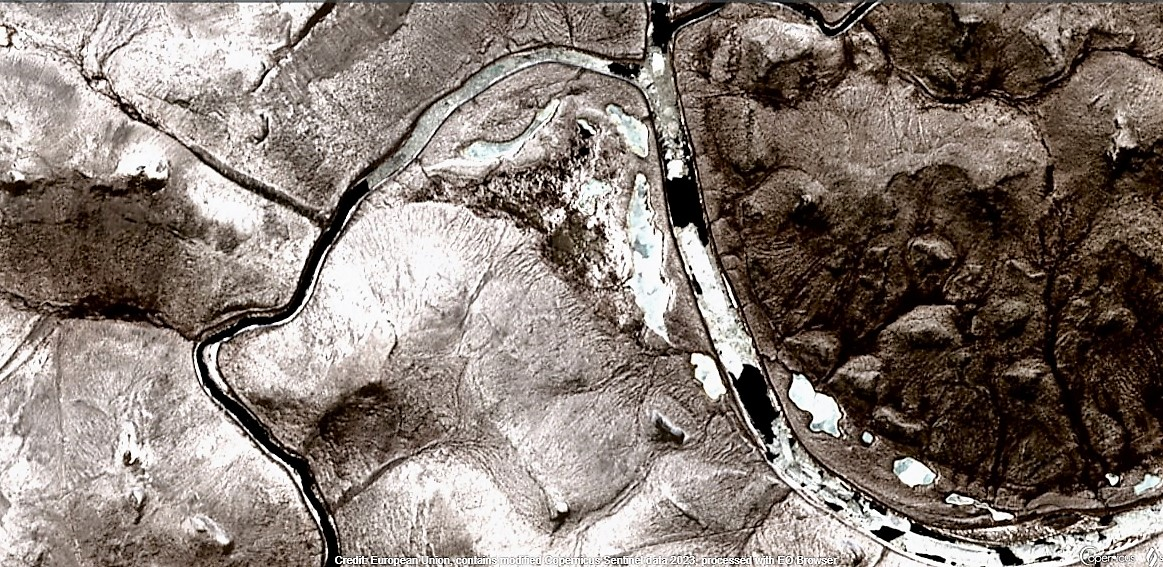
- Ulakhan-Vava confluence with the Vilyuy Sentinel-2 image

- Mouth location in Yakutia, Russia

Location
- Federal Subject: Yakutia

Physical characteristics
- Source
  - location: Vilyuy Plateau; Central Siberian Plateau
  - coordinates: 65°01′52″N 106°05′43″E
- Mouth: Vilyuy
  - coordinates: 65°02′39″N 109°13′24″E
- Length: 374 km (232 mi)
- Basin size: 12,500 km^{2} (4,800 sq mi)
- Discharge
  - average: 62 m^{3}/s (2,200 cu ft/s)

Basin features
- Progression: Vilyuy→ Lena→ Laptev Sea

The Ulakhan-Vava (Russian: Улахан-Вава; Yakut: Улахан-Вава) is a river in Yakutia (Sakha Republic), Russia. It is a left hand tributary of the Vilyuy, and is 374 kilometres (232 mi) long, with a drainage basin of 12,500 square kilometres (4,800 mi^{2}).

The river flows across Mirninsky District; there are no permanent settlements in the area. The nearest inhabited place is Ekonda, located about 80 km (50 mi) to the NNW of the river source.

== Course ==
The Ulakhan-Vava belongs to the upper section of the Vilyuy basin. Its sources are in an elevated part of the Vilyuy Plateau, near the Krasnoyarsk Krai border. It heads roughly southeastwards in its upper course and bends to the northeast in its middle reaches and heads roughly eastwards meandering in the floodplain. Finally, shortly before its mouth it bends sharply northeastwards and meets the right bank of the Vilyuy 2,043 km (1,269 mi) from its mouth in the Lena. The confluence is almost opposite the mouth of the Sen in the facing bank.

The main tributaries of the Ulakhan-Vava are the 101 kilometres (63 mi) long Khaim (Хайм), the 105 kilometres (65 mi) long Sengachanda, the 72 kilometres (45 mi) long Mayykta-Seene (Майыкта-Сээнэ) and the 194 kilometres (121 mi) long Kyuryungnekan (Кюрюнгнэкээн) from the right; and the 83 kilometres (52 mi) long Umotka and the 46 kilometres (29 mi) long Vava from the left. The river is fed by snow and rain. It freezes in October and stays under ice until early June.

== See also ==
- List of rivers of Russia
