= Olguydakh =

River in Yakutia, Russia

Olguydakh Олгуйдах / Олгуйдаах
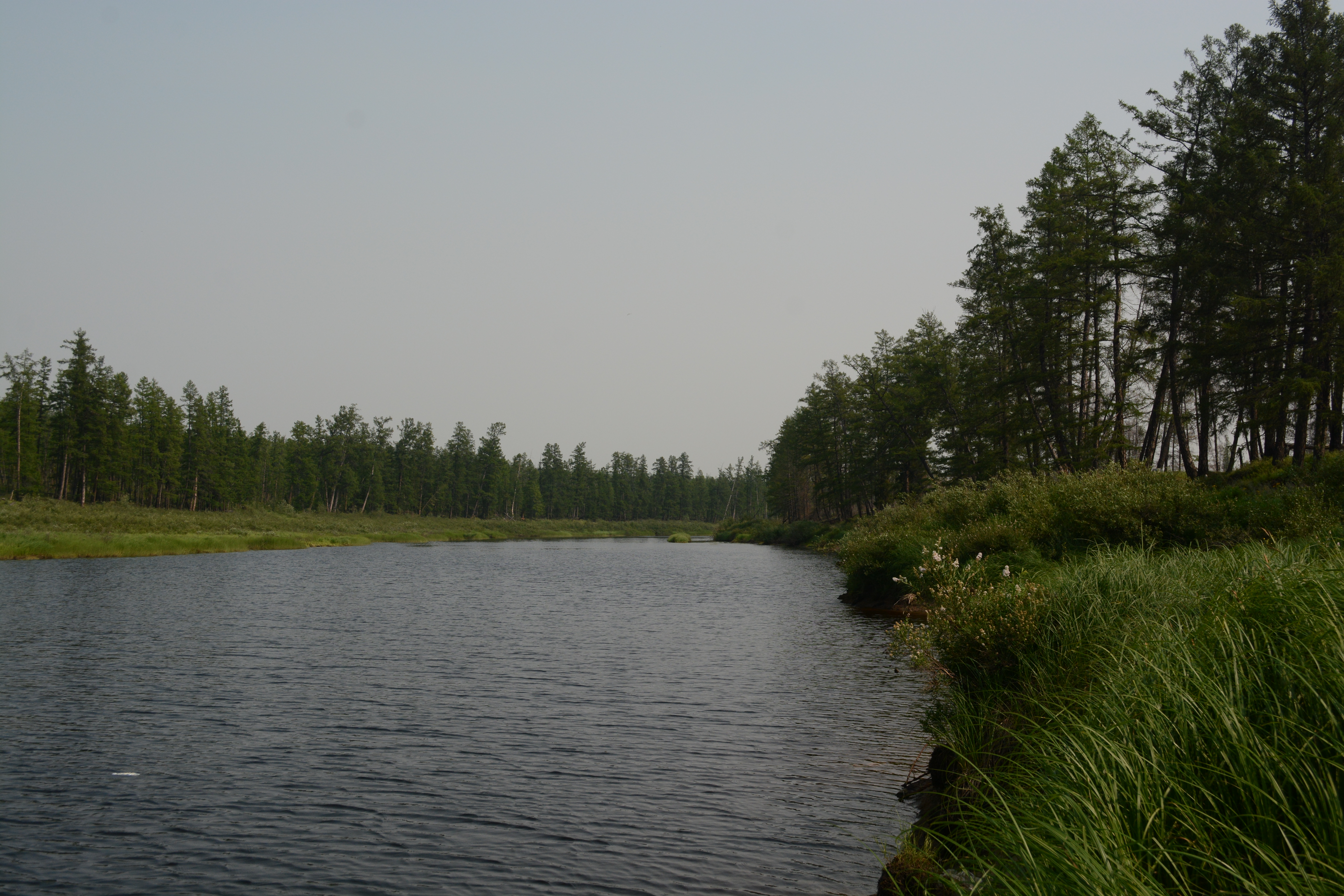
- Panorama of the river

- Mouth location in Yakutia, Russia

Location
- Federal Subject: Yakutia

Physical characteristics
- Source
  - location: Lake Toymoku; Vilyuy Plateau
  - coordinates: 64°16′22″N 112°17′37″E
  - elevation: 427 m (1,401 ft)
- Mouth: Akhtaranda
  - coordinates: 63°27′02″N 112°06′50″E
  - elevation: 250 m (820 ft)
- Length: 191 km (119 mi)
- Basin size: 5,450 km^{2} (2,100 sq mi)

Basin features
- Progression: Akhtaranda → Vilyuy→ Lena→ Laptev Sea

The Olguydakh (Russian: Олгуйдах; Yakut: Олгуйдаах), is a river in Yakutia (Sakha Republic), Russia. It is a left hand tributary of the Akhtaranda, part of the Vilyuy basin. The river is 191 kilometres (119 mi) long and has a drainage basin of 5,450 square kilometres (2,100 mi^{2}).

The river flows across an uninhabited sector of Mirninsky District. An area where mysterious events reportedly took place lies near the abandoned Olguydakh village on the banks of the lower course of the river.

== Course ==
The Olguydakh belongs to the upper stretch of the Vilyuy basin. It originates in the northeastern end of lake Toymoku (Yakut: Тоймоку) of the Vilyuy Plateau. The river heads first northwards for a short stretch, then it bends and heads roughly southeastwards and southwards, meandering slightly for the remainder of its course. There are many small lakes in its basin. In its last stretch the Olguydakh turns to the southwest. Its mouth is at the confluence with the 227 km (141 mi) long Alymdya from the right to form the Akhtaranda, 75 km (47 mi) from its mouth in the Vilyuy Reservoir. There is a bridge of the Aykhal—Chernyshevsky highway over the Olguydakh.

=== Tributaries ===
The main tributary of the Olguydakh is the 80 kilometres (50 mi) long Aallaakh (Ааллаах) from the left. The river freezes in mid October and stays under ice until mid May.

== See also ==
- List of rivers of Russia
