= Shologonsky Rural Okrug, Olenyoksky District, Sakha Republic =

Okrug in Sakha Republic, Russia

Coordinates: 66°15′N 114°17′E

Shologonsky Ethnic Rural Okrug or Shologonsky Nasleg (Russian: Шологонский национальный наслег (сельский округ)) is an administrative division of Olenyoksky District of the Sakha Republic, Russia. As a municipal division, its territory is incorporated as Shologonsky Ethnic Rural Settlement within Olenyoksky Municipal District.

== Geography ==
It is located on the Markha River downstream of Udachny. Its administrative center and the only inhabited locality is Eyik.

== Climate ==
The rural okrug has an extreme subarctic climate (Köppen climate classification Dfd). Winters are extremely cold with average temperatures from −46.0 to −36.0 °C (−50.8 to −32.8 °F) in January, while summers are mild with average temperatures from +5.9 to +21.7 °C (42.6 to 71.1 °F). Precipitation is moderate, and is significantly higher in summer than at other times of the year.

Climate data for Shologonsky Rural Okrug
Month	Jan	Feb	Mar	Apr	May	Jun	Jul	Aug	Sep	Oct	Nov	Dec	Year
Record high °C (°F)	−2.9 (26.8)	−1.1 (30.0)	6.3 (43.3)	21.7 (71.1)	29.2 (84.6)	34.1 (93.4)	36.1 (97.0)	32.8 (91.0)	27.1 (80.8)	15.0 (59.0)	4.0 (39.2)	−0.6 (30.9)	36.1 (97.0)
Mean daily maximum °C (°F)	−36.0 (−32.8)	−30.1 (−22.2)	−15.4 (4.3)	−3.6 (25.5)	6.1 (43.0)	17.3 (63.1)	21.7 (71.1)	17.6 (63.7)	8.0 (46.4)	−6.9 (19.6)	−26.0 (−14.8)	−33.5 (−28.3)	−6.7 (19.9)
Daily mean °C (°F)	−40.7 (−41.3)	−36.5 (−33.7)	−24.8 (−12.6)	−11.3 (11.7)	1.0 (33.8)	11.5 (52.7)	15.0 (59.0)	10.7 (51.3)	2.5 (36.5)	−11.8 (10.8)	−30.9 (−23.6)	−38.3 (−36.9)	−12.8 (9.0)
Mean daily minimum °C (°F)	−46.0 (−50.8)	−43.6 (−46.5)	−35.4 (−31.7)	−22.4 (−8.3)	−7.0 (19.4)	3.3 (37.9)	5.9 (42.6)	2.0 (35.6)	−4.2 (24.4)	−18.5 (−1.3)	−36.8 (−34.2)	−43.5 (−46.3)	−20.5 (−4.9)
Record low °C (°F)	−61.1 (−78.0)	−62.0 (−79.6)	−58.9 (−74.0)	−46.1 (−51.0)	−30.0 (−22.0)	−12.8 (9.0)	−5.0 (23.0)	−12.2 (10.0)	−26.0 (−14.8)	−42.2 (−44.0)	−60.0 (−76.0)	−64.8 (−84.6)	−64.8 (−84.6)
Average precipitation mm (inches)	11.1 (0.44)	12.6 (0.50)	26.7 (1.05)	23.0 (0.91)	53.2 (2.09)	78.2 (3.08)	70.5 (2.78)	57.2 (2.25)	53.6 (2.11)	45.4 (1.79)	23.6 (0.93)	12.9 (0.51)	468 (18.44)
Average precipitation days (≥ 0.1 mm)	14.7	12.2	11.9	9.2	7.5	8.7	7.5	9.1	10.7	15.5	14.7	12.3	134
Average relative humidity (%)	78.9	76.8	72.4	64.8	60.0	61.7	66.9	74.2	76.6	82.1	81.4	79.2	72.9
Mean monthly sunshine hours	9.3	98.0	223.2	267.0	269.7	276.0	297.6	186.0	117.0	62.0	33.0	0.0	1,838.8
Source: climatebase.ru
