= Suringda =

- Сурингда
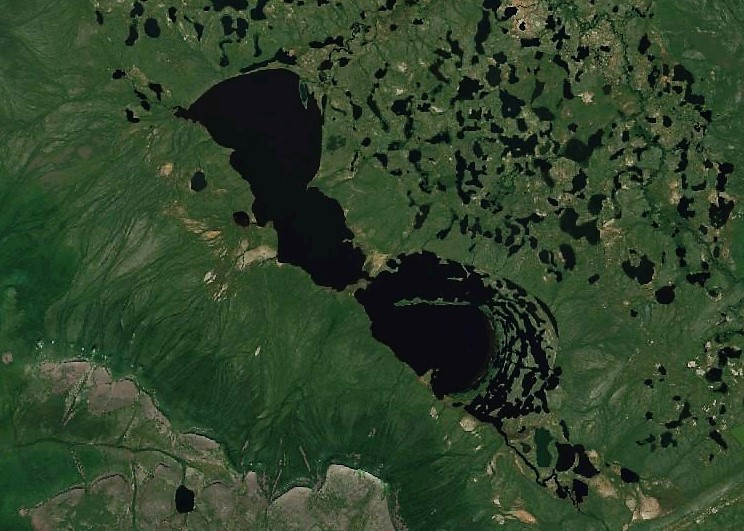
- Lake Suringda Sentinel-2 image

- Location in Krasnoyarsk Krai, Russian Federation
- Location: Vilyuy Plateau
- Coordinates: 65°30′00″N 105°05′00″E
- Type: Freshwater lake
- Primary outflows: Siringda Khon
- Catchment area: 389 km^{2} (150 sq mi)
- Basin countries: Russia
- Max. length: 14.7 km (9.1 mi)
- Max. width: 3.6 km (2.2 mi)
- Surface area: 34.2 km^{2} (13.2 sq mi)
- Surface elevation: 398 m (1,306 ft)
- Islands: yes

Suringda (Russian: Сурингда) is a large freshwater lake in Evenkiysky District, Krasnoyarsk Krai, Russia. It has an area of 34.2 km^{2} (13.2 sq mi) and a maximum depth of 6 m (20 ft).

There are no permanent settlements on the shores of lake Suringda. The nearest inhabited place is Ekonda, located 26 km (16 mi) to the NNE of the northern end of the lake.

== Geography ==
Lake Suringda belongs to the basin of the Vilyuy river and lies to the south of the upper reaches of the Vilyuy. It is the largest lake in an elevated plain of the Vilyuy Plateau, part of the Central Siberian Plateau. To the south and west rises the Ustul Suringdauren (Устул Сурингдаурен), a range of moderate altitude with a maximum height of 806 m (2,644 ft). To the north and east there is flatland dotted with numerous small lakes. The lake has a roughly hourglass shape and is oriented from NW to SE. A landspit in the middle section divides the lake into two parts. The southern part has a more indented coast and many islands.

The lake freezes between mid October and late May.

== See also ==
- List of lakes of Russia
