= Chilli (river) =

River in Yakutia, Russia

Chilli Чилли (Чилии)
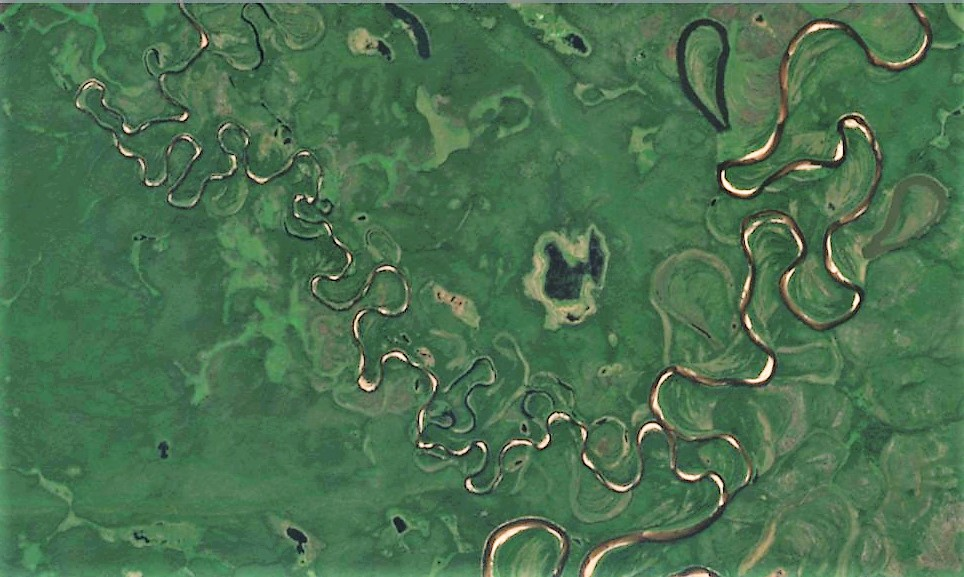
- Confluence of the Chilli and the Tyukyan Sentinel-2 image

- Mouth location in Yakutia, Russia

Location
- Country: Nyurbinsky District, Yakutia

Physical characteristics
- Source
  - location: Central Siberian Plateau
  - coordinates: 65°09′15″N 117°51′14″E
- Mouth: Tyukyan
  - coordinates: 63°43′41″N 119°34′31″E
  - elevation: 109 m (358 ft)
- Length: 349 km (217 mi)
- Basin size: 5,290 km^{2} (2,040 sq mi)
- Discharge
  - average: 6.2 m^{3}/s (220 cu ft/s) 139 km (86 mi) from the mouth

Basin features
- Progression: Tyukyan → Vilyuy→ Lena→ Laptev Sea

The Chilli (Russian: Чилли) or Chilii (Russian: Чилии) is a river in Yakutia (Sakha Republic), Russian Federation. It is a right hand tributary of the Tyukyan of the Vilyuy basin. The river is 349 kilometres (217 mi) long and has a drainage basin of 5,290 square kilometres (2,040 mi^{2}).

The Chilli flows across Nyurbinsky District; there are no permanent settlements near it.

== Course ==
The Chilli is the longest tributary of the Tyukyan. The river begins in the Central Siberian Plateau. It flows roughly southeastwards across the eastern limits of the upland, descending into the Central Yakutian Lowland. Much of its wide floodplain is marshy and the river flows slowly, forming meanders in the plain. Finally it joins the right bank of the Tyukyan 49 km (30 mi) from its mouth in the Vilyuy River.

The main tributaries of the Chilli are the 72 kilometres (45 mi) long Ikee (Икээ) on the left and the 41 kilometres (25 mi) long Iireleekh (Иирэлээх) on the right. The river is fed by snow and rain and its largest water flow is in May. It freezes between October and late May.

== See also ==
- List of rivers of Russia
