= Tyung =

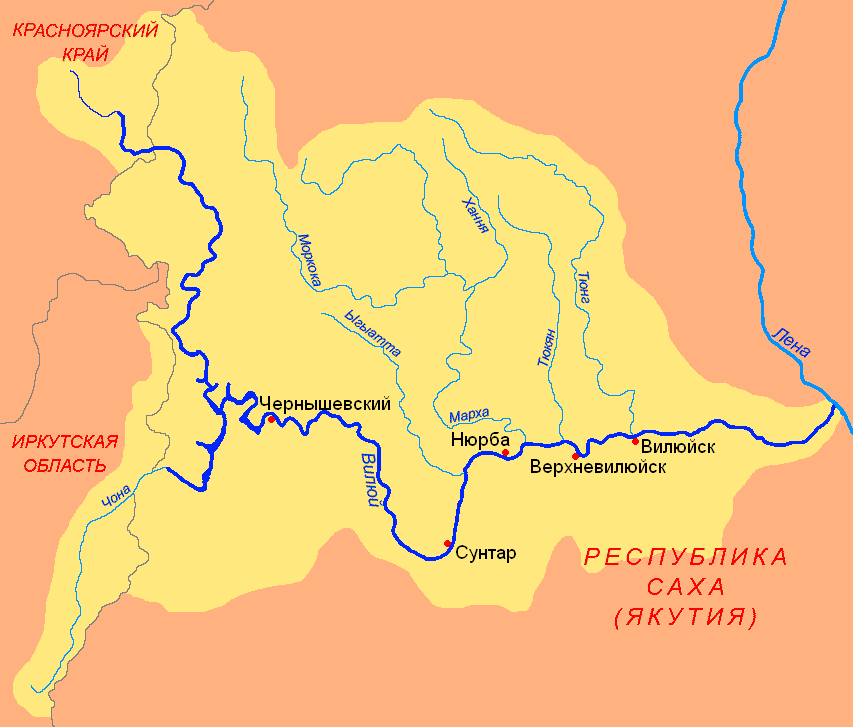
- The T-shaped Chona-Vilyuy River system.

Location
- Country: Russia

Physical characteristics
- Source
  - location: Central Siberian Plateau
- Mouth: Vilyuy
  - coordinates: 63.7703°N 121.539°E
- Length: 1,092 km (679 mi)
- Basin size: 49,800 km^{2} (19,200 sq mi)

Basin features
- Progression: Vilyuy→ Lena→ Laptev Sea

The Tyung (Russian: Тюнг; Yakut: Түҥ, Tüŋ) is a river in Yakutia, Russia. It is a left tributary of the Vilyuy in the Lena basin. The length of the river is 1,092 kilometres (679 mi). The area of its basin is 49,800 square kilometres (19,200 mi^{2}).

== Course ==
The Tyung begins in the Central Siberian Plateau. When it descends into the Central Yakutian Lowland it begins to meander strongly and flows roughly southwards until it meets the Vilyuy. The Tyukyan, also a Vilyuy tributary, has its source in a swampy area near the Tyung basin.

The Tyung freezes in October and stays icebound until the second half of May to early June.

=== Tributaries ===
Its main tributaries are the 299 km (186 mi) long Chimidikyan (Чимидикээн), the 243 km (151 mi) long Dzhippa (Дьыыппа), the 193 km (120 mi) long Arga-Tyung (Арҕаа Түҥ) and the 174 km (108 mi) long Tyungkeen (Түҥкэн).

== See also ==
- List of rivers of Russia
