= Ochchuguy-Botuobuya =

Ochchuguy-Botuobuya Оччугуй-Ботуобуя
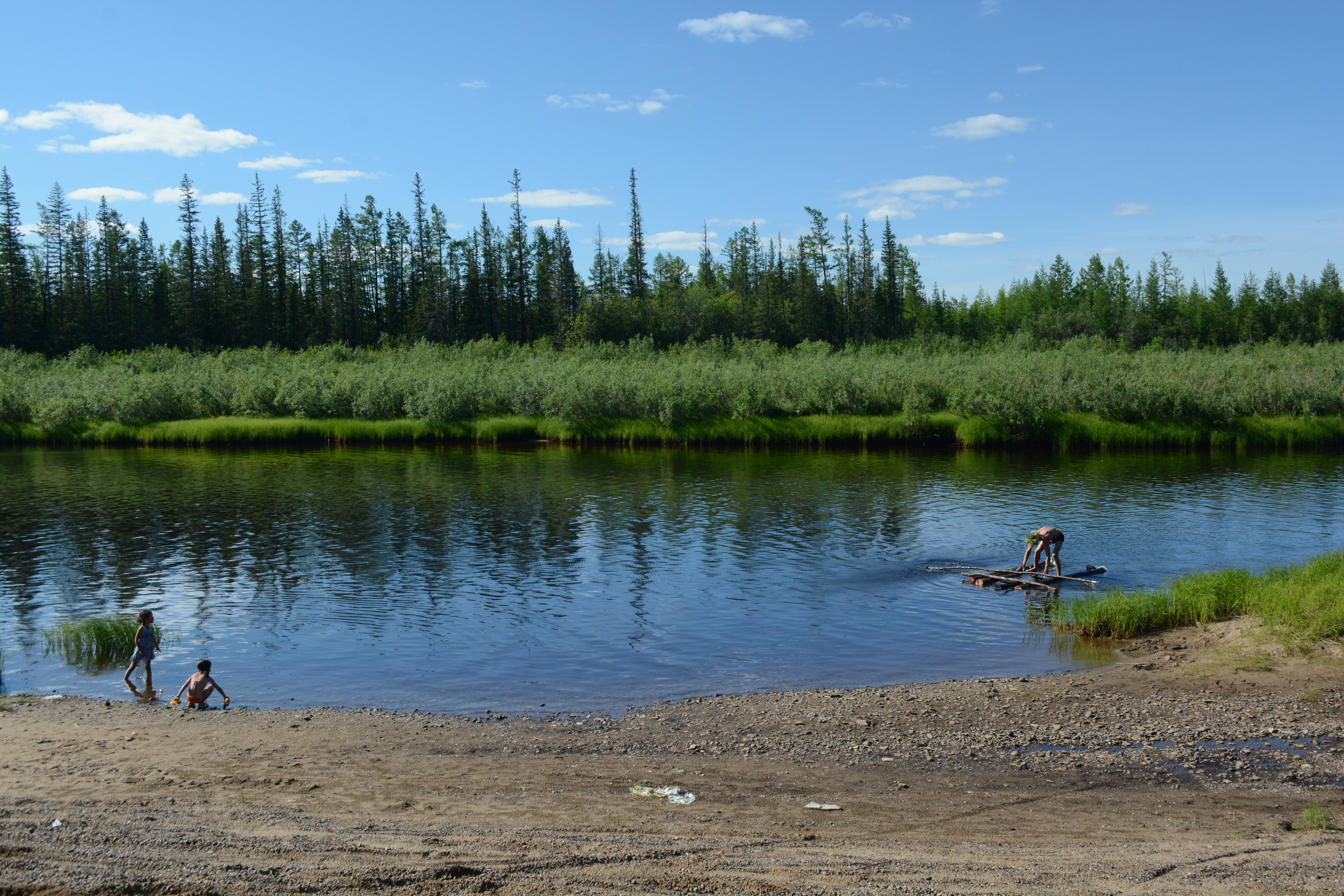
- View of the river in the summer

- Location in the Sakha Republic, Russia

Location
- Country: Yakutia, Russia

Physical characteristics
- Source
  - location: Lena Plateau
  - coordinates: 61°37′4″N 114°12′26″E
  - elevation: 317 m (1,040 ft)
- Mouth: Vilyuy
  - coordinates: 63°4′37″N 113°31′19″E
  - elevation: 158 m (518 ft)
- Length: 342 km (213 mi)
- Basin size: 11,100 km^{2} (4,300 sq mi)
- Discharge
  - average: 40 m^{3}/s (1,400 cu ft/s)

Basin features
- Progression: Vilyuy→ Lena→ Laptev Sea

The Ochchuguy-Botuobuya (Russian: Оччугуй-Ботуобуя or Малая Ботуобуя; Yakut: Оччугуй Ботуобуйа, Oççuguy Botuobuya) is a river in the Republic of Sakha in Russia. It is a right hand tributary of the Vilyuy, and is 342 kilometres (213 mi) long, with a drainage basin of 11,100 square kilometres (4,300 mi^{2}).

== Course ==
The river begins in the Lena Plateau at an elevation of 317 metres (1,040 ft). It flows roughly northwards through a wide valley with the larger Ulakhan-Botuobuya running parallel to it further to the west. Finally, it joins river Vilyuy from the right near Khampa village. The river freezes between October and late May.

The main tributaries of the Ochchuguy-Botuobuya are the Irelyakh and the Kharya Yuryakh. The town of Almazny is located at the confluence of the Ochchuguy Botuobuya and the Irelyakh.

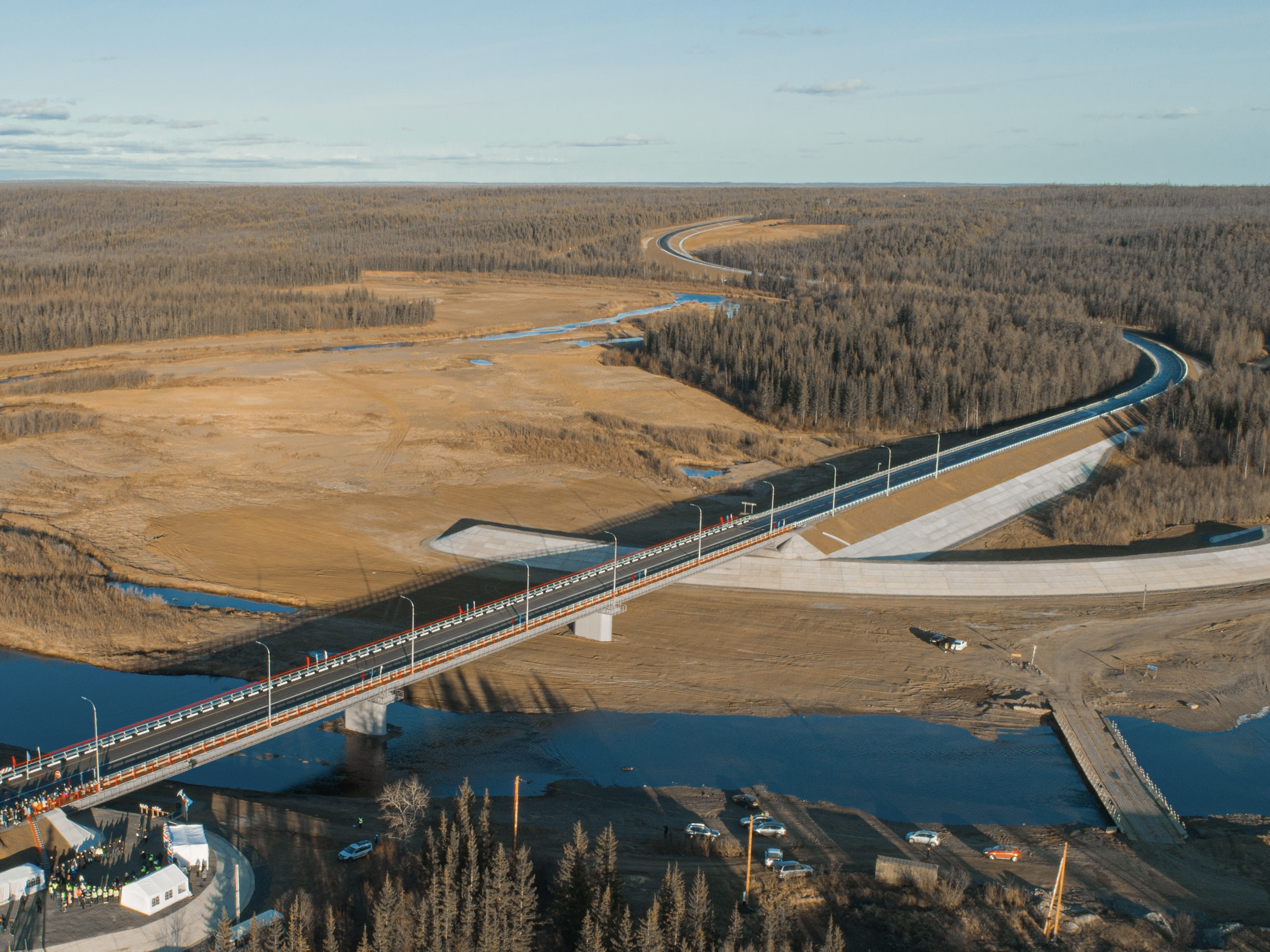
A331 highway bridge over the river.

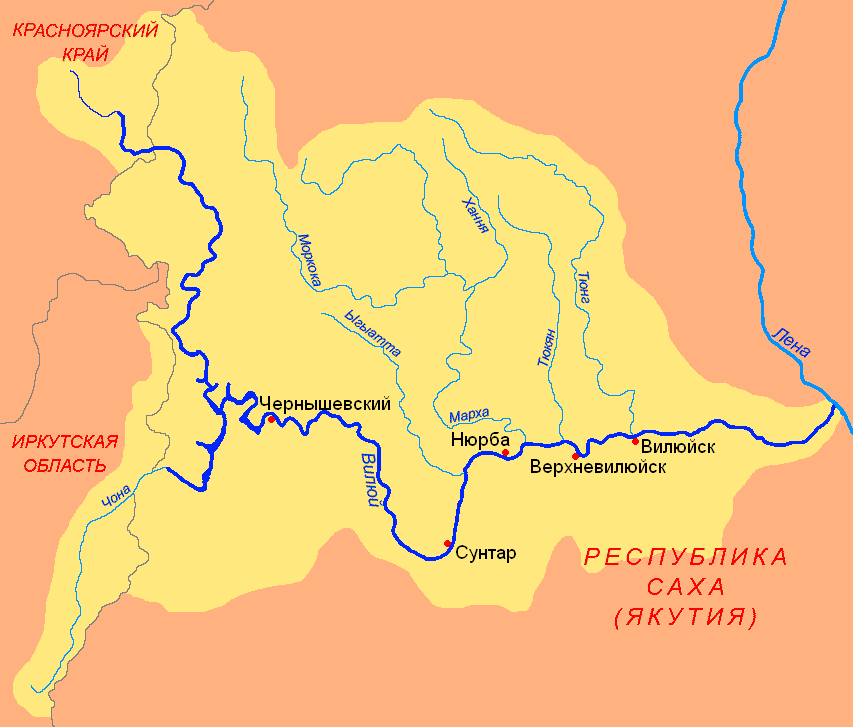
The T-shaped Chona-Vilyuy River system.

== See also ==
- List of rivers of Russia
