= Eyk =

Eyk or EYK may refer to:

- Beloyarsk Airport, in Russia
- Eat Your Kimchi, a South Korean production company
- Tonny Eyk (born 1940), Dutch composer
- Eyik (lake), in Yakutia, Russia

== See also ==
- Van Eyk
