= Ygyatta =

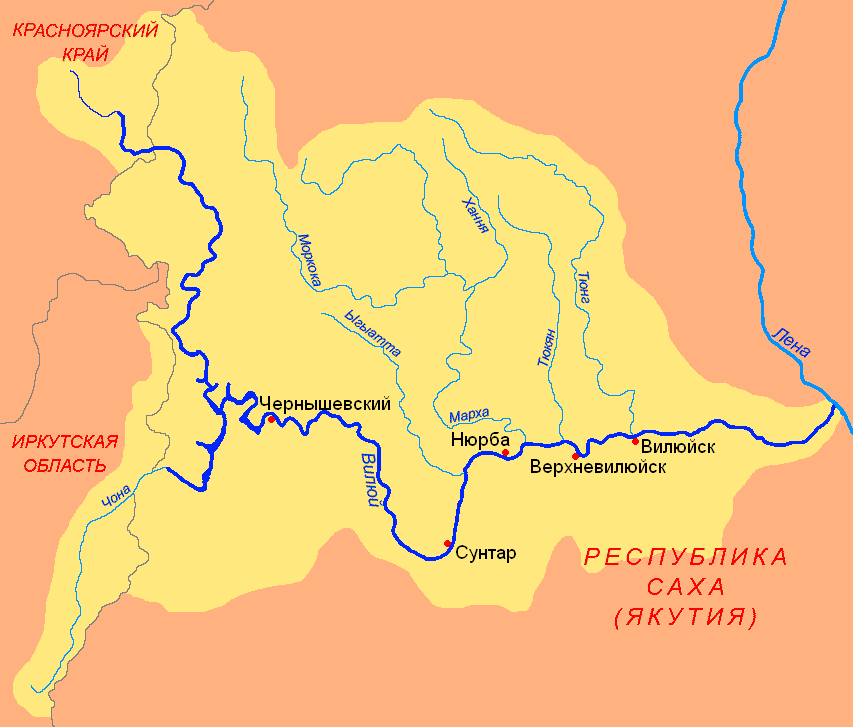
- The T-shaped Chona-Vilyuy River system.

Location
- Country: Sakha, Russia

Physical characteristics
- Source
  - location: Vilyuy Plateau
  - coordinates: 64°24′30″N 112°52′37″E
- Mouth: Vilyuy
  - coordinates: 62.953°N 117.4923°E
- Length: 601 km (373 mi)
- Basin size: 11,200 km^{2} (4,300 mi^{2})
- Discharge
  - average: 30 m^{3}/s (1,100 cu ft/s) (near mouth)

Basin features
- Progression: Vilyuy→ Lena→ Laptev Sea

The Ygyatta (Russian: Ыгыатта, [ɨɡɨɐˈta]; Yakut: Ыгыатта, Igıatta) is a river in Sakha, Russia. It is a left tributary of the Vilyuy. The Ygyatta is 601 kilometres (373 mi) long, and its basin covers about 11,200 square kilometres (4,300 mi^{2}). The depth of the river at its mouth is near 10 metres (33 ft). It rises on the Vilyuy Plateau in the west of Sakha and is fed by rain and snowmelt.

The river and its banks are rich with gems: emeralds, rubies, sards, aquamarines, and others.

There are goldfields along the river.

The basin of the Ygyatta is among the least populated places within Russia.

== See also ==
- List of rivers of Russia
