= Vakunayka =

River in Russia

Vakunayka Вакунайка
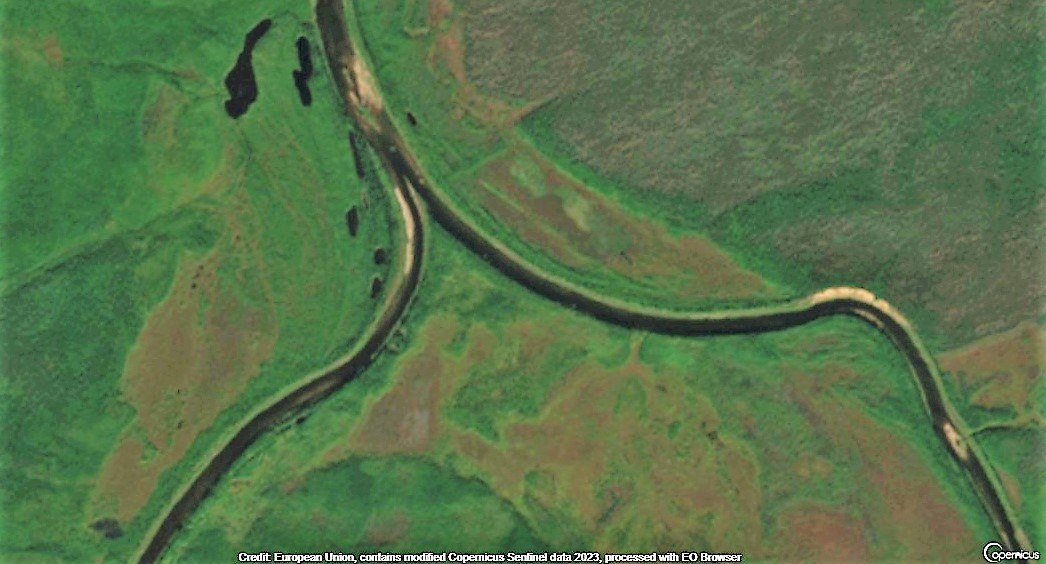
- Confluence of the Chona and the Vakunayka Sentinel-2 image

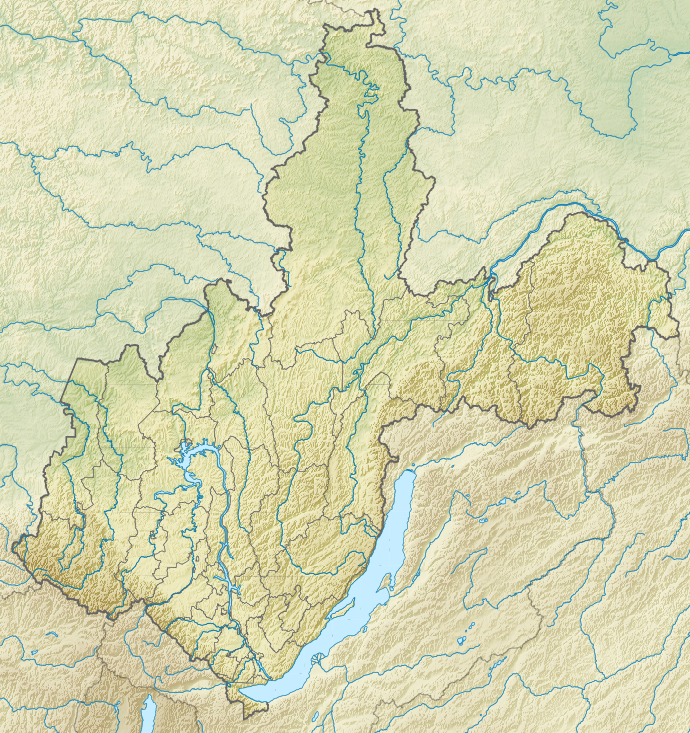
- Mouth location in Yakutia, Russia Vakunayka (Irkutsk Oblast)

Location
- Country: Katangsky District, Irkutsk Oblast; Mirninsky District, Yakutia

Physical characteristics
- Source
  - location: Central Siberian Plateau
  - coordinates: 60°40′08″N 110°05′04″E
- Mouth: Chona
  - coordinates: 61°44′22″N 109°36′25″E
- Length: 362 km (225 mi)
- Basin size: 10,100 km^{2} (3,900 sq mi)

Basin features
- Progression: Chona → Vilyuy→ Lena→ Laptev Sea

The Vakunayka (Russian: Вакунайка; Yakut: Вакунайка) is a river in the Sakha Republic (Yakutia) and Irkutsk Oblast, Russia. It is a right hand tributary of the Chona, and is 363 kilometres (226 mi) long, with a drainage basin of 10,100 square kilometres (3,900 mi^{2}).

There are no permanent settlements by the Vakunayka. The Russian Geographical Society organized an expedition in 1853–55 to survey the orography, geology and population of the Vilyuy and Chona basins.

== Course ==
The river begins in the Central Siberian Plateau. It flows first westwards for a relatively short stretch, then it bends and heads roughly northwards across the middle part of the plateau, in the border area between Irkutsk Oblast and Yakutia. Parts of its floodplain are marshy. Finally the Vakunayka joins the right bank of the Chona 300 km (190 mi) from its mouth in the Vilyuy Reservoir. The river is fed by snow and rain and freezes between October and late May.

The main tributaries of the Vakunayka are the 196 kilometres (122 mi) long Killemtine and the 80 kilometres (50 mi) long Mukoki on the right.

== See also ==
- List of rivers of Russia
