= Bappagay =

- Mouth location in Sakha, Russia

Location
- Country: Russia

Physical characteristics
- Source
  - location: Lena Plateau
- Mouth: Vilyuy
  - coordinates: 64°1′5″N 124°5′40″E
- Length: 307 km (191 mi)
- Basin size: 4,650 km^{2} (1,800 sq mi)

Basin features
- Progression: Vilyuy→ Lena→ Laptev Sea

The Bappagay (Russian: Баппагай) is a river of Sakha Republic, Russia, a right tributary of the Vilyuy. It is 307 kilometres (191 mi) long, and has a drainage basin of 4,650 square kilometres (1,800 sq mi).

== See also ==
- List of rivers of Russia
