= Sen (river) =

River in Yakutia, Russia

Sen Сэн / Сээн
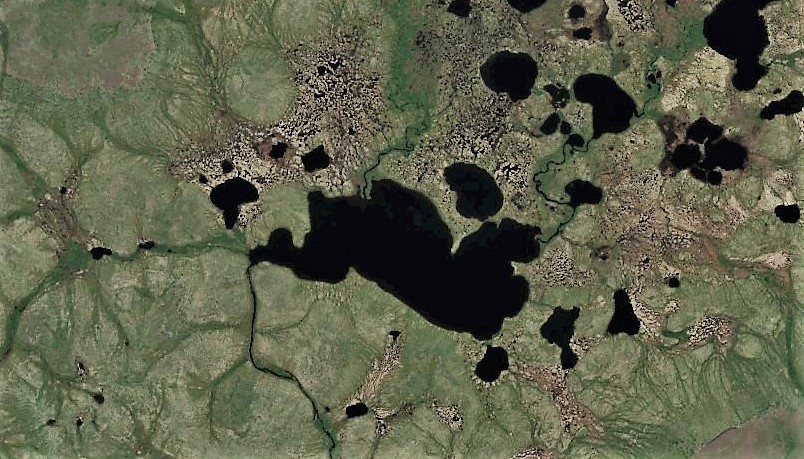
- Sen river source area Sentinel-2 image

- Mouth location in Yakutia, Russia

Location
- Federal Subject: Yakutia

Physical characteristics
- Source
  - location: Lake Burunda; Vilyuy Plateau
  - coordinates: 62°02′38″N 109°13′26″E
  - elevation: 468 m (1,535 ft)
- Mouth: Vilyuy
  - coordinates: 65°02′52″N 109°13′46″E
- Length: 181 km (112 mi)
- Basin size: 3,510 km^{2} (1,360 sq mi)

Basin features
- Progression: Vilyuy→ Lena→ Laptev Sea

The Sen (Russian: Сэн; Yakut: Сээн), also known as Sian (Russian: Сян), is a river in Yakutia (Sakha Republic), Russia. It is a left hand tributary of the Vilyuy, and is 181 kilometres (112 mi) long, with a drainage basin of 3,510 square kilometres (1,360 mi^{2}).

There are no permanent inhabited places in the river area.

== Course ==
The Sen belongs to the upper stretch of the Vilyuy basin. It begins in an area of small lakes of the upper Vilyuy Plateau. In its first stretch it flows across lake Burunda, flowing out of it from the western lakeshore and heading roughly southwards across the plateau. Midway through its course it bends and flows southeastwards for a stretch. In its lower course the Sen bends again southwards meandering strongly in a floodplain with oxbow lakes. Finally, shortly before its mouth it bends westwards and meets the left bank of the Vilyuy 2,044 km (1,270 mi) from its mouth in the Lena. The confluence is almost opposite the mouth of the Ulakhan-Vava in the facing bank.

The main tributaries of the Sen are the 53 kilometres (33 mi) long Dzheltuli and the 26 kilometres (16 mi) long Saalaa-Yurekh from the left. The river freezes between mid October and late May or early June.

== See also ==
- List of rivers of Russia
