= Chirkuo =

River in Yakutia, Russia

Chirkuo Чиркуо
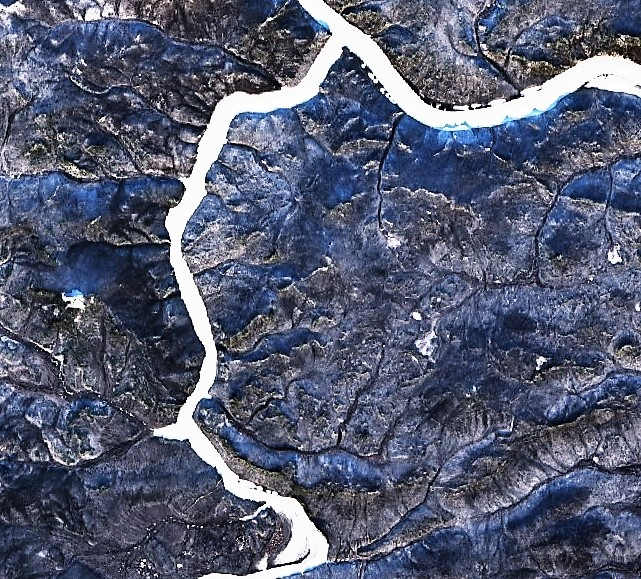
- Chirkuo confluence and inner Vilyuy Reservoir Sentinel-2 image

- Mouth location in the Sakha Republic, Russia

Location
- Federal Subject: Yakutia

Physical characteristics
- Source
  - location: Vilyuy Plateau
  - elevation: 468 m (1,535 ft)
- Mouth: Vilyuy
  - coordinates: 63°29′48″N 109°27′39″E
- Length: 206 km (128 mi)
- Basin size: 7,710 km^{2} (2,980 sq mi)

Basin features
- Progression: Vilyuy→ Lena→ Laptev Sea

The Chirkuo (Russian: Чиркуо) is a river in Yakutia (Sakha Republic), Russia. It is a right hand tributary of the Vilyuy, and is 118 kilometres (73 mi) long —206 kilometres (128 mi) including the Duikhta at its head, with a drainage basin of 7,710 square kilometres (2,980 mi^{2}).

In the Ust-Chirkuo Site (Yakut: Чиркуо төрдө, romanized: Çirkuo tördö) there are remains of ancient settlements by the river. Currently there are no permanent inhabited places in the river area.

== Course ==
The Chirkuo lies in the upper stretch of the Vilyuy basin. It begins at the confluence of the Duikhta and the Kucchuchi-Chuurka (Куччучи-Чуурка) in the Vilyuy Plateau. The river flows roughly northwards across the plateau along the border with Irkutsk Oblast to the west. Finally it meets the right bank of the Vilyuy 1,712 km (1,064 mi) from its mouth in the Lena. The river freezes between mid October and late May.

The main tributaries of the Chirkuo are the 120 kilometres (75 mi) long Golusakh and the 88 kilometres (55 mi) long Dulisma from the left. The last stretch and mouth area of the Chirkuo are part of the backwater of the Vilyuy Reservoir.

== Fauna ==
The waters of the Chirkuo provide a habitat for the critically endangered Siberian sturgeon.

== See also ==
- List of rivers of Russia
- Vilyuy Dam
