= Tyukyan =

River in the Republic of Sakha in Russia

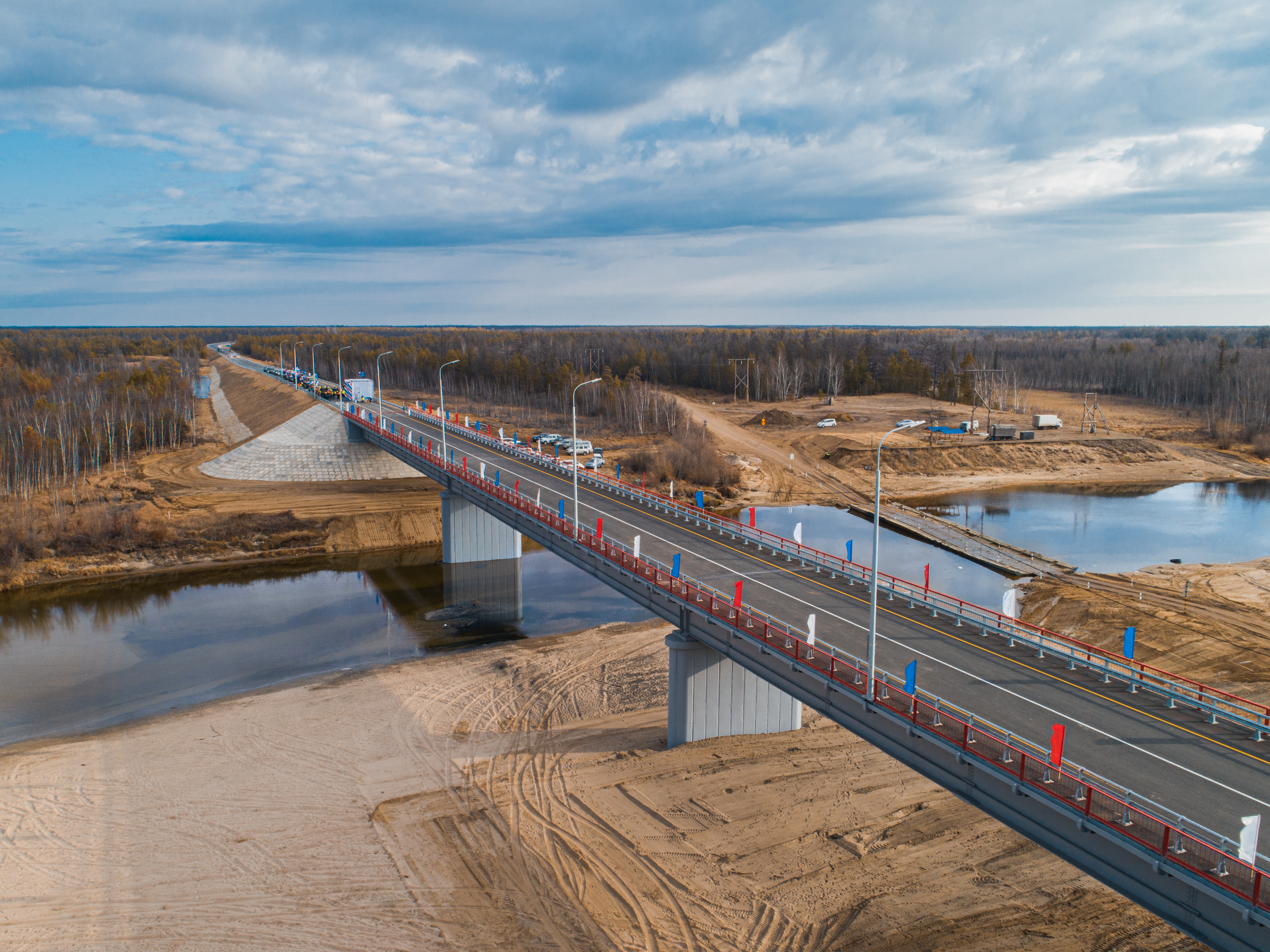
- A bridge over Tyukyan on the 702nd km of A331 highway

- Mouth location in the Sakha Republic, Russia
- Native name: Түүкээн (Yakut)

Location
- Country: Yakutia, Russia

Physical characteristics
- Source
  - location: Central Siberian Plateau
  - coordinates: 66°10′19″N 116°44′26″E
  - elevation: 320 m (1,050 ft)
- Mouth: Vilyuy
  - coordinates: 63°33′48″N 119°45′12″E
  - elevation: 97 m (318 ft)
- Length: 747 km (464 mi)
- Basin size: 16,300 km^{2} (6,300 sq mi)
- Discharge
  - average: 30 m^{3}/s (1,100 cu ft/s)

Basin features
- Progression: Vilyuy→ Lena→ Laptev Sea

The Tyukyan (Russian: Тюкян; Yakut: Түүкээн Tüükeen) is a river in the Republic of Sakha in Russia. It is a left hand tributary of the Vilyuy, and is 747 kilometres (464 mi) long, with a drainage basin of 16,300 square kilometres (6,300 mi^{2}).

There are no permanent settlements by the river, but its source lies close to Eyik village in Olenyoksky District. After flowing across desolate areas it only reaches the inhabited Verkhnevilyuysky District about 50 km (31 mi) upstream from its mouth.

== History ==
In 1634, Russian Cossacks, headed by Voin Shakhov, established a winter settlement at the confluence of the rivers Vilyuy and Tyukyan. This settlement served as the seat of administration of the surrounding area for several decades, after which it was moved to the Yolyonnyokh area 45 kilometers (28 mi) down by the Vilyuy River.

== Course ==
The Tyukyan has its source close to the west of lake Eyik, in the eastern part of the Central Siberian Plateau in a swampy area near the Tyung basin, just south of the Arctic Circle, at an elevation of about 320 metres (1,050 ft). It flows roughly southeastwards and eastwards. When it reaches the Central Yakutian Lowland it begins to meander strongly among swamps and small lakes, flowing roughly southwards, until it meets the left bank of the Vilyuy near Verkhnevilyuysk.

There are numerous thermokarst lakes in the lower Tyukyan river basin. The main tributaries of the Tyukyan are the 85 km (53 mi) long Tenkelyakh (Тэнкэлээх) and the 349 km (217 mi) Chilii (Чилии) from the right. The Tyukyan freezes between mid October and late May.

== See also ==
- List of rivers of Russia
