= Akhtaranda =

River in Yakutia, Russia

Akhtaranda Ахтаранда
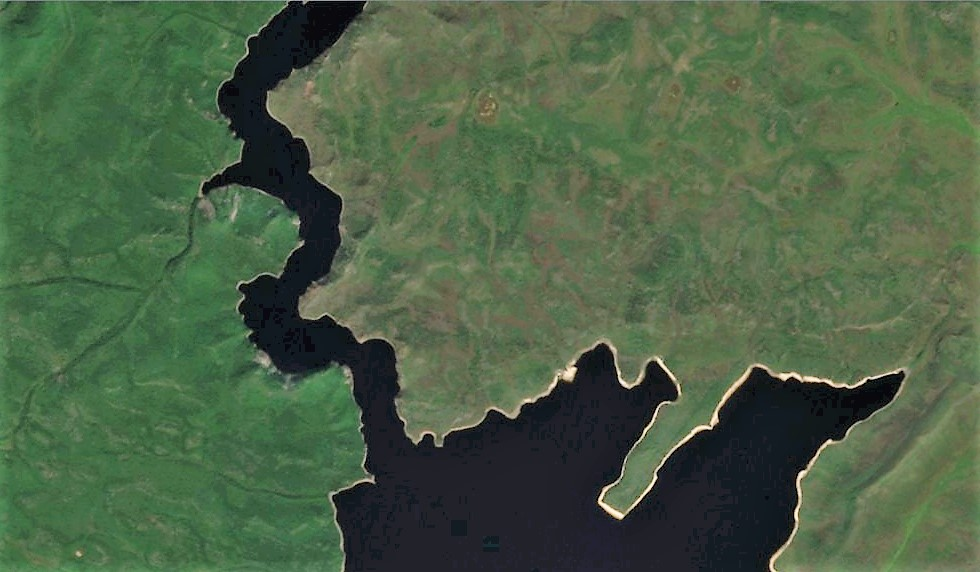
- Mouth of the Akhtaranda in the Vilyuy Reservoir Sentinel-2 image

- Mouth location in Yakutia, Russia

Location
- Federal Subject: Yakutia

Physical characteristics
- Source
  - location: Confluence of the Alymdya and Olguydakh; Vilyuy Plateau
  - coordinates: 63°27′02″N 112°06′50″E
  - elevation: 250 m (820 ft)
- Mouth: Vilyuy
  - location: Vilyuy Reservoir
  - coordinates: 63°06′02″N 112°12′17″E
  - elevation: 246 m (807 ft)
- Length: 75 km (47 mi) (302 km (188 mi) including the Almydya)
- Basin size: 15,700 km^{2} (6,100 sq mi)
- Discharge
  - average: 57.95 m^{3}/s (2,046 cu ft/s) near the Batyr mouth

Basin features
- Progression: Vilyuy→ Lena→ Laptev Sea

The Akhtaranda (Russian: Ахтаранда; Yakut: Ахтаранда), is a river in Yakutia (Sakha Republic), Russia. It is a left hand tributary of the Vilyuy, and is 75 kilometres (47 mi) long —302 km (188 mi) including the length of the Almydya at its head. The Akhtaranda has a drainage basin of 15,700 square kilometres (6,100 mi^{2}).

The river flows across an uninhabited sector of Mirninsky District.

== Course ==
The Akhtaranda belongs to the upper stretch of the Vilyuy basin. It originates at the confluence of the 227 km (141 mi) long Alymdya from the right and the 191 km (119 mi) long Olguydakh from the left. Both rivers flow from the Vilyuy Plateau. It heads roughly southwards meandering slightly among low hills. Finally, it meets the northern shore of the Vilyuy Reservoir 1,336 km (830 mi) from its mouth in the Lena.

=== Tributaries ===
The main tributary of the Akhtaranda is the 221 kilometres (137 mi) long Batyr joining it from the right, and the 78 kilometres (48 mi) long Aannaakh (Аанньаах) from the left. The Akhtaranda freezes in mid October and stays under ice until late May or June.

== See also ==
- List of rivers of Russia
