= Eyik =

Eyik Эйик
- Selo

Other transcription(s)
  - Sakha: Ээйик
- Interactive map of Eyik
- Location of Eyik Eyik (Sakha Republic)
- Coordinates: 66°02′N 117°25′E
- Country: Russia
- Federal subject: Sakha Republic
- Administrative district: Olenyoksky District
- Rural okrugSelsoviet: Shologonsky National Rural Okrug
- Founded: 1934
- Elevation: 336 m (1,102 ft)

Population (2010 Census)
  - Total: 344
  - Estimate (2021): 336 (−2.3%)

Administrative status
  - Capital of: Shologonsky National Rural Okrug

Municipal status
  - Municipal district: Olenyoksky Municipal District
  - Rural settlement: Shologonsky Rural Settlement
  - Capital of: Shologonsky Rural Settlement
- Time zone: UTC+
- Postal code: 678488
- OKTMO ID: 98642450101

Eyik (Russian: Эйик; Yakut: Ээйик, Eeyik) is a rural locality (a selo), the only inhabited locality, and the administrative center of Shologonsky National Rural Okrug of Olenyoksky District in the Sakha Republic, Russia, located 550 kilometers (340 mi) from Olenyok, the administrative center of the district. Its population as of the 2010 Census was 344, down from 346 recorded during the 2002 Census.

== Geography ==
Eyik is located by the northern shore of lake Eyik in the eastern part of the Central Siberian Plateau. The source of the Tyukyan river is close to the village.
