= Tas-Yuryakh =

Tas-Yuryakh Тас-Юрях
- Selo
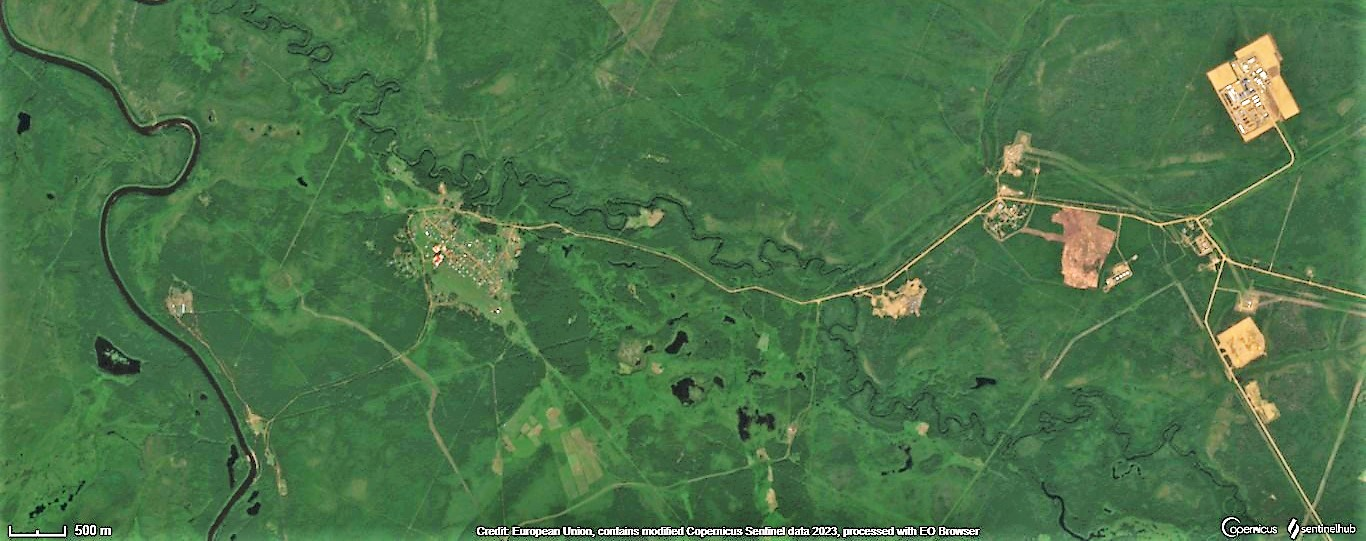
- Ulakhan-Botuobuya river and Tas-Yuryakh village Sentinel-2 image
- Interactive map of Tas-Yuryakh
- Location of Tas-Yuryakh Tas-Yuryakh (Sakha Republic)
- Coordinates: 61°47′20″N 113°01′34″E
- Country: Russia
- Federal subject: Sakha Republic
- Administrative district: Mirninsky District
- Rural okrugSelsoviet: Botuobuyinsky Rural Okrug

Population (2010 Census)
  - Total: 480
  - Estimate (2021): 406 (−15.4%)

Administrative status
  - Capital of: Botuobuyinsky Rural Okrug

Municipal status
  - Municipal district: Mirninsky Municipal District
  - Rural settlement: Botuobuyinsky Rural Settlement
  - Capital of: Botuobuyinsky Nasleg
- Time zone: UTC+
- Postal code: 678184
- OKTMO ID: 98631404101

Tas-Yuryakh (Russian: Тас-Юрях; Yakut: Таас Үрэх, romanized: Taas Ürex, lit. 'Stony Little River') is a rural locality (a selo), the only inhabited locality, and the administrative center of Botuobuyinsky Nasleg of Mirninsky District in the Sakha Republic, Russia, located 157 kilometers (98 mi) from Mirny, the administrative center of the district. Its population as of the 2010 Census was 480, down from 566 recorded during the 2002 Census.

== Geography ==
Tas-Yuryakh village is located close to the confluence of the Ulakhan-Botuobuya and its largest tributary, the Tas-Yuryakh.
