= A322 highway =

Road in Russia

Federal Highway A322
- Федеральная автомобильная дорога А322

Route information
- Part of AH64
- Length: 332 km (206 mi)

Major junctions
- North end: Barnaul
- South end: Kazakh border

Location
- Country: Russia

Highway system
- Russian Federal Highways
← A 321	→ A 331

The Russian route A322, also known as "Barnaul – Rubtsovsk – the border with Kazakhstan", is a road in Russia. Its length is about 332 km.

== Gallery ==
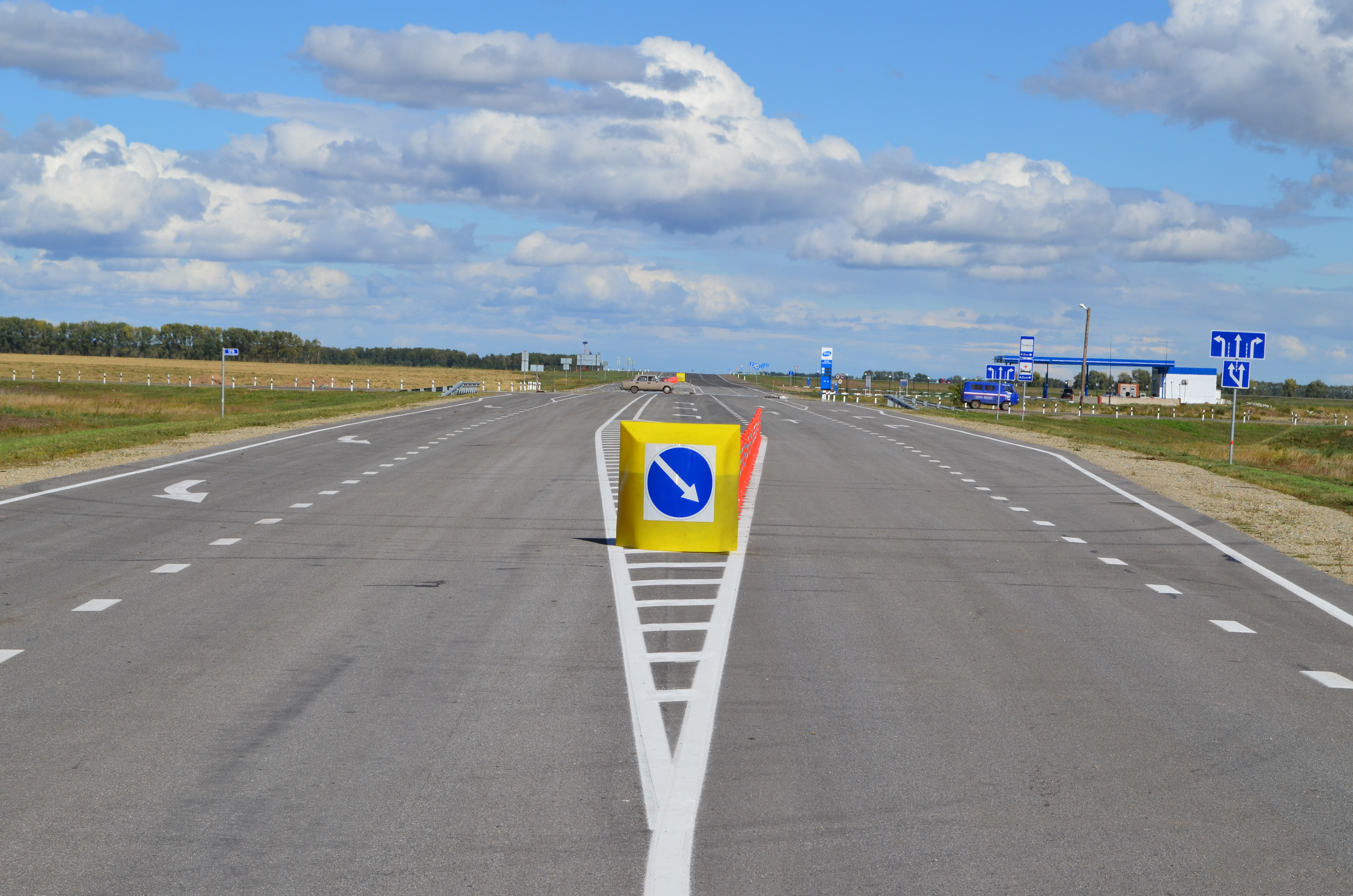
The 176th km of A322 highway near Shipunovo in Shipunovsky District of Altai Krai

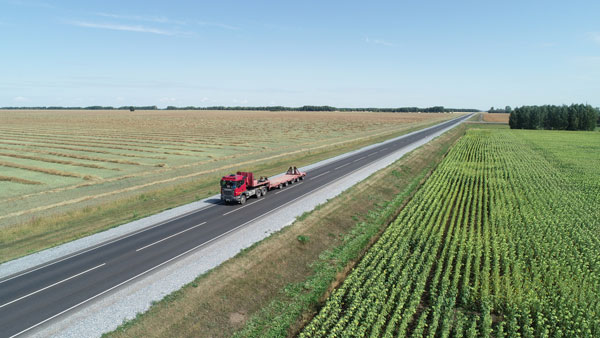
A322 highway in Pospelikhinsky District in Altai Krai, Russia

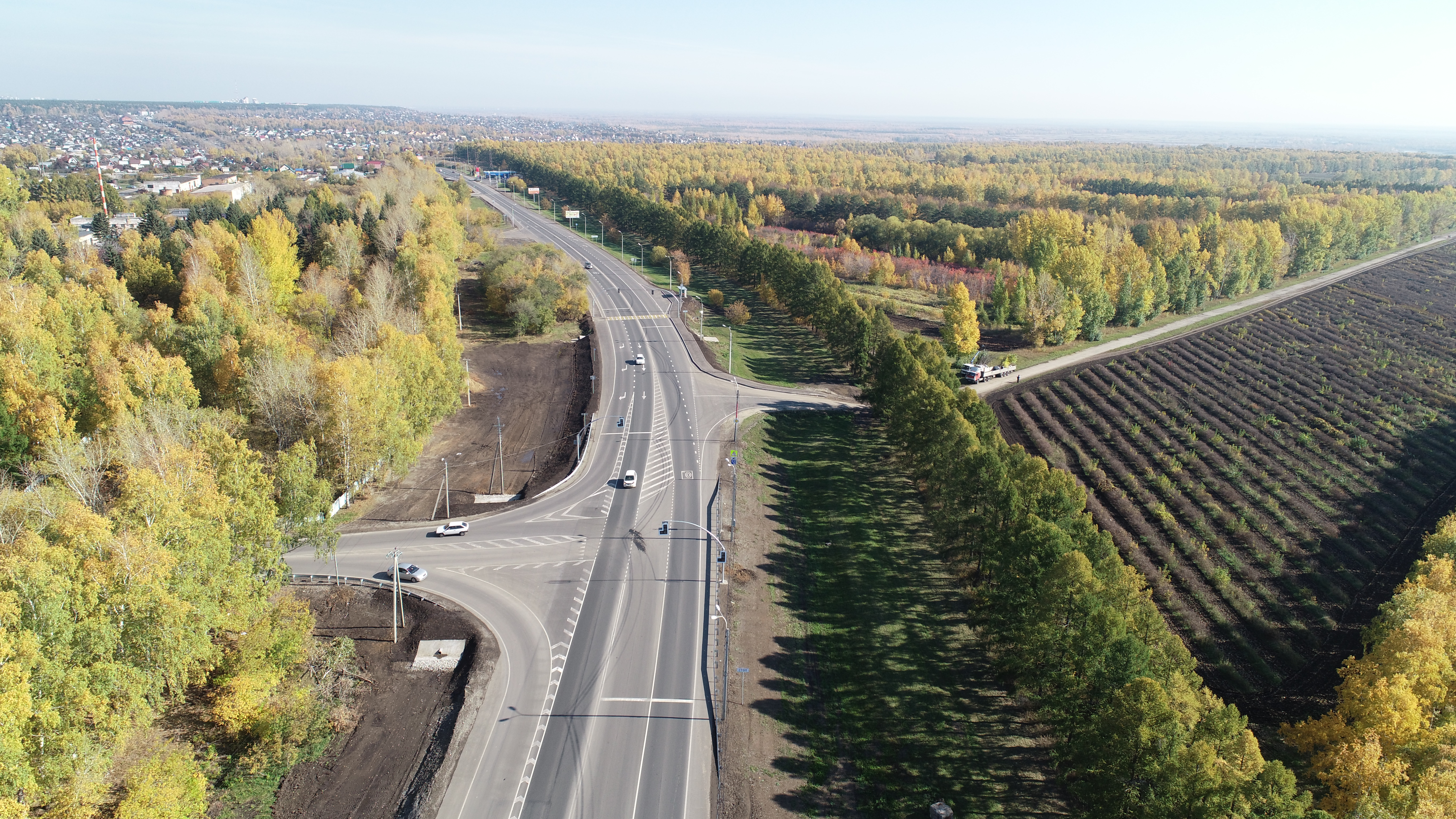
The 16th km of A322 road at the entrance to Barnaul of Altai Krai, Russia
