= Lakharchana =

River in Yakutia, Russia

Lakharchana Лахарчана / Лахарчаана
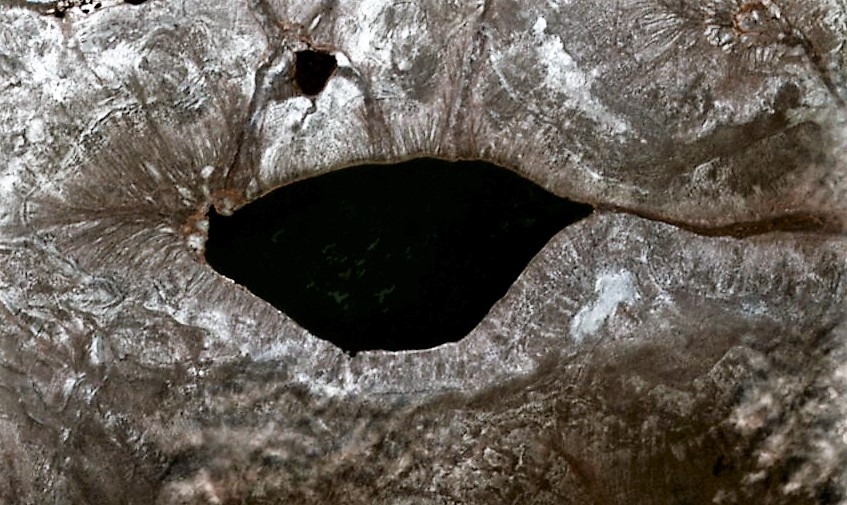
- Lakharchana lake at the river source area Sentinel-2 image

- Mouth location in Yakutia, Russia

Location
- Federal Subject: Yakutia

Physical characteristics
- Source
  - location: Lake Lakharchana; Vilyuy Plateau
  - coordinates: 65°07′58″N 110°42′52″E
- Mouth: Vilyuy
  - coordinates: 64°07′35″N 109°35′06″E
- Length: 202 km (126 mi)
- Basin size: 7,130 km^{2} (2,750 sq mi)

Basin features
- Progression: Vilyuy→ Lena→ Laptev Sea

The Lakharchana (Russian: Лахарчана; Yakut: Лахарчаана, romanized: Laxarçâna), is a river in Yakutia (Sakha Republic), Russia. It is a left hand tributary of the Vilyuy, and is 202 kilometres (126 mi) long, with a drainage basin of 7,130 square kilometres (2,750 mi^{2}).

The river flows across an uninhabited sector of Mirninsky District.

== Course ==
The Lakharchana belongs to the upper stretch of the Vilyuy basin. It originates in lake Lakharchana, a 3.2 km^{2} (1.2 sq mi) lake of the Vilyuy Plateau, flowing out of it from the eastern lakeshore. It heads first eastwards for a short stretch and then bends southwards, bending again and heading to the west for another short stretch until it finally bends to the south and heads roughly in that direction across the plateau. About midway through its course it bends and flows roughly southeastwards meandering in a floodplain among smooth hills. Finally, it meets the left bank of the Vilyuy 1,831 km (1,138 mi) from its mouth in the Lena.

=== Tributaries ===
The main tributary of the river, longer than the Lakharchana itself, is the 204 kilometres (127 mi) long Khakhsyk joining it from the right. Another important tributary is the 124 kilometres (77 mi) long Byotyoryo (including the Ivan-Kyuyolyun-Seine tributary at its head) from the right. The Lakharchana freezes in mid October and stays under ice until late May.

== See also ==
- List of rivers of Russia
