= A331 highway (Russia) =

Road in Russia

Federal Highway A331
- Федеральная автомобильная дорога А331

Route information
- Length: 1,166 km (725 mi)

Major junctions
- West end: Mirny
- East end: Yakutsk

Location
- Country: Russia

Highway system
- Russian Federal Highways
| ← A 322 | → A 333 |

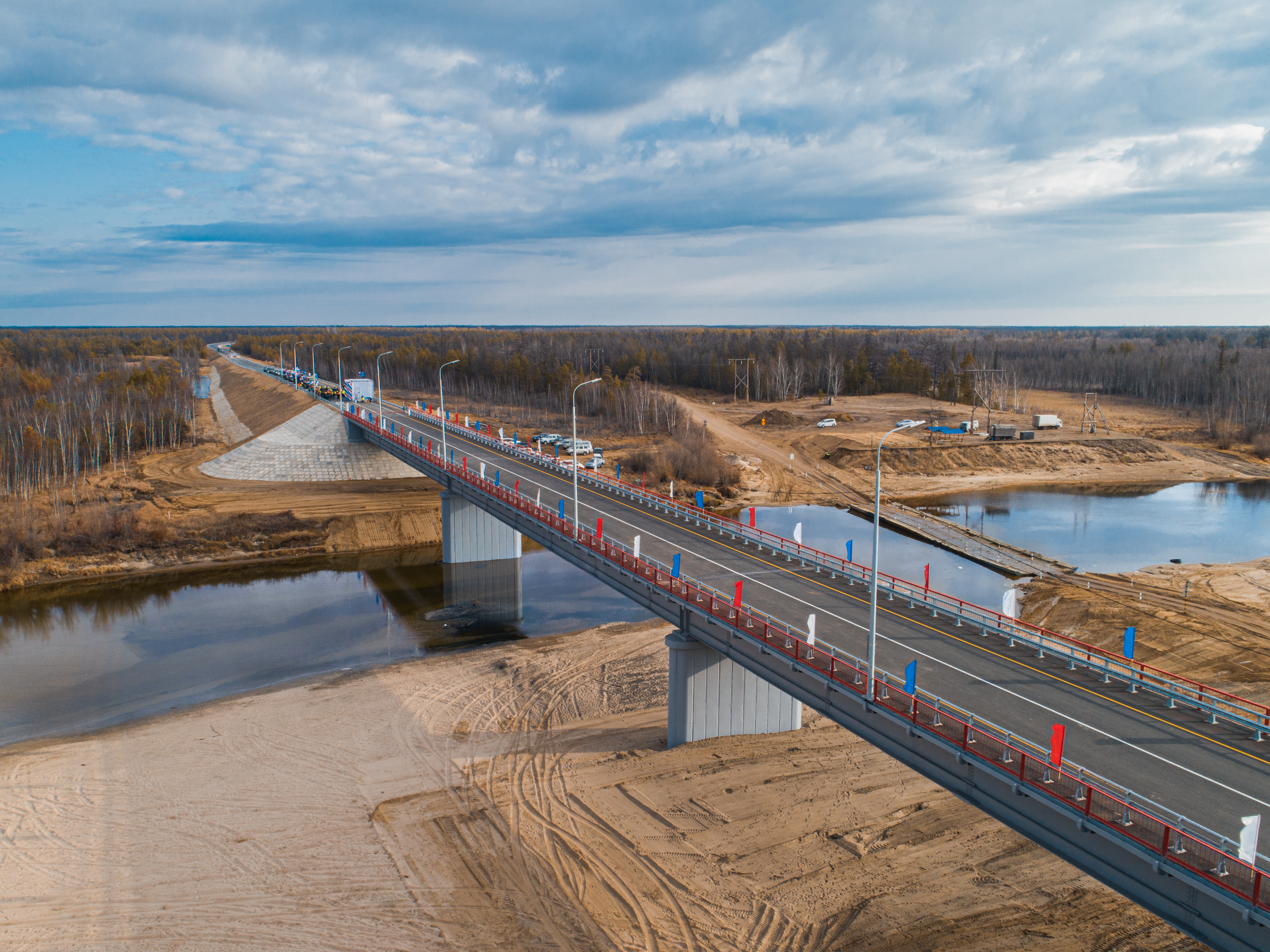
A bridge over Tyukyan River (the 702nd km)

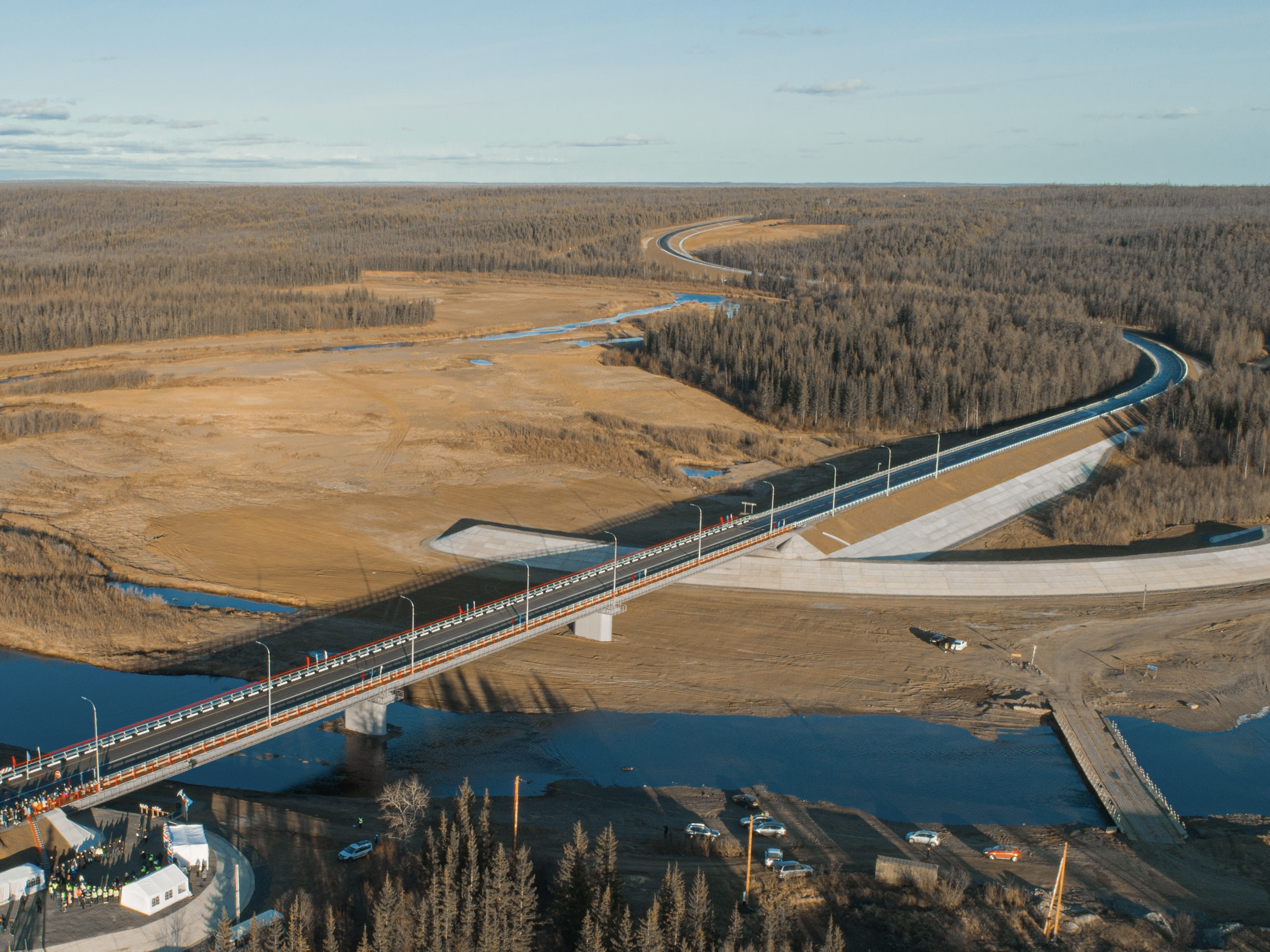
A bridge over Malaya Botuobuya river (the 1151st km of the highway)

The A331 Highway, also known as the Vilyuy Highway, is a highway in Russia connecting Yakutsk to Mirny, the highway is 1,166 km (724 mi), the first half of the highway from Yakutsk to Vilyuysk is paved with a few short unpaved sections in between.The next half of the highway(Vilyuysk to Mirny) is not paved.

== Major junctions ==
| Name of town/road | Mi | Km |
|---|---|---|
| Sergelyakhskoyle Shosse | 0 | 0 |
| Berdigestyakh | 109 | 177 |
| Vilyuysk | 353 | 569 |
| Verkhnevilyuysk | 403 | 650 |
| Zharkhan | 464 | 748 |
| Suntar | 590 | 950 |
| 98K-015 | 715 | 1151 |
| Mirny | 724 | 1166 |
