= Eyik (lake) =

Lake in Russia

- Эйик / Ээйик
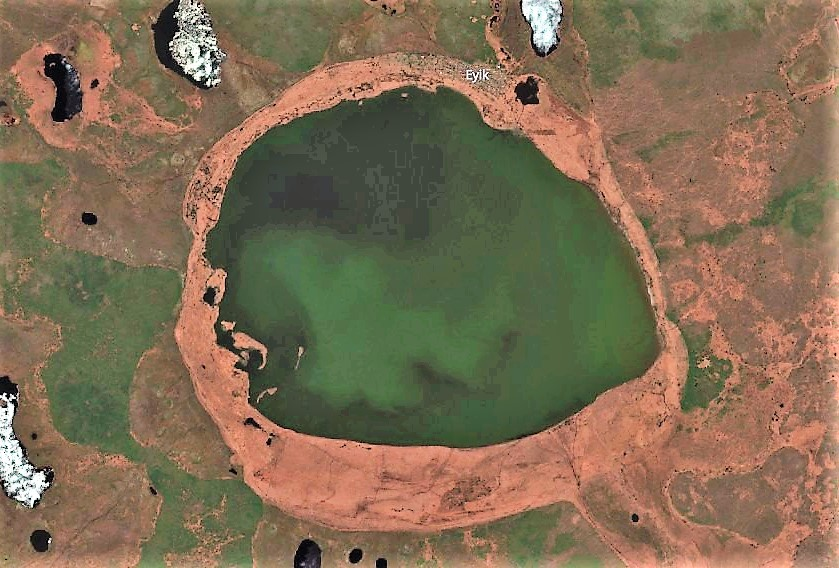
- Eyik Sentinel-2 image

- Location in the Sakha Republic, Russian Far East
- Location: Sakha Republic, Russia
- Coordinates: 66°0′N 117°24′E
- Primary outflows: Unnamed Tyukyan tributary
- Basin countries: Russia
- Max. length: 5.7 km (3.5 mi)
- Max. width: 6.3 km (3.9 mi)
- Surface area: 23 km^{2} (8.9 sq mi)
- Surface elevation: 310 m (1,020 ft)
- Frozen: September / October to June
- Islands: Yes

Eyik (Russian: Эйик; Yakut: Ээйик, Eeyik) is a lake in the Sakha Republic (Yakutia), Russia. It is the largest lake in Olenyoksky District.

Lake Eyik provides a habitat for the Siberian Crane, a Critically Endangered species.

== Geography ==
Eyik is located in the eastern part of the Central Siberian Plateau. Located at southern end of Olenyoksky District. Eyik village lies near the northern lakeside.

Lake Eyik is almost round in shape. There are a few small islands in the southwestern area of the lake, not far from the shoreline. The outflow of the lake is a left tributary of the Tyukyan, a river of the Lena basin, flowing from the southern shore in a southeastern direction. The sources of river Tyukyan are in a large wooded swamp to the west of the lake.

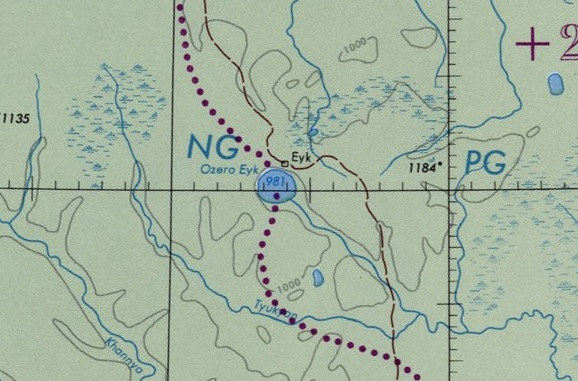
Lake Eyik ONC map section.

== See also ==
- List of lakes of Russia
