= Ekonda =

Ekonda Эконда
- Rural settlement
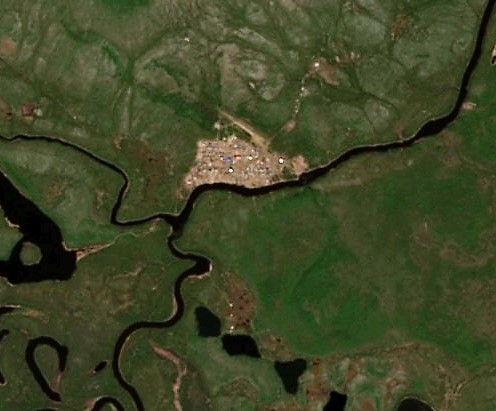
- Interactive map of Ekonda
- Location of Ekonda Ekonda (Krasnoyarsk Krai)
- Coordinates: 65°46′N 105°20′E
- Country: Russia
- Federal subject: Krasnoyarsk Krai
- Administrative district: Evenkiysky District
- Founded: 1947

Area
  - Total: 0.43 km^{2} (0.17 sq mi)
- Elevation: 500 m (1,600 ft)

Population (2010 Census)
  - Total: 291
  - Estimate (2025): 329 (+13.1%)
  - Density: 680/km^{2} (1,800/sq mi)
- Time zone: UTC+7 (MSK+4)
- Postal code: 648592
- OKTMO ID: 04650453101

Ekonda (Russian: Эконда) is a rural locality in Evenkiysky District of Krasnoyarsk Krai, Russia, located in an area of lakes. Population: 317 (2021 census); 291 (2010 census); KrasAvia operates flights to Ekonda.

== Geography ==
Ekonda is located by the left bank of the Vilyuy river, a little downstream from the confluence with the Pasporin. Tura, the administrative center of Evenkiysky District, lies roughly 200 km (120 mi) to the southwest. Lake Suringda, one of the largest in the area, lies to the south.
