= Markha (Vilyuy) =

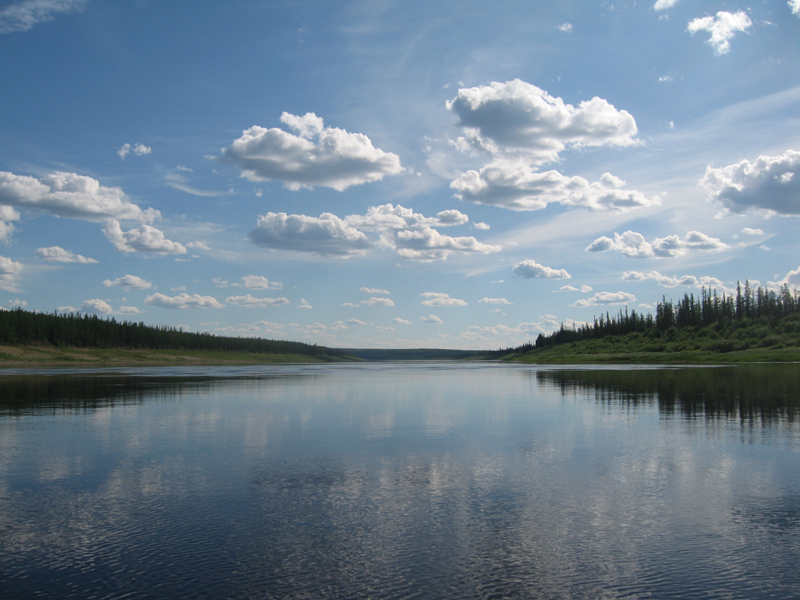
- View of the river

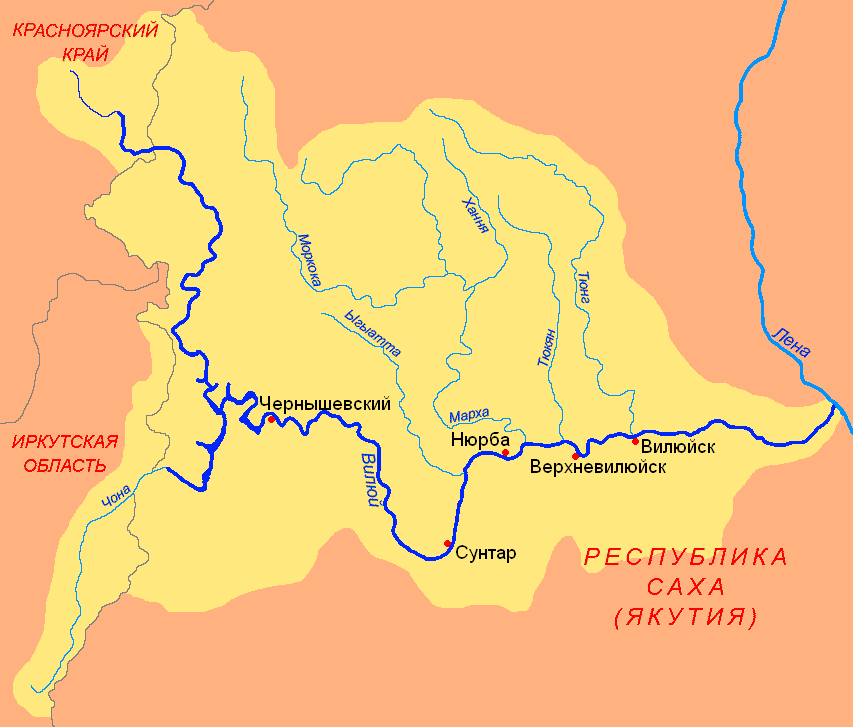
- The T-shaped Chona-Vilyuy River system.

- Mouth location in Yakutia, Russia Markha (Vilyuy) (Russia)

Location
- Country: Russia

Physical characteristics
- Source
  - location: Muosaany Lake
  - coordinates: 66°09′01″N 111°19′08″E
  - elevation: 700 metres (2,300 ft)
- Mouth: Vilyuy
  - coordinates: 63°27′59″N 118°54′11″E
  - elevation: 100 metres (330 ft)
- Length: 1,181 km (734 mi)
- Basin size: 99,000 km^{2} (38,000 sq mi)
- Discharge
  - average: 405 cubic metres per second (14,300 cu ft/s)

Basin features
- Progression: Vilyuy→ Lena→ Laptev Sea
- Tributaries
  - right: Morkoka

Markha (Russian: Марха́; Yakut: Марха өрүс, Marxa örüs) is a river in the Sakha Republic in Russia. It is a left tributary of the Vilyuy (in the drainage basin of the Lena). The Markha is 1,181 kilometres (734 mi) long, with a drainage basin of 99,000 square kilometres (38,000 mi^{2}). Its average discharge is 405 cubic metres per second (14,300 cu ft/s).

== Course ==
The river has its sources on the Vilyuy Plateau, a part of the Central Siberian Plateau. It joins the left bank of the Vilyuy 518 km (322 mi) from its mouth.

== See also ==
- List of rivers of Russia
