= Vilyuy Plateau =

Mountain plateau in Russia

- Вилюйское плато
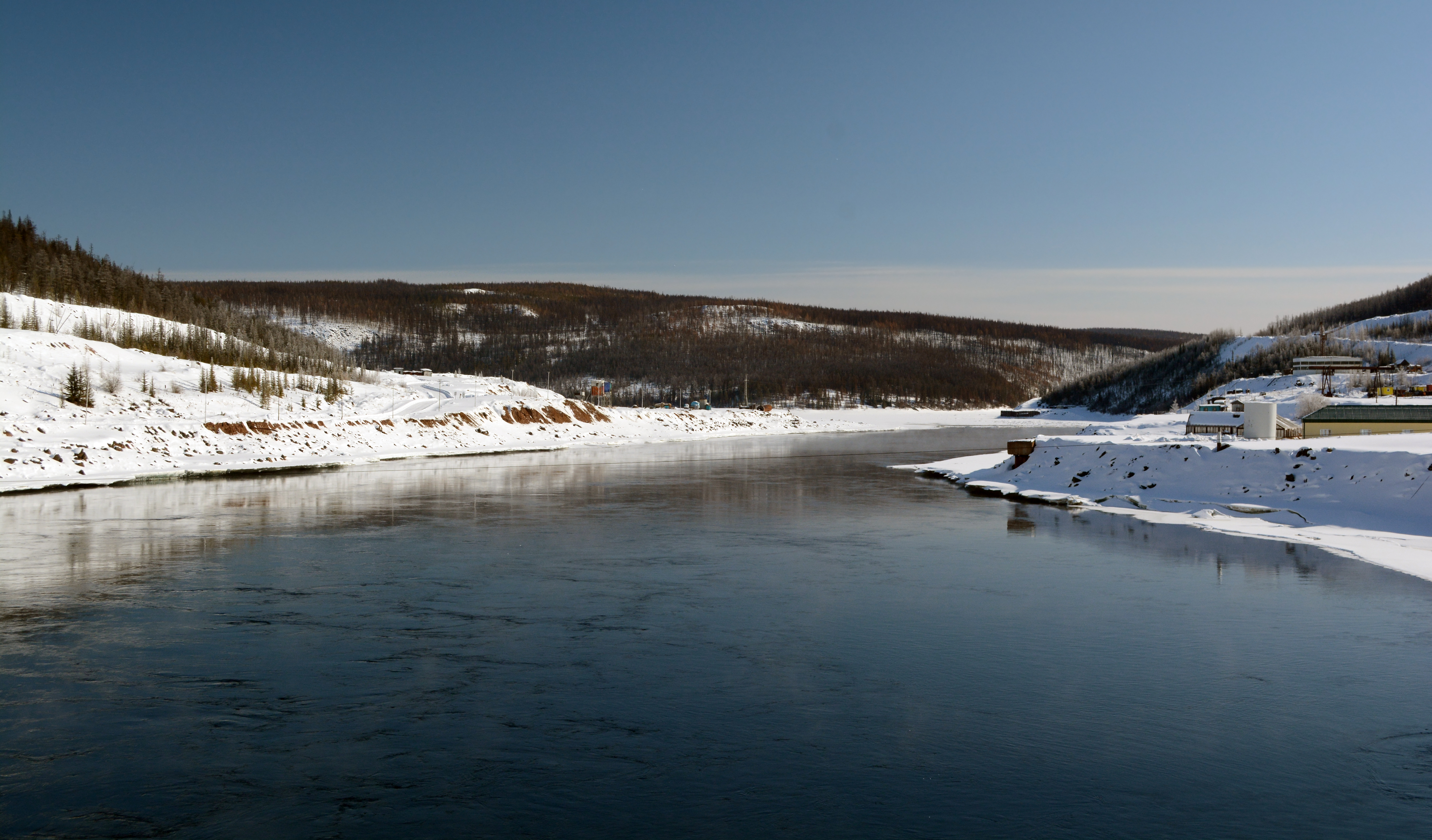
- View of the Vilyuy Reservoir

Highest point
- Peak: Unnamed
- Elevation: 962 m (3,156 ft)

Dimensions
- Length: 400 km (250 mi)
- Width: 200 km (120 mi)

Geography
- Location within Sakha Republic
- Country: Russia
- Federal subject: Krasnoyarsk Krai and Sakha Republic
- Range coordinates: 66°30′N 109°45′E
- Parent range: Central Siberian Plateau
- Borders on: Irkutsk Oblast

Geology
- Rock ages: Lower Paleozoic and Precambrian
- Rock types: Trap rock, dolomite and Limestone

The Vilyuy Plateau (Russian: Вилюйское плато, romanized: Vilyuyskoye Plato) is a mountain plateau in Krasnoyarsk Krai and the Sakha Republic (Yakutia), Siberia, Russia. It is a part of the Central Siberian Plateau and it is made up mainly of the upper course section of the Vilyuy River.

Permafrost thickness up to 1,500 metres (4,900 ft), the largest in the world, was discovered under the Vilyuy Plateau.

== Geography ==
The Vilyuy Plateau is located both north and south of the Arctic Circle in northeastern Krasnoyarsk Krai and western Sakha Republic. To the southwest it borders Irkutsk Oblast. To the north rises the Anabar Plateau, to the west the Syverma Plateau and to the northwest the Putorana Mountains. To the east the plateau descends gradually towards the broad Lena River valley and to the southeast it runs into the Central Yakutian Lowland, which leads to the Lena Plateau on the southern side. The average height of the Vilyuy Plateau surface is around 700 meters (2,300 ft) and the highest point is a 962 metres (3,156 ft) high unnamed summit.

The major rivers having their source in the plateau are the Vilyuy, Markha, Olenyok, Ygyatta and Lakharchana, as well as the Akhtaranda —with the Alymdya and Olguydakh. Rivers Ulakhan-Botuobuya, Sen and Chirkuo flow across it. There are also numerous lakes, including Suringda and the man-made Vilyuy Reservoir.

== Flora and climate ==
There is larch taiga on the mountain slopes, with thickets of prostrate alder and mountain tundra on the higher elevations. There are meadows in the river valleys.

The climate prevailing in the Vilyuy Plateau is subarctic continental. The winters are some of the most severe in the Northern Hemisphere.
