= Vilyuy Dam =

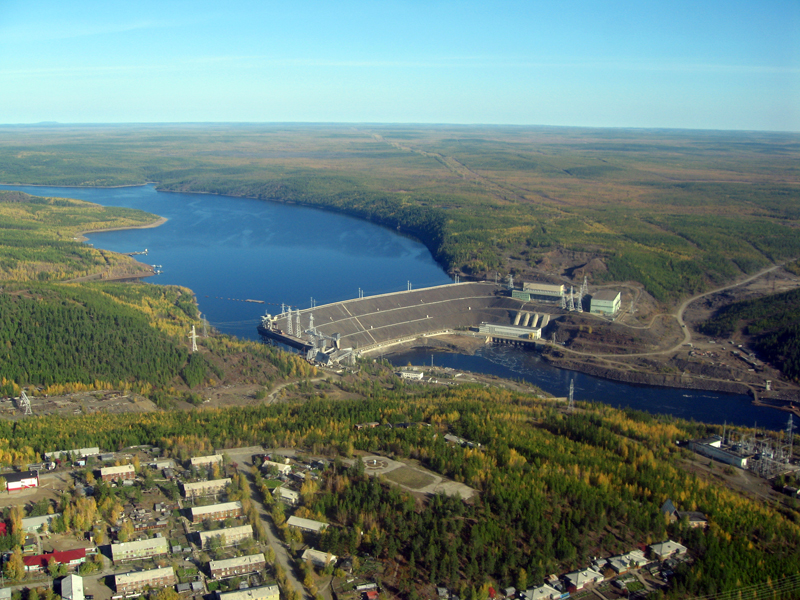

- Location within Russia
- Location: Sakha Republic, Russia
- Coordinates: 63°01′55″N 112°28′19″E
- Construction began: 1964
- Opening date: 1967

Dam and spillways
- Type of dam: Embankment
- Impounds: Vilyuy River
- Height: 75 m (246 ft)
- Length: 600 m (2,000 ft)
- Spillway capacity: 5,970 m^{3}/s (211,000 cu ft/s)

Reservoir
- Total capacity: 35.9 km^{3} (29,100,000 acre⋅ft)
- Surface area: 2,501 km^{2} (966 mi^{2})

Power Station
- Installed capacity: 650 MW
- Annual generation: 2,710 GWh

The Vilyuy Dam (Russian: Вилюйская ГЭС; Yakut: Бүлүүтээҕи ГЭС, romanized: Bülüüteeği GES) is a large dam and hydroelectric power station on the Vilyuy River in Chernyshevsky, Mirninsky District, Sakha Republic (Yakutia), Russia. The dam was built between 1964 and 1967 to provide power for diamond mines in the area. It is located in the southern part of the Vilyuy Plateau and was one of the first of such major structures in the world to be built on permafrost. Vilyuy is reported to have the coldest operating conditions of any hydroelectric plant in the world.

The dam is an embankment structure 75 metres (246 ft) high and 600 metres (2,000 ft) long, containing 5,000,000 m^{3} (6,500,000 yd^{3}) of fill. Its power station has four turbines with a combined capacity of 650 MW, generating 2,710 million KWh annually.

== Vilyuy Reservoir ==
Behind the dam, the Vilyuy Reservoir started filling in 1969 and topped out in 1973. It is one of the largest man-made lakes in the world, with a length of 450 km (280 mi) and holding up to 35.9 km^{3} (29,100,000 acre⋅ft) of water. The backwater system of the large artificial lake extends along the Vilyui River to the mouth of its Chirkuo tributary. Other tributaries of the Vilyuy having their mouth in the reservoir are the Chona and the Akhtaranda. The flooded area has caused the winter temperature of the Vilyuy River to increase by 5 to 6 °C (9.0 to 10.8 °F), and has greatly reduced flooding on the lower part of the river, leading to declines in bird and fish populations. The filling of the reservoir also displaced about 600 people.

== See also ==
- Chona
