= Chona =

River in Russia

Chona Чона / Чуона
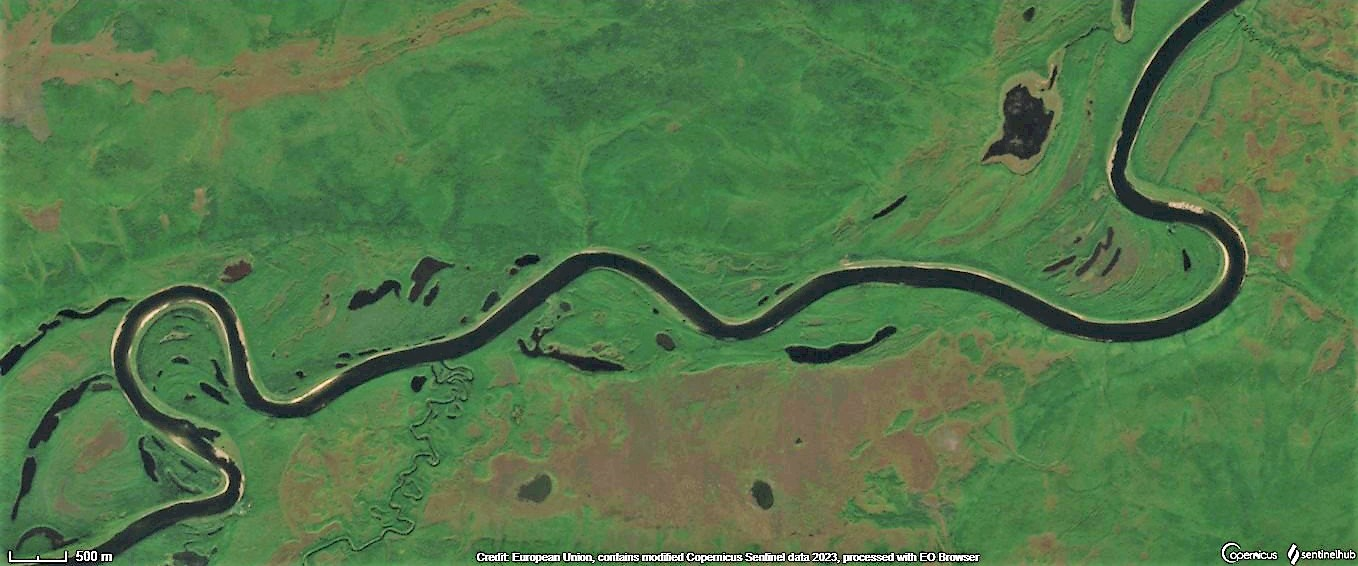
- Chona meanders Sentinel-2 image

- Mouth location in the Sakha Republic, Russia

Location
- Country: Sakha & Irkutsk Oblast

Physical characteristics
- Source
  - location: Lena Plateau
  - coordinates: 59°26′10″N 108°49′44″E
  - elevation: 468 m (1,535 ft)
- Mouth: Vilyuy
  - location: Vilyuy Reservoir
  - coordinates: 62°04′31″N 110°41′27″E
  - elevation: 246 m (807 ft)
- Length: 802 km (498 mi)
- Basin size: 40,600 km^{2} (15,700 sq mi)
- Discharge
  - average: 125 m^{3}/s (4,400 cu ft/s)

Basin features
- Progression: Vilyuy→ Lena→ Laptev Sea

The Chona (Russian: Чона; Yakut: Чуона, Çuona) is a river in the Sakha Republic (Yakutia) and Irkutsk Oblast, Russia. It is a right hand tributary of the Vilyuy, and is 802 kilometres (498 mi) long, with a drainage basin of 40,600 square kilometres (15,700 mi^{2}).

The Russian Geographical Society organized an expedition in 1853–55 to survey the orography, geology and population of the Vilyuy and Chona basins.

== Course ==
The river begins in the Lena Plateau, part of the Central Siberian Plateau, at an elevation of 317 metres (1,040 ft). It flows roughly northeastwards forming rapids which make the river not navigable. The lowest 170 km (110 mi) of its course were flooded by the Vilyuy Reservoir after the Vilyuy Dam was built in 1967. The river freezes between October and late May.

The main tributaries of the Chona are the 362 kilometres (225 mi) long Vakunayka and the 105 kilometres (65 mi) long Ichoda on the right, and the 158 kilometres (98 mi) long Dekinde, the 122 kilometres (76 mi) long Delinde and the 109 kilometres (68 mi) long Markhaya on the left. There are no permanent settlements by the Chona.

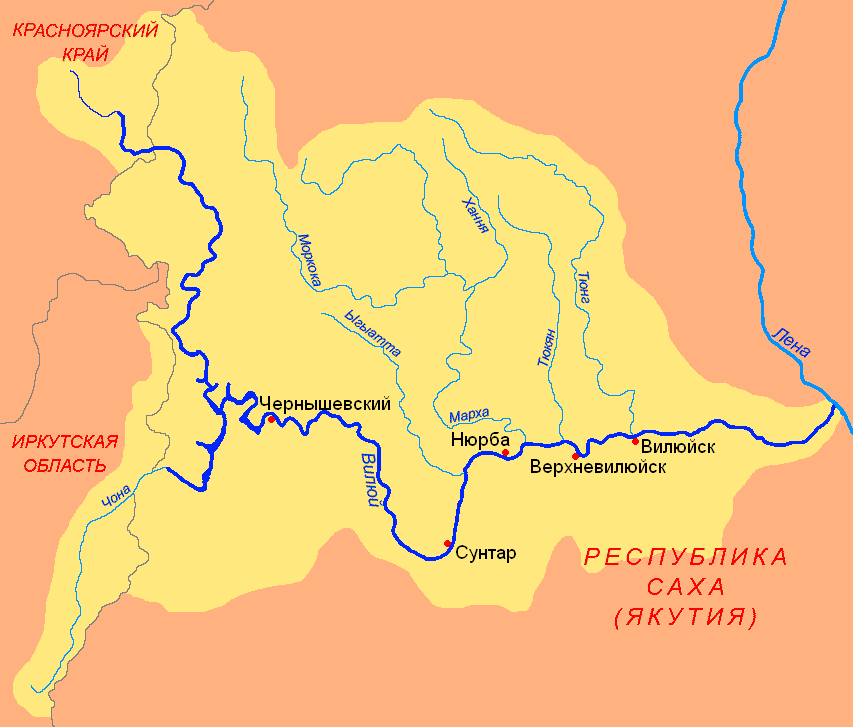
The T-shaped Chona-Vilyuy River system with the Chona in the lower left.

== See also ==
- List of rivers of Russia
