= Vilyuy =

Vilyuy Вилю́й / Бүлүү
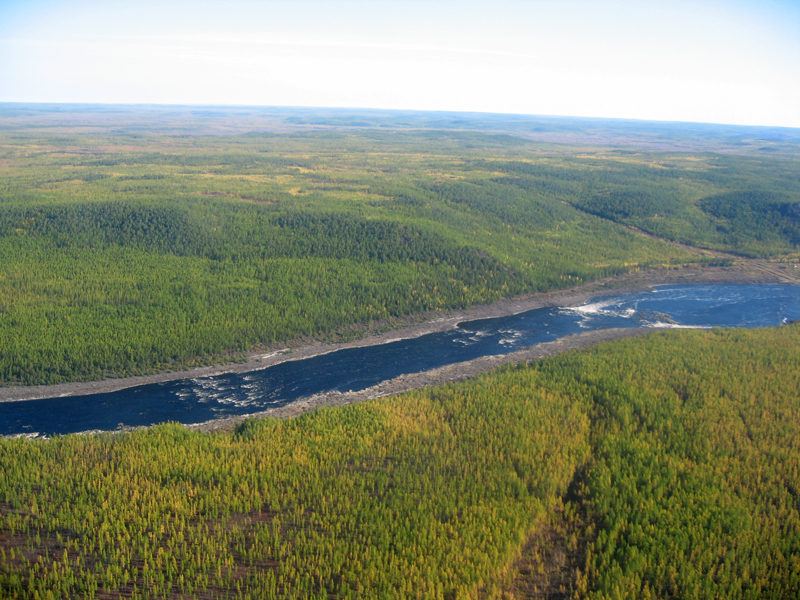
- Rapids on the Vilyuy in Central Sakha

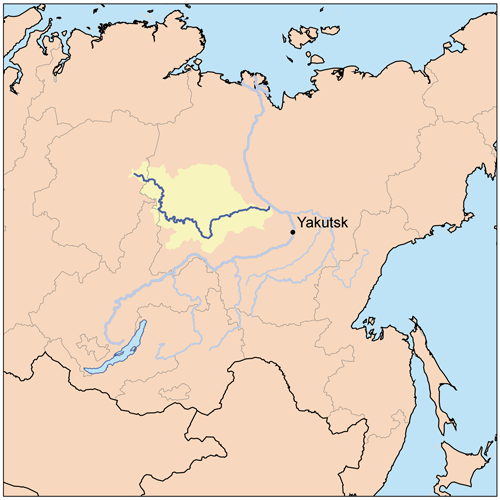
- Location of the Vilyuy River and watershed

Location
- Country: Russia
- Federal subjects: Krasnoyarsk Krai, Yakutia

Physical characteristics
- Source
  - location: Vilyuy Plateau
  - coordinates: 65°57′46″N 103°30′47″E
  - elevation: 520 m (1,710 ft)
- Mouth: Lena
  - coordinates: 64°22′38″N 126°24′54″E
  - elevation: 55 m (180 ft)
- Length: 2,650 km (1,650 mi)
- Basin size: 454,000 km^{2} (175,000 mi^{2})
- Discharge
  - average: 1,700 m^{3}/s (60,000 cu ft/s)

Basin features
- Progression: Lena→ Laptev Sea

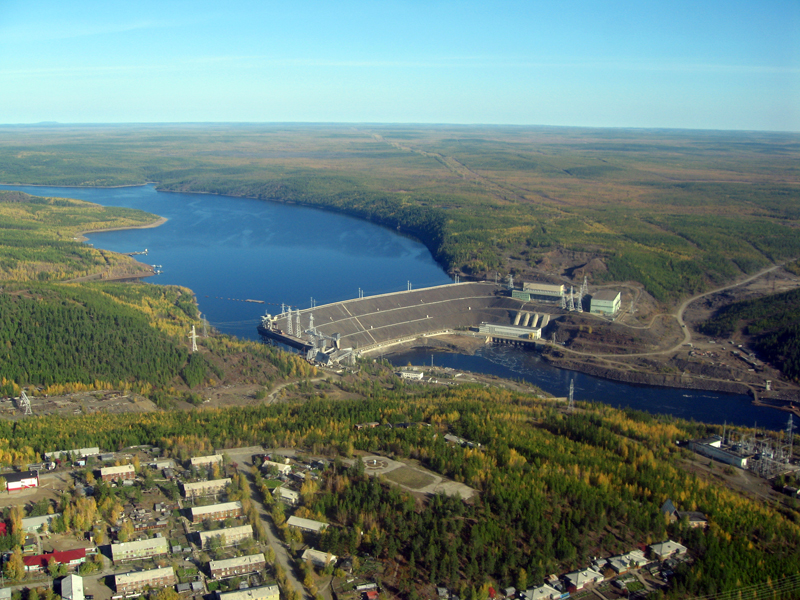
Vilyuy Dam and a hydroelectric station on the river

The Vilyuy (Russian: Вилю́й, IPA: [vʲɪˈlʲʉj]; Yakut: Бүлүү, Bülüü, [bylyː]) is a river in Russia, the longest tributary of the Lena. About 2,650 kilometres (1,650 mi) long, it flows mostly within the Sakha Republic. Its basin covers about 454,000 square kilometres (175,000 mi^{2}).

== History ==
Early mentions of the river are dated by the first half of the 17th century in connection with the Russian conquest of Siberia, when the Верхне-Вилюйское зимовье winter settlement (zimovye) was established, which gave rise to the town of Vilyuysk.

In the 1950s, diamond deposits were discovered in the area, about 700 kilometres (430 mi) from its mouth. This led to the construction of the Mir Mine, together with access roads and an airport, and the Vilyuy Dam complex to generate power needed for the diamond concentrators.

== Geography ==
The Vilyuy has its sources in the Vilyuy Plateau, part of the Central Siberian Plateau, in the Evenkiysky District (Krasnoyarsk Krai) and, flowing east, soon enters Sakha. It turns towards the south and southeast in the Central Yakutian Lowland, then back towards the east, and finally enters the Lena about 350 kilometres (220 mi) downstream of Yakutsk, near Sangar. The Ust-Vilyuy Range rises above the facing bank of the Lena, opposite the mouth of the Vilyuy.

To the west of the Vilyuy and Chona is the Nizhnyaya Tunguska basin. The Vilyuy basin is sparsely populated. Small settlements along the river include Vilyuysk, Verkhnevilyuysk, Suntar, Ekonda and Nyurba.

=== Tributaries ===
The main tributaries of the Vilyuy are the Ulakhan-Vava, Chirkuo, Chona, Chybyda, Ulakhan-Botuobuya, Ochchuguy-Botuobuya, Tangnary, Kempendyay, Tonguo and Bappagay on the right; and the Sen, Lakharchana, Akhtaranda, Ygyatta, Markha, Tyukyan, and Tyung on the left.

== Geology ==
Vilyuy is associated with geological formations Yakutsk-Vilyuy Rift (Vilyuy Rift Basin) and Yakutsk-Vilyuy LIP (large igneous province), also known as Vilyuy Traps.

== See also ==
- List of rivers of Russia
- Tukulan, sand dunes
- Late Devonian extinction#Volcanism
