= Svetly, Sakha Republic =

Svetly Светлый
- Urban-type settlement

Other transcription(s)
  - Yakut: Сибиэтлэй
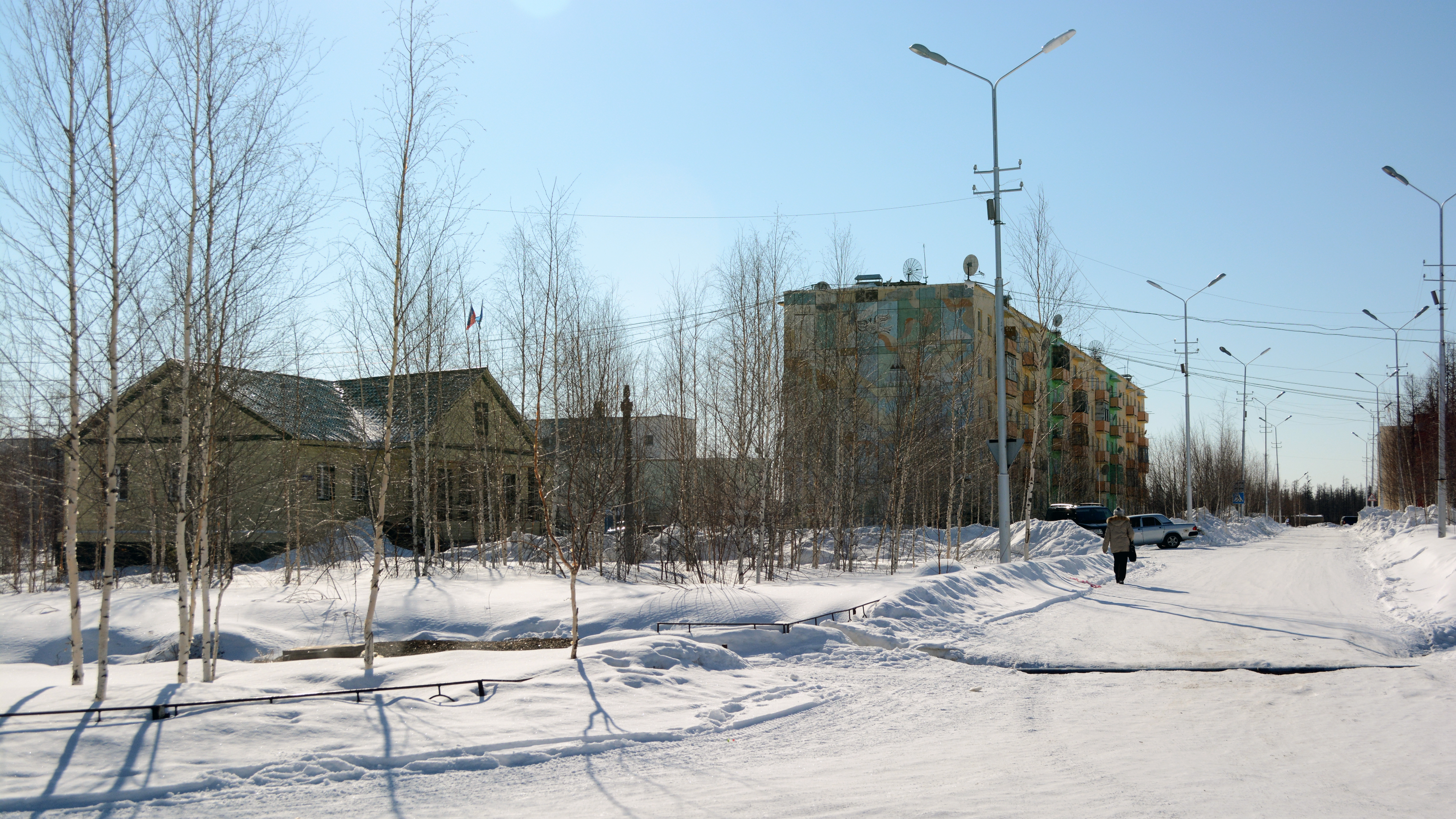
- In Svetly
- Interactive map of Svetly
- Location of Svetly Svetly (Sakha Republic)
- Coordinates: 63°03′N 113°27′E
- Country: Russia
- Federal subject: Sakha Republic
- Administrative district: Mirninsky District
- SettlementSelsoviet: Svetly
- Founded: 1970s
- Urban-type settlement status since: 1984

Population (2010 Census)
  - Total: 3,137
  - Estimate (2023): 2,981 (−5%)

Administrative status
  - Capital of: Settlement of Svetly

Municipal status
  - Municipal district: Mirninsky Municipal District
  - Urban settlement: Svetly Urban Settlement
  - Capital of: Svetly Urban Settlement
- Time zone: UTC+
- Postal code: 678196
- OKTMO ID: 98631157051

Svetly population
- 2010 Census: 3,137
- 2002 Census: 3,546
- 1989 Census: 4,550

Svetly (Russian: Све́тлый, lit light, clear; Yakut: Сибиэтлэй, Sibietley) is an urban locality (an urban-type settlement) in Mirninsky District of the Sakha Republic, Russia, located 75 kilometers (47 mi) from Mirny, the administrative center of the district, on the southern edge of the Vilyuy Plateau (a part of the Central Siberian Plateau), not far from the right bank of the Vilyuy River. As of the 2010 Census, its population was 3,137.

== History ==
It was founded in the late 1970s as a works base for construction of a dam and hydroelectric plant, downstream of the larger Vilyuy Dam. With the economic difficulties in the Soviet Union during the 1980s and in Russia during the 1990s, completion of the project was greatly delayed with the hydroelectric plant only beginning power generation between 2004 and 2008, with three of the four planned turbines in operation.

Urban-type settlement status was granted to Svetly in 1984.

== Administrative and municipal status ==
Within the framework of administrative divisions, the urban-type settlement of Svetly is incorporated within Mirninsky District as the Settlement of Svetly. As a municipal division, the Settlement of Svetly is incorporated within Mirninsky Municipal District as Svetly Urban Settlement.

== Economy ==
Vilyuyskaya GES-3 hydroelectric plant, with a capacity of 270 MW, is the principal employer. The power plant is managed by a daughter company of diamond mining corporation ALROSA. Many of the settlement's inhabitants also commute for week-by-week shift work in remote diamond mines or in construction projects throughout the western region of the Sakha Republic, including the Eastern Siberia–Pacific Ocean oil pipeline.

Svetly is connected by a 33-kilometer (21 mi) road with the Anabar Highway between Mirny and Chernyshevsky. The Evenk village of Syuldyukar lies 25 kilometers (16 mi) downstream along the Vilyuy and can be reached by boat in summer or via winter roads when the river is frozen.
