= Chernyshevsky (disambiguation) =

Nikolay Chernyshevsky (1828–1889) was a Russian revolutionary democrat, philosopher, critic, and socialist.

Chernyshevsky (masculine), Chernyshevskaya (feminine), or Chernyshevskoye (neuter) may also refer to:

- Chernyshevsky District, a district of Zabaykalsky Krai, Russia
- Chernyshevsky Urban Settlement, a municipal formation which the Settlement of Chernyshevsky in Mirninsky District of the Sakha Republic, Russia is incorporated as
- Chernyshevskoye Urban Settlement, a municipal formation which the urban-type settlement of Chernyshevsk in Chernyshevsky District of Zabaykalsky Krai is incorporated as
- Chernyshevsky (inhabited locality) (Chernyshevskaya, Chernyshevskoye), several inhabited localities in Russia
- Chernyshevskaya, a station of the Saint Petersburg Metro, Saint Petersburg, Russia
