= Larisa Popugayeva =

Soviet geologist

Larisa Popugayeva OL
- Born: Larisa Anatolyevna Popugayeva; 3 September 1923; Kaluga, USSR
- Died: 19 September 1977 (aged 54); Leningrad, USSR
- Education: Leningrad State University
- Occupation: geologist

Larisa Anatolyevna Popugayeva (Russian: Лари́са Анато́льевна Попуга́ева, IPA: [ɫɐˈrʲisə ɐnɐˈtolʲjɪvnə pəpʊˈɡa(j)ɪvə]; lit. 'Larisa Anatolyevna Popugaeva'; September 3, 1923 – September 19, 1977) was a Soviet geologist, candidate of geological and mineralogical sciences (1970), one of the discoverers of diamond deposits in the USSR.

== Biography ==
Larisa was born on September 3, 1923, in Kaluga. Her father, Anatoly Grintsevich, secretary of the Prigorodny District Party Committee in Odessa, was shot in 1937. Mother, Olga Grintsevich, is a Leningrad art critic.

In 1937, after the death of her father, together with her mother and born in Odessa, her sister Irina, Larisa returned to Leningrad. In 1941 she graduated from the school and entered the Leningrad University.

Larisa Grincevich met the Great Patriotic War in Moscow, where she, together with other alumni excellent students from Leningrad schools was sent on a special voucher to the All-Union agricultural exhibition. At the beginning of the war, this group was left indefinitely in Moscow. Meanwhile, Larisa's mother and sister left for the Ural evacuation.

In September 1941, Larisa arrived in Molotov, where her mother and four-year-old sister were evacuated. Was enrolled in the Molotov University (now Perm State University). She graduated from nursing courses, worked in the clinic. Then she graduated from the courses of machine gunners.

From April 1942 to July 1945, was a volunteer in the Air Defense Division of Moscow, the commander of the gun crew, was promoted to the rank of junior sergeant.

In 1950 she graduated from the Department of Mineralogy of the Leningrad University. Simultaneously with her studies she worked for three years as a geologist-explorer in various expeditions of the North-Western Geological Administration.

Already in 1950, her work in the north of the Irkutsk region was linked to diamonds. In the summer of 1951 she was on an expedition in the Subpolar Urals. In 1952, Larisa married a LISI teacher Viktor Popugayev.

In June 1954, Larisa Popugayeva and her assistant Fedor Belikov discovered a kimberlite surface in Yakutia, following two months of labor intensive searches along the shores of the Daldyn River. This discovery, the first of its kind on USSR territory, was later called the Zarnitsa mine. The following year, another 10 pipes were opened in this locality.

Larisa Popugayeva died on September 19, 1977, from occlusion and aortic rupture.

== Memory ==
Larisa Popugayeva's name is given to a diamond weighing 29.4 carats (about 12 mm across). Streets in the diamond cities of Udachny and Aykhal bear her name. In Yakutia, in the town of Udachny, a monument to Larisa Popugayeva is erected.

== Awards ==
- Medal For the Victory over Germany in the Great Patriotic War 1941–1945 (1945)
- Order of Lenin (1957)
