= Zarya, Sakha Republic =

Zarya Заря
- Selo
- Interactive map of Zarya
- Location of Zarya Zarya (Sakha Republic)
- Coordinates: 62°06′N 114°13′E
- Country: Russia
- Federal subject: Sakha Republic
- Administrative district: Mirninsky District
- Rural okrugSelsoviet: Chuoninsky Rural Okrug
- Founded: 1957
- Elevation: 286 m (938 ft)

Population (2010 Census)
  - Total: 242
  - Estimate (2021): 103 (−57.4%)

Municipal status
  - Municipal district: Mirninsky Municipal District
  - Rural settlement: Chuoninsky Rural Settlement
- Time zone: UTC+
- Postal code: 678180
- OKTMO ID: 98631450106

Zarya (Russian: Заря́) was a rural locality (a selo) in Chuoninsky Rural Okrug of Mirninsky District in the Sakha Republic, Russia, located 56 kilometers (35 mi) from Mirny, the administrative center of the district, and 35 kilometers (22 mi) from Arylakh, the administrative center of the rural okrug. Its population as of the 2010 Census was 0; down from 562 recorded during the 2002 Census.
