= Almazny =

Almazny (masculine), Almaznaya (feminine), or Almaznoye (neuter) may refer to:

- Almazny Urban Settlement, a municipal formation into which the urban-type settlement of Almazny in Mirninsky District of the Sakha Republic, Russia is incorporated
- Almazny, Russia (Almaznaya, Almaznoye), several inhabited localities in Russia
- Sameh Almazny, engineering assistant who participated in the production of the Pandemonium album by the English rock group Killing Joke
- Almaznaya, alternative name of Almazna, a town in Luhansk Oblast, Ukraine
- Almaznaya, alternative name of Almazna coal mine in Donetsk Oblast, Ukraine
