= Berezovka, Mirninsky District, Sakha Republic =

Berezovka Березовка
- Selo
- Interactive map of Berezovka
- Location of Berezovka Berezovka (Sakha Republic)
- Coordinates: 62°27′15″N 114°08′02″E
- Country: Russia
- Federal subject: Sakha Republic
- Administrative district: Mirninsky District
- SettlementSelsoviet: Almazny
- Elevation: 289 m (948 ft)

Population (2010 Census)
  - Total: 11
  - Estimate (2021): 5 (−54.5%)

Municipal status
  - Municipal district: Mirninsky Municipal District
  - Urban settlement: Almazny Urban Settlement
- Time zone: UTC+
- Postal code: 678170
- OKTMO ID: 98631101106

Berezovka (Russian: Березовка) is a rural locality (a selo) under the administrative jurisdiction of the Settlement of Almazny in Mirninsky District of the Sakha Republic, Russia, located 9 kilometers (5.6 mi) from Mirny, the administrative center of the district, and 11 kilometers (6.8 mi) from Almazny. Its population as of the 2010 Census was 11; down from 20 recorded during the 2002 Census.
