= Polyarny (inhabited locality) =

Polyarny (Russian: Поля́рный; masculine), Polyarnaya (Поля́рная; feminine), or Polyarnoye (Поля́рное; neuter) is the name of several inhabited localities in Russia.

Urban localities

- Polyarny, Murmansk Oblast, a town under the administrative jurisdiction of the closed administrative-territorial formation of Alexandrovsk, Murmansk Oblast

Rural localities

- Polyarny, Sakha Republic, a selo under the administrative jurisdiction of Udachny Town Under District Jurisdiction, Mirninsky District, Sakha Republic

Historical inhabited localities

- Polyarny, Chukotka Autonomous Okrug, a former urban-type settlement in Chukotka Autonomous Okrug; abolished in 1995

Renamed inhabited localities

- Polyarnoye, former name of the selo of Russkoye Ustye, Sakha Republic
