= Chernyshevsky (inhabited locality) =

Chernyshevsky (Russian: Черныше́вский; masculine), Chernyshevskaya (Черныше́вская; feminine), or Chernyshevskoye (Черныше́вское; neuter) is the name of several inhabited localities in Russia:

Urban localities

- Chernyshevsky, Sakha Republic, an urban-type settlement in Mirninsky District of the Sakha Republic

Rural localities

- Chernyshevsky, Altai Krai, a settlement in Mokhovskoy Selsoviet of Aleysky District of Altai Krai
- Chernyshevsky, Chelyabinsk Oblast, a settlement in Novopokrovsky Selsoviet of Kizilsky District of Chelyabinsk Oblast
- Chernyshevsky, Kursk Oblast, a khutor in Verkhnekhotemlsky Selsoviet of Fatezhsky District of Kursk Oblast
- Chernyshevsky, Novosibirsk Oblast, a settlement in Tatarsky District of Novosibirsk Oblast
- Chernyshevskoye, a settlement in Prigorodny Rural Okrug of Nesterovsky District of Kaliningrad Oblast
