= Maiskoye diamond mine =

Diamond mine in Russia

Maiskoye mine
- Location within Sakha Republic Location within Russia
- Location: Nyurbinsky District, Sakha Republic, Russia; 64°58′44″N 117°00′40″E
- Products: diamonds
- Type: open-pit
- Discovered: 2006
- Company: ALROSA

The Maiskoye mine is one of the largest diamond mines in Russia and in the world. The mine is located in the Sakha Republic, in the Nyurba open pit. The mine has estimated reserves of 13.3 million carats of diamonds and an annual production capacity of 0.8 million carats.

Zaitsev et al. (2010) and Smelov et al. (2009, 2010) named this kimberlite field Khompu-Maiskoye. The field consists of 4, Middle-Paleozoic kimberlite bodies. The first crystal diamond was found in 2012.

Development of the mine was planned to start in 2022. In 2024, the company Shakhtoupravleniye Maiskoye was sanctioned by the US Department of State for its ties with the SDS UGOL.

== See also ==
- List of mines in Russia
- Butuobinskaya diamond mine (Nyurba open pit)
- Nurbinskaya diamond mine (Nyurba open pit)
