= Aykhal =

Aykhal Айхал
- Urban-type settlement

Other transcription(s)
  - Yakut: Айхал
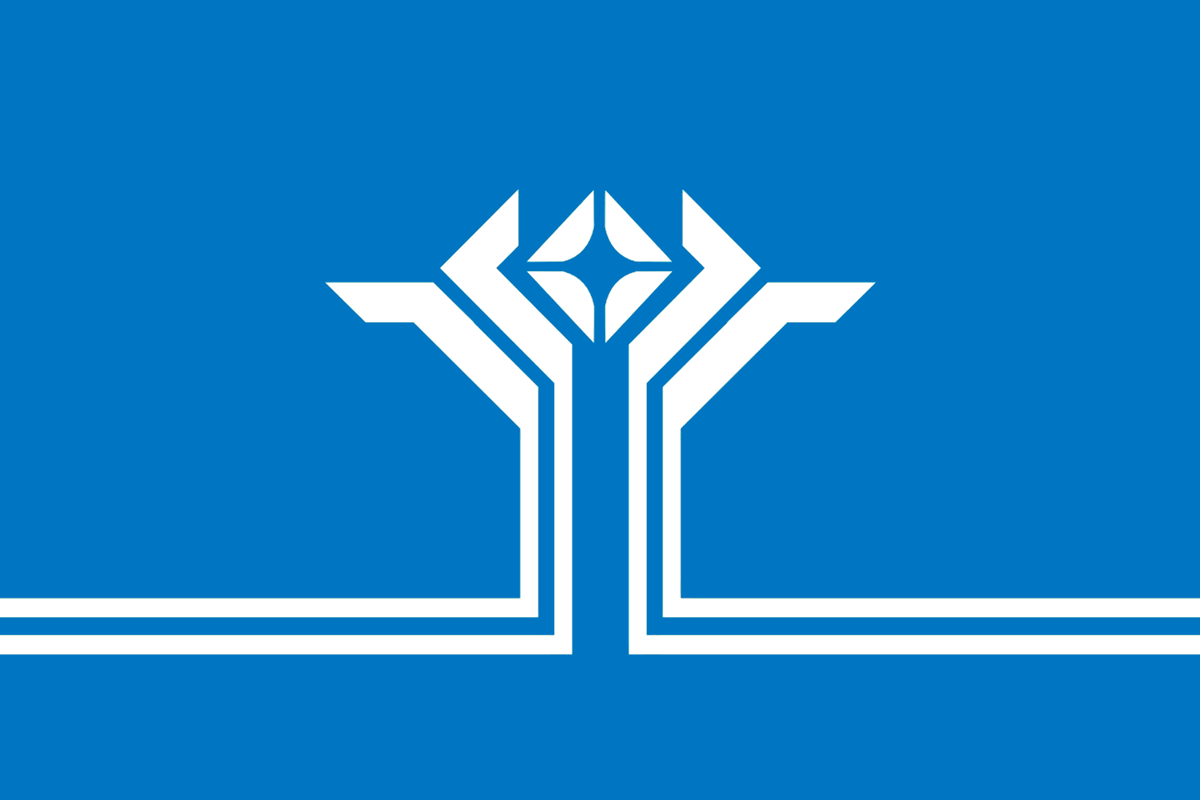
- Flag
- Interactive map of Aykhal
- Location of Aykhal Aykhal (Sakha Republic)
- Coordinates: 65°56′N 111°30′E
- Country: Russia
- Federal subject: Sakha Republic
- Administrative district: Mirninsky District
- SettlementSelsoviet: Settlement of Aykhal
- Founded: 1961
- Urban-type settlement status since: 1962
- Elevation: 514 m (1,686 ft)

Population (2010 Census)
  - Total: 13,727
  - Estimate (2023): 13,359 (−2.7%)

Administrative status
  - Capital of: Settlement of Aykhal

Municipal status
  - Municipal district: Mirninsky Municipal District
  - Urban settlement: Aykhal Urban Settlement
  - Capital of: Aykhal Urban Settlement
- Time zone: UTC+
- Postal codes: 678190, 678191
- OKTMO ID: 98631152051

Aykhal population
- 2010 Census: 13,727
- 2002 Census: 15,782
- 1989 Census: 11,552
- 1979 Census: 5,440

Aykhal (Russian: Айха́л; Yakut: Айхал, Ayxal) is an urban locality (an urban-type settlement) in Mirninsky District of the Sakha Republic, Russia, located 469 kilometers (291 mi) from Mirny, the administrative center of the district, in the basin of the Vilyuy River. As of the 2010 Census, its population was 13,727.

Historical population
Year	Pop.	±%
1970	5,386	—
1979	5,440	+1.0%
1989	11,552	+112.4%
2002	15,782	+36.6%
2010	13,727	−13.0%
2021	13,370	−2.6%
Source: Census data

== Etymology ==
The name derives from the Yakut word for fame.

== Geography ==
Sokhsolookh stream is located in the Aykhal's vicinity. The name of the stream in the Yakut language means the river of death or the river of traps, in reference to a large number of reindeer who, according to local legend, have drowned while trying to cross the river ice.

=== Climate ===
Climate data for Yubileynaya (1991–2020, extremes 1936–present)
Month	Jan	Feb	Mar	Apr	May	Jun	Jul	Aug	Sep	Oct	Nov	Dec	Year
Record high °C (°F)	−8.7 (16.3)	−2.2 (28.0)	2.4 (36.3)	9.4 (48.9)	26.6 (79.9)	33.2 (91.8)	35.3 (95.5)	30.7 (87.3)	22.6 (72.7)	6.9 (44.4)	0.5 (32.9)	−7.1 (19.2)	35.3 (95.5)
Mean daily maximum °C (°F)	−30.8 (−23.4)	−30.0 (−22.0)	−21.6 (−6.9)	−10.0 (14.0)	0.9 (33.6)	13.6 (56.5)	17.2 (63.0)	14.3 (57.7)	5.8 (42.4)	−8.0 (17.6)	−21.9 (−7.4)	−29.1 (−20.4)	−8.3 (17.1)
Daily mean °C (°F)	−34.1 (−29.4)	−33.4 (−28.1)	−26.5 (−15.7)	−15.9 (3.4)	−3.6 (25.5)	8.0 (46.4)	11.7 (53.1)	9.5 (49.1)	2.3 (36.1)	−11.0 (12.2)	−25.3 (−13.5)	−32.4 (−26.3)	−12.6 (9.4)
Mean daily minimum °C (°F)	−37.3 (−35.1)	−36.6 (−33.9)	−30.8 (−23.4)	−21.2 (−6.2)	−7.4 (18.7)	3.8 (38.8)	7.6 (45.7)	5.9 (42.6)	−0.3 (31.5)	−14.0 (6.8)	−28.6 (−19.5)	−35.6 (−32.1)	−16.2 (2.8)
Record low °C (°F)	−55.4 (−67.7)	−55.2 (−67.4)	−49.7 (−57.5)	−46.3 (−51.3)	−28.1 (−18.6)	−10.5 (13.1)	−1.8 (28.8)	−4.2 (24.4)	−15.0 (5.0)	−36.9 (−34.4)	−47.6 (−53.7)	−52.9 (−63.2)	−55.4 (−67.7)
Average precipitation mm (inches)	11 (0.4)	10 (0.4)	8 (0.3)	7 (0.3)	15 (0.6)	21 (0.8)	33 (1.3)	27 (1.1)	25 (1.0)	19 (0.7)	17 (0.7)	12 (0.5)	205 (8.1)
Source: pogodaiklimat.ru

== History ==
It was founded in 1961 with the beginnings of diamond extraction from the kimberlite pipe found here. It was granted urban-type settlement status in the following year. In 1985, Yubileynaya diamond mine was opened 20 kilometers (12 mi) from Aykhal.

== Administrative and municipal status ==
Within the framework of administrative divisions, the urban-type settlement of Aykhal, together with one rural locality (the selo of Morkoka), is incorporated within Mirninsky District as the Settlement of Aykhal. As a municipal division, the Settlement of Aykhal is incorporated within Mirninsky Municipal District as Aykhal Urban Settlement.

== Economy and infrastructure ==
The local economy is reliant on diamond mining conducted by ALROSA at its Aykhal and Yubileynaya mines. It is served by the Aykhal Airport.
