= Morkoka =

Morkoka Моркока
- Selo
- Interactive map of Morkoka
- Location of Morkoka Morkoka (Sakha Republic)
- Coordinates: 64°36′N 112°32′E
- Country: Russia
- Federal subject: Sakha Republic
- Administrative district: Mirninsky District
- SettlementSelsoviet: Aykhal

Population (2010 Census)
  - Total: 76
  - Estimate (2023): 0 (−100%)

Municipal status
  - Municipal district: Mirninsky Municipal District
  - Urban settlement: Aykhal Urban Settlement
- Time zone: UTC+
- Postal code: 678171
- OKTMO ID: 98631152106

Morkoka (Russian: Моркока) is a rural locality (a selo) under the administrative jurisdiction of the Settlement of Aykhal in Mirninsky District of the Sakha Republic, Russia, located 291 kilometers (181 mi) from Mirny, the administrative center of the district, and 178 kilometers (111 mi) from Aykhal. Its population as of the 2010 Census was 76, down from 93 recorded during the 2002 Census.
