= Almazny, Russia =

Almazny (Russian: Алмазный; masculine), Almaznaya (Алмазная; feminine), or Almaznoye (Алмазное; neuter) is the name of several inhabited localities in Russia.

== Modern localities ==
- Almazny, Sakha Republic, an urban locality (an urban-type settlement) in Mirninsky District of the Sakha Republic
- Almaznoye, a rural locality (a selo) in Sovetsky District of the Republic of Crimea

== Abolished localities ==
- Almazny, Rostov Oblast, a former urban-type settlement in Rostov Oblast; now a part of the town of Gukovo
