= Novy, Mirninsky District, Sakha Republic =

Novy Новый
- Selo
- Interactive map of Novy
- Location of Novy Novy (Sakha Republic)
- Coordinates: 62°25′19″N 114°21′19″E
- Country: Russia
- Federal subject: Sakha Republic
- Administrative district: Mirninsky District
- SettlementSelsoviet: Almazny
- Founded: 1954

Population (2010 Census)
  - Total: 76
  - Estimate (2021): 71 (−6.6%)

Municipal status
  - Municipal district: Mirninsky Municipal District
  - Urban settlement: Almazny Urban Settlement
- Time zone: UTC+
- Postal code: 678181
- OKTMO ID: 98631155111

Novy (Russian: Но́вый) is a rural locality (a selo) under the administrative jurisdiction of the Settlement of Almazny in Mirninsky District of the Sakha Republic, Russia, located 25 kilometers (16 mi) from Mirny, the administrative center of the district and 5 kilometers (3.1 mi) from Almazny. Its population as of the 2010 Census was 76; down from 242 recorded during the 2002 Census.
