= Polyarny =

Polyarny (masculine), Polyarnaya (feminine), or Polyarnoye (neuter) may refer to:

- Polyarny (inhabited locality) (Polyarnaya, Polyarnoye), several inhabited localities in Russia
- Polyarny District (1927–1960), a former district of Murmansk Oblast, Russian SFSR, Soviet Union
- Polyarny Airport, in the Sakha Republic, Russia
- Polyarny, alternative name of the Russian Shipyard Number 10
