= Aykhal diamond mine =

Russian diamond mine

Aykhal mine
- Location within Sakha Republic Location within Russia

Location
- Location: Mirninsky District, Sakha Republic, Russia; 65°55′37″N 111°29′50″E

Production
- Products: diamonds
- Type: open-pit then underground

History
- Discovered: 1960
- Opened: 1961

Owner
- Company: ALROSA

The Aykhal mine (Yakut: Айха́л, IPA: [ɐɪ̯ˈxaɫ]; lit. 'Glory') is one of the largest diamond mines in Russia and in the world. The mine is located in the north-eastern part of the country in the Sakha Republic, near the settlement of Aykhal. The mine has estimated reserves of 40.7 million carats of diamonds and an annual production capacity of 1.3 million carats.

== See also ==
- List of mines in Russia
- Yubileynaya diamond mine
