= Dalnyaya diamond mine =

Diamond mine in Russia

Dalnyaya mine
- Location within Sakha Republic Location within Russia
- Location: Mirninsky District, Sakha Republic, Russia; 66°13′23″N 112°28′36″E
- Products: diamonds
- Discovered: 1955

The Dalnyaya mine (Russian: Да́льняя, IPA: [ˈdalʲnʲɪɪ̯ə]; lit. 'Distant') is one of the largest diamond mines in Russia and in the world. The mine is located in the Sakha Republic. The mine has estimated reserves of 10.2 million carats of diamonds and an annual production capacity of 0.5 million carats.

== See also ==
- List of mines in Russia
- Udachnaya Pipe
- Zarnitsa mine
