= Yubileynaya diamond mine =

Diamond mine in Sakha, Russia

Yubileynaya mine
- Location within Sakha Republic Location within Russia
- Location: Mirninsky District, Sakha Republic, Russia; 66°0′1″N 111°13′54″E
- Products: diamonds
- Type: open-pit
- Discovered: 1975
- Opened: 1990
- Company: ALROSA

The Yubileynaya mine (Russian: Юбиле́йная, IPA: [jʉbʲɪˈlʲeɪ̯nəɪ̯ə]; lit. 'Jubilee') is one of the largest diamond mines in Russia and in the world. The mine is located in the north-eastern part of the country in the Sakha Republic., 20 kilometers from the settlement of Aykhal. The mine has estimated reserves of 170.6 million carats of diamonds and an annual production capacity of 3.6 million carats.

In 2013, a large 235.17 carat diamond was mined in the quarry of the Yubileynaya pipe, named after the three hundredth and eightieth anniversary of the founding of the town of Vilyuysk.

== See also ==
- List of mines in Russia
- Aykhal diamond mine
