= Zarnitsa mine =

Russian diamond mine

- Location in Russia Zarnitsa Mine (Russia)
- Location: Mirninsky District,Sakha Republic, Russia; 66°25′34″N 112°40′26″E
- Products: diamonds
- Type: open-pit
- Discovered: 1954
- Opened: 1998
- Company: ALROSA

The Zarnitsa mine (Russian: Зарни́ца, IPA: [zɐrˈnʲit͡sə]; lit. 'Lightning') was the first kimberlite diamond pipe discovered in Russia. It is located in the Daldyn-Alakit kimberlite field, in the watershed of two small streams that flow into the Daldyn River, in the north-eastern part of the country in the Sakha Republic.

It was discovered on August 21, 1954, by geologists Natalya Sarsadskikh (Наталья Сарсадских) and Larisa Popugayeva, although their priority was recognized only in 1970 for Popugayeva and in 1990 for Sarsadskikh. Initially the Zarnitsa mine was underestimated and the Mir mine discovered on 13 June 1955 was developed first, until Zarnitsa was re-evaluated in the early 1980s and recognized as developable. It has been working at full capacity since the early 2000s and is now one of the largest diamond mines in Russia and in the world. The mine has estimated reserves of 52 million carats of diamonds and an annual production capacity of 0.2 million carats.

In 2006, a large 207.29 carat diamond was mined in the quarry of the Zarnitsa pipe, and named after the Russian theatrical and artistic figure Sergei Diaghilev.

== See also ==
- List of mines in Russia
- Dalnyaya diamond mine
- Udachnaya Pipe
