= Aykhal Airport =

Airport in Russia

Aykhal Airport Айхал аэропорт
- IATA: -; ICAO: UERA; LID: АХЛ

Summary
- Airport type: Public
- Location: Aykhal
- Coordinates: 65°57′33″N 111°32′47″E
- Interactive map of Aykhal Airport
- Source: Our Airports web site

Aykhal Airport is a public airport in the Sakha Republic, Russia, serving the settlement of Aykhal.

== See also ==
- List of airports in Russia
