= Nurbinskaya diamond mine =

Russian diamond mine

Nurbinskaya mine
- Location within Sakha Republic Location within Russia
- Location: Nyurbinsky District, Sakha Republic, Russia; 65°01′32″N 117°04′52″E
- Products: diamonds
- Type: open-pit
- Discovered: 1996
- Opened: 2002
- Company: ALROSA

The Nurbinskaya mine is one of the largest diamond mines in Russia and in the world. The mine is located in the north-eastern part of the country in the Sakha Republic. The mine has estimated reserves of 67.8 million carats of diamonds and an annual production capacity of 6.95 million carats.

== See also ==
- List of mines in Russia
- Butuobinskaya diamond mine
- Maiskoye diamond mine
