= Udachnaya pipe =

Diamond mine in Sakha Republic, Russia

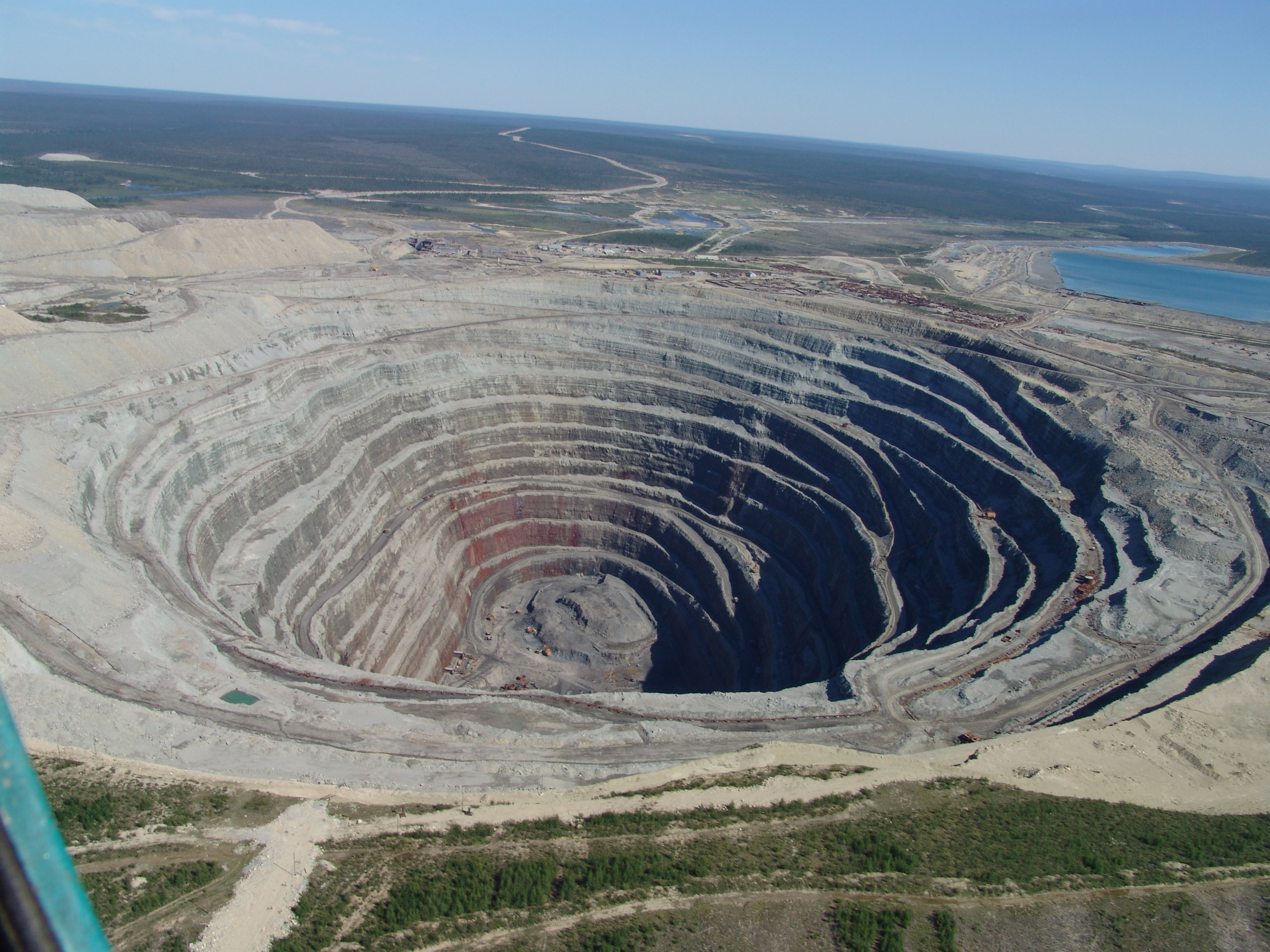
- The Udachnaya pipe

- Location in Sakha Republic, Russia Udachnaya pipe (Russia)
- Location: Mirninsky District, Sakha Republic, Russia; 66°26′03″N 112°19′03″E
- Products: diamonds
- Type: open-pit then underground
- Discovered: 1955
- Opened: 1971
- Company: ALROSA

The Udachnaya pipe (Russian: Уда́чная, IPA: [ʊˈdat͡ɕnəɪ̯ə]; lit. 'Lucky') is a diamond deposit in the Daldyn-Alakit kimberlite field in Sakha Republic, Russia. It is an open-pit mine, and is located just outside the Arctic Circle at 66°26′N 112°19′E.

== History ==
Udachnaya was discovered on 15 June 1955, just two days after the discovery of the diamond pipe Mir by Soviet geologist Vladimir Shchukin and his team. It is about 640 metres (2,100 ft) deep, making it the third deepest open-pit mine in the world (after Bingham Canyon Mine and Chuquicamata).

The nearby settlement of Udachny is named for the deposit.

As of 2010, Udachnaya pipe is controlled by Russian diamond company Alrosa, which planned to halt open-pit mining in favor of underground mining in 2010.

The mine has estimated reserves of 225.8 million carats (45.16 t) of diamonds and an annual production capacity of 10.4 million carats (2.08 t).

== See also ==
- List of mines in Russia
- Dalnyaya diamond mine
- Zarnitsa mine
