= Arylakh, Mirninsky District, Sakha Republic =

Arylakh Арылах
- Selo
- Interactive map of Arylakh
- Location of Arylakh Arylakh (Sakha Republic)
- Coordinates: 62°22′56″N 114°21′33″E
- Country: Russia
- Federal subject: Sakha Republic
- Administrative district: Mirninsky District
- Rural okrugSelsoviet: Chuoninsky Rural Okrug

Population (2010 Census)
  - Total: 1,570
  - Estimate (2021): 1,564 (−0.4%)

Administrative status
  - Capital of: Chuoninsky Rural Okrug

Municipal status
  - Municipal district: Mirninsky Municipal District
  - Rural settlement: Chuoninsky Rural Settlement
  - Capital of: Chuoninsky Rural Settlement
- Time zone: UTC+
- Postal code: 678183
- OKTMO ID: 98631450101

Arylakh (Russian: Арылах; Yakut: Арыылаах, Arıılaax) is a rural locality (a selo) and the administrative center of Chuoninsky Rural Okrug of Mirninsky District in the Sakha Republic, Russia, located 31 kilometers (19 mi) from Mirny, the administrative center of the district. Its population as of the 2010 Census was 1,570; down from 1,666 recorded during the 2002 Census.
