= Verkhne-Munskoye diamond mine =

Diamond mine in Sakha, Russia

Verkhne-Munskoye mine
- Location within Sakha Republic Location within Russia
- Location: Olenyoksky District, Sakha Republic, Russia; 67°15′03″N 115°03′03″E
- Products: diamonds
- Type: open-pit
- Discovered: 1956
- Opened: 2018
- Company: ALROSA

The Verkhne-Munskoye mine is one of the largest diamond mines in Russia and in the world. The mine is located in the Sakha Republic. The mine has estimated reserves of 40 million carats of diamonds and an annual production capacity of 1.8 million carats.

== See also ==
- List of mines in Russia
