= Polyarny, Sakha Republic =

Polyarny Полярный
- Selo
- Interactive map of Polyarny
- Location of Polyarny Polyarny (Sakha Republic)
- Coordinates: 66°24′42″N 112°07′45″E
- Country: Russia
- Federal subject: Sakha Republic
- Administrative district: Mirninsky District
- TownSelsoviet: Udachny

Population (2010 Census)
  - Total: 0
  - Estimate (2021): 0 )

Municipal status
  - Municipal district: Mirninsky Municipal District
  - Urban settlement: Udachny Urban Settlement
- Time zone: UTC+
- Postal code: 678195
- OKTMO ID: 98631109106

Polyarny (Russian: Полярный) is a rural locality (a selo), one of two settlements, in addition to Udachny, the administrative centre of the Town, in the Town of Udachny of Mirninsky District in the Sakha Republic, Russia. It is located 536 kilometers (333 mi) from Mirny, the administrative center of the district and 9 kilometers (5.6 mi) from Udachny. Its population as of the 2010 Census was 0; down from 429 recorded during the 2002 Census.
