= Almazny, Sakha Republic =

Almazny Алмазный
- Urban-type settlement

Other transcription(s)
  - Yakut: Алмазнай
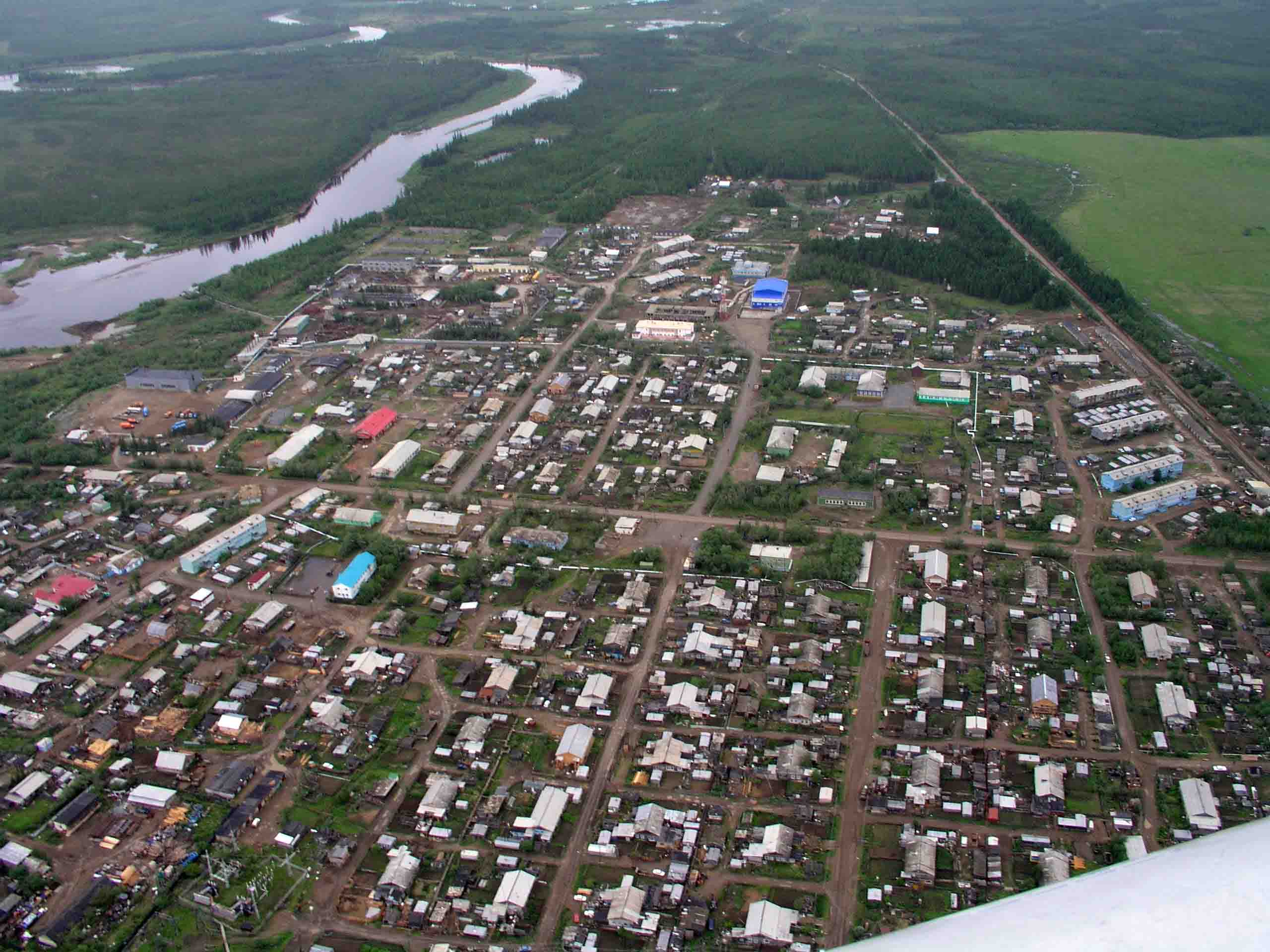

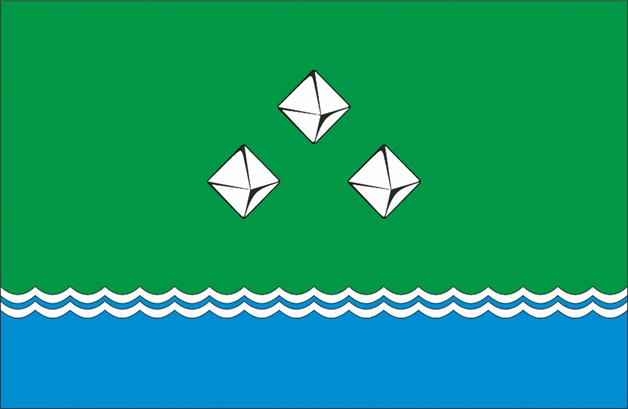
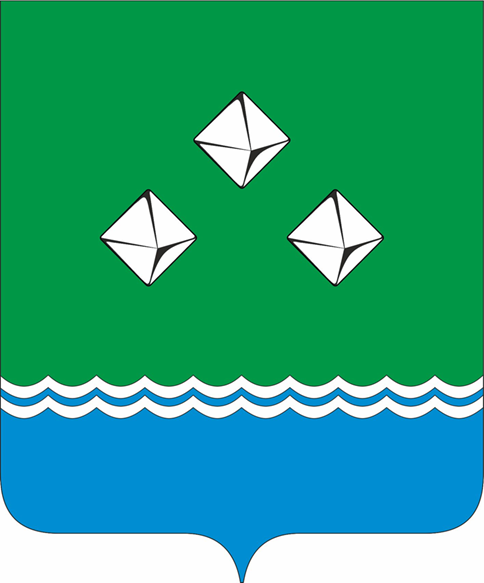
- Flag Coat of arms
- Interactive map of Almazny
- Location of Almazny Almazny (Sakha Republic)
- Coordinates: 62°27′N 114°20′E
- Country: Russia
- Federal subject: Sakha Republic
- Administrative district: Mirninsky District
- SettlementSelsoviet: Settlement of Almazny
- Founded: 1960
- Urban-type settlement status since: 1962
- Elevation: 262 m (860 ft)

Population (2010 Census)
  - Total: 1,527
  - Estimate (2023): 1,598 (+4.6%)

Administrative status
  - Capital of: Settlement of Almazny

Municipal status
  - Municipal district: Mirninsky Municipal District
  - Urban settlement: Almazny Urban Settlement
  - Capital of: Almazny Urban Settlement
- Time zone: UTC+
- Postal code: 678181
- OKTMO ID: 98631155051

Almazny population
- 2010 Census: 1,527
- 2002 Census: 1,756
- 1989 Census: 1,976
- 1979 Census: 1,887

Almazny (Russian: Алма́зный; Yakut: Алмазнай) is an urban locality (an urban-type settlement) in Mirninsky District of the Sakha Republic, Russia, located 20 kilometers (12 mi) from Mirny, the administrative center of the district, on the border of the Lena and Vilyuy Plateaus, on the Irelyakh River, at its confluence with the Ochchuguy-Botuobuya, a tributary of the Vilyuy. As of the 2010 Census, its population was 1,527.

== History ==
Diamond deposits were discovered in the area in 1954, in conjunction with which the nearby selo of Novy was founded in the same year. Almazny was founded in 1960 as a dormitory settlement for mine workers, and was granted urban-type settlement status in 1962.

== Administrative and municipal status ==
Within the framework of administrative divisions, the urban-type settlement of Almazny, together with two rural localities, is incorporated within Mirninsky District as the Settlement of Almazny. As a municipal division, the Settlement of Almazny is incorporated within Mirninsky Municipal District as Almazny Urban Settlement.

== Economy and infrastructure ==
Employment in Almazny centers on diamond extraction from placer deposits in the valley of the Irelyakh River, using three specially-built semi-stationary dredgers.

Almazny lies on the Vilyuy Highway, which connects the diamond mining town of Mirny with the republic capital of Yakutsk. The road junction to Aykhal and Udachny, which is planned to be expanded into the Anabar Highway and ultimately connect to the Arctic Ocean coast in the Anabar River region, is located 6 kilometers (3.7 mi) west of Almazny>
