= Butuobinskaya diamond mine =

Russian diamond mine

Butuobinskaya mine
- Location within Sakha Republic Location within Russia

Location
- Location: Nyurbinsky District, Sakha Republic, Russia; 65°00′05″N 117°03′17″E

Production
- Products: diamonds
- Type: open-pit

History
- Discovered: 1994
- Opened: 2015

Owner
- Company: ALROSA

The Butuobinskaya mine or Botuobinskaya mine is one of the largest diamond mines in Russia and in the world. The mine is located in the north-eastern part of the country in the Sakha Republic. The mine has estimated reserves of 93 million carats of diamonds and an annual production capacity of 0.2 million carats. In 2018, the mine produced 1.4 million carats. The mine is a short drive from another diamond mine, the Nurbinskaya diamond mine.

== See also ==
- List of mines in Russia
- Maiskoye diamond mine
- Nurbinskaya diamond mine
