= Syuldyukar =

Syuldyukar Сюльдюкар
- Selo
- Interactive map of Syuldyukar
- Location of Syuldyukar Syuldyukar (Sakha Republic)
- Coordinates: 63°13′39″N 113°43′41″E
- Country: Russia
- Federal subject: Sakha Republic
- Administrative district: Mirninsky District
- Rural okrugSelsoviet: Sadyinsky National Evenk Rural Okrug

Population (2010 Census)
  - Total: 318
  - Estimate (2021): 263 (−17.3%)

Administrative status
  - Capital of: Sadyinsky National Evenk Rural Okrug

Municipal status
  - Municipal district: Mirninsky Municipal District
  - Rural settlement: Sadyinsky National Evenk Rural Settlement
  - Capital of: Sadyinsky National Evenk Rural Settlement
- Time zone: UTC+
- Postal code: 678186
- OKTMO ID: 98631428101

Syuldyukar (Russian: Сюльдюкар; Yakut: Сүлдьүкээр, romanized: Sülcükeer) is a rural locality (a selo), the only inhabited locality, and the administrative center of Sadyinsky National Evenk Rural Okrug of Suntarsky District in the Sakha Republic, Russia, located 101 kilometers (63 mi) from Mirny, the administrative center of the district. Its population as of the 2010 Census was 318, down from 359 recorded during the 2002 Census.
