= Lake Ellen Kimberlite =

Geological formation

Coordinates: 46°10′29″N 88°10′36″W

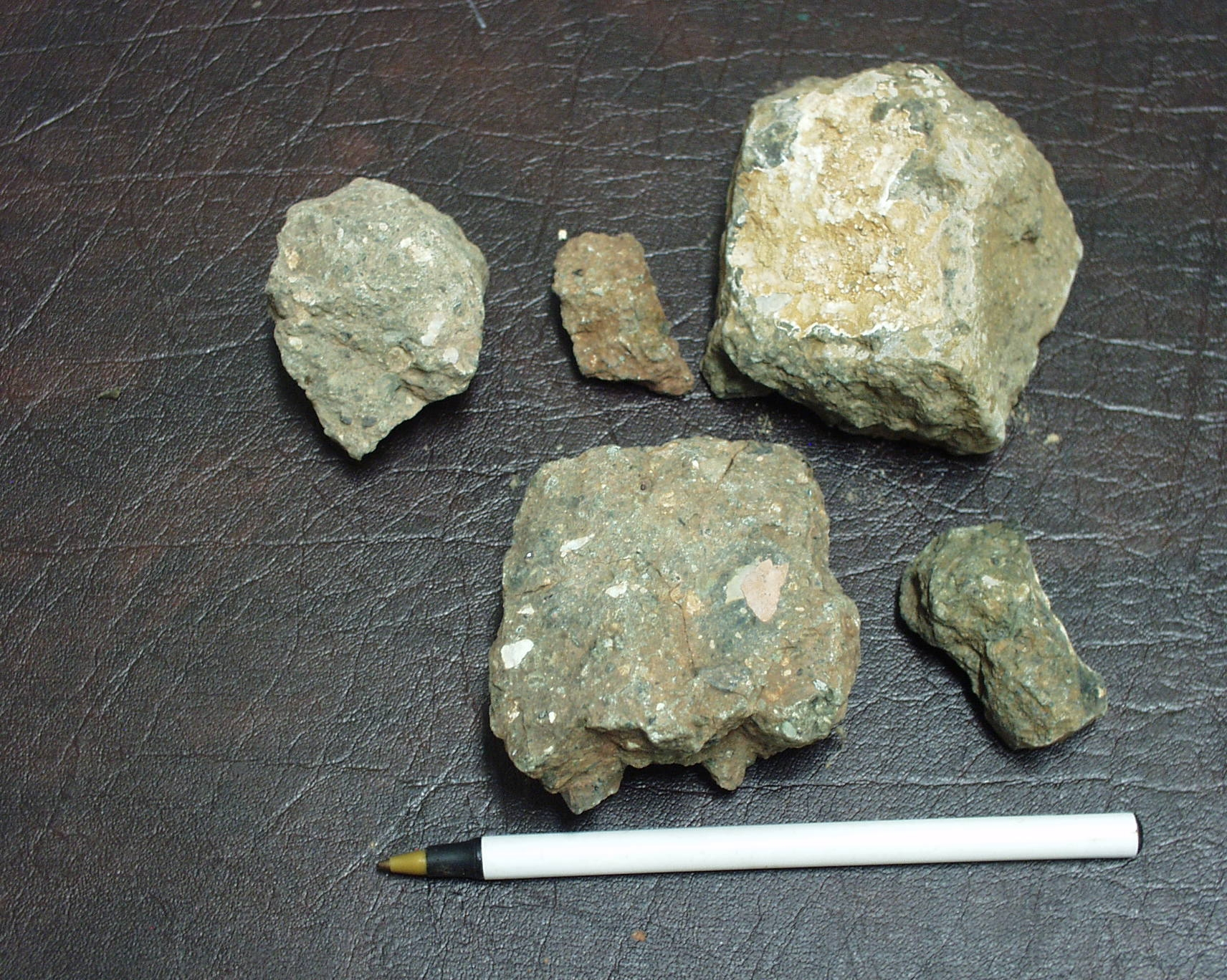
Typical weathered kimberlite from the Lake Ellen occurrence

Lake Ellen Kimberlite is a poorly exposed volcanic breccia located about 10 miles (16 km) northeast of Crystal Falls in the Upper Peninsula of Michigan. The first publication in 1981 describing the feature led to speculation that this or similar kimberlites in the area might have been the source of the diamonds discovered a century before in Wisconsin as well as a period of exploration by several minerals firms.

The kimberlite was discovered in 1971 when a logging road was bulldozed through the area exposing the unusual looking rock. The exposure consists of several small areas otherwise overlain by glacial till. Magnetic survey work done in 1956 depicts an elliptical positive anomaly 590 feet (180 m) long in an east–west direction and 390 feet (120 m) wide, which probably defines the limits of the pipe. The kimberlite is intruded into volcanic rocks of the Proterozoic Hemlock Formation. The exposed material is grayish green to reddish, iron-stained, highly weathered and consists of disaggregated rubbly fragments up to 10 inches (250 mm). It is generally accepted that the pipe was emplaced about 180 million years ago.

Lake Ellen Kimberlite is popular with rock hounds as the classic indicator minerals (pyrope, magnesian ilmenite and chrome diopside) for kimberlite are easily found in the material, though few are of gem quality and size. While there was considerable interest in diamond exploration in Michigan's Upper Peninsula and northern Wisconsin for several years, no diamonds of commercial interest have been found.

== See also ==
- Lamproite
- Elliott County Kimberlite
