= Chernyshevsky, Sakha Republic =

Chernyshevsky Чернышевский
- Urban-type settlement

Other transcription(s)
  - Yakut: Чернышевскай
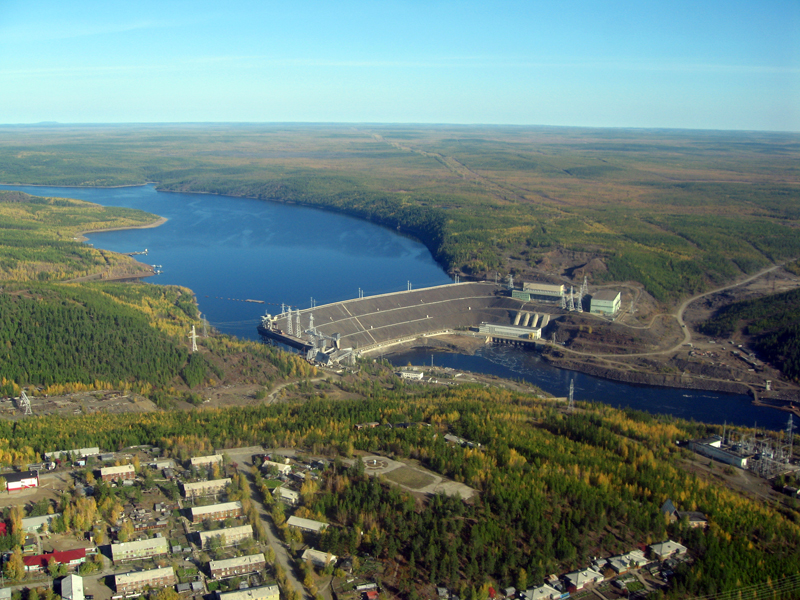
- View of Chernyshevsky and the Vilyuy Dam
- Interactive map of Chernyshevsky
- Location of Chernyshevsky Chernyshevsky (Sakha Republic)
- Coordinates: 63°01′N 112°28′E
- Country: Russia
- Federal subject: Sakha Republic
- Administrative district: Mirninsky District
- SettlementSelsoviet: Chernyshevsky
- Founded: 1959
- Urban-type settlement status since: 1961
- Elevation: 365 m (1,198 ft)

Population (2010 Census)
  - Total: 5,025
  - Estimate (2023): 3,383 (−32.7%)

Administrative status
  - Capital of: Settlement of Chernyshevsky

Municipal status
  - Municipal district: Mirninsky Municipal District
  - Urban settlement: Chernyshevsky Urban Settlement
  - Capital of: Chernyshevsky Urban Settlement
- Time zone: UTC+
- Postal code: 678185
- OKTMO ID: 98631162051

Chernyshevsky population
- 2010 Census: 5,025
- 2002 Census: 5,310
- 1989 Census: 8,298
- 1979 Census: 6,029

Chernyshevsky (Russian: Черныше́вский; Yakut: Чернышевскай, romanized: Çernışevskay) is an urban locality (an urban-type settlement) in Mirninsky District of the Sakha Republic, Russia, located 92 kilometers (57 mi) from Mirny, the administrative center of the district, on the southern edge of the Central Siberian Plateau on the Vilyuy River, a tributary of the Lena. As of the 2010 Census, its population was 5,025.

== History ==
It was founded in 1959 with the construction of the dam and hydroelectric plant on the Vilyuy River and granted urban-type settlement status in 1961. It was named after Nikolay Chernyshevsky, who was exiled in Siberia from 1864 until 1883, including from 1871 in nearby Vilyuysk.

After the hydroelectric project was completed in 1976, a large number of inhabitants moved away, with the population falling by almost a third between 1970 and 1979 but remaining fairly stable in the following years.

== Administrative and municipal status ==
Within the framework of administrative divisions, the urban-type settlement of Chernyshevsky is incorporated within Mirninsky District as the Settlement of Chernyshevsky. As a municipal division, the Settlement of Chernyshevsky is incorporated within Mirninsky Municipal District as Chernyshevsky Urban Settlement.

== Economy and infrastructure ==
Chernyshevsky is the site of the Vilyuy Dam, the first major hydroelectric project in the world to be built on permafrost, and with the coldest operating conditions of any hydroelectric plant in the world. The dam and the associated hydroelectric plant (Vilyuyskaya GES) are the main employers. The plant has a capacity of 680 MW and supplies power for the diamond mining activities in the nearby Udachny and Mirny.

There is also some fish farming in the reservoir behind the Vilyuy Dam, as well as some timber production and a geological research organization.

=== Transportation ===
Chernyshevsky lies on the road leading from Lensk on the Lena River to Mirny and Udachny. This is currently being upgraded as the future Anabar Highway, which will connect up to the Anabar River and the Arctic Ocean.

== Climate ==
Chernyshevsky has a harsh subarctic climate (Dfc).

Climate data for Chernyshevsky, Sakha Republic
Month	Jan	Feb	Mar	Apr	May	Jun	Jul	Aug	Sep	Oct	Nov	Dec	Year
Record high °C (°F)	4.9 (40.8)	2.2 (36.0)	12.8 (55.0)	16.9 (62.4)	29.5 (85.1)	32.8 (91.0)	36.9 (98.4)	32.2 (90.0)	26.1 (79.0)	16.1 (61.0)	5.0 (41.0)	−1.1 (30.0)	36.9 (98.4)
Mean daily maximum °C (°F)	−28.0 (−18.4)	−24.0 (−11.2)	−12.1 (10.2)	−1.9 (28.6)	8.0 (46.4)	18.3 (64.9)	22.0 (71.6)	18.0 (64.4)	8.7 (47.7)	−4.1 (24.6)	−19.6 (−3.3)	−26.6 (−15.9)	−3.2 (26.2)
Daily mean °C (°F)	−31.1 (−24.0)	−27.6 (−17.7)	−16.8 (1.8)	−6.4 (20.5)	3.9 (39.0)	13.4 (56.1)	17.0 (62.6)	13.2 (55.8)	4.8 (40.6)	−6.9 (19.6)	−22.8 (−9.0)	−29.8 (−21.6)	−7.2 (19.0)
Mean daily minimum °C (°F)	−34.8 (−30.6)	−32.1 (−25.8)	−22.4 (−8.3)	−12.7 (9.1)	−1.4 (29.5)	7.3 (45.1)	11.0 (51.8)	7.8 (46.0)	0.5 (32.9)	−10.6 (12.9)	−26.9 (−16.4)	−33.9 (−29.0)	−12.1 (10.2)
Record low °C (°F)	−57.2 (−71.0)	−53.9 (−65.0)	−50.0 (−58.0)	−43.9 (−47.0)	−17.8 (0.0)	−11.0 (12.2)	0.0 (32.0)	−7.8 (18.0)	−15.0 (5.0)	−37.2 (−35.0)	−51.1 (−60.0)	−60.0 (−76.0)	−60.0 (−76.0)
Average precipitation mm (inches)	19.2 (0.76)	18.0 (0.71)	27.8 (1.09)	32.7 (1.29)	37.7 (1.48)	57.2 (2.25)	52.3 (2.06)	44.7 (1.76)	47.0 (1.85)	56.2 (2.21)	34.6 (1.36)	23.7 (0.93)	451.1 (17.76)
Average precipitation days	24.0	20.6	18.1	13.8	12.6	12.2	10.4	13.0	17.0	25.7	25.3	22.9	215.6
