= Tomas Alibegov =

Russian banker (1937–2023)

Director general of Eurobank
- In office 1982–1987

deputy chairman of Vnesheconombank
- In office 1989–1997

Personal details
- Born: 18 June 1937; Moscow, Russian SFSR, Soviet Union
- Died: 24 April 2023 (aged 85); Moscow, Russia
- Occupation: Banker

Tomas Ivanovich Alibegov (Russian: Томас Иванович Алибегов; 18 June 1937 – 24 April 2023) was a Russian banker who was director general of Eurobank in Paris from 1982 to 1987 and deputy chairman of its successor Vnesheconombank from 1989 to 1997.

== Biography ==
Tomas Alibegov was born in Moscow into a family with Georgian and British roots. His father, Ivan Yakovlevich Alibegov, born in 1887 in Kutaisi, died in 1941 in the World War II, and his mother, Evelina Richardovna Manning, born in 1903 in Huddersfield, England, died in 1987 in Moscow.

In 1958, he graduated from the International Economic Relations Faculty of the Moscow Financial Institute. From 1958 to 1959 he worked at the Moscow Mechanical Plant.

From 1961 to 1969 he served as an inspector, expert, senior consultant, head of a department, and deputy head of the Office of Currency and Cash Operations of the Foreign Trade Bank of the USSR (Vneshtorgbank). From 1969 to 1975 he had been deputy manager and manager of the Moscow Narodny Bank branch in Beirut, Lebanon under Viktor Gerashchenko. During 1975–1982 he returned to Vneshtorgbank to become head of the Office of Currency and Cash Operations. From 1982 to 1987 he served as director general of Eurobank in Paris.

After 1987, he again worked at Vneshtorgbank (later renamed Vneshekonombank) as head of the Foreign Exchange Department and the Department of State and Foreign Loans; During 1988–1989 he became deputy chairman of the board – head of the Office for Monetary and Credit Cooperation with Socialist countries. While in this office, he dealt with the issues of external borrowing and turning the rouble into a freely convertible currency. From 1989 to 1997, Alibegov served as first deputy chairman and acting chairman of Vnesheconombank.

In the early 1990s, Alibegov was a frequent commenter in the Western media on the topics related to restructuring the external debt of the USSR or the capital outflow.

Later on, he was a member of the board of directors of the Bank for Corporate Financing (Faba Bank LLP).

== Personal life and death ==
Alibegov was married with two children. He died on 24 April 2023, at age 85.

== Recognition ==
- Order of the Red Banner of Labour
