= Volcanic pipe =

Subterranean structure formed by volcanic eruption

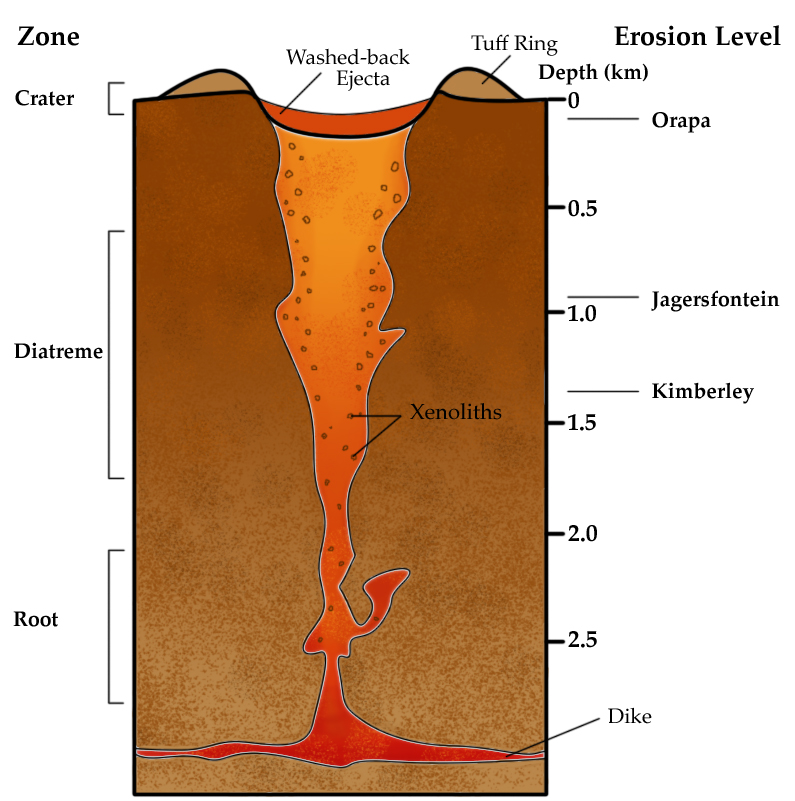
Volcanic Pipe

Volcanic pipes or volcanic conduits are subterranean geological structures formed by the violent, supersonic eruption of deep-origin volcanoes. They are a type of diatreme composed of a deep, narrow carrot-shaped cone of solidified magma usually composed of kimberlite or lamproite. These rocks reflect the composition of the volcanoes' deep magma sources rich in magnesium. They are the primary source of diamonds and are mined for this purpose. While diatremes are common, being the second commonest form of magma extrusion reaching the surface, volcanic pipes are relatively rare.

== Formation ==
Volcanic pipes form as the result of violent eruptions of deep-origin volcanoes. These volcanoes originate at least three times as deep as most other volcanoes, and the resulting magma that is pushed toward the surface is high in magnesium and volatile compounds such as water and carbon dioxide. As the body of magma rises toward the surface, the volatile compounds transform to gaseous phase as pressure is reduced with decreasing depth. This sudden expansion propels the magma upward at rapid speeds, resulting in a supersonic Plinian eruption.

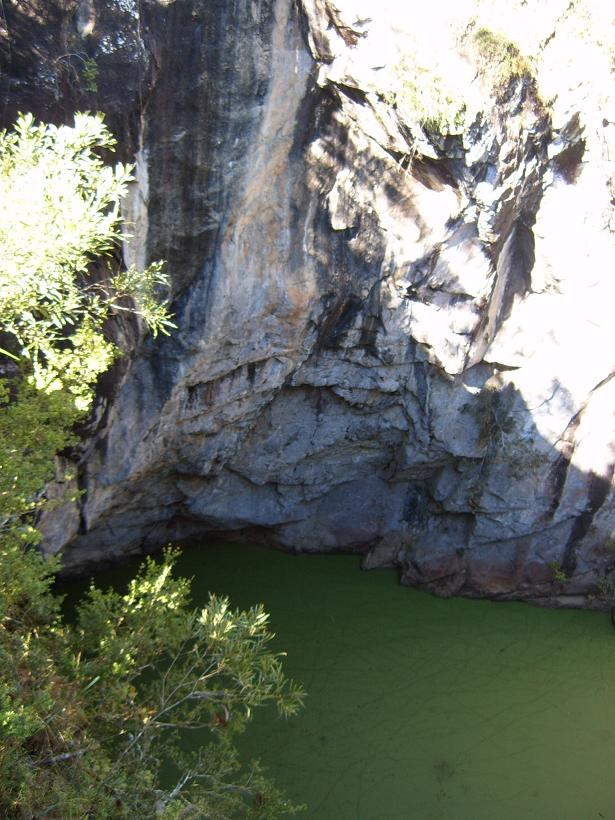
Mount Hypipamee Crater, Atherton Tableland, Queensland, Australia. This residue of a pipe is about 100 m (330 ft) across.

=== Kimberlite pipes ===
In kimberlite pipes, the eruption ejects a column of overlying material directly over the magma column, and does not form a large above-ground elevation as typical volcanoes do; instead, a low ring of ejecta known as a tuff ring forms around a bowl-shaped depression over the subterranean column of magma. Over time, the tuff ring may erode back into the bowl, leveling out the depression by filling it with washed-back ejecta. Kimberlite magmas have extremely high xenolith and xenocryst content (>30%). Kimberlite xenoliths are the source of most of the world's commercial diamond production, and also contain other precious gemstones and semi-precious stones, such as garnets, spinels, and peridot.

=== Lamproite pipes ===
Lamproite pipes operate similarly to kimberlite pipes, except that the boiling water and volatile compounds contained in the magma act corrosively on the overlying rock, resulting in a broader cone of eviscerated rock (the ejection of this rock also forms a tuff ring, like kimberlite eruptions). This broad cone is then filled with volcanic ash and materials. Finally, the degassed magma is pushed upward, filling the cone. The result is a funnel shaped deposit of volcanic material (both solidified magma, and ejecta) which appears mostly flat from the surface.

== See also ==
- Udachnaya pipe – Diamond mine in Sakha Republic, Russia
- Elliott County Kimberlite
- Lake Ellen Kimberlite – Geological formation
