= Elliott County Kimberlite =

Coordinates: 38°07′49.5″N 82°59′19.75″W

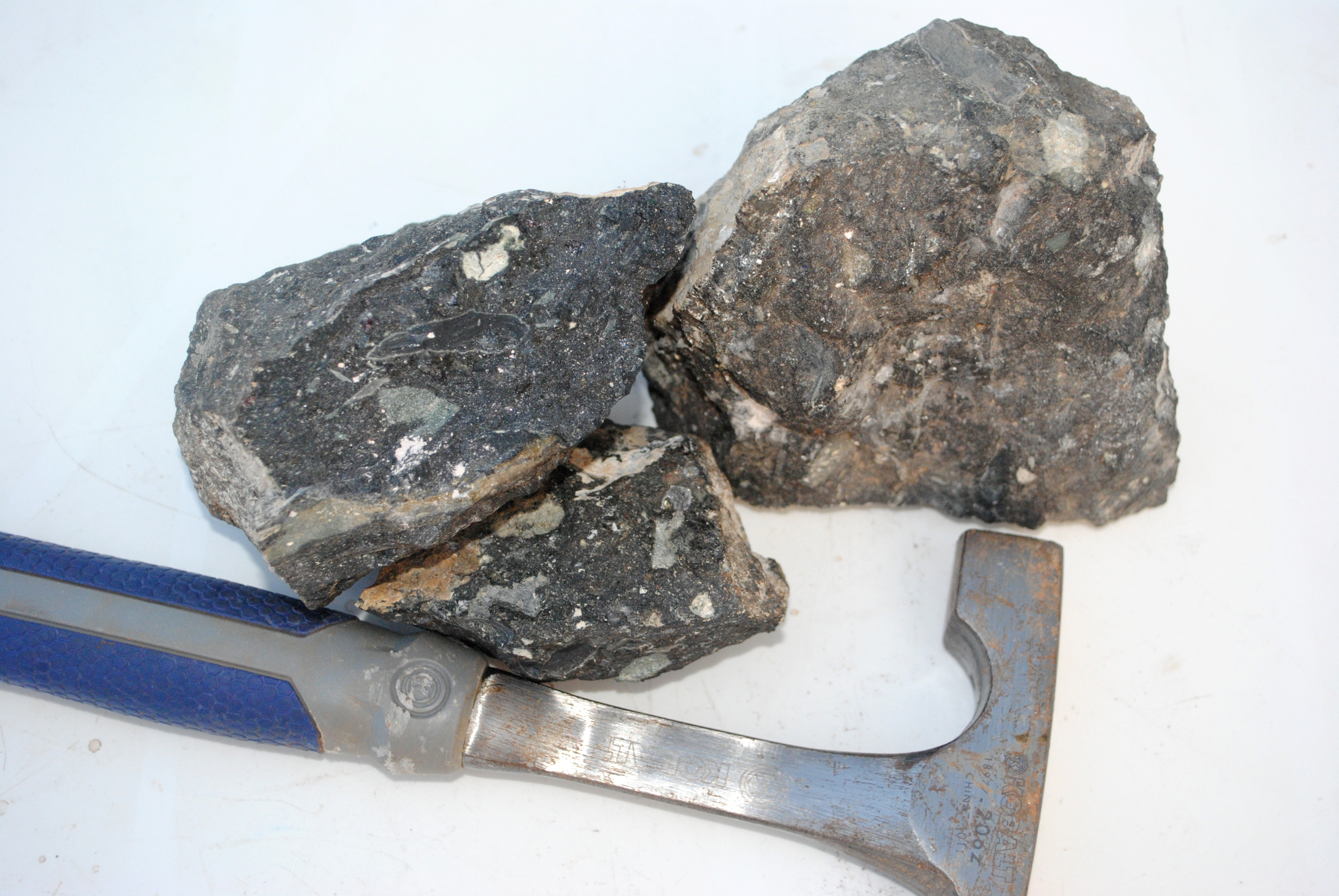
Typical resistant kimberlite from the Ison Creek (Elliott County) occurrence

The Elliott County Kimberlite (Sometimes called the Ison Creek Kimberlite) was discovered in Elliott County, Kentucky, by Albert R. Crandall in 1884 over two years before Carvill Lewis named a similar porphyritic peridotite occurring near Kimberley, South Africa, a kimberlite. It occurs as three separate elongate intrusive bodies 1/4 to 1/2 mi in length and a few hundred feet in width, within an area of about a square mile. The rock is a dark-green peridotite (kimberlite) composed of serpentinized olivine and a number of accessory minerals, including phlogopite, pyrope, calcite, enstatite, magnesian ilmenite, and others. Xenoliths, mainly of shale, and igneous rock inclusions are abundant in the three intrusive bodies as described by William Brown in 1977. Detailed petrographic descriptions of the peridotite are presented by Diller in 1887 and Bolivar in 1982. The peridotite has been dated to Early Permian time by K-Ar and Rb-Sr dating of xenocrystic biotite from one of the intrusive masses, however more recent evidence points to a Cretaceous emplacement. The rock is relatively nonresistant, is commonly disintegrated to as much as 50 feet, and usually asserts no topographical expression. Unweathered rock is hard, dark greenish black and weathers to grayish olive. The saprolite is yellowish to reddish brown and strewn with garnet and ilmenite fragments and xenoliths. Several attempts have been made to find diamonds in the kimberlite with no success.

== See also ==
- Lamproite
- Lake Ellen Kimberlite
