= Chernyshevsky, Altai Krai =

Chernyshevsky Чернышевский
- Settlement
- Location within Altai Krai Location within Russia
- Coordinates: 52°36′N 82°20′E
- Country: Russia
- Region: Altai Krai
- District: Aleysky District
- Time zone: UTC+7:00

Chernyshevsky (Russian: Чернышевский) is a rural locality (a settlement) in Mokhovsky Selsoviet, Aleysky District, Altai Krai, Russia. The population was 87 as of 2013. There are 2 streets.

== Geography ==
Chernyshevsky is located 35 km northwest of Aleysk (the district's administrative centre) by road. Mokhovskoye is the nearest rural locality.
