= Alrosa =

Russian diamond mining company

Alrosa PJSC
- Native name: АК «АЛРОСА» (ПАО)
- Type: Public
- Traded as: MCX: ALRS
- Industry: Mining, processing and trading of rough diamonds, manufacturing of polished diamonds
- Founded: 19 February 1992; 34 years ago
- Headquarters: Mirny, Sakha Republic, Russia
- Key people: Pavel Marinychev (CEO); Anton Siluanov (chairman of the Supervisory Board)
- Products: Diamonds
- Revenue: $2.76 billion (2025)
- Operating income: $759 million (2025)
- Net income: $425 million (2025)
- Total assets: $8.21 billion (2025)
- Total equity: $4.77 billion (2025)
- Number of employees: 32,475 (2020)
- Website: alrosa.ru/en/

Alrosa (Russian: АЛРОСА) is a Russian group of diamond mining companies which specialize in exploration, mining, manufacture, and sale of diamonds. The company leads the world in diamond mining by volume. Mining takes place in Western Yakutia, the Arkhangelsk region, and Africa. Alrosa is Russia's leading diamond mining and distribution company, accounting for 95% of Russian diamond production and 27% of global diamond extraction.

The company's headquarters are located in Mirny (Sakha Republic) and Moscow.

== History ==
The history of Alrosa dates back to 1954, when the first primary deposit of diamonds in the Soviet Union, the kimberlite pipe Zarnitsa, was found. In 1955 the Mir kimberlite pipe and the Udachnaya pipe were discovered. A total of fifteen primary diamond sources were found in 1955.

In 1957, a decision was made to begin mining and production operations on alluvial and ore deposits in Yakutia. To manage the facility's construction and subsequent operations, the Yakutalmaz group of companies was established with headquarters in Mirny. The first commercial-grade diamonds were recovered the same year. Two years later, the Soviet Union sold the first shipment of diamonds on the world market.

For the most part during the Soviet period, the diamond mining industry developed on the basis of the Mir open-pit mine and adjacent alluvial deposits. In those years its main open-pit mines, processing plants and related energy generating facilities were put into operation. In 1960, the Djomolungma and Chimyan was discovered, and in 1969, the International kimberlite pipe.

In 1963, the first sales contracts between the USSR and De Beers group were signed. In 2009 this cooperation was brought to an end as contrary to European Union competition laws in compliance with a decision of the European Commission. Now Alrosa independently distributes its rough diamond production on the world market.

Through 1980, the rapid development of primary deposits continued in Aykhal township on the basis of the Jubilee pipe and in Udachny town. Today the Udachny open-pit mine is one of the largest open-pit mines in the world.

Because the Soviet Union was very heavily indebted in the late 1980s, (Note: With the collapse in world oil prices beginning on 13 September 1985 when Saudi Arabia's Minister of Petroleum Sheikh Yamani announced a new oil policy and that Saudi Arabia would increase its production and which, over the next six months, oil production in Saudi Arabia rose tremendously and the Soviet Union, which was heavily dependent upon oil sales to support its interests, encountered enormous financial difficulties.) Viktor Vladimirivich Gerashchenko and six others travelled among Saudi Arabia, United Arab Emirates, and others from September 1990 until the afternoon of 17 January 1991 to obtain very large loans from Persian Gulf states to prevent the collapse of the Soviet banking system. However, Gerashenko could not obtain loans but Yevgeny Primakov and Thomas Alibegov did obtain loans but not enough so schemes involving diamond trades would be pursued to obtain additional credits. (Note: According to Andrey Illarionov, the Soviet Union received a $1.7 billion loan in 1990 from Saudi Arabia, United Arab Emirates, and Kuwait as payment for the Soviet Union's veto of Desert Storm which removed Saddam Hussein.) Using uncut diamonds for loans was not as profitable as using cut gems and the Soviet and later Russia friendly expert who cuts and polishes the gems is Lev Leviev of Africa Israel Investments (AFI).

Alrosa closed joint-stock company was set up according to Presidential Decree №158C of the President of Russia "On the Establishment of the Almazy Rossii-Sakha Joint Stock Company" signed on 19 February 1992, based on NPO Yakutalmaz, a former USSR state-owned diamond mining company.

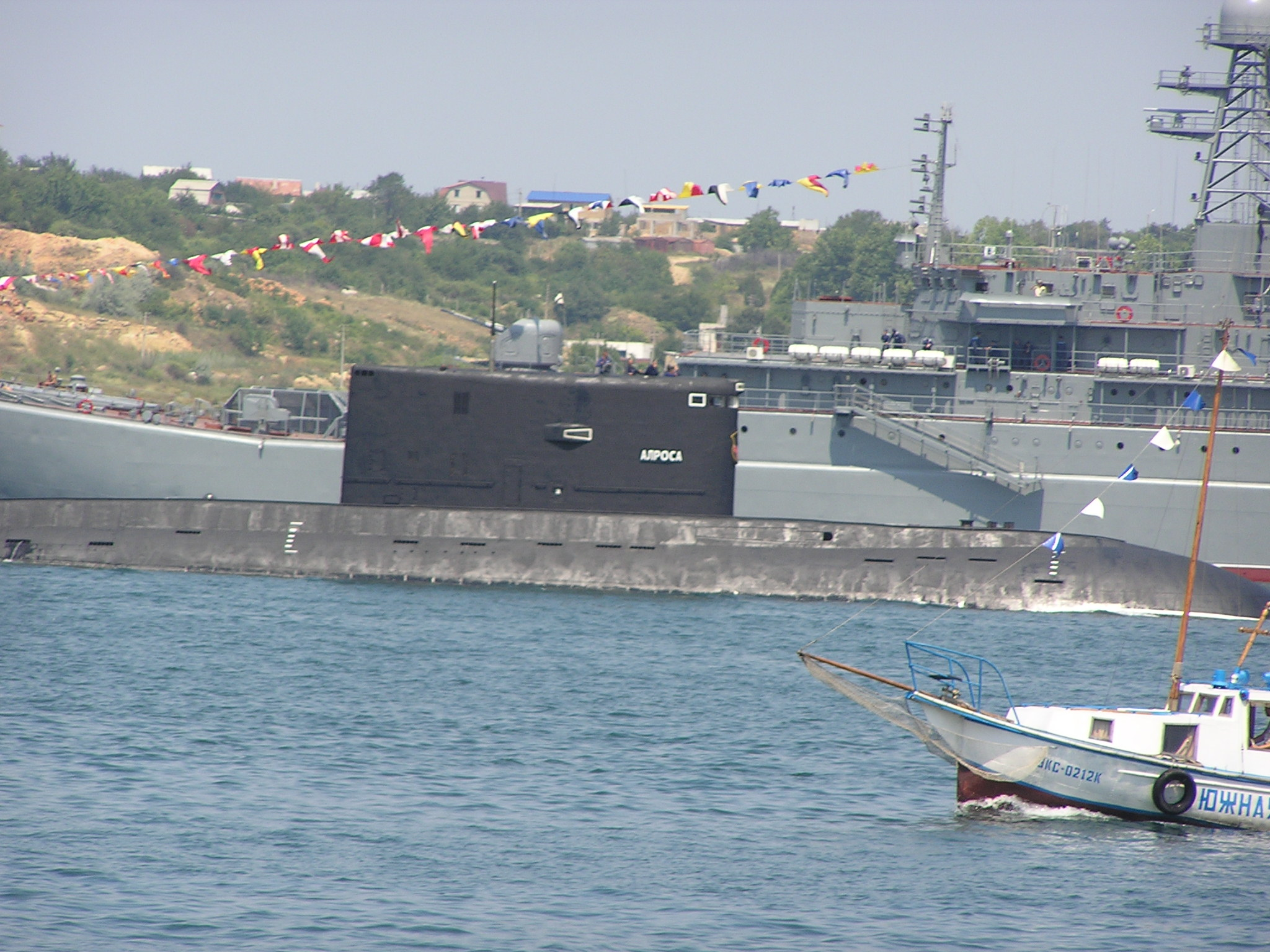
B-871 "Alrosa" in Sevastopol in 2006.

In 1997, Alrosa started sponsoring the Russian submarine B-871, named "Alrosa" since 2004. This serves the goals of both upholding the Russian Navy and providing Yakutian youths a military alternative to crime, drugs and alcoholism.

In 2008, Alrosa acquired a license to mine, process and store uranium. In 2009, it partnered with Rosatom, the nuclear state company of Russia.

In 2011, Alrosa was reorganized as an open joint-stock company with free float of Alrosa's shares on financial markets.

In July 2007, Verkhne-Munskoye diamond field in Yakutia was discovered with an estimated value of about $3.5 billion.

In August 2009, after the 2008 financial crisis, Prime Minister Vladimir Putin announced the Russian government, via Gokhran, would buy $1 billion in uncut diamonds from Alrosa. This was to support the Russian diamond mining industry while avoiding saturation in the global diamond market and thus further depression of diamond prices. The diamond mining industry is critical to the Yakutia economy.

On 28 October 2013, the company carried out the IPO. The Russian government and the Republic of Sakha (Yakutia) sold a combined 14% stake (in equal shares), while Alrosa offered about 2% in treasury stock. U.S. investors were the biggest buyers of the shares, purchasing up to 60% of the stake, 24% got European investors, Russian investors accounted for about 14%. Investment funds Oppenheimer Funds Inc. and Lazard Ltd. took part in the IPO and bought over 2% of the stake. Alrosa raised $1.3 billion in share sales.

In 2016, Alrosa was ranked as being among the 12th best of 92 oil, gas, and mining companies on indigenous rights in the Arctic.

In 2017, ALROSA implemented over 500 social and charitable initiatives. Over 70% of all initiatives were implemented in Yakutia – ALROSA's key region where the company conducts its core business. These initiatives are partially implemented through nonprofit organization "Target Fund for Future Generations of the Republic of Sakha (Yakutia)", in which the company has invested over 4.5 bln rubles for the whole period of cooperation since 2011. That year, ALROSA was ranked among the top three in the environmental responsibility rating of the Russian mining and smelting companies. The rating was developed by the World Wildlife Fund, United Nations Development Programme, Global Environment Facility, and the Ministry of Natural Resources and Environment of the Russian Federation.

In June 2017, Memorandum of Cooperation between PJSC ALROSA and Gem & Jewelry Export Promotion Council (GJEPC) was signed in the scope of India-Russia Summit with the participation of the Russian President Vladimir Putin and Indian Prime Minister Narendra Modi.

In June 2017, ALROSA entered Top-5 of companies with sustainable development, according to "Polar Index". “Polar Index” is the first and only specialized rating in Russia of companies whose geography of activities affects the Arctic zone of Russia.

According to the results of the research conducted by PwC in 2017, ALROSA is an absolute leader among diamond mining companies in terms of investments in social programs directing to social spending on average 2.8% of its revenue (while the respective average level for other participants of the rating is about 0.5%).

In January 2018, ALROSA was ranked 10th among corporations in Russia in terms of corporate transparence with an index of 6.0 out of a maximum of 10.0 (with the overall index for Russia being 2.6), according to the study "Transparency in Corporate Reporting", prepared by Transparency International - Russia.

In 2021, ALROSA was ranked no. 53 in the Arctic Environmental Responsibility Index (AERI) that covers 120 oil, gas, and mining companies involved in resource extraction north of the Arctic Circle. In 2021, the company's revenue in Russia amounted to 262 billion rubles.

=== Sanctions ===
In 2022, in response to Russia's invasion of Ukraine, several countries moved to implement economic sanctions against several Russian-based companies, individuals and financial institutions. On February 24, 2022, US President Joe Biden announced sanctions against Alrosa. However, the diamond-cutting companies of Antwerp, Belgium, keep importing from Alrosa although at lower volume.

On January 3, 2024, the European Union imposed sanctions on Alrosa, and its CEO, Pavel Marinychev, as part of its "unwavering commitment" to Ukraine in the conflict against Russia. Alrosa, responsible for approximately 90% of Russia's diamond production, saw its assets in Europe frozen, with EU citizens and companies prohibited from providing funds to the company. Pavel Marinychev, faced a travel ban in Europe. This move followed the EU's earlier prohibition, effective from January 1, 2024 on the import, purchase, or transfer of Russian non-industrial natural and synthetic diamonds and diamond jewelry.

== Structure ==
=== Shareholders ===
As of 2017 ALROSA was the sector's largest public diamond mining company. Its public float is 34%, with 33% owned by the Russian Federation. The Company’s market capitalization was RUB 553 billion in 2017 (US$9.6 billion).

On 13 March 2017, Sergey Ivanov was elected as the president of ALROSA. Since 11 January 2018, senior leadership position was renamed into "chief executive officer - chairman of the executive committee".

== Operations ==
The main production facilities are currently concentrated mainly in Western Yakutia and the Arkhangelsk region. In total Alrosa is developing 27 fields. The Company has a diversified production base consisting of 11 primary and 16 alluvial deposits. Primary deposits are developed both open-pit, alluvial operations and underground mining.

On the territory of the Republic of Sakha (Yakutia) Alrosa has four mining and processing divisions - Mirny, Aykhal, Udachny, Nyurba. The rest of deposits are developing through subsidiaries: OJSC Alrosa-Nyurba, JSC Diamonds Anabara and JSC Severalmaz.

The reserves owned by ALROSA Group according to the standards of the State Reserves Committee totaled 1,171,951.7 thousand carats in C1+C2 categories as of January 1, 2018 (taking into account the explored deposits under the National Reserves Committee standards it was 1,182 million carats) accounting for 95% of total Russian stocks of raw materials.

Alrosa is actively engaged in the exploration of new fields. Its assets have a number of new deposits in Western Yakutia. Alrosa is also launching prospecting and exploration works in Angola and Botswana. Alrosa operates in the Republic of Angola. Mining in the Luanda Sul Province on the basis of the Catoca kimberlite pipe takes place through Sociedade Mineira de Catoca (Catoca Ltd.), the largest diamond producer in Central Africa, 32,8% shares owned by Alrosa.

Mirny Mining and Processing Division (MPD)

Mirny Mining and Processing Division (MPD) was founded in 1957 and is the oldest division of ALROSA. Its share in ALROSA Group’s production totaled 18% in 2017. Mirny MPD is developing the following deposits: Mir (temporarily shut down) and International kimberlite pipes, Vodorazdelnye Galechniki, Irelyakh and Gornoye placer deposits, and Tailings of Processing Plant No. 5 (technogenic deposit).

Diamond output in 2017:
Mir underground mine	2.76 million carats
International underground mine	3.7 million carats
Alluvial and technogenic deposits	740 thousand carats

The Aykhal Mining and Processing Division (MPD)

The Aykhal Mining and Processing Division (MPD) was established in 1986 and mines diamonds at the following deposits: Jubilee and Komsomolsky open-pits, Aykhal underground mine. Its share in ALROSA Group’s production exceeded 30% in 2017.

Diamond output in 2017:
Jubilee open-pit	10.16 million carats
Komsomolsky open-pit	370.4 thousand carats
Aykhal underground mine	2.48 million carats

Udachny Mining and Processing Division (MPD)

Udachny Mining and Processing Division (MPD) is a business unit of ALROSA located in Western Yakutia. The division develops the Udachnaya and Zarnitsa kimberlite pipes, Dellyuvialnaya and Ruchey Piropovy placer deposits. Its share in ALROSA Group’s production totaled 11% in 2016. Diamond output at the Udachny Mining and Processing Division (MPD) in 2016 amounted to 3.8 million carats.

The Nyurba Mining and Processing Division (MPD)

The Nyurba Mining and Processing Division (MPD) is one of the youngest enterprises of ALROSA. It operates at the Nakyn ore field. It develops the following deposits: Nyurbinsky and Botuobinsky open-pits, and two homonymous alluvial placers. Its share in ALROSA Group's production totaled 19% in 2017. Diamond output at the Nyurba Mining and Processing Division (MPD) in 2017 totaled 7.7 million carats.

== Core business related affiliates and controlled companies ==
OJSC Almazy Anabara

The company was established in January 1998 as LLC Almazy Anabara for the purpose of alluvial diamond mining in the Anabar ulus (far north-west of Yakutia). In August 2004, it was reorganized into OJSC Almazy Anabara. SC Almazy Anabara is one of the leading companies in the Republic of Sakha (Yakutia). It has been a wholly owned subsidiary of ALROSA since 2007.

In 2017, Almazy Anabara and Nizhne-Lenskoye (its subsidiary company acquired in 2013) produced 5.2 million carats of rough diamonds; its share with Nizhne-Lenskoye in ALROSA Group’s production totaled 13% in 2017.

Sociedade Mineira de Catoca (Catoca Ltd.)

Sociedade Mineira de Catoca (Catoca Ltd.) is one of the most high-performance industrial companies in the Republic of Angola. It is the first mining company in Angolan history that started the large-scale mining of the Catoca kimberlite pipe (the Luanda Sul Province), one of the largest diamond primary deposits – the fourth largest in the world. Open Joint Stock Company ALROSA (Russia) owns 32.8% of the Catoca Ltd. shares.

Public Joint Stock Company ALROSA-Nyurba

The company was established in 1997. It holds the mining licenses for the Nyurbinskoye and Botuobinskoye primary deposits, and same-name placers closely associated with pipes. ALROSA owns 97,48% of interest in PJSC ALROSA-Nyurba which operates in the Nyurba District of the Republic of Sakha (Yakutia). The operator of the ALROSA-Nyurba development and mining projects, under the services agreement, is Nyurba Mining & Processing Division (MPD) of ALROSA. Share of Nyurba MPD in ALROSA Group’s production totaled 20% in 2017.

== Financial indicators ==
- Reporting standards: IFRS
- Auditor: PWC – no remarks
- Unit of measurement: RUB bn

	2015	2016	2017
Total Assets	435	473	428
Liabilities	228	179	86
Equity	152	257	267
Proceeds	225	317	275
Profit	32	133	79
Shares	7364965630	7364965630	7364965630
Earnings per share	4.21	17.85	10.47

== 2017 Pink Diamond find ==
On 21 September 2017, TASS news agency reported Alrosa's most expensive gem to date, a 28.65 carat pink diamond. The largest pink diamond previously mined by Alrosa weighed 3.86 carats, one of a total of only three others that the company has mined of over two carats each during the past eight years. The gem is reported to be of jewelry quality, measuring 22.47 x 15.69 x 10.9 millimetres, with a saturated pink tone and practically no defects, according to Alrosa. The pink diamond was mined by subsidiary Almazy Anabara, which operates the Severalmaz kimberlite pipes and placer deposits near riverways in the northwest part of Yakutia.

== Sales and Marketing ==
Alrosa's trading policy is regulated by the Regulations on Procedures and Conditions of Selling Natural Diamonds drafted jointly with Federal Antimonopoly Service of Russia (FAS).

In 2012, Alrosa signed a long-term agreement for the supply of rough diamonds with Belgium's Laurelton Diamondsa Inc., a subsidiary of Tiffany & Co. According to the terms of the three-year trade agreement Tiffany & Co. can annually purchase rough diamonds worth at least 60 million U.S. dollars.

ALROSA actively supports Russian government bodies in their efforts to achieve the goals and implement the requirements of the Kimberley Process by various means, including taking a strong and principled position to not supply rough diamonds to legal entities and individual business people if they:

- come from a country that is not an official member of the Kimberley Process;
- do not comply with the international Kimberley Process Diamond Certification Scheme (KPCS);
- violate the procedure for separate sales of natural, synthetic and treated natural diamonds and their end products established in the global practice;
- violate the requirements of tax, customs and other legislation;
- are in the process of restructuring, liquidation or insolvency;
- have provided inaccurate information about themselves.

== Financial results ==
- In 2017, ALROSA exceeded that year's target by producing 39.6 million carats of diamonds, which is a 6% improvement from a year earlier.
- The diamond sales of ALROSA Group exceeded 41 million carats in 2017, which is a 3% increase compared to the previous year.
- In 2017, the company’s revenue was RUB 275.4 billion, EBITDA was RUB 126.9 billion, net profit was RUB 78.6 billion.
- ALROSA market capitalization in 2017 was RUB 553 billion or US$9.59 billion as of the end of the reporting period.

== Links to the Icelandic financial crisis ==
Document trail showed that Alrosa's Luxembourg-registered subsidiary Alrosa Finance was partially owned by Shapburg Limited and Quenon Investments Limited. Both companies are related to other Icelandic companies. The finding was reported in 2005 in Denmark.

== See also ==
- Diamonds as an investment
- Kremlin Diamond Fund
