= Udachny =

Udachny Удачный
- Town under district jurisdiction

Other transcription(s)
  - Yakut: Удачнай
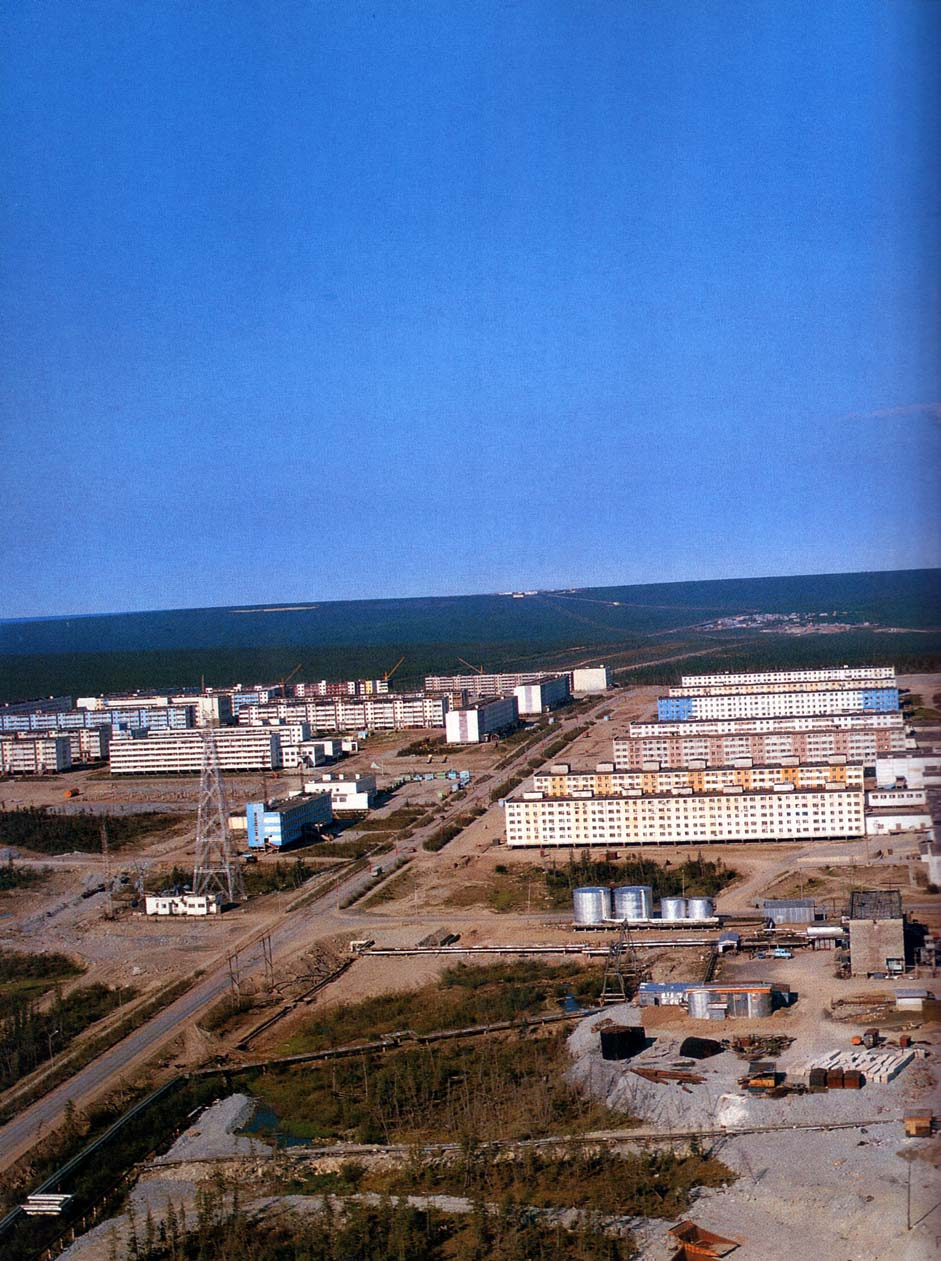
- View of Udachny

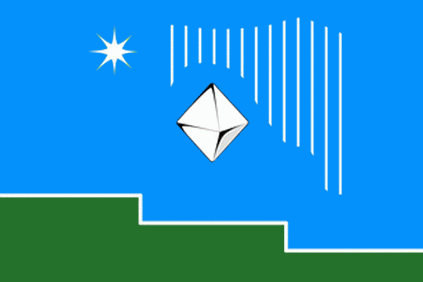
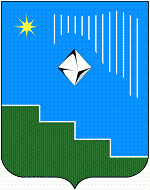
- Flag Coat of arms
- Interactive map of Udachny
- Location of Udachny Udachny (Sakha Republic)
- Coordinates: 66°24′N 112°19′E
- Country: Russia
- Federal subject: Sakha Republic
- Administrative district: Mirninsky District
- TownSelsoviet: Udachny
- Founded: 1968
- Town status since: 1987

Government
  - Head: Artur Prikhodko
- Elevation: 380 m (1,250 ft)

Population (2010 Census)
  - Total: 12,613
  - Estimate (2023): 13,349 (+5.8%)

Administrative status
  - Capital of: Town of Udachny

Municipal status
  - Municipal district: Mirninsky Municipal District
  - Urban settlement: Udachny Urban Settlement
  - Capital of: Udachny Urban Settlement
- Time zone: UTC+
- Postal code: 678188
- Dialing code: +7 41136
- OKTMO ID: 98631109001
- Website: мо-город-удачный.рф

Udachny (Russian: Удачный, IPA: [ʊˈdatɕnɨj], lit. successful or lucky; Yakut: Удачнай, Udaçnay) is a town in Mirninsky District of the Sakha Republic, Russia, located on the Markha River, 508 kilometers (316 mi) from Mirny, the administrative center of the district. As of the 2010 Census, its population was 12,613.

Historical population
| Year | Pop. | ±% |
|---|---|---|
| 1970 | 2,036 | — |
| 1979 | 11,604 | +469.9% |
| 1989 | 19,603 | +68.9% |
| 2002 | 15,698 | −19.9% |
| 2010 | 12,613 | −19.7% |
| 2021 | 12,930 | +2.5% |
Source: Census data

== History ==
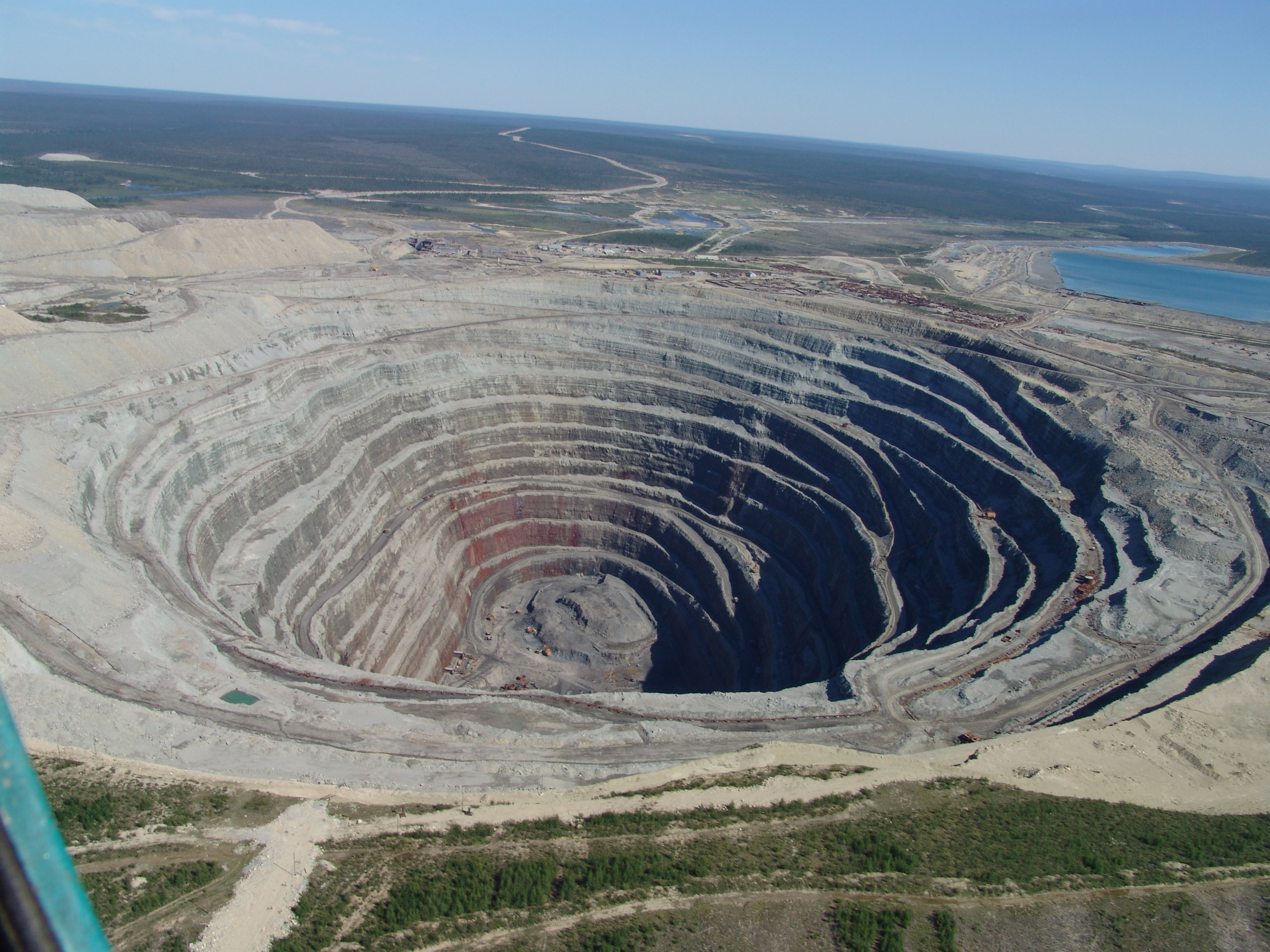
Udachnaya pipe

The Udachnaya pipe diamond deposit was discovered in 1955. Due to its isolated location, it was not exploited until the 1960s. In conjunction with the beginnings of diamond production, the urban-type settlement of Udachny was founded in 1968; town status was granted to it in 1987.

As part of a plan to create the basin for a tailings dam for the nearby diamond mine, a 1.7 kiloton atomic bomb was detonated 98 meters (322 ft) underground near Udachny on October 2, 1974. Original plans had called for eight similar explosions to be conducted; however, due to radioactive fallout being far greater than expected, the project was halted after the first blast. The shaft in which the explosion was held was not plugged until eighteen years later, with an estimated 7-to-20-meter (23 to 66 ft) thick concrete sarcophagus.

== Administrative and municipal status ==
As an inhabited locality, Udachny is classified as a town under district jurisdiction. Within the framework of administrative divisions, it is, together with one rural locality (the selo of Polyarny), incorporated within Mirninsky District as the Town of Udachny. As a municipal division, the Town of Udachny is incorporated within Mirninsky Municipal District as Udachny Urban Settlement.

== Economy ==
Diamond mining remains the principal economic activity in the town. Udachny is the second most important diamond production site after Mirny for the state-owned ALROSA corporation. It is served by Polyarny Airport 12 km outside of town.

== Climate ==
Udachny has an extreme subarctic climate (Köppen climate classification Dfd). Winters are extremely cold, with average temperatures from −43.6 °C (−46.5 °F) to −35.2 °C (−31.4 °F) in January, while summers are mild, with average temperatures from +8.4 °C (47.1 °F) to +20.1 °C (68.2 °F) in July. Precipitation is quite low, but is significantly higher in summer than at other times of the year.

Climate data for Udachny
| Month | Jan | Feb | Mar | Apr | May | Jun | Jul | Aug | Sep | Oct | Nov | Dec | Year |
|---|---|---|---|---|---|---|---|---|---|---|---|---|---|
| Mean daily maximum °C (°F) | −35.2 (−31.4) | −30.3 (−22.5) | −17.6 (0.3) | −6.1 (21.0) | 3.8 (38.8) | 15.6 (60.1) | 20.1 (68.2) | 15.8 (60.4) | 6.3 (43.3) | −7.7 (18.1) | −25.4 (−13.7) | −31.5 (−24.7) | −7.7 (18.2) |
| Daily mean °C (°F) | −39.4 (−38.9) | −35.2 (−31.4) | −24.3 (−11.7) | −12.6 (9.3) | −0.8 (30.6) | 10.1 (50.2) | 14.2 (57.6) | 10.2 (50.4) | 2.1 (35.8) | −11.5 (11.3) | −29.8 (−21.6) | −36.0 (−32.8) | −12.7 (9.1) |
| Mean daily minimum °C (°F) | −43.6 (−46.5) | −40.0 (−40.0) | −30.9 (−23.6) | −19.0 (−2.2) | −5.4 (22.3) | 4.6 (40.3) | 8.4 (47.1) | 4.6 (40.3) | −2.0 (28.4) | −15.3 (4.5) | −34.1 (−29.4) | −40.4 (−40.7) | −17.8 (0.0) |
| Average precipitation mm (inches) | 12 (0.5) | 9 (0.4) | 11 (0.4) | 16 (0.6) | 27 (1.1) | 46 (1.8) | 59 (2.3) | 50 (2.0) | 34 (1.3) | 28 (1.1) | 20 (0.8) | 14 (0.6) | 326 (12.9) |
Source: http://en.climate-data.org/location/30312/
