= Mirninsky District =

Mirninsky District Мирнинский улус (Russian)
- District

Other transcription(s)
  - Yakut: Мииринэй улууһа
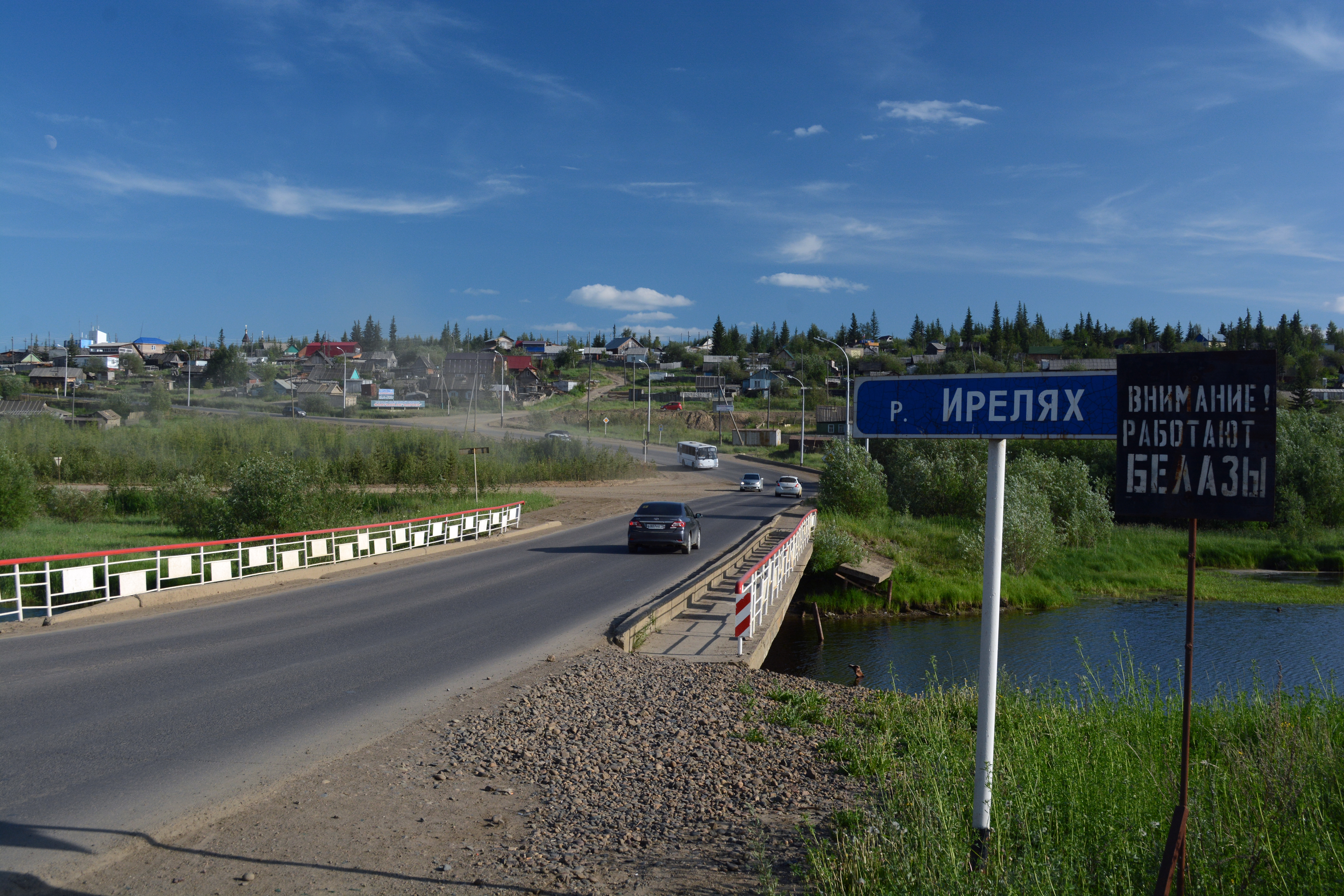
- View of the town of Mirny, the administrative center of the district

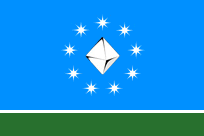
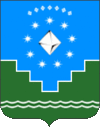
- Flag Coat of arms
- Location of Mirninsky District in the Sakha Republic
- Coordinates: 62°32′N 113°57′E
- Country: Russia
- Federal subject: Sakha Republic
- Established: January 12, 1965
- Administrative center: Mirny

Area
  - Total: 165,800 km^{2} (64,000 sq mi)

Population (2010 Census)
  - Total: 38,802
  - Density: 0.2340/km^{2} (0.6061/sq mi)
  - Urban: 92.9%
  - Rural: 7.1%

Administrative structure
  - Administrative divisions: 2 Towns, 4 Settlements, 3 Rural okrugs
  - Inhabited localities: 2 cities/towns, 4 urban-type settlements, 8 rural localities

Municipal structure
  - Municipally incorporated as: Mirninsky Municipal District
  - Municipal divisions: 6 urban settlements, 3 rural settlements
- Time zone: UTC+
- OKTMO ID: 98631000
- Website: http://www.алмазный-край.рф

Mirninsky District (Russian: Ми́рнинский район; Yakut: Мииринэй улууһа, Miiriney uluuha) is an administrative and municipal district (raion, or ulus), one of the thirty-four in the Sakha Republic, Russia. It is located in the west of the republic and borders Olenyoksky District in the north and northeast, Nyurbinsky and Suntarsky Districts in the east, Lensky District in the south, and Irkutsk Oblast and Krasnoyarsk Krai in the west. The area of the district is 165,800 square kilometers (64,000 sq mi). Its administrative center is the town of Mirny. As of the 2010 Census, the total population of the district (excluding its administrative center) was 38,802.

== Geography ==
The Vilyuy and its tributaries Ulakhan-Botuobuya, Chirkuo, Ulakhan-Vava, Lakharchana, Sen, Chona and Akhtaranda —with the Alymdya and Olguydakh, including the Vakunayka and the Killemtine, are the main rivers in the district.

=== Climate ===
Average January temperature ranges from −32 °C (−26 °F) in the south to −40 °C (−40 °F) in the north. July's average temperature ranges from +14 °C (57 °F) to +16 °C (61 °F). The average annual precipitation is about 250–300 millimeters (9.8–11.8 in).

== History ==
The Vilyuy River basin was believed to contain mineral deposits at least as early as the 19th century, with Richard Maack reporting after an expedition to the area that the area was rich in iron, salt deposits, and precious stones. He described a nest of blue clay in the area between the Vilyuy and Malaya Bituobiya Rivers, but as kimberlites had not yet been discovered there was no official attention.

Around the beginning on the 20th century, a number of scientists and geologists noted similarities between parts of the Central Siberian Plateau and areas in South Africa, where exploitation of primary diamond deposits had already begun. In 1937, the Soviet government began to greatly increase effort to produce diamonds on its own territory, due in part to some other diamond-producing nations being unwilling to sell to the USSR. Expeditions were organized in the basins of the Yenisei River and in the Ural Mountains. The Ural expedition proved the more successful, finding small, but commercially viable deposits.

An additional government decree signed by Stalin in 1946 announced further exploration for diamonds, with expeditions mounted from Irkutsk into the region of the Yenisei River. The first officially recorded discovery of diamonds in Yakutia (the present-day Sakha Republic) was made in 1949 on an expedition along the Vilyuy. Initially, discoveries centered on placer deposits, which did not uncover the enormous primary deposits in the form of kimberlite pipes.

The first kimberlite deposit, Zarnitsa mine, was discovered on August 21, 1954. Further exploration in 1955 found over fifteen primary deposits, including the largest pipes at Udachny and Mirny. Over two hundred kimberlite pipes have since been identified in the Sakha Republic.

Mirninsky District was established on January 12, 1965, after large-scale diamond mining was started in the area and associated industries began to grow.

== Administrative and municipal status ==
Within the framework of administrative divisions, Mirninsky District is one of the thirty-four in the republic. It is divided into two towns (administrative divisions with the administrative centers in the towns (inhabited localities) of Mirny and Udachny), four settlements (administrative divisions with the administrative centers in the urban-type settlements (inhabited localities) of Aykhal, Almazny, Chernyshevsky, and Svetly), and three rural okrugs (naslegs), all of which comprise eight rural localities. As a municipal division, the district is incorporated as Mirninsky Municipal District. Within the municipal district, the two towns and the four settlements are incorporated into six urban settlements, and the three rural okrugs are incorporated into three rural settlements. The town of Mirny serves as the administrative center of both the administrative and municipal district.

=== Inhabited localities ===
Administrative/municipal composition
| Towns/Urban settlements | Population | Inhabited localities in jurisdiction |
|---|---|---|
| Mirny (Мирный) | 37,188 | **Town of Mirny** (administrative center of the district) |
| Udachny (Удачный) | 12,613 | **Town of Udachny**; selo of Polyarny |
| Settlements/Urban settlements | Population | Inhabited localities in jurisdiction |
| Aykhal (Айхал) | 13,803 | **Urban-type settlement of Aykhal**; selo of Morkoka |
| Almazny (Алмазный) | 1,614 | **Urban-type settlement of Almazny**; selo of Berezovka; selo of Novy |
| Chernyshevsky (Чернышевский) | 5,025 | **Urban-type settlement of Chernyshevsky** |
| Svetly (Светлый) | 3,137 | **Urban-type settlement of Svetly** |
| Rural okrugs/Rural settlements | Population | Rural localities in jurisdiction |
| Botuobuyinsky (Ботуобуйинский) | 480 | **selo of Tas-Yuryakh** |
| Sadynsky (Садынский национальный эвенкийский) | 318 | **selo of Syuldyukar** |
| Chuoninsky (Чуонинский) | 1,812 | **selo of Arylakh**; selo of Zarya |

*Administrative centers are shown in bold

== Economy ==
The economy of the district is mostly based on mining. Natural resources include diamonds, oil, gas, and brown coal. Diamond mining is mostly carried out by ALROSA company and its subsidiaries.

=== Transportation ===
Mirninsky District is connected with Yakutsk by the means of the Vilyuy Highway.

== Demographics ==
Historical population
| Year | Pop. | ±% |
|---|---|---|
| 1970 | 21,516 | — |
| 1979 | 29,394 | +36.6% |
| 1989 | 51,824 | +76.3% |
| 2002 | 86,013 | +66.0% |
| 2010 | 75,990 | −11.7% |
| 2021 | 71,303 | −6.2% |
Source: Census data

As of the 1989 Census, the ethnic composition was as follows:

- Russians: 67.5%
- Ukrainians: 9.8%
- Yakuts: 7.6%
- Tatars: 6.5%
- Buryats: 1.3%

== See also ==
- Lena Plateau
