= Mirny, Sakha Republic =

Mirny Мирный
- Town under republic jurisdiction

Other transcription(s)
  - Yakut: Мииринэй
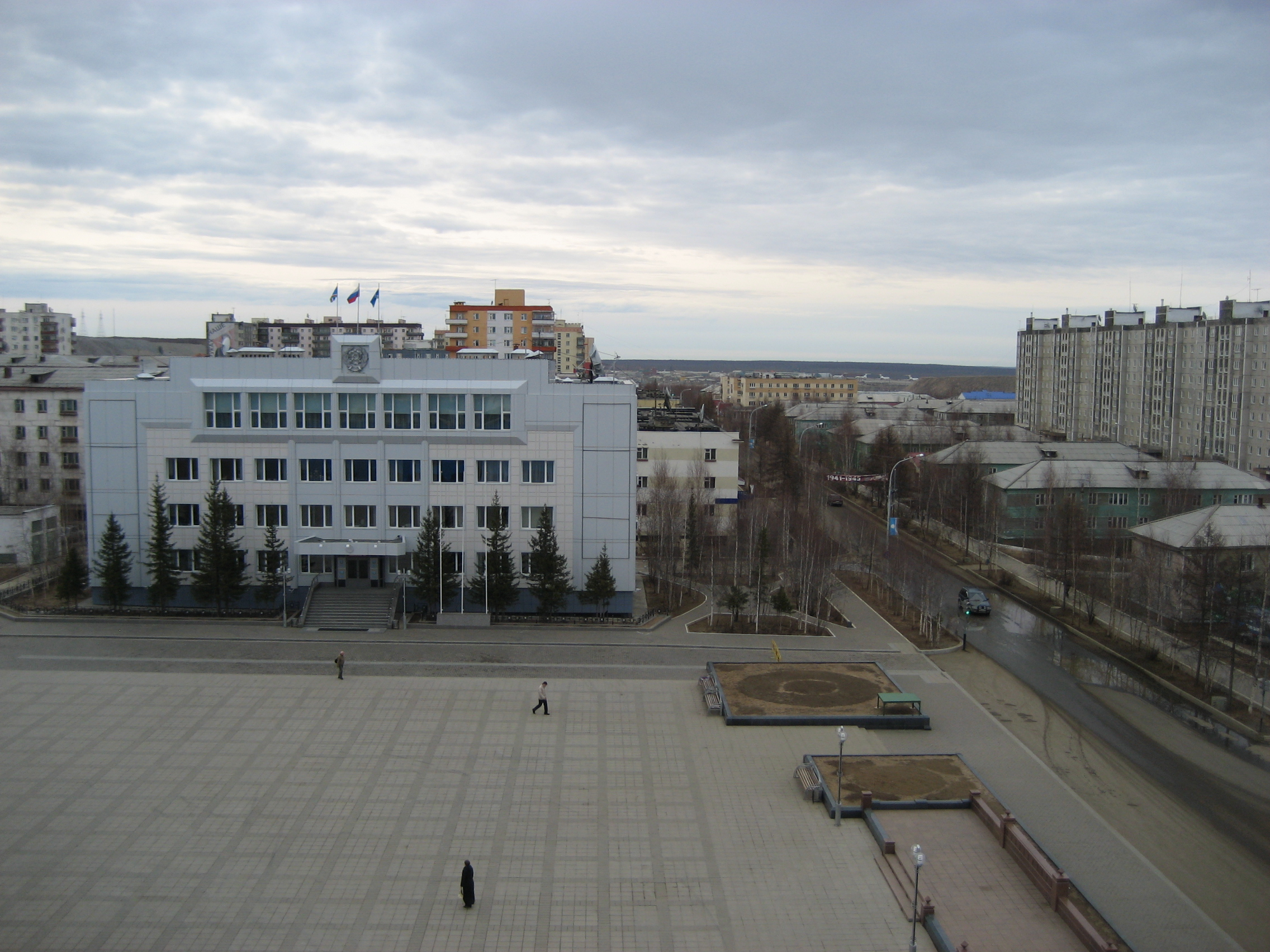
- Central square in Mirny

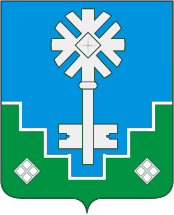
- Flag Coat of arms
- Interactive map of Mirny
- Location of Mirny Mirny (Sakha Republic)
- Coordinates: 62°33′N 113°58′E
- Country: Russia
- Federal subject: Sakha Republic
- Administrative district: Mirninsky District
- TownSelsoviet: Mirny
- Founded: 1955
- Town status since: 1959

Government
  - Head: Klim Antonov
- Elevation: 340 m (1,120 ft)

Population (2010 Census)
  - Total: 37,188
  - Estimate (2023): 34,013 (−8.5%)

Administrative status
  - Capital of: Mirninsky District, Town of Mirny

Municipal status
  - Municipal district: Mirninsky Municipal District
  - Urban settlement: Mirny Urban Settlement
  - Capital of: Mirninsky Municipal District, Mirny Urban Settlement
- Time zone: UTC+
- Postal codes: 678170–678175, 678179
- Dialing code: +7 41136
- OKTMO ID: 98631101001
- Website: www.gorodmirny.ru

Mirny (Russian: Мирный, IPA: [ˈmʲirnɨj], lit. peaceful; Yakut: Мииринэй, romanized: Miiriney [ˈmiːɾinej]) is a town and the administrative center of Mirninsky District in the Sakha Republic, Russia, located on the Irelyakh River (Vilyuy's basin), 820 kilometers (510 mi) west of Yakutsk, the capital of the republic. As of the 2010 Census, its population was 37,188.

Historical population
Year	Pop.	±%
1959	5,695	—
1970	23,826	+318.4%
1979	30,462	+27.9%
1989	38,793	+27.3%
2002	39,981	+3.1%
2010	37,188	−7.0%
2021	34,045	−8.5%
Source: Census data

== History ==
Mirny was founded in 1955 after the discovery of a nearby kimberlite pipe by an expedition led by Yury Khabardin. Town status was granted to it in 1959.

== Administrative and municipal status ==
Within the framework of administrative divisions, Mirny serves as the administrative center of Mirninsky District. As an inhabited locality, Mirny is classified as a town under republic jurisdiction. As an administrative division, it is incorporated within Mirninsky District as the Town of Mirny. As a municipal division, the Town of Mirny is incorporated within Mirninsky Municipal District as Mirny Urban Settlement.

== Climate ==
Mirny has an extreme subarctic climate, with short, warm summers, and long, severely cold winters. Like much of interior Siberia, the climate is pretty dry, but summer sees significantly more precipitation than other times of the year.

Climate data for Mirny (1991–2020, extremes 1959–present)
Month	Jan	Feb	Mar	Apr	May	Jun	Jul	Aug	Sep	Oct	Nov	Dec	Year
Record high °C (°F)	−4.0 (24.8)	0.7 (33.3)	9.9 (49.8)	17.5 (63.5)	31.6 (88.9)	34.1 (93.4)	35.4 (95.7)	36.7 (98.1)	26.0 (78.8)	17.7 (63.9)	3.7 (38.7)	−0.6 (30.9)	36.7 (98.1)
Mean daily maximum °C (°F)	−26.1 (−15.0)	−21.1 (−6.0)	−9.6 (14.7)	1.3 (34.3)	10.7 (51.3)	21.3 (70.3)	23.5 (74.3)	19.7 (67.5)	9.8 (49.6)	−2.7 (27.1)	−18.0 (−0.4)	−26.4 (−15.5)	−1.5 (29.4)
Daily mean °C (°F)	−35.2 (−31.4)	−27.2 (−17.0)	−18.4 (−1.1)	−4.3 (24.3)	5.1 (41.2)	14.9 (58.8)	17.6 (63.7)	13.7 (56.7)	5.0 (41.0)	−6.4 (20.5)	−21.6 (−6.9)	−29.9 (−21.8)	−7.2 (19.0)
Mean daily minimum °C (°F)	−39.8 (−39.6)	−33.9 (−29.0)	−22.9 (−9.2)	−9.8 (14.4)	0.1 (32.2)	8.9 (48.0)	11.9 (53.4)	8.5 (47.3)	1.0 (33.8)	−11.7 (10.9)	−27.5 (−17.5)	−36.3 (−33.3)	−12.6 (9.3)
Record low °C (°F)	−57.3 (−71.1)	−53.6 (−64.5)	−48.4 (−55.1)	−31.8 (−25.2)	−16.5 (2.3)	−5.5 (22.1)	−0.6 (30.9)	−4.2 (24.4)	−13.7 (7.3)	−33.4 (−28.1)	−50.1 (−58.2)	−54.6 (−66.3)	−57.3 (−71.1)
Average precipitation mm (inches)	12 (0.5)	10 (0.4)	13 (0.5)	14 (0.6)	27 (1.1)	44 (1.7)	55 (2.2)	50 (2.0)	33 (1.3)	30 (1.2)	21 (0.8)	13 (0.5)	322 (12.8)
Source: Погода и Климат

== Economy ==
The Mir mine is located within the town. It is an open pit mine, which, with the depth of 525 meters (1,722 ft) and a diameter of 1.25 kilometers (0.78 mi) is reckoned to be the second largest in the world. Production was stopped in 2004, and the mine was permanently closed in 2011, due to reduced recovery and the costs of working in the far northern climate.

=== Transportation ===
The town is served by the Mirny Airport. Safety concerns have been raised about aircraft operations near to the open diamond mine; helicopters are forbidden to pass over the abandoned workings.

== Education ==
The Mirny Polytechnic Institute, a branch of the North-Eastern Federal University, operates in the town.
