= Kirovo, Russia =

Kirovo (Russian: Кирово) is the name of several rural localities in Russia:

- Kirovo, Republic of Bashkortostan, a selo in Rassvetovsky Selsoviet of Davlekanovsky District in the Republic of Bashkortostan; 54°15′N 54°53′E
- Kirovo, Republic of Crimea, a selo in Leninsky District of the Republic of Crimea
- Kirovo, Jewish Autonomous Oblast, a selo in Leninsky District of the Jewish Autonomous Oblast
- Kirovo, Kaluga Oblast, a village in Iznoskovsky District of Kaluga Oblast
- Kirovo, Kemerovo Oblast, a village in Novoromanovskaya Rural Territory of Yurginsky District in Kemerovo Oblast; 55°42′N 85°25′E
- Kirovo, Altaysky District, Republic of Khakassia, a selo in Kirovsky Selsoviet of Altaysky District in the Republic of Khakassia
- Kirovo, Shirinsky District, Republic of Khakassia, a village in Chernoozerny Selsoviet of Shirinsky District in the Republic of Khakassia
- Kirovo, Tashtypsky District, Republic of Khakassia, a village in Arbatsky Selsoviet of Tashtypsky District in the Republic of Khakassia
- Kirovo, Kostroma Oblast, a settlement in Nikolskoye Settlement of Kostromskoy District in Kostroma Oblast; 57°48′N 41°12′E
- Kirovo, Belozersky District, Kurgan Oblast, a village in Svetlodolsky Selsoviet of Belozersky District in Kurgan Oblast; 55°46′N 65°20′E
- Kirovo, Mishkinsky District, Kurgan Oblast, a selo in Kirovsky Selsoviet of Mishkinsky District in Kurgan Oblast; 55°34′N 63°47′E
- Kirovo, Leningrad Oblast, a village in Begunitskoye Settlement Municipal Formation of Volosovsky District in Leningrad Oblast; 59°39′N 29°13′E
- Kirovo, Republic of North Ossetia-Alania, a selo in Kirovsky Rural Okrug of Ardonsky District in the Republic of North Ossetia-Alania; 43°11′N 44°25′E
- Kirovo, Oryol Oblast, a selo in Kirovsky Selsoviet of Soskovsky District in Oryol Oblast; 52°40′N 35°26′E
- Kirovo, Penza Oblast, a selo in Kirovsky Selsoviet of Serdobsky District in Penza Oblast
- Kirovo, Opochetsky District, Pskov Oblast, a village in Opochetsky District of Pskov Oblast
- Kirovo, Pechorsky District, Pskov Oblast, a village in Pechorsky District of Pskov Oblast
- Kirovo, Pskovsky District, Pskov Oblast, a village in Pskovsky District of Pskov Oblast
- Kirovo, Sakha Republic, a selo in Khagynsky Rural Okrug of Vilyuysky District in the Sakha Republic
- Kirovo, Balakovsky District, Saratov Oblast, a selo in Balakovsky District of Saratov Oblast
- Kirovo, Engelssky District, Saratov Oblast, a selo in Engelssky District of Saratov Oblast
- Kirovo, Krasnokutsky District, Saratov Oblast, a selo in Krasnokutsky District of Saratov Oblast
