= Kyunde =

Kyunde Кюнде Кыадаҥда (Sakha)
- Selo
- Interactive map of Kyunde
- Location of Kyunde Kyunde (Sakha Republic)
- Coordinates: 63°36′03″N 121°21′57″E
- Country: Russia
- Federal subject: Sakha Republic
- Administrative district: Vilyuysky District
- Rural okrugSelsoviet: Chochunsky Rural Okrug
- Elevation: 140 m (460 ft)

Population (2010 Census)
  - Total: 196
  - Estimate (2021): 207 (+5.6%)

Administrative status
  - Capital of: Chochunsky Rural Okrug

Municipal status
  - Municipal district: Vilyuysky Municipal District
  - Rural settlement: Chochunsky Rural Settlement
  - Capital of: Chochunsky Rural Settlement
- Time zone: UTC+
- Postal code: 678206
- OKTMO ID: 98618470106

Kyunde (Russian: Кюнде; Yakut: Кыадаҥда, romanized: Kıadañda) is a rural locality (a selo), one of two settlements, in addition to Sydybyl, the administrative centre of the Rural Okrug, in Chochunsky Rural Okrug of Vilyuysky District in the Sakha Republic, Russia. It is located 28 kilometers (17 mi) from Vilyuysk, and 6 kilometers (3.7 mi) from Sydybyl the administrative center of the district. Its population as of the 2010 Census was 196, of whom 100 were male and 96 female, down from 229 as recorded during the 2002 Census.
