= Satagay =

Satagay (Russian: Сатагай) is the name of several rural localities in the Sakha Republic, Russia:

- Satagay, Amginsky District, Sakha Republic, a selo in Satagaysky Rural Okrug of Amginsky District
- Satagay, Vilyuysky District, Sakha Republic, a selo in Kyrgydaysky Rural Okrug of Vilyuysky District
