= Vilyuysk (disambiguation) =

Vilyuysk is a town in the Sakha Republic, Russia.

Vilyuysk may also refer to:

- Vilyuysk Urban Settlement, a municipal formation which includes the Town of Vilyuysk, Sakha Republic, Russia
- Vilyuysk Airport, an airport in the Sakha Republic Russia
- 2890 Vilyujsk, a main-belt asteroid

== See also ==
- Vilyuy (disambiguation)
