= Chybyda =

River in Yakutia, Russia

Chybyda Чыбыда / Чыбыыда
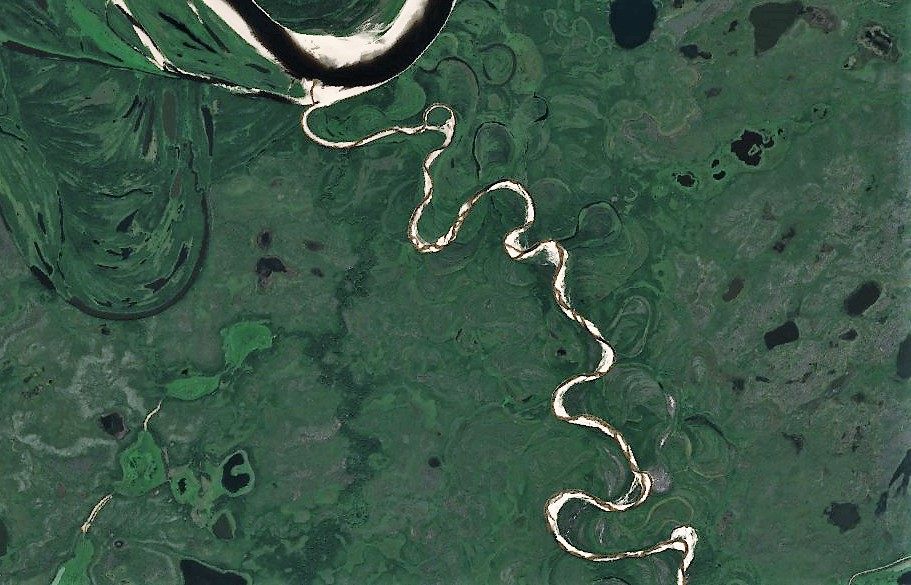
- Confluence with the Vilyuy Sentinel-2 image

- Mouth location in Yakutia, Russia

Location
- Country: Yakutia, Russia

Physical characteristics
- Source
  - location: Lena Plateau
  - coordinates: 62°17′06″N 121°08′34″E
- Mouth: Vilyuy
  - coordinates: 63°41′40″N 121°02′30″E
  - elevation: 91 m (299 ft)
- Length: 451 km (280 mi)
- Basin size: 9,960 km^{2} (3,850 sq mi)

Basin features
- Progression: Vilyuy→ Lena→ Laptev Sea

The Chybyda (Russian: Чыбыда; Yakut: Чыбыыда, romanized: Çıbııda) is a river in Yakutia (Sakha Republic), Russia. It is a right hand tributary of the Vilyuy, with a length of 451 kilometres (280 mi) and a drainage basin area of 9,960 square kilometres (3,850 mi^{2}).

The river flows across practically uninhabited territory of Vilyuysky District. Its confluence with the Vilyuy lies approximately 30 km (19 mi) upstream from Vilyuysk.

== Course ==
The Chybyda begins in the southern sector of the Lena Plateau. It flows roughly in a northward and northwestward direction along most of its course. After it descends into the Central Yakutian Lowland it meanders strongly. Finally it joins the right bank of the Vilyuy 365 kilometres (227 mi) from its mouth. The river is fed by snow and rain. It freezes in mid October and stays under ice until the second half of May.

=== Tributaries ===
The Chybyda has some very long tributaries, such as the 229 kilometres (142 mi) long Byrykan (Бырыыкаан) and the 114 kilometres (71 mi) long Sergelyakh (Сергелях) from the left, as well as the 193 kilometres (120 mi) long Tymtaidakh (Тымтайдах) from the right.

== See also ==
- List of rivers of Russia
