= Arylakh, Vilyuysky District, Sakha Republic =

Arylakh Арылах Арыылаах (Sakha)
- Selo
- Interactive map of Arylakh
- Location of Arylakh Arylakh (Sakha Republic)
- Coordinates: 62°41′N 124°32′E
- Country: Russia
- Federal subject: Sakha Republic
- Administrative district: Vilyuysky District
- Rural okrugSelsoviet: Bappagayinsky Rural Okrug

Population (2010 Census)
  - Total: 0
  - Estimate (2021): 0 )

Municipal status
  - Municipal district: Vilyuysky Municipal District
  - Rural settlement: Bappagayinsky Rural Settlement
- Time zone: UTC+
- Postal code: 678225
- OKTMO ID: 98618408106

Arylakh (Russian: Арылах; Yakut: Арыылаах, Arıılaax) is a rural locality (a selo) in Bappagayinsky Rural Okrug of Vilyuysky District in the Sakha Republic, Russia, located 230 kilometers (140 mi) from Vilyuysk, the administrative center of the district and 22 kilometers (14 mi) from Ilbenge, the administrative center of the rural okrug. Its population as of the 2010 Census was 0, the same as recorded during the 2002 Census.
