= Chay, Russia =

Chay Чай Чай (Yakut)
- Selo
- Interactive map of Chay
- Location of Chay Chay (Sakha Republic)
- Coordinates: 63°51′N 123°32′E
- Country: Russia
- Federal subject: Sakha Republic
- Administrative district: Vilyuysky District
- Rural okrugSelsoviet: Borogonsky Rural Okrug

Population (2010 Census)
  - Total: 479
  - Estimate (2021): 430 (−10.2%)

Administrative status
  - Capital of: Borogonsky Rural Okrug

Municipal status
  - Municipal district: Vilyuysky Municipal District
  - Rural settlement: Borogonsky Rural Settlement
  - Capital of: Borogonsky Rural Settlement
- Time zone: UTC+
- Postal code: 678215
- OKTMO ID: 98618416101

Chay (Russian: Чай; Yakut: Чай, Çay) is a rural locality (a selo) and the administrative center of Borogonsky Rural Okrug in Vilyuysky District of the Sakha Republic, Russia, located 117 kilometers (73 mi) from Vilyuysk, the administrative center of the district. Its population as of the 2010 Census was 479; up from 478 recorded in the 2002 Census.
