= Balagachchy =

Balagachchy Балагаччы Балаҕаччы (Sakha)
- Selo
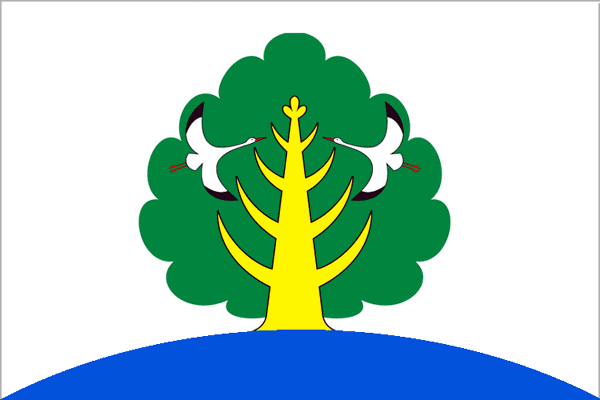
- Flag
- Interactive map of Balagachchy
- Location of Balagachchy Balagachchy (Sakha Republic)
- Coordinates: 64°23′31″N 122°14′18″E
- Country: Russia
- Federal subject: Sakha Republic
- Administrative district: Vilyuysky District
- Rural okrugSelsoviet: Togussky Rural Okrug
- Founded: 1878

Population (2010 Census)
  - Total: 601
  - Estimate (2021): 554 (−7.8%)

Administrative status
  - Capital of: Togussky Rural Okrug

Municipal status
  - Municipal district: Vilyuysky Municipal District
  - Rural settlement: Togussky Rural Settlement
  - Capital of: Togussky Rural Settlement
- Time zone: UTC+
- Postal code: 678211
- OKTMO ID: 98618449101

Balagachchy (Russian: Балагаччы; Yakut: Балаҕаччы, Balağaççı) is a rural locality (a selo), the administrative centre of and one of two settlements, in addition to Seyat, in Togussky Rural Okrug of Vilyuysky District in the Sakha Republic, Russia. It is located 110 kilometers (68 mi) from Vilyuysk, the administrative center of the district. Its population as of the 2010 Census was 601, of whom 288 were male and 313 female, down from 668 as recorded during the 2002 Census.
