= Chineke =

Chineke Чинеке Чинэкэ (Sakha)
- Selo
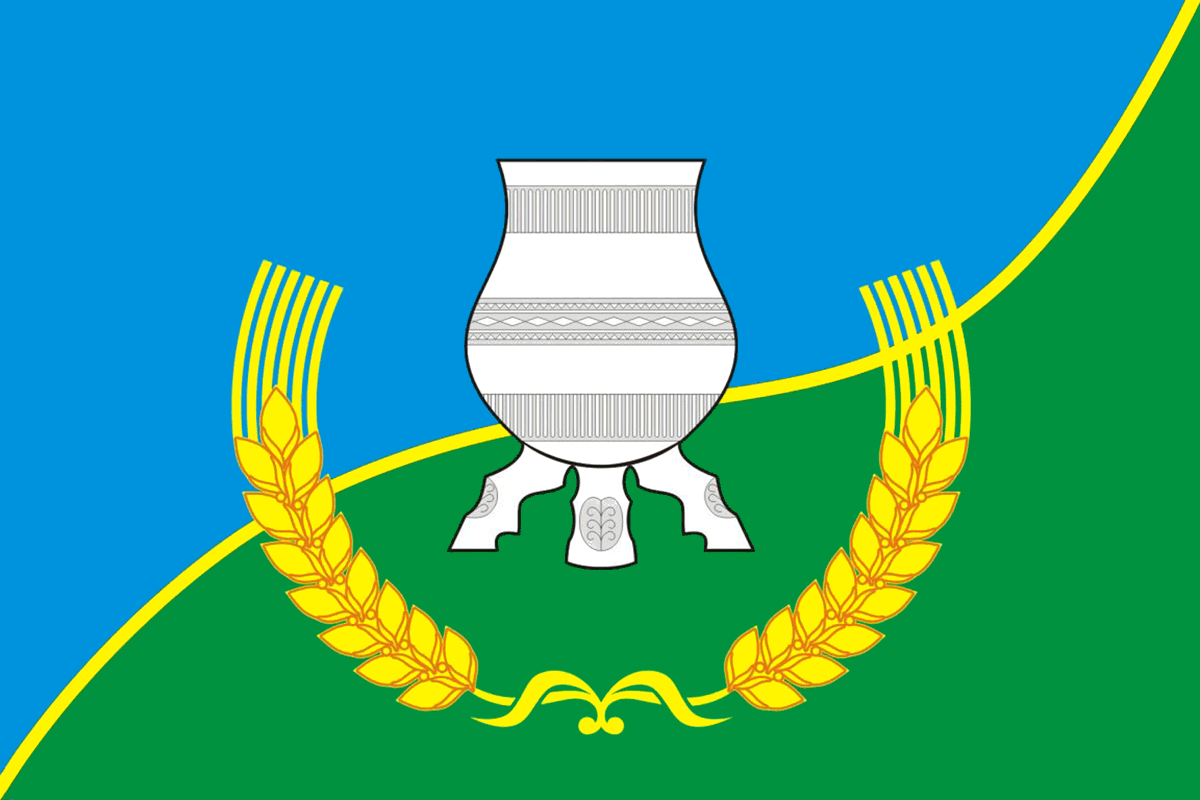
- Flag
- Interactive map of Chineke
- Location of Chineke Chineke (Sakha Republic)
- Coordinates: 63°43′N 121°57′E
- Country: Russia
- Federal subject: Sakha Republic
- Administrative district: Vilyuysky District
- Rural okrugSelsoviet: Chernyshevsky Rural Okrug

Population (2010 Census)
  - Total: 945
  - Estimate (2021): 868 (−8.1%)

Administrative status
  - Capital of: Chernyshevsky Rural Okrug

Municipal status
  - Municipal district: Vilyuysky Municipal District
  - Rural settlement: Chernyshevsky Rural Settlement
  - Capital of: Chernyshevsky Rural Settlement
- Time zone: UTC+
- Postal code: 678207
- OKTMO ID: 98618466101

Chineke (Russian: Чинеке; Yakut: Чинэкэ, Çineke) is a rural locality (a selo), the only inhabited locality, and the administrative center of Chernyshevsky Rural Okrug of Vilyuysky District in the Sakha Republic, Russia, located 20 kilometers (12 mi) from Vilyuysk, the administrative center of the district. Its population as of the 2010 Census was 945, down from 984 recorded during the 2002 Census.
