= Sortol =

Sortol Сортол Сортуол (Sakha)
- Selo
- Interactive map of Sortol
- Location of Sortol Sortol (Sakha Republic)
- Coordinates: 62°49′N 124°41′E
- Country: Russia
- Federal subject: Sakha Republic
- Administrative district: Vilyuysky District
- Rural okrugSelsoviet: Bappagayinsky Rural Okrug

Population (2010 Census)
  - Total: 0
  - Estimate (2010): 0 )

Municipal status
  - Municipal district: Vilyuysky Municipal District
  - Rural settlement: Bappagayinsky Rural Settlement
- Time zone: UTC+
- Postal code: 678228
- OKTMO ID: 98618408111

Sortol (Russian: Сортол; Yakut: Сортуол) is a rural locality (a selo) in Bappagayinsky Rural Okrug of Vilyuysky District in the Sakha Republic, Russia, located 235 kilometers (146 mi) from Vilyuysk, the administrative center of the district, and 20 kilometers (12 mi) from Ilbenge, the administrative center of the rural okrug. Its population as of the 2010 Census was 0, the same as recorded during the 2002 Census.
