= Terbyas =

Terbyas Тербяс Тылгыны (Sakha)
- Selo
- Interactive map of Terbyas
- Location of Terbyas Terbyas (Sakha Republic)
- Coordinates: 64°22′22″N 120°32′58″E
- Country: Russia
- Federal subject: Sakha Republic
- Administrative district: Vilyuysky District
- Rural okrugSelsoviet: Tylgyninsky Rural Okrug

Population (2010 Census)
  - Total: 644
  - Estimate (2021): 626 (−2.8%)

Administrative status
  - Capital of: Tylgyninsky Rural Okrug

Municipal status
  - Municipal district: Vilyuysky Municipal District
  - Rural settlement: Tylgyninsky Rural Settlement
  - Capital of: Tylgyninsky Rural Settlement
- Time zone: UTC+
- Postal code: 678220
- OKTMO ID: 98618453101

Terbyas (Russian: Тербяс; Yakut: Тылгыны, Tılgını) is a rural locality (a selo), the only inhabited locality, and the administrative center of Tylgyninsky Rural Okrug of Vilyuysky District in the Sakha Republic, Russia, located 180 kilometers (110 mi) from Vilyuysk, the administrative center of the district. Its population as of the 2010 Census was 644, of whom 300 were male and 344 female, down from 710 as recorded during the 2002 Census.
