= Tympy =

Tympy Тымпы Тыымпы (Sakha)
- Selo
- Interactive map of Tympy
- Location of Tympy Tympy (Sakha Republic)
- Coordinates: 63°50′04″N 123°23′06″E
- Country: Russia
- Federal subject: Sakha Republic
- Administrative district: Vilyuysky District
- Rural okrugSelsoviet: Pervyy Togussky Rural Okrug

Population (2010 Census)
  - Total: 534
  - Estimate (2021): 483 (−9.6%)

Administrative status
  - Capital of: Pervyy Togussky Rural Okrug

Municipal status
  - Municipal district: Vilyuysky Municipal District
  - Rural settlement: Pervyy Togussky Rural Settlement
  - Capital of: Pervyy Togussky Rural Settlement
- Time zone: UTC+
- Postal code: 678216
- OKTMO ID: 98618435101

Tympy (Russian: Тымпы; Yakut: Тыымпы, Tıımpı) is a rural locality (a selo), the only inhabited locality, and the administrative center of Pervyy Togussky Rural Okrug of Vilyuysky District in the Sakha Republic, Russia, located 104 kilometers (65 mi) from Vilyuysk, the administrative center of the district. Its population as of the 2010 Census was 534 of whom 268 were male and 266 female, down from 562 as recorded during the 2002 Census.
