= Betyung =

Betyung Бетюнг Бөтүҥ (Yakut)
- Selo
- Interactive map of Betyung
- Location of Betyung Betyung (Sakha Republic)
- Coordinates: 63°42′N 122°20′E
- Country: Russia
- Federal subject: Sakha Republic
- Administrative district: Vilyuysky District
- Rural okrugSelsoviet: Byokchyoginsky Rural Okrug

Population (2010 Census)
  - Total: 477
  - Estimate (2021): 407 (−14.7%)

Administrative status
  - Capital of: Byokchyoginsky Rural Okrug

Municipal status
  - Municipal district: Vilyuysky Municipal District
  - Rural settlement: Byokchyoginsky Rural Settlement
  - Capital of: Byokchyoginsky Rural Settlement
- Time zone: UTC+
- Postal code: 678208
- OKTMO ID: 98618412101

Betyung (Russian: Бетюнг; Yakut: Бөтүҥ, Bötüŋ) is a rural locality (a selo) and the administrative center of Byokchyoginsky Rural Okrug in Vilyuysky District of the Sakha Republic, Russia, located 59 kilometers (37 mi) from Vilyuysk, the administrative center of the district. Its population as of the 2010 Census was 477; down from 563 recorded in the 2002 Census.
