= Kirovo =

Kirovo may refer to:

- Kirovo, Bulgaria, a village in Burgas Province, Bulgaria
- Kirovo, Kazakhstan, a village in Almaty Province, Kazakhstan
- Kirovo, Russia, several rural localities in Russia

== See also ==
- Kirove (disambiguation), localities in Ukraine
