= Lyokyochyon =

Lyokyochyon Лёкёчён Лөкөчөөн (Sakha)
- Selo
- Interactive map of Lyokyochyon
- Location of Lyokyochyon Lyokyochyon (Sakha Republic)
- Coordinates: 63°04′N 123°59′E
- Country: Russia
- Federal subject: Sakha Republic
- Administrative district: Vilyuysky District
- Rural okrugSelsoviet: Lyokyochyonsky Rural Okrug

Population (2010 Census)
  - Total: 428
  - Estimate (2021): 436 (+1.9%)

Administrative status
  - Capital of: Lyokyochyonsky Rural Okrug

Municipal status
  - Municipal district: Vilyuysky Municipal District
  - Rural settlement: Lyokyochyonsky Rural Settlement
  - Capital of: Lyokyochyonsky Rural Settlement
- Time zone: UTC+
- Postal code: 678205
- OKTMO ID: 98618433101

Lyokyochyon (Russian: Лёкёчён; Yakut: Лөкөчөөн, Lököçöön) is a rural locality (a selo), the only inhabited locality, and the administrative center of Lyokyochyonsky Rural Okrug of Vilyuysky District in the Sakha Republic, Russia, located 179 kilometers (111 mi) from Vilyuysk, the administrative center of the district. Its population as of the 2010 Census was 428, up from 400 as recorded during the 2002 Census.
