= Khampa, Russia =

Khampa Хампа Хампа (Sakha)
- Selo
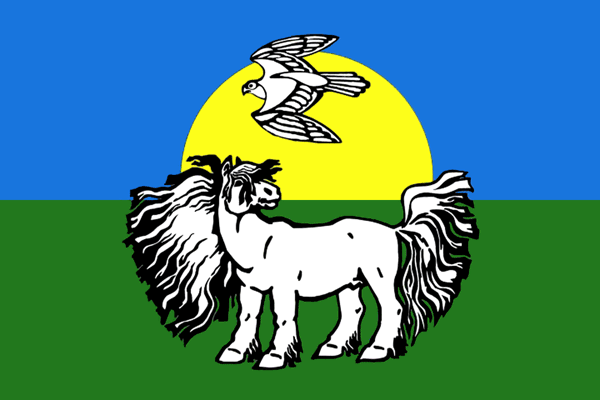
- Flag
- Interactive map of Khampa
- Location of Khampa Khampa (Sakha Republic)
- Coordinates: 63°44′32″N 122°56′45″E
- Country: Russia
- Federal subject: Sakha Republic
- Administrative district: Vilyuysky District
- Rural okrugSelsoviet: Arylakhsky Rural Okrug

Population (2010 Census)
  - Total: 1,051
  - Estimate (2021): 1,012 (−3.7%)

Administrative status
  - Capital of: Arylakhsky Rural Okrug

Municipal status
  - Municipal district: Vilyuysky Municipal District
  - Rural settlement: Arylakhsky Rural Settlement
  - Capital of: Arylakhsky Rural Settlement
- Time zone: UTC+
- Postal code: 678225
- OKTMO ID: 98618404101

Khampa (Russian: Хампа; Yakut: Хампа, Xampa) is a rural locality (a selo), the only inhabited locality, and the administrative center of Arylakhsky Rural Okrug of Vilyuysky District in the Sakha Republic, Russia, located 73 kilometers (45 mi) from Vilyuysk, the administrative center of the district. Its population as of the 2010 Census was 1,051, of whom 511 were male and 540 female, down from 1,116 as recorded during the 2002 Census.
