= Usun =

Usun Усун Уһун (Sakha)
- Selo
- Interactive map of Usun
- Location of Usun Usun (Sakha Republic)
- Coordinates: 64°31′N 121°03′E
- Country: Russia
- Federal subject: Sakha Republic
- Administrative district: Vilyuysky District
- Rural okrugSelsoviet: Kyuletsky 1-y Rural Okrug

Population (2010 Census)
  - Total: 1,051
  - Estimate (2021): 801 (−23.8%)

Administrative status
  - Capital of: Kyuletsky 1-y Rural Okrug

Municipal status
  - Municipal district: Vilyuysky Municipal District
  - Rural settlement: Kyuletsky 1-y Rural Settlement
  - Capital of: Kyuletsky 1-y Rural Settlement
- Time zone: UTC+
- Postal code: 678222
- OKTMO ID: 98618430101

Usun (Russian: Усун; Yakut: Уһун, Uhun) is a rural locality (a selo), the only inhabited locality, and the administrative center of Kyuletsky 1-y Rural Okrug (Russian pronunciation: [kʲʉˈlʲɛtskʲɪj ˈpʲɛrvɨj]) in Vilyuysky District of the Sakha Republic, Russia, located 140 kilometers (87 mi) from Vilyuysk, the administrative center of the district. Its population as of the 2010 Census was 801, up from 743 recorded during the 2002 Census.

== Facilities ==
It has a high school, agricultural enterprise, kindergarten, shop, communication center, district hospital, and bank.
