= Starovatovo =

Starovatovo Староватово Староватово (Yakut)
- Selo
- Interactive map of Starovatovo
- Location of Starovatovo Starovatovo (Sakha Republic)
- Coordinates: 63°47′N 121°38′E
- Country: Russia
- Federal subject: Sakha Republic
- Administrative district: Vilyuysky District
- Rural okrugSelsoviet: Khalbakinsky Rural Okrug

Population (2010 Census)
  - Total: 78
  - Estimate (2021): 71 (−9%)

Administrative status
  - Capital of: Khalbakinsky Rural Okrug

Municipal status
  - Municipal district: Vilyuysky Municipal District
  - Rural settlement: Khalbakinsky Rural Settlement
  - Capital of: Khalbakinsky Rural Settlement
- Time zone: UTC+
- Postal code: 678213
- OKTMO ID: 98618462106

Starovatovo (Russian: Староватово; Yakut: Староватово) is a rural locality (a selo) in Khalbakinsky Rural Okrug of Vilyuysky District in the Sakha Republic, Russia, 12 kilometers (7.5 mi) from Vilyuysk, the administrative center of the district, and 6 kilometers (3.7 mi) from Tosu, the administrative center of the rural okrug. Its population as of the 2010 Census was 78, down from 93 recorded during the 2002 Census.
