= Kysyl-Syr, Vilyuysky District, Sakha Republic =

Kysyl-Syr Кысыл-Сыр
- Urban-type settlement

Other transcription(s)
  - Yakut: Кыһыл Сыыр
- Interactive map of Kysyl-Syr
- Location of Kysyl-Syr Kysyl-Syr (Sakha Republic)
- Coordinates: 63°54′N 122°46′E
- Country: Russia
- Federal subject: Sakha Republic
- Administrative district: Vilyuysky District
- SettlementSelsoviet: Settlement of Kysyl-Syr
- Founded: 1961
- Urban-type settlement status since: 1974

Population (2010 Census)
  - Total: 3,106
  - Estimate (2023): 2,798 (−9.9%)

Administrative status
  - Capital of: Settlement of Kysyl-Syr

Municipal status
  - Municipal district: Vilyuysky Municipal District
  - Urban settlement: Kysyl-Syr Urban Settlement
  - Capital of: Kysyl-Syr Urban Settlement
- Time zone: UTC+
- Postal code: 678214
- OKTMO ID: 98618153051

Kysyl-Syr population
- 2010 Census: 3,106
- 2002 Census: 3,609
- 1989 Census: 7,248
- 1979 Census: 5,576

Kysyl-Syr (Russian: Кысыл-Сыр; Yakut: Кыһыл Сыыр, Kıhıl Sıır) is an urban locality (an urban-type settlement) in Vilyuysky District of the Sakha Republic, Russia, located 73 kilometers (45 mi) from Vilyuysk, the administrative center of the district. As of the 2010 Census, its population was 3,106.

== History ==
Urban-type settlement status was granted to it in 1974.

== Administrative and municipal status ==
Within the framework of administrative divisions, the urban-type settlement of Kysyl-Syr is incorporated within Vilyuysky District as the Settlement of Kysyl-Syr. As a municipal division, the Settlement of Kysyl-Syr is incorporated within Vilyuysky Municipal District as Kysyl-Syr Urban Settlement.
