= Kyubyainde =

Kyubyainde Кюбяинде Күбэйиҥдэ (Sakha)
- Selo
- Interactive map of Kyubyainde
- Location of Kyubyainde Kyubyainde (Sakha Republic)
- Coordinates: 64°37′39″N 120°13′25″E
- Country: Russia
- Federal subject: Sakha Republic
- Administrative district: Vilyuysky District
- Rural okrugSelsoviet: Yugyulyatsky Rural Okrug
- Founded: 1911
- Elevation: 140 m (460 ft)

Population (2010 Census)
  - Total: 619
  - Estimate (2021): 560 (−9.5%)

Administrative status
  - Capital of: Yugyulyatsky Rural Okrug

Municipal status
  - Municipal district: Vilyuysky Municipal District
  - Rural settlement: Yugyulyatsky Rural Settlement
  - Capital of: Yugyulyatsky Rural Settlement
- Time zone: UTC+
- Postal code: 678221
- OKTMO ID: 98618474101

Kyubyainde (Russian: Кюбяинде; Yakut: Күбэйиҥдэ, Kübeyiŋde) is a rural locality (a selo), the only inhabited locality, and the administrative center of Yugyulyatsky Rural Okrug of Vilyuysky District in the Sakha Republic, Russia, located 200 kilometers (120 mi) from Vilyuysk, the administrative center of the district. Its population as of the 2010 Census was 619, of whom 324 were male and 295 female, up from 600 as recorded during the 2002 Census.
