= Vilyuy (disambiguation) =

Vilyuy may refer to:

- Vilyuy, a river in Siberia, Russia
- Vilyuy Plateau
- Vilyuy Dam
- Vilyuy District
- Vilyuy Lowland
- Vilyuy Syneclise
- Ust-Vilyuy Range

== See also ==
- Vilyuysk (disambiguation)
