= Yekyundyu =

Yekyundyu Екюндю Өкүндү (Sakha)
- Selo
- Interactive map of Yekyundyu
- Location of Yekyundyu Yekyundyu (Sakha Republic)
- Coordinates: 63°47′N 122°10′E
- Country: Russia
- Federal subject: Sakha Republic
- Administrative district: Vilyuysky District
- Rural okrugSelsoviet: Yekyundinsky Rural Okrug

Population (2010 Census)
  - Total: 321
  - Estimate (2021): 277 (−13.7%)

Administrative status
  - Capital of: Yekyundinsky Rural Okrug

Municipal status
  - Municipal district: Vilyuysky Municipal District
  - Rural settlement: Yekyundinsky Rural Settlement
  - Capital of: Yekyundinsky Rural Settlement
- Time zone: UTC+
- Postal code: 678226
- OKTMO ID: 98618418101

Yekyundyu (Russian: Екюндю; Yakut: Өкүндү, Ökündü) is a rural locality (a selo), the only inhabited locality, and the administrative center of Yekyundinsky Rural Okrug of Vilyuysky District in the Sakha Republic, Russia, located 28 kilometers (17 mi) from Vilyuysk, the administrative center of the district. Its population as of the 2010 Census was 321, down from 326 as recorded during the 2002 Census.
