= Tasagar =

Tasagar Тасагар Тааһаҕар (Sakha)
- Selo
- Interactive map of Tasagar
- Location of Tasagar Tasagar (Sakha Republic)
- Coordinates: 63°46′01″N 122°40′42″E
- Country: Russia
- Federal subject: Sakha Republic
- Administrative district: Vilyuysky District
- Rural okrugSelsoviet: Tasagarsky Rural Okrug

Population (2010 Census)
  - Total: 544
  - Estimate (2021): 555 (+2%)

Administrative status
  - Capital of: Tasagarsky Rural Okrug

Municipal status
  - Municipal district: Vilyuysky Municipal District
  - Rural settlement: Tasagarsky Rural Settlement
  - Capital of: Tasagarsky Rural Settlement
- Time zone: UTC+
- Postal code: 678209
- OKTMO ID: 98618445101

Tasagar (Russian: Тасагар; Yakut: Тааһаҕар, Taahağar) is a rural locality (a selo), the only inhabited locality, and the administrative center of Tasagarsky Rural Okrug of Vilyuysky District in the Sakha Republic, Russia, located 57 kilometers (35 mi) from Vilyuysk, the administrative center of the district. Its population as of the 2010 Census was 544, of whom 277 were male and 267 female, down from 571 as recorded during the 2002 Census.
