= Tosu =

Tosu or tOSU may refer to:

== Cities ==
- Tosu, Russia, a selo (village) in Vilyuysky District, Sakha Republic
- Tosu, Saga, a city in Japan
  - Sagan Tosu, an association football club in Tosu, Saga
  - Shin-Tosu Station, a railway station in Tosu, Saga
  - Tosu Futures, a former football club in Tosu, Saga
  - Tosu Stadium, a football stadium in Tosu, Saga
  - Tosu Station, a railway station in Tosu, Saga
- Tosu language, in the Qiangic and Tibeto-Burman language groups
- Toșu, a Romanian surname

== Universities ==
- Ohio State University, from a marketing tactic used by the university to refer to it as "The Ohio State University".
