= Ilbenge =

Ilbenge Илбенге Илбэҥэ (Sakha)
- Selo
- Interactive map of Ilbenge
- Location of Ilbenge Ilbenge (Sakha Republic)
- Coordinates: 62°49′45″N 124°12′30″E
- Country: Russia
- Federal subject: Sakha Republic
- Administrative district: Vilyuysky District
- Rural okrugSelsoviet: Bappagayinsky Rural Okrug

Population (2010 Census)
  - Total: 651
  - Estimate (2021): 637 (−2.2%)

Administrative status
  - Capital of: Bappagayinsky Rural Okrug

Municipal status
  - Municipal district: Vilyuysky Municipal District
  - Rural settlement: Bappagayinsky Rural Settlement
  - Capital of: Bappagayinsky Rural Settlement
- Time zone: UTC+
- Postal code: 678228
- OKTMO ID: 98618408101

Ilbenge (Russian: Илбенге; Yakut: Илбэҥэ, İlbeŋe) is a rural locality (a selo), the administrative centre of and one of three settlements, in addition to Arylakh and Sortol, in Bappagayinsky Rural Okrug of Vilyuysky District in the Sakha Republic, Russia. It is located 215 kilometers (134 mi) from Vilyuysk, the administrative center of the district. Its population as of the 2010 Census was 651. of whom 306 were male and 345 female, down from 685 as recorded during the 2002 Census.
