= Ebya, Vilyuysky District, Sakha Republic =

Ebya Эбя Эбэ (Sakha)
- Selo
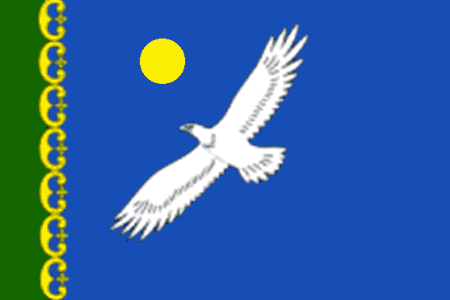
- Flag
- Interactive map of Ebya
- Location of Ebya Ebya (Sakha Republic)
- Coordinates: 63°29′N 123°10′E
- Country: Russia
- Federal subject: Sakha Republic
- Administrative district: Vilyuysky District
- Rural okrugSelsoviet: Zhemkonsky Rural Okrug

Population (2010 Census)
  - Total: 483
  - Estimate (2021): 454 (−6%)

Administrative status
  - Capital of: Zhemkonsky Rural Okrug

Municipal status
  - Municipal district: Vilyuysky Municipal District
  - Rural settlement: Zhemkonsky Rural Settlement
  - Capital of: Zhemkonsky Rural Settlement
- Time zone: UTC+
- Postal code: 678227
- OKTMO ID: 98618420101

Ebya (Russian: Эбя; Yakut: Эбэ, Ebe) is a rural locality (a selo), the only inhabited locality, and the administrative center of Zhemkonsky Rural Okrug of Vilyuysky District in the Sakha Republic, Russia, located 106 kilometers (66 mi) from Vilyuysk, the administrative center of the district. Its population as of the 2010 Census was 483, up from 472 recorded during the 2002 Census.
