= Kyulekyan =

Kyulekyan Кюлекянь Күүлэкээн (Sakha)
- Selo
- Interactive map of Kyulekyan
- Location of Kyulekyan Kyulekyan (Sakha Republic)
- Coordinates: 64°49′53″N 120°55′41″E
- Country: Russia
- Federal subject: Sakha Republic
- Administrative district: Vilyuysky District
- Rural okrugSelsoviet: Kyuletsky 2-y Rural Okrug

Population (2010 Census)
  - Total: 412
  - Estimate (2021): 375 (−9%)

Administrative status
  - Capital of: Kyuletsky 2-y Rural Okrug

Municipal status
  - Municipal district: Vilyuysky Municipal District
  - Rural settlement: Kyuletsky 2-y Rural Settlement
  - Capital of: Kyuletsky 2-y Rural Settlement
- Time zone: UTC+
- Postal code: 678223
- OKTMO ID: 98618431101

Kyulekyan (Russian: Кюлекянь; Yakut: Күүлэкээн, Küülekeen) is a rural locality (a selo), the only inhabited locality, and the administrative center of Kyuletsky 2-y Rural Okrug (pronounced Kyulyetskey Vtoroy Rural Okrug) of Vilyuysky District in the Sakha Republic, Russia, located 185 kilometers (115 mi) from Vilyuysk, the administrative center of the district. Its population as of the 2010 Census was 412, of whom 209 were male and 203 female, down from 428 as recorded during the 2002 Census.
