= Vilyuysk Airport =

Vilyuisk Airport
- IATA: VYI; ICAO: UENW; LID: ВИК

Summary
- Airport type: Public
- Serves: Vilyuysk, Vilyuysky District, Sakha Republic, Russia
- Elevation AMSL: 110 m / 361 ft
- Coordinates: 63°45′22″N 121°41′39″E

Maps
- Sakha Republic in Russia

- Location of the airport in the Sakha Republic

Runways
Direction	Length		Surface
Direction	m	ft	Surface
12/30	1,600	5,249	Concrete
- Sources: GCM, STV

Vilyuisk Airport (Russian: Аэропорт Вилюйск) (IATA: VYI, ICAO: UENW) is an airport serving, and located 3 kilometres (1.9 mi) east of, the urban locality of Vilyuysk, Vilyuysky District, in the Sakha Republic of Russia. It accommodates small transport aircraft.

== Airlines and destinations ==
Airlines	Destinations
Polar Airlines	Yakutsk

== See also ==
- List of airports in Russia
