= Bexhill Museum =

Local history museum in Bexhill-on-Sea, England

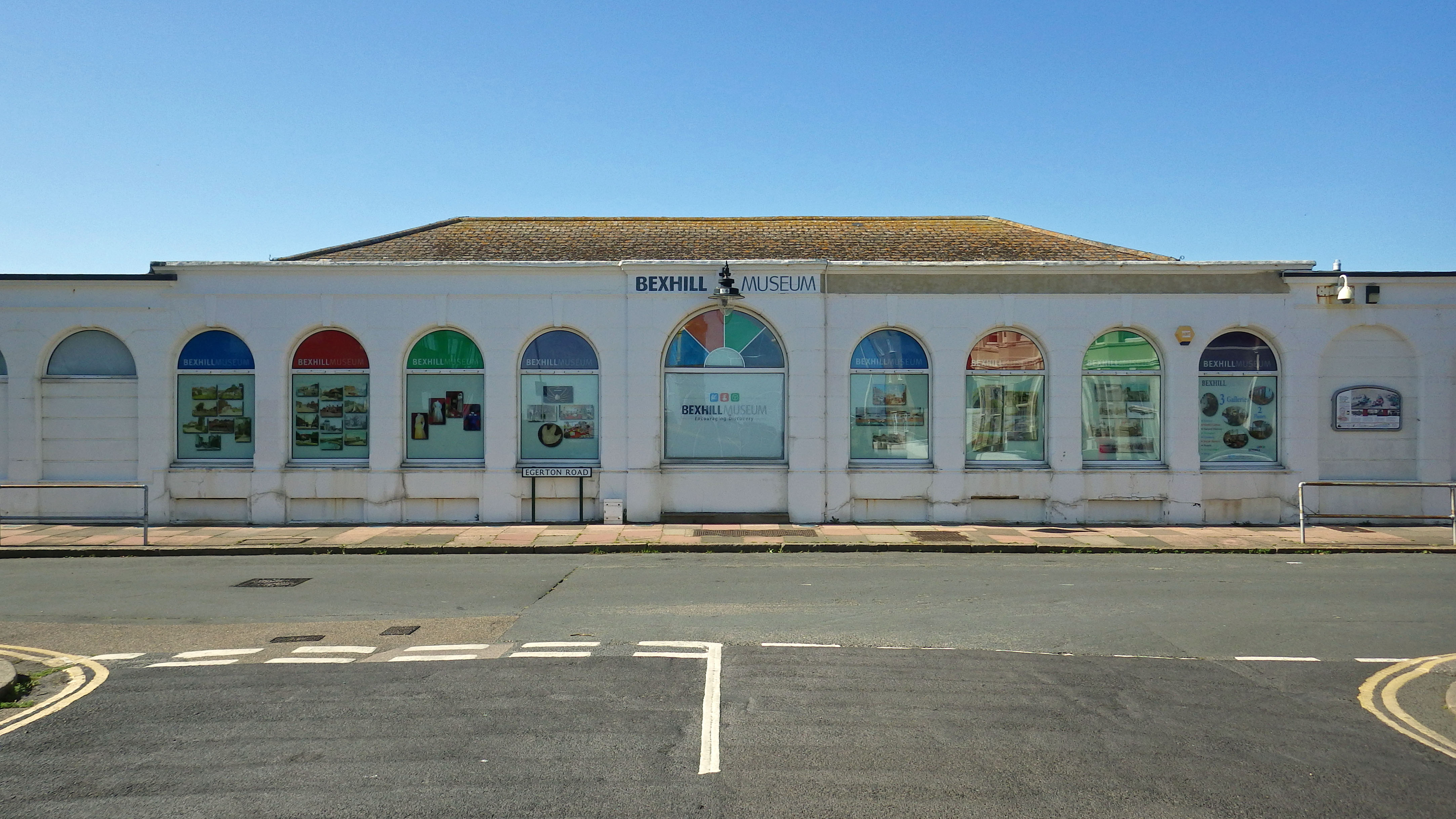
- "Encouraging Discovery"
- Established: 22 May 1914
- Location: Egerton Park, Bexhill-on-Sea
- Coordinates: 50.83740°N 0.46595°E
- Collections: The Sargent Collection; The Costume Collection; The Technology Collection
- Curator: Julian Porter
- Website: bexhillmuseum.org.uk

Bexhill Museum is in Bexhill-on-Sea, East Sussex. An independent museum founded in 1914. The museum is run as a registered charity supported by volunteers and two employees.

== History ==
Bexhill Museum was opened in 1914. The Reverend J.C. Thompson and Kate Marsden were instrumental in the setting up of the museum and Thompson was Hon Curator until 1924. Marsden was one of the first women to be made a fellow of the Royal Geographical Society after she travelled thousands of miles across Russia to Siberia in 1891. Marsden is credited as the person who inspired the museum's creation as she organised meetings to gather local support. She invited local dignitaries and successfully applied for artefacts from Bryant and May, Frys and Colmans. The museum was given a shell collection by Marsden and she encouraged Walter Amsden to donate a collection of Egyptian artefacts. In 1913 the Mayor of Bexhill contacted the committee and revealed that Marsden had been involved in a controversy concerning her finances and sexuality. Marsden was obliged to resign.

The museum is housed in what was known as the Egerton Park Shelter Hall, built in 1903 by George Ball. This had been a small entertainments pavilion for the use of visitors to the park. The Bexhill Corporation owned the building and leased it to the museum as well as proving a small grant.

Henry Sargent started work at Bexhill Museum in 1920 and remained in post until his death in 1983. The museum's governing body, the Bexhill Museum Association, was founded in 1923.

The museum built up a collection of local archaeology and taxidermy and founded the Bexhill Museum Association in 1923 to oversee their work. The natural history collection was not well preserved as the temperature and light levels were difficult to control and the basement was liable to flood.

In 1986 the museum's buildings were remodelled. The lighting and heating were brought under better control and temporary exhibition space and a store were established in the previous toilet blocks. Over the next ten years the relationship with Rother District Council led to a curator being transferred to the museum.

== Today ==
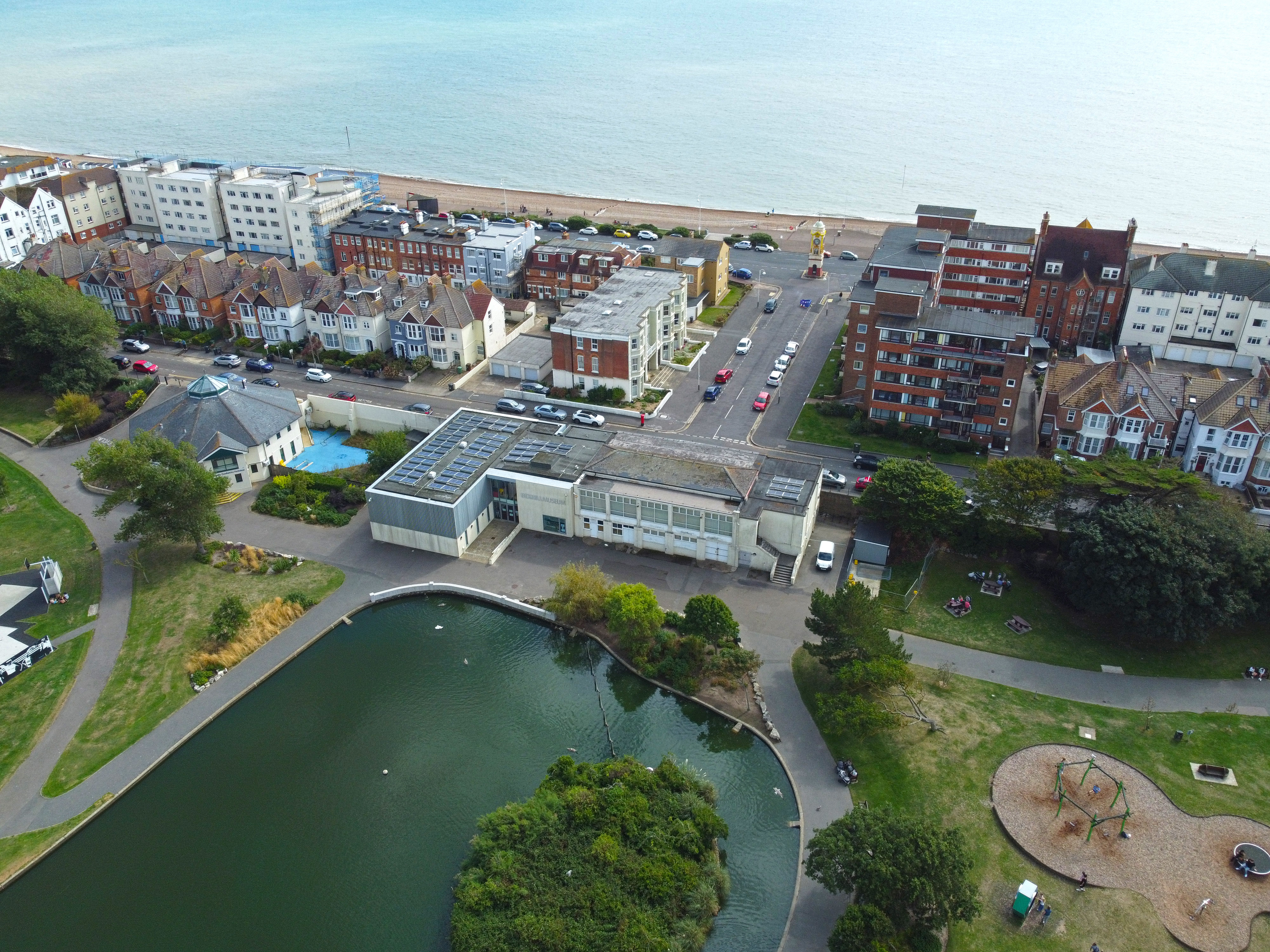
Aerial view of Bexhill Museum from Egerton Park

The museum merged with the Bexhill Museum of Costume in 2004 and became a registered charity overseen by trustees. It is run by volunteers, with two paid employees and a curator employed by Rother District Council. The patron of the museum is Eddie Izzard.

There are 4 collections on permanent display:

- The Sargent Collection - An Edwardian gallery showing sea shells, dinosaurs, birds, mammals, insects, artefacts from Ancient Egypt and Peru, stone tools and local archaeological treasures.
- The Costume Collection - Garments, accessories and social history dating from the 17th century to the modern day.
- The Technology Collection - Various vehicles representing different eras and technology.
- Bexhill in WWII Gallery - Where the bombs fell in Bexhill, original items from WWII and the Bexhill 1940 Winter Wartime Model Railway.

== Gallery ==
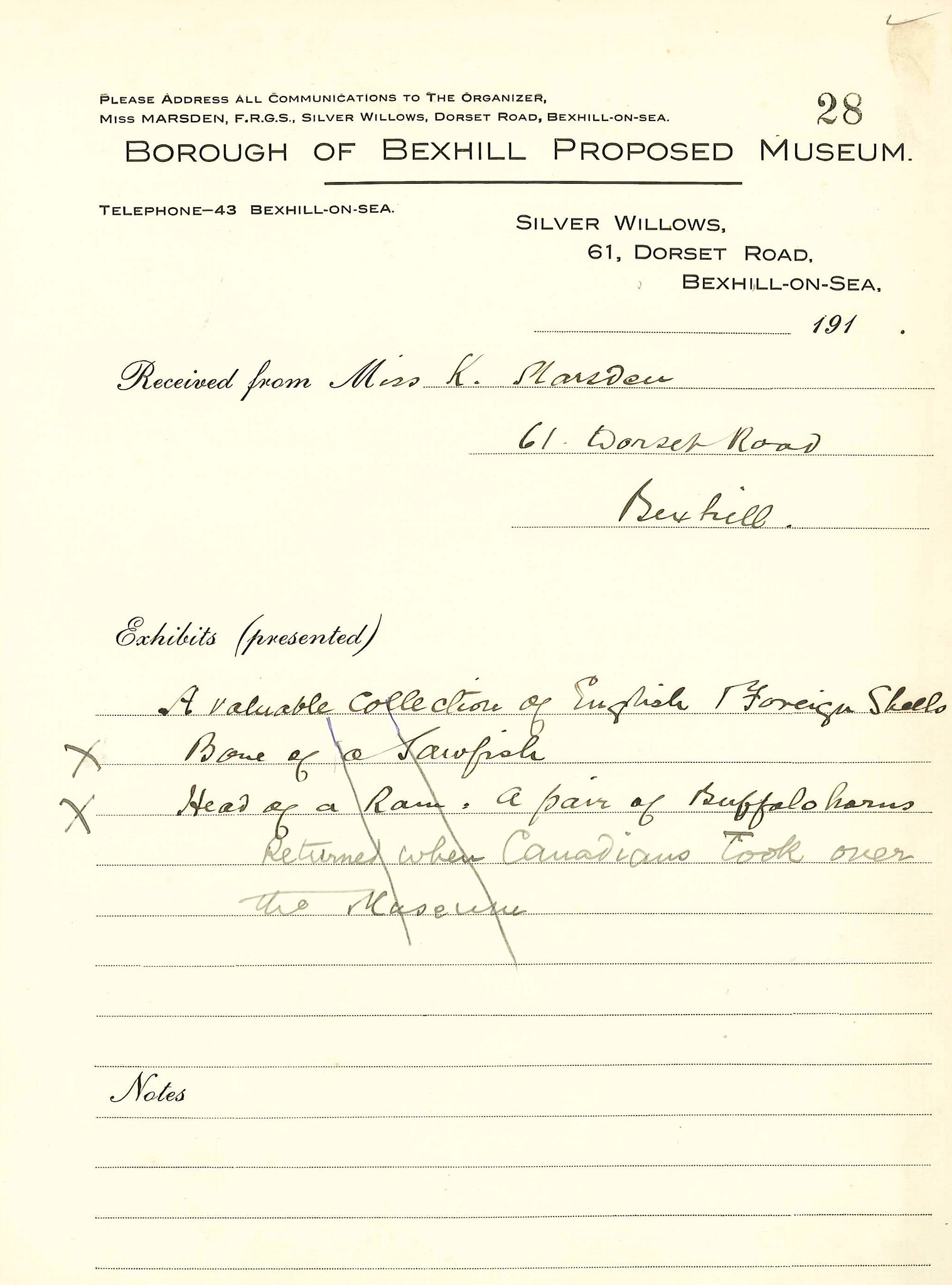
First Accession Register of Bexhill Museum by Kate Marsden

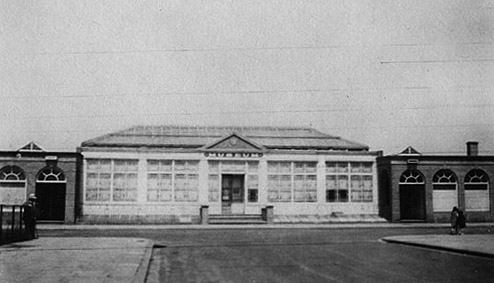
The museum when it opened, 1914

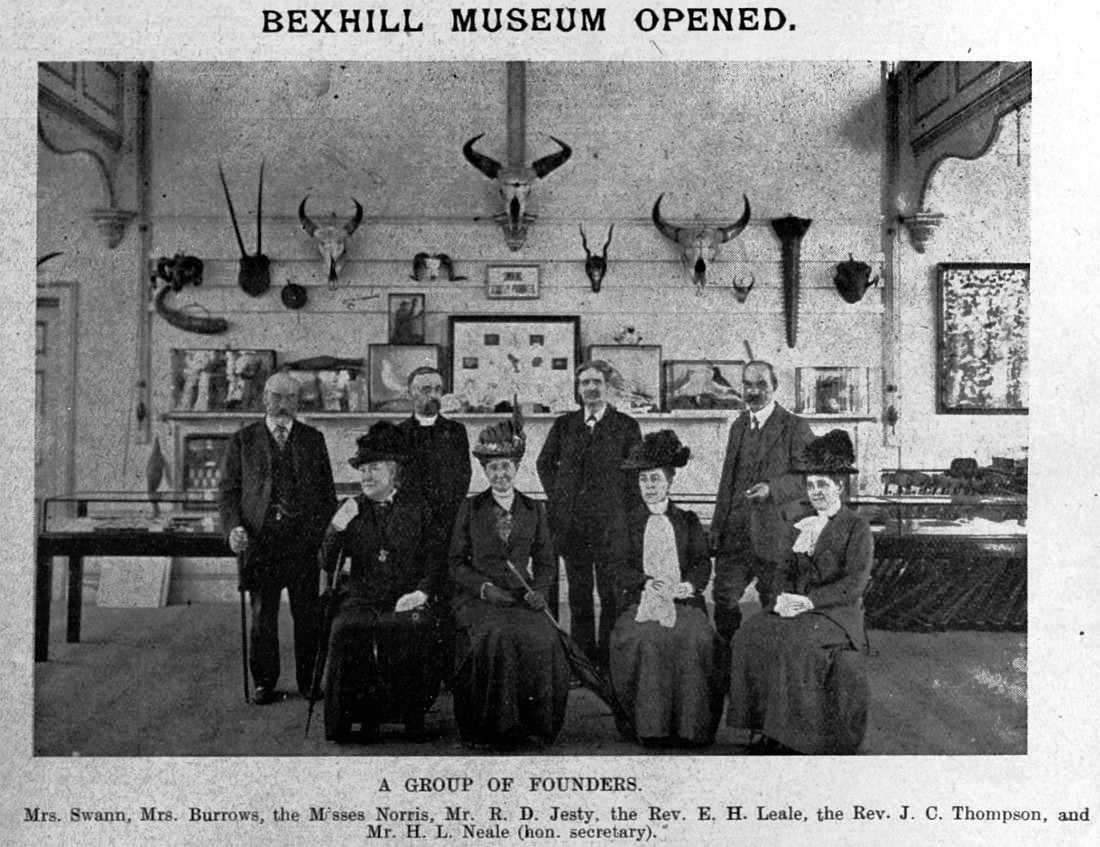
The founders of the museum, 1914

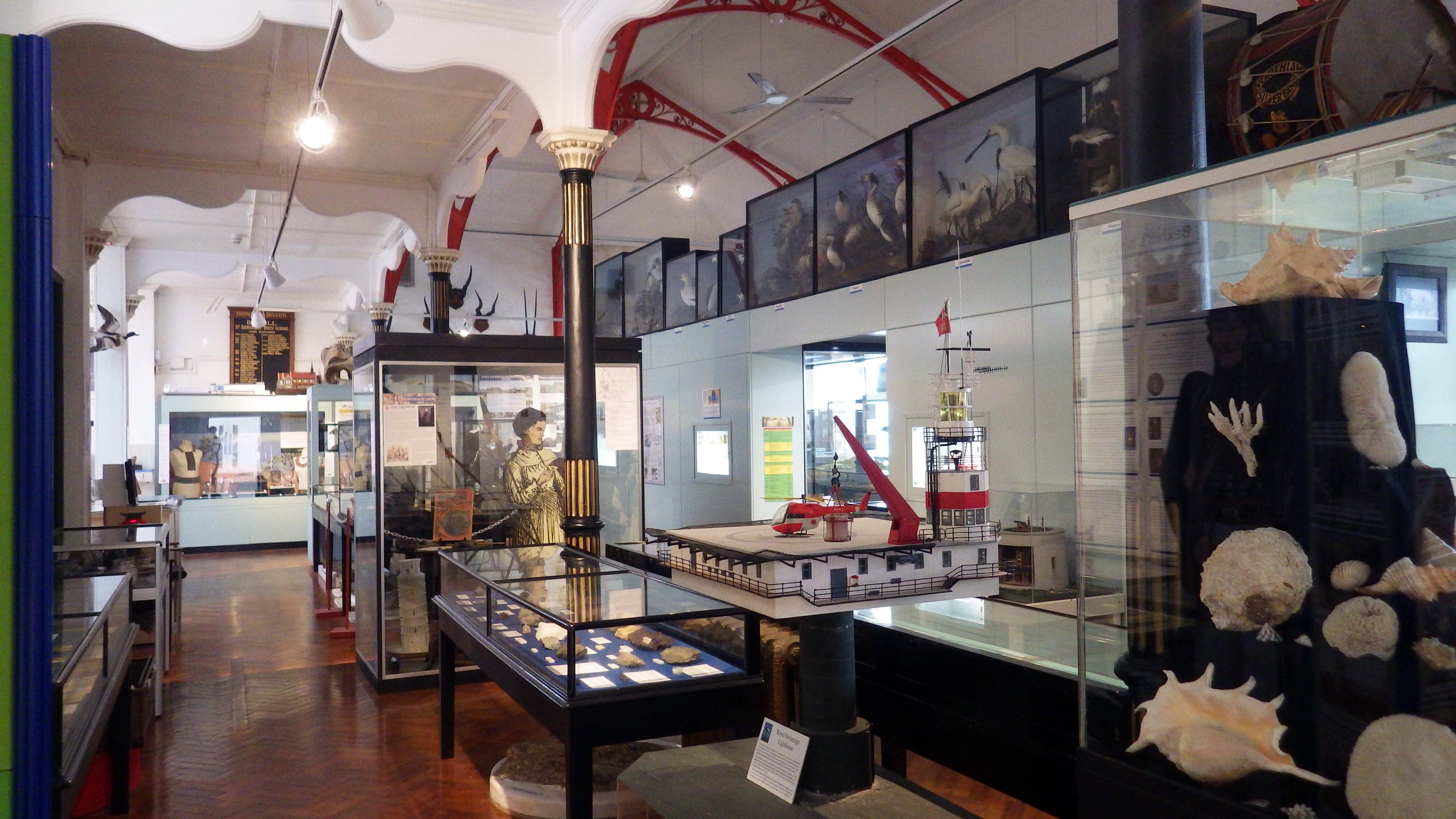
The Sargent Gallery

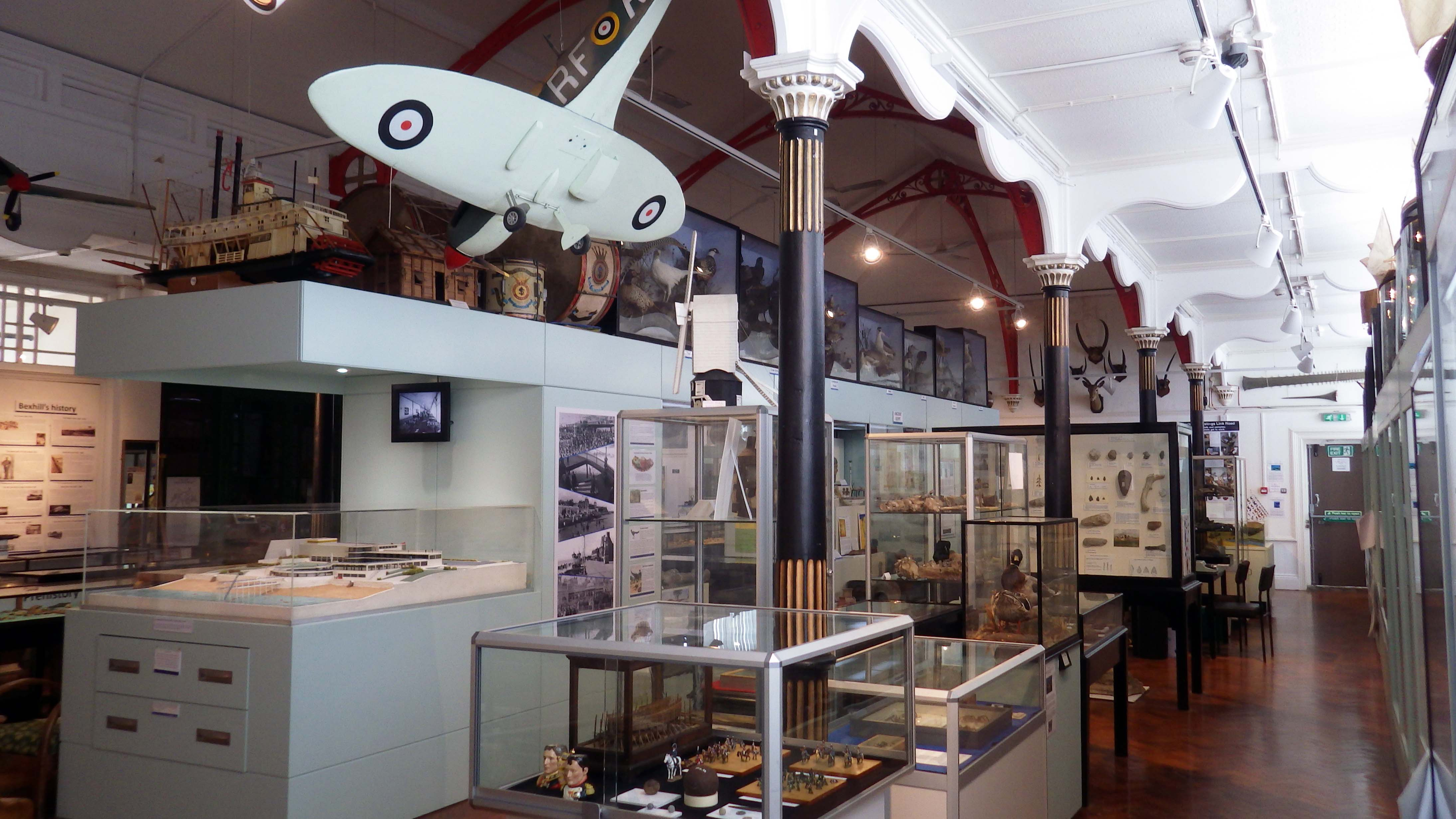
The museum maintains its Edwardian heritage

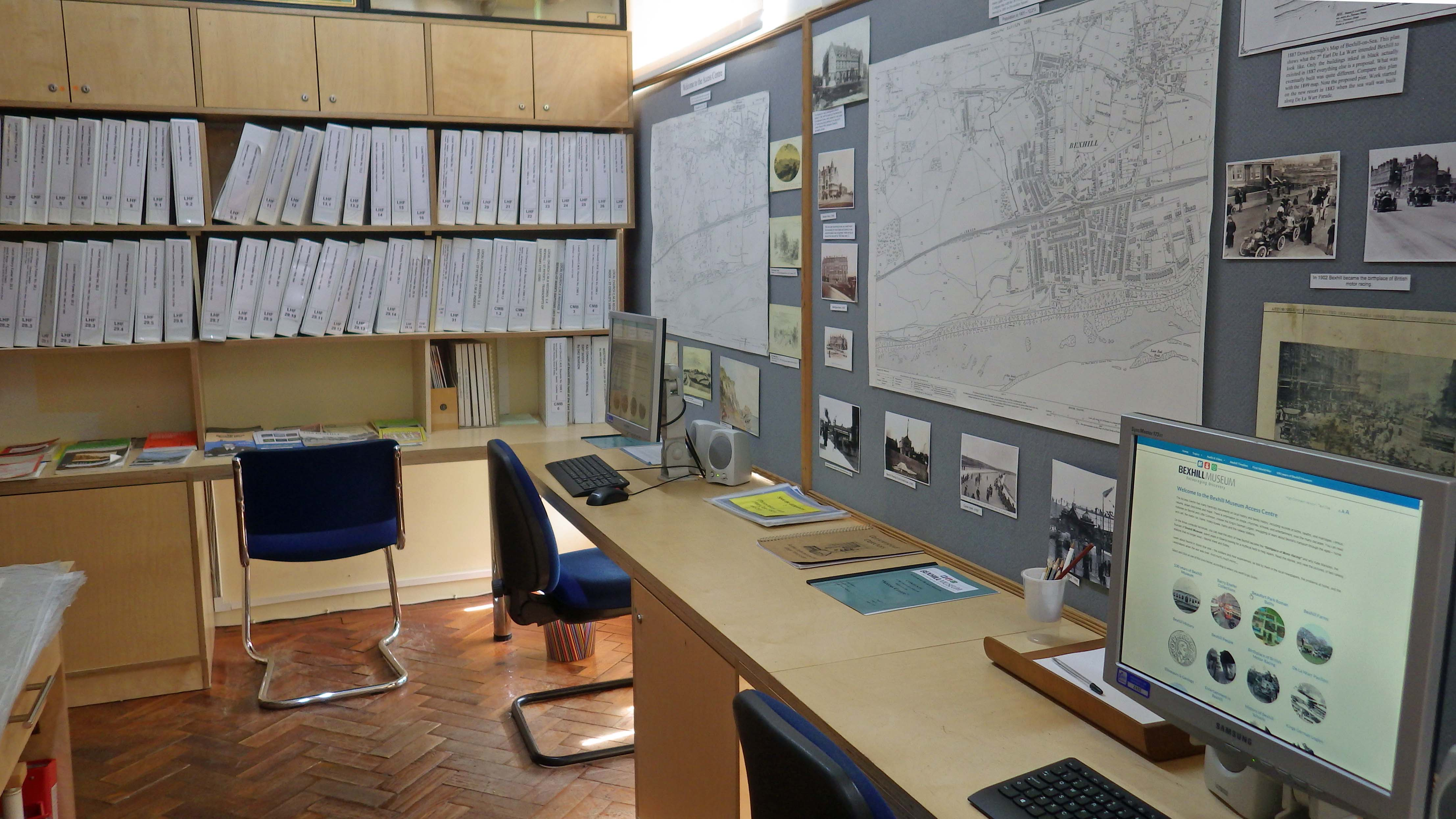
The Access Centre provides a place for local research
