= Tosu, Russia =

Tosu Тосу Халбаакы (Sakha)
- Selo
- Interactive map of Tosu
- Location of Tosu Tosu (Sakha Republic)
- Coordinates: 63°52′40″N 121°38′03″E
- Country: Russia
- Federal subject: Sakha Republic
- Administrative district: Vilyuysky District
- Rural okrugSelsoviet: Khalbakinsky Rural Okrug

Population (2010 Census)
  - Total: 665
  - Estimate (2021): 813 (+22.3%)

Administrative status
  - Capital of: Khalbakinsky Rural Okrug

Municipal status
  - Municipal district: Vilyuysky Municipal District
  - Rural settlement: Khalbakinsky Rural Settlement
  - Capital of: Khalbakinsky Rural Settlement
- Time zone: UTC+
- Postal code: 678213
- OKTMO ID: 98618462101

Tosu (Russian: Тосу; Yakut: Халбаакы, Xalbaakı) is a rural locality (a selo), the administrative centre of and one of two settlements, in addition to Starovatovo, in Khalbakinsky Rural Okrug of Vilyuysky District in the Sakha Republic, Russia. It is located 18 kilometers (11 mi) from Vilyuysk, the administrative center of the district. Its population as of the 2010 Census was 665, of whom 325 were male and 340 female, down from 731 as recorded during the 2002 Census.
