= Kate Marsden =

British missionary and nurse (1859–1931)

Kate Marsden, FRGS
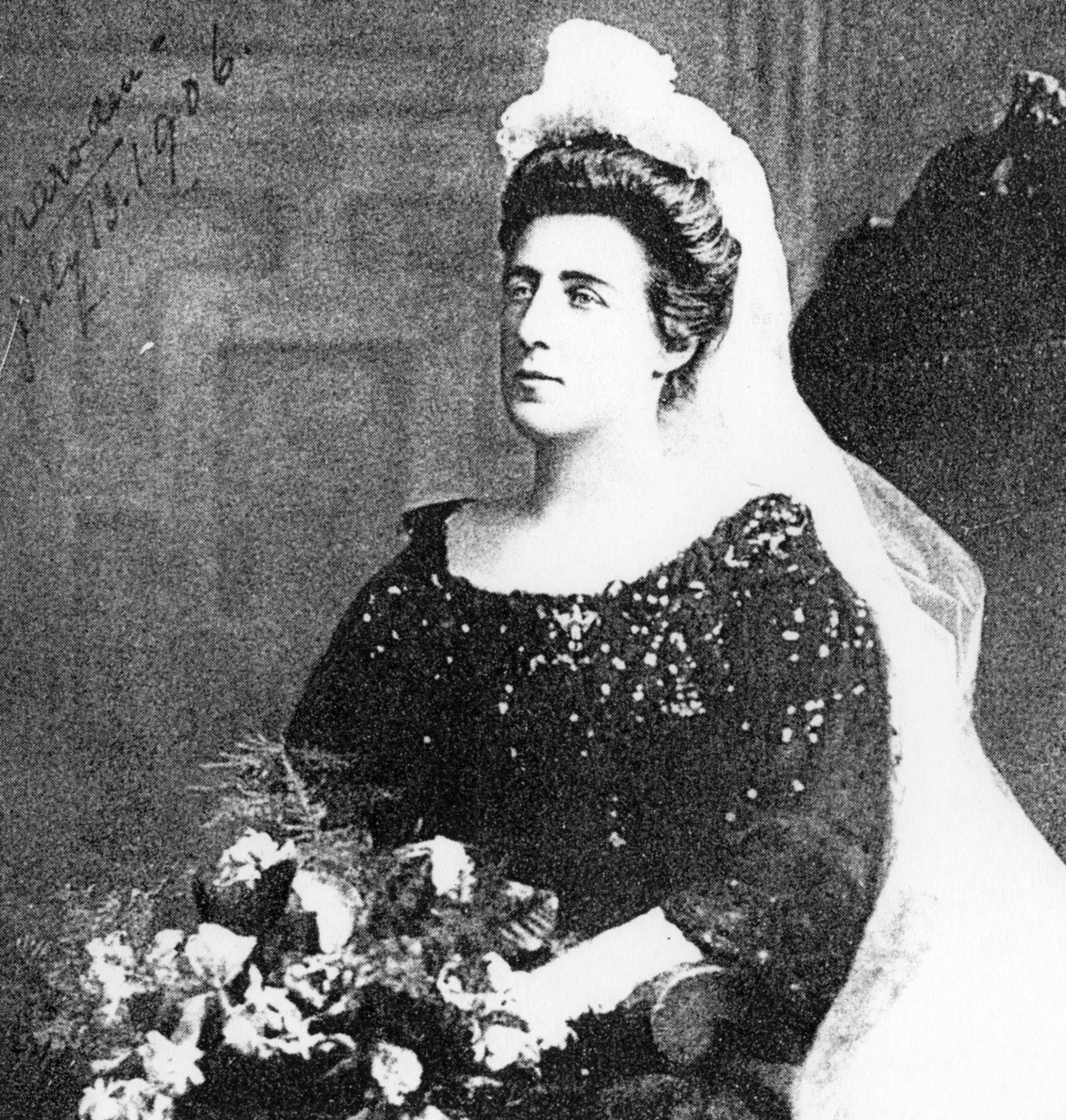
- Born: 13 May 1859; Edmonton, London, England
- Died: 26 May 1931 (aged 72); London, England
- Known for: Travelling to Siberia to find a leprosy cure

Kate Marsden, FRGS (13 May 1859 – 26 May 1931) was a British missionary, explorer, writer and nurse. Supported by Queen Victoria and Empress Maria Feodorovna, she investigated a cure for leprosy. She set out on a round trip from Moscow to Siberia to find a cure, creating a leper treatment centre in Siberia.

She returned to England and helped to found Bexhill Museum, but she was obliged to retire as a trustee. Marsden's finances came under scrutiny as did her motives for the journey. She was however elected a fellow of the Royal Geographical Society. She has a large diamond named after her and is still celebrated in Siberia, where a large memorial statue was erected at Sosnovka village in 2014.

== Early life ==
Marsden was born in Edmonton in London in 1859 to solicitor J. D. Marsden and Sophie Matilda Wellsted. Her uncle was the explorer Captain James Raymond Wellsted. She became a nurse when she was 16 and went to work in a London hospital. She later became a matron at Wellington Hospital, New Zealand, having gone there with her mother Sarah, to nurse her own sister who was ill with tuberculosis. Her sister died within days of their arrival. Marsden's record gained her this senior position but she held that position for just five months. She had an accident on a step ladder which made her unable to work for several months. She resigned to mixed reactions – the governor William Jervois and the management gave her six months' wages when she resigned, although other commentators noted that she had insured herself only days before the accident and she was considered difficult and autocratic by her staff.

Marsden had set up a St John's Ambulance group in New Zealand and she gave lectures there. In her final lecture she announced that she intended to visit Louis Pasteur in Europe, and then go on to work with Father Damien in Hawaii caring for lepers. She was given financial support to continue her work.

She travelled from Tottenham to Bulgaria with others to nurse Russian soldiers wounded in Russia's war with Turkey in 1877. Working at the Red Cross mission, her selflessness and devotion brought her an award from Empress Maria Fedorovna. Near Svishtov she reportedly met her first two lepers and they persuaded her that her mission was to work with sufferers of the disease.

== Interest in leprosy ==
The Wellington hospital had been set up primarily to look after the local Māori population. Marsden would later report that she looked after lepers in New Zealand – but although there was a similar disease there was no leprosy amongst the Māori people.

She continued to work as a nurse whilst also visiting the sick but wanting to leave for the British colonies to treat leprosy. After obtaining the support of Queen Victoria and Princess Alexandra, she travelled to Russia to obtain funding from the Russian Royal family. On this basis, she was able to travel to Egypt, Palestine, Cyprus and Turkey. According to her book On sledge and horseback to the outcast Siberian Lepers, she met an English doctor in Constantinople who told her of the curative properties of an herb found in Siberia. Inspired by this information she resolved to journey to Siberia.

== Journey to Siberia ==
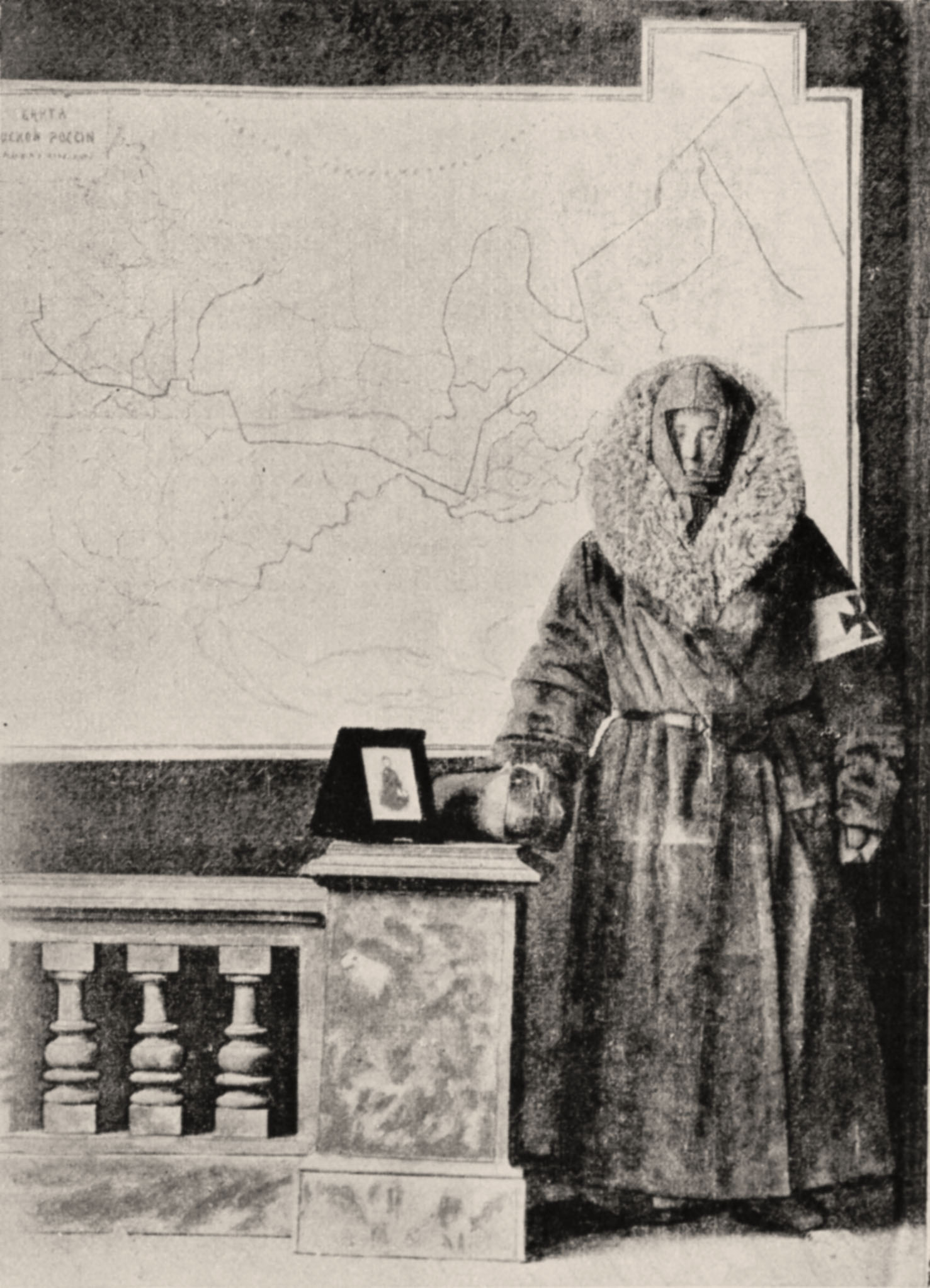
Marsden showing the Jaeger clothing she wore on her journey with a map of her journey behind her

She set sail from England to Moscow on board the merchant vessel Parramatta. She was able to arrange an audience with the Tsarina after she arrived in Moscow in November 1890. The Tsarina gave her a letter encouraging all who read it to assist Marsden with her plans to investigate leprosy in Siberia. Marsden took provisions including clothing so robust that it took three men to carry her into the sledge that carried her part of the way. She said that she could not bend her legs in the outfit. Marsden took 18 kg of Christmas pudding. This unusual addition was justified by Marsden because it was known to keep well and she liked it. She set out three months later with an assistant and translator Ada Field.

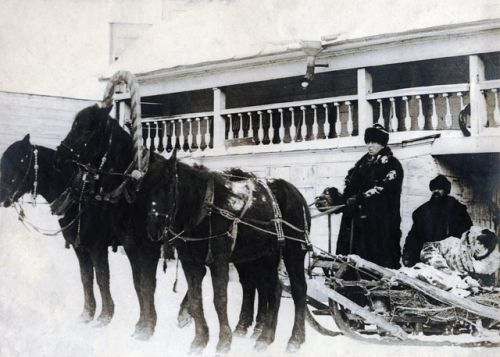
Kate Marsden travelling in Siberia

Her journey took her some 11,000 miles (18,000 km) across Russia, by train, sledge, on horseback and by boat. She had to interrupt her journey near Omsk after falling ill.

She helped at prisons she encountered on her journey, and gave out food to Russian prisoners as they travelled into exile, with double rations for the women who accompanied them or women who were convicts. Near her birthday in May she arrived at Irkutsk and formed a committee to address the problem of leprosy. She then travelled down the River Lena to Yakutsk where she obtained the herb that she believed might be a cure for leprosy. Although the herb did not bring the cure she had hoped for, she continued to work amongst the lepers in Siberia.

In 1892, she became a fellow of the Royal Geographical Society, and she was personally given an angel shaped brooch by Queen Victoria. In 1893, Marsden travelled to Chicago to attend the World's Fair. She had a booth in the Woman's Building, and she gave a lecture about her travels (called ''The Leper'') to the Congress of Women, held in the Woman's Building.

In 1895, Marsden founded a charity, still active today, now known as the St Francis Leprosy Guild. In 1897, she returned to Siberia where she opened a hospital for lepers in Vilyuysk. She never fully recovered from her journey but she gave her account of it in her book On Sledge and Horseback to Outcast Lepers in Siberia, published in 1893.

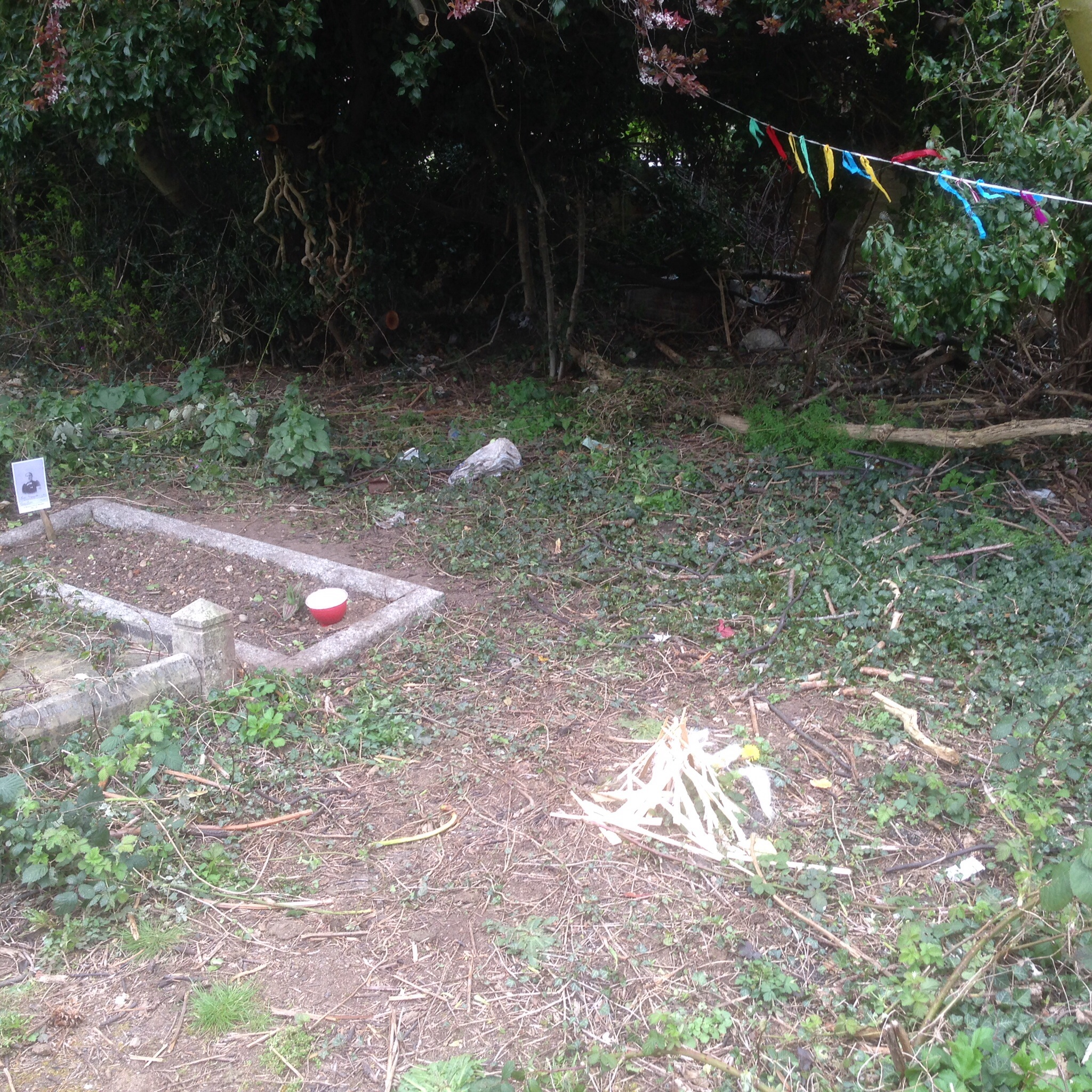
Marsden's grave has been rediscovered and cleared

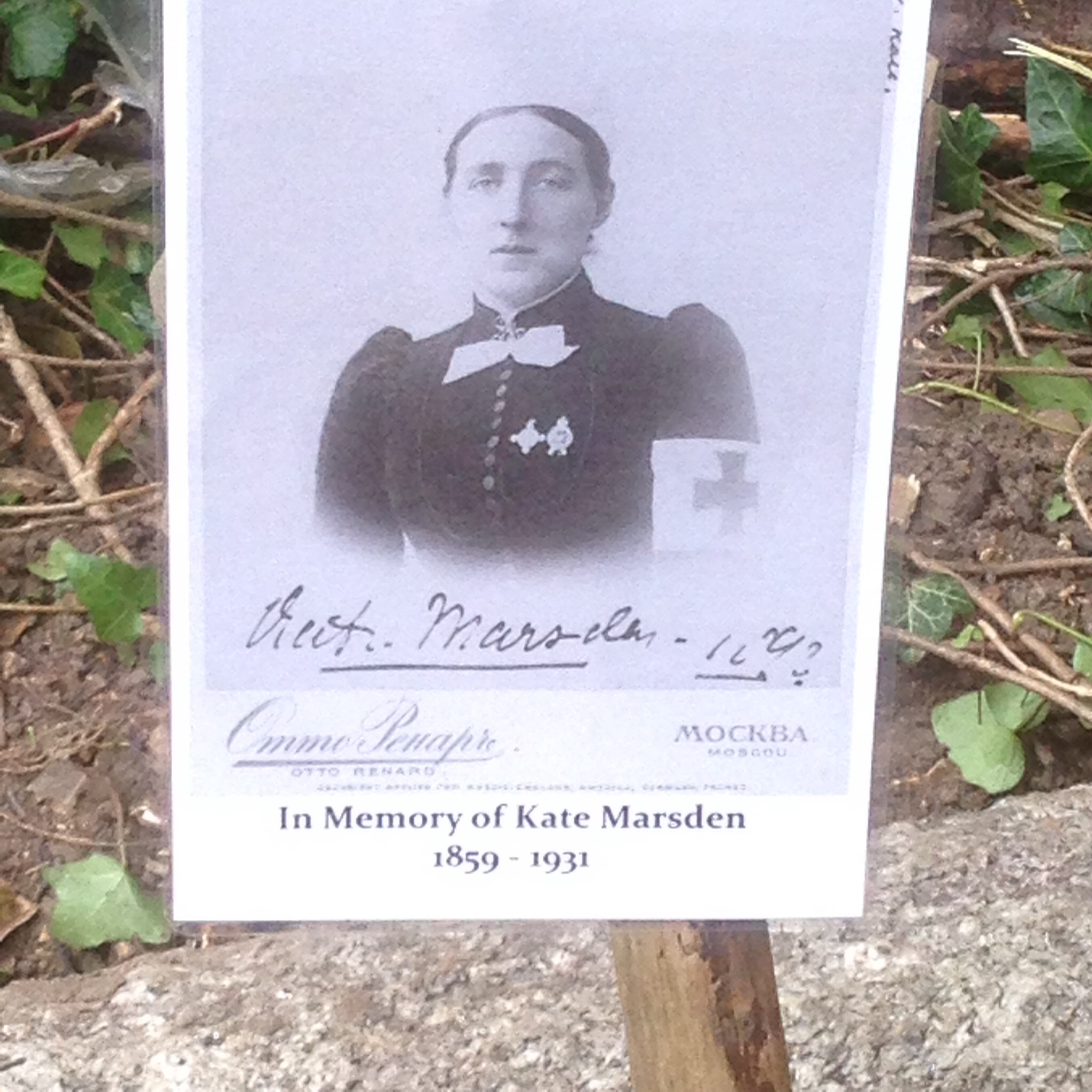
The ad hoc memorial

She died in London on 26 March 1931, and was buried in Hillingdon cemetery in Uxbridge on 31 March. Her grave was overgrown for many years and covered in bushes. These have now been cleared, and her grave and the ones nearby are now accessible.

The monument to Kate Marsden was consecrated on 3 September 2019.

== Controversy ==
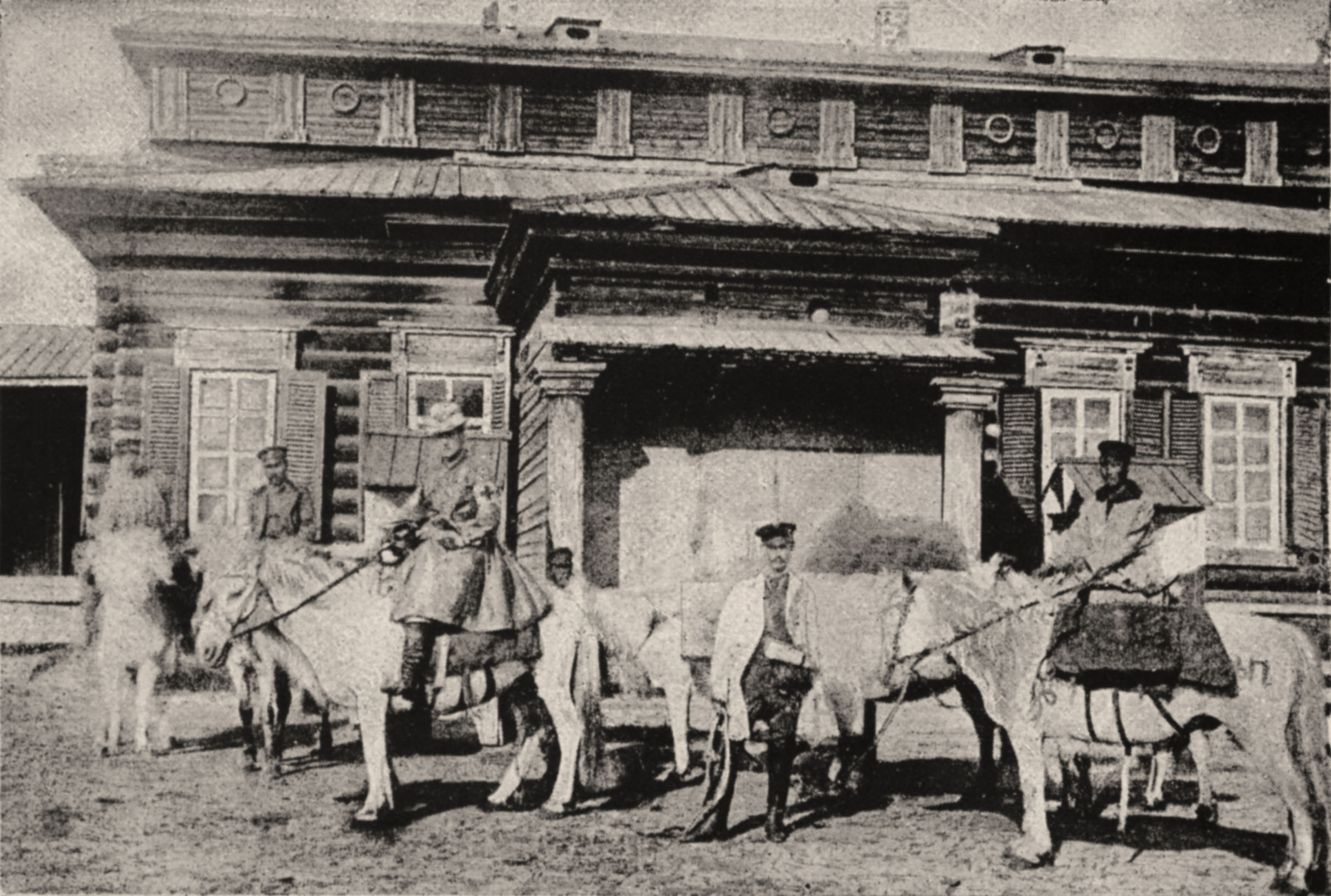
Marsden leaving Yakutsk in 1891

Marsden's 2,000-mile (3,200 km) journey to Siberia to find a cure for leprosy did not bring her universal acclaim; she did not find the cure she had hoped for, and many found it difficult to believe that she had undertaken the journey she claimed. Moreover, there were rumours that Marsden's good works were undertaken to atone for her homosexuality. Although the Girl's Own Paper serialised her exploits and she was lauded by the Royal Geographical Society, accounts by William Thomas Stead held her accomplishments up for public derision. Stead is now thought of as an early tabloid journalist. His ideas were picked up in New Zealand, where Marsden had earlier lived.

The Reverend Alexander Francis, an English-speaking pastor in St Petersburg, obtained a confession from Marsden of "immorality with women". Francis wrote that he also planned to publish material which would allege fraud by Marsden. This led to an investigation in Russia that cleared Marsden – dismissed by Francis as a "whitewash". A letter was also written by British and American diplomats to The Times to support her reputation in August 1894.

Marsden considered claiming libel damages against Francis. At this time, in early 1895 Oscar Wilde began his famous court battle with the Marquis of Queensbury, concerning Wilde's disputed homosexuality; Wilde lost and was ruined. Female homosexual activity was not illegal, but untrue accusations of it would certainly have seemed libellous. Marsden began a libel case, but did not proceed with her libel case because of insufficient funds.

Marsden seems to have anticipated some disbelief in her deeds and motives in her book. Moreover, she included in her book letters from important people she met on her journey which led some to think that her motives were questionable. Some described the journey as a "pleasure trip".

In 1893 Isabel Hapgood reviewed the book by Marsen describing her journey, and like others cast doubt on Marsden's efforts. It has been speculated that Hapgood may have been motivated by a feeling that Russia was her own particular area of expertise, or by homophobia.

== Continued controversy ==
Bexhill Museum was founded by Marsden and the Reverend J. C. Thompson FGS. Marsden is credited as the person who inspired the museum's creation. She organised meetings to gather local support. She wrote to the local paper and invited local dignitaries and she successfully gathered artefacts from the collections held by industrialists at matchmakers Bryant and May and chocolate makers Fry's.

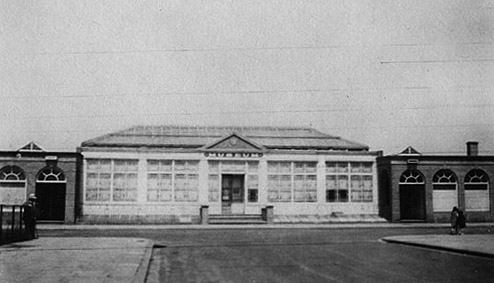
The museum in 1914

The museum was given Marsden's shell collection. She encouraged Dr Walter Amsden to donate his collection of Egyptian artefacts. In February 1913, the local council were being petitioned for funds crediting Marsden as the museum's chief supporter, and including the text of her talk to the council.

In 1913, the Mayor of Bexhill contacted the committee and revealed that Marsden had been involved in controversy over funds and her sexuality. The Charity Organisation Society advised that Marsden was "not a fit person to manage charitable funds". She was obliged to resign. The museum still opened in 1914 but without Marsden.

The controversy surrounding Marsden was not resolved and she finished her life suffering from dropsy and senile decay. After she died, Bexhill Museum refused a portrait that was offered to them.

== Works ==
- Kate Marsden: On Sledge and Horseback to Outcast Siberian Lepers. London, 1893
- Kate Marsden: The Leper. In: The Congress of Women: Held in the Woman's Building, World's Columbian Exposition, Chicago, U. S. A., 1893 (editor, Mary Kavanaugh Oldham Eagle). Monarch Book Company, Chicago 1894, S. 213–216
- Kate Marsden: My Mission in Siberia. A Vindication. London, 1921

== Legacy ==
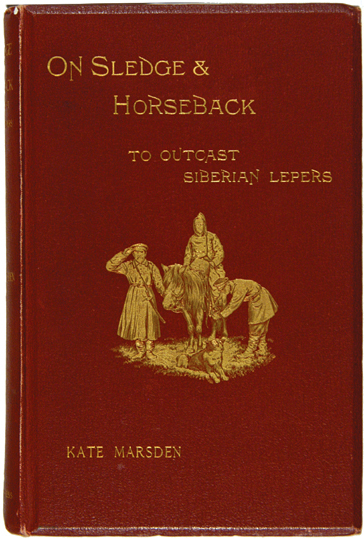

A Kate Marsden scholarship is given to the top English Language student at M.K. Ammosov North-Eastern Federal University in Yakutsk each year.

In 1991 a 55-carat diamond that was found in Yakutia was named the Sister of Mercy Kate Marsden.

In 2008, an investigation was undertaken to try to find the mystery herb that Marsden had travelled to Siberia to find. Some have supposed that the "cure" was wormwood that would have been useful in treating the patient's ulcers. The heir apparent was said to be a herb called kutchutka which was mentioned in an 1899 dictionary written in Sakha. Felicity Aston is credited with discovering that a translation of this dictionary is a source of this herb being a "cure for leprosy". One local herbalist said that he had used the herb several years before but it was so rare that he had not seen it recently. The researchers found the buildings that had made up the leprosarium which today are used as a village hall and as a residence in the settlement of Sosnovka which formed part of the leper hospital. The hospital closed in 1962.

In 2009, a foundation stone was laid to mark Marsden's 150th anniversary for a planned memorial and park in Yakutia. In the same year the Sakha Theatre premiered a new play titled Kate Marsden. An Angel of Divine Disposals.

The Royal Geographical Society has a small collection of items that belonged to Marsden including her watch, a whistle and the brooch that was given to her by Queen Victoria.

The British Museum also has a small collection of artefacts from Siberia that she donated in 1896.

== Literature ==
- Marsden, Kate (2012). On Sledge and Horseback to Outcast Siberian Lepers. Cambridge University Press. ISBN 978-1-108-04821-7.
- McLoone, Margo (1997). Women Explorers in Polar Regions: Louise Arner Boyd, Agnes Deans Cameron, Kate Marsden, Ida Pfeiffer, Helen Thayer. Capstone. pp. 23–. ISBN 978-1-56065-508-4.
- Middleton, Dorothy (1965). Victorian Lady Travellers. London: Routledge and Kegan Paul.
