= Kirovo, Sakha Republic =

Kirovo Кирово Кирово (Sakha)
- Selo
- Interactive map of Kirovo
- Location of Kirovo Kirovo (Sakha Republic)
- Coordinates: 64°32′44″N 122°14′33″E
- Country: Russia
- Federal subject: Sakha Republic
- Administrative district: Vilyuysky District
- Rural okrugSelsoviet: Khagynsky Rural Okrug

Population (2010 Census)
  - Total: 424
  - Estimate (2021): 389 (−8.3%)

Administrative status
  - Capital of: Khagynsky Rural Okrug

Municipal status
  - Municipal district: Vilyuysky Municipal District
  - Rural settlement: Khagynsky Rural Settlement
  - Capital of: Khagynsky Rural Settlement
- Time zone: UTC+
- Postal code: 678224
- OKTMO ID: 98618458101

Kirovo (Russian: Кирово; Yakut: Кирово) is a rural locality (a selo), the only inhabited locality, and the administrative center of Khagynsky Rural Okrug of Vilyuysky District in the Sakha Republic, Russia, located 145 kilometers (90 mi) from Vilyuysk, the administrative center of the district. Its population as of the 2010 Census was 424, up from 388 recorded during the 2002 Census.
