= Sydybyl =

Sydybyl Сыдыбыл Сыдыбыл (Sakha)
- Selo
- Interactive map of Sydybyl
- Location of Sydybyl Sydybyl (Sakha Republic)
- Coordinates: 63°36′N 121°29′E
- Country: Russia
- Federal subject: Sakha Republic
- Administrative district: Vilyuysky District
- Rural okrugSelsoviet: Chochunsky Rural Okrug

Population (2010 Census)
  - Total: 672
  - Estimate (2021): 742 (+10.4%)

Administrative status
  - Capital of: Chochunsky Rural Okrug

Municipal status
  - Municipal district: Vilyuysky Municipal District
  - Rural settlement: Chochunsky Rural Settlement
  - Capital of: Chochunsky Rural Settlement
- Time zone: UTC+
- Postal code: 678206
- OKTMO ID: 98618470101

Sydybyl (Russian: Сыдыбыл; Yakut: Сыдыбыл, Sıdıbıl) is a rural locality (a selo) and the administrative center of Chochunsky Rural Okrug of Vilyuysky District in the Sakha Republic, Russia, located 22 kilometers (14 mi) from Vilyuysk, the administrative center of the district. Its population as of the 2010 Census was 672, of whom 344 were male and 328 female, down from 685 as recorded during the 2002 Census.
