= Kirove =

Kirove is the former name of several settlements in Ukraine:

- Pivnichne, Donetsk Oblast
- Tavriiske, Zaporizhzhia Raion, Zaporizhzhia Oblast
- Tavriiske, Kherson Raion

== See also ==
- Kirovo (disambiguation)
