= Satagay, Vilyuysky District, Sakha Republic =

Satagay Сатагай Сатаҕай (Sakha)
- Selo
- Interactive map of Satagay
- Location of Satagay Satagay (Sakha Republic)
- Coordinates: 64°28′48″N 122°42′54″E
- Country: Russia
- Federal subject: Sakha Republic
- Administrative district: Vilyuysky District
- Rural okrugSelsoviet: Kyrgydaysky Rural Okrug

Population (2010 Census)
  - Total: 554
  - Estimate (2021): 518 (−6.5%)

Administrative status
  - Capital of: Kyrgydaysky Rural Okrug

Municipal status
  - Municipal district: Vilyuysky Municipal District
  - Rural settlement: Kyrgydaysky Rural Settlement
  - Capital of: Kyrgydaysky Rural Settlement
- Time zone: UTC+
- Postal code: 678212
- OKTMO ID: 98618426101

Satagay (Russian: Сатагай; Yakut: Сатаҕай, Satağay) is a rural locality (a selo), the only inhabited locality, and the administrative center of Kyrgydaysky Rural Okrug of Vilyuysky District in the Sakha Republic, Russia, located 145 kilometers (90 mi) from Vilyuysk, the administrative center of the district. Its population as of the 2010 Census was 554, of whom 279 were male and 275 female, down from 612 as recorded during the 2002 Census.
