= Sosnovka, Sakha Republic =

Sosnovka Сосновка Сосновка (Sakha)
- Selo
- Interactive map of Sosnovka
- Location of Sosnovka Sosnovka (Sakha Republic)
- Coordinates: 63°52′44″N 121°37′01″E
- Country: Russia
- Federal subject: Sakha Republic
- Administrative district: Vilyuysky District
- Urban okrugSelsoviet: Vilyuysk Urban Okrug

Population (2010 Census)
  - Total: 303
  - Estimate (2023): 318 (+5%)

Municipal status
  - Municipal district: Vilyuysky Municipal District
  - Rural settlement: Vilyuysk Urban Settlement
- Time zone: UTC+
- Postal code: 678200
- OKTMO ID: 98618101106

Sosnovka (Russian: Сосновка; Yakut: Сосновка) is a rural locality (a selo), and one of two settlements in Vilyuysk Urban Okrug of Vilyuysky District in the Sakha Republic, Russia, in addition to Vilyuysk, the administrative center of the Urban Okrug and the district. It is located 13 kilometers (8.1 mi) from Vilyuysk. Its population as of the 2010 Census was 303, of whom 166 were male and 137 female, up from 267 recorded during the 2002 Census was 267.

== History ==
This settlement's village hall is said to be the remains of a leper hospital inspired by the British explorer Kate Marsden who travelled the length of Russia to find a cure for leprosy she had been told about. Marsden never said what the herb was. The heir apparent is now said to be a herb called kutchutka which was mentioned in an 1899 Sakha dictionary. One local herbalist told researchers in 2008 that it was so rare that he had not seen it recently. The researchers found the buildings that had made up the leprosarium that had closed in 1962. The village hall carries a plaque recording the centenary of Marsden's visit.
