= Kirovo, Republic of Bashkortostan =

Kirovo Кирово
- Selo
- Location within Bashkortostan Location within Russia
- Coordinates: 54°14′N 54°53′E
- Country: Russia
- Region: Bashkortostan
- District: Davlekanovsky District
- Time zone: UTC+5:00

Kirovo (Russian: Кирово) is a rural locality (a selo) in Rassvetovsky Selsoviet, Davlekanovsky District, Bashkortostan, Russia. The population was 299 as of 2010. There are 5 streets.

== Geography ==
Kirovo is located 12 km west of Davlekanovo (the district's administrative centre) by road. Komsomolsky is the nearest rural locality.
