= Kirovo, Jewish Autonomous Oblast =

Kirovo Кирово
- Selo
- Location within Jewish Autonomous Oblast Location within Russia
- Coordinates: 47°51′N 132°03′E
- Country: Russia
- Region: Jewish Autonomous Oblast
- District: Leninsky District
- Time zone: UTC+10:00

Kirovo (Russian: Кирово) is a rural locality (a selo) in Leninsky District, Jewish Autonomous Oblast, Russia. Population: 227 (2010 census); 281 (2002 census); There are 9 streets in this selo.

== Geography ==
This rural locality is located 43 km from Leninskoye (the district's administrative centre), 123 km from Birobidzhan (capital of Jewish Autonomous Oblast) and 7,101 km from Moscow. Bashmak is the nearest rural locality.
