= Vilyuysky District =

Vilyuysky District Вилюйский улус (Russian)
- District

Other transcription(s)
  - Sakha: Бүлүү улууhа
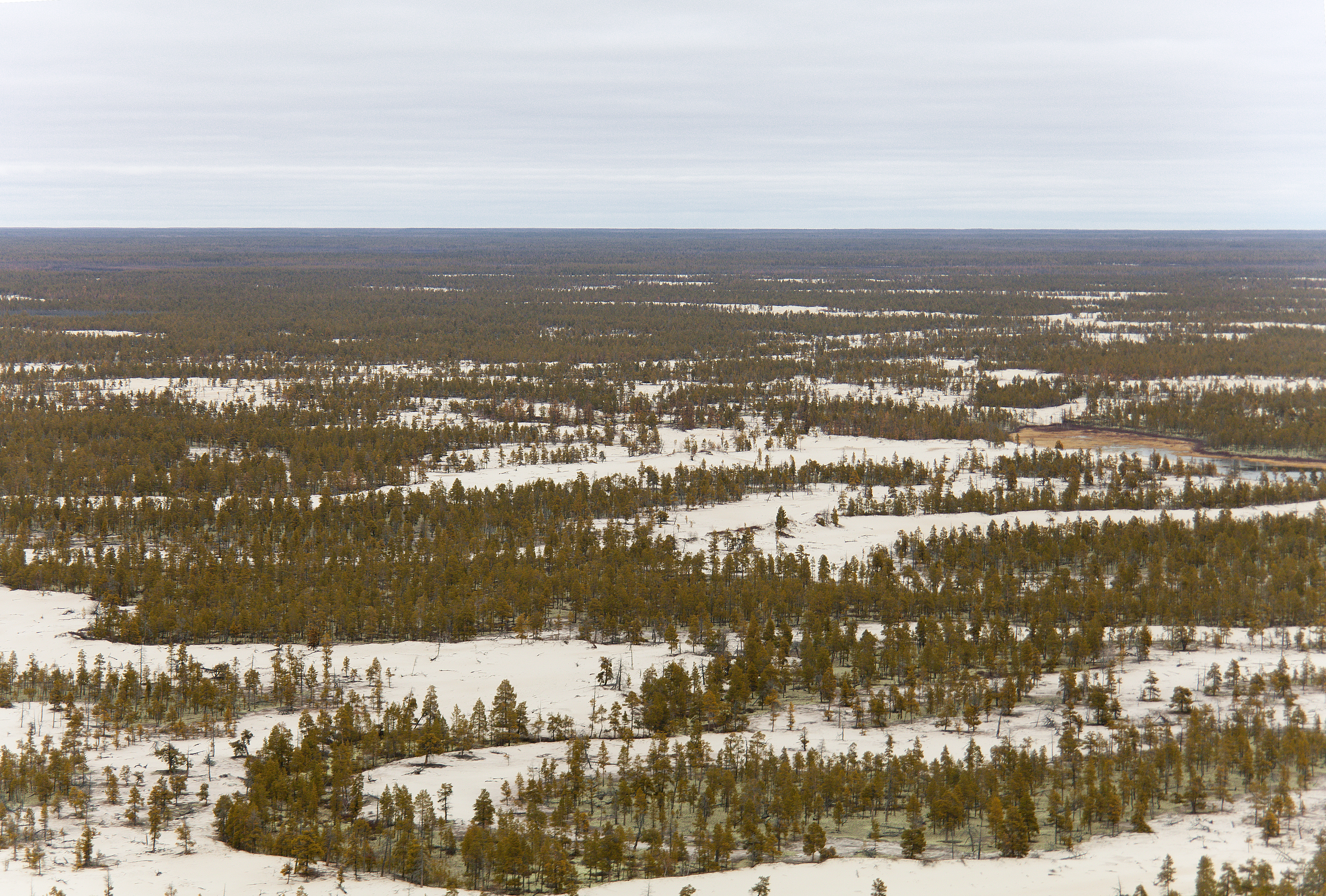
- Tukulan "sand dunes", Vilyuysky District

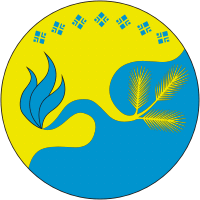
- Flag Coat of arms
- Location of Vilyuysky District in the Sakha Republic
- Coordinates: 63°45′N 121°37′E
- Country: Russia
- Federal subject: Sakha Republic
- Established: January 9, 1930
- Administrative center: Vilyuysk

Area
  - Total: 55,200 km^{2} (21,300 sq mi)

Population (2010 Census)
  - Total: 25,222
  - Density: 0.457/km^{2} (1.18/sq mi)
  - Urban: 52.9%
  - Rural: 47.1%

Administrative structure
  - Administrative divisions: 1 Towns under district jurisdiction, 1 Settlements, 19 Rural okrugs
  - Inhabited localities: 1 cities/towns, 1 urban-type settlements, 25 rural localities

Municipal structure
  - Municipally incorporated as: Vilyuysky Municipal District
  - Municipal divisions: 2 urban settlements, 19 rural settlements
- Time zone: UTC+
- OKTMO ID: 98618000
- Website: https://mr-viljujskij.sakha.gov.ru/

Vilyuysky District (Russian: Вилю́йский улу́с; Yakut: Бүлүү улууһа, romanized: Bülüü uluuha, [bylyː uluːha]) is an administrative and municipal district (raion, or ulus), one of the thirty-four in the Sakha Republic, Russia. It is located in the western central part of the republic and borders with Zhigansky District in the northeast, Kobyaysky District in the east, Gorny District in the south, Verkhnevilyuysky District in the west, and with Olenyoksky District in the northwest. The area of the district is 55,200 square kilometers (21,300 sq mi). Its administrative center is the town of Vilyuysk. Population: 25,222 (2010 census); 25,696 (2002 Census); 28,704 (1989 Soviet census). The population of Vilyuysk accounts for 40.6% of the district's total population.

== Geography ==
Main rivers in the district include the Vilyuy and its tributaries the Tyung and Chybyda, as well as the Tympylykan and Lungkha tributaries of the Lena.

== History ==
The district was established on January 9, 1930.

== Demographics ==
As of the 2021 Census, the ethnic composition was as follows:

- Yakuts: 87.4%
- Russians: 9.1%
- Evens: 2.1%
- other ethnicities: 1.4%

== Economy ==
The economy of the district is mostly based on agriculture.

== Inhabited localities ==
Municipal composition
Towns / Cities	Population	Male	Female	Inhabited localities in jurisdiction
Vilyuysk Urban Settlement (Вилюйск)	10,537	4,669 (45.6%)	5,565 (54.4%)	**Town of Vilyuysk** (administrative centre of the district); selo of Sosnovka
Urban settlements	Population	Male	Female	Inhabited localities in jurisdiction
Kysyl-Syr Urban Settlement (Кысыл-Сыр)	3,106	1,578 (50.8%)	1,528 (49.2%)	**Urban-type settlement of Kysyl-Syr**
Rural settlements	Population	Male	Female	Rural localities in jurisdiction*
Arylakhsky Nasleg (Арылахский наслег)	1,051	511 (48.6%)	540 (51.4%)	**selo of Khampa**
Bappagayinsky Nasleg (Баппагайинский наслег)	651	306 (47.0%)	345 (53.0%)	**selo of Ilbenge**; selo of Arylakh; selo of Sortol
Bekcheginsky Nasleg (Бекчегинский наслег)	477	245 (51.4%)	232 (48.6%)	**selo of Betyung**
Borogonsky Nasleg (Борогонский наслег)	479	239 (49.9%)	240 (50.1%)	**selo of Chay**
Yekyundinsky Nasleg (Екюндинский наслег)	321	146 (45.5%)	175 (54.5%)	**selo of Yekyundyu**
Zhemkonsky Nasleg (Жемконский наслег)	483	250 (51.8%)	233 (48.2%)	**selo of Ebya**
Kyrgydaysky Nasleg (Кыргыдайский наслег)	554	279 (50.4%)	275 (49.6%)	**selo of Satagay**
Kyuletsky 1-y Nasleg (Кюлетский 1-й наслег)	801	396 (49.4%)	405 (50.6%)	**selo of Usun**
Kyuletsky 2-y Nasleg (Кюлетский 2-й наслег)	412	209 (50.7%)	203 (49.3%)	**selo of Kyulekyan**
Lyokyochyonsky Nasleg (Лёкёчёнский наслег)	428	211 (49.3%)	217 (50.7%)	**selo of Lyokyochyon**
Tasagarsky Nasleg (Тасагарский наслег)	544	277 (50.9%)	267 (49.1%)	**selo of Tasagar**
Togussky Nasleg (Тогусский наслег)	601	288 (47.9%)	313 (52.1%)	**selo of Balagachchy**; selo of Seyat
Pervyy Togussky Nasleg (Первый Тогусский наслег)	534	268 (50.2%)	266 (49.8%)	**selo of Tympy**
Tylgyninsky Nasleg (Тылгынинский наслег)	644	300 (46.6%)	344 (53.4%)	**selo of Terbyas**
Khagynsky Nasleg (Хагынский наслег)	424	206 (48.6%)	218 (51.4%)	**selo of Kirovo**
Khalbakinsky Nasleg (Халбакинский наслег)	743	362 (48.7%)	381 (51.3%)	**selo of Tosu**; selo of Starovatovo
Chernyshevsky Nasleg (Чернышевский наслег)	945	471 (49.8%)	474 (50.2%)	**selo of Chineke**
Chochunsky Nasleg (Чочунский наслег)	868	444 (51.2%)	424 (48.8%)	**selo of Sydybyl**; selo of Kyunde
Yugyulyatsky Nasleg (Югюлятский наслег)	619	324 (52.3%)	295 (47.7%)	**selo of Kyubyainde**

Divisional source:
Population source:
*Administrative centers are shown in bold
