= Vilyuysk =

Vilyuysk Вилюйск
- Town under district jurisdiction

Other transcription(s)
  - Yakut: Бүлүү
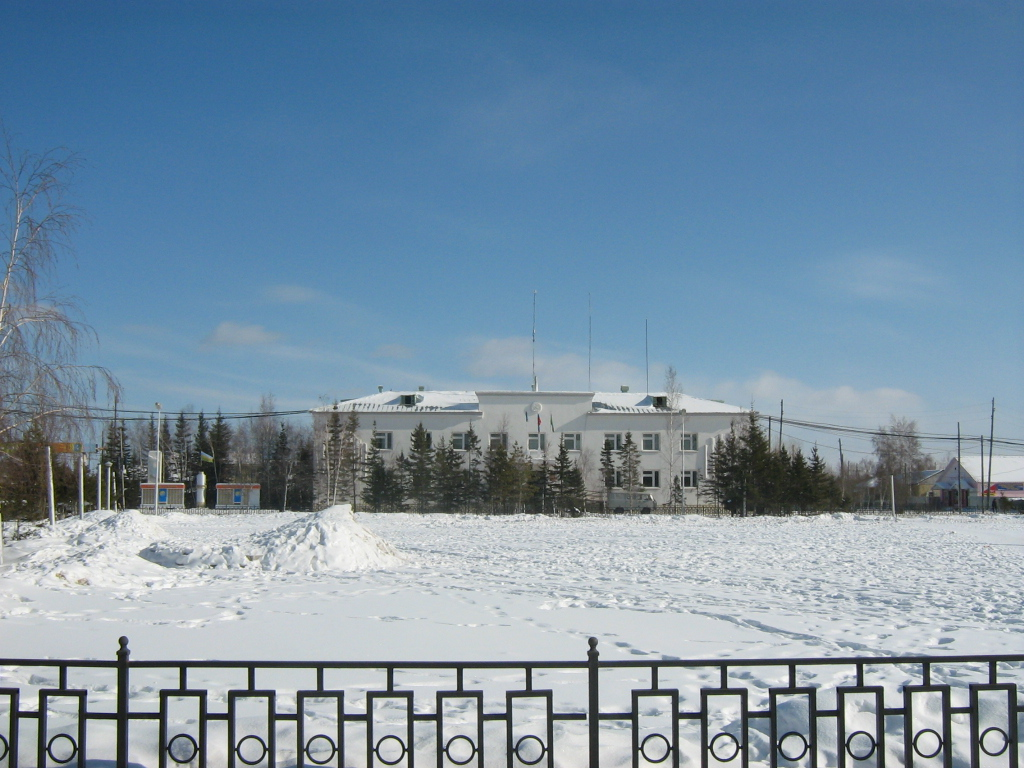

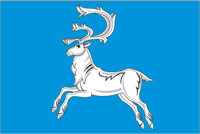
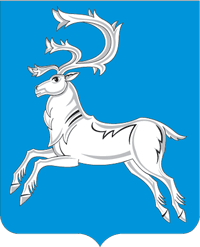
- Flag Coat of arms
- Interactive map of Vilyuysk
- Location of Vilyuysk Vilyuysk (Sakha Republic)
- Coordinates: 63°45′N 121°38′E
- Country: Russia
- Federal subject: Sakha Republic
- Administrative district: Vilyuysky District
- TownSelsoviet: Vilyuysk
- Founded: 1634
- Town status since: 1783
- Elevation: 105 m (344 ft)

Population
  - Estimate (2023): 10,045 )

Administrative status
  - Capital of: Vilyuysky District, Town of Vilyuysk

Municipal status
  - Municipal district: Vilyuysky Municipal District
  - Urban settlement: Vilyuysk Urban Settlement
  - Capital of: Vilyuysky Municipal District, Vilyuysk Urban Settlement
- Time zone: UTC+
- Postal codes: 678200, 678202, 678219, 678229
- Dialing code: +7 41132
- OKTMO ID: 98618101001
- Website: www.vilyuisk.ru

Vilyuysk (Russian: Вилюйск, IPA: [vʲɪˈlʲʉjsk]; Yakut: Бүлүү, Bülüü) is a town and the administrative center of Vilyuysky District in the Sakha Republic, Russia, located on the Vilyuy River (left tributary of the Lena), about 600 kilometers (370 mi) from Yakutsk, the capital of the republic. As of the 2010 Census, its population was 10,234.

Historical population
Year	Pop.	±%
1897	611	—
1926	1,300	+112.8%
1939	3,147	+142.1%
1959	4,817	+53.1%
1970	6,215	+29.0%
1979	7,108	+14.4%
1989	8,988	+26.4%
2002	9,776	+8.8%
2010	10,234	+4.7%
2021	10,032	−2.0%
Source: Census data

== History ==
The first permanent settlement on the site of the present town was a Cossack winter settlement founded in 1634 as Tyukanskoye or Verkhnevilyuyskoye.

Members of the peasant rebellion led by Yemelyan Pugachev were exiled to the area in the 1770s, building the new town of Olensk in 1783. The town's name was derived from the Russian word "олень" (olen), meaning "stag", as still seen in the town's symbols. The town was renamed Vilyuysk after the river on which it stands in 1821.

Kate Marsden visited in 1891 on her mission to treat lepers in the region, and returned in 1897 to establish a hospital. In 2014 a statue was constructed to her memory in the town.

== Administrative and municipal status ==
Within the framework of administrative divisions, Vilyuysk serves as the administrative center of Vilyuysky District. As an inhabited locality, Vilyuysk is classified as a town under district jurisdiction. As an administrative division, it is, together with one rural locality (the selo of Sosnovka), incorporated within Vilyuysky District as the Town of Vilyuysk. As a municipal division, the Town of Vilyuysk is incorporated within Vilyuysky Municipal District as Vilyuysk Urban Settlement.

== Transportation ==
The Vilyuysk Airport is located near the town.

== Climate ==
Vilyuysk has an extremely continental subarctic climate (Köppen climate classification Dfc). Winters are extremely cold, with January average temperatures about -34.4 °C (-29.9 °F), while summers are short but very warm, with average temperatures about 19.2 °С (66.6 °F) in July. Summer temperatures are actually quite high for its altitude due to its long distance from the moderating influence of the oceans. Precipitation is quite low, but is significantly higher in summer than at other times of the year.

Climate data for Vilyuysk
Month	Jan	Feb	Mar	Apr	May	Jun	Jul	Aug	Sep	Oct	Nov	Dec	Year
Record high °C (°F)	−0.4 (31.3)	−2.0 (28.4)	10.1 (50.2)	18.6 (65.5)	30.4 (86.7)	36.5 (97.7)	37.8 (100.0)	36.0 (96.8)	27.7 (81.9)	18.0 (64.4)	3.7 (38.7)	−2.1 (28.2)	37.8 (100.0)
Mean daily maximum °C (°F)	−30.7 (−23.3)	−25.1 (−13.2)	−11.0 (12.2)	2.0 (35.6)	12.0 (53.6)	22.6 (72.7)	25.4 (77.7)	20.8 (69.4)	10.8 (51.4)	−3.2 (26.2)	−21.1 (−6.0)	−31.1 (−24.0)	−2.4 (27.7)
Daily mean °C (°F)	−34.4 (−29.9)	−30.1 (−22.2)	−18.1 (−0.6)	−4.4 (24.1)	6.4 (43.5)	16.3 (61.3)	19.2 (66.6)	14.8 (58.6)	5.8 (42.4)	−6.8 (19.8)	−24.9 (−12.8)	−34.5 (−30.1)	−7.6 (18.4)
Mean daily minimum °C (°F)	−38.0 (−36.4)	−34.6 (−30.3)	−25.0 (−13.0)	−11.2 (11.8)	0.5 (32.9)	9.9 (49.8)	13.2 (55.8)	9.1 (48.4)	1.4 (34.5)	−10.3 (13.5)	−28.5 (−19.3)	−37.8 (−36.0)	−12.6 (9.3)
Record low °C (°F)	−60.9 (−77.6)	−58.0 (−72.4)	−50.0 (−58.0)	−40.2 (−40.4)	−23.0 (−9.4)	−5.3 (22.5)	0.0 (32.0)	−6.3 (20.7)	−15.4 (4.3)	−39.8 (−39.6)	−52.7 (−62.9)	−57.9 (−72.2)	−60.9 (−77.6)
Average precipitation mm (inches)	13 (0.5)	11 (0.4)	10 (0.4)	11 (0.4)	26 (1.0)	35 (1.4)	52 (2.0)	43 (1.7)	33 (1.3)	25 (1.0)	19 (0.7)	14 (0.6)	292 (11.4)
Average rainy days	0	0	0	4	11	14	13	13	15	5	0	0	75
Average snowy days	21	18	15	11	7	0	0	0	6	24	21	20	143
Average relative humidity (%)	74	75	68	58	54	55	60	66	71	77	77	75	68
Mean monthly sunshine hours	16	95	204	267	290	317	342	252	153	83	44	5	2,068
Source 1: pogoda.ru.net
Source 2: NOAA (sun only, 1961-1990)

== Naming honors ==
The minor planet 2890 Vilyujsk, discovered in 1978 by Soviet astronomer Lyudmila Zhuravlyova, is named after the town.
