= Tundra Enets language =

Samoyedic language

Tundra Enets
- сомату нау
- Native to: Russia
- Region: Taymyrsky Dolgano-Nenetsky District, Krasnoyarsk Krai
- Ethnicity: Tundra Enets
- Native speakers: 15 (2021)
- Language family: Uralic: Samoyedic; (core); Enets–Nenets; Enets; Tundra Enets

Language codes
- ISO 639-3: enh
- Glottolog: tund1254
- ELP: Tundra Enets
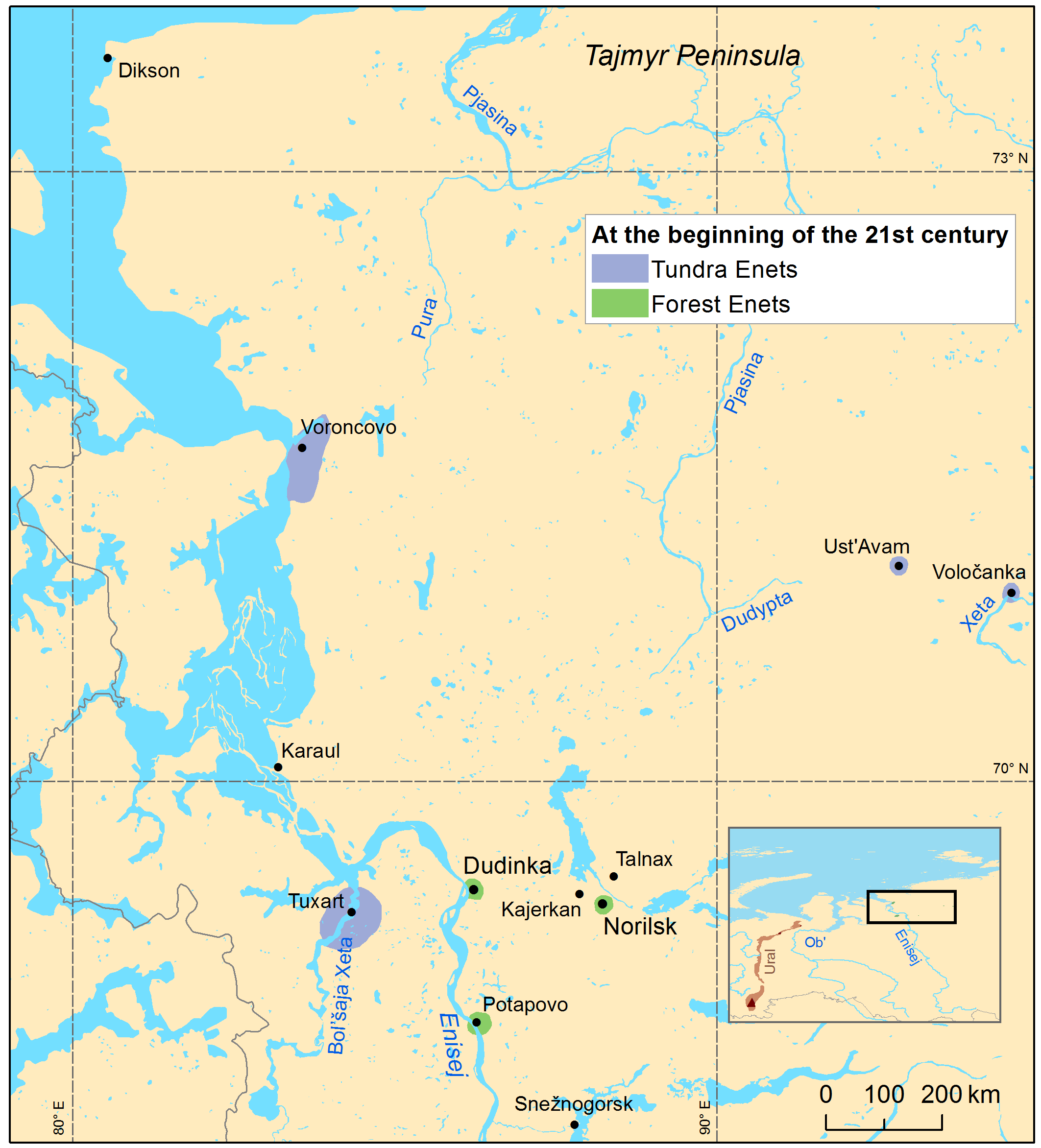
- Current distribution of Enets languages, including Tundra Enets.

- Tundra Enets is classified as Critically Endangered by the UNESCO Atlas of the World's Languages in Danger.

The Tundra Enets language is the language of the Tundra Enets, one of the Enets languages. It is spoken in the villages of Vorontsovo, Karepovsk, Tukhard and Karaul in the Taymyrsky Dolgano-Nenetsky District of Krasnoyarsk Krai. The language is classified as Critically Endangered, with communication of the language not occurring.

== Linguistic characteristics ==
The language has 6 vowel sounds: [i], [e], [a], [ɔ], [o], [u]. There are 21 consonant phonemes in the language: [b], [p], [d], [t], [dʲ], [tʃ], [k], [g], [Ɂ], [m], [n], [nʲ], [ŋ], [r], [z], [s], [ʃ], [x], [j], [l], [lʲ].

The Tundra Enets language is an agglutinative language. Nouns are characterized by the categories of nuclear and locative cases, denotation and number.

The sources of borrowed vocabulary are the Nenets, Nganasan and Russian languages; borrowings can be either adapted or unadapted.

== Functioning of language ==
The language is used very sparingly in family and everyday communication, having been supplanted by Tundra Nenets and Russian. Transmission to children ceased in the 1970s. Unlike Forest Enets, Tundra Enets is not used in education.

The number of native speakers of the language decreased significantly due to migration in the 1930s from the lower reaches of the Yenisei River to the east, which led to assimilation by the Nganasans. Also in the 1970s, assimilation by the Nenets occurred due to the transfer of Vorontsov reindeer herders to the Tukhard tundra.
