= Proto-Samoyedic language =

Ancestor of the Samoyedic languages

Proto-Samoyed
- Proto-Samoyedic
- Reconstruction of: Samoyedic languages
- Reconstructed ancestor: Proto-Uralic

Proto-Samoyedic, or Proto-Samoyed, is the reconstructed ancestral language of the Samoyedic languages: Nenets (Tundra and Forest), Enets, Nganasan, Selkup, as well as extinct Kamas and Mator. Samoyedic is one of the principal branches of the Uralic language family, and its ancestor is Proto-Uralic. It has been suggested that Proto-Samoyedic greatly influenced the development of Tocharian, an Indo-European language.

== Phonology ==
A fairly complex system of vowel phonemes is reconstructed for Proto-Samoyedic:

	Front		Back	
	Unrounded	Rounded	Unrounded	Rounded
Close	i [i]	ü [y]	i̮ [ɯ]	u [u]
Mid	e [e]	ö [ø]	e̮ [ɤ]	o [o]
Open	ä [æ]		a [ɑ]	å [ɒ]
Reduced	ə [ə̟]		ǝ̑ [ə̠]	

The system is retained relatively faithfully in Selkup (though expanded with vowel length). Two of the vowel contrasts are however only retained in Nganasan: the distinction of front and back reduced vowels, and that of *i versus *e. For the remainder of the family, following the mergers *e > *i and *ǝ̑ > *ə, a further shared change is raising of *ä > *e. Earlier works often thus give a slightly different transcription of several vowels:

Older reconstruction	Current reconstruction
*i	*i, *e
*e	*ä
*ä	*a

Even though the number of vowel phonemes was high, there were no long vowels or phonemic diphthongs. A peculiar feature of the reconstructed vowel system is the occurrence of vowel sequences, which consisted of any full vowel followed by a reduced vowel: for example, *tuǝ̑ 'feather', *kåǝ̑så 'man'. These sequences were not diphthongs; the vowels belonged to separate syllables. Evidence of the vowel sequences has been preserved in only part of the Samoyedic languages, primarily in Nganasan and Enets. Wagner-Nagy (2004) lists the following examples:

- Close + reduced: *iə, *iǝ̑, *üə, *üǝ̑, *uə, *uǝ̑
- Mid + reduced: *öǝ̑, *e̮ǝ̑, *oǝ̑, *oə
- Open + reduced: *äǝ̑ (> *eǝ̑), *åǝ̑
- Close + open: *uå
- Reduced + open: *ǝ̑å

Proto-Samoyedic had vowel harmony like many other Uralic languages. Harmony determined whether a front vocalic or a back vocalic allomorph of a suffix was used. However, the restrictions imposed by vowel harmony were not absolute because also disharmonic word-stems can be reconstructed. Such stems break vowel harmony by combining front and back vowels: e.g. Proto-Samoyedic *kålä 'fish', *wäsa 'iron'.

In contrast to the vowel system, the consonant system is rather simple with only 13 phonemes:

	labial	dental	palatal	velar
stop	p	t		k
affricate		c [ts]		
sibilant		s		
nasal	m	n	ń [ɲ]	ŋ
lateral		l		
trill		r		
semivowel	w		j	

The exact sound value of the affricate is not entirely clear; it may originally have been retroflex [ʈ͡ʂ] rather than dental or alveolar [t͡s]. It has remained distinct only in Selkup, merging elsewhere with *t.

As in Proto-Uralic, the ancestor of Proto-Samoyedic, the first syllable of words was always stressed, and hence there was no contrastive stress. Contrastive tones did not occur either.

=== Phonotactics ===
As in Proto-Uralic, words could begin with a maximum of one consonant: initial consonant clusters were not allowed. Another phonotactic constraint inherited from Proto-Uralic was that the consonants *r and *ŋ were not allowed word-initially. Proto-Samoyedic had, however, innovated final consonant clusters in a few words. In all of them, the first consonant in the cluster was the semivowel *j, as in *wajŋ 'breath'. Thus, the syllable structure of Proto-Samoyedic was altogether (C)V(j)(C).

Inside words, clusters of two consonants were common. Clusters of three consonants were again possible only if the first consonant of the cluster was *j, as in *wajkkǝ̑ 'neck'.

=== Later development ===
Palatalization of consonants, most prominently *k, has occurred in all recorded Samoyedic languages. This is however a post-Proto-Samoyedic development, as the details differ in each branch due to vowel developments.

- The Nenets-Enets group palatalizes both *k and *s to /sʲ/.
- Nganasan, Selkup and Kamassian palatalize *k to a distinct /ʃ/. Nganasan also palatalizes *s to /sʲ/.
- Mator appears to have no palatalization of *k; however, *s is, somewhat unusually, velarized to /k/.
- Nenets-Enets and Nganasan have prominent palatalization of other consonants as well, leading to contraction of the vowel system.

Other widespread developments include prothesis of *ŋ, initial lenition of *p, and fortition of the semivowels *w, *j.

- In Nganasan, Nenets and Enets, PS vowel-initial words gain an initial /ŋ/ via rhinoglottophilia (which may be subsequently palatalized to /nʲ/). This is occasionally found in other Samoyedic languages as well, usually with the exception of Mator.
- PS initial *p is lenited to /f/ in Enets, /h/ in Mator and Nganasan. (/f/ still appears in the oldest Nganasan records.)
- PS initial *w remains only in Nenets. In Selkup, it becomes /kʷ/; all other varieties shift it to /b/.
- PS initial *j remains in both Nenets and Enets. It becomes /tʲ/ in Selkup, and /dʲ/ in other varieties.
- In Mator and Kamassian, /b/, /dʲ/ are furthermore nasalized to /m/, /nʲ/ preceding a word-internal nasal. This has been an areal change, shared also with Siberian Turkic languages such as Khakas.

== Morphology ==
Proto-Samoyedic was a fairly typical agglutinative language with only little morphophonological alteration, apart from vowel harmony. In the following, -A marks an archiphoneme realized as -å in words with back-vocalic harmony, -ä in words with front-vocalic harmony.

Three numbers were distinguished: singular, dual and plural. Possession was indicated with possessive suffixes.

Nouns distinguished seven cases:

- Nominative: (no ending)
- Genitive: *-n
- Accusative: *-m
- Locative: *-kə-nA
- Ablative: *-kə-tə
- Dative: *-kə-
- Prosecutive: *-mə-nA

Verbs were conjugated for mood, tense, number and person. There were also separate subjective and objective conjugations.

Derivational suffixes were numerous, and could form both verbs and nominals.

== Development ==
Most Proto-Samoyedic phonemes continue the corresponding Proto-Uralic phonemes unchanged. The most prominent changes are:

- PU *s, š > PS *t.
- PU *ś > PS *s.
- PU *δ > PS *r.
- PU *δ́ > PS *j.
- PU *l in most positions > PS *j. *l remains initially before PU *i̮, as well as in PS intervocalic positions.
- PU *u > PS *ǝ̑ preceding a PU stem vowel *a.
- PU *i̮ > PS *e̮ in PS closed syllables.
- PU *ü > PS *i. PS *ü is of secondary origin.
- PU stem-final *i is reduced to PS *ə/ǝ̑ (per harmony), and if not preceded by an original consonant cluster, subsequently lost.
- PU *a, o generally become PS *å, though in many cases PS *a also appears; the conditioning for this is not entirely clear.
- PU stem-final *å becomes PS *ä after a lateral consonant (PU *l or *δ́; this points to an intermediate stage *ĺ in the development of the latter.)
- PU *o remains in monosyllabic roots (both primary, and those resulting from loss of final *ø).
- PU *k, *x, *w, *j are lost between vowels in roots of the shape *CVCi, yielding monosyllabic PS roots.
- PU *k and preconsonantal *w are generally lost in medial consonant clusters.

Examples:

- PU *äjmä "needle" > PS *äjmä
- PU *kala "fish" > PS *kålä
- PU *muna "egg" > PS *mǝ̑nå
- PU *weti "water" > PS *wet
- PU *nüδi "handle" > PS *nir
- PU *i̮pti "hair" > PS *e̮ptǝ̑
- PU *täwδi "full" > PS *tärə
- PU *mośki- "to wash" > PS *måsǝ̑-
- PU *suksi "ski" > PS *tutǝ̑
- PU *ńi̮xli "arrow" > PS *ńe̮ǝ̑j
- PU *käxli "tongue" > PS *käəj

== Numerals ==
Proto-Samoyedic numerals with wider Uralic cognates are:

- *ketä '2'
- *säjʔwǝ '7'
- *wüt '10' (cognate with Finno-Ugric numerals for '5')

Innovative Proto-Samoyedic numerals with no apparent wider Uralic cognates:

- *nakur '3'
- *tättǝ '4'
- *sǝmpǝlaŋkǝ '5'
- *mǝktut '6'

== Sources ==
- Janhunen, Juha (1977). Samojedischer Wortschatz: Gemeinsamojedische Etymologien. Castreanumin toimitteita. Vol. 17. Helsinki. ISBN 951-45-1161-1. ISSN 0355-0141.
