= Nenets (disambiguation) =

Nenets may refer to:

- Nenets Autonomous Okrug, a federal subject of Russia
- Yamalo-Nenets Autonomous Okrug, a federal subject of Russia
- Nenets people, a Samoyedic people
- Nenets languages, a small language family of two closely related Samoyedic languages spoken by the Nenets people:
  - Tundra Nenets language
  - Forest Nenets language
