= Khandeyar =

Languages
- Forest Nenets language

Related ethnic groups
- Nenets, other Samoyedic people

The Khandeyar are one of the two groups of the Nenets. They are also known as Forest Nenets or Forest Yurak because they live in the forest region or Taiga instead of the Tundra like the other Nenets. They speak the Forest variety of Nenets.

== Sources ==
- Wixman, Ronald. The People of the USSR: An Ethnographic Handbook, (Armonk: M. E. Sharpe, 1984) p. 102
