= Yurak =

Yurak may refer to:

- Yurats language, also known as Yurak
- Nenets languages, formerly also known as Yurak
- Jeff Yurak (born 1954), American baseball player

== See also ==
- Yuraq
