= Samoyed =

Samoyed may refer to:

- A member of the Samoyedic peoples, indigenous peoples of Siberia who speak the Samoyedic languages (such as the Enets, the Nenets, the Nganasans, and the Selkups)
  - The Samoyedic languages they speak, part of the Uralic family
  - In the past "Samoyeds" referred only to the Nenets people
- Samoyed dog, a Eurasian dog breed descended from hunting and herding dogs from Siberia
