= Samoyedic peoples =

Ethnolinguistic group indigenous to Siberia, Russia

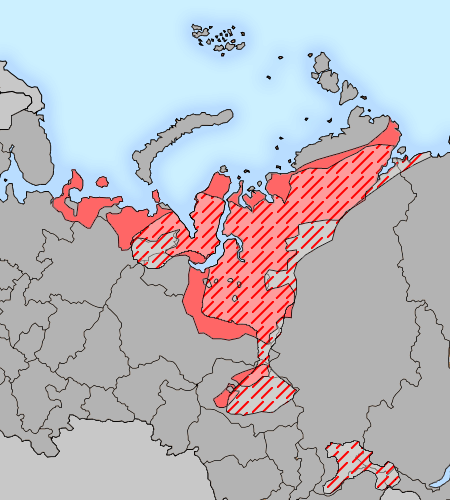
Geographical distribution of Samoyedic-speaking peoples in the 17th (hatched area) and 20th (solid color) centuries

The Samoyedic peoples (sometimes Samodeic peoples) (Note: Some ethnologists use the term 'Samodeic peoples' instead of 'Samoyedic', see Balzer, Marjorie (1999). The Tenacity of Ethnicity. Princeton University Press. p. 241. ISBN 978-0-691-00673-4.) are a group of closely related peoples who speak Samoyedic languages, which are part of the Uralic family. They are a linguistic, ethnic, and cultural grouping. The name derives from the obsolete term Samoyed used in the Russian Empire for some of the indigenous peoples of Siberia.

== Peoples ==
=== Contemporary ===
People	Language	Numbers	Most important territory	Other traditional territories
Nenets	Nenets	45,000	Yamalo-Nenets Autonomous Okrug Nenets Autonomous Okrug Taymyrsky Dolgano-Nenetsky District	Khanty-Mansi Autonomous Okrug
Enets	Enets	200–300	Krasnoyarsk Krai	
Nganasans	Nganasan	900–1000	Krasnoyarsk Krai	
Selkups	Selkup	3,700	Tomsk Oblast Yamalo-Nenets Autonomous Okrug	Krasnoyarsk Krai
Kamasins	Kamassian (extinct)	20 (Note: 0,2% of the population of Sayansky District (21 ppl) are declared as Kamasins and their descendants by the district administration in the official tourist guide (2021).)	Krasnoyarsk Krai	

=== Extinct ===
- Yurats, who spoke Yurats
- Mators or Motors, who spoke Mator

== Classification ==
Traditionally, Samoyedic languages and peoples have been divided into two major areal groups: Northern Samoyedic (Nenets, Yurats, Enets, Nganasans), and Southern Samoyedic (Selkups) with a further subgroup of Sayan-Samoyedic (Kamasins, Mators) named after the Sayan Mountains. This classification does not reflect linguistic relations, being purely geographical.

The most numerous of the Samoyedic peoples are the Nenets, who mainly live in two autonomous districts of Russia: Yamalo-Nenetsia and Nenetsia. Some of the Nenets and most of the Enets and Nganasans used to live in the Taymyrsky Dolgano-Nenetsky District. Most of the Selkups live in Yamalo-Nenetsia, but there is also a significant population in Tomsk Oblast.

== Gallery ==
=== Historical pictures ===
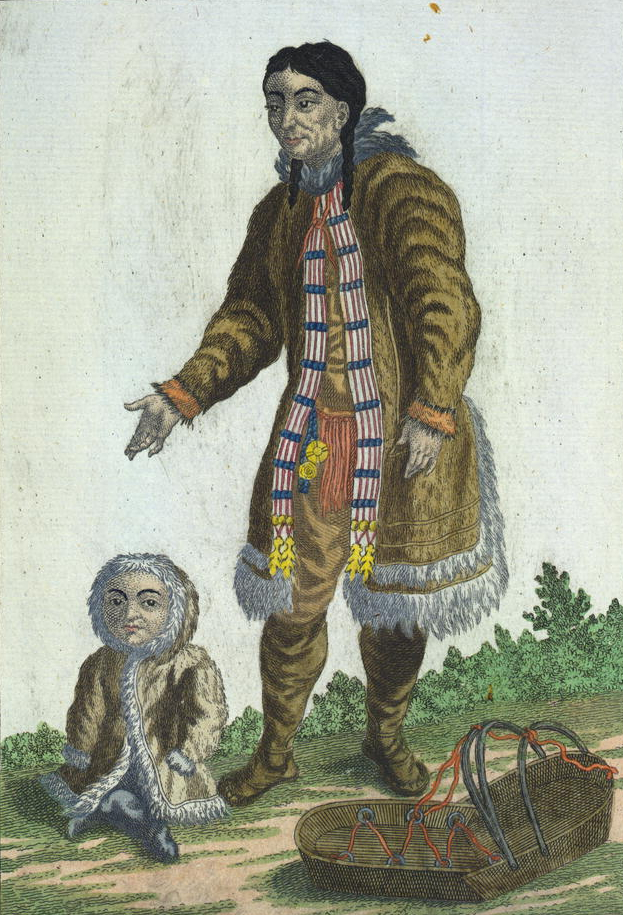
Samoyed in summer dress, in 1781, by Johann Gottlieb Georgi

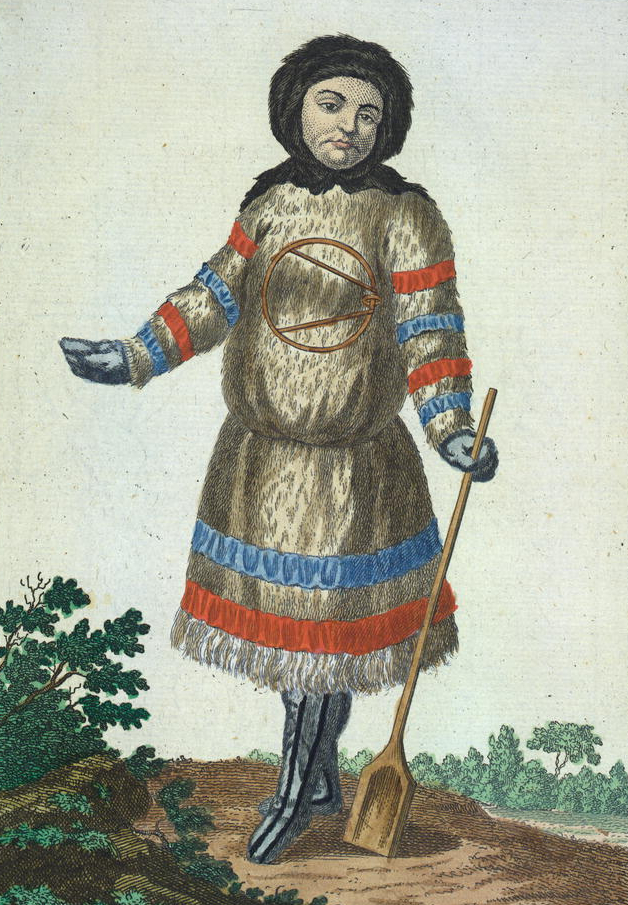
Samoyed in 1781 by Johann Gottlieb Georgi

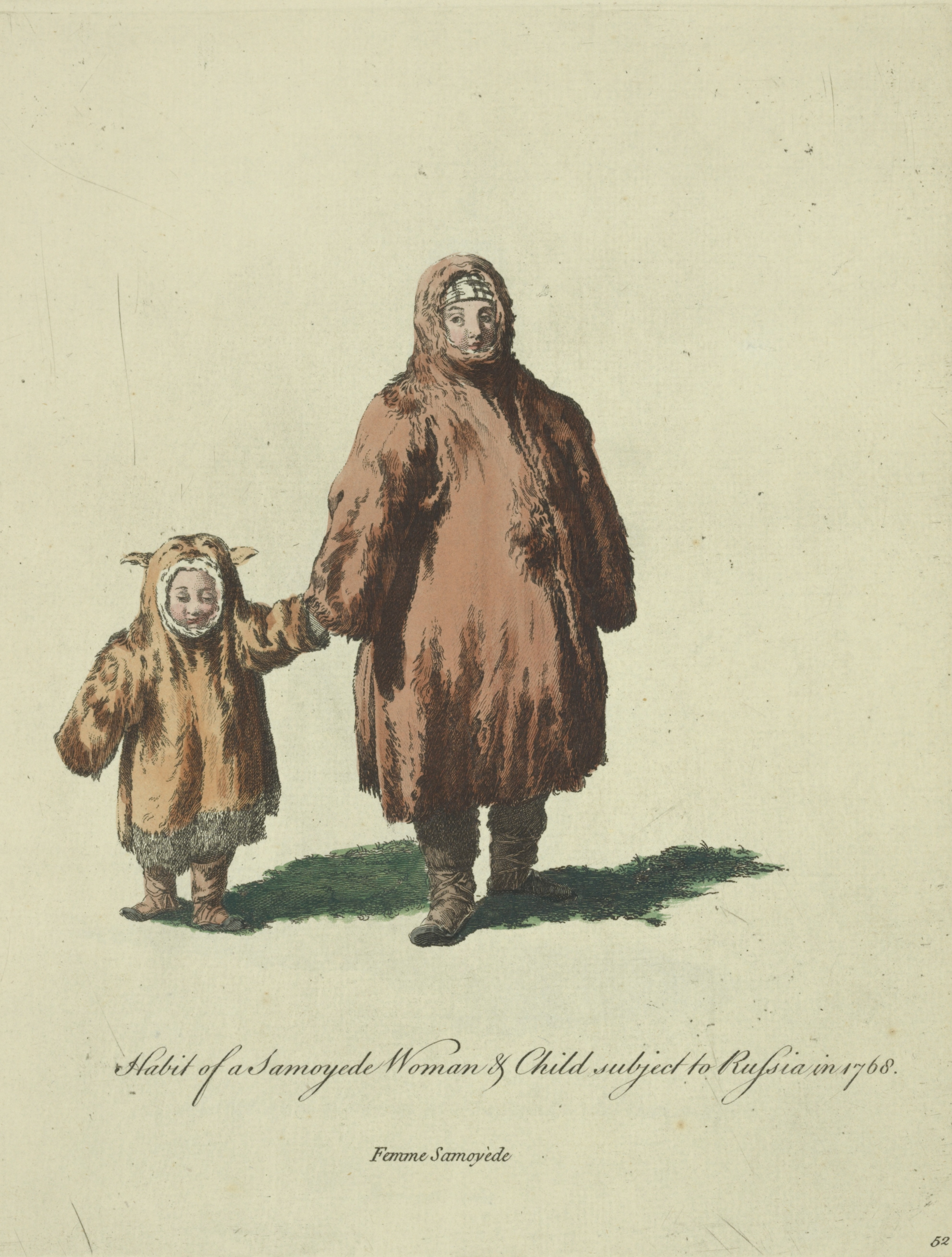
Habit of a Samoyed woman and child in 1768, by Jean-Baptiste Chappe d'Auteroche

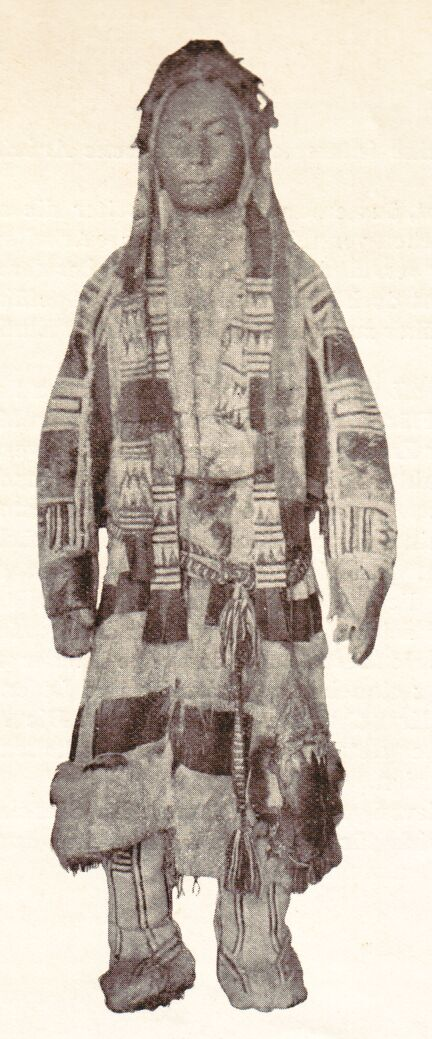
Samoyed winter dress (before 1906)

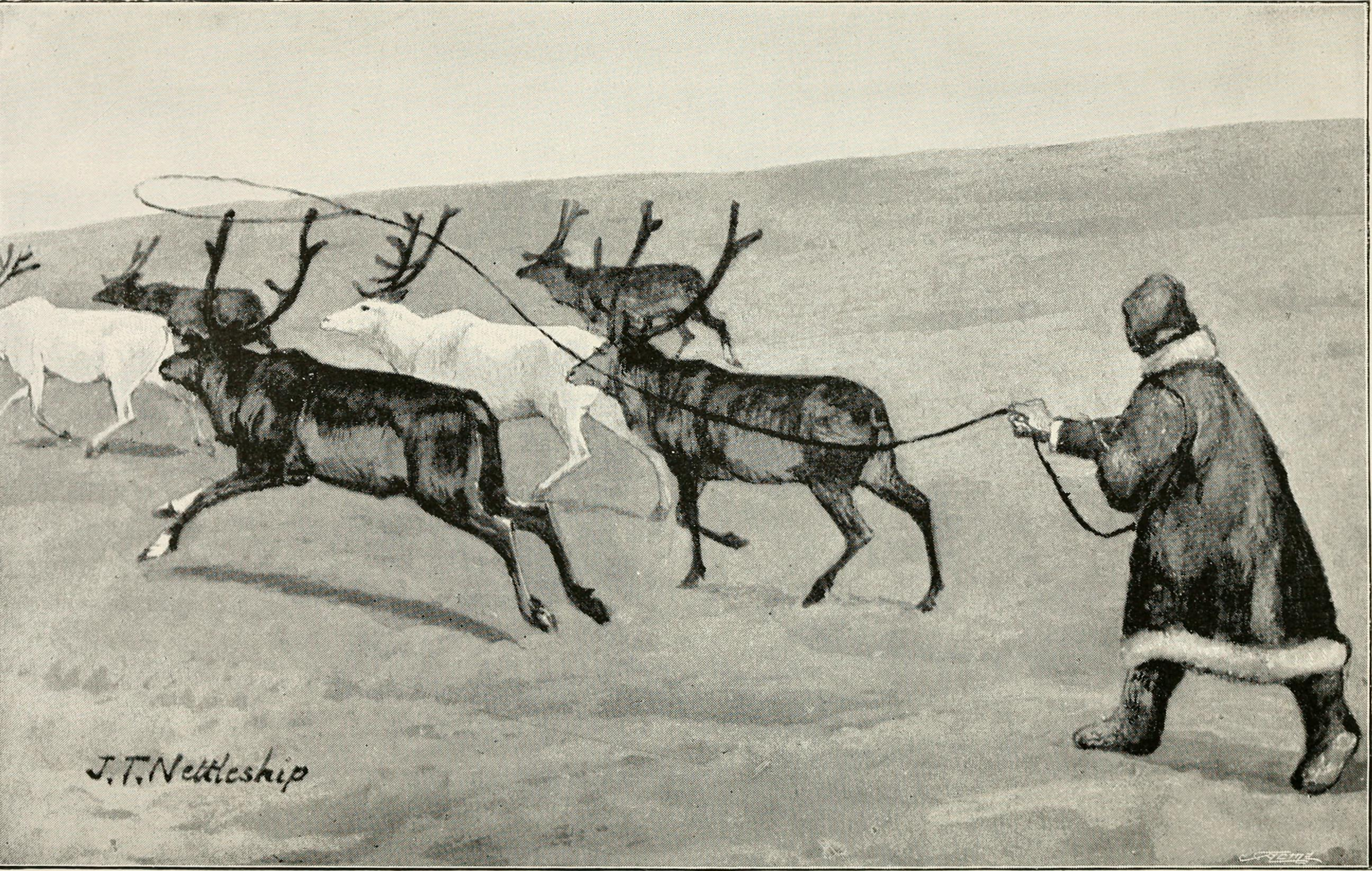
A reindeer herd in Kolguyev Island in 1895.

=== Modern ===
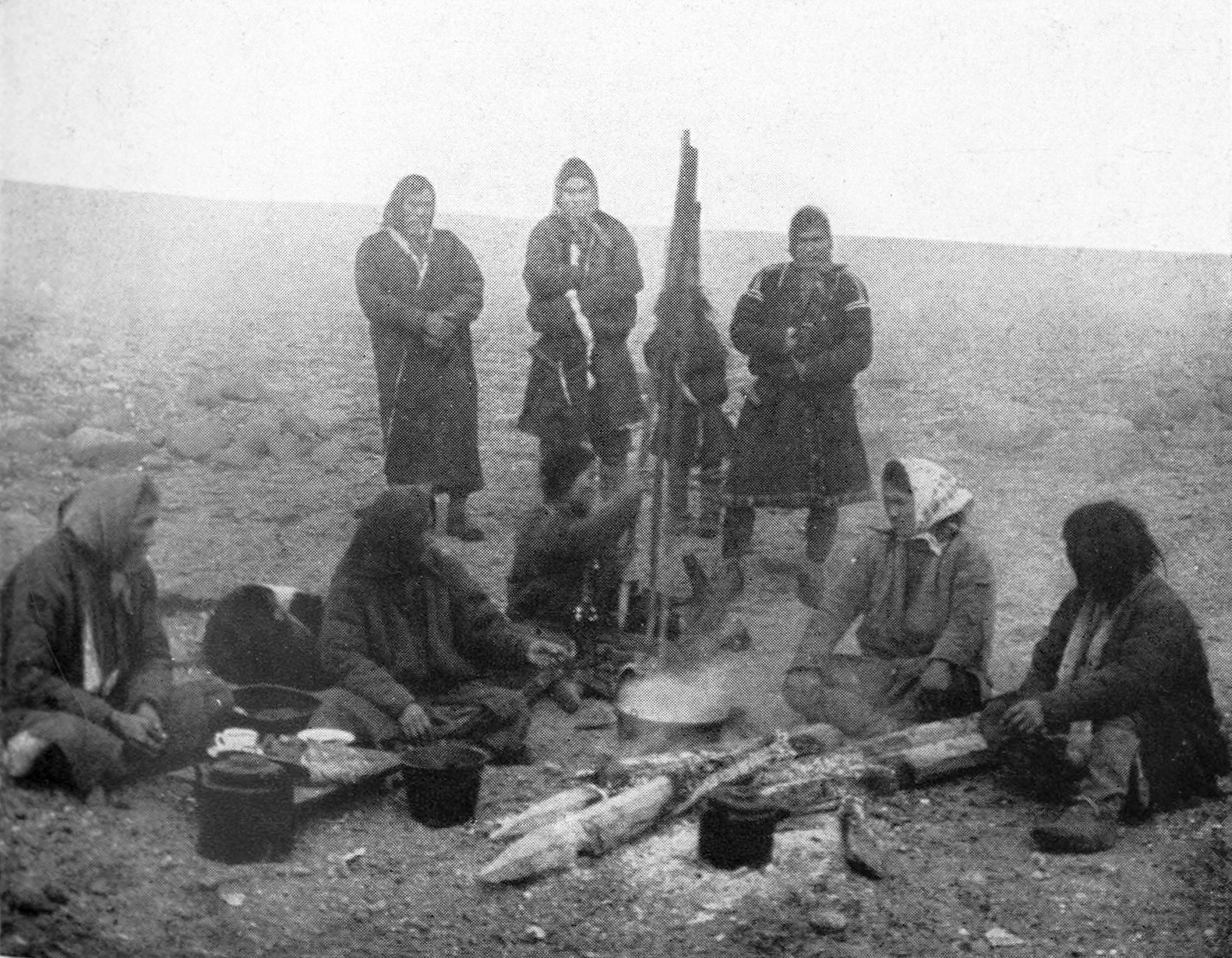
Yenisei Samoyedes (Enets people) around a campfire (1914)

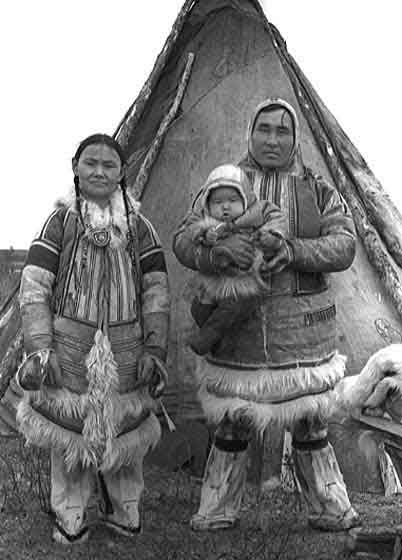
Nganasans, 1927

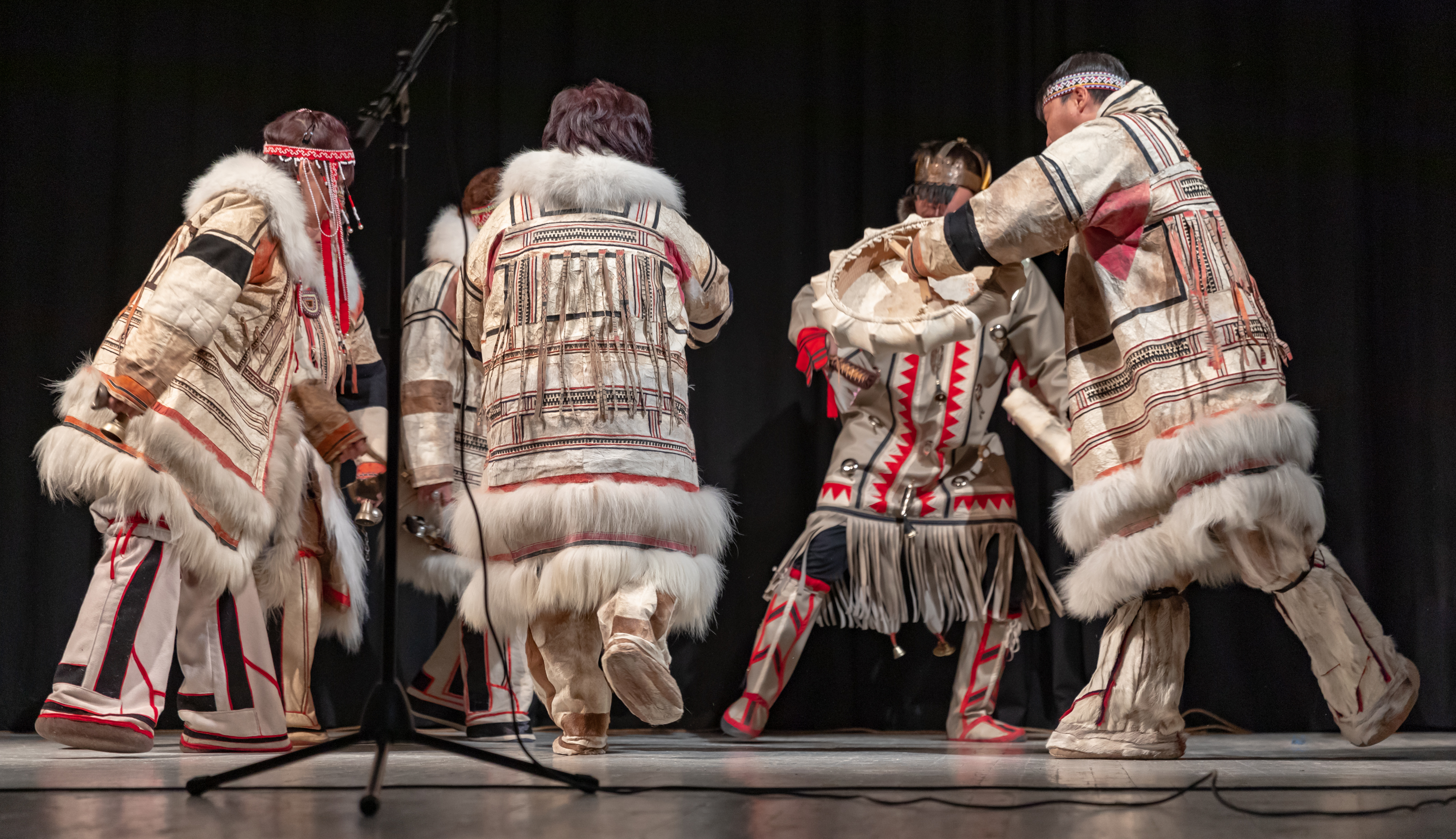
Nganasan folkloric group, 2018

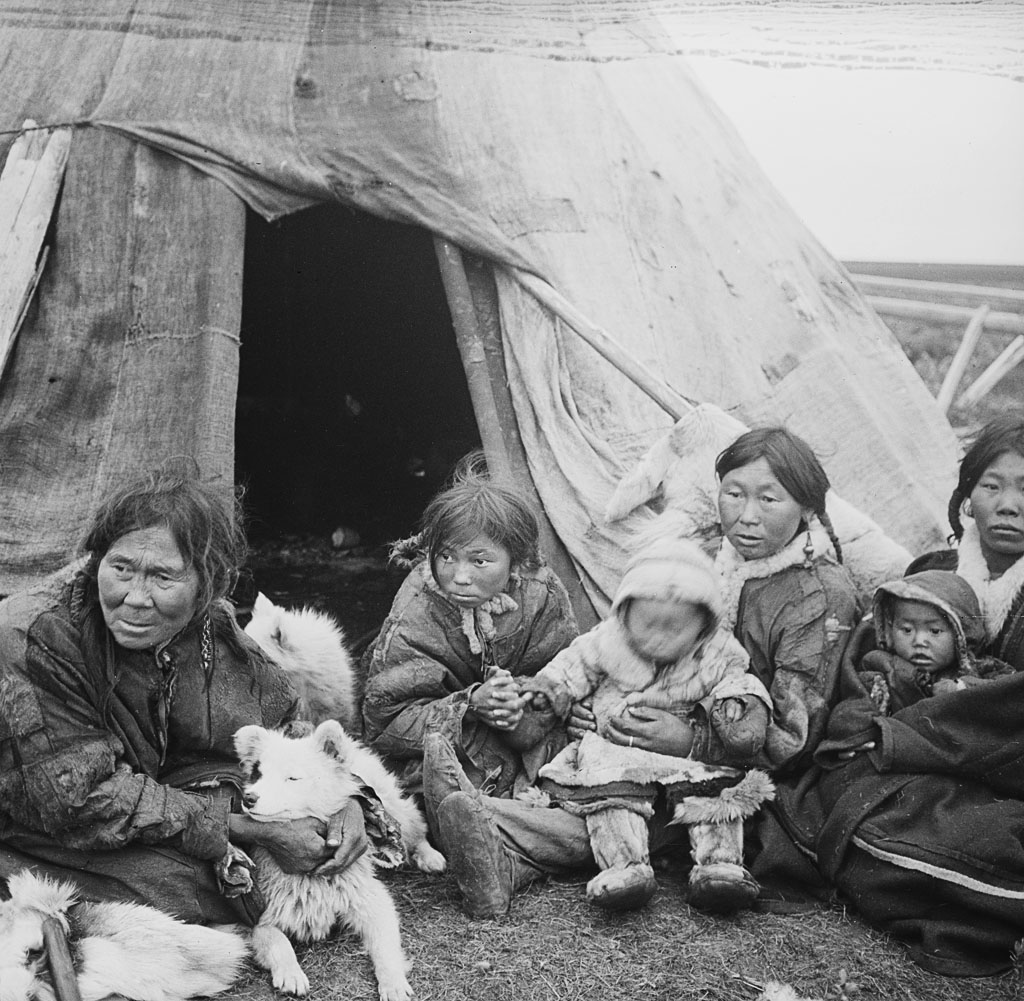
Nenets group, 1913

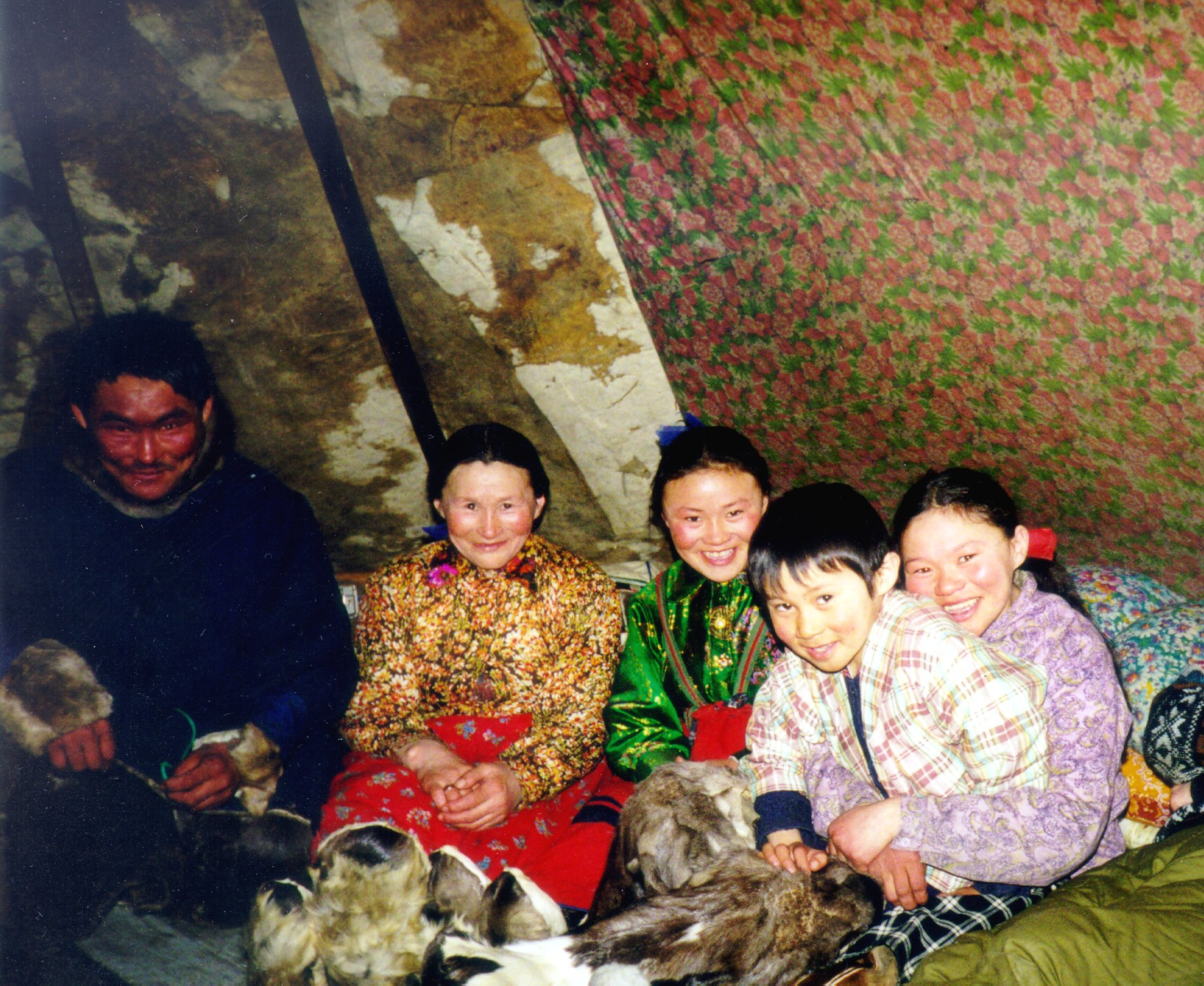
Nenets family

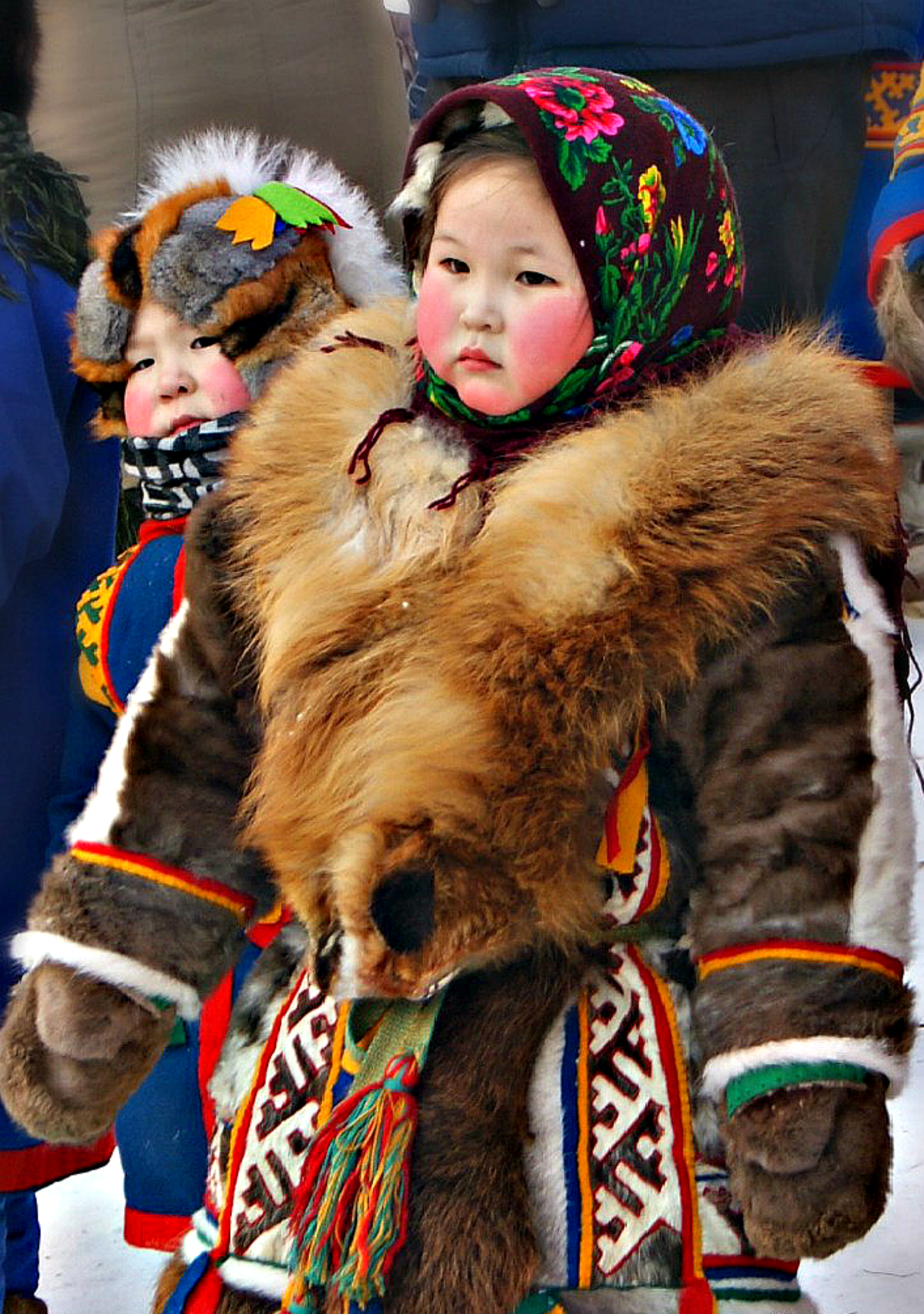
Nenets children, 2016

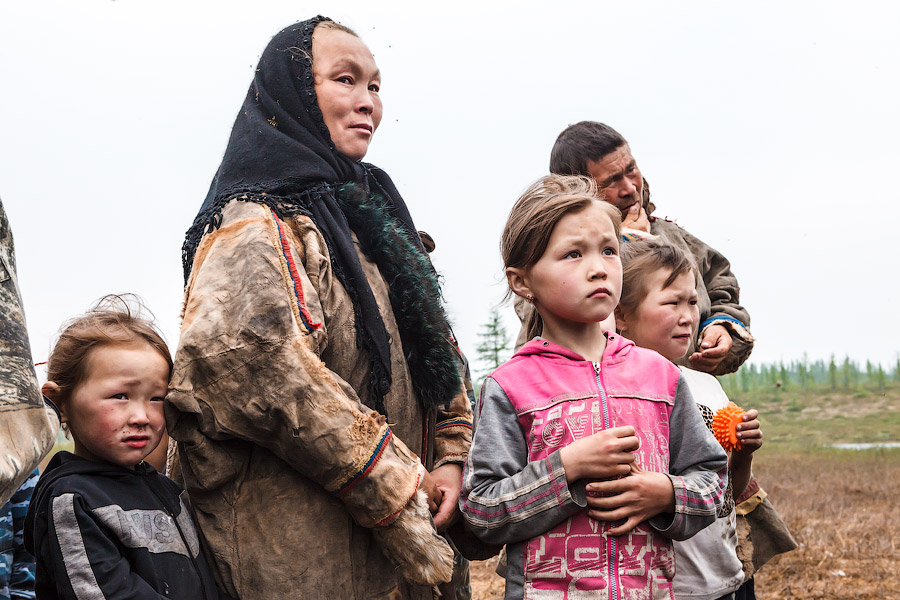
Northern Selkups, 2012

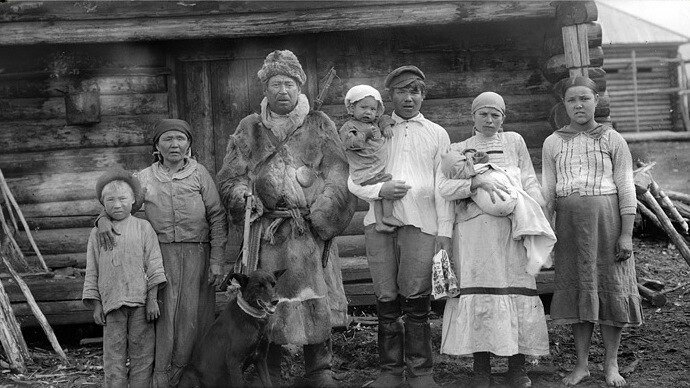
Kamasin family, 1925

== See also ==
- Samoyed dog
