= Lyamin =

Lyamin (Russian: Лямин) is a Russian masculine surname. Its feminine counterpart is Lyamina. Notable people with the surname include:

- Kirill Lyamin (born 1986), Russian ice hockey player

== See also ==
- Lyamin (river), a tributary of the Ob in Russia
