= Captative verb =

Verbs of hunting of a specific animal

Captative verbs indicate catching and hunting of a specific animal or other target, e.g. English to fish.

Usually captatives are not separately marked, but some Uralic languages do this. Nenets, Sami languages and Finnish have a captative marker for marking captative verbs; in Nenets, the marker is exclusively used for this purpose. For example, Northern Sami murjet "to pick berries" is derived from muorji "berry". Also, Finnish has captative verbs marked by -sta-, e.g. marja/sta/a "to pick berries", kala/sta/a "to fish", metsä/stä/ä "to hunt".
