= Tukhard =

Tukhard Тухард
- Rural locality (selo)
- Location within Krasnoyarsk Krai Location within Russia
- Coordinates: 69°17′48″N 84°19′56″E
- Country: Russia
- Region: Krasnoyarsk Krai
- District: Taymyrsky Dolgano-Nenetsky District

Population (2010)
  - Total: 814
- Time zone: UTC+7

Tukhard (Russian: Тухард) is a rural locality (a selo) in Taymyrsky Dolgano-Nenetsky District, Krasnoyarsk Krai in northern Russia, 75 kilometres (47 mi) west of Dudinka in the Gydanskii tundra, on the banks of the Bolshaya Kheta River, 40 kilometres (25 mi) from its confluence with the Yenisey. Inhabited by the Nenets people, it is noted for its natural gas production by the company Norilskgazprom along the Messoyakha-Dudinka-Norilsk gas pipeline, and its reindeer herding and meat and fishing. In 2010 it had a population of 814 people.

== History ==
In 1968, the village of Tukhard was formed as the starting point for the construction of the Messoyakha-Dudinka-Norilsk gas pipeline, and Norilskgazprom established a transshipment base on the banks of the Bolshaya Kheta. The workers for Norilskgazprom built the first buildings in Tukhard.The name of the village is a combination of two Nenets words: "tu" - fire and "harad" meaning house - meaning "a place where fire is made" (natural gas).

In the 1970s, a runway was built in Tukhard to cater for small aircraft. In 1978, the executive committee of the district council decided to divide the Oktyabrsky state farm in the Ust-Yenisei region into a reindeer herding and fishing farm. In 1979, drilling rigs and equipment for the Tukhard state farm were delivered to gas producers by the Fyodor Bondar tugboat.

On May 25, 2002, the village of Tukhard, which was previously subordinate to the administration of Dudinka, was transferred to the administration of the Ust-Yenisei region, and is one of the largest villages within the Karaul rural settlement area. In 2010 the settlement had a population of 814 people.

== Economy and facilities ==
Tukhard lies along the Messoyakha gas pipeline, connecting it with Dudinka and Norilsk. Three quarters of the community households are nomadic pastoralists, and the village is known for its reindeer meat. In 1985, the village had 15,882 reindeer, and by 2011 this had increased to over 29,000, with around 50 families employed in the industry. 20 families are employed in the fishing industry.

The village has an elementary school, a hospital, a library, a post office, a rural house of culture, a bakery, and private shops. There are 83 houses and 119 apartments in Tukhard.

== Culture ==
The rare Enets language is spoken by several inhabitants of the village. On the second and third Sundays of April, the Day of the Reindeer Breeder festival is held. Reindeer sled races are held by the locals along the frozen Bolshaya Kheta River.
