= Forest Nenets language =

Samoyedic language

Forest Nenets
- Neshan, Forest Yurak
- нешаӈ вата nešaŋ vata
- Pronunciation: [nʲeːʃ(ʲ)ɑŋ βːɑtɑ]
- Native to: Northern Russia
- Region: Yamalo-Nenets Autonomous Okrug, Khanty-Mansi Autonomous Okrug
- Ethnicity: Forest Nenets
- Native speakers: (1,500 cited 1989) (5% of Nenets speakers)
- Language family: Uralic: Samoyedic; (core); Enets–Nenets; Nenets; Forest Nenets

Language codes
- ISO 639-3: –
- Glottolog: fore1274
- ELP: Forest Nenets
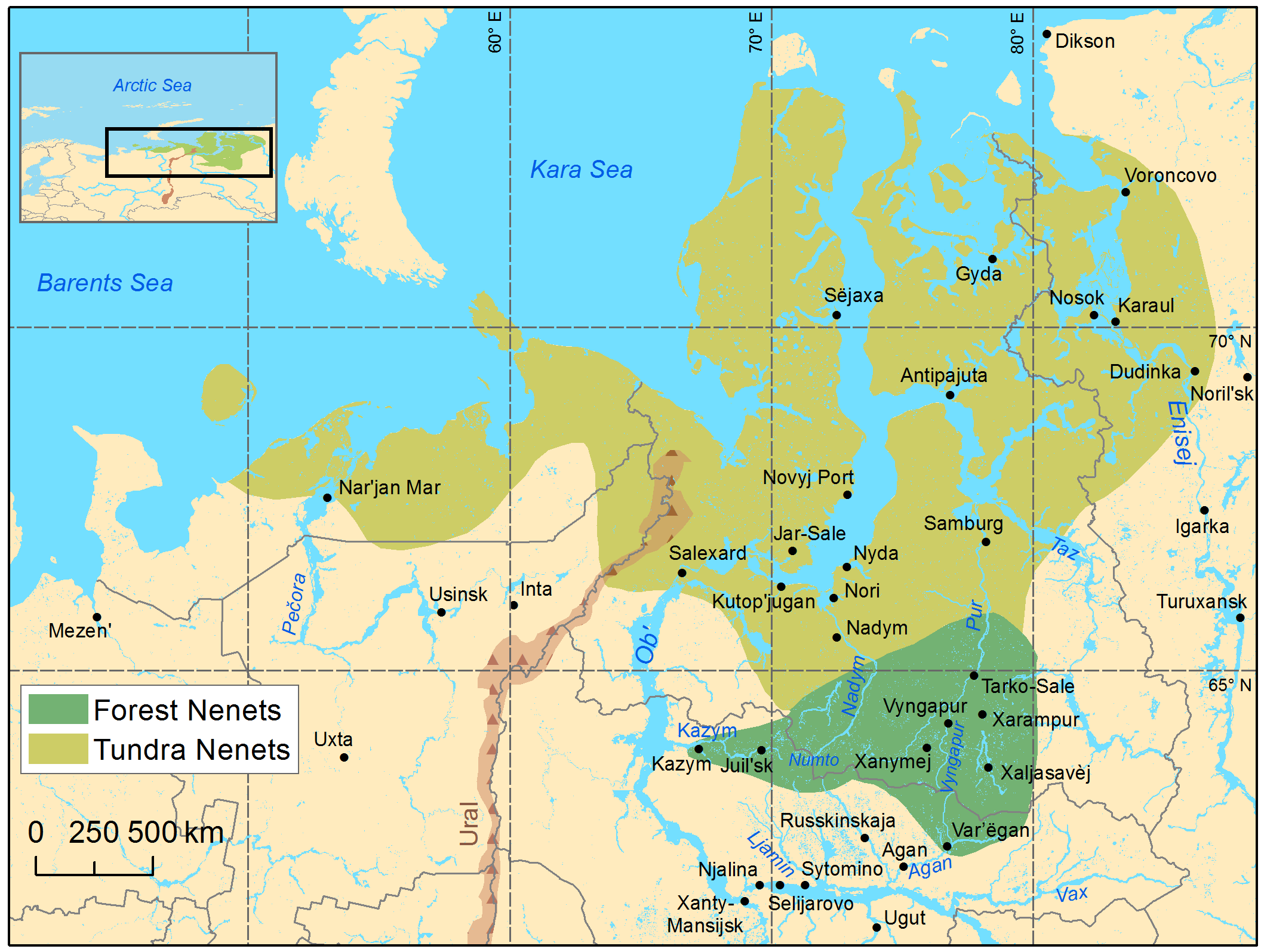
- Distribution of Nenets languages in the 21st century.

- Forest Nenets is classified as Severely Endangered by the UNESCO Atlas of the World's Languages in Danger (2010)

Forest Nenets (Neshan; endonym: нешаӈ вата, nešaŋ vata, Nenets pronunciation: [nʲeːʃ(ʲ)ɑŋ βːɑtɑ]) is a Samoyedic language spoken in northern Russia, around the Agan, Pur, Lyamin and Nadym rivers, by the Nenets people. It is closely related to the Tundra Nenets language, and the two are still sometimes seen as simply being dialects of a single Nenets language, despite there being low mutual intelligibility between the two. The next closest relatives are Nganasan and Enets, after them Selkup, and even more distantly the other Uralic languages.

== Phonology ==
=== Vowels ===
In stressed syllables, the vowel phonemes of the Forest Nenets dialect are:

	Front		Back	
	Short	Long	Short	Long
High	i	iː	u	uː
Mid	(e)	eː	(o)	oː
Low	æ	æː	ɑ	ɑː

In unstressed syllables length is not contrastive, and there are only five vowel qualities: [æ ɑ ə i u]. Word stress is not fixed to a certain position of a root; this leads to alternations of stressed mid vowels with unstressed high vowels. Long vowels are slightly more common than short vowels, though only short vowels occur in monosyllabic words. The short mid vowels /e o/ are marginal, occurring only in a small number of monosyllabic words and commonly merged into the corresponding high vowels /i u/. This is additionally complicated by the short high vowels /i u/ becoming lowered to [e o] before /ə/. Because of this, Salminen (2007) argued that the long vowels should be considered the basic and the short vowels the marked phonemes.

/æː/ and its unstressed counterpart only occur in non-palatal syllables and may be realized as a diphthong [ae] or [aɛ]. Short /æ/ is usually [aj] (and is also written as ай, though this spelling also represents the sequence /ɑj/), but alternates with its long counterpart in the same way as the other short vowels.

Some western dialects lack /æ/, replacing it with /e/.

==== Reduced vowel ====
Forest Nenets and its sister dialect, Tundra Nenets, have long been thought to have a so-called "reduced vowel". This reduced vowel was thought to have had two distinct qualities depending on whether or not it was subject to stress in the word or not. It has been historically transcribed as ⟨ø⟩ when stressed, representing a reduced variant of an underlying vowel, and as ⟨â⟩, representing a reduced variant of /a/, when unstressed. Recent developments indicate, however, that the reduced vowels are in fact short vowels which act as counterparts to their respective long vowels. The transcription ⟨â⟩ is more properly replaced and represented by ⟨a⟩, while ⟨ø⟩ simply represents a short vowel, although this orthography does not delineate its exact phonetic value.

=== Consonants ===
Forest Nenets has a system of 24 consonant phonemes:

	Bilabial		Alveolar				Velar		Glottal
	Bilabial		median		lateral		Velar		Glottal
	plain	pala.	plain	pala.	plain	pala.	plain	pala.	Glottal
Nasal	m	mʲ	n	nʲ			ŋ	ŋʲ	
Stop	p	pʲ	t	tʲ			k	kʲ	ʔ
Fricative			s	sʲ	ɬ	ɬʲ	x	xʲ	
Approximant	w	wʲ			l	lʲ		j	

Voicing is not contrastive, but most consonants contrast palatalization.

A rhotic consonant /r/ may appear in recent loanwords. Older /r/, /rʲ/ have recently shifted to lateral fricatives /ɬ/, /ɬʲ/.

The palatalized alveolars /tʲ/, /sʲ/ are typically realized as alveolo-palatals [tɕ], [ɕ].

== Orthography ==
Nenets is written with an adapted form of Cyrillic, incorporating the supplemental letters Ӈ, ʼ, and ˮ.

А а

а

Б б

бе

В в

ве

Г г

ге

Д д

де

Е е

е

Ё ё

ё

Ж ж

же

З з

зе

И и

и

Й й
К к

ка

Л л

ел

М м

ем

Н н

ен

Ӈ ӈ

еӈ

О о

о

П п

пе

Р р

ер

С с

ес

Т т

те

У у

у

Ф ф

еф

Х х

ха

Ц ц

це

Ч ч

че

Ш ш

ша

Щ щ

ща

Ъ ъ

ъ

Ы ы

ы

Ь ь

ь

Э э

э

Ю ю

ю

Я я

я

ʼ
ˮ

== Typology ==
The language is rather synthetic, so one word can contain many grammatical meanings:

Чикен нешатяай’колымта ” катаӈата.

Чикен	неша-тяай-’колы-м-та-”	ката-ӈа-та
there	father-AUG-CHAR-ACC.SG-POSS.3.SG-MOD	to.kill-АOR-OBJ.3.SG.SG

“And there (he) killed his father, the poor man.”
