= Yurats language =

Extinct Samoyedic language

Yurats
- Yurak
- Native to: Russia
- Region: west of the Yenisey, Gyda Peninsula
- Ethnicity: Yurats
- Extinct: early 19th century
- Language family: Uralic: Samoyedic; (core); Enets–Nenets; Yurats

Language codes
- ISO 639-3: rts
- Glottolog: yura1256 Yurats
- Yurats is classified as Extinct by the UNESCO Atlas of the World's Languages in Danger of Disappearing (2001)

Yurats (Yurak) was a Samoyedic language spoken in the Siberian tundra west of the Yenisei River. It became extinct in the early 19th century, due to the expansion of the Nenets people. Yurats was probably either a transitional variety connecting the Nenets and Enets languages of the Samoyedic family, or an archaic dialect of Enets. While it is marginally closer to Enets rather than Nenets, it does not show a majority of either Enets or Nenets features. Some eastern dialects of Tundra Nenets may have a Yurats substrate, as the Yurats were likely absorbed by the Tundra Nenets. The uncertainty regarding the language's status is due to the scarcity of information about the language. Nevertheless, Glottolog considers it to be a dialect of Tundra Nenets, as is the traditional assumption.
