= Messoyakha Gas Field =

Natural gas field

Messoyakha gas field
- Country: Russia
- Location: West Siberian Basin
- Offshore/onshore: Onshore
- Operator: Gazprom Neft
- Partners: Rosneft, Messoyakhaneftegaz

Field history
- Start of production: 1970; since 1980 intermittently during the summer
- Abandonment: 1978 to 1980

The Messoyakha gas field is a natural gas field located in the north of the West Siberian Basin in the Taymyrsky Dolgano-Nenetsky District, where there are many large fields, and where the presence of gas hydrates has been documented. Located 340 km north of Novy Urengoy, they are Russians northernmost fields. They are operated by Gazprom Neft. The license holders are Messoyakhaneftegaz and a joint venture between Gazprom Neft and Rosneft. The oil from the fields is transported via Zapolyarye-Purpe Oil Pipeline.

== Production history ==
In 1969, the Messoyakha-Dudinka-Norilsk natural gas pipeline was laid in the Taymyr Autonomous Okrug. (Note: For location of the Messoyakha-Norilsk natural gas pipeline, see infrastructure of the oil and gas complex in the Taymyr Autonomous Okrug) The industries in both Dudinka for shipping non-ferrous metals, coal, and ore, and Norilsk, such as the Norilsk railway and the Norilsk Mining and Smelting Factory, greatly benefited from the natural gas supplied from Messoyakha.

Messoyakha was brought into production in 1970 and was brought out of production by 1978. Production was resumed at a significantly lower rate in 1980 with intermittent production during the summer season and continues to this day. During the initial production rate the pressure drop in the reservoir did not decrease as rapidly as expected and increased by 2 megapascals (20 atm) when shut-off between 1978-80.

Petroleum engineers and geologists point to the subsequent production from 1980 and the increase in pressure as evidence of the gas hydrates producing into the Messoyakha reservoir formation.

=== Messoyakha Gas Hydrates Reservoir ===
The Messoyakha gas field is often used as an example of production of in-situ gas hydrates. There is conflicting evidence as to whether the gas hydrates are being produced currently with some research indicating that the production data demonstrates their production. Other research suggest that the gas hydrates are not contributing to the current production. The Messoyakha reservoir is located underneath the gas hydrate where it is believed that the depressurization of the reservoir due to conventional gas production led to the depressurization and dissociation of gas from the hydrates. The Messoyakha gas field is enclosed in an anticlinal structure trap and is overlain by a 420 to 480 metres (1,380 to 1,570 ft) thick permafrost zone.
