= Samoyedic languages =

Uralic languages of northern Russia

Samoyedic
- Samoyed
- Geographic distribution: Northern Eurasia
- Linguistic classification: Uralic: Samoyedic
- Proto-language: Proto-Samoyedic
- Subdivisions: Nganasan; Mator †; Core Samoyedic • Enets–Nenets • Kamas–Selkup

Language codes
- ISO 639-5: syd
- Glottolog: samo1298
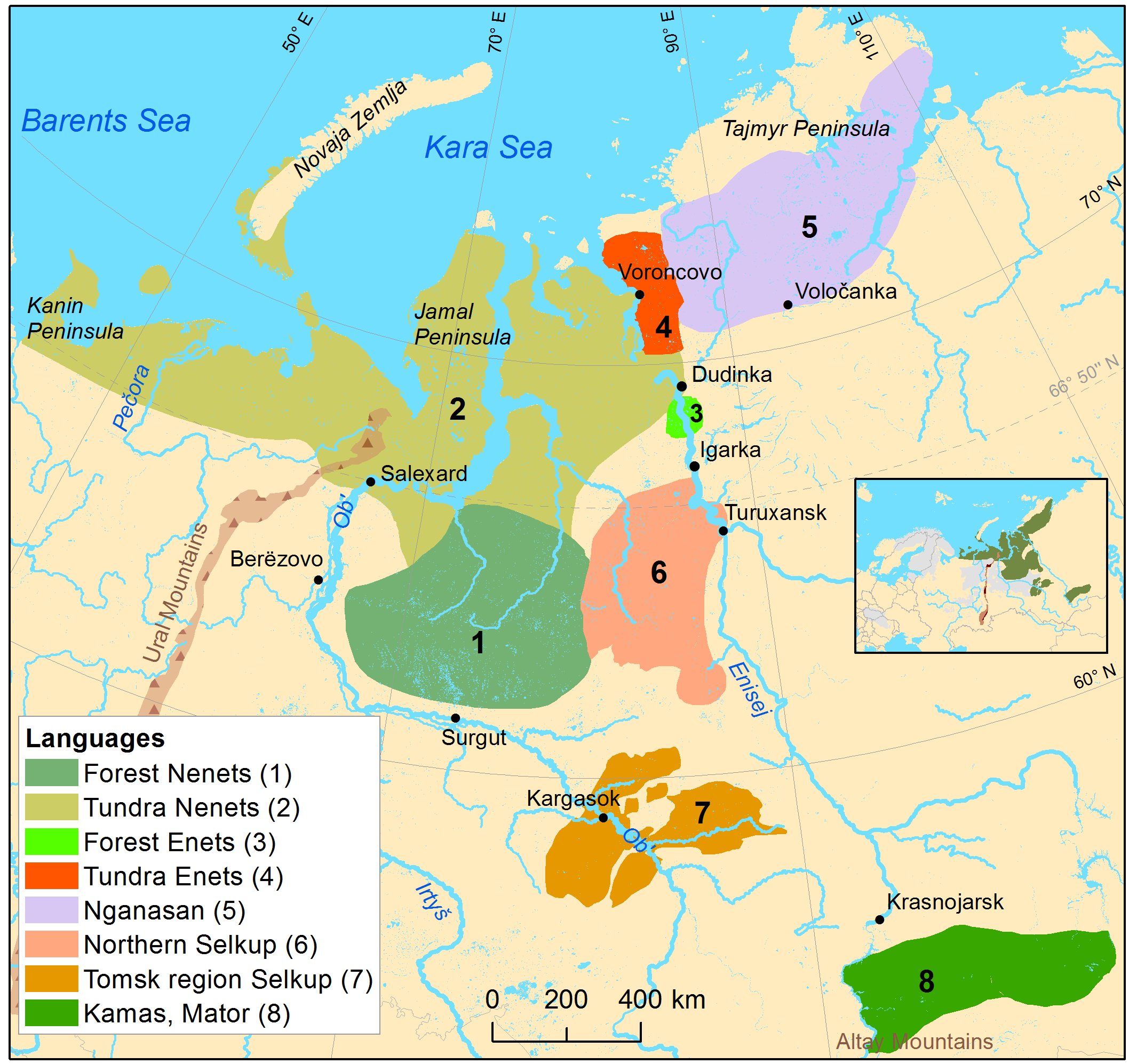
- Samoyedic languages at the beginning of the 20th century

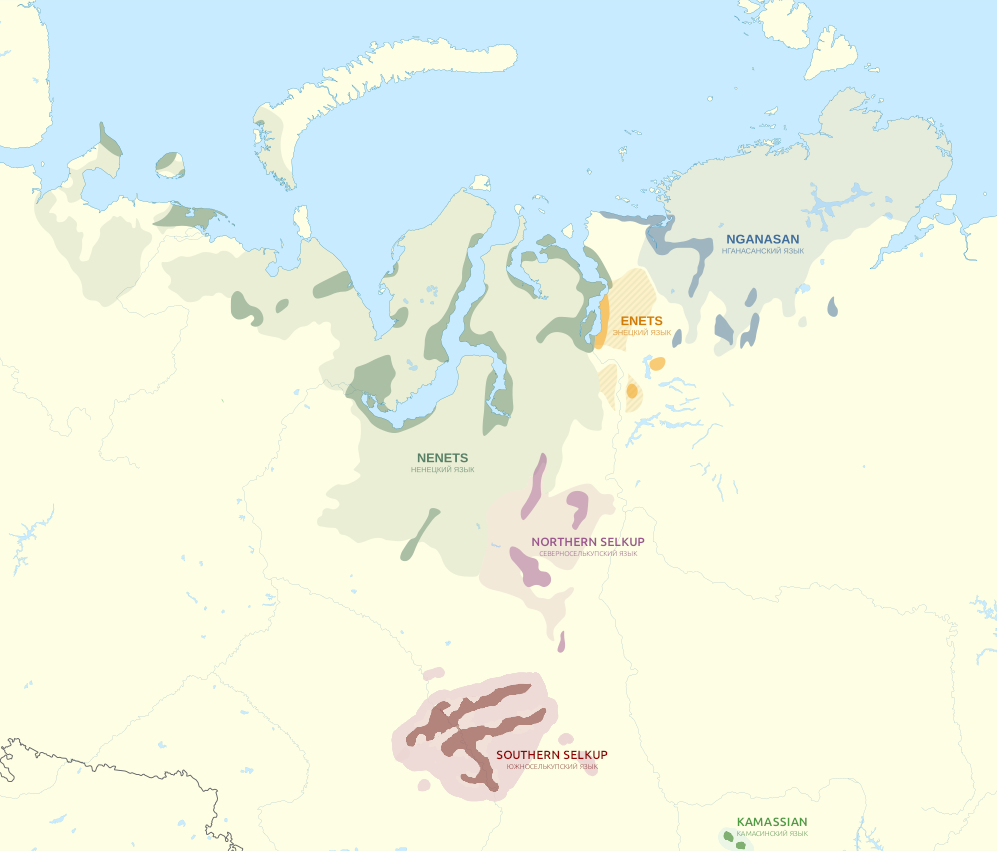
- Current geographic distribution of Samoyedic languages in Russia

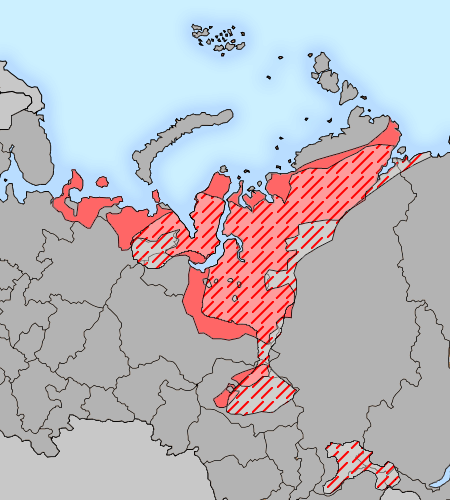
Geographical distribution of Samoyedic languages in the 17th century (hatched) and in the 20th century (solid).

The Samoyedic (/ˌsæməˈjɛdɪk, -mɔɪ-/) or Samoyed languages (/ˈsæməˌjɛd, -mɔɪ-/) are spoken in Siberia and the northeasternmost part of European Russia by approximately 25,000 people, the Samoyedic peoples. They derive from a common ancestral language called Proto-Samoyedic, and form a branch of the Uralic languages. Having separated perhaps in the last centuries BC, they are not a diverse group of languages, and are traditionally considered to be an outgroup, branching off first from the other Uralic languages.

== Etymology ==
The term Samoyedic is derived from the Russian term samoyed (Russian: самоед) originally applied only to the Nenets people and later extended to other related peoples.

One of the theories supposes that the term is interpreted by some ethnologists as originating somewhat derogatorily from Russian samo-yed, literally meaning 'self-eater' (the word has been interpreted by foreign travelers as an allegation of cannibalism).

Another suggestion for the term's origin is a corruption of the expression saam-edne, meaning "Land of the Saams". The word Samodeic has been proposed as an alternative by some ethnologists.

== Classification ==
Traditionally, the Samoyedic languages have been divided into two major areal groups: Northern Samoyedic (Nenets, Yurats, Enets, Nganasan) and Southern Samoyedic (Selkup, Kamas, Mator) with the extinct Kamas and Mator languages being further grouped under Sayan Samoyedic, named after the Sayan Mountains. They are however purely geographical, and do not reflect linguistic relations.

Genealogical classifications point to an early divergence of Nganasan and (perhaps to a lesser degree) Mator, with Enets–Nenets–Yurats and Kamas–Selkup forming internal branches.

- Samoyedic
  - Nganasan (Tavgi or Tawgi-Samoyed)
    - Avam
    - Vadey/Vadeyev
  - Core-Samoyedic
    - Enets-Nenets
      - Enets (Yenisei-Samoyed)
        - Tundra Enets
        - Forest Enets
      - Yurats †
      - Nenets (Yurak-Samoyed)
        - Tundra Nenets
        - Forest Nenets
    - Kamas-Selkup
      - Selkup
        - Northern Selkup
        - Southern Selkup
      - Kamassian (Sayan-Samoyed) †
        - Kamas
        - Koibal
  - Mator (Sayan-Samoyed) †
    - Mator
    - Taigi
    - Karagas

== Grammar ==
Samoyedic languages are primarily agglutinative. They have postpositions and suffixes and do not use articles or prefixes. Samoyedic languages also have grammatical evidentiality. Word order in Samoyedic languages is typically subject-object-verb (SOV). Below are two sentences in Nenets that demonstrate SOV word order and case in Samoyedic languages:

Säxäko boľńica-xana me
Seheko hospital-LOC be.[3SG]
"Seheko is in the hospital."

toxolkoda klass-xana me
student classroom-LOC be.[3SG]
"The student is in the classroom."

=== Nouns ===
Nouns in Samoyedic languages do not have gender, but they are declined for number (singular, dual, and plural) as well as case. All Samoyedic languages have at least seven noun cases which may include nominative, genitive, dative, accusative, ablative, locative, instrumental, lative, and/or prolative depending on the language.

=== Verbs ===
Many Samoyedic languages have the following three conjugation types: subjective, objective (in which the number of the object is expressed in addition to that of the subject), and reflexive. Verbs in Samoyedic languages have multiple moods, ranging from at least eight in Selkup to at least sixteen in Nenets. Other forms of verbs that can be found in Samoyedic languages are gerunds, participles, and infinitives. Of the Samoyedic languages, only Selkup has verbal aspect.

== Phonology ==
Sonorant-obstruent consonant clusters with two consonants, of which the latter consonant is more sonorous than the former, are the most frequently occurring consonant clusters in several Samoyedic languages. Conversely, consonant clusters ending in glides are not found in any Samoyedic languages.

Unlike some other Uralic languages, Samoyedic languages do not have vowel harmony.

Vowel epenthesis is frequently used in Samoyedic languages to break up consonant clusters, particularly in the case of loanwords from Russian.

Vowel epenthesis from Russian to Nenets

- крупа (krupa) > xurupa "cereals"
- класс (klass) > xalas "class"

Vowel epenthesis from Russian to Nganasan

- бригада (brigada) > birigadә "brigade"
- метр (metr) > metәrә "meter"

Vowel epenthesis from Russian to Selkup

- стекло (stʲeklo) > tʲekɨla "glass"
- стол (stol) > istol "table"

== Contact with Russian language ==
Samoyedic languages have experienced significant language contact with Russian to such an extent that members of the Nenets, Selkup, Nganasan, and Enets ethnic groups now often have Russian as a first language, with speakers of Samoyedic languages primarily belonging to elder age groups.

Russian loanwords in Samoyedic languages include колхоз ("collective farm"), машина ("car"), молоко ("milk"), and Москва ("Moscow").

== Geographical distribution ==
At present, Samoyed territory extends from the White Sea to the Laptev Sea, along the Arctic shores of European Russia, including southern Novaya Zemlya, the Yamal Peninsula, the mouths of the Ob and the Yenisei rivers, and into the Taimyr peninsula in northernmost Siberia. They are contiguous with the trans-Ural Ugric speakers and the cis-Ural Komi to the south, but they are cut off from the Baltic Finns by the Russians in the west. The northern Turkic Sakha traditionally live in the east. A substantial Samoyed city grew up at Mangazeya in the 16th century as a trade city, but was destroyed at the beginning of the 17th century.

The Southern Samoyedic languages, of which only the Selkup language has survived to the present day, historically ranged across a wide territory in central Siberia, extending from the basin of the Ob River in the west to the Sayan-Baikal uplands in the east. Records up to the 18th century sporadically report several further entities such as "Abakan", "Kagmasin", "Soyot", though there is no clear evidence for any of these constituting separate languages, and all available data appears to be explainable as these having been simply early forms of Kamassian or Mator.
