= Enets =

Samoyedic ethnic group in Siberia

Enets энцы
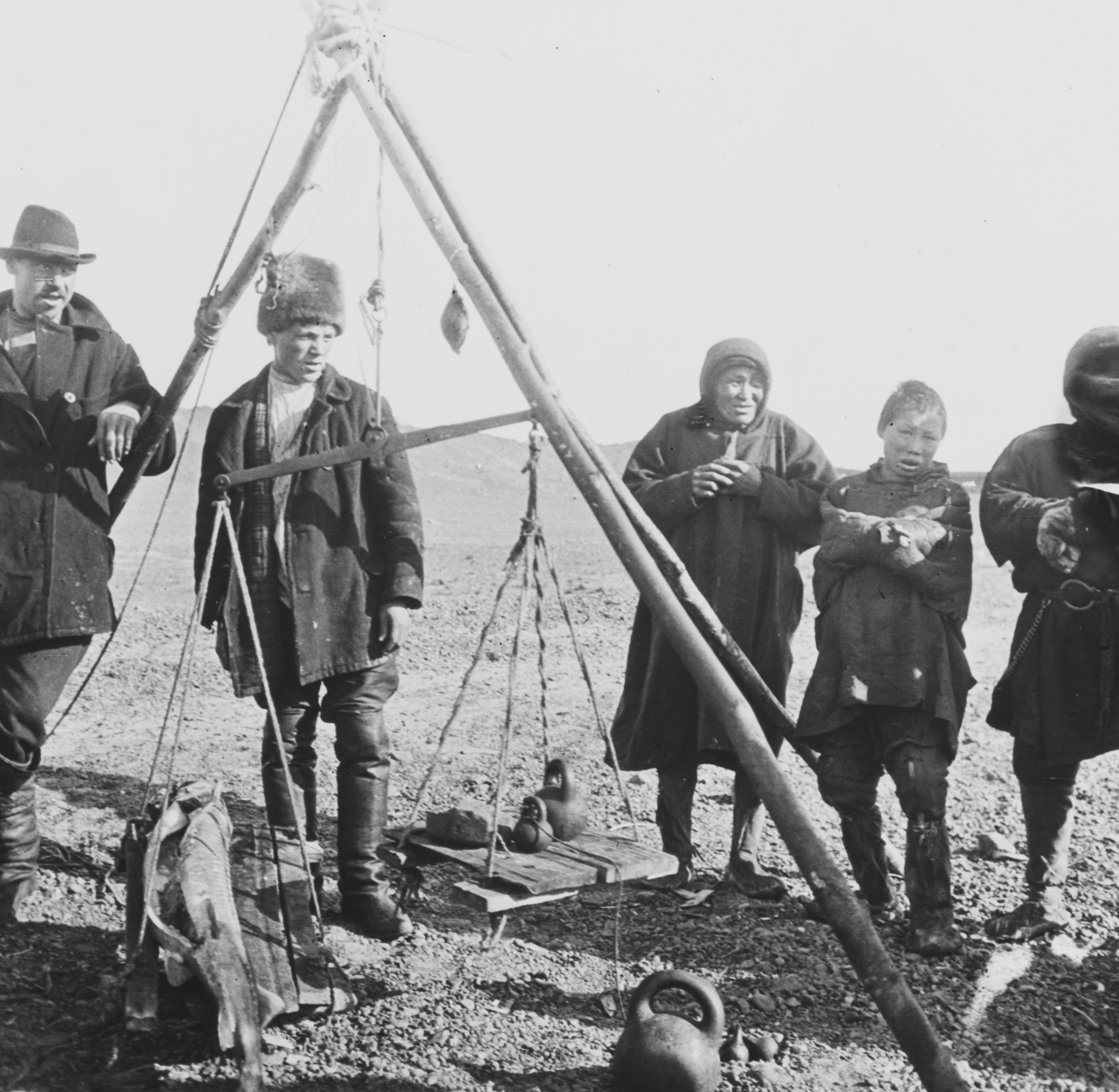
- Enets people trading fish near Yeniseisk, 1913

Total population
- c. 260

Regions with significant populations
- Russia: Krasnoyarsk Krai: 227 (2010)
- Ukraine: 26 (2001)

Languages
- Enets

Related ethnic groups
- Other Samoyedic peoples

The Enets (Russian: энцы, entsy; singular: энец, enets; also known as Yenetses, Entsy, Entsi, Yenisei or Yenisei Samoyeds) are a Samoyedic ethnic group who live on the east bank, near the mouth, of the Yenisei River. Historically they were nomadic people. As of 2002, most Enets lived in the village of Potapovo in Krasnoyarsk Krai in western Siberia near the Arctic Circle. According to the 2010 Census, there are 227 Enets in Russia. In Ukraine, there were 26 Entsi in 2001, of whom 18 were capable of speaking the Enets language.

The Enets language is a Samoyedic language, formerly known as Yenisei Samoyedic (not to be confused with the Yeniseian language family, which is completely unrelated). Older generation still speaks their language, but education is in Russian and very little of Enets language is taught and the language is almost unused in everyday life.

== Genetics ==
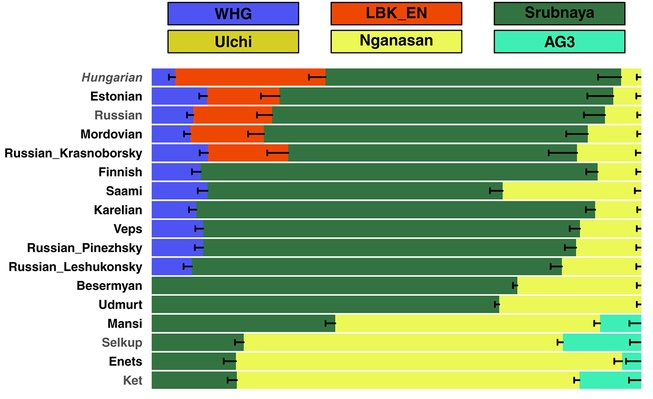
Estimated ancestry components among selected Eurasian populations. The yellow component represents Neo-Siberian ancestry (represented by Nganasans).

In a 2002 study, eight of the nine Enets samples belonged to the Y-DNA haplogroup N, which is typical among Uralic peoples. Seven of them had its subclade N1b-P43 and one belonged to the subclade N1c. Haplogroup R1b was found in one sample.

== See also ==
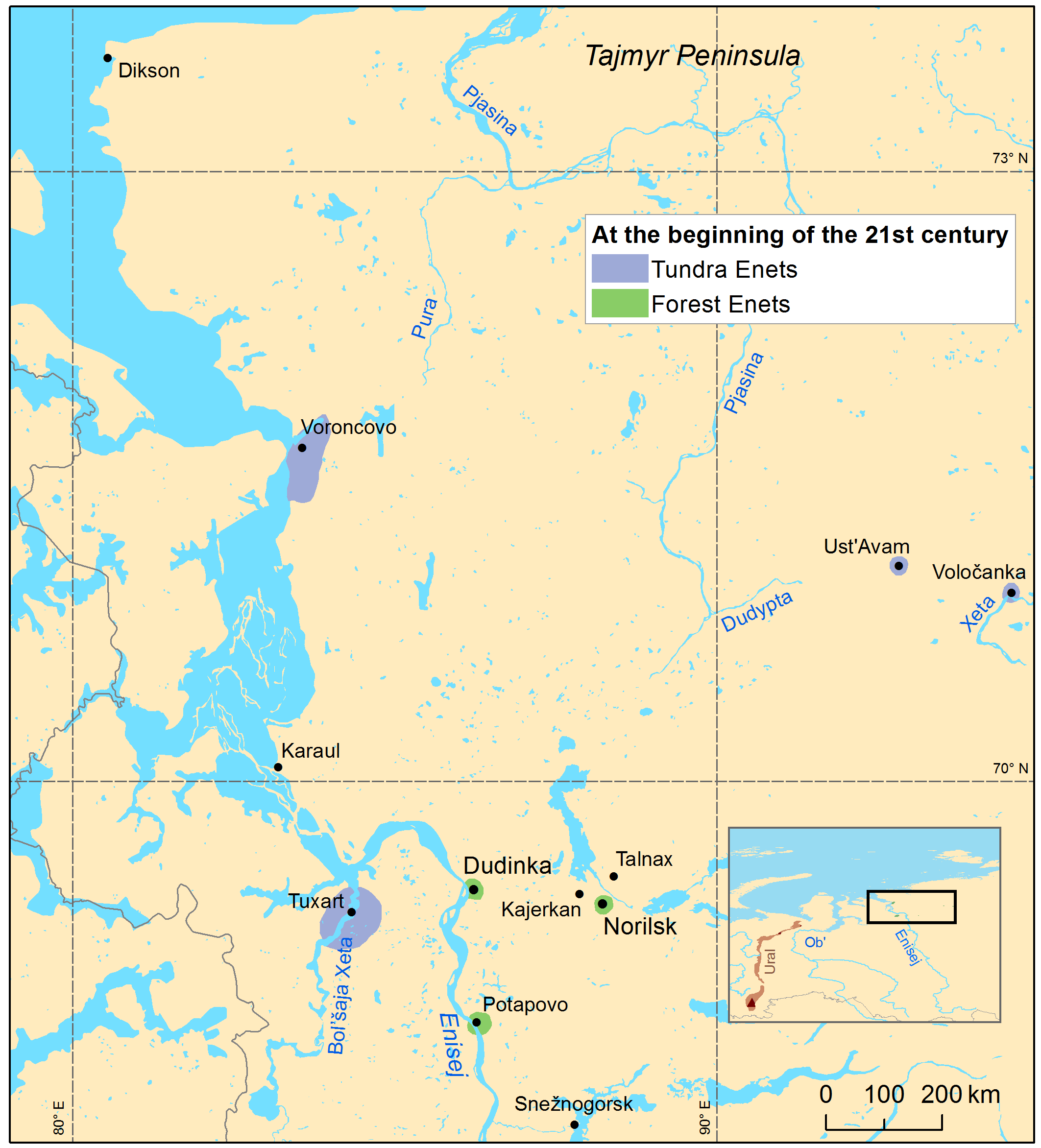
Distribution of Enets, early 21st century

- List of indigenous peoples of Russia
