= Lyamin (river) =

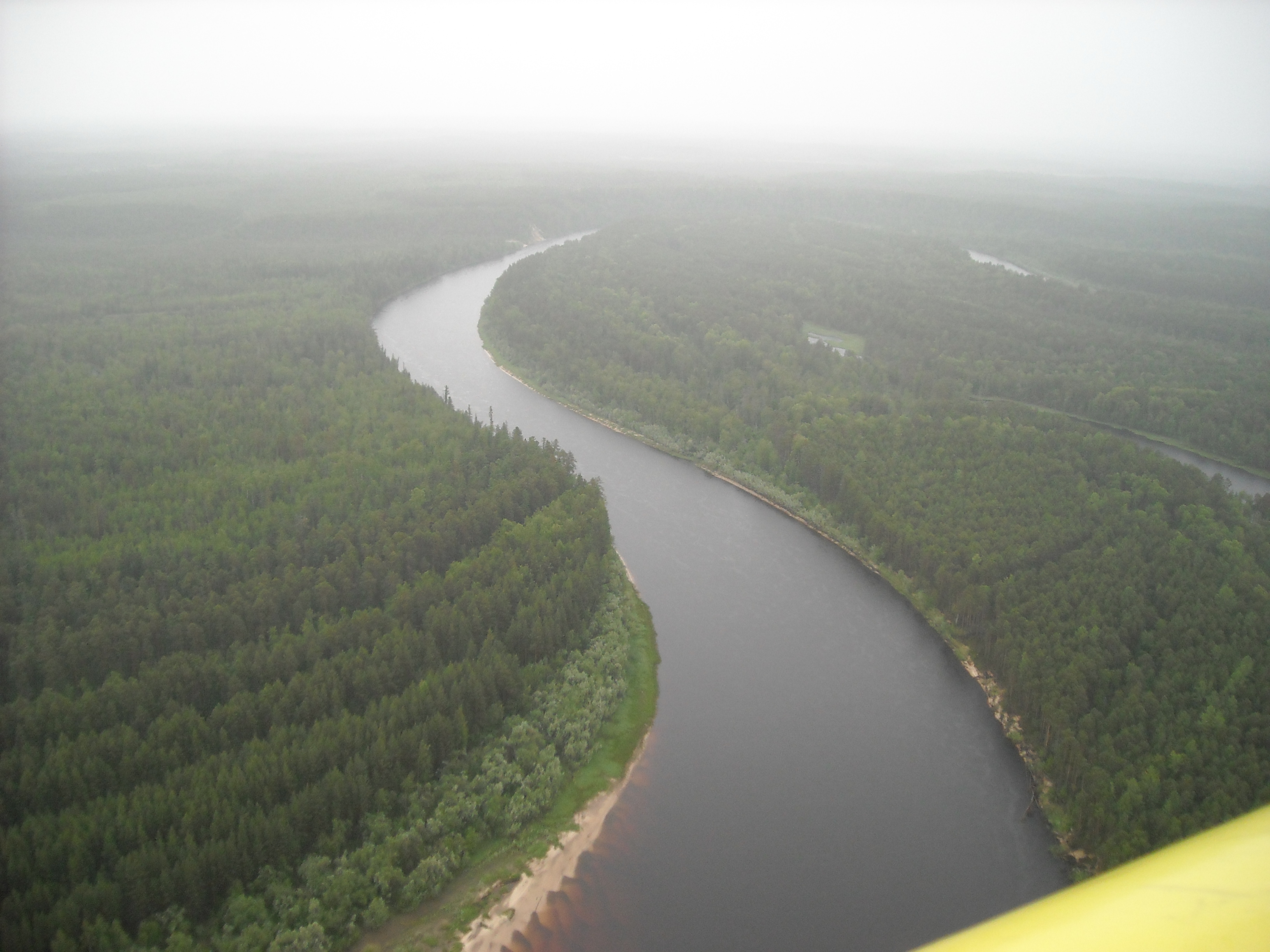

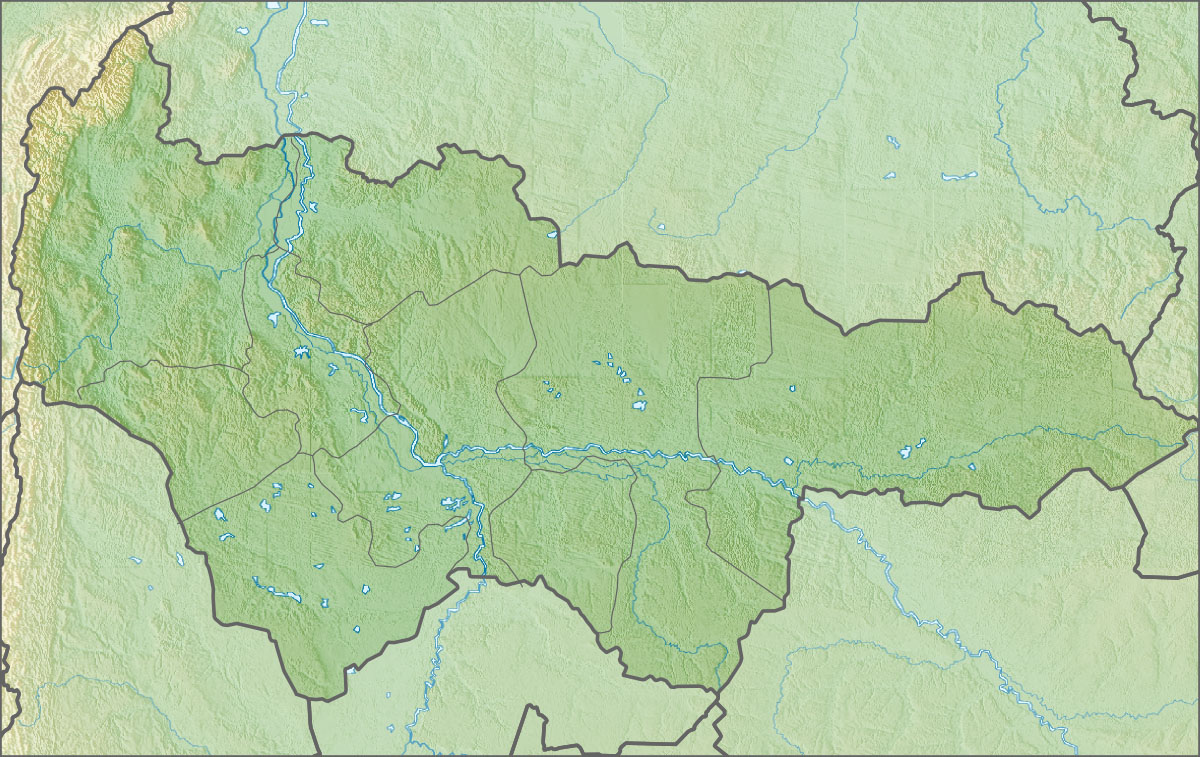
- Mouth location in Khanty-Mansi Autonomous Okrug, Russia

Location
- Country: Russia

Physical characteristics
- Source: Siberian Uvaly
  - coordinates: 62°08′28″N 70°20′46″E
- Mouth: Ob
  - coordinates: 61.2777°N 71.7975°E
- Length: 281 km (175 mi)
- Basin size: 15,900 km^{2} (6,100 sq mi)

Basin features
- Progression: Ob→ Kara Sea

The Lyamin (Russian: Лямин) is a river in Khanty-Mansi Autonomous Okrug, Russia, a right tributary of the Ob. It is 281 kilometres (175 mi) long, and has a drainage basin of 15,900 square kilometres (6,100 sq mi).
