= Tundra Nenets language =

Samoyedic language

Tundra Nenets
- Nenec, Nenetsy, Nentse, Yurak, Yurak Samoyed
- ненэця' вада nenécja' vada
- Pronunciation: [nʲenet͡sʲɑʔ wɑdɑ]
- Native to: Northern Russia
- Ethnicity: Nenets
- Native speakers: 21,900 (2010)
- Language family: Uralic: Samoyedic; (core); Enets–Nenets; Nenets; Tundra Nenets
- Writing system: Cyrillic

Language codes
- ISO 639-3: –
- Glottolog: nene1249
- ELP: Tundra Nenets
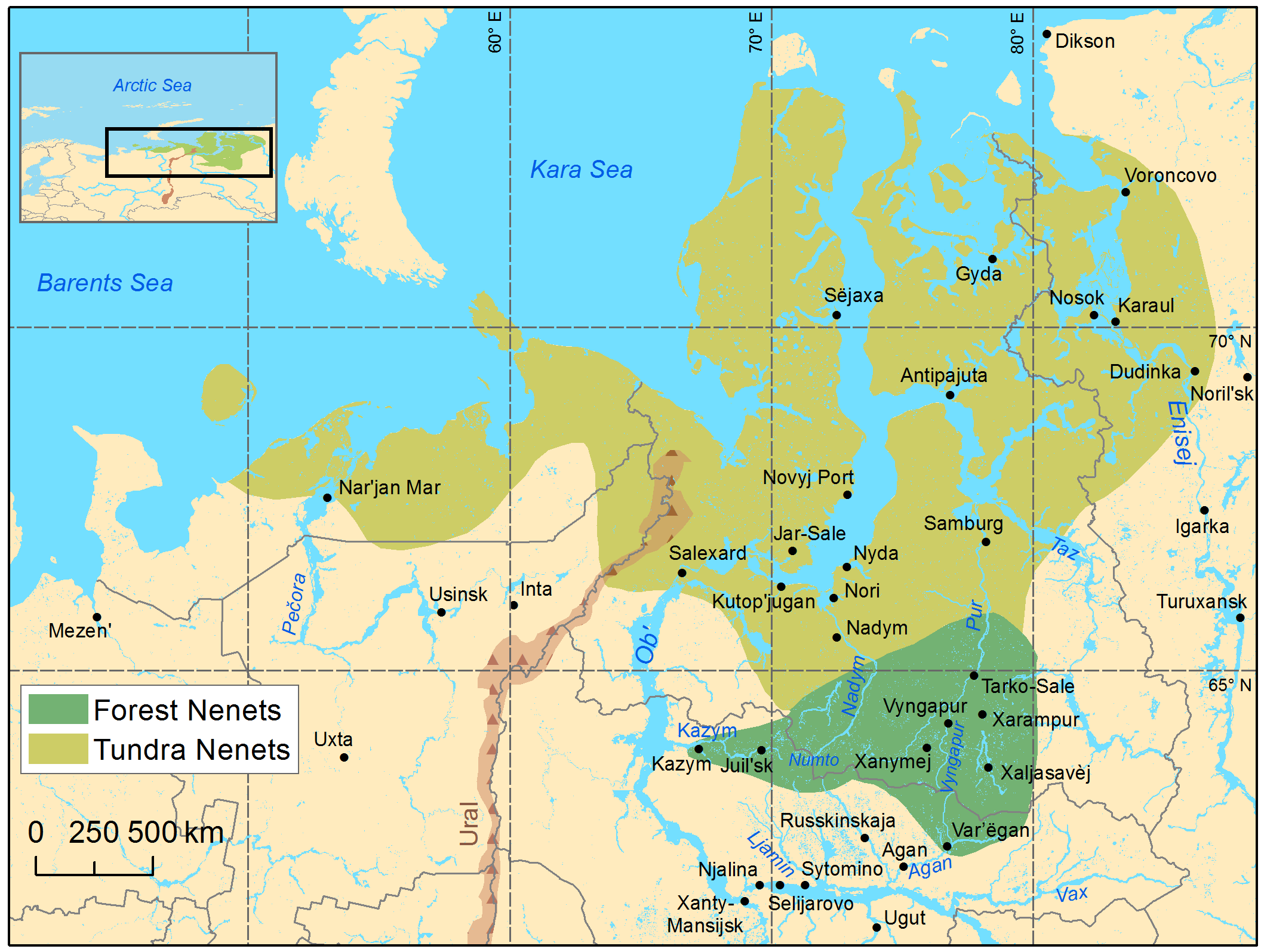
- Distribution of Nenets languages in the 21st century.

- Tundra Nenets is classified as Definitely Endangered by the UNESCO Atlas of the World's Languages in Danger

Tundra Nenets (endonym: ненэця' вада, nenécja' vada, Nenets pronunciation: [nʲenet͡sʲɑʔ wɑdɑ]) is a Uralic language spoken in European Russia and North-Western Siberia. It is the largest and best-preserved language in the Samoyedic group.

Tundra Nenets is closely related to the Nganasan and Enets language, and more distantly to Selkup. Tundra Nenets and its sister language, Forest Nenets, are sometimes considered dialects of a single Nenets language, though there is low mutual intelligibility between the two. In spite of the large area in which Tundra Nenets is spoken, the language is very uniform with few dialectal differences.

Geographically, the Tundra Nenets territory spans the Nenets District of the Arkhangelsk Province, as well as parts of the Komi Republic, the Yamal-Nenets District in the Tyumen Province, and the Ust-Yeniseisk region of the Taimyr District in the Krasnoyarsk Region. This territory has been in constant growth over the past millennium, as Tundra Nenets settlers moved further east and engaged with other groups of Enets.

A 2010 census reported 44,640 Nenets, 49% of whom were speakers of the Nenets language. However, while the population of Nenets has been growing in the past few decades, the language itself has been in a decline, as many children are now educated in Russian-language schools and many other ethnic groups have begun settling in Tundra Nenets territories. The language is classified as 6b (Threatened), indicating that it is still spoken by all age generations, but the number of speakers is decreasing.

Tundra Nenets is spoken primarily within family circles and in traditional economic activities, such as hunting and reindeer herding. The language has no official status within the Russian Federation. In the mid-1930s, an orthography based on the Cyrillic script was developed, which is taught in local schools. However, many Tundra Nenets speakers are primarily literate in Russian. Nonetheless, there is a small amount of Tundra Nenets literature, and radio and television broadcasts are available in the language.

== Phonology ==
The syllable structure of Tundra Nenets is generally CV(C), and syllables with initial, medial or final consonant clusters of more than two consonants do not occur. Words normally begin with a consonant, except in western dialects of the language, mostly due to the loss of /ŋ/, so the standard Tundra Nenets word ŋarka ('big') is found as arka in western varieties.

=== Consonants ===
The number of consonant phonemes in Tundra Nenets is 27. All labial and coronal consonants other than the semivowels /w/ and /j/ have plain and palatalized counterparts.

Consonant inventory of Tundra Nenets
		Bilabial		Coronal		Velar	Glottal
		Plain	Pala.	Plain	Pala.	Velar	Glottal
Nasal		m	mʲ	n	nʲ	ŋ	
Plosive	Voiceless	p	pʲ	t	tʲ	k	ʔ
Plosive	Voiced	b	bʲ	d	dʲ		ʔ
Affricate				ts	tsʲ		
Fricative				s	sʲ	x	
Approximant	Semivowel	w (Note: Eastern dialects realize this as the pure bilabial [β].)			j	w	
Approximant	Lateral			l	lʲ		
Trill				r (Note: The trill [r] may be uvular [ʀ] or a uvular fricative [ʁ] for some speakers.)	rʲ		

All consonants can be found word-internally between vowels, but their occurrence in other positions is strongly limited.

- Only the 16 consonants shown on darker gray background may occur word-initially.
- Syllable-finally, most consonant contrasts are not found, and only six consonants occur: /b/, /ʔ/, /m/, /n ~ ŋ/, /l/, /r/.

==== Sandhi ====
Tundra Nenets has a phonological process of sandhi: the simplification of consonant clusters, both within words (such as in inflection) and between words. This allows considering some of the consonant phonemes secondarily derived from underlying consonant clusters.

- Fortition of fricatives: when preceded by a consonant, the fricatives /s/, /sʲ/, /x/ become the affricates / stops /ts/, /tsʲ/, /k/ respectively.
- A syllable-final glottal stop /ʔ/ is lost before any obstruent consonants.
- A word-final non-labial nasal /n/ is lost when followed by a sonorant, and becomes a glottal stop utterance finally. Within a word, the cluster /nj/ may occur.

As the citation form of a noun is the bare stem, a word ending in a glottal stop in isolation can thus underlyingly end either in a plain glottal stop or in a nasal. The latter is sometimes called a "nasalizable glottal stop", and is in the orthography of the language written differently from the former.

=== Vowels ===
The number of vowel phonemes in Tundra Nenets is 10, and they have 17 distinct allophones governed by palatality, which dominates whole sequences of vowels and consonants. Vowel frontness is not segmentally contrastive.

Monophthongs are present in the chart below. Phonemes are marked in bold, with their palatal (on the left) and non-palatal (on the right) allophones marked underneath using the International Phonetic Alphabet.

		Unrounded	Rounded
Close	Long	**/iː/** í [(ʲ)iː], [ɨː]	**/uː/** ú [(ʲ)ʉː], [uː]
Close	Short	**/i/** i [(ʲ)i], [ɨ]	**/u/** u [(ʲ)ʉ], [u]
Mid	Tense	**/e/ e** [(ʲ)eː], [ɤː]	**/o/ o** [(ʲ)ɵː], [oː]
Mid	Lax	**/ə/** ° [ə]	
Open	Tense	**/a/ a** [(ʲ)aː], [ɑː]	
Open	Lax	**/ʌ/** ø [(ʲ)ɐ], [ʌ]	

There is also a vowel ⟨æ⟩, which is interchangeably realized as [æ͡e̘] or [æː]. This and the long close vowels only occur in word-initial syllables.

==== Vowel reduction ====
In much of the literature on Tundra Nenets and its sister dialect, Forest Nenets, a so-called reduced vowel is mentioned. This reduced vowel was thought to have two distinct qualities depending on whether it was found in a stressed or unstressed position. In stressed position it was transcribed as ⟨ø⟩ and represented a reduced variant of an underlying vowel, and in unstressed position it was transcribed as ⟨â⟩ and represented a reduced variant of /a/. Recently, however, it has become clear that the reduced vowels are in fact short vowels, counterparts to their respective long vowels. Today ⟨â⟩ should simply be replaced by ⟨a⟩, while ⟨ø⟩ simply represents a short vowel, although it is not specified which short vowel in this orthography.

=== Syllable structure ===
Tundra Nenets has a (C)V(C) syllable structure, and the minimal word is CV. Thus, there are no word-initial or word-final consonant clusters, nor are there any three-consonant clusters. Moreover, syllables with zero onset typically cannot occur word-initially, but in Western dialects, the word-initial ŋ is lost, giving some vowel-initial words. For example, the Eastern dialect ŋəno 'boat' becomes əno in the Western dialect. Word-internally, zero onset syllables only occur when ə or ° follow another vowel. For example, such vowel clusters can occur when forming the finite stem: me° 'he takes (3SG)' gives meə-s'° 'he took (3SG.PST).'

=== Stress ===
Tundra Nenets displays bisyllabic trochaic feet that are aligned to the left. Primary stress falls on the initial syllable. Secondary stress falls on subsequent odd syllables and on even-position syllables preceding a syllable with °, excluding the final syllable, as illustrated in the following examples:

meŋa-xə-yu-n°
ˈme.ŋaˌxə.ju.nə
take-DU.OBJ-1SG

meŋa-xə-yu-nə-s°
ˈme.ŋaˌxə.ju.nəsə
take-DU.OBJ-1SG-PAST

mé-nake`-x°yu`-n'ə-s'°
take-PROB-DU.OBJ-1SG-PAST

== Orthography ==
The alphabet of Tundra Nenets is based on Cyrillic, with the addition of three letters: Ӈ ӈ, ʼ, and ˮ.

=== Vowels ===
The palatalized and plain vowel allophones are distinguished in the original orthography

phonemic transcription		a	e	o	i	u	æ
Cyrillic	Plain	а	э	о	ы	у	э̇
Cyrillic	Palatalized	я	е	ё	и	ю	

The Cyrillic orthography does not distinguish the reduced vowel from a, nor the long ī and ū from their short counterparts i and u. ǣ is not found in a palatalized environment, and thus does not show up in the chart. The schwa, [ə], has no direct counterpart in the Cyrillic orthography and is in most cases not written. However, it may sometimes appear as ⟨а⟩, ⟨я⟩, ⟨ы⟩, ⟨ӗ⟩ or ⟨ŏ⟩. For example, xad°, ('snowstorm') is written as хад, and nix° ('power') is written as ныхы.

=== Consonants ===
The consonants in the Cyrillic orthography can be seen in the chart below. Note that palatalized consonants are not included.

phonemic transcription	/m/	/p/	/b/	/w/	/n/	/t/	/d/	/ts/	/s/	/j/	/l/	/r/	/ŋ/	/k/	/x/	/ʔ/	/ʔ/
Cyrillic	м	п	б	в	н	т	д	ц	с	й	л	р	ӈ	к	х	ˮ	ʼ

The letter ⟨ˮ⟩ marks a "plain" glottal stop, while ⟨ʼ⟩ marks a glottal stop derived from a word-final n. As in Russian, the consonants are palatalized using the soft sign, ⟨ь⟩. For example, the palatalized consonant m' is represented with ⟨мь⟩ in Cyrillic unless it is followed by a palatalizing vowel, such as ⟨ё⟩, so that m'o is written as ⟨мё⟩.

== Morphology ==
Typical of the Uralic language family, Tundra Nenets has an agglutinative morphological structure with a wide variety of suffixes. There is no prefixation. The two primary word classes are nouns and verbs. Other word classes include adjectives, pronouns, numerals, adverbs, postpositions, conjunctions, particles, and interjections.

A noun can contain up to five morphemes, including the root, a derivational suffix, a possessive suffix, a number suffix, and a case suffix. A verb can contain up to six or seven morphemes, including the root, one or two derivational suffixes, a tense suffix, a mood suffix, a subject agreement suffix, and an object agreement suffix. Although the morphology is predominately agglutinative, there are some suffixes that express multiple meanings, along with periphrastic clausal negation and some auxiliary verbs.

=== Derivational affixes ===
Tundra Nenets contains a few nominal derivational affixes that can be used to denote a cause, express an instrument, or refer to a location of action. For example, the noun xərwa-bco 'wish' can be derived from the verb xərwa- 'to want'. There are also several mixed categories of nouns that have a syntactic distribution of a different word class, yet share other properties with nouns. For example, the proprietive suffix -sawey° can be used to derive nouns with the meaning 'with X, having X', as in yī-sawey° 'intelligent' (from yī 'mind').

Tundra Nenets has two verbal aspectual classes, perfective and imperfective. There are several derivational aspectual suffixes which can change the aspectual class of a verb. For example, imperfectivizing suffixes can be used to express durative, frequentative, multiplicative, and iterative meanings, such as in tola-bə 'to keep counting' (from tola- 'to count'). There are also denominal verbs with the meaning 'to use as X, to have as X', which are formed from the accusative plural stem, such as in səb'i-q' 'to use as a hat' (from səwa 'hat').

=== Inflectional affixes ===
Nouns are inflected for number (singular, dual, plural), case (nominative, accusative, genitive, dative, locative, ablative, prolative), and possessive, which can indicate the person and number of the possessor. For example, the following noun is inflected for similative case and third person plural number.

numke-rəxa-q
star-SIM-3PL
'like stars'

The dual forms are only used in the grammatical cases (nominative, accusative, and genitive). In non-possessive constructions, the dual suffix is -x°h, and -xəyu- in possessive constructions, followed by the possessive affixes.

Dual paradigm for ŋəno 'boat'
	1 Sg		2 Sg
Nom	ŋəno-x°h	ŋəno-xəyu-n°	ŋəno-xəyu-d°
Acc	ŋəno-x°h	ŋəno-xəyu-n°	ŋəno-xəyu-d°
Gen	ŋəno-x°h	ŋəno-xəyu-n°	ŋəno-xəyu-t°

The plural paradigm is as follows:

Plural paradigm
	Plural (non-possesive)	1 Sg Plural (possesive)
Nom	ŋəno-q	ŋənu-n°
Acc	ŋəno	ŋənu-n°
Gen	ŋəno-q	ŋənu-qn°
Dat	ŋəno-x°q	ŋəno-x°q-n°
Loc	ŋəno-xəqna	ŋəno-xəqna-n°
Abl	ŋəno-xət°	ŋəno-xətə-n°
Prol	ŋənu-qməna	ŋənu-qməna-n°

=== Verbs ===
Verbs are inflected for agreement, tense, and mood. Present tense is unmarked, but Tundra Nenets distinguishes inflectionally the past, future, habitual, and future-in-the-past tenses. There are sixteen moods, which include the imperative, hortative, optative, conjunctive, necessitative, interrogative, probabilitative, obligative, potential, and inferential. For example, the verb below is inflected for subjunctive mood, first person singular agreement, and past tense.

ŋod'°q s'it° məneq-yi-dəm-c'°
DP you.ACC see-SUBJ-1SG-PAST
'If only I could see you!'

=== Clitics ===
Clitics undergo the same phonological processes and stress assignment as affixes. They can attach to an affirmative finite verb, a negative auxiliary, or a non-verbal final predicate, and follow any other inflection, as shown with the following exclamative clitic:

pidər° tola-mp'i-n°=n'uq!
you read-DUR-2SG-EXCL
'It turns out you are reading!'

=== Particles ===
Particles are primarily used for discourse. Common particles include yekar°q 'it is unknown', ŋod'°q 'hardly', tǣr'i 'just, very', and məs'iq 'maybe, perhaps.' An example is given below:

yekar°q tūt-bə-ta=w°h
DP come.FUT-COND-3SG-DUB
'It's unlikely that he will come.'

=== Compounding ===
There are some lexical noun-noun compounds in Tundra Nenets. As shown in the following example, the first element in the compound can always be modified and take a number.

xasawa ŋǝcʹeki°-q
man child-PL
'boys'

=== Suppletion ===
A few irregular verbs show suppletion. The most frequent suppletive verbs are xǣ- 'to go, to depart', ŋǣ- 'to be', to- 'to come', ta- 'to bring, to give' and the negative auxiliary nʹi-. Some common suppletive forms for these verbs are given in the table below.

	to go/depart	to be	to come	to bring, give	negative auxiliary
3SG	xəya	ŋa	to°	ta°	nʹī
CONNEG	xanʹ°q	ŋaq (~ŋǣq)	tuq	taq	-
IMPF PART	xǣn(ʹ)a	ŋǣda	tona	tada~tana	nʹinʹa
IMP 2SG	xanʹ°q	ŋaq	tuq	taq	nʹon°
FUT 3SG	xan°tə°	ŋǣŋu	tūtə°	tətə°	-

== Syntax ==
=== Basic word order ===
Tundra Nenets is predominantly a head-final SOV language. Verb finality is the primary constraint on word order. Below are examples of the basic word order for a transitive and intransitive sentence.

məy°mpə-da Wera Maša-m pad°ta°-da
cheerful-IMPF.PART Wera Masha-ACC {draw-3SG > SG.OBJ}
'Cheerful Wera drew Masha.'

Wera-h teda yuxu
Wera-GEN reindeer.3SG get.lost
'Wera's reindeer got lost.'

However, although most simple sentences have SOV order, a more general trend is for the informationally new element to be immediately preverbal and to be preceded by the informationally old element. So, it is possible to have sentences where the direct object precedes the subject, as illustrated below:

s'exari°-m sira toxora°-da
road-ACC snow {cover-3SG > SG.OBJ}
'Snow covered the road.'

=== Possessee + possessor ===
The possessor precedes the thing being possessed.

noxa‐h tǣwa
polar.fox-GEN tail
'polar fox's tail'

=== Adjective (comparative) + standard ===
Comparative adjectives follow their standards, which take the ablative case.

t'uku° pəni° taki° pəne-xəd° səwa(-rka)
This coat that coat-ABL good-COMP
'This coat is better than that one.'

=== Determiner + noun phrase ===
The determiner precedes the noun phrase.

tʹuku° Wera-h ti
this Wera-GEN reindeer
'this reindeer of Wera's'

== Sample text ==
(Article 1 of the Universal Declaration of Human Rights)

Ет хибяри ненэць соямарианта хуркари правада тнява, ӈобой ненээя ниду нись токалба, ӈыбтамба илевату тара.
Et xibjari nenėc' sojamarianta xurkari pravada tnjava, ṇoboj nenėėja nidu nis' tokalba, ṇybtamba ilevatu tara.
All human beings are born free and equal in dignity and rights. They are endowed with reason and conscience and should act towards one another in a spirit of brotherhood.
