= Enets language =

Moribund Samoyedic language spoken by Enets people

Enets
- Онэй база Onei baza
- Native to: Russia
- Region: Krasnoyarsk Krai, along the lower Yenisei River
- Ethnicity: 260 Enets people (2010 census)
- Native speakers: 69 (2020 census, Russia); 18 (2001, Ukraine)
- Language family: Uralic: Samoyedic; (core); Enets–Nenets; Enets

Language codes
- ISO 639-3: Either: enf – Forest Enets enh – Tundra Enets
- Glottolog: enet1250
- ELP: Forest Enets
- Tundra Enets
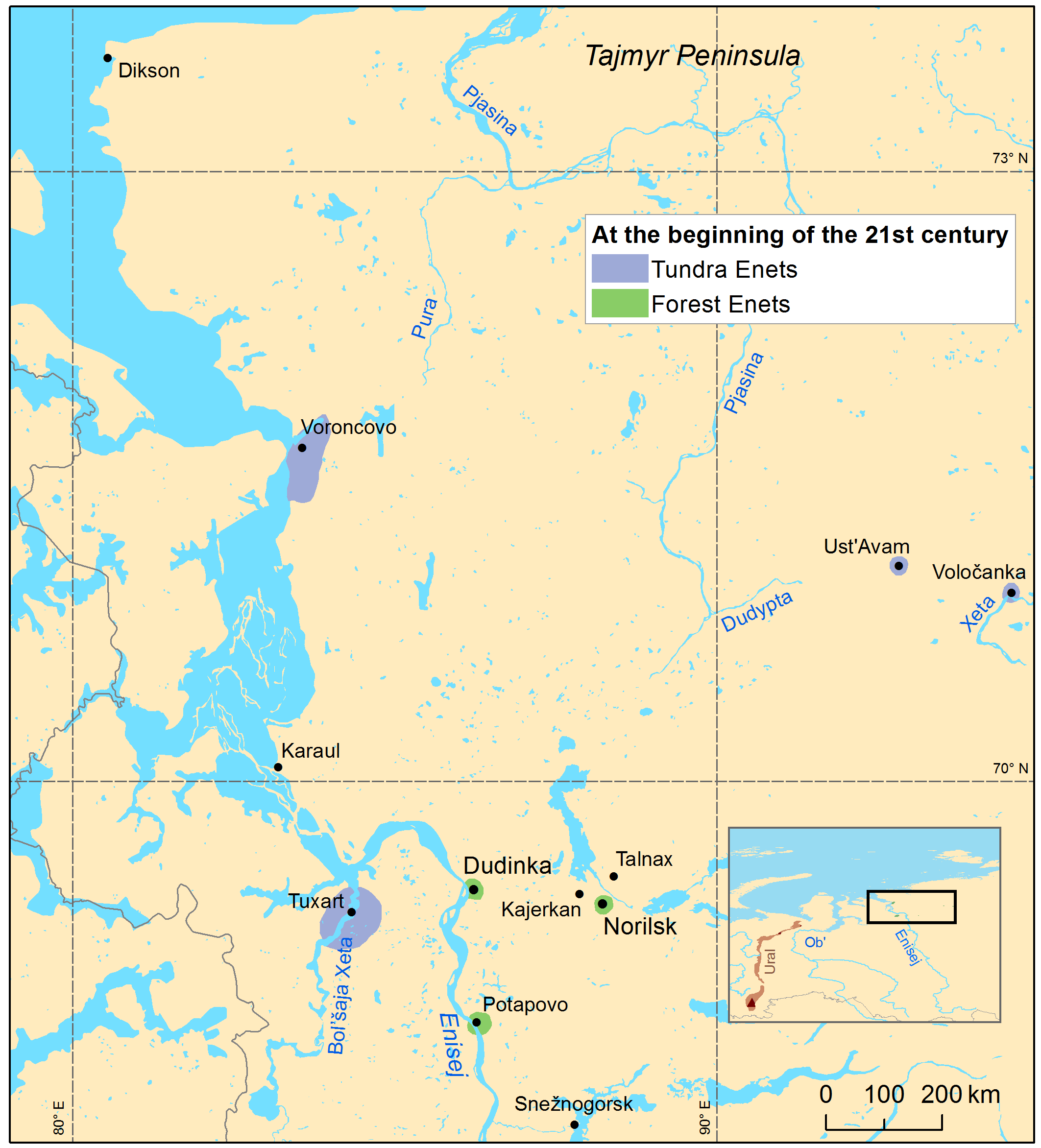
- Current distribution of Enets languages.

- Forest Enets is classified as Critically Endangered by the UNESCO Atlas of the World's Languages in Danger

Enets (Forest Enets: Онэй база) is a Samoyedic language of Northern Siberia spoken on the Lower Yenisei within the boundaries of the Taimyr Municipality District, a subdivision of Krasnoyarsk Krai, Russian Federation. Enets belongs to the Northern branch of the Samoyedic languages, in turn a branch of the Uralic language family.

== Status ==
In 2010 about 40 people claimed to be native Enets speakers, while in 2020, 69 people claimed to speak Enets natively, while 97 people claimed to know Enets in total.

The older generation still speaks their language, but education is in Russian and very little of the Enets language is taught; the language is thus almost unused in everyday life.

== Dialects ==
There are two distinct dialects, Forest Enets (Bai) and Tundra Enets (Madu or Somatu), which may be considered separate languages.

Tundra Enets is the smaller of the two Enets dialects. In the winter of 2006/2007, approximately 35 people spoke it (6 in Dudinka, 20 in Potapovo and 10 in Tukhard, the youngest of whom was born in 1962 and the oldest in 1945). Many of these speakers are trilingual, with competence in Forest Enets, Tundra Nenets and Russian, preferring to speak Tundra Nenets.

The two dialects differ both in phonology and in lexicon. Additional variation was found in early Enets records from the 17th to 19th centuries, though all these varieties can be assigned as either Tundra Enets or Forest Enets.

Phonological differences:

- In some words, Forest Enets /s/ corresponds to Tundra Enets /ɟ/ (from Proto-Samoyedic *ms, *ns, *rs and *rkʲ).
  - Forest mese — Tundra meɟe 'wind' (from *merse < *märkʲä);
  - Forest osa — Tundra uɟa 'meat' (from *ʊnsa < *əmså);
  - Forest sira — Tundra silra 'snow';
  - Forest judado — Tundra judaro 'pike';
  - Forest kadaʔa — Tundra karaʔa 'grandmother';
- In some words, Forest Enets word-initial /na/ corresponds to Tundra Enets /e/ (from Proto-Samoyedic *a- > *ä-).
- Certain vowel + glide sequences of Proto-Samoyedic have different reflexes in Forest Enets and Tundra Enets.
- Forest Enets word-initial /ɟi/ corresponds to Tundra Enets /i/.

Lexical differences:

- Forest eba — Tundra aburi 'head'
- Forest baða — Tundra nau 'word'
- Forest ʃaru — Tundra oma 'tobacco'
- Forest abbua — Tundra miʔ 'what'

== Phonology ==
The following phoneme inventories are combined from all of the different dialects of the Enets languages. Uralicist transcription, often used in literature on Enets, is given below the IPA transcription.

=== Vowels ===
	Front	Central	Back
High	i i	ɨ i̮	u u
Mid	e, ɛ ḙ, e	ə e̮ or ə̑	o, ɔ o̭, o
Low		ɑ a	

Vowel length is indicated by a macron, e.g. ē [eː].

=== Consonants ===
		Labial		Dental		Palatal		Velar	Glottal
		plain	pal.	plain	pal.	plain	pal.	Velar	Glottal
Nasal		m m	mʲ ḿ	n n	nʲ ń			ŋ η	
Stop/ Affricate	voiceless	p p	pʲ ṕ	t t	tʲ ť or tʹ	t͡ʃ č	t͡ʃʲ č́ or čʹ	k k	ʔ ˀ or ʼ
Stop/ Affricate	voiced	b b	bʲ b́ or bʹ	d d	dʲ ď or dʹ			g g	
Fricative	plain			ð δ				x χ	h h
Fricative	sibilant			s s	sʲ ś	ʃ š	ʃʲ š́ or šʹ		
Trill				r r	rʲ ŕ				
Approximant		w w		l l	lʲ ľ or lʹ	j j			

- There is partial or complete vowel reduction in the middle and at the end of a word
- Consonants preceding i and e become palatalized

=== Stress ===
The type of stress in Enets is quantitative. Stressed vowels are pronounced relatively longer than unstressed vowels. Based on the available data, the stress is not (as a rule) used as a feature for distinguishing the meaning. The stress in a word usually falls on the first vowel. The primary stress usually falls on the first syllable and is accompanied by a secondary stress, which falls on the third and the fifth syllable. Sometimes the stress distinguishes the meaning, e.g. in mo·di ('I') vs. modi· ('shoulder'). (The primary stress is marked by ·).

== Orthography ==
Enets is written using the Cyrillic alphabet with several additional letters that are not used in the Russian alphabet.

The written form of the Enets language was created during the 1980s and has been used to produce a number of books. During the 1990s there was a local newspaper with insert in local languages (including Enets language), Советский Таймыр (Soviet Taimyr, modern simple Taymyr) published and brief Enets broadcasts on local radio, which shut down in 2003, served as supplements for speakers.

In 2019, the Enets alphabet was reformed, and in April 2020, the Enets primer was published in a new version of the alphabet. The alphabet contains the following letters:

А а	Б б	В в	Г г	Д д	Е е	Ԑ ԑ	Ё ё
Ж ж	З з	И и	Й й	К к	Л л	М м	Н н
Ӊ ӊ	О о	О̂ о̂	П п	Р р	С с	Т т	У у
Ф ф	Х х	Ц ц	Ч ч	Ш ш	Щ щ	ъ	Ы ы
ь	Э э	Ю ю	Я я	ˮ

== Grammar ==
Enets nouns vary for number, case, and person-number of the possessor. There is also an intriguing nominal case in which 'destinativity' determines the entity is destined for someone. Possessor markers are also used for discourse related purposes, where they are completely devoid of the literal possessive meaning. Enets postpositions are marked for person-number; many postpositions are formed from a small set of relational nouns and case morphology.

=== Morphology ===
The parts of speech in Enets are: nouns, adjectives, numerals, pronouns, verbs, adverbs, postpositions, conjunctions, interjections and connective particles.

The grammatical number is expressed by means of the opposition of the singular, dual and plural forms. There are three declensions, the main (non-possessive), possessive and desiderative declensions, and seven cases in Enets: the nominative, genitive, accusative, lative, locative, ablative and prolative case. The meaning of those cases is expressed by means of suffixes added to nouns, adjectives, pronouns and substantivized verbs. In their fixed forms they also belong to adverbs and postpositions. The possession is expressed by means of the genitive case or possessive suffixes.

Local orientation is based on the three-member distribution: the suffixes of local cases of nouns, adverbs and postpositions are divided among the lative (to where?), locative (where?) and ablative (from where?). The prolative case (along what? or through what?) expresses an additional fourth local characteristic.

The verbal negation is expressed by the combination of the main verb with a preceding auxiliary negative verb. The auxiliary verb is conjugated according to general rules, but the main verb is in a special inconjugated negative form. There are also some verbs of absence - non-possessiveness. Six moods are contrasted in the Enets language: indicative, conjunctive, imperative, optative, quotative and interrogative. There are three tenses: aorist, preterite and future.

The category of person with nouns is expressed by means of possessive suffixes, differing in all three numbers of all three persons and used in nouns, pronouns, substantivized verbs, adverbs and postpositions. The category of person with verbs is expressed by means of particular personal suffixes of the verb, differing in all three numbers of all three persons.

There are three conjugations in Enets: subjective, objective and reflexive. These conjugations differ from each other by personal suffixes. Additionally, the objective conjugation uses numerical suffixes, referring to all three numbers of the object. In the case of the reflexive conjugation, the person of the subject and object is the same and a separate suffix indicates reflexivity.

==== Nouns ====
Depending on the final sounds of the word stem, nouns can be divided into two groups:

1. nouns with a final sound other than a laryngal plosive stop, e.g. dʲuda 'horse'
2. nouns with a final laryngal plosive stop, e.g. tauʔ 'Nganasan'

Either group uses variants of suffixes with a different initial sound (e.g. Loc dʲuda-han, tau-kon).

There are seven cases in Enets: the nominative, genitive, accusative, lative, locative, ablative and prolative case. The case suffixes are combined with numeral markers, often in a fairly complex manner.

	Singular	Plural
Nominative	-	-ʔ
Genitive	-ʔ	-ʔ
Accusative	-	-ʔ
Lative	-d/-t	-hɨð/-gɨð/-kɨð
Locative	-hVn/-gon/-kon	-hɨn/-gɨn/-kɨn
Ablative	-hVð/-gɨð/-kɨð	-hɨt/-gɨt/-kɨt
Prolative	-on/-mon	-ɨn/-on

The dual case forms are produced on the basis of an uninflected dual form with the suffix -hɨʔ/-gɨʔ/-kɨʔ by adding the respective singular case endings of some postpositions (mainly nə-) in local cases.

==== Adjectives ====
There are a number of adjectives that have no specific suffixes, e.g. utik 'bad', sojδa 'good', lodo 'low' and piδe 'high'.

Alongside these, there are various suffixal adjectives, e.g. buse̮-saj ne̮ 'a married woman', bite-δa 'waterless', uδa-šiδa 'handless', mȯga-he 'belonging to the forest', same-raha 'wolf-like', narδe-de̮ 'red', polδe-de̮ 'black'.

The adjective does not agree with its head either in number or case, e.g. agga koja 'big sterlet', agga koja-hone (locative), agga koja-hi̮t (plural ablative). As an exception, we can refer to the use of the adjective instead of an elliptical noun and as a predicate in the nominal conjugation.

To strengthen a possessive connection, sometimes a respective possessive suffix may be added to the head of an attribute, e.g. keδerʔ koba-δa ŋul'ʔ mujuʔ 'the wild reindeer skin is very strong' ("its-skin of-the-wild-reindeer...").

The comparative degree is formed by means of an adjective in the positive degree (in the nominative form) with the word to be compared in the ablative form.

==== Verbs ====
The verbs in Enets can be distributed into two groups in principally the same manner as the noun depending on the final sounds of the word stem. Either group uses the variants of suffixes with different initial sounds.

Seven moods are contrasted: indicative, conjunctive, imperative, optative, quotative and interrogative. There are three tenses: aorist, preterite and future. (These tenses exist practically only in the indicative mood.) The verb has three conjugations: subjective, objective and reflexive. These conjugations differ from each other by personal suffixes. In addition to this the objective conjugation uses numerical suffixes, referring to all three numbers of the object. In the case of reflexive conjugation a separate suffix indicates reflexivity.

===== Finite forms =====
The aorist is either unmarked or with the marker -ŋV-/-V-. The temporal meaning of the aorist depends on the aspect of the verb. A prolonged or recurrent action should be understood as taking place in the present, a short-time or single action as having taken place in the past, whereas the influence of the latter is still felt in the present. A distinctly past action is expressed by the preterite with the marker -ś/-š/-d'/-t'/-č, whereas the marker is placed after personal suffixes. The future action is expressed by the future marker -d-/-dV-/-t-/-tV- before personal suffixes.

The objective conjugation uses one type of personal suffixes when the object is in the singular and another type of them with the object in the dual or the plural. In the case of the dual object the dual marker -hu-/-gu-/-ku- precedes the dual personal suffixes of the second type, whereas in the case of the plural object, the rise of the stem vowel can be observed. The marker of the reflexive mood is -i-, which is standing before personal suffixes.

=== Syntax ===
The syntax of Enets is typical for the family and the area. The Enets language follows Subject-object-verb, head marking in the noun phrase, both head and dependent marking within the clause, non-finite verbal forms used for clause combining. Consequently, the finite verb form (the predicate) is always at the end of a sentence. The negative auxiliary verb immediately precedes the main verb. The object of a sentence always keeps to the word it belongs to.

== Vocabulary ==
=== Numerals ===
Numeral	Cardinal	Ordinal
1	ŋōʔ	orðede̮
2	siðe	ne̮kujde̮
3	nehuʔ	ne̮hode̮
4	teto	tetode̮
5	sobboreggo	sobode̮
6	mottuʔ	motode̮
7	seʔo	se̮ʔode̮
8	sidiʔeto	siðetode̮
9	nēsā	ne̮satode̮
10	biwʔ	biwde̮
11	ŋoʔbodade	
12	side bodade	
13	nehuʔ bodade	
14	teto bodade	
20	sidiuʔ	
21	sidiuʔ ŋōʔ	
30	nehibiʔ	
40	tetujʔ	
50	sobboreggujʔ	
60	motujʔ	
70	seʔujʔ	
80	siðetujʔ	
90	nēsauʔ	
100	juʔ	dʲurde̮

Collective numerals are formed combining a separate word namely a form e̮ʃ of the auxiliary verb 'to be' with cardinal numerals, e.g. siðe e̮ʃ 'we two, the two of us'.

Distributive numerals are postpositional constructions of cardinals, combined with the postposition loð, e.g. siðeʔ loð 'by (in) twos'.

Iteratives are the plural forms of cardinals, e.g. ŋobuʔ 'one time, once'.

Fractional numerals are cardinals that are combined with the word boʔ 'a half', e.g. nehuʔ boʔ 'one-third'.

Temporal numerals are formed from cardinals by means of the suffix -ʔ, e.g. orðede̮ʔ 'the first time'.

=== Pronouns ===
==== Personal pronouns ====
Two-member constructions are used to decline personal pronouns. The second member of these constructions is either an independent word stem si- or a postpositional stem no-. The first member may be absent.

Case	Singular	Dual	Plural
Nominative	modi, mod' 'I'	modiniʔ 'we two'	modinaʔ 'we'
Genitive	mod' siń	modińʔ siδińʔ	modinaʔ siδnaʔ
Accusative	mod' siʔ	modińʔ siδińʔ	modinaʔ siδnaʔ
Lative	mod' noń	modińʔ nońʔ	modinaʔ nonaʔ
Locative	mod' none̮ń	modińʔ none̮ńʔ	modinaʔ nonnaʔ
Ablative	mod' noδoń	modińʔ noδońʔ	modinaʔ noδnaʔ
Prolative	mod' noone̮ń	modińʔ noone̮ńʔ	modinaʔ noone̮naʔ

Case	Singular	Dual	Plural
Nominative	ū 'you'	ūdiʔ 'you two'	ūdaʔ 'you'
Genitive	ū sit	ūdiʔ siδtiʔ	ūdaʔ siδtaʔ
Accusative	ū sit	ūdiʔ siδδiʔ	ūdaʔ siδδaʔ
Lative	ū nod	ūdiʔ nodiʔ	ūdaʔ nodaʔ
Locative	ū none̮d	ūdiʔ nondiʔ	ūdaʔ nondaʔ
Ablative	ū noδod	ūdiʔ noδdiʔ	ūdaʔ noδdaʔ
Prolative	ū noone̮d	ūdiʔ noone̮diʔ	ūdaʔ noone̮daʔ

Case	Singular	Dual	Plural
Nominative	bu 'he/she'	budiʔ 'they two'	buduʔ 'they'
Genitive	bu sita	budiʔ sitiʔ	buduʔ siδtuʔ
Accusative	bu sita	budiʔ siδδiʔ	buduʔ siδδuʔ
Lative	bu noda	budiʔ nodiʔ	buduʔ noduʔ
Locative	bu nonda	budiʔ nondiʔ	buduʔ nonduʔ
Ablative	bu noδda	budiʔ noδdiʔ	buduʔ noδduʔ
Prolative	bu noone̮da	budiʔ noone̮diʔ	buduʔ noone̮duʔ

==== Other pronouns ====
Reflexive pronouns are pairs of words whose first component consists of personal pronouns, the second is a separate word stem ker-, combined with their respective possessive suffixes, e.g. mod' keriń 'I myself', ū kerit 'you yourself', bu kerta 'she herself/he himself' or modiń keriń 'we two ourselves'.

Interrogative pronouns are kurse̮ 'which?', sēa 'who?' (used only for humans) and obu 'what?' (used for animals and lifeless objects).

Negative pronouns are formed from interrogative pronouns by adding the suffix -hȯru, e.g. obuhȯru.

== Bibliography ==
- Künnap, Ago (1999). Enets. München: Lincom Europa.
- Haig, G. L., Nau, N., Schnell, S., & Wegener, C. (2011). Achievements and Perspectives. Documenting Endangered Languages, 119-150. doi:10.1515/9783110260021.vii
- Khanina, O. (2018). Documenting a language with phonemic and phonetic variation: the case of Enets. Language Documentation & Conservation 12. 430-460. http://hdl.handle.net/10125/24772
- Khanina, O., & Shluinsky, A. (2008). Finites structures in Forest Enets subordination: A case study of language change under strong Russian influence. Subordination and Coordination Strategies in North Asian Languages Current Issues in Linguistic Theory, 63-75. doi:10.1075/cilt.300.07kha
- Khanina, O., & Shluinsky, A. (2013). Choice of case in cross-reference markers: Forest Enets non-finite forms. Finnisch-Ugrische Mitteilungen Band, 37, 32-44. Retrieved from http://iling-ran.ru/Shluinsky/ashl/ChoiceOfCase_2013.pdf
- Khanina, Olesya; Shluinsky, Andrey (2014). "A rare type of benefactive construction: Evidence from Enets". Linguistics. 52 (6): 1391–1431. doi:10.1515/ling-2014-0025. S2CID 199575745.
- Mikola T.: Morphologisches Wörterbuch des Enzischen. Szeged, 1995 (= Studia Uralo-Altaica 36)
- Siegl, F. (2012). More on Possible Forest Enets – Ket Contacts. Eesti ja Soome-Ugri Keeleteaduse Ajakiri, 3(1), 327-341. doi:10.12697/jeful.2015.6.3.00
- Siegl, F. (2012). Yes/no questions and the interrogative mood in Forest Enets . Per Urales ad Orientem. Iter polyphonicum multilingue, 399-408. Retrieved from http://www.sgr.fi/sust/sust264/sust264_siegl.pdf
- Siegl, Florian (2013). Materials on Forest Enets, an Indigenous Language of Northern Siberia (PDF). (Mémoires de la Société Finno-Ougrienne, 267). Helsinki: Suomalais-Ugrilaisen Seuran Toimituksia.
- Siegl, F. (2015). Negation in Forest Enets. Negation in Uralic Languages Typological Studies in Language, 43-74. doi:10.1075/tsl.108.02sie
- Vajda, E. J. (2008). Subordination and Coordination Strategies in North Asian Languages. Current Issues in Linguistic Theory, 63-73. doi:10.1075/cilt.300
- Болина, Д. С.: Русско-энецкий разговорник. Санкт-Петербург: Просвещение, 2003, 111p. ISBN 5-09-005269-7
- Сорокина, И. П.; Болина, Д .С.: Энецкий-русско и русско-энецкий словарь. Санкт-Петербург: Просвещение, 2001, 311p. ISBN 5-09-002526-6
- Сорокина, И. П.; Болина, Д .С.: Энецкие тексты. Санкт-Петербург: Наука, 2005, 350 p.. ISBN 5-02-026381-8. Online version Archived 2019-11-18 at the Wayback Machine.
- Сорокина, И. П.; Болина, Д. С.: Энецкий словарь с кратким грамматическим очерком: около 8.000 слов. Санкт-Петербург: Наука 2009, 488p. ISBN 978-5-98187-304-1
- Сорокина, И. П.: Энецкий язык. Санкт-Петербург: Наука 2010, 411p. ISBN 978-5-02-025581-4
