= Nenets languages =

Samoyedic languages spoken in Russia

Nenets
- Yurak
- Geographic distribution: Russia (Nenets Autonomous Okrug, Yamalo-Nenets Autonomous Okrug, Krasnoyarsk Krai, Komi Republic, Murmansk Oblast)
- Ethnicity: 49,787 Nenets (2020 census)
- Native speakers: 38,405 (2020 census)
- Linguistic classification: Uralic: Samoyedic; (core); Enets–Nenets; Nenets
- Subdivisions: Forest Nenets; Tundra Nenets

Language codes
- ISO 639-3: yrk
- Glottolog: nene1251
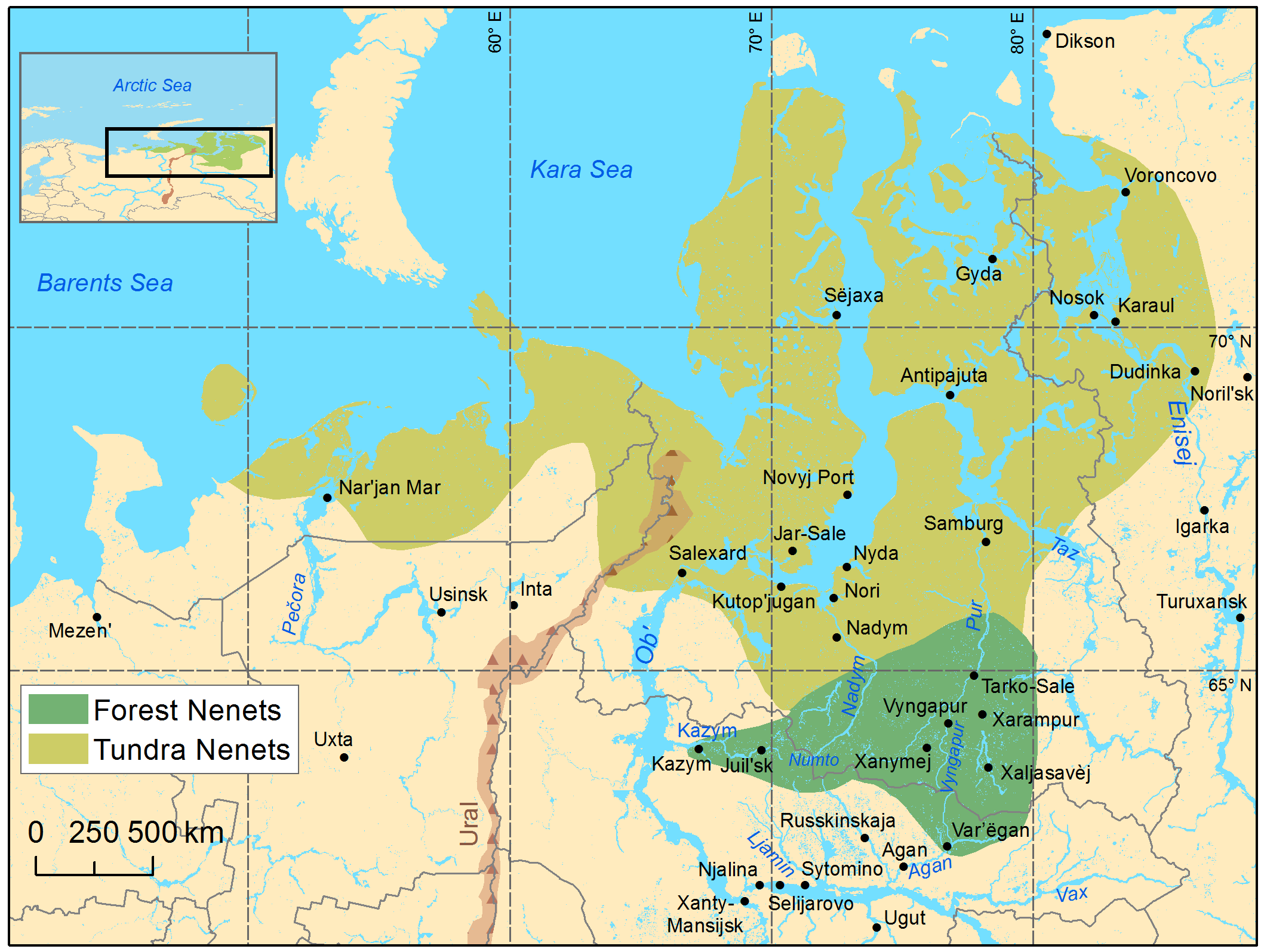
- Distribution of Nenets languages in the 21st century.

Nenets (Nenets: ненэцяʼ вада, romanized: nyenetsya vada; in former work also Yurak) is a pair of closely related languages spoken in northern Russia by the Nenets people. They are often treated as being two dialects of the same language, but they are very different and mutual intelligibility is low. The languages are Tundra Nenets, which has a higher number of speakers, spoken by some 30,000 to 40,000 people in an area stretching from the Kanin Peninsula to the Yenisei River, and Forest Nenets, spoken by 1,000 to 1,500 people in the area around the Agan, Pur, Lyamin and Nadym rivers.

The Nenets languages are classified in the Uralic language family, making them distantly related to some national languages spoken in Europe – namely Finnish, Estonian, and Hungarian – in addition to other minority languages spoken in Russia. Both of the Nenets languages have been greatly influenced by Russian. Tundra Nenets has, to a lesser degree, been influenced by Komi and Northern Khanty. Forest Nenets has also been influenced by Eastern Khanty. Tundra Nenets is well documented, considering its status as an indigenous and minority language. It has a literary tradition going back to the 1930s, while Forest Nenets was first written during the 1990s and has been little documented.

Apart from the word 'Nenets', only one other Nenets word has entered the English language: 'parka', their traditional long, hooded jacket, made from skins and sometimes fur.

== Common features of Nenets languages ==
Tundra Nenets has 16 moods, most of which reflect different degrees of certainty in what in English might be called indicative statements or different degrees of force in what in English might be called imperative commands. An overarching feature of the Nenets languages is the introduction of systematic palatalization of almost all consonants. This originates from contrasts between different vowel qualities in the Proto-Samoyedic language.

- *Cä, *Ca → *Cʲa, *Ca
- *Ce, *Cë → *Cʲe, *Ce
- *Ci, *Cï → *Cʲi, *Ci
- *Cö, *Co → *Cʲo, *Co
- *Cü, *Cu → *Cʲu, *Cu

The velar consonants *k and *ŋ were additionally shifted to *sʲ and *nʲ when palatalized.

Similar changes have also occurred in the other Samoyedic languages spoken in the tundra zone: Enets, Nganasan and the extinct Yurats.

== Differences between Tundra and Forest Nenets ==
Tundra Nenets generally has remained closer to Proto-Nenets than Forest Nenets, whose phonology has been influenced by eastern Khanty dialects. Changes towards the modern languages include:

- Tundra Nenets:
  - Delabialization of /wʲ/ → /j/
  - Lenition of initial /k/ → /x/
  - Simplification of /ʔk/ → /k/
- Forest Nenets:
  - Initial /s/ → /x/
  - Medial denasalization of /nʲ/ → /j/
  - The change of rhotics to lateral fricatives: /r/, /rʲ/ → /ɬ/, /ɬʲ/
  - Shortening of geminate nasals
  - Breaking of geminate /lː/ → /nɬ/
  - Phonemicization of palatalized velars /kʲ/, /xʲ/, /ŋʲ/ due to vowel changes
  - Raising of non-close vowels preceding a syllable with an original close vowel
  - Loss of vowel distinctions in unstressed syllables
  - Introduction of short/long contrasts for /a/ and /æ/

== See also ==
- Maria Barmich
