= Pankow (surname) =

Pankow or Pankov (Russian: Панков) is a surname of Slavic origin, used mostly in Russia. In Slavic countries it is reserved for males, while the feminine counterpart is Pankowa or Pankova. It is also a habitational name from a Slavic place name derived from the Slavic element pank, penk "swamp" and -ow "place" (German: -au). Notable people with the surname include:

- Alexander Pankov (born 1991), Russian ice hockey player
- Bill Pankow (born 1952), American film editor
- Ekaterina Pankova (born 1990), Russian volleyball player
- Gisela Pankow (1914–1998), French psychoanalyst
- Ivan Pankov (born 2005), Bulgarian footballer
- James Pankow (born 1947), American trombone player and songwriter, founding member of the band Chicago
- John Pankow (born 1954), American actor, brother of James Pankow
- Konstantin Pankov (1910–1942), Soviet painter
- Larisa Pankova (born 1991), Russian road bicycle racer
- Marina Pankova (born 1963), Russian volleyball player
- Natalia Pankova (born 1965), Russian artist
- Nikolay Pankov (born 1965), Russian politician
- Pavel Pankov (born 1995), Russian volleyball player
- Radovan Pankov (footballer) (born 1995), Serbian footballer
- Radovan Pankov (politician) (1946–2024), Serbian politician
- Rudy Pankow (born 1998), American actor
- Sergei Pankov (disambiguation), several people
- Steven Pankow (1908–1993), Mayor of Buffalo, New York
- Vadim Pankov (born 1964), Russian volleyball trainer
- Vasili Pankov (born 1968), Belarusian ice hockey player
- Vladimir Pankov (born 1950), Soviet sprint canoer
- Yevgeni Pankov (born 1983), Russian footballer

== See also ==
- Pankau
