= Nikolay Dosekin =

Russian painter

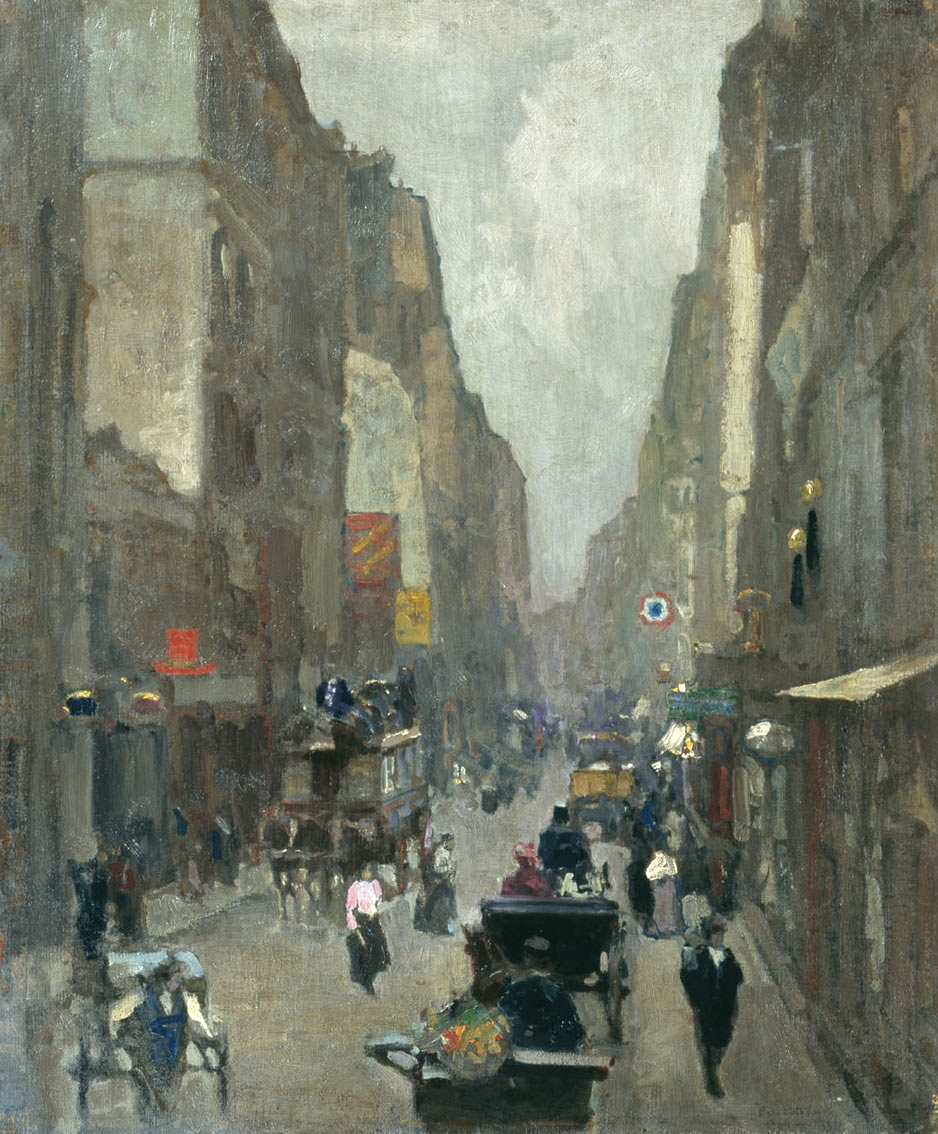
Rue Saint-Denis

Nikolay Vasilievich Dosekin (Russian: Николай Васильевич Досекин; 19 May 1863, Kharkiv – 11 August 1935, Moscow) was a Ukrainian-born Russian-Soviet Impressionist painter; associated with the Peredvizhniki.

== Biography ==
His father, Vasily Dosekin, was an early photographer; known for his portraits of notable people. Two of his four children became artists; Nikolay and his younger brother Sergey (1869–1916).

Nikolay took his first art lessons from the landscape painter, Yegor Schreider. In 1879, he moved to Moscow and took further lessons in the workshops of Alexander Kiselyov. During the 1880s, he travelled throughout Europe; spending time in Venice and Paris. In 1888, he began exhibiting with the Peredvizhniki. He left Russia and settled in Paris in 1896, where he worked with Elizaveta Kruglikova, a painter who is best known for her monotypes.

Although he lived there until 1914, he spent quite a bit of time in Russia and became a full member of the Peredvizhniki in 1900. However, after only a year, he left in protest over the unequal status accorded to young artists. Together with Apollinary Vasnetsov, Sergey Vinogradov and Vasily Pereplyotchikov he established an association for exhibitions which came to be known as "36 Artists", after the peak number of members it once boasted.

From 1901 to 1903 he also exhibited with Mir Iskusstva, then became one of the founders of the "Union of Russian Artists". At the beginning of World War I, he returned to Russia and settled in Moscow. From 1919 to 1921, he was head of the artists' cooperative in Rostov-on-Don and, from 1922 to 1925, worked for the Moscow Handicraft Museum. In 1926, he became a member of the Association of Artists of Revolutionary Russia.

== Gallery ==
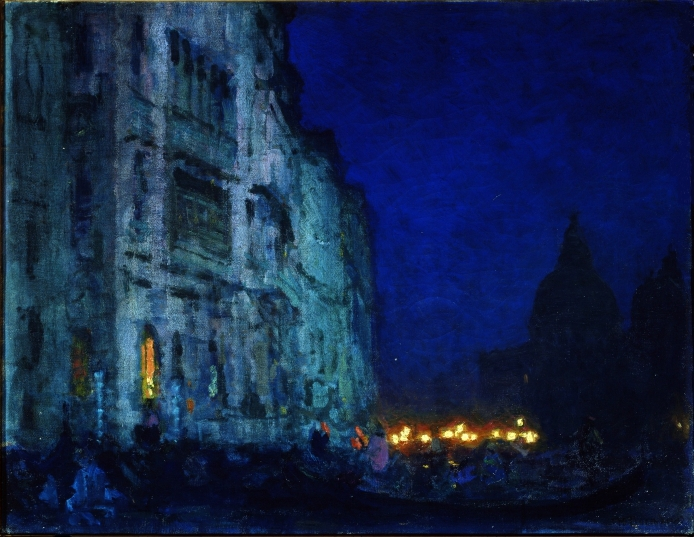
Venetian Nocturne, 1900s

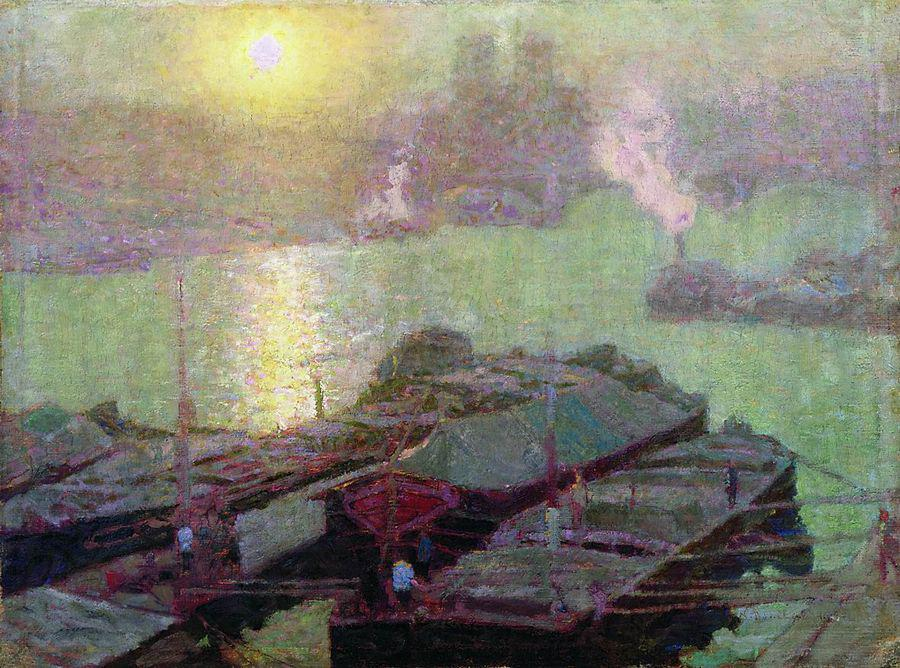
Seine, Paris, 1900

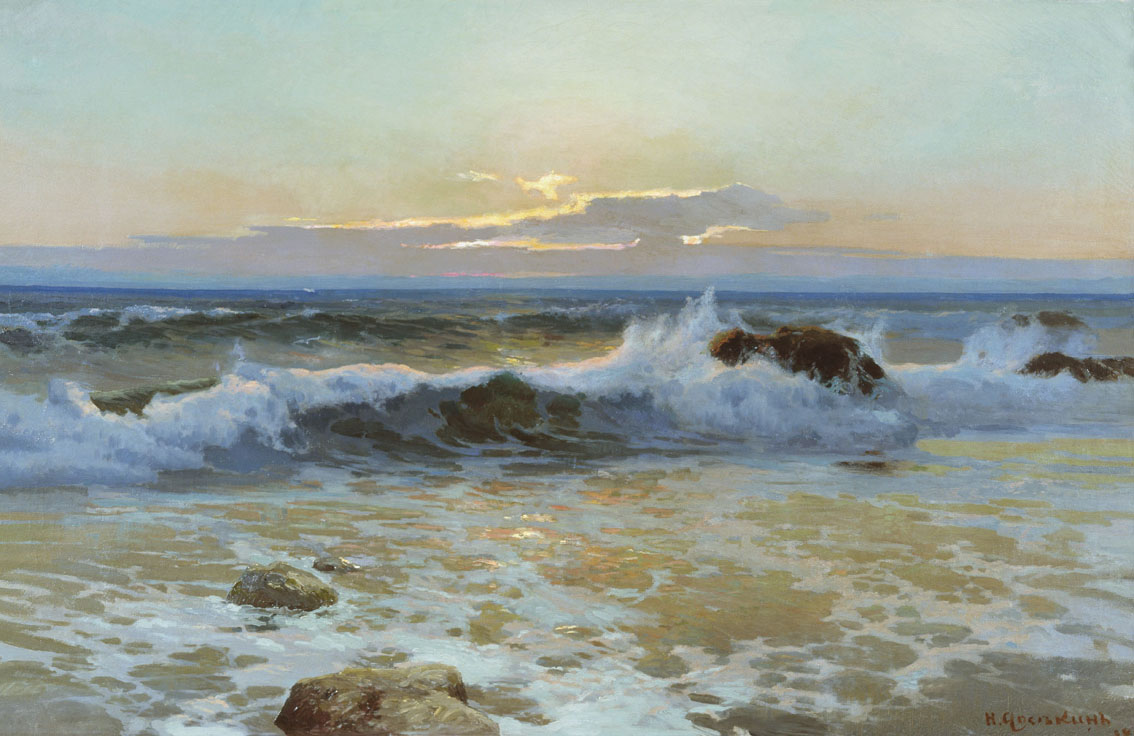
Surf, 1894

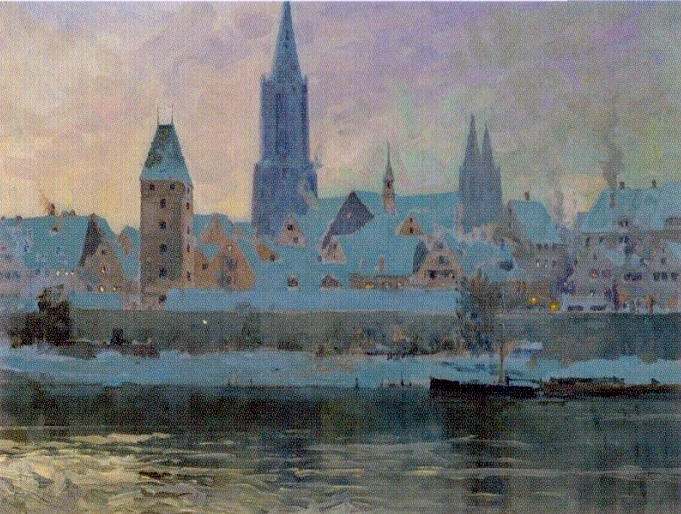
Cologne winter, 1900s
