= Tyko =

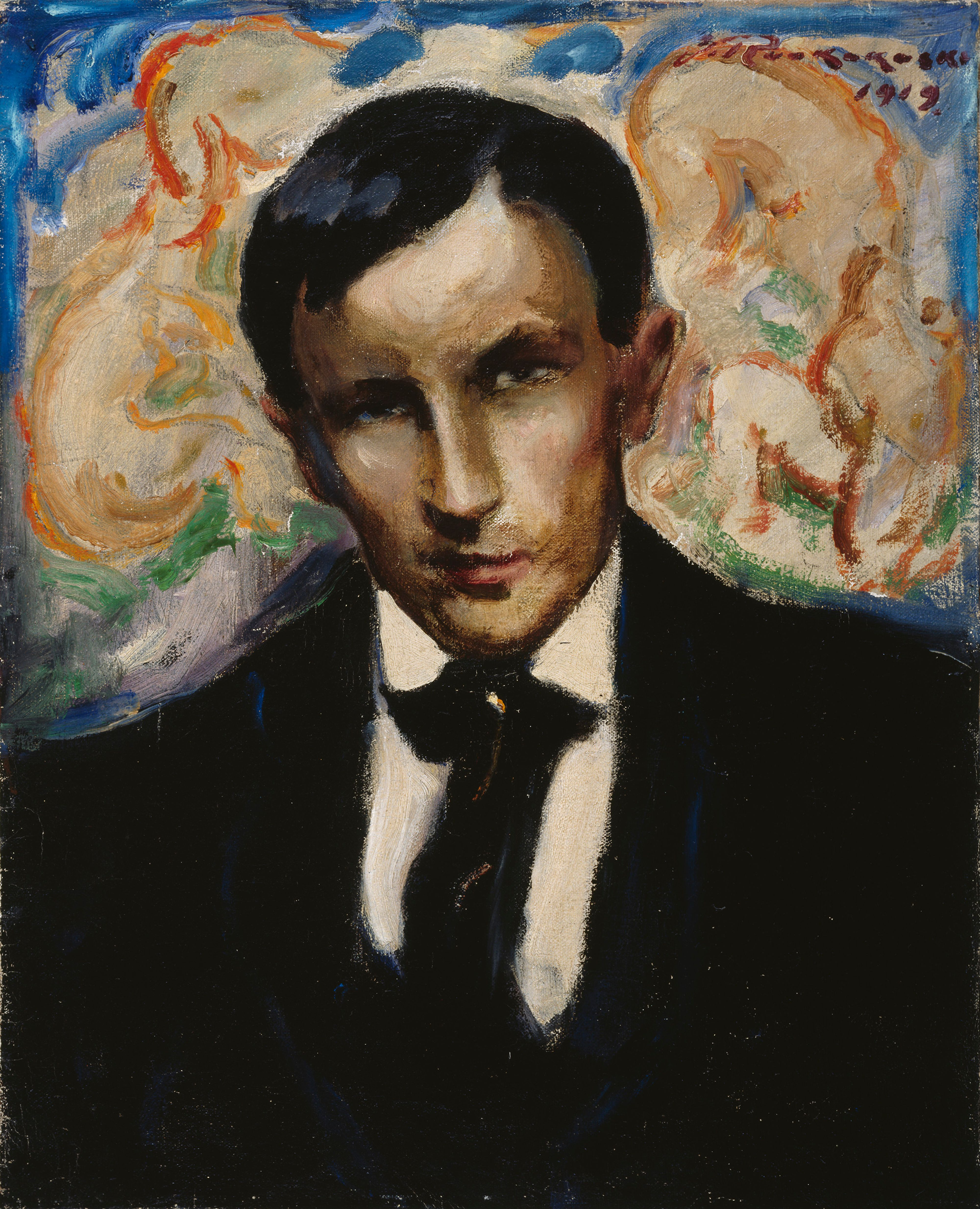
Tyko Sallinen

Tyko is a given name. Notable people with the name include:

- Tyko Reinikka (1887–1964), Finnish bank director and politician
- Tyko Sallinen (1879–1955), Finnish painter
- Tyko Vylka (1886–1960), Nenets painter and author
