= Krasino =

Krasino may refer to:

- Krasino, Bulgaria, a village in Kardzhali Province, Bulgaria
- Krasino, Russia, several inhabited localities in Russia
