= Tyko Vylka =

Soviet painter (1886–1960)

Tyko Vylka (Nenets: Тыко Вылка; 28 February 1886 – 28 September 1960), also known by his Russian name Ilya Konstantinovich Vylka (Russian: Илья Константинович Вылка), was a Soviet and Nenets painter and author, notable for his Arctic landscapes. He was also active in politics and has been elected the chairman of the Novaya Zemlya Island Soviet. Tyko Vylka had been a member of polar expeditions.

Tyko in Nenets language means 'baby polar deer'. Ilya was his baptismal name. His gravestone in Kuznechevskoye Cemetery in Arkhangelsk uses Илья Константинович Тыко-Вылко (Ilya Konstantinovich Tyko-Vylko), which is incorrect.

== Biography ==
Tyko Vylka was born in Belushya Guba in Novaya Zemlya in hunter's family. His father's name was Hanets (Konstantin) Vylka. In 1901, Vylka met Aleksandr Borisov, a pioneer of Russian Arctic landscape painting, who was travelling over the Arctic. Borisov took him into an expedition around Novaya Zemlya and gave him first drawing lessons. In 1903-1904 Vylka also took lessons from Stepan Pisakhov, an artist and an author, who was living in Novaya Zemlya. Pisakhov encouraged Vylka to continue with the painting, but discouraged him from travelling to Moscow or Saint-Petersburg and getting systematic art education there, since he was afraid that life in big cities would spoil Vylka's fresh perception of nature.

In 1904, Vylka investigated the coast of Novaya Zemlya and created a map of the coast. In 1909, he participated in Vladimir Rusanov's Arctic expedition around Novaya Zemlya, and created the map of the archipelago. For his role in the Rusanov's expedition, Vylka was decorated by a medal.

He was initially self-taught painting, and then he left for one year (1910–1911) for Moscow where he studied with Abram Arkhipov and Vasily Pereplyotchikov.

In 1918, Vylka became the Chairman of Belushya Guba settlement Soviet, and from 1925 to 1956 he served as the Chairman of Novaya Zemlya Island Soviet, the governing body of Novaya Zemlya archipelago. In 1956, the whole civil (indigenous) population of Novaya Zemlya was forcedly relocated to enable the usage of the islands as a military base and a nuclear bomb testing ground. After the resettlement, Tyko Vylka lived in Arkhangelsk, where he died in 1960s.

There is a street named in his name in Arkhangelsk. In 1981, a film The Great Sami (Russian: Великий самоед) appeared, featuring the career of Vylka.

== Art ==
After one of the Rusanov's expeditions, Vylka created a report as an album of drawings, which was presented to Tsar Nicholas II. It is generally accepted however that he produced his best paintings in 1950s, after he retired as a politician. These are oil on canvas works, showing northern landscapes, with the dominance of blue and white colors.

== Literature ==
- Воронова, О. П. (1977). Президент Новой Земли Тыко Вылко (in Russian). Moscow: Советский художник.
- Сухановский, Алексей (2008). Тыко Вылка. Сын Полярной звезды (PDF). Библиотека Печорского края (in Russian). Vol. 1. Arkhangelsk: СК-Россия.
