= Anna Nerkagi =

Nenets writer

Anna Pavlovna Nerkagi is a Nenets writer, novelist, and social activist of the Nenets people in Siberia, writing in the Russian language.

== Biography ==
Anna Pavlovna Nerkagi was born on February 15, 1951, on the Yamal Peninsula, near the Kara Sea coast in West Siberia, Russia. In 1958, at the age of six, she was removed from her parents by the Soviet authorities and forced to live in a boarding school, where the indigenous languages and native culture were banned. She was only allowed to visit her parents during holidays. In 1974, she graduated from the Geology Institute at Tyumen Technical University.

Nerkagi debuted as a writer with the autobiographic Aniko of the Nogo clan in 1977. She writes in the Russian language. In 1978, known for publishing Aniko, she became a member of the Writer's Union. She left Tyumen in 1980 and returned to the nomadic way of life in the Yamal Peninsula, where she lives with her husband. In 1990, she started the Tundra School for Nenets Children. She currently lives and works near the village Laborovaya in the Yamal tundra, educating Nenets children.

In 2012, a documentary film about Nerkagi's life, directed by Ekaterina Golovnya, won the Grand Prix at the Radonezh film festival in Russia.

== Bibliography ==
- Aniko of the Nogo clan, 1977
- Ilir, 1979
- The White Yagel, 1986
- The Horde, 1992-1998 (dedicated to the memory of the poet Daniil Andreyev)
- White Arctic Moss, written in 1994, published unabridged in 1996 and in English translation as White Moss in 2026 (a sequel to Aniko of the Nogo clan)
