= Nenets =

Samoyedic ethnic group native to northern arctic Russia

Ненэй, ненэче
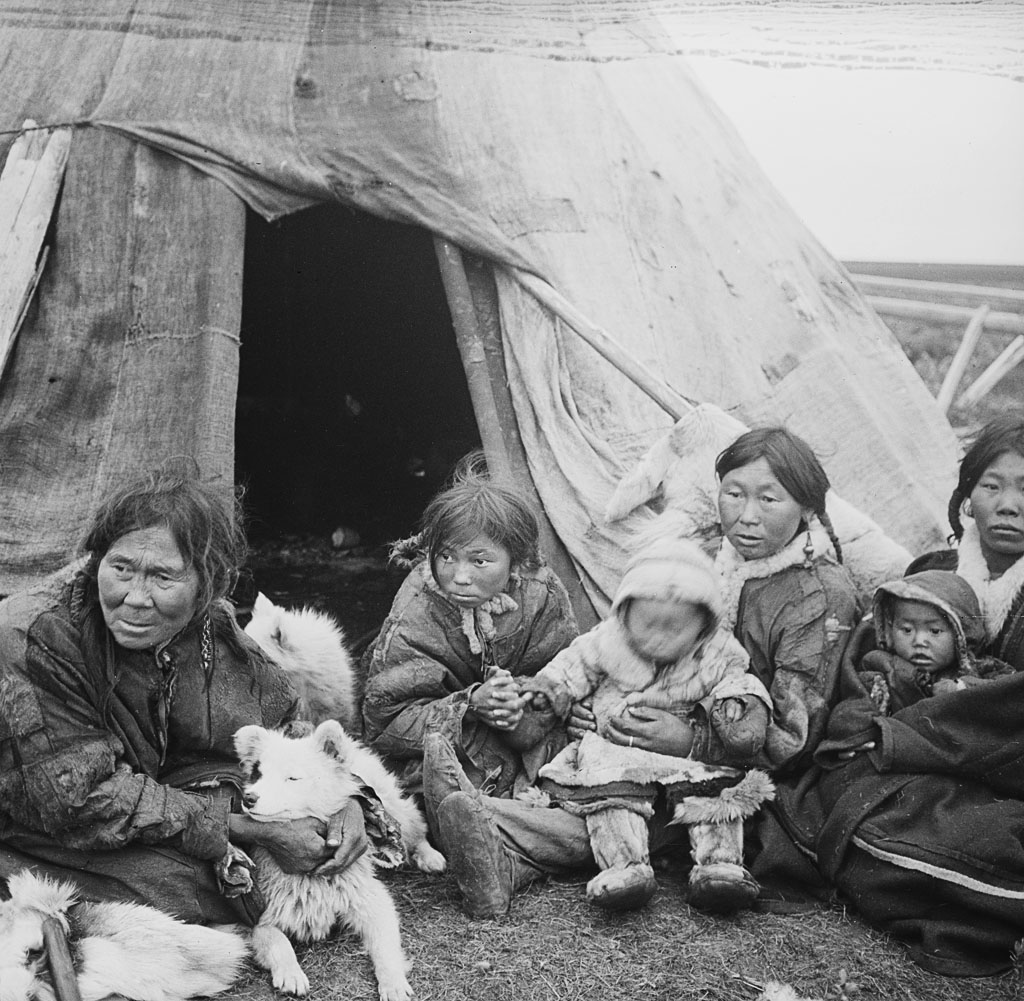
- A Nenets family in the Brekhovskie Islands, 1913

Total population
- c. 50,000

Regions with significant populations
- Russia: Arkhangelsk Oblast: ∟ Nenets Autonomous Okrug: 6,713: Tyumen Oblast: ∟ Yamalo-Nenets Autonomous Okrug: 35,917: 49,646
- Ukraine: 217

Languages
- Nenets, Russian

Religion
- Shamanism, Animism, Russian Orthodoxy

Related ethnic groups
- Enets, Nganasans, Selkups, Zabolotnie Tatars

The Nenets (Nenets: ненэй ненэче, romanized: nenəj nenəče; Russian: ненцы, romanized: nentsy), in the past also called Samoyeds or Yuraks, are a Samoyedic ethnic group native to the Russian Arctic, in the Russian Far North. According to the latest census in 2021, there were 49,646 Nenets in the Russian Federation, most of them living in the Yamalo-Nenets Autonomous Okrug, Nenets Autonomous Okrug and Taymyrsky Dolgano-Nenetsky District stretching along the coastline of the Arctic Ocean near the Arctic Circle between Kola and Taymyr peninsulas. The Nenets people speak either the Tundra or Forest Nenets languages. In the Russian Federation they have a status of Indigenous small-numbered peoples. Today, the Nenets people face numerous challenges from the state and oil and gas companies that threaten the environment and their way of life. As a result, many cite a rise in locally based activism.

== Etymology ==
The old Russian name 'Samoyedy' most probably came from the ancient name of the territory where the Sami and the Nenets lived together Saame edna (the land of Sami). The name 'Samoyed' went out of usage at the beginning of the 20th century. The people are known as the nentsy/nenej nenetsj, which means "real humans".

In the Russian Empire, the term Samoyed was often applied indiscriminately to different peoples of Northern Russia who speak related Uralic languages: Nenets, Nganasans, Enets, Selkups (speakers of Samoyedic languages). Currently, the term "Samoyedic peoples" applies to the whole group of these different peoples.

== Number and settlement ==
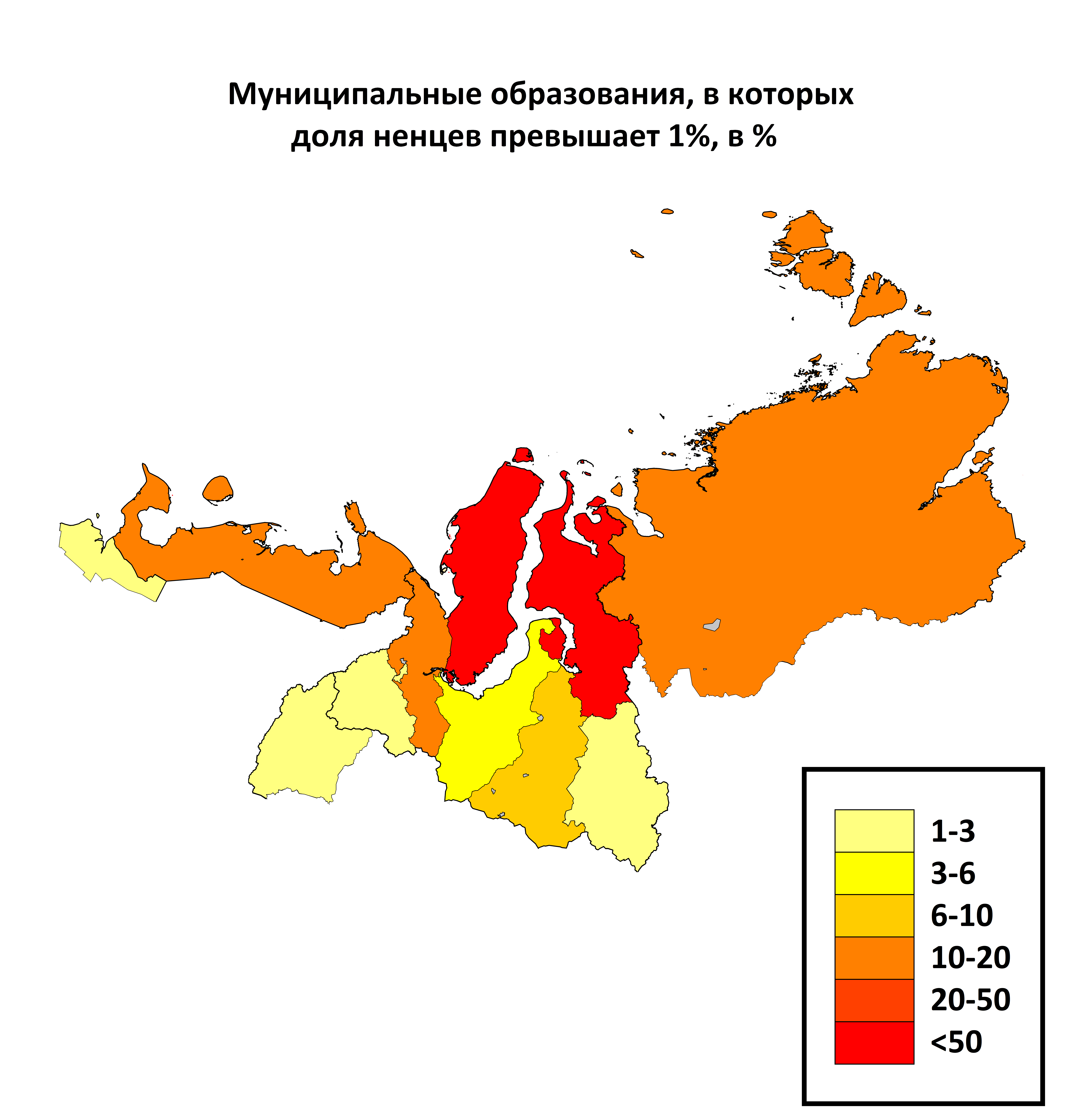
Municipalities in which the proportion of Nenets exceeds 1%, in % according to the 2010 census

The names of two autonomous regions of Russia (Nenets, Yamal-Nenets) mention the Nenets as the titular nationality of the region; another such district (Taimyrsky (Dolgano-Nenetsky) Autonomous Okrug) was abolished in 2007 and transformed into the Taimyrsky Dolgano-Nenetsky District of the Krasnoyarsk Krai.

The Nenets are divided into two groups: tundra and forest; the two groups have different languages. Tundra Nenets are the majority. They live in two autonomous regions. The Forest Nenets – about 1500 people - live in the basin of the Pur and Taz rivers in the southeast of the Yamalo-Nenets Autonomous Okrug and the east of the Khanty-Mansiysk Autonomous Okrug – Yugra.

Nenets population according to 2021 census
	Total	Men	Women
Total	49,787	23,521	26,266
Arkhangelsk Oblast	7,045	3,261	3,784
*Nenets Autonomous Okrug	6,712	3,102	3,620
Tyumen Oblast	37,753	17,915	19,838
*Yamalo-Nenets Autonomous Okrug	35,979	17,089	18,890
*Khanty-Mansi Autonomous Okrug	1,383	656	727
Krasnoyarsk krai	3,853	1,853	1,988
Komi Republic	222	82	140
Murmansk Oblast	112	49	63

According to the 2021 census, there were 49,787 Nenets in Russia.

== Language ==
The Nenets language is on the Samoyedic branch of the Uralic language family, with two major dialects, Forest Nenets and Tundra Nenets. Ethnologue says that in Siberia, most young people are still fluent in Nenets, whereas in European Russia, they tend to speak Russian. Overall, the majority of native speakers are from older generations. UNESCO classifies Nenets as an endangered language. Some believe that the use of Russian and Komi is due to inter-ethnic marriages.

== History ==
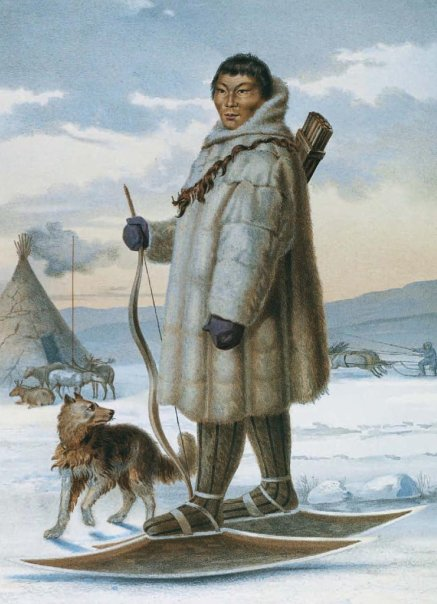
Nenets man, c. 1862

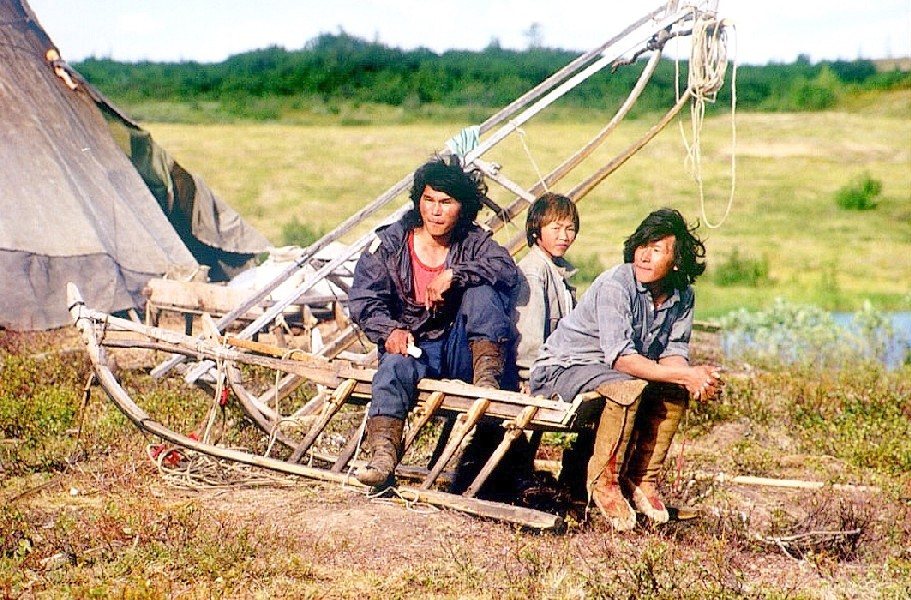
A group of Nenets in Dudinka (2000)

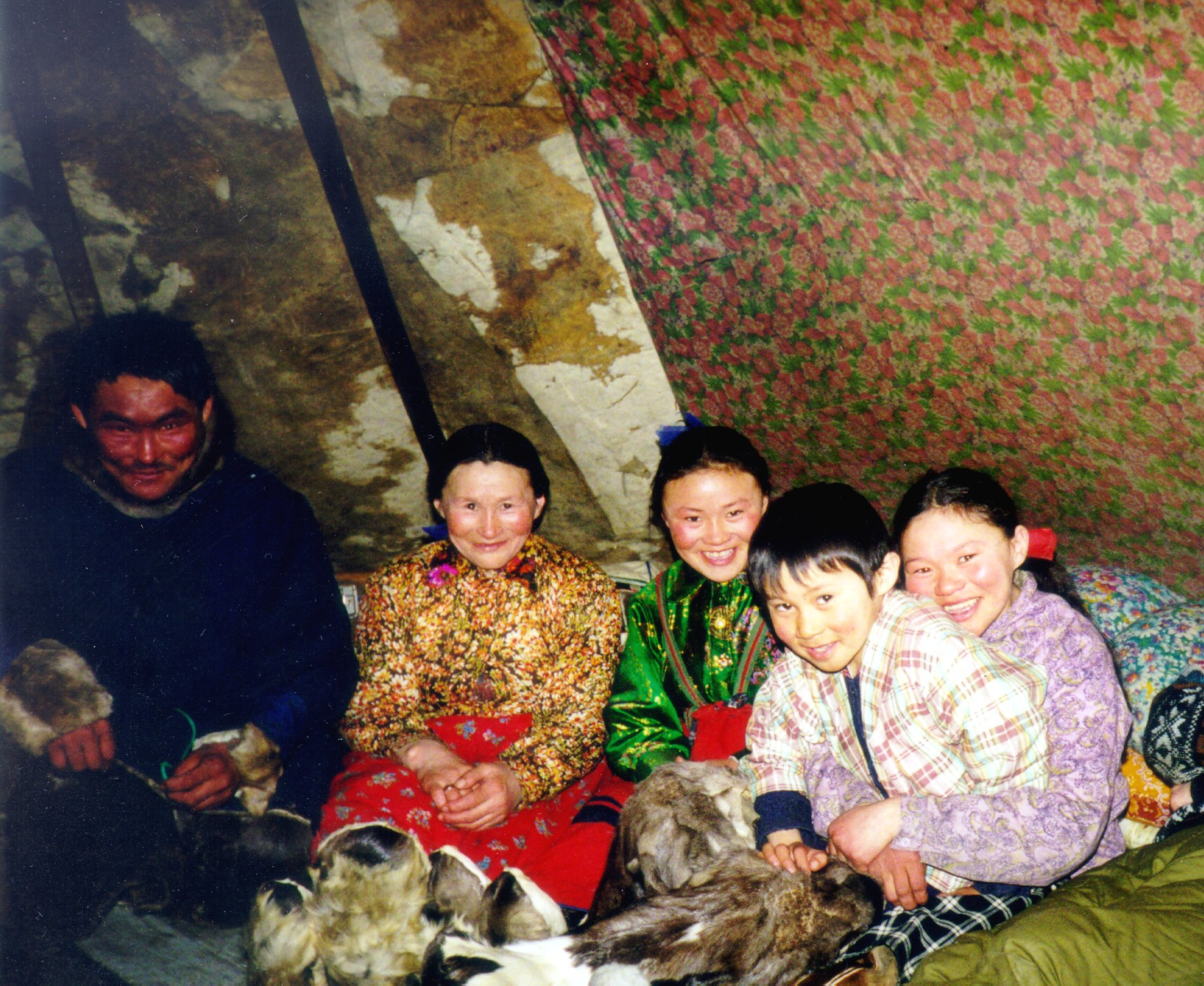
Nenets family, 2006

There are two distinct groups of Nenets sensu stricto, based on their economy: the Tundra Nenets (living far to the north) and the Khandeyar, or Forest Nenets. A distinct third group of Nenets, (Yaran people), has emerged as a result of intermarriages between Nenets and Izhma Komi people.

The Samoyedic languages form a branch of the Uralic language family. According to one theory, they moved from farther south in Siberia to the northernmost part of what later became Russia sometime before the 12th century.

They ended up between the Kanin and Taymyr peninsulas, around the Ob and Yenisey rivers, with only a few of them settling into small communities like Kolva. Their main subsistence comes from hunting and reindeer herding. Using reindeer as a draft animal throughout the year enables them to cover great distances. Large-scale reindeer herding emerged in the 18th century. They bred the Samoyed dog to help herd their reindeer and pull their sleds, and European explorers later used these dogs for polar expeditions, because they were well adapted to the arctic conditions. Tundra wolves can cause considerable economic loss, as they prey on the reindeer herds which are the livelihood of some Nenets families. However, the introduction of snowmobiles in the 1990s allowed the Nenets of the Yamal Peninsula to decimate the local wolf population, as the wolves have nowhere to hide on the open tundra. Along with reindeer meat, fish is a major component in the Nenets' diet. Nenets housing is conical yurt (mya).

They have a shamanistic and animistic belief system which stresses respect for the land and its resources. During migrations, the Nenets placed sacred items like bear skins, religious figures, coins and more on a holy sleigh. The contents of this sacred sleigh are only unpacked during special occasions or for religious rituals (like sacrifices). However, only esteemed elders are allowed to unpack the sacred sleigh. They had a clan-based social structure. The Nenets shaman is called a Tadibya.

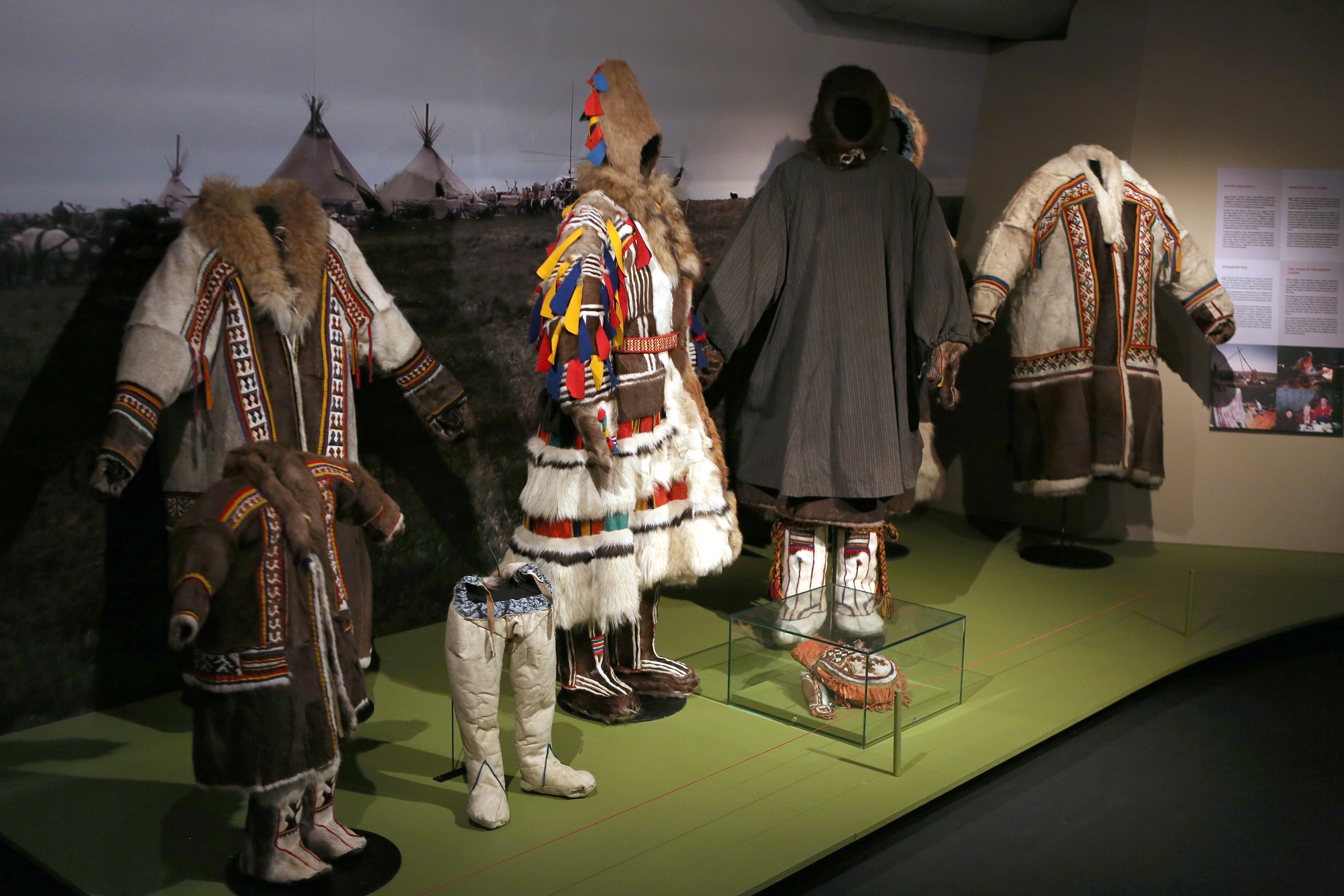
Exhibition dedicated to the culture of the Nenets at Siida museum in Finland

After the Russian Revolution, the Nenets culture suffered due to the Soviet collectivization policy. The government of the Soviet Union tried to force the nomadic Samoyeds to settle down permanently. They were forced to settle in villages and their children were educated in state boarding schools, which resulted in erosion of their cultural identity. One significant way in which the Nenets culture was affected was in the change of the male's societal role. Previously, in the tundra, the male had the very important task of herding the reindeer. However, once the Nenets had to transition to a life away from the tundra, men found that they had lost their role. Much of the responsibility that awaited them in the village was considered, from the traditional point of view, to be women's work. This erasure in the male identity was further enhanced by the Soviet government. In taiga villages occupations such as market gardening, fur farming, cattle breeding, trade, medicine, etc. were emphasized and these happened to be the ones that were marketed towards women. Lastly, the jobs offered by the Soviet government were often occupied by women and not men as many of the men had taken up the habit of hard drinking. Consequently, the once traditional culture of the Nenets people was swiftly upended. Many, especially in the Nenets Autonomous Okrug, lost their mother tongue and became assimilated.

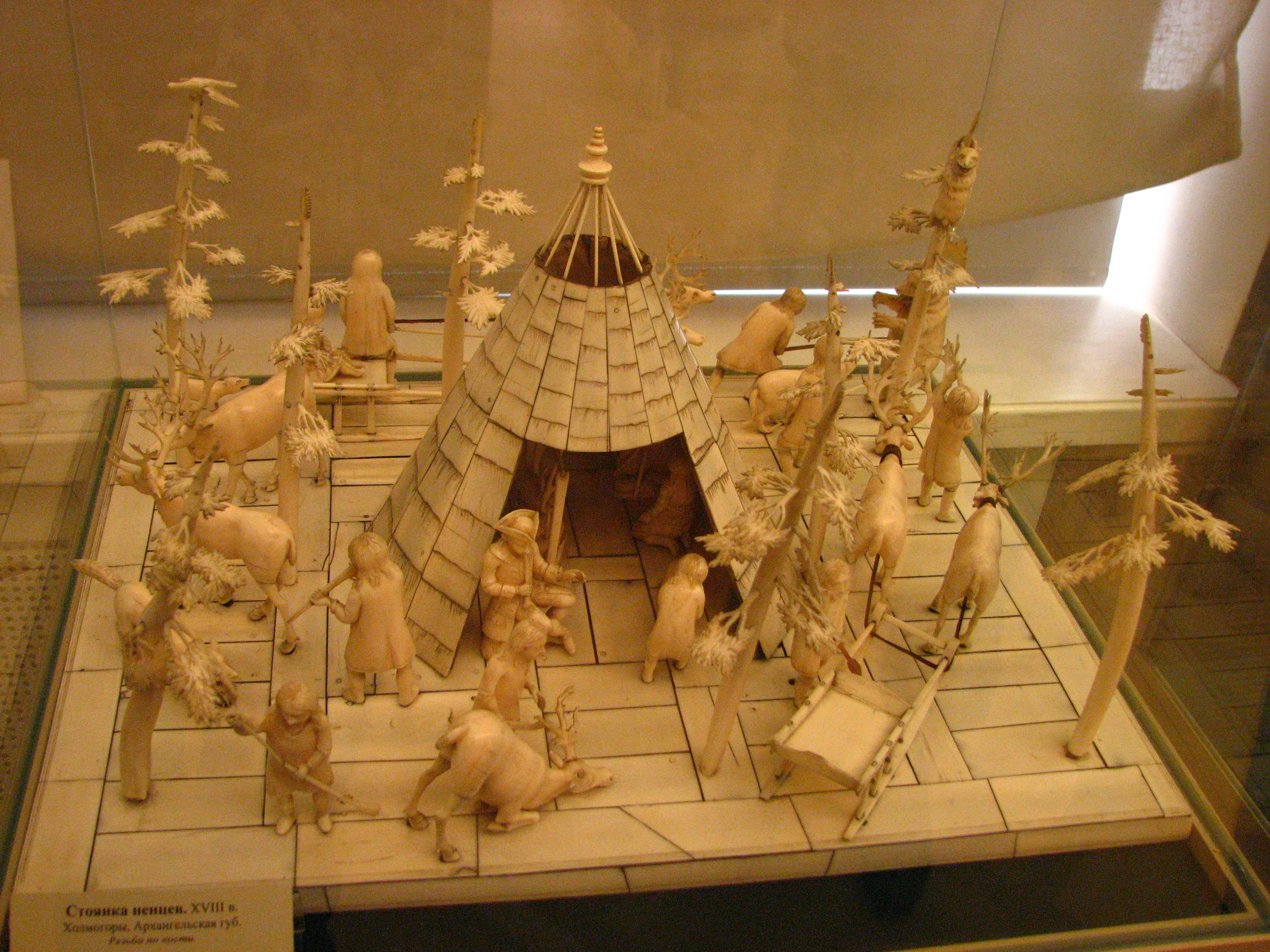
A walrus ivory model of the Nenets encampment (18th century)

One repercussion from the collectivization policy was reindeer ownership. Due to the collectivization policy, many herders moved north while many of those that remained were "deprived of their reindeer". Nenets people once owned many reindeer but after the war, many Nenets had to transition to small-scale herding. Although the Nenets herders were greatly affected, their lifestyle was not at threat for too long. While in the rest of Russia, the collectivization policy lasted for a very long time, it was only invoked onto the Yamal area for a decade. This was because after Stalin's death in 1953, traditional economies were saved. 1950 to 1960 saw a 50% increase of reindeer and this number had almost doubled by 1980. The next few decades saw the slow progress of the Nenets people regaining and preserving their traditional nomadic lifestyle. The accomplishment of appeasing officials while maintaining their culture was achieved through a series of stratagems. For example, herders would often mix up the herds so that inspectors would find it impossible to see the true ratio of private to collective deer. Another method was for young herders to get a job as official workers of the state and pasture their own collective reindeer herd along with the private herd of one of their relatives. Once these herds were together and migration commenced, officials would not be able to know which of the reindeer were privately owned.

Since the 1930s, a few Nenets have expressed themselves professionally through cultural media. For instance, Tyko Vylka and Konstantin Pankov became well-known painters. Anna Nerkagi is one of the most celebrated Nenets writers. Yuri Vella, though living as a reindeer herder, has become the first writer in the Forest Nenets language.

In the context of the Russian invasion of Ukraine since 2022, the Nenets have been reported as one of Russia's ethnic minority groups suffering from a disproportionally large casualty rate among Russian forces. According to activist and researcher Maria Vyushkova, the oil and gas industry in the Nenets Autonomous Okrug "doesn't bring anything to the Indigenous population. On the contrary, it destroys the environment and what they live on - reindeer herding and fishing. Consequently, being in a dire economic situation, people are forced to join the army."

== Environment ==
Although the Nenets people were able to remain resilient in the face of continuous change and maltreatment, a new challenge now awaits them. Environmental damage to the Nenets' is significant due to industrialisation of their land, colonization and climate change. The Nenet people depend heavily on fishing and reindeer herding to support their lifestyle. However, these practices are highly reliant on the environment which is under threat from the oil industry. Specifically, the nomadic lifestyle the Nenet people have been accustomed to for generations is in danger as the oil industries encroach on reindeer pasture and territory. Approximately half of the 10,000 Nenets people in the Yamal Peninsula are nomadic and herd reindeer. With oil industries continuing to expand, the impact on the Nenets people is expected to increase.

=== Oil drilling in the peninsula ===
Since the 1980s, the Arctic Circle has gained the interest of those in the energy and mining industry. Although expansion halted briefly in the 1990s post-USSR disintegration, development picked up in 2004. As oil and gas companies continue to expand, along with it has come an expansion of infrastructure coming in the form of roads, power lines as well as human and vehicle traffic. A big milestone was in 2008, when Gazprom, the largest natural gas company in the world, entered the Yamal peninsula in their efforts to launch the Yamal Megaproject. Gazprom's arrival to the Yamal peninsula has brought about significant change to the area. According to the company's website, they operate a total of 32 fields. These fields bring in up to 360 billion cubic meters of gas per year and in 2019, Gazprom alone produced 96.3 billion cubic meters of gas. Another milestone was when Yamal LNG Project: Novatek, another Russian owned company, partnered with two other international corporations to build a plant on the Yamal peninsula in July 2013.

=== The impact on the Nenets people ===
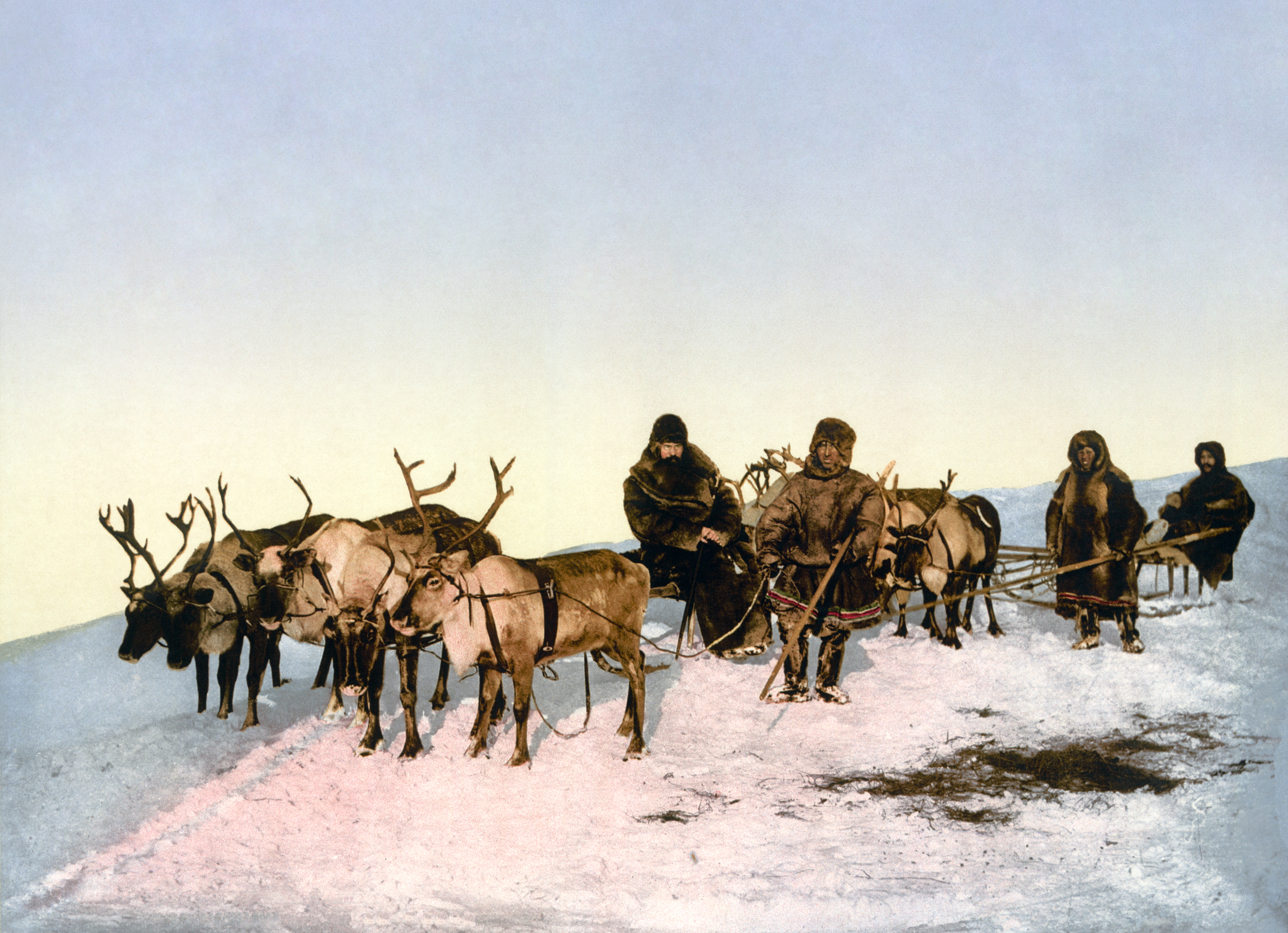
Herders with their reindeer

The impact of large energy corporations in the Yamal peninsula can be felt in numerous ways. The largest of these can be seen in the effects on migration routes. With the Nenets people being nomadic and reliant on reindeer husbandry, the migratory routes for the reindeer are very important to them. These migratory routes are very specific and a lot of consideration goes into planning them. Additionally, the herders believe that it is necessary for the reindeer to migrate in order for them to maintain their good health. The herders claim that this is because the vegetation found on the coast are good for reindeer as they are richer in salt and minerals. Also, by reaching the coast with the migrations, the reindeer are able to find relief from insects such as mosquito and botfly by avoiding infestation periods. These migratory routes that the herders and reindeer use are made of rugged terrain as they provide a good space to herd the reindeer. However, the companies that enter the Yamal peninsula also prefer this rugged terrain to build their infrastructure upon, causing a direct overlap in land of interest. For example, in the Bovanenko core area, a research study was conducted that found that industrial development targeted "rugged, elevated drier land" which is the type of land used by the reindeer herders. Thus, as the Nenets people rely on reindeer that, in turn, rely on the migratory routes, the expansion of industrial development has had a large impact on the Nenets people.

Although not directly related to migration routes, another impact is the effect on Nenets peoples' sacred spots. The Nenets people have a tradition of designating a sacred spot where they make a request of the spirits for a successful migration. Nenets sacred spots are made into a major sand/quarry pit and marked by wooden pegs. In one case, a sacred spot of the Nenets people was fenced in during the industrial development, dissolving it of its traditional significance. Many of the workers believed that their construction did not actually intrude on the sacred spot, however many of the herders believed that the spot had been "desecrated". This difference in perceptions highlights how many non-Indigenous people are only able to view land as something to be owned. Meanwhile, for Indigenous people, such a viewpoint is non-existent. Herders have a spiritual relationship with the land and do not view it as simply owned vs not-owned.

Another smaller effect of the industrial development has been its impact on fish. Due to the industrial development, there has been a degradation of freshwater sources which has led to a decrease in the population. Additionally, the industrial development has spilled over to occupy much of the fishing grounds necessary for the Nenets people. As the Nenets people depend on the fish as their source of food in the summer, the depletion of fish has directly impacted the Nenets people.

Lastly, an impact that is loosely related with the migration routes is accessibility to health care clinics by the Nenets people. Since the arrival of large oil and gas companies in the 1990s, climate in the region has been impacted. In fact, since 1991 temperature anomalies in the Kanin have increased an estimated 1.4 degrees Celsius per decade. Within this same period, researchers found a trend of delayed herder arrivals to their local health clinic. Researchers cite the lengthening of the migrations as the reason for the delay. As the herders need open water to freeze to make crossings of reindeer and herders possible, there is a specific window in which herders can visit their local health clinics. Since 1991, the arrival of herders at one health clinic can be observed shifting from October to December, marking an evident postponement in arrival.

=== Nenets activism ===
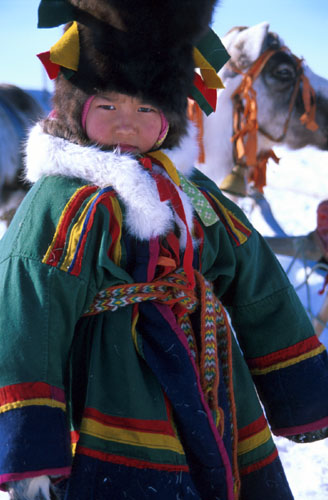
Nenets child

There are some Nenets people, activists, and researchers who are nervous about the current situation in the Yamal peninsula. They worry that the authorities of the Nenets people will make a deal to merge with another region. Nenets people worry that the deal will lead to a further decline in their autonomy as well as their language and traditions.

Nenets people also face danger from industrial companies. Although the industrial companies have paid compensation to the Nenets people and made efforts to assist them, some experts say that the current process does not allow for participation from the Nenets people. The relationship is described by some as "paternalistic" because it does not allow Nenets people to make their own decisions.

The Nenets people have previously attempted to organize and protest against these oil and gas companies. However, it is difficult for the nomadic people to gather as a collective unit as they live so far apart from each other. Yuri Vella is a notable example of an individual protestor. Vella was a Nenets writer and, having lived near a lake that was licensed over to an oil company, protested often. Most notably, he is remembered for having stood up against a bulldozer alone with an axe.

Vella is not alone in his activism. There exists a rural protest community called Voice of the Tundra that currently speaks on topics such as the rights of the Nenets people. As aforementioned, it is difficult to gather collectively and so this community relies on VKontakte, a Russian online service, to mobilize and communicate. Additionally, rather than being led by lawyers or journalists or scholars, the community has a young reindeer herder from the tundra as their leaders. The Voice of the Tundra focuses its attention on three main issues: a shortage of land for the reindeer due to oil and gas companies expanding use of the territories, the uncertainty surrounding the future of nomadic reindeer herding, and the lack of Indigenous leadership and organization.

The Voice of the Tundra project is being celebrated as it symbolizes a return of politics to Russia's Indigenous peoples. Specifically, a reindeer herder by the name of Eiko Serotetto is being heralded as the main activist generating the change. Serotetto is not someone who has had a traditional background or education. However, in 2016, he demonstrated that this would not weigh him down when he began to take action in the aftermath of the anthrax epidemic. Serotetto posted a petition on social media that asked for attention to be brought to the Indigenous peoples and their reindeers. Serotetto requested protection of Indigenous habitats, reindeer, and rights. This petition brought attention to the Russian officials who were not addressing the "real life of the tundra and Indigenous people". Later, Serotetto's most impactful petition was made when he advocated for the boycott of Russian oil and gas.

Although there are many Nenets people who are against the industrial development going on in the Yamal peninsula such as the activists aforementioned, there are also many who are in support of the developments. Those who are in favour of the developments highlight the economic benefits that they are able to receive. In a research study conducted in the area, one villager reported that they were able to coexist with the industries through social agreements, voluntary giving, and compensation for damages.

Some argue that this variance in support for the industrial companies from the Nenets people lies in factors such as active leadership from community leaders. This reasoning can be seen as falling similarly in line with what the Voice of the Tundra was fighting for, as it can be seen that proper Indigenous leadership and involvement can lead to higher satisfaction among the Nenets people.

== Genetics ==
Nenets men typically carry the haplogroup N. 57.4% of them belong to the subclade N1b-P43 and 40.5% have the subclade N1c. An older study found a minority of R1a (m17) and R1-m173 Lineages, perhaps reflecting southern admixtures. Autosomally Nenets' ancestry can be modelled to be 79% Nganasan-like.

== Notable Nenets ==
- Tyko Vylka (1886–1960), painter
- Konstantin Pankov (1910–1942), painter
- Yuri Vella (1948–2013), writer, poet, environmentalist, social activist
- Anna Nerkagi (b. 1952), writer, novelist, social activist
- Anastasia Lapsui (b. 1944), film director, screenwriter

== See also ==
- Music of Nenetsia
- Nga (god)
- Samoyed (dog)
- Siberian minorities in the Soviet era
- Pole worship
