= Vasily Dosekin =

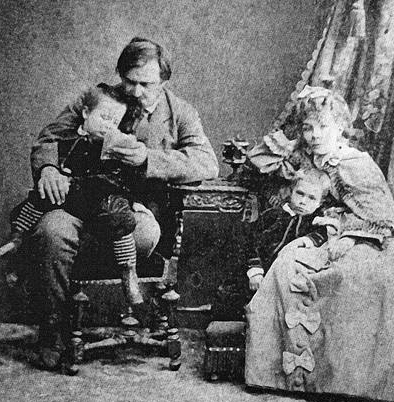
Self-portrait, with his daughter and grandchildren (1880s)

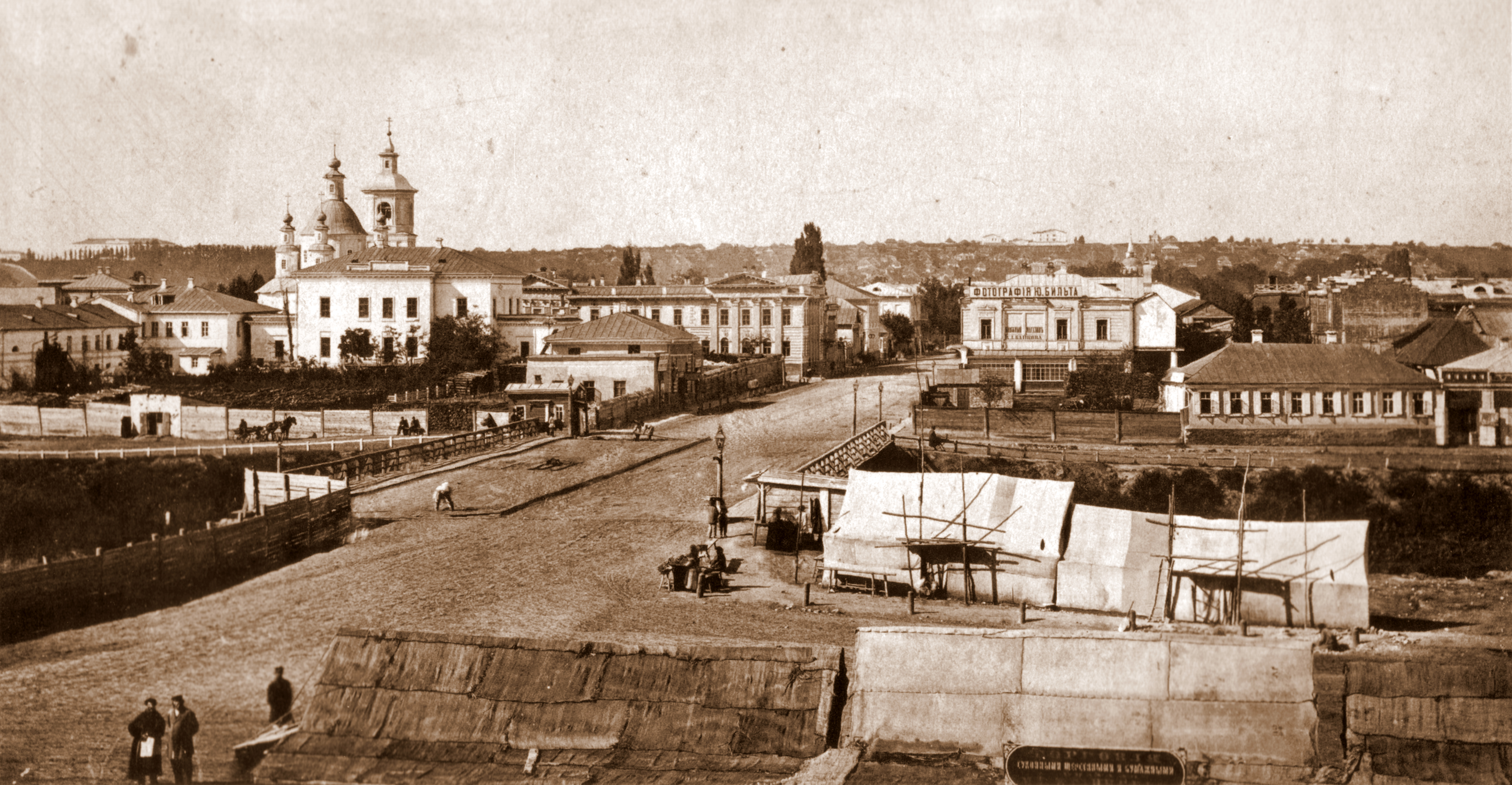
View of Kharkiv from University Hill (1879)

Vasily Sergeyevich Dosekin (Russian: Василий Сергеевич Досекин; 1829 – 1900 in Kharkiv) was a Russian photographer. From c.1860 to c.1890, he created portraits of notable people, including the Imperial Family.

== Biography ==
He was an hereditary nobleman, and served as a second lieutenant in the Crimean War, where he was wounded. In 1856, he was sent to Kharkiv for treatment, and established a workshop there in 1857; making portraits of local residents and cityscapes. He opened his first photography studio in 1864, in Kursk. By 1875, he was able to open another studio, in Moscow, on Tverskaya Street. His son, Nikolay, who became a well known Impressionist painter, began his career by working in his father's studios.

His cityscape photographs would later appear in Харьков, его прошлое и настоящее в рисунках и описаниях: Историко-справочный путеводитель (Kharkov, its Past and Present, drawings and descriptions: Historical and Reference Guide, 1902), by Alexander Gusev, and История города Харькова за 250 лет его существования (History of the City of Kharkov for 250 Years of its Existence, 1905–1912), a monograph in two volumes by Dmytro Bahaliy.

Both of his studios featured popular photography workshops, with the latest equipment. He was one of the first photographers in that region to switch from calotypes to wet-plate collodion, for higher quality negatives. During this period, he participated in numerous exhibitions and, in 1865, was awarded a medal in Berlin. At the Polytechnic Exhibition in Moscow (1872), he was presented with a gold medal for "full-length portraits".

In addition to his studios, he was also the owner of a brick factory on the outskirts of Kharkiv, which he opened in 1873, together with an old friend from the army, Captain Arkady Ionin.

He died in 1900, and was buried in Saint John's Cemetery. A street near some gardens that had been inherited by his daughter Maria was named after him. Following the Revolution, it was renamed "Lenin Street".
