= Sergei Pankov =

Sergei Pankov may refer to:

- Sergei Pankov (footballer) (born 1978), Russian football player
- Sergey Pankov (swimmer) (born 1988), Uzbekistani swimmer
