= Krasino, Russia =

Krasino (Russian: Kpacинo) is the name of several rural localities in Russia:

- Krasino, Arkhangelsk Oblast, a settlement in Novaya Zemlya District of Arkhangelsk Oblast
- Krasino, Moscow Oblast, a settlement in Moscow Oblast
- Krasino, Smolensk Oblast, a settlement in Smolensk Oblast
- Krasino-Uberezhnoye, a settlement in Tula Oblast
