= Pankau =

Pankau is a German surname. Notable people with the surname include:

- Carole Pankau (born 1947), American politician, Republican Illinois State Senator
- Herbert Pankau (born 1941), German footballer

== See also ==
- Pankow (surname)
