= Tadibya =

Spiritual mediator among Nenets people

Tadibya (tádyebya; Russian: тадебя) is the mediator between the ordinary world and the upper- and underworlds of the spirits among the Nenets people. The Nenets rank their shamans by their spiritual attachment and function as well as their experience.

== Categories ==
The following categories of Nenets shamans are listed by Mihaly Hoppal, who cites research conducted by L. Khomitch and Leonid A. Lar.

- Vidutana, strong shamans standing in contact with the upper world
- Yanyani tadebya, shamans belonging to the earth
- Sambana shamans, shamans able to receive messages from dead people and to perform other rituals concerning the dead.
