= Yuri Vella =

Nenets writer, poet, environmentalist and social activist

Yurii Kilevich Aivaseda (1948 - Sept. 2013), also known by the pseudonym Yuri Vella, was a writer, poet, environmentalist and social activist of the Forest Nenets people from Western Siberia.

== Biography ==
Yuri Vella was born in the Varyogan village in Siberia in 1948. In the 1990s, he moved with his family from the Varyogan village to the tundra of the Agan River to revive the traditional Nenets way of life and become a reindeer herder.

He was a writer and poet writing in the Forest Nenets language, the Khanty language and in Russian. He was a social activist - in 1990, he organised a protest on behalf of the Nenets people in the Varegansk area, Yamal, against the gas and oil industry expanding into Yamal. The energy industry was destroying the environment, killing the reindeer, and displacing and persecuting the indigenous people. The protest was recorded by Russian TV.

In 1996, he created a small Taiga school to teach the traditional reindeer herding skills to Nenets children. The school was closed in 2009, when the attending children grew older and left for other education.

In 2008, a documentary film about Vella, called Yuri Vella's world - the DER documentary, was created by Liivo Niglas.

== Bibliography ==
The following works of Vella were published in the 2010 anthology Way of Kinship: Anthology of Native Siberian Literature, pages 78-93

- At the Bus Stop
- Watching TV
- On Things Eternal
- To the Bear
- Song of the Reindeer Breeder
- Eternal Sky
- The Little Shaman and Other Stories
- Morning at the Lake
- Fyodor the Hunter
- News from Vatyegan Camp

Vella's poem "To the Bear" was also published in the anthology Grrrrr: A Collection of Poems about Bears, published by Arctos Press, 2000, ISBN 9780965701518.
