= Krasino, Arkhangelsk Oblast =

Krasino Kpacинo
- Work settlement
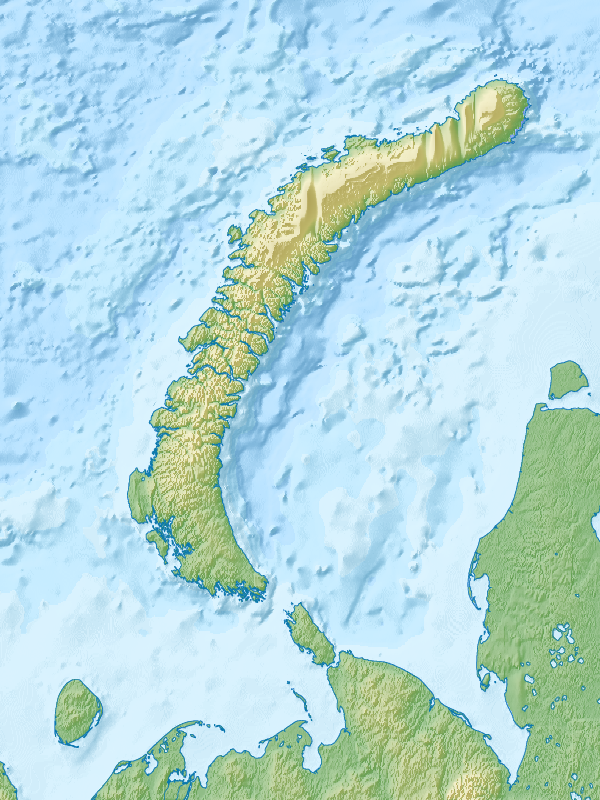
- Krasino on Novaya Zemlya
- Location of Krasino
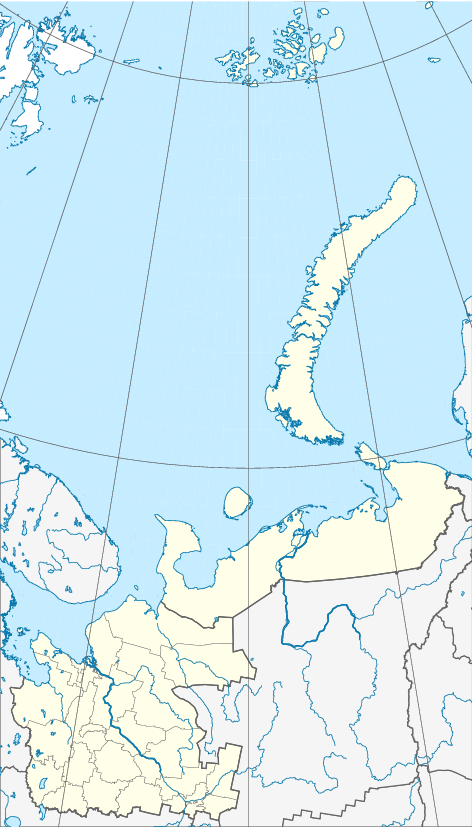
- Location of Krasino Krasino (Russia)
- Coordinates: 70°44′11″N 54°27′56″E
- Country: Russia
- Federal subject: Arkhangelsk Oblast
- Administrative district: Novaya Zemlya District
- Elevation: 14 m (46 ft)

Municipal status
  - Urban okrug: Novaya Zemlya Urban Okrug

Krasino (Russian: Kpacинo) is a small Russian settlement in Arkhangelsk Oblast, on the southern island of Novaya Zemlya. First settled in 1925 due to Soviet Arctic studies, the population was predominantly Russian with a Nenet minority. During the Cold War, Krasino was the centre of the Novaya Zemlya southern test site (NZSTS), which saw air, underwater, and underground tests of nuclear weapons.

There is a lighthouse near the settlement, which is still in working order.
