= Sergei Pankov (footballer) =

Russian footballer

Personal information
- Full name: Sergei Yevgenyevich Pankov
- Date of birth: 31 December 1978 (age 47)
- Place of birth: Kemerovo, Russian SFSR, USSR
- Height: 1.89 m (6 ft 2 1/2 in)
- Position: Goalkeeper

Senior career*
Years	Team	Apps	(Gls)
1997–1998	FC Mezhdurechensk	24	(0)
1999–2000	FC Kuzbass Kemerovo	42	(0)
2001–2002	FC Chkalovets-Olimpik Novosibirsk	30	(0)
2002	FC Chkalovets-1936 Novosibirsk	6	(0)
2003–2005	FC Metallurg Lipetsk	59	(0)
2006	FC Spartak Nizhny Novgorod	12	(0)
2007	FC Metallurg Lipetsk	22	(0)
2008	FC Mordovia Saransk	16	(0)
2009	FC Astrakhan	12	(0)
- * Club domestic league appearances and goals

Sergei Yevgenyevich Pankov (Russian: Серге́й Евгеньевич Панков; born 31 December 1978) is a former Russian professional football player.

== Club career ==
He played 4 seasons in the Russian Football National League for FC Metallurg Lipetsk and FC Spartak Nizhny Novgorod.
