= Gisela Pankow =

French psychoanalyst (1914–1998)

- Born: 25 February 1914; Düsseldorf
- Died: 14 August 1998 (aged 84); Berlin
- Known for: non-traditional techniques in the treatment of the psychotic

Gisela Pankow (25 February 1914 – 14 August 1998) was a French psychoanalyst.

Pankow dedicated her life to challenging Freud's assertion regarding the impracticality of psychoanalytic treatment for psychoses. Remaining within the framework of Freudian metapsychology, she innovatively addressed certain technical aspects, such as incorporating clay modeling into sessions. Pankow formulated an approach within the realm of psychosis that alleviates the challenges faced by psychotic individuals in articulating their worldview. Followed by her clinical practice, Pankow's perspectives on the "lived body" and the "symbolizing functions of the body" represent a distinctive synthesis of psychoanalysis and phenomenology.

Her work was used by Deleuze in The Logic of Sense and Anti-Oedipus.

== Biography ==
Gisela Pankow was born in Düsseldorf on February 25, 1914.

She began clinical and theoretical research in psychosis in the 1950s. Her main thesis (Pankow 1974), illustrated by two cases, was published in 1956.

Pankow died on August 14, 1998 at the age of 84 in Berlin.

== Notable works ==
- Pankow, Gisela (1961). "Dynamic structurization in schizophrenia". Psychotherapy of the Psychoses: 152–171. doi:10.1037/10643-006.
- Pankow, G. W. (1974). "The body image in hysterical psychosis". The International Journal of Psycho-Analysis. 55 (3): 407–414. PMID 4448606.

== See also ==
- Body without organs
- Foreclosure
