= Vasily Pereplyotchikov =

Russian painter

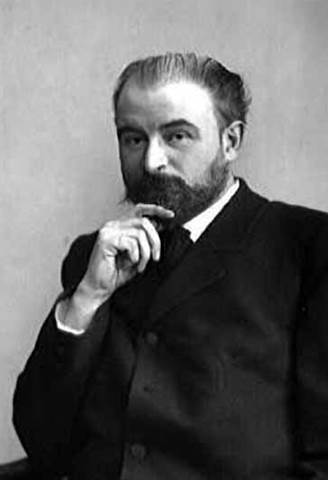
Vasily Pereplyotchikov (1900s)

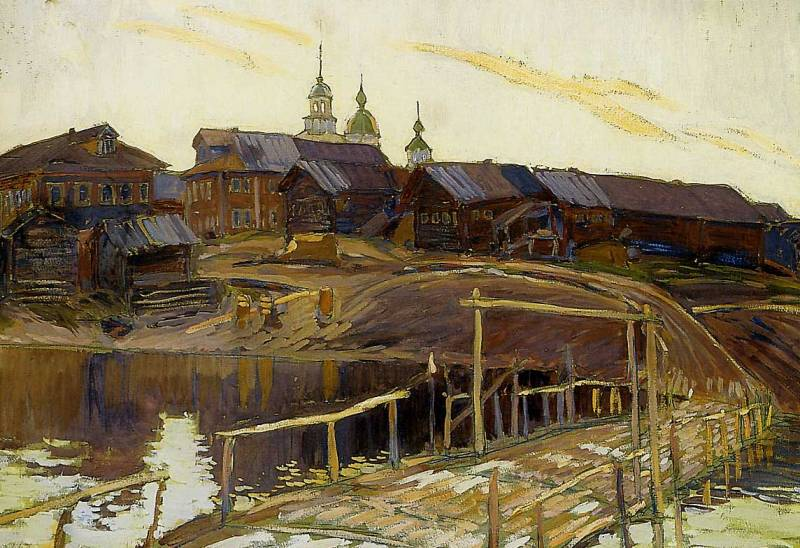
Onega Beach on a Sunny day

Vasily Vasilievich Pereplyotchikov (Russian: Васи́лий Васи́льевич Переплётчиков; (18 October 1863, Moscow – 1918, Moscow) was a Russian landscape painter; associated with the Peredvizhniki from 1893 to 1901.

== Biography ==
He was born to a family of well-to-do merchants and began his formal education at the Academy of Commercial Sciences. At the same time, he became interested in art and took private lessons from Alexander Kiselyov. In 1872, he started auditing classes at the Moscow School of Painting, Sculpture and Architecture; planning to become an architect. A meeting with Ivan Shishkin convinced him that he would rather be a painter, so he switched to courses taught by Vasily Polenov.

He later developed an interest in drawing and, from 1880, he made regular sketching trips to Zvenigorod (with Sergei Korovin) and to Plyos (with Sergei Vinogradov). He also began to hold regular exhibits at his alma mater.

After 1886, he and his colleagues published an occasional journal; «Периодического выпуска рисунков русских художников» (Periodical Publication of Drawings of Russian Artists). The first issue included works by Korovin, Sergei Ivanov, Isaac Levitan, Viktor Simov and Alexei Stepanov.

In the early 1890s, he became a lecturer at the School of Fine Arts operated by the architect, Anatoly Gunst. An album of his drawings was published in 1891. The following year he, Kiselyov, Nikolai Clodt and Leonid Pasternak were featured in a special edition of the magazine, «Артист» (Artist). From 1899 to 1903, he exhibited with Mir Iskusstva. In 1903, he became one of the founding members of the Union of Russian Artists.

In 1902, a trip to Arkhangelsk with his friend, Vinogradov, had a decisive effect on his style. From then on, most of his works would have Northern themes and he visited the area every year until 1914; often going to places that were dangerous to reach. In 1904, under the influence of Igor Grabar, he began experimenting with pointillism.
