= Konstantin Pankov =

Nenets/Mansi Soviet painter

Konstantin Pankov Константин Панков
- Born: 1910; Saranpaul, Russian Empire
- Died: 1942; Volkhov Front, Soviet Union

Konstantin Leonidovich Pankov (Russian: Константин Леонидович Панков, 1910–1942) was an ethnically Nenets/Mansi Soviet painter. Born in the far north in a family of hunters, he started to paint landscapes while never having seen any paintings.

Pankov was born in 1910 in the village Saranpaul which is now in Beryozovsky District, Khanty-Mansi Autonomous Okrug, in the Northern Urals. His father was a Nenets, his mother a Mansi.

He entered the Institute for Peoples of the North in Leningrad. The art studio of the institute was supervised by A. Uspensky and L. Mess. Pankov and his studio mates had no idea of the long-standing traditions of Western and Russian art before they came to Leningrad, for they had simply never seen a picture. Uspensky and Mess did not want to rush things, because Pankov had never seen a picture in his life, except the portraits at the Institute, and might have taken the first masterpiece he saw for an inviolable standard to follow and surrendered his will to somebody else's way of vision.

The traditions of "anonymous" art, folklore, are obvious in Pankov's works.

Pictures by Pankov and his studio mates were repeatedly reproduced in many magazines in the thirties. They decorated the Pavilion of the Far North at the All-Union Agricultural Exhibition and the Soviet Pavilion at the Paris Exposition of 1937. The Jury of the Exposition rated the works of the painters of the Far North, notably Pankov, who were awarded the Grand Prix and Gold Medals. The Honorary Diploma of the Exposition conferred upon the Institute for Peoples of the North is kept at the Leningrad Museum of the Arctic.

As soon as World War II began, Pankov joined the Red Army as a sniper and scout, making use of his knowledge of the North. He was fighting on the Volkhov Front in 1942 when he was killed in action.

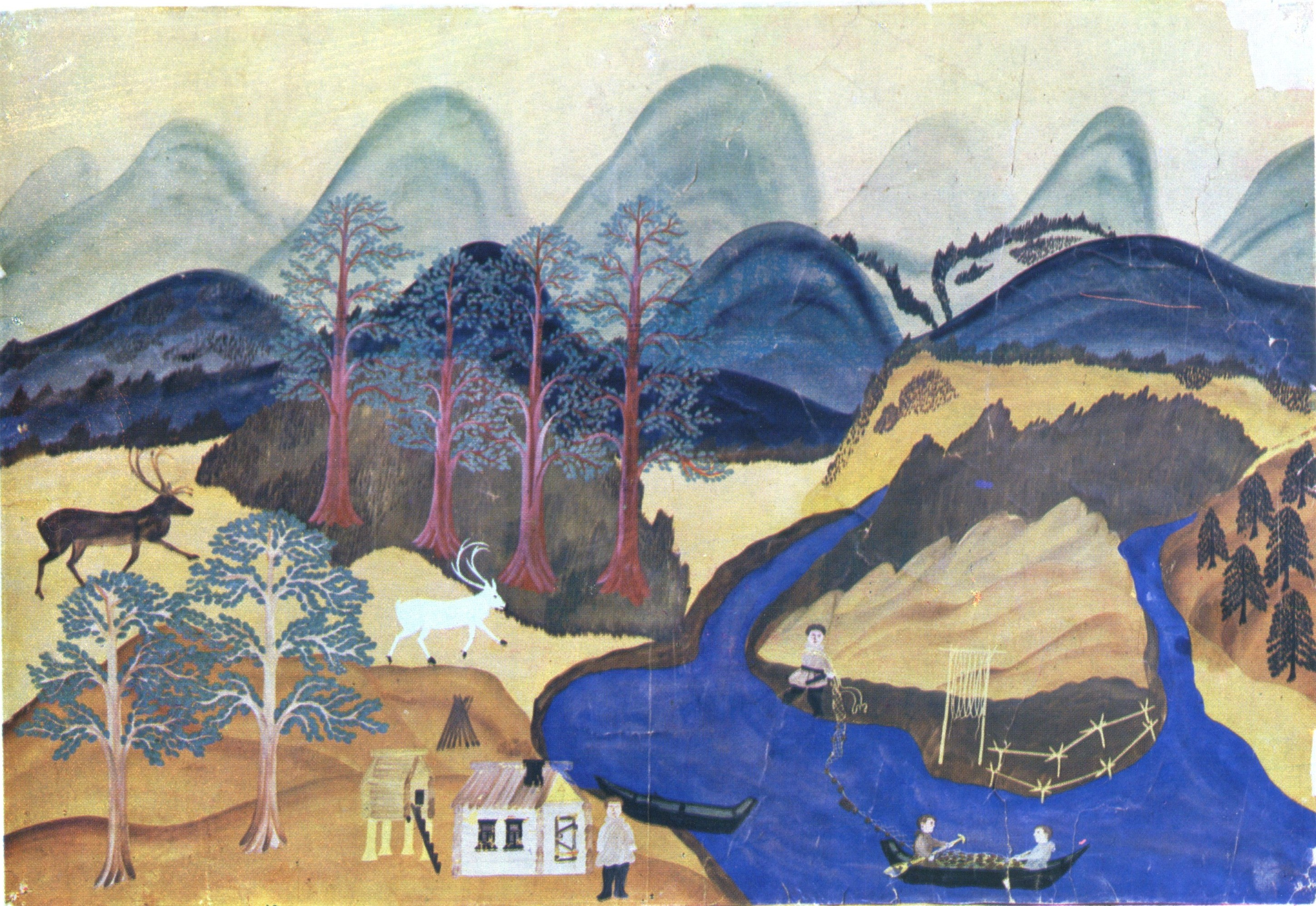
Fishermen

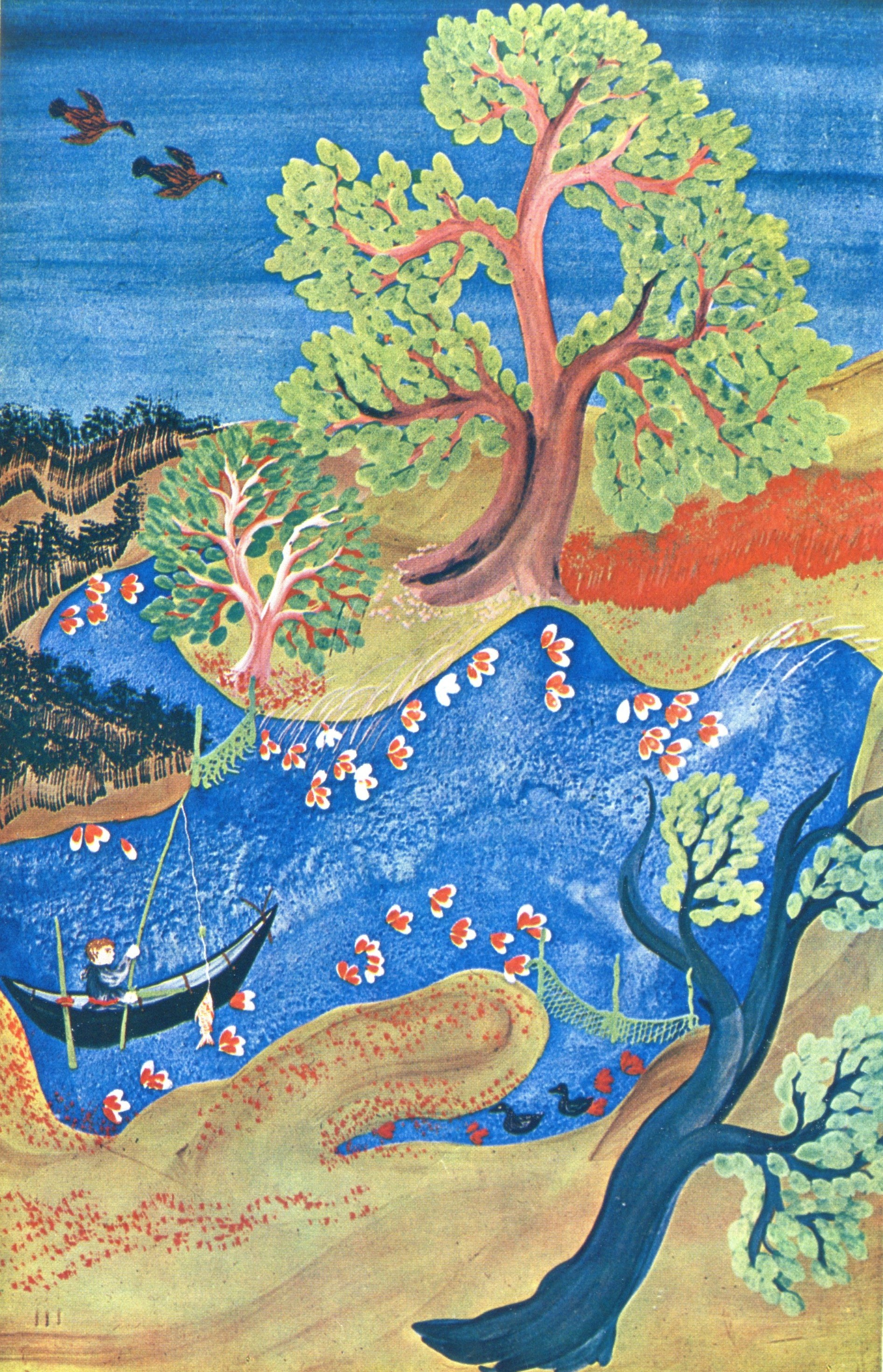
Spring

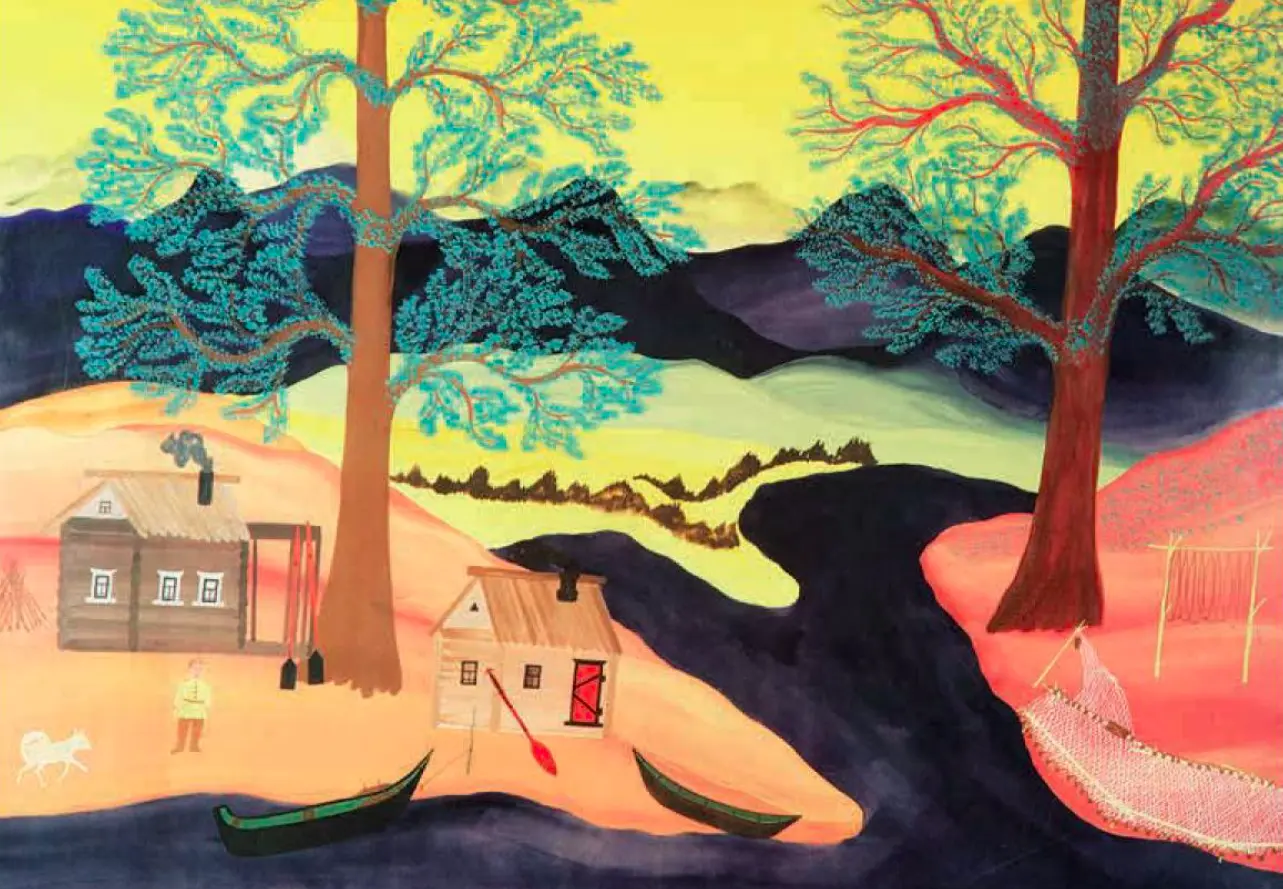
Fisherman's Camp House, 1930

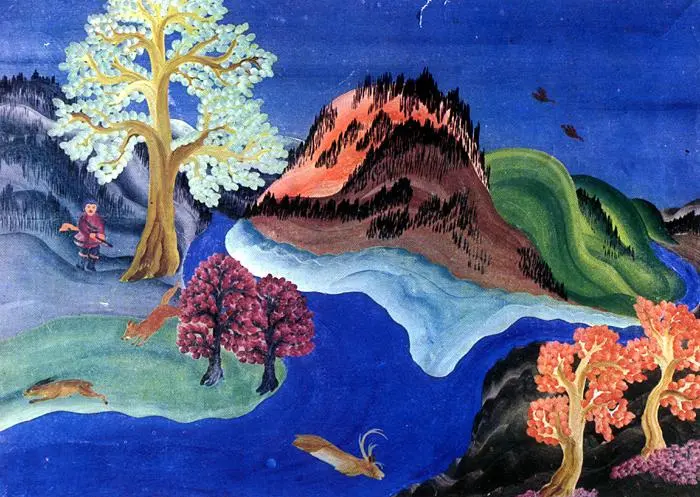
Hunting, 1940

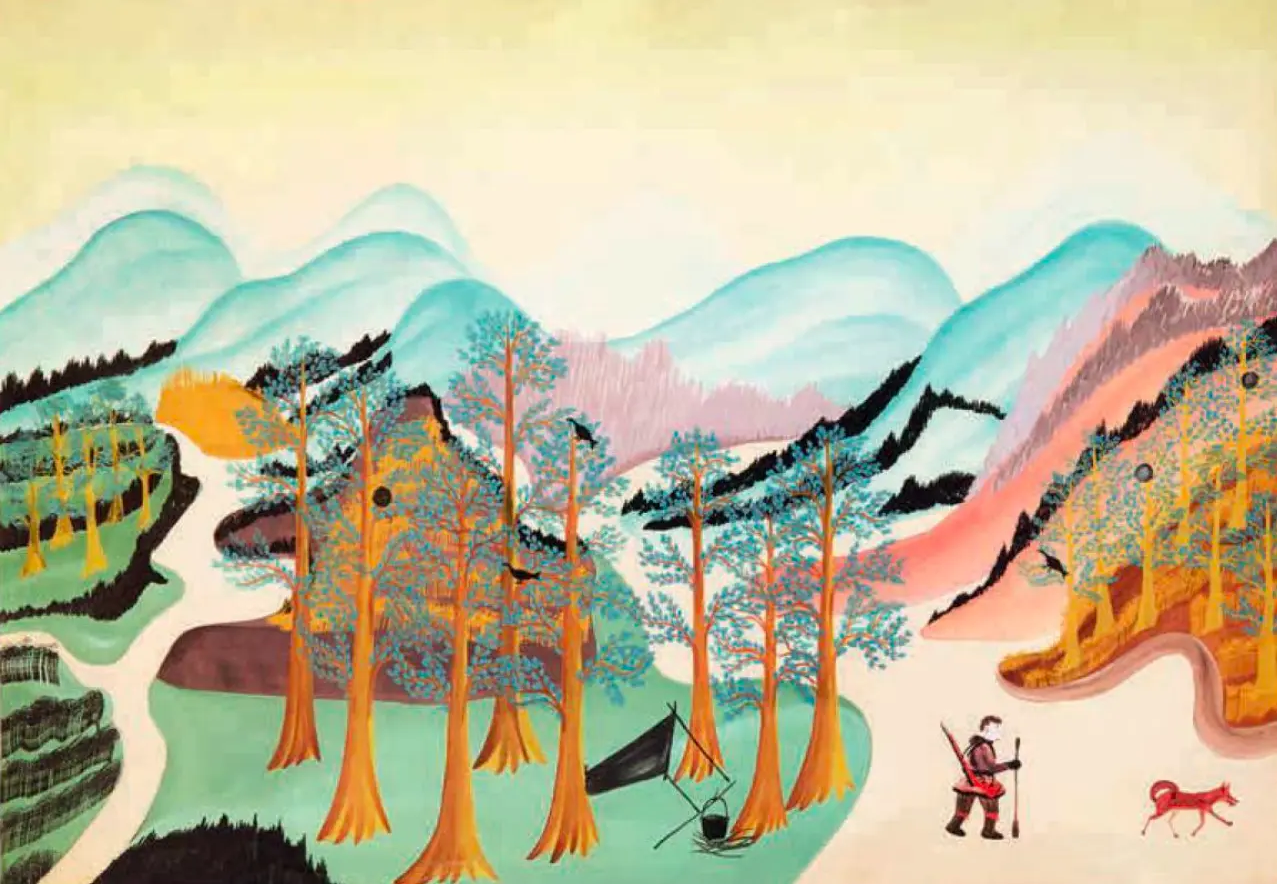
Hunter, 1930

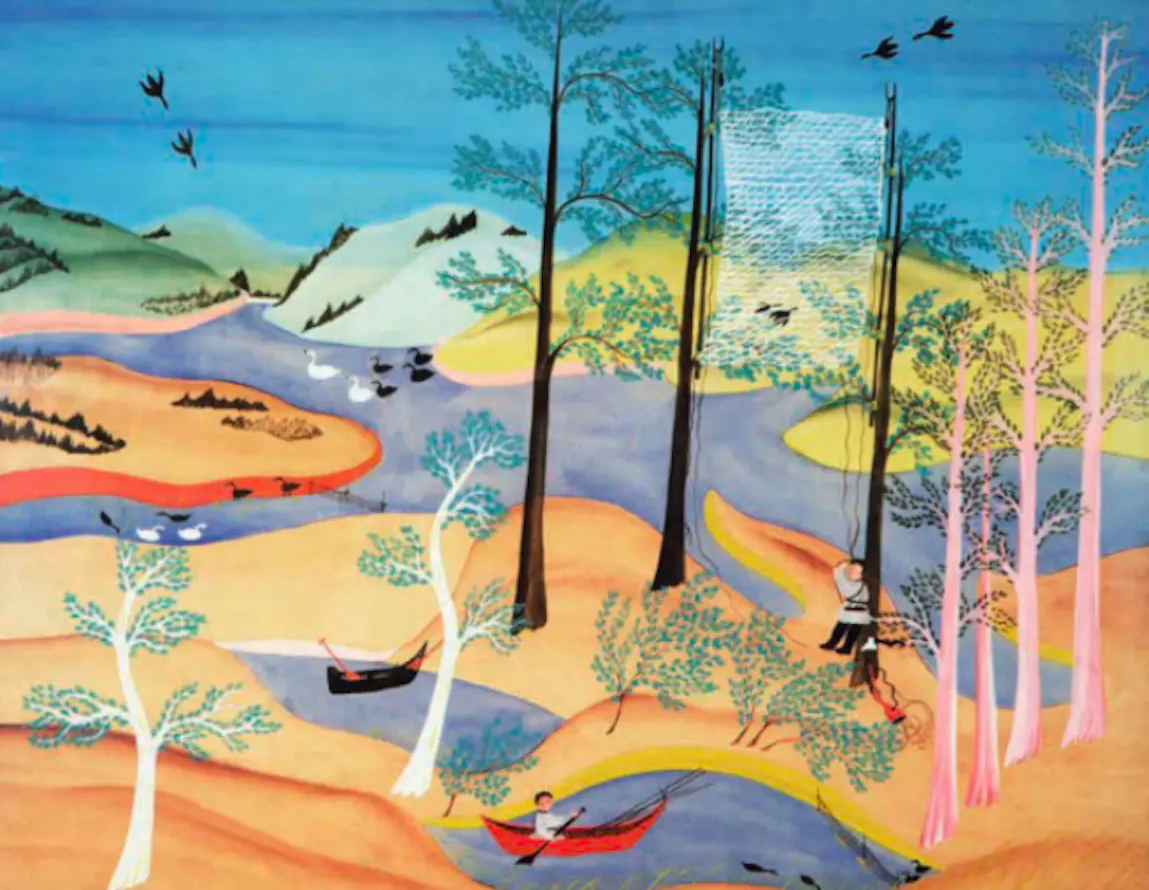
Catching Birds, 1939

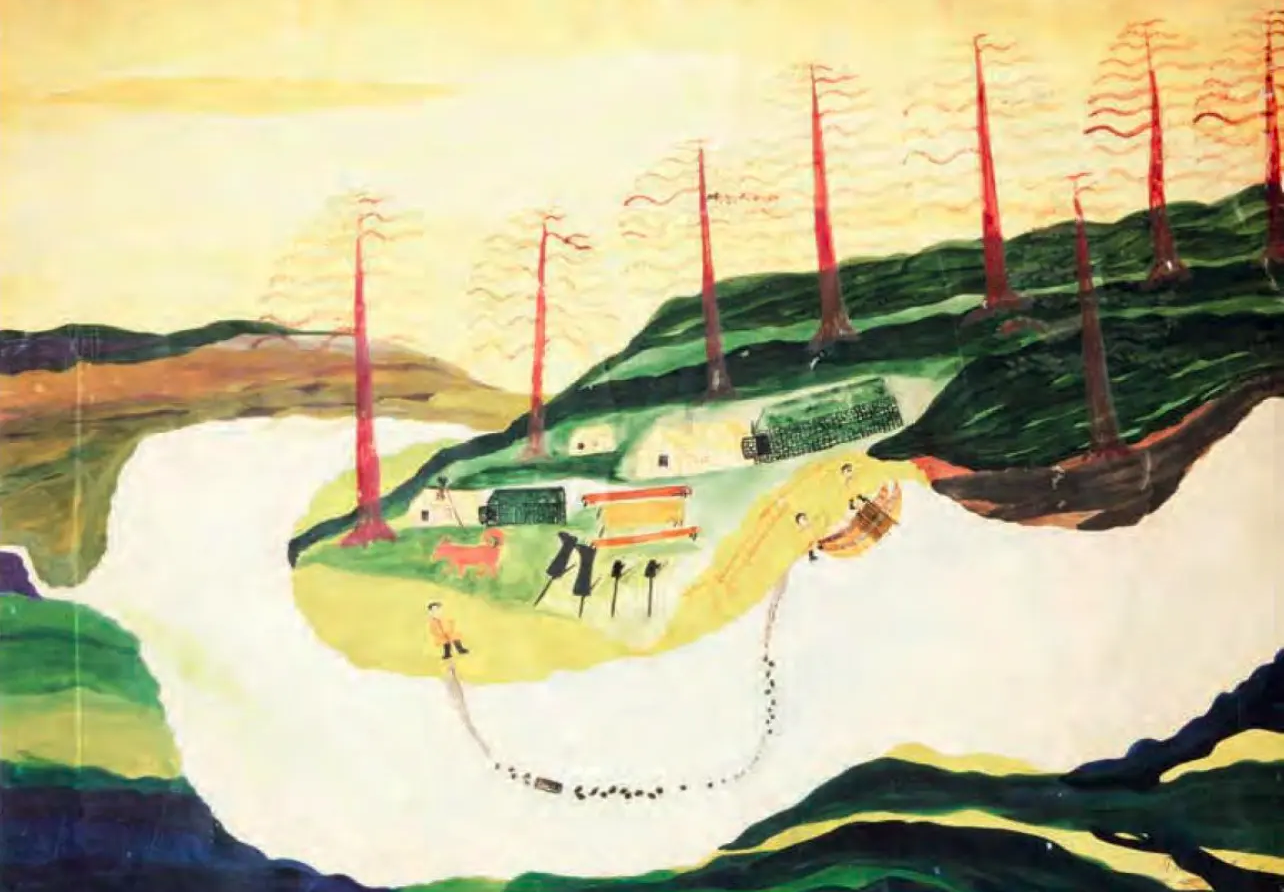
Fishing Collective Farm, 1936

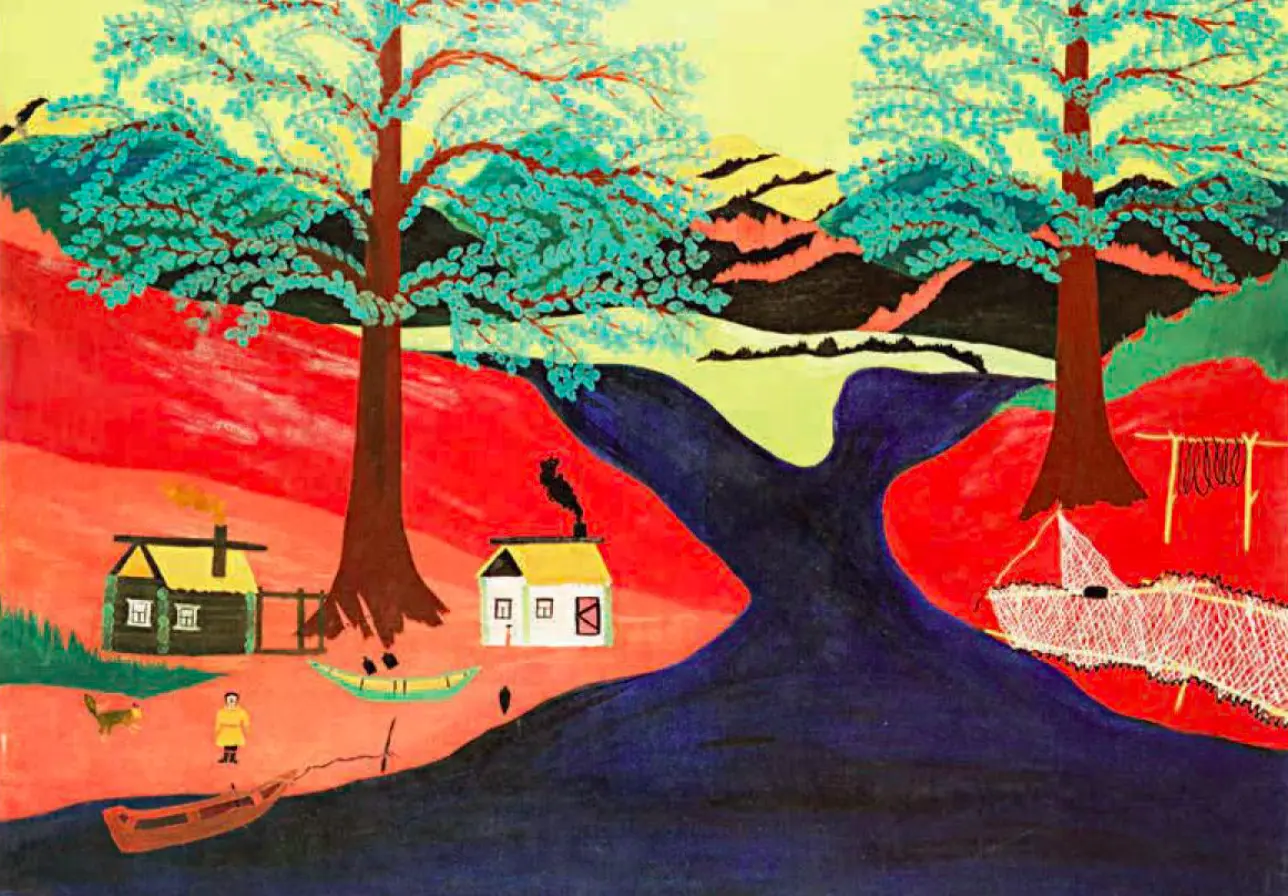
Fisherman's Village, 1936
