= Siberian minorities in the Soviet era =

The formation of the Soviet Union corresponded to a drastic re-structuring of the lives of many of the indigenous peoples of Siberia. The Soviet vision was often not compatible with tribal life, and many changes were enacted upon the native framework. This process is often called "Sovietization." It is a type of acculturation using political influence. In the success of such a process, the result is neither total assimilation nor total acculturation. National groups have a political identity and operate inside of the Moscow political structure yet maintain aspects of their culture. In practice however, reactions to such policies garnered a wide spectrum of reactions, with some groups in support and others in opposition. The new Soviet lifestyle made it "illegal for individuals to own means of production, exchange and communication."

== Ending exploitation ==
Several attempts were made to stop foreign exploitation of native industries, in particular the fur trade. In 1917, the fur tax was abolished, and efforts were made to stop price exploitation by private fur traders. Traditionally discriminatory practices, such as forced marriages and the bride price were also eliminated during Soviet re-structuring.

== Anti-shamanism ==
Russian officials strongly opposed the practice of shamanism and the concept of shamans as religious leaders. Shamans were religious conservatives and responsible for general resistance to Soviet reform (doctors, schools, collectivization). They were also responsible for assisting White supporters who fled after the Russian Civil War, which sparked Soviet anger. The shamans felt a strong need to protect the native way of life: shamanism had long provided a sense of communal solidarity. Such solidarity was now used to unite the community against the Soviets for trying to force change. Indeed, the Soviets were afraid of the shamans, because of the communal influence they wielded. Shamans were able to incite violent resistance, for example the Kazym rebellion. However, anti-religious policies eventually gained some traction, without complete success. In the case of the Khanty people, Marjorie Balzer writes that, "The scientific materialism of Soviet officialdom has gained limited acceptance without successfully supplanting Khanty spirituality." Rituals are still performed for religion's sake, though Soviet officials claim that such rituals are completely secular. Soviet replacements of shamanistic practices were not successful, because they were not presented as an acceptable alternative. Secular rituals were not rooted in native traditions: they carried Russian roots and Russian aims, which were often perceived as insincere. Thus, these policies produced an outward accommodation rather than actual change. On the other hand, shamanism in the modern day has experienced a severe decline, as the community has begun to perceive of shamanism as "bad." This perception reveals the effect that past policies have finally effected: a fear of the political power of shamans and the turmoil they were able to create.

== Collectivization ==
Collectivization was the policy to reduce nomadic lifestyles and force development of sedentary occupations. National groups were clustered into collectives, which were composed of a cluster of villages centered around a main outpost. The collective center was built usually on a river inlet to facilitate ease of access. The goal was that the outlying villages would no longer become necessary: native groups would ideally be attracted to the consumer goods of the center and the lifestyle it presented. The 1930s brought the introduction of the culture base, a type of collective center. It was supposed to be a model of the new Soviet life and the comforts one could enjoy as part of that lifestyle. The base had an air strip, state stores, a hospital, party headquarters and even a community center. Russian-style houses served as model for native peoples to emulate.

Tribal lands were forcibly "donated" for the advancement of the Soviet cause. This land was divided into hunting/herding areas, fishing sections and specific slaughtering points, often for reindeer. After being placed in the collective, indigenous peoples were redistributed to manage these areas, with an emphasis on food production to support the increase in urban population. The collective divided members into two types of workers: sovkhoz and kolkhoz. The sovkhoz were members that earned wages, for example reindeer breeders. The kolkhoz were members that shared in the profits, for example fishermen, whose profits oscillated depending on the season. Families were forced to rely on subsistence activities applied in a sedentary format: limited hunting, fishing, occasionally planting gardens. Some families were allowed to own individual stocks of cattle, reindeer and horses. This individual stock ownership allowed for the creation of a secondary economy under the radar of the Soviet system. For example, fishing brigades would make a small profit selling caviar to visitors. Reindeer breeding was allowed, being of substantial use to the Soviets, though it operated under the assumption that it would eventually be phased out. Reindeer breeders were perceived as primitive and uneducated, undesirable for the Soviet structure. Despite mistreatment of the reindeer herds and attempts to phase out the practice, it underwent a revival in the 1970s, as improved veterinary practices and the use of helicopters for transportation facilitated better herd management.

The collectives also instituted a policy of mandatory education as an exchange for the continuation of traditional life. Reindeer breeders were allowed to return to a semi-nomadic state in exchange for school-age children to attend 8 years of boarding school in the collective center. Officials hoped that better education might encourage a rejection of traditional values and occupations in favor the more-developed Soviet style. The schools were often very crowded and not in the best condition. In the 1950s and 1960s, a resettlement program forced outlying families to move closer to the collective center, in order to make it easier for school attendance and reduce the burden on the boarding system. However, this move meant that land was no longer available for traditional occupations, forcing indigenous groups to participate in "modern" jobs. The education system was used to enforce the progression of the Russian language as dominant. Schools would often begin instruction in the language of the local indigenous group and rapidly switch over to Russian. Native languages were sometimes taught as secondary subjects. The 1979 census showed a dramatic increase in the number of people who used Russian as a second language. This was likely the result of the forced education policy but potentially a sign that indigenous groups had decided to work with the system instead of against it. Russian leadership of the collective was usually resented, and a knowledge of the Russian language facilitated involvement in the collective command structure.

== Industrial development ==
The discovery of oil and gas in Siberia placed the region in an unusual spotlight. Renewed interest in the development of the region did not do much to improve the quality of native life. Oil and gas operations meant the further displacement of native peoples. They lacked the technical skills to participate in the industry: officials had not consistently encouraged it. Instead, trained technicians were imported to Siberia, removing the possibility for native involvement and creating further urban population growth. Oil and gas producers took advantage of Native groups' lack of desire to become involved, to perpetuate more exploitation.

== Border division ==
Outside the collective structure, the Soviets attempted to institute a larger system of ethnic organization. In the 1920s, the oblast/okrug system was used to divide the Soviet Union into smaller provinces. Inside the larger oblasts were often autonomous okrugs: regions where native groups could freely exist. This however did not adequately solved the widespread division of nomadic peoples, and on 30 July 1930, the oblast system was dissolved. The Soviets rejected the idea of a single national majority with internal minorities, which was seen as a capitalist model. In the next development phase, they tried to create an overarching federal structure with a large number of national territories.

This strategy was called ethno-territorial proliferation.

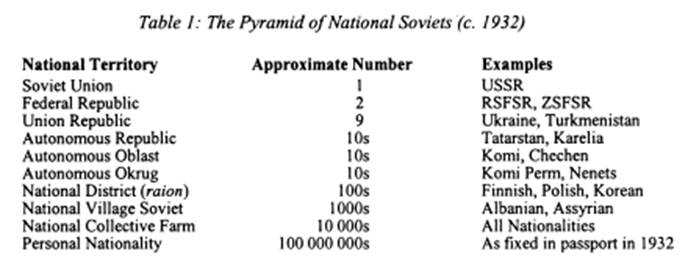
A breakdown of the National Soviet System

National-territorial units were expanded into smaller and smaller units called national soviets. The structure resembled a pyramid, with the number of units growing until reaching the bottom layer, the individual, with a fixed national identity. Tens of thousands of national borders were drawn and re-drawn, forcing everyone to choose a national identity and a set territory corresponding to that identity. This caused a large amount of ethnic conflict. Minorities wanted national soviets, yet even after this division, often remained the minority in a national soviet belonging to another group. The majority of such a soviet did not look kindly on its minority and often actively tried to expel them, by any means possible.

Inside these national soviets, efforts were made to unite the national group and Russians living in the territory. Though active resistance against the Russians was small, both Russians and native groups self-segregated, living in ethnic neighborhoods in the collective center. Russians attempted to isolate themselves just as much the natives, through intermarriage and ethnically homogeneous villages.
