= Sergei Vinogradov (painter) =

Russian painter

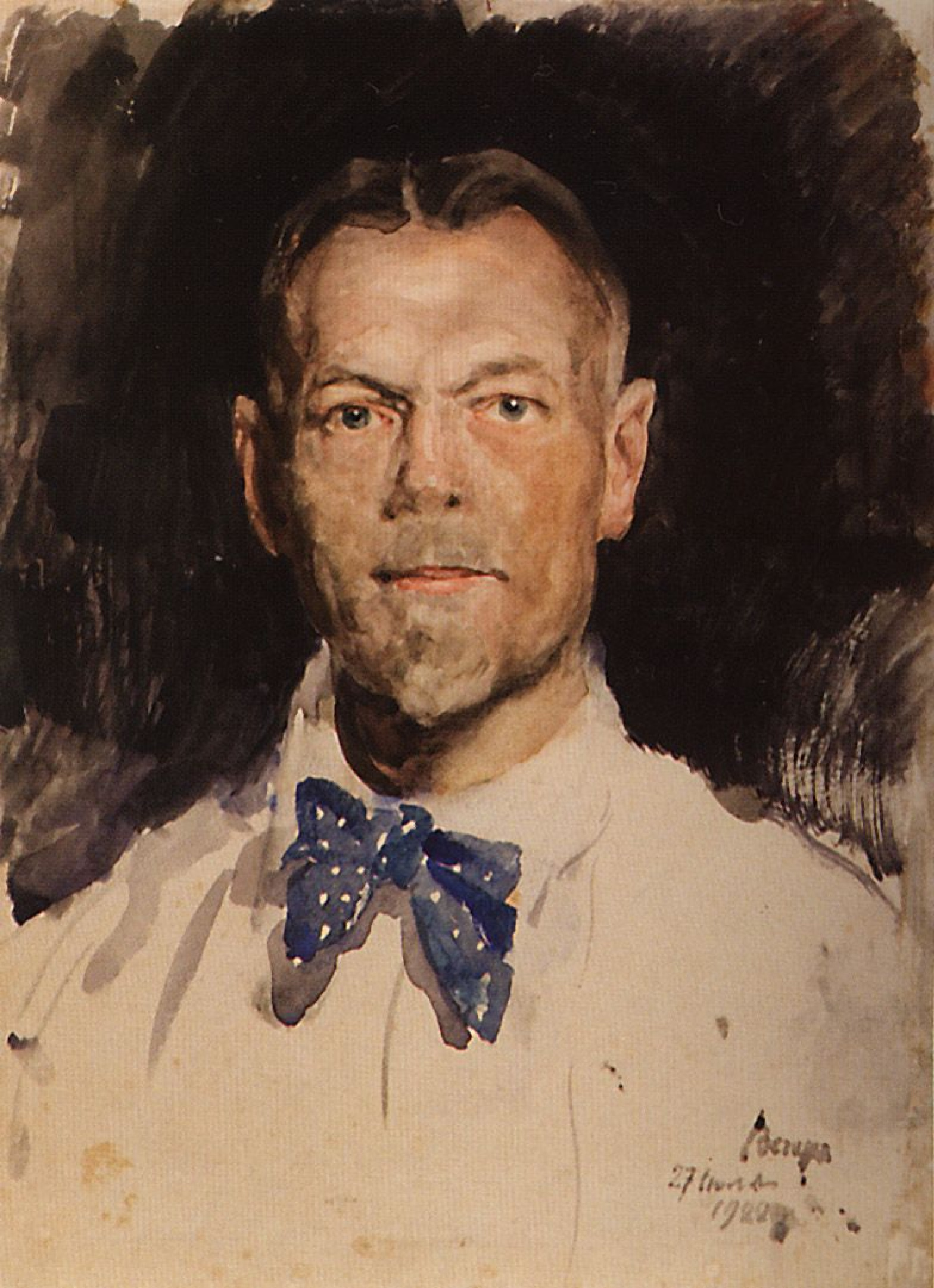
- Self-portrait (1922)
- Born: 1 July 1869; Nekrasovskoye
- Died: 5 February 1938 (aged 68); Riga
- Education: Member Academy of Arts (1912)
- Alma mater: Moscow School of Painting, Sculpture and Architecture
- Known for: Painting
- Style: Impressionism
- Movement: Peredvizhniki

Sergei Arsenievich Vinogradov (Russian: Сергей Арсеньевич Виноградов; 1869–1938) was a Russian-Soviet Impressionist painter; known for landscapes, genre scenes and interiors.

== Biography ==
His father was a rural priest. From 1880 to 1889, he studied at the Moscow School of Painting, Sculpture and Architecture with Illarion Pryanishnikov, Vladimir Makovsky and Vasily Polenov, who had a major influence on his style. In 1888, he was awarded the title of "Artist". The following year, he transferred to the Imperial Academy of Arts; studying with Bogdan Willewalde and Carl Wenig.

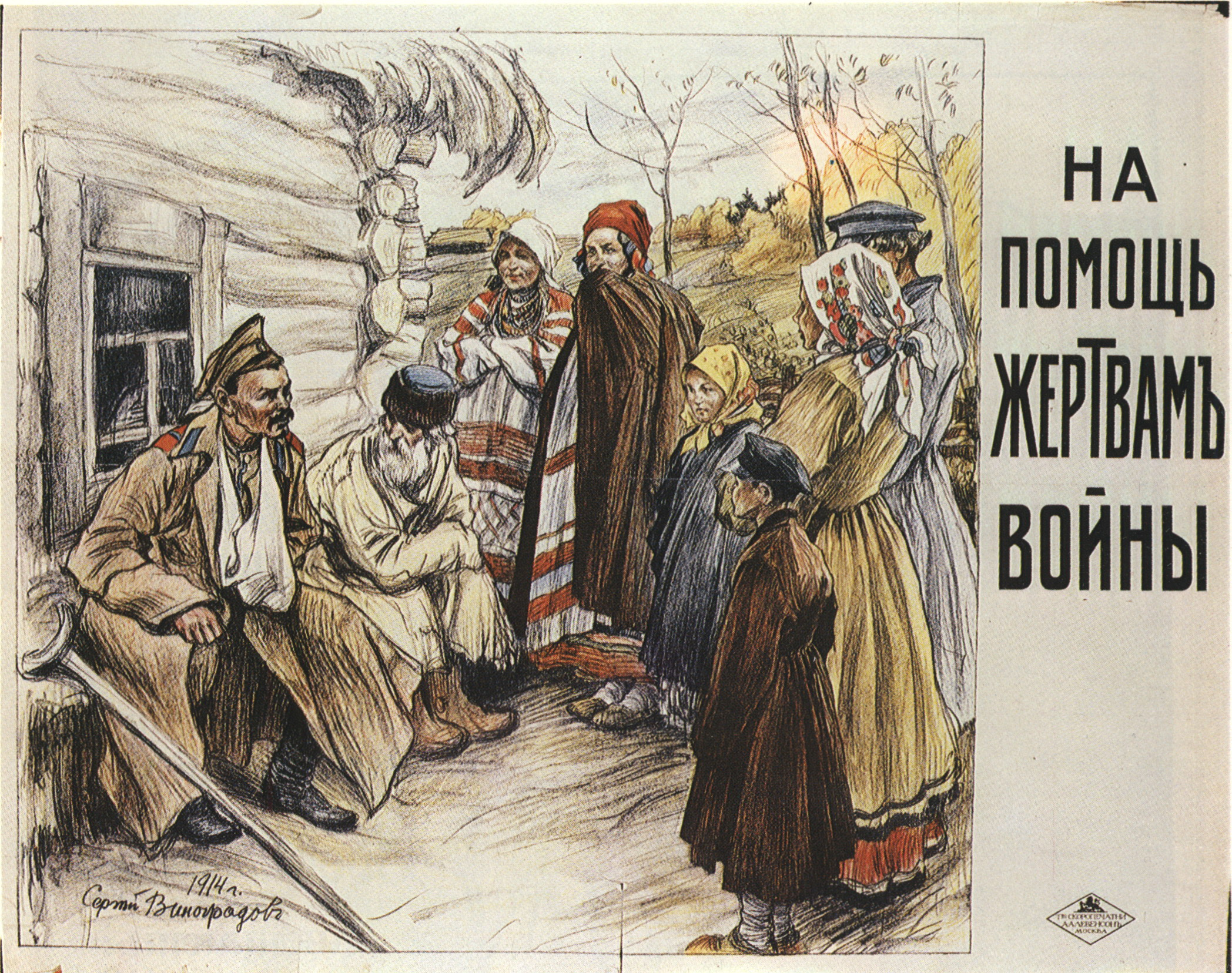
War Poster from 1914, encouraging people to support wounded soldiers

After graduating he went to Kharkiv to teach at a trade school. He returned to Moscow in 1896 and found work providing illustrations for the publisher Alexei Stupin. In 1896, he became a teacher at the Stroganov Moscow State University of Arts and Industry (a position he would hold until 1913). Two years later, he began exhibiting with the Peredvizhniki. In 1903, he became one of the founders of the "Union of Russian Artists". He was named an "Academician" in 1912 and became a member of the Academy in 1916.

During World War I, he lived in Gurzuf at a dacha owned by Konstantin Korovin. While there, he focused on painting military scenes and designing posters. After the war, he helped to decorate the Moscow Kremlin, on the occasion of the first anniversary of the Bolshevik Revolution.

In 1923, he helped organize a travelling exhibition of Russian art and accompanied the exhibition to its first showing in New York. Upon his return, he settled in Riga, where he initially taught at the studios of Nikolai Bogdanov-Belsky, then established his own private school.

Although he concentrated on landscapes at that time, he also worked in other genres; notably a series of portraits depicting the priests at Nativity Cathedral. In the early 1930s, he wrote a series of memoirs about the pre-revolutionary Russian art scene which were published in Segodnya. He died of pneumonia in 1938.

== Selected paintings ==
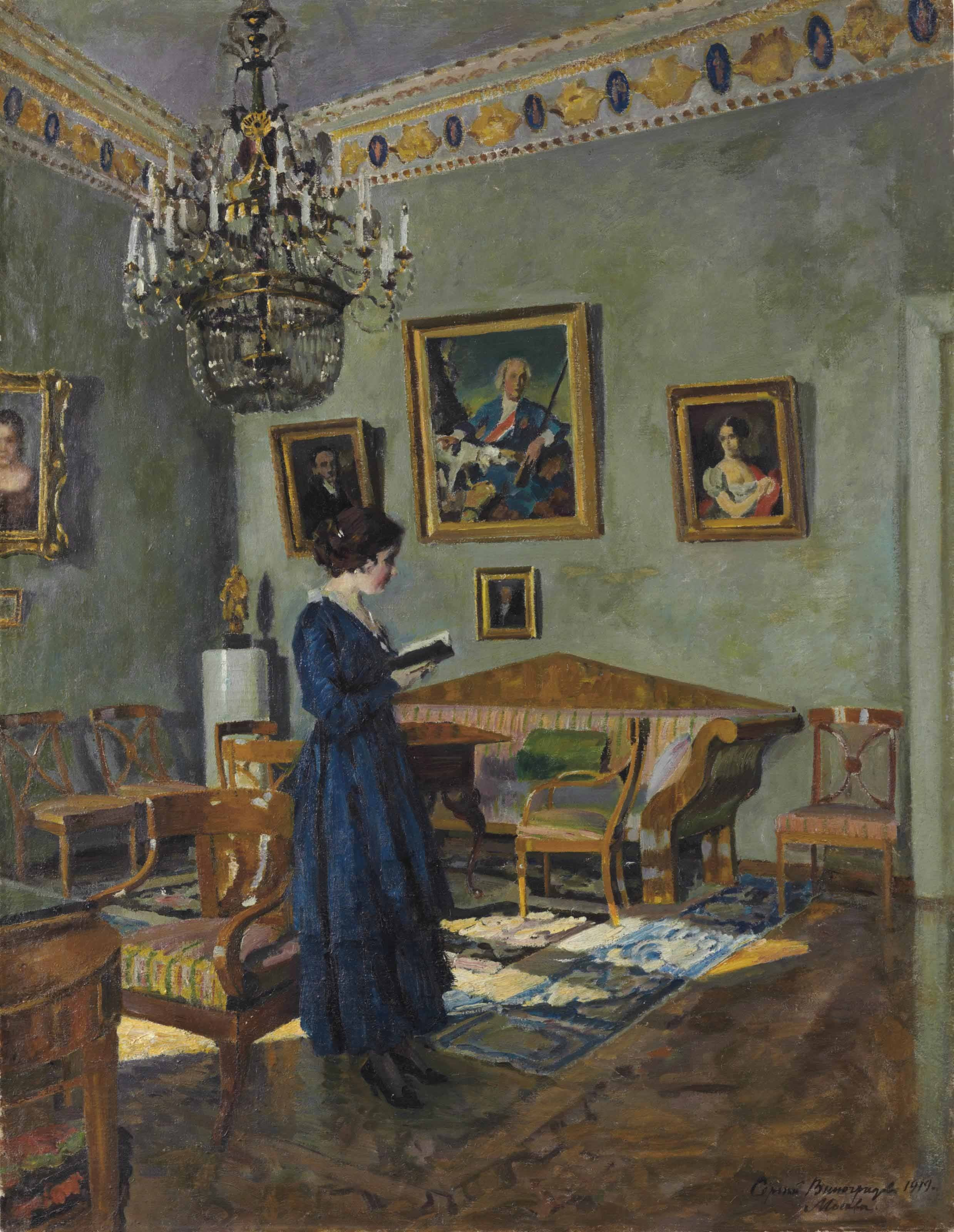
Young Woman Reading

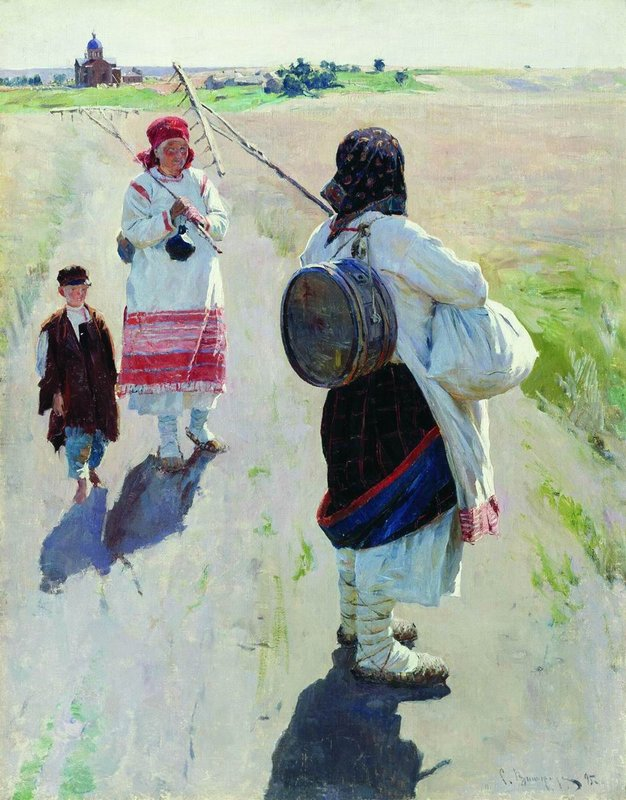
Going to Work

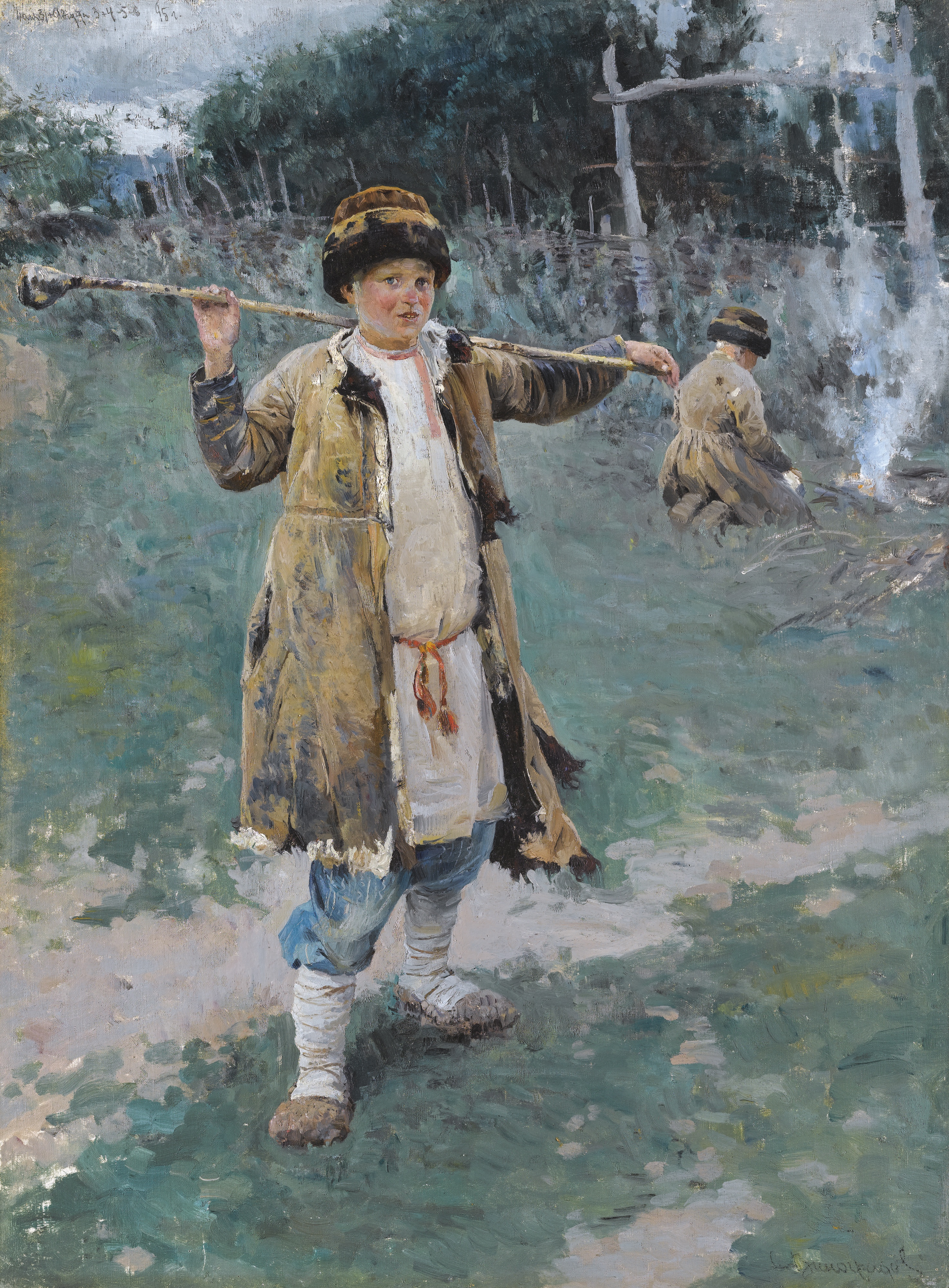
Village boys

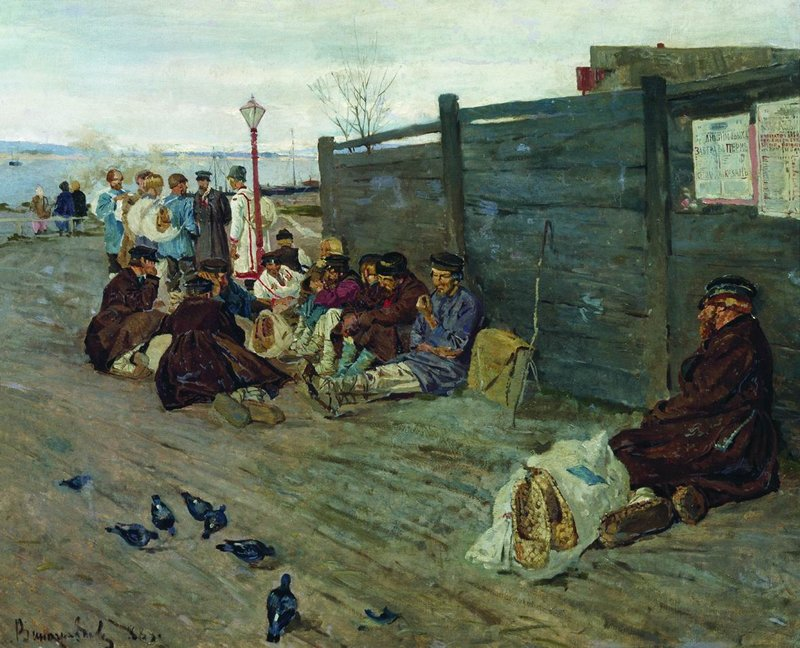
Waiting for the Ferry

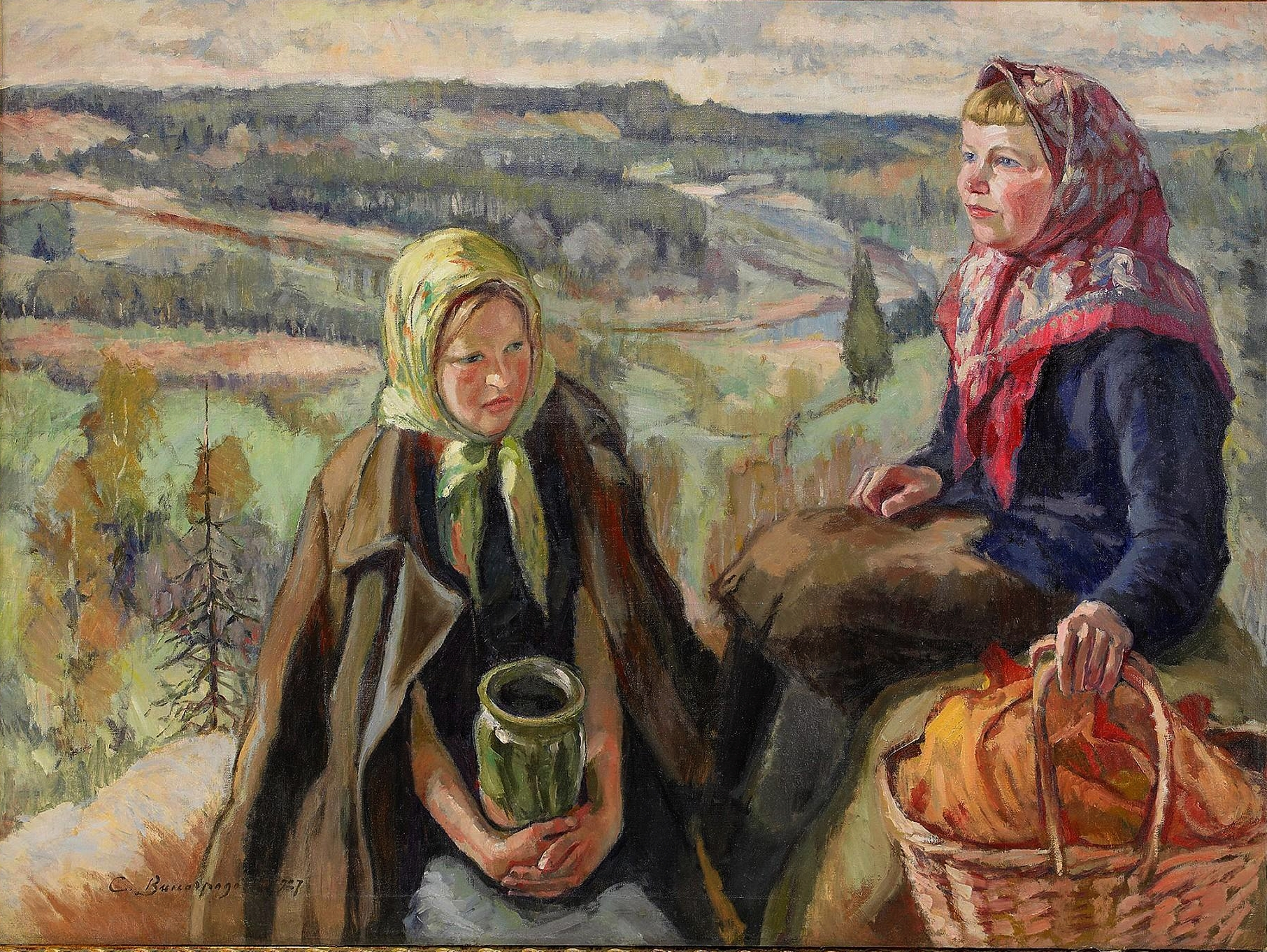
Village Girls
