= Koibal language =

Koibal language may refer to:

- Koibal dialect (Samoyedic), an extinct Samoyedic language or dialect of Kamas
- Koibal dialect (Turkic), a dialect of the Khakas language, a modern Turkic language, was having ISO code zkb but merged into Khakas (kjh) in 2023
- Koibalkyshtym language, an extinct Yeniseian language
