= Koibal =

Koibal may refer to:

- Koibal people
- Koibal language:
  - The Koybal dialect of the Khakas language, a modern Turkic language.
  - The Koibal dialect of the Kamassian language, an extinct Samoyedic language.
