= Mator language =

Extinct Samoyedic language

Mator
- Motor, Mator-Taigi-Karagas
- Native to: Russia
- Region: northern Sayan Mountains
- Ethnicity: Mators, possibly also Soyots, Karagas
- Extinct: 1839
- Language family: Uralic: Samoyedic; Mator
- Dialects: Mator; Taygi; Karagas

Language codes
- ISO 639-3: mtm
- Glottolog: mato1250 Mator-Taigi-Karagas nucl1288 Nuclear Mator
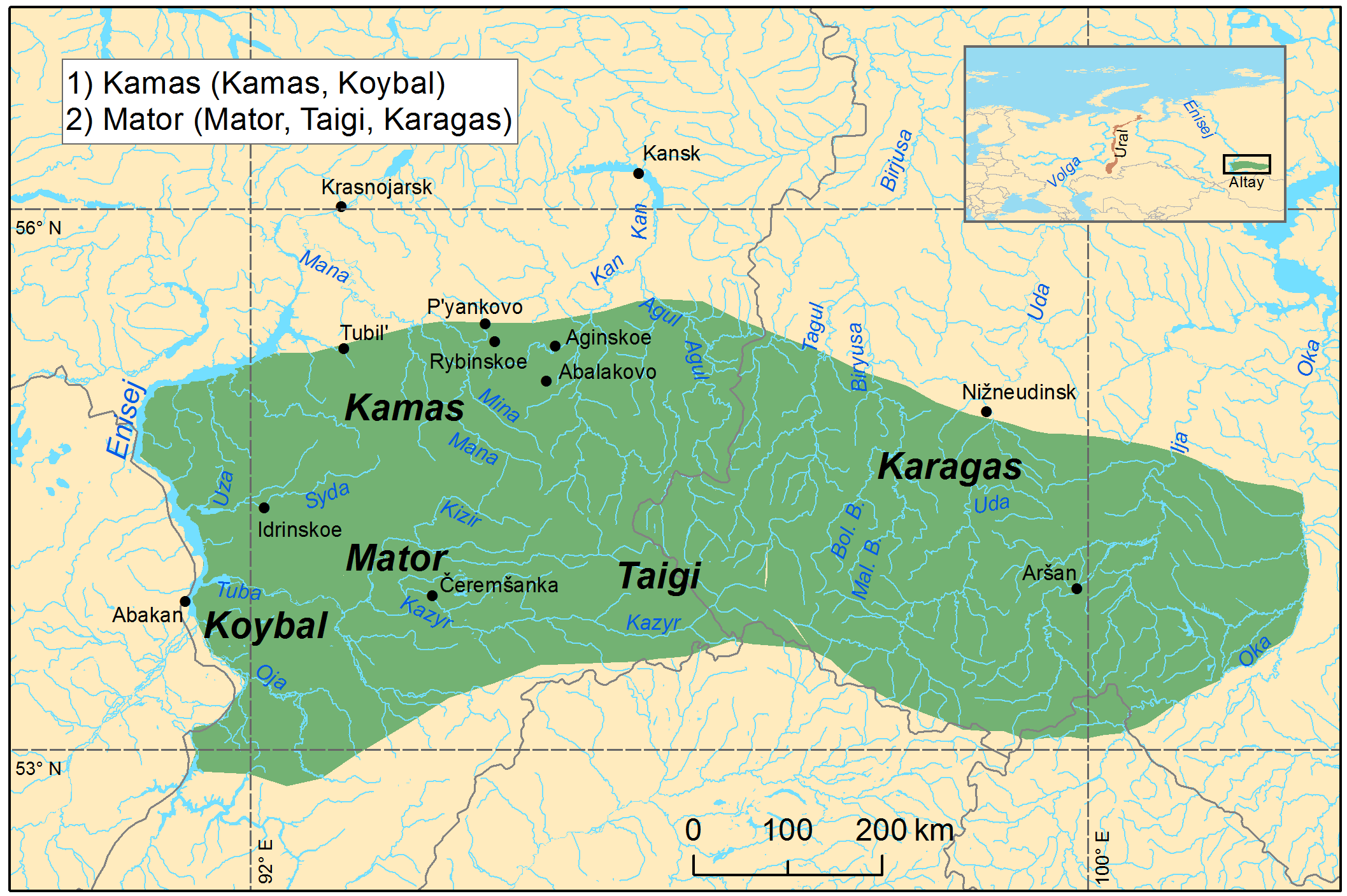
- Traditional distribution of the extinct Sayan Samoyedic languages including Mator‍‍

Mator or Motor is an extinct Samoyedic language, extinct since around 1839. It was spoken in the northern region of the Sayan Mountains in Siberia, close to the Mongolian north border. The speakers of Mator, Matorians or Mators, lived in a wide area from the eastern parts of the Minusinsk District ( okrug ) along the Yenisei River to the region of Lake Baikal. Three dialects of Mator were recorded: Mator proper as well as Taygi and Karagas (occasionally portrayed as separate languages, but their differences are few). Mator was influenced by Mongolic, Tungusic and Turkic languages before it went extinct, and may have even been possibly influenced by the Iranic languages.‍ It went extinct as a result of the Mator people shifting linguistically to the related Kamas language or nearby Altaic-sprachbund languages, like Buryat, Soyot, Khakas, Evenki and Tatar.‍

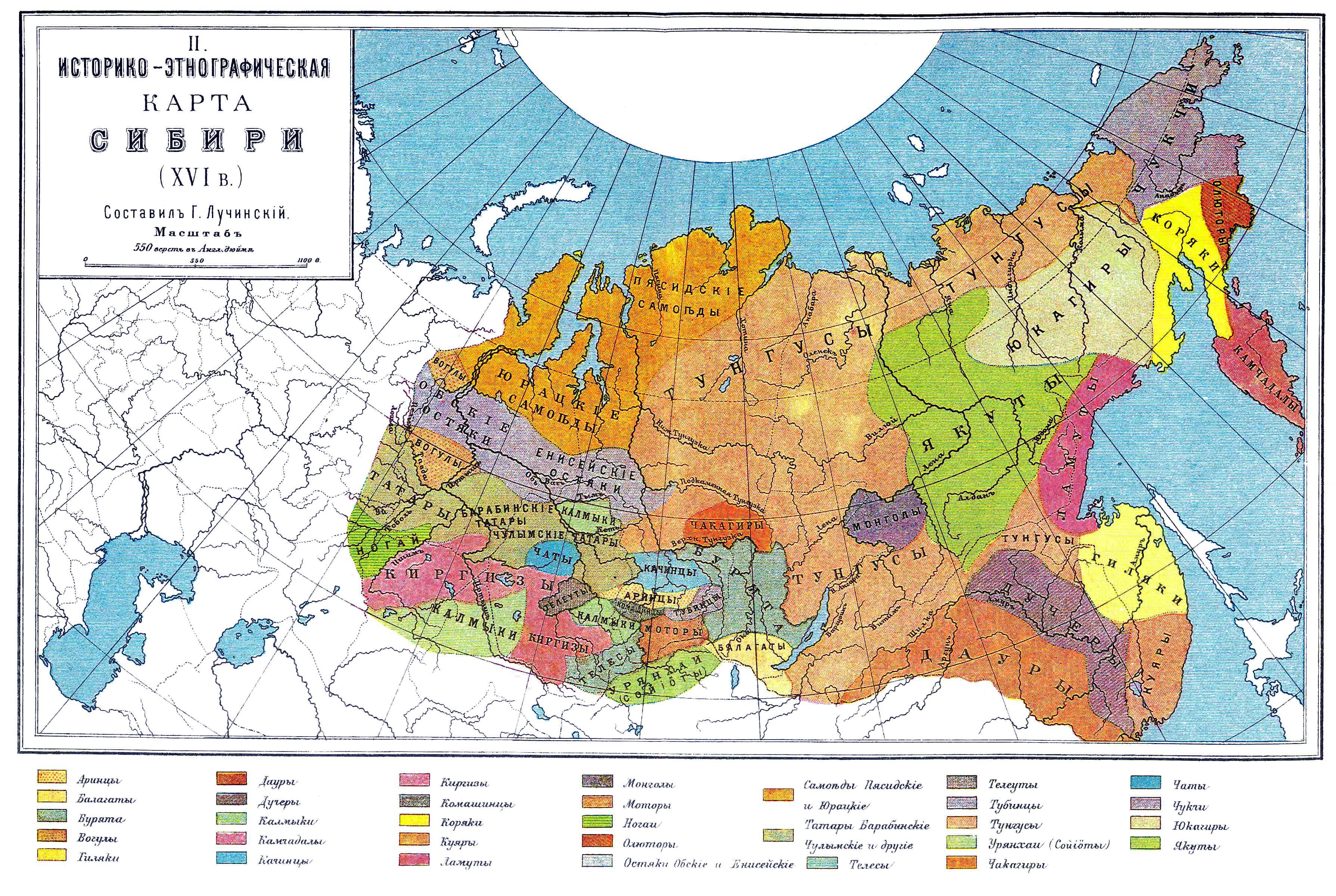
A map of Siberian peoples in the 16th century with the Mators in orange, near the bottom-center of the map.

Today the term "Mator people" is simply a name of a seok of the Koibal, one of the five territorial sub-division groups of the Khakas. (Note that the name "Koibal" likewise derives from the related Samoyedic Koibal language).

Mator has been frequently grouped together with Selkup and Kamassian as "South Samoyedic". This is however a grouping by geographical area, and not considered to constitute an actual sub-branch of the Samoyedic languages.

== Phonology ==
=== Consonants ===
Mator consonants
		Bilabial	Dental/ Alveolar	Palatal	Velar	Glottal
Plosive	voiceless	(p)	t	t͡ʃ	k	ʔ
Plosive	voiced	b	(d)	(d͡ʒ)	(ɡ)	
Fricative	voiceless		s	(ʃ)	h	
Fricative	voiced		(z)	(ʒ)		
Nasal		m	n	ɲ	ŋ	
Rhotic			r			
Approximant	central			j		
Approximant	lateral		l			

=== Vowels ===
Mator vowels
		Front		Central	Back
		unrounded	rounded	Central	Back
Close	short	i	y	(ɨ)	u
Close	long	iː	yː	(ɨː)?	uː
Mid	short	e	ø	ə	o
Mid	long	eː	øː?	əː	oː
Open	short	æ		a	
Open	long	æː		aː	
Reduced		e̽			

== Lexicon ==
Below are some Mator words from Helimski 1997.‍

kälä
fish
mondoh
root
sörüh
rain
kaduh
storm
baada
word
kaasa
human
ämdä
horn
täjbä
nail
täär
divide, share
köhö
winter
öröh
autumn
teite
four
mən
me, I
tən
you
ter
hair
ajba
head
siime
eye

== Bibliography ==
- Helimski, Eugen (1997). Die Matorische Sprache: Wörterbuch – Grundzüge der Grammatik – Sprachgeschichte [The Mator Language: Dictionary – Principles of Grammar – Language History] (PDF). Studia Uralo-Altaica [Uralic-Altaic Studies] (in German). Vol. 41. University of Szeged. ISBN 9630481-881-1. Archived (PDF) from the original on 29 January 2021.
