= Kamasins =

Tribe in Russia

Kaŋmažə

Total population
- 21 (2021)

Regions with significant populations
- Russia

Languages
- Kamas (historically); Khakas (Kamas Turk); Russian

Related ethnic groups
- Other Samoyeds, Koibals

The Kamasins (Russian: камасинцы, romanized: kamasintsy; Kamassian: Kaŋmažə) are a collection of tribes of Samoyedic peoples in the Sayan Mountains who lived along the Kan River and Mana River in the 17th century in the southern part of today's Krasnoyarsk Krai.

In the 2010 and 2021 Russian censuses, two people identified as Kamassian and listed under the subgroup "other nationalities". Also, 21 people, comprising 0.5% of the population of Sayansky District, are declared as Kamasins and their descendants by the district administration in the official tourist guide (2021).

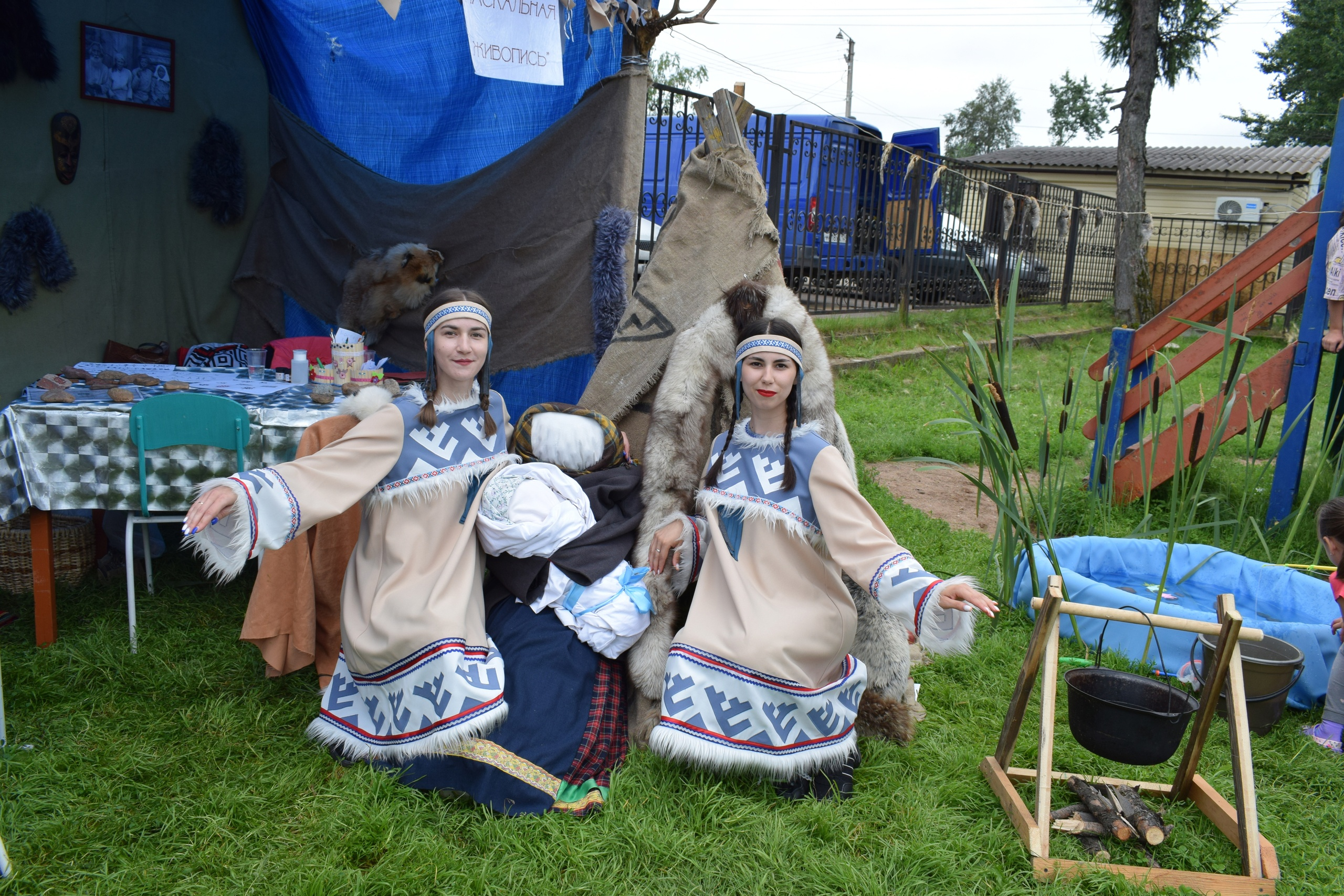
Kamassian settlement — the stand of the Uner rural locality at the Sayan Bird Fest, Aginskoye, July 2023

== History ==
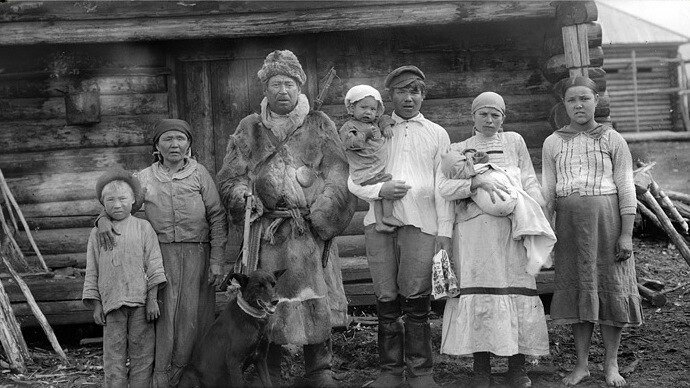
Kamassian family in Abalakovo village, 1925

The origins of the Kamasins remain obscure but it is believed that they are descended from Proto-Samoyed tribes. Around the 17th century, the Kamasins moved and settled along the Kan and Mana rivers. Later on the Kamasins were partly Turkicized.

=== The Taiga and Steppe Kamasins ===
In the late 19th century, the Kamasins were split into two groups: the Taiga and the Steppe Kamasins, each with their own distinct dialect.

The Taiga Kamasins engaged in hunting, reindeer breeding and fishing. The Taiga Kamasins spoke the Kamass dialect of Kamassian until the early 20th century.

The Steppe Kamasins engaged in cattle breeding, horse breeding, farming, and hunting. They spoke the Koibal dialect of Kamassian, a Samoyedic language, until they adopted the Khakas language in the mid-19th century, which is still used today.

=== Later history ===
Many of the Kamasins had assimilated into the Russian peasantry by the early 20th century. Other Kamasins were assimilated into the Koibal subgroup of the Khakass and underwent Turkification. The Kamasins are now ethnically classified as Koibal Khakass or Russian.

In 1989, Klavdiya Plotnikova, the last native speaker of the Kamassian language, died. She was half Kamassian.

== Population ==
Ago Künnap, in a 1999 essay on the Kamassian language, indicates that there are no more than 50 descendants of Kamasins.

In the All-Russian population censuses of 2010 and 2021, 2 people indicated being of Kamasin ethnicity.

The unified tourist passport of the Sayansky district of the Krasnoyarsk Krai (developed by the local administration in 2021) shows the ethnic composition of the district's population. 0.2% of the total population of 10,500 people (=21 people) are attributed to the Kamasins, the indigenous people.

== See also ==
- Kamassian language
- Klavdiya Plotnikova
- Koibals
