= Fuyu Kyrgyz =

Fuyu Kyrgyz may refer to:

- Fuyu Kyrgyz language, an endangered language spoken in China
- Fuyu Kyrgyz people, an ethnic group which lives in China
