= Abalakovo, Sayansky District, Krasnoyarsk Krai =

Abalakovo Абалаково
- Village
- Location within Krasnoyarsk Krai Location within Russia
- Coordinates: 55°04′N 94°49′E
- Country: Russia
- Region: Krasnoyarsk Krai
- District: Sayansky District
- Time zone: UTC+7:00

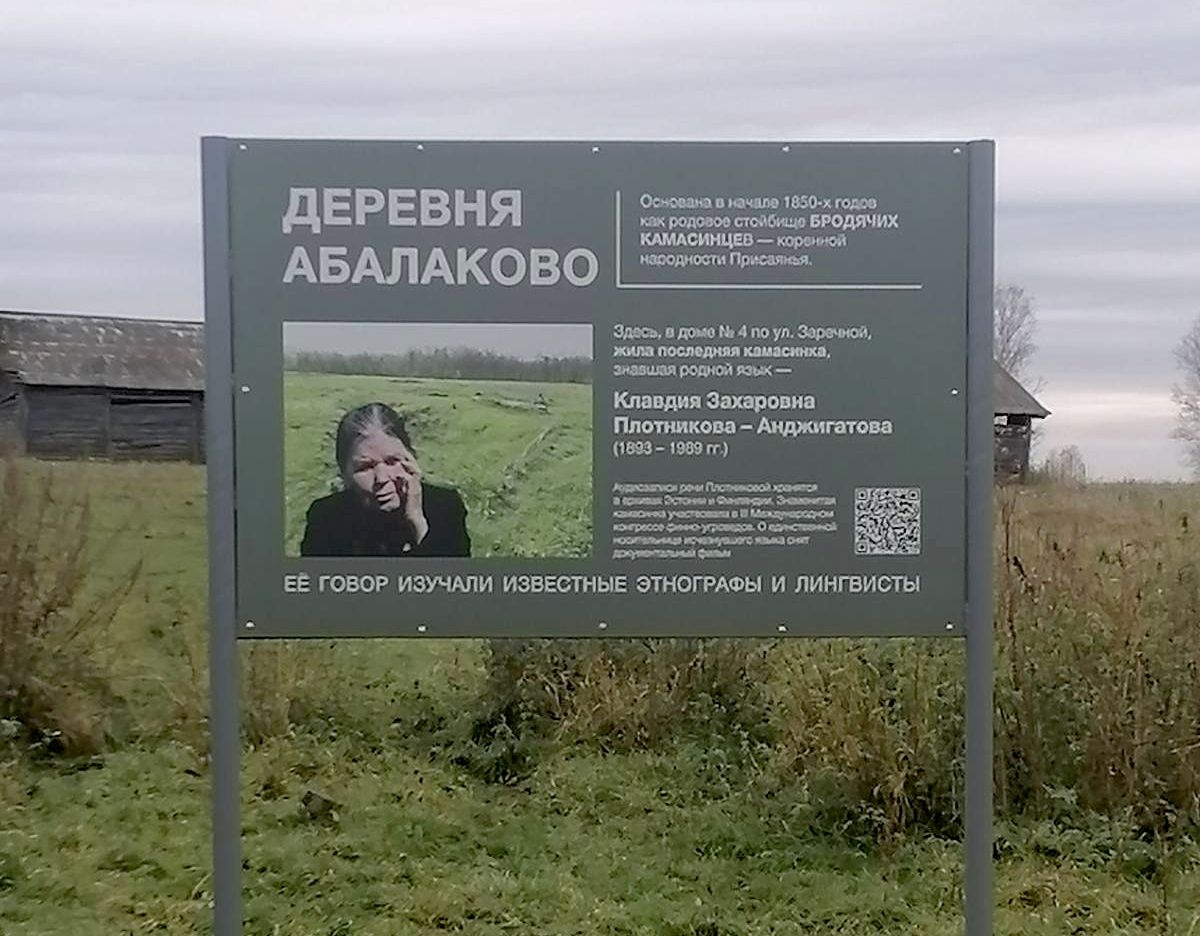
Information stand in Abalakovo about Klavdiya Plotnikova

Abalakovo (Russian: Абала́ково, Kamassian: Abalakovo) is a rural locality (a village) in Malinovskoye Rural Settlement of Sayansky District, Krasnoyarsk Krai, Russia. The population was 51 as of 2010. There are 4 streets. In 1964 Abalakovo was inhabited mainly by Russians and Ukrainians and by some Tatars and Kamasins. The last Kamassian native speaker (Klavdya Plotnikova) also lived in Abalakovo. In October 2023, in her honour an information stand was installed in Abalakovo by a group of enthusiasts at the initiative of the chairman of the Malinovskoye Rural Settlement.

== Geography ==
Abalakovo is located 30 km south of Aginskoye (the district's administrative centre) by road. Voznesenka is the nearest rural locality.
