= Kamas Turk language =

Dialect of Khakas

Kamas Turk
- Kamassian Turk
- Native to: Russia
- Region: Khakassia
- Ethnicity: Koibals, Kamasins
- Extinct: 2007-2010; 1,500 Koibal speakers (2016)
- Language family: Turkic: Common Turkic; Siberian Turkic; South Siberian; Yenisei Turkic; Khakas; Kamas Turk
- Dialects: Kamas †; Koibal

Language codes
- ISO 639-3: –
- Glottolog: kama1354
- Linguasphere: 44-AAB-djg
- Kamas Turk is classified as Extinct by the UNESCO Atlas of the World's Languages in Danger.

Kamas Turk or Kamassian Turk is a language or group of dialects of Khakas. It is spoken by the Koibals and the Kamasins. Kamas Turk developed when the Koibals and Kamasins transitioned from speaking Samoyedic Kamas and Koibal into Khakas.

== Dialects ==
Kamas Turk was separated into 2 separate dialects that are Koibal (Xoibal) and Kamas (Kamass, Kamassian). They both developed separately and are subsumed under Kamas Turk. Koibal is classified in the group of "hushing" dialects of Khakas with the Kachin, Kyzyl and Shor dialects.

== Status ==
According to the UNESCO Atlas of the World's Languages in Danger, Kamas Turk has gone extinct. However, Koibal has also been classified as endangered. In 2016, V. Borgoyakov stated that there are 1,500 people still speaking Koibal, which represents 2% of all Khakas speakers. However, the Koibal dialect could potentially go extinct within 2-3 decades.

== Phonology ==
The Koibal dialect has shown ancient Uralic and Samoyedic roots in its lexical units. The dialect also shares words with the Sagay dialect of Khakas, such as артым, which means river rapids.

== Words ==
The following are examples of words from Koibal:

English	Kamas Turk (Koibal)	Russian
childless	ассизеть	бездетный
door	аи	дверь
doll	кичек	кукла
elk	ка	лось
head	улу	голова
hornless	амнызеть	безрогий
insignificant	албан	незначительный
large (calf)	марго	крупный (теленок)
oscillatory motion, vibration	орбан	колебательное движение, колебание
sable	алда	соболь
sick	инзиде	больной
village	тирра	деревня
wild onion	ай II	полевой лук
woman	абы	женщина

== Sample ==
The following is a text of Koibal provided by Olga Anzhiganova:

Koibal:

"Топленай масланы хайылдырган хайах, ӱсте:н де: хайах тіфча:ла:р, хайзы хайылдыр салган, хайзы ӱстеп салган тіфча. Сметен потхы и:дівал, анаң ӱстӱне талган урувс, умурталган то:ладыс. Чичинала: умуртох тіфча, Чылтыгашефте:р, Миндибекофта:р олар умуртох тіфча:ла:р. Хыйманы пик арах тудуф, пик арах суғуф о:дыраға кирек, кӧмес суғуф, палғавзаға. Па:рды се:чке: начыфча:м."

English:

“Melted butter is called khayyldyrgan (lit. melted), and melted butter, some say (I) melted the butter, others—melted it. Make a sour cream potkhy, sprinkle talgan on top, talgan from umurta (bird cherry). The Chichintsy (residents of Chichiny) also say umurt, the Myltygashevs, Mindibekovs, they also call it umurt. Hold the khyyma (thick horse intestines) tightly, stuff it as strongly as possible (with meat), tie it. Chop the liver in a trough.”

== Bibliography ==
- Kaksin, Andrey (2020). Койбальский говор хакасского языка: к истории формирования и общей типологии (in Russian). Vestnik of Tuvan State University. pp. 34–40.
