= Bazaikha =

River in Krasnoyarsk Krai, Russia

Bazaikha База́иха
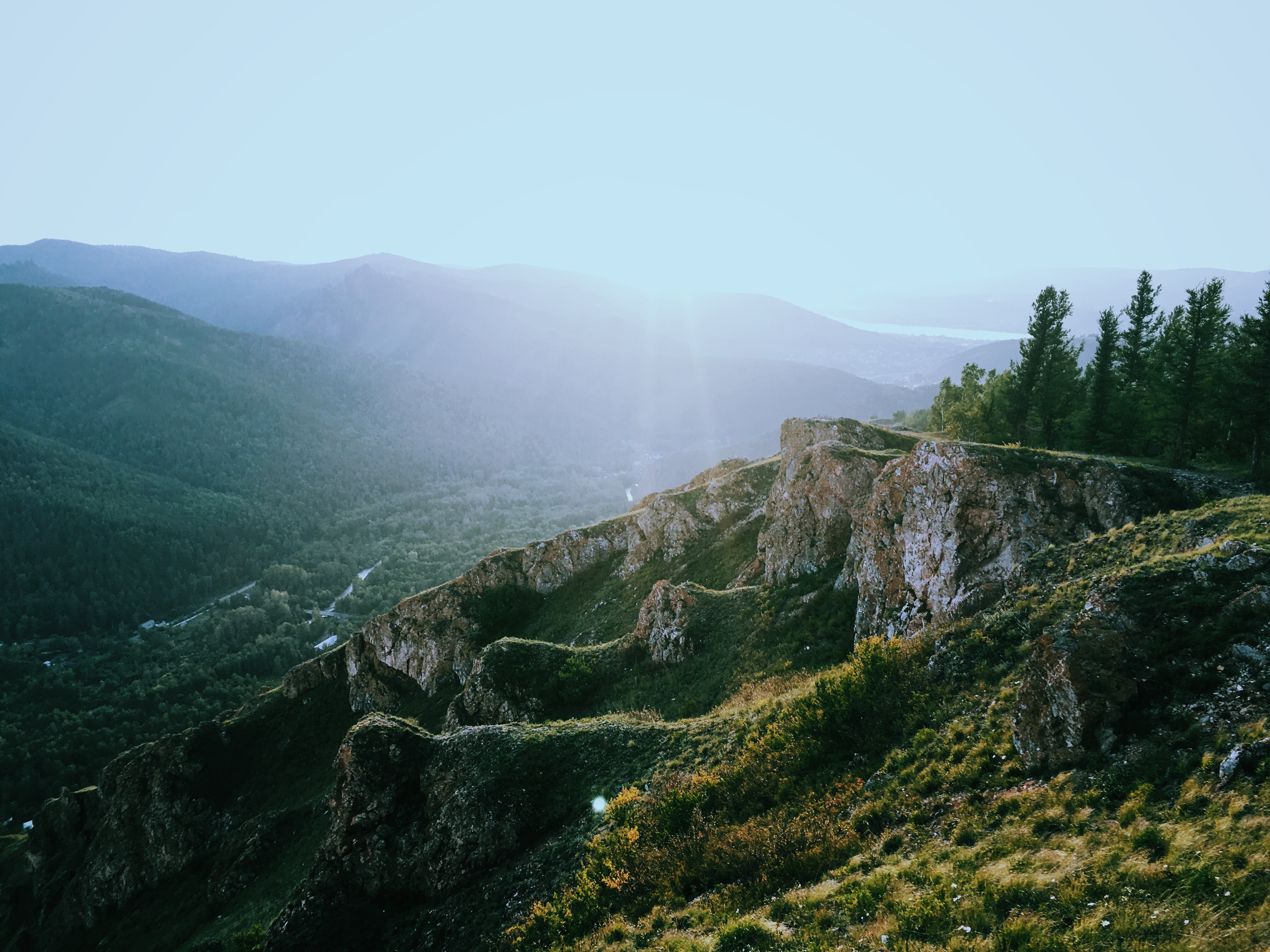
- View of a gorge in the Bazaikha

- Mouth location in Krasnoyarsk Krai, Russia

Location
- Country: Krasnoyarsk Krai, Russia

Physical characteristics
- Source
  - location: Eastern Sayan
  - coordinates: 55°31′54″N 93°36′49″E
  - elevation: ca 650 m (2,130 ft)
- Mouth: Yenisey
  - coordinates: 55°58′46″N 92°46′59″E
  - elevation: 139 m (456 ft)
- Length: 128 km (80 mi)
- Basin size: 1,000 km^{2} (390 sq mi)

Basin features
- Progression: Yenisey→ Kara Sea

The Bazaikha (Russian: База́иха) is a river in the Krasnoyarsk Krai. It is the third largest river in the Krasnoyarsk neighborhood after Yenisey and Mana. The name derived from the Kamassian bazaī-ďağa — iron river.

The length of the Bazaikha is 128 kilometres (80 mi) and the area of its basin is 21,700 square kilometres (8,400 mi^{2}).

== Course ==
Beginning in the Eastern Sayan mountains it flows west-northward without a contact with populated places until the very confluence with the Yenisey in the suburbs near the southwestern edge of the Krasnoyarsk city. The valley is mostly deep and winding with the banks covered with conifers.

== Tourism ==
Numerous resorts, dachas and cottages are built in the valley stretching for 14 kilometres (9 mi) inwards from the confluence. By the Yenisei, the village of Bazaikha is located in what is considered a part of Krasnoyarsk; it should not be confused with the railway station named Bazaikha which is 18 kilometres (11 mi) west of it.

The closest approach to the wild part of Bazaikha is from the villages of Beryozovskiy and Magansk.

== See also ==
- List of rivers of Russia
