= Abugach =

abugach

Total population
- assimilated into Koibals

Languages
- Turkic

Religion
- Islam

Related ethnic groups
- Other Samoyedic peoples

The Abugach (Russian: Abugachaev(tsy)) were a people from the region around the Ural Mountains and believed to have been of Samoyed ancestry. Witnesses from the 19th century, however, identify their spoken language as Turkic, as they were Turkicised. They numbered around 100 in 1859. Eventually, the Abugach became one of the ethnic groups that made up the Koibal sub-division of the Khakass, becoming one of the 7 uluses of the Koibal steppe duma.
