= Fuyu County, Heilongjiang =

Fuyu County 富裕县
- County
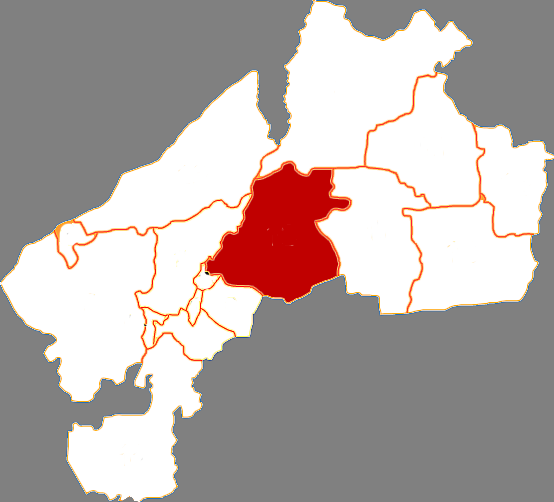

- Location in Heilongjiang
- Coordinates: 47°48′N 124°28′E
- Country: People's Republic of China
- Province: Heilongjiang
- Prefecture-level city: Qiqihar

Area
  - Total: 4,335 km^{2} (1,674 sq mi)

Population (2010)
  - Total: 276,537
  - Density: 63.79/km^{2} (165.2/sq mi)
- Time zone: UTC+8 (China Standard)

Fuyu (Chinese: 富裕; pinyin: Fùyù) is a county of western Heilongjiang province, China, under the administration of Qiqihar City. Various economic crops and the milk are produced in the fertile land. The county has an area of 4,026 square kilometres (1,554 sq mi), and has a population of approximately 300,000 inhabitants, per a 2023 government publication.

== Toponymy ==
Fuyu County is named after the nearby Wuyur River, which derives from a Jurchen word for waterlogged depression. The county's name been transcribed into Chinese in a number of different ways, such as Wuyur (Chinese: 乌裕尔; pinyin: Wūyù'ěr), Huyur (Chinese: 呼裕尔; pinyin: Hūyù'ěr), Huyur (Chinese: 瑚裕尔; pinyin: Húyù'ěr), and Wuyur (Chinese: 乌雨尔; pinyin: Wūyǔ'ěr).

== History ==
The area of present-day Fuyu County was once inhabited by the Sushen.

The area also once belonged to the kingdom of Buyeo, and later Dumakru.

The area would later be inhabited by the Heishui Mohe.

The Liao dynasty then conquered the area, and placed it under Dongjing Circuit, which was then administered by Changchun Prefecture.

Under the Jin dynasty, the area was administered as Puyu Road.

Following the Jin dynasty, the area was ruled by the Yuan dynasty.

Under the Ming dynasty, which followed the Yuan, the area was administered as part of the Nurgan Regional Military Commission.

During the Qing dynasty, the area was administered as part of Qiqihar. In 1685, Qing settlers established a settlement in contemporary Fuyu, known as Dalaiketun (Chinese: 大来克屯; pinyin: Dàláikètún). Towards the end of the Qing dynasty, the region was put under the administration of Longjiang Fu and Yikeming'an Banner.

On March 19, 1929, the Republic of China reorganized the area as Fuyu Administrative Bureau, an Administrative Bureau.

On October 1, 1933, the puppet state of Manchukuo established Fuyu County. Since then, the county has changed provinces numerous times, and has changed prefecture a number of times, until December 15, 1984, when it was placed under Qiqihar, which has remained since.

== Administrative divisions ==
Fuyu County is divided into six towns, three townships, and one ethnic township.

The county's six towns are Fuyu, Fulu, Fuhai, Erdaowan, Long'anqiao, and Taha.

The county's three townships are Fanrong Township, Shaowen Township, and Zhonghou Township.

The county's sole ethnic township is Youyi Daur, Manchu, and Kirghiz Ethnic Township.

== Geography ==
Fuyu County is located on the left bank of the middle reaches of the Nen River, to the north of Qiqihar's urban core, and the adjacent prefecture-level city of Daqing. Qiqihar's downtown is located 65 kilometres (40 mi) to the southwest. Fuyu County is bordered by Yi'an County to the east, Gannan County to the west across Nen River, and the county-level city of Nehe to the north.

=== Topography ===
Fuyu County's elevation is higher in the northeast, and lower in the southwest, and the county has an average elevation of 185 metres (607 ft) above sea level.

=== Fauna ===
Wild animals common in Fuyu County include wolves, foxes, rabbits, red-crowned cranes, storks, and the scaly-sided merganser. Common sea creatures in Fuyu County include Asian carp, goldfish, and catfish.

=== Climate ===
Fuyu has a cold, monsoon-influenced, humid continental climate (Köppen Dwa), with four distinct seasons. It has long, bitterly cold, dry winters and very warm, rainy summers.

Climate data for Fuyu, elevation 163 m (535 ft), (1991–2020 normals, extremes 1971–2010)
Month	Jan	Feb	Mar	Apr	May	Jun	Jul	Aug	Sep	Oct	Nov	Dec	Year
Record high °C (°F)	0.5 (32.9)	9.7 (49.5)	20.7 (69.3)	28.8 (83.8)	35.8 (96.4)	40.7 (105.3)	38.1 (100.6)	35.5 (95.9)	33.3 (91.9)	26.8 (80.2)	14.5 (58.1)	5.3 (41.5)	40.7 (105.3)
Mean daily maximum °C (°F)	−13.5 (7.7)	−7.5 (18.5)	1.9 (35.4)	12.9 (55.2)	21.1 (70.0)	26.3 (79.3)	28.0 (82.4)	25.9 (78.6)	20.4 (68.7)	11.0 (51.8)	−2.0 (28.4)	−12.0 (10.4)	9.4 (48.9)
Daily mean °C (°F)	−19.3 (−2.7)	−14.1 (6.6)	−4.3 (24.3)	6.6 (43.9)	14.8 (58.6)	20.7 (69.3)	23.1 (73.6)	20.9 (69.6)	14.3 (57.7)	5.0 (41.0)	−7.3 (18.9)	−17.1 (1.2)	3.6 (38.5)
Mean daily minimum °C (°F)	−23.9 (−11.0)	−19.8 (−3.6)	−10.2 (13.6)	0.3 (32.5)	8.2 (46.8)	15.0 (59.0)	18.3 (64.9)	16.2 (61.2)	8.9 (48.0)	−0.1 (31.8)	−11.7 (10.9)	−21.4 (−6.5)	−1.7 (29.0)
Record low °C (°F)	−38.5 (−37.3)	−36.4 (−33.5)	−27.7 (−17.9)	−12.8 (9.0)	−3.9 (25.0)	2.7 (36.9)	9.2 (48.6)	7.4 (45.3)	−2.7 (27.1)	−16.4 (2.5)	−27.9 (−18.2)	−35.1 (−31.2)	−38.5 (−37.3)
Average precipitation mm (inches)	2.6 (0.10)	3.1 (0.12)	6.0 (0.24)	17.3 (0.68)	35.7 (1.41)	80.1 (3.15)	136.0 (5.35)	102.6 (4.04)	50.9 (2.00)	18.3 (0.72)	6.2 (0.24)	5.5 (0.22)	464.3 (18.27)
Average precipitation days (≥ 0.1 mm)	4.1	3.1	3.8	5.7	8.8	11.4	13.7	11.6	8.9	5.2	4.6	6.2	87.1
Average snowy days	6.8	5.0	5.4	2.7	0.2	0	0	0	0	2.1	6.2	8.5	36.9
Average relative humidity (%)	69	64	53	47	49	63	75	77	68	59	63	69	63
Mean monthly sunshine hours	176.8	206.8	251.6	235.7	246.9	234.1	226.1	224.8	226.8	209.4	170.9	153.4	2,563.3
Percentage possible sunshine	64	71	68	57	52	49	47	52	61	63	62	59	59
Source 1: China Meteorological Administration
Source 2: Weather China

== Demographics ==
=== Ethnic groups ===
The county is home to 17 different ethnic groups: Han Chinese, Manchu, Daur, Fuyu Kyrgyz, Mongolian, Hui, Tibetan, Miao, Yi, Zhuang, Buyi, Korean, Xibe, Yao, Ewenki, Oroqen, and Uygur. The Han Chinese comprise 95.5% of the county's population. Much of the county's ethnic minorities live in villages clustered together, such as Manchus living in the village of Sanjiazi (Chinese: 三家子; Romanized Manchu: Ilan Boo), Kyrgyz living in Wujiazi (Chinese: 五家子), Daurs living in Dengke (Chinese: 登科) and other villages, and Mongols living in Daxiaoquanzi (Chinese: 大小泉子).

==== Manchu ====
Fuyu County is home to approximately 7,000 Manchu people, most of whom live in the villages of Damagang (Chinese: 大马岗), Xiaomagang (Chinese: 小马岗), and Dagaoliang (Chinese: 大高粱). The town of Taha hosts an annual Manchu sports festival, which includes horse racing, wrestling, archery, a competition in the traditional Manchu sport of pearl ball (Chinese: 珍珠球), and other events.

==== Daur ====
Fuyu County's government estimates that there are approximately 6,000 Daur people living in the county, and that the county's Daur population migrated to the area during the 1750s.

Villages in Fuyu County with large amounts of Daur people include Dengke (Chinese: 登科) Dongji (Chinese: 东极), Dahazhou (Chinese: 大哈洲), Liangchufang (Chinese: 两出房), Shiwuli (Chinese: 十五里), Dongtaha (Chinese: 东塔哈), Xiaogaoliang (Chinese: 小高粱), Xitaha (Chinese: 西塔哈), Kumu (Chinese: 库木), Jiqibao (Chinese: 吉期堡) and Fufeng (Chinese: 富丰).

==== Mongol ====
Fuyu County is home to over 2,000 Mongols, who are predominantly Oirats. The county's Mongol population is largely concentrated in the villages of Daquanzi (Chinese: 大泉子), Xiaoquanzi (Chinese: 小泉子), Chenjiazi (Chinese: 陈家子), Bajiazi (Chinese: 八家子), and Sanjianfang (Chinese: 三间房).

==== Fuyu Kyrgyz ====
The largely Fuyu Kyrgyz village of Wujiazi is the largest concentration of Kyrgyz people in China, outside of Xinjiang. Of the 653 people who live in the village, 219 (33.54%) are Kyrgyz. Fuyu County as a whole has 1,400 Kyrgyz people. The Fuyu Kyrgyz are separate from the other Kyrgyz ethnic group (see the Fuyu Kyrgyz language classification), but they are usually listed as Kyrgyz by the authorities.

=== Languages ===
Sanjiazi (三家子; Romanized Manchu: Ilan Boo) in Fuyu County is one of the few villages whose elderly inhabitants are considered to being the last native speakers of Manchu. The village's school offers courses in Manchu.

The Fuyu Kyrgyz language is spoken in Fuyu County. It is not a variety of Kyrgyz, but is closer to the Siberian modern Khakas and the ancient language of the Yenisei Kyrgyz.

== Economy ==
Agriculture in Fuyu County is significant. Major crops grown within Fuyu County include soybeans, maize, wheat, rice, sorghum, millet, sugar beets, potatoes, sunflowers, and various vegetables. Common livestock in Fuyu County include dairy cows, beef cattle, pigs, sheep, and poultry.

Mineral resources in Fuyu County include sand, gravel, clay, peat, mineral water, quartz, chalk, and agate.

== Transportation ==
The Qiqihar–Bei'an railway and the Qiqihar–Jiagedaqi railway (Chinese: 齐加铁路; pinyin: Qí–Jiā tiělù) both run through Fuyu County. Major roads servicing Fuyu County include the G11 Hegang–Dalian Expressway and Heilongjiang Provincial Road S302.

== See also ==
- Aihui District, home to the village of Dawujia, which also boasts native Manchu speakers
- Daur people
- Fuyu Kyrgyz people
- Manchu people
- Sanjiazi
