= Klavdiya Plotnikova =

Last speaker of the Kamassian language

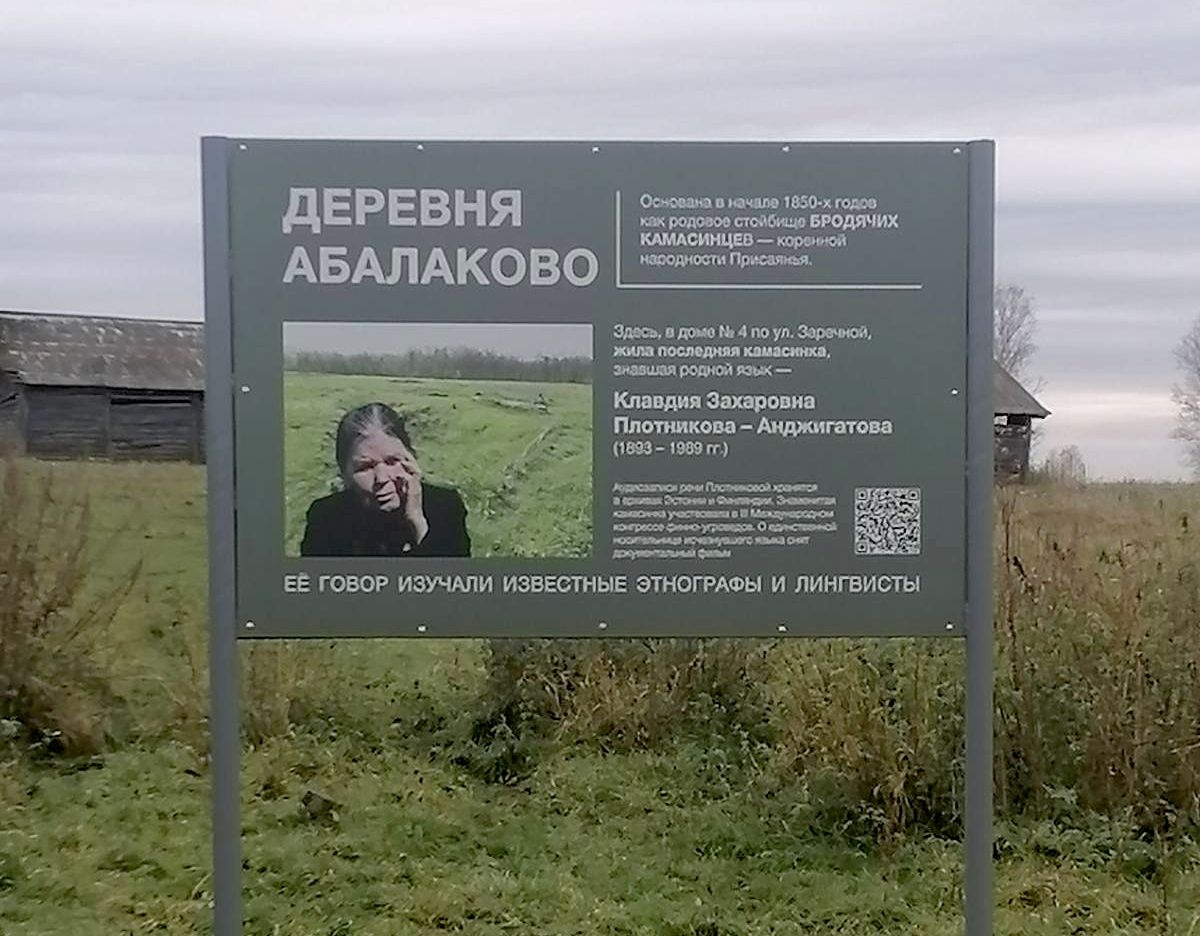
- An information stand in memory of Plotnikova in the village of Abalakovo, Sayansky District.
- Born: c. 1893; Russian Empire
- Died: September 20, 1989 (aged 95–96); Soviet Union
- Citizenship: Soviet Union
- Known for: Last speaker of Kamassian language

Signature
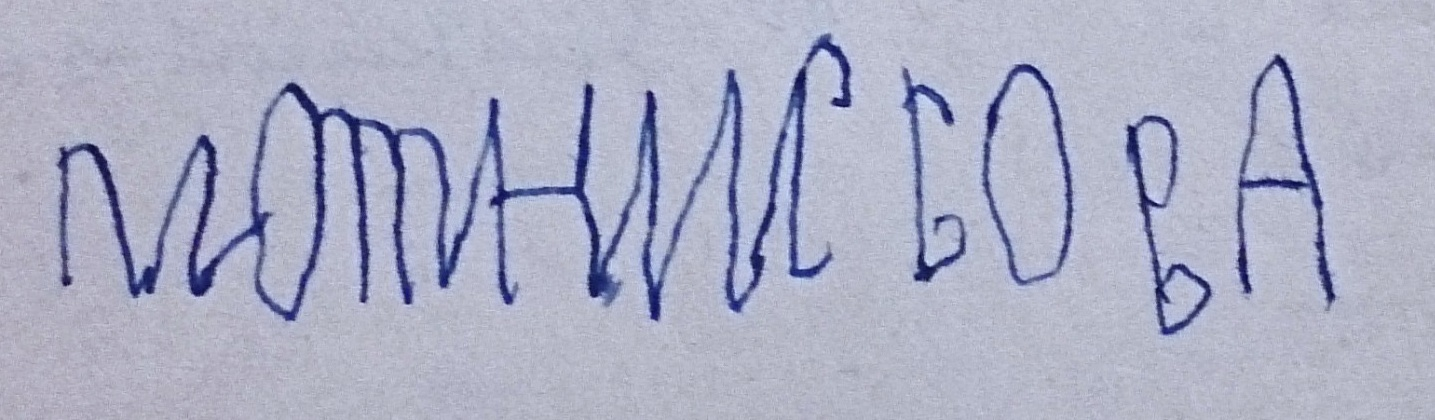

Klavdiya Zakharovna Plotnikova-Andzhighatova (Russian: Кла́вдия Заха́ровна Пло́тникова-Анджига́това, Kamas: Klawd'a; c. 1893 – 20 September 1989) was the last living speaker of the Kamas language (and thus of any of the Sayan Samoyedic languages). Her father was a Russian named Zakhar Perov and her mother was a Kamassian named Afanasiya Andzhighatova. Plotnikova-Andzhighatova and her parents are in slot 14 on the chart the Finnish linguist Kai Donner made of the Abalakovo Kamassian families.

Plotnikova-Andzhighatova did not have the opportunity to speak Kamassian after 1950 because she did not know anyone else who could speak it. Despite that, her Kamassian skills were fairly good, and she was a great help to philologists for the rest of her life. Plotnikova-Andzhighatova spoke fluent Russian, which she had learned in early childhood. With the decline of her native language, Russian became her only language. This affected her Kamas skills, especially her pronunciation, vocabulary, and sentence structures. Russian influence especially showed in her sentence structures and use of vocabulary; many morphologic forms and syntactic structures fell into disuse.

== Legacy ==
In October 2023, an information stand was installed by a group of enthusiasts at the initiative of the chairman of the Malinovskoye Rural Settlement in memory of Plotnikova in the village of Abalakovo.
