= Fuyu Kyrgyz people =

Turkic ethnic group of Heilongjiang, China

Fuyu Kyrgyz
Gïrgïs, Kyrgysdar

Total population
- 1,400

Regions with significant populations
- China: Fuyu County, Heilongjiang: 1,400

Languages
- Fuyu Kyrgyz, Oirat, Mandarin Chinese

Religion
- Tibetan Buddhism (Gelug), Shamanism

Related ethnic groups
- Khakas, Shors, Chulyms, Kyrgyz, Manchurian Öelets

The Fuyu Kyrgyz are a Turkic ethnic group who reside in Heilongjiang, China. They primarily reside in the Fuyu County.

== Migration ==
The Fuyu Kyrgyz resided in the region of Xinjiang, until the Qing government forced them to move to Heilongjiang nearly 200 years ago. Some Fuyu Kyrgyz came from the Russian Empire to northeast China 200 years before that. Some Fuyu Kyrgyz from Dzungaria moved to Manchuria in 1761.

== Relations with the Khakas ==
The Khakas are one of the closest groups to the Fuyu Kyrgyz. The Fuyu Kyrgyz went by the name Khonkoro during their exile.

== Language ==
Although the Fuyu Kyrgyz number more than 1,400, only 10 people speak the language and most people have shifted to the Mongolic language Oirat or Mandarin. It is closely related to Khakas.

== Culture ==
Many of the Fuyu Kyrgyz are cattle breeders and are also involved in hunting. The Fuyu Kyrgyz used to live in Mongolic-Turkic yurts, and the people wear loose clothing and belts. The Fuyu Kyrgyz instruments include the Khakas Khakashomysu. The Fuyu Kyrgyz and Tuva are one of the only Turkic groups in China which have not been recognised by the government as well as the Äynu people.
