= Sanjiazi =

Sanjiazi 三家子村 ᡳᠯᠠᠨᠪᠣᠣ Ilan boo
- Village
- Location in Heilongjiang
- Coordinates: 47°40′55″N 124°17′21″E
- Country: People's Republic of China
- Province: Heilongjiang
- Prefecture-level city: Qiqihar
- County: Fuyu
- Township: Youyi

Sanjiazi (Chinese: 三家子; pinyin: Sānjiāzi; Manchu: ᡳᠯᠠᠨᠪᠣᠣ, romanized: Ilan boo) is a village or Ilanbotokso in Youyi Daur, Manchu, and Kirghiz Ethnic Township (Chinese: 友谊达斡尔族满族柯尔克孜族乡; pinyin: Yǒuyì Dáwò'ěrzú Mǎnzú Kē'ěrkèzīzú Xiāng), Fuyu County, Qiqihar, Heilongjiang, China. The village is about 22 kilometres (14 mi) southwest of the administrative center of Fuyu, and about 6 kilometres (3.7 mi) west of the main road from Qiqihar.

== Overview ==
Approximately 80 elderly residents of the village are considered to be among the last people who have a good grasp of the historic pronunciation of Manchu. A local elementary school employs Manchu language teachers who learned the language from some of the older residents.

Over 70% of the residents are ethnic Manchu. Dong Xuefeng, an official with Youyi Township, said that Sanjiazi is the only village in China in which the Manchu language is spoken and the Manchu customs are observed because of its relative isolation.

== Manchu language spoken elsewhere ==
In 2019, Colin Thubron found one man alone in Dawujia(zi) in Aihui District of Heihe Prefecture who said he could still speak the language.

== Education ==
Sanjiazi Manchu Elementary School is located in the community. It includes Manchu classes and has tapes of Manchu speakers.
