= Mana (Russia) =

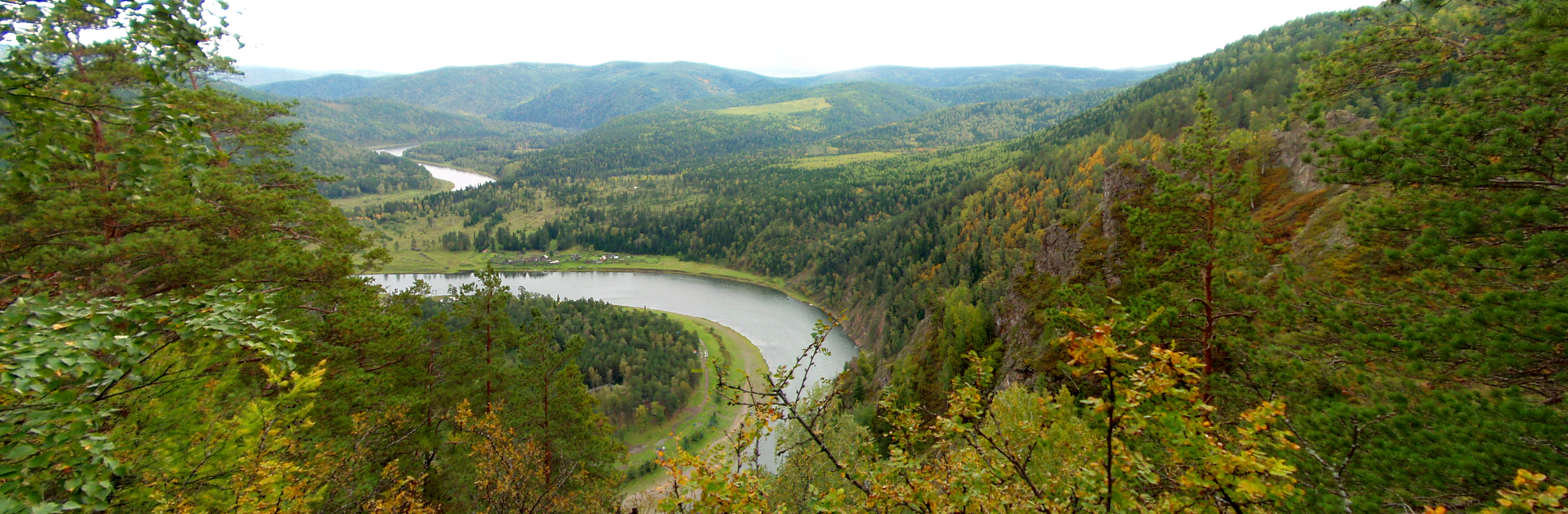
- The Mana near the village Ust-Mana. Manskiy Plyos can be seen near the bottom center.

Location
- Country: Russia

Physical characteristics
- Mouth: Yenisey
  - coordinates: 55.9417°N 92.475°E
- Length: 475 km (295 mi)
- Basin size: 9,320 km^{2} (3,600 sq mi)

Basin features
- Progression: Yenisey→ Kara Sea

The Mana (Russian: Ма́на) is a river in Krasnoyarsk Krai, Russia, a right tributary of the Yenisey. The Mana has a length of 475 kilometres (295 mi) and a basin area of 9,320 square kilometres (3,600 mi^{2}).

The Mana is a popular place of rafting tourism, mostly on the calm, easily passable part of the river beginning from the Beret village or more difficult, from the village of Bolshoy Ungut. The place called Manskiy Plyos near Ust-Mana is very popular for holding various festivals, such as the traditional festival of bard songs.

== Course ==
It flows northwest from the Eastern Sayan Mountains. The upper river called Pravaya Mana is a typical mountain river having many rapids, the lower part is calm, winding among the high hills. It joins the Yenisey some 16 kilometres (10 mi) from Krasnoyarsk city, where the Ust-Mana village is located.

The river freezes over in the first half of November, ice breaking usually begins in the second half of April.

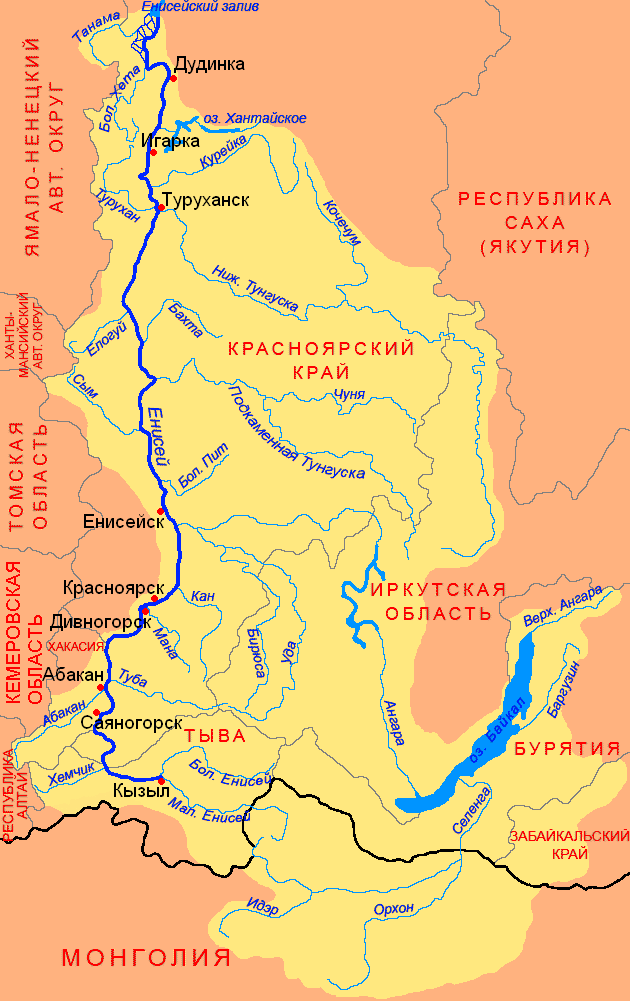
Basin of the Yenisey

== See also ==
- List of rivers of Russia
- Bazaikha
- Kacha (river)
- Krasnoyarsk
