= Khakas =

Ethnic group indigenous to Siberia

Хакас
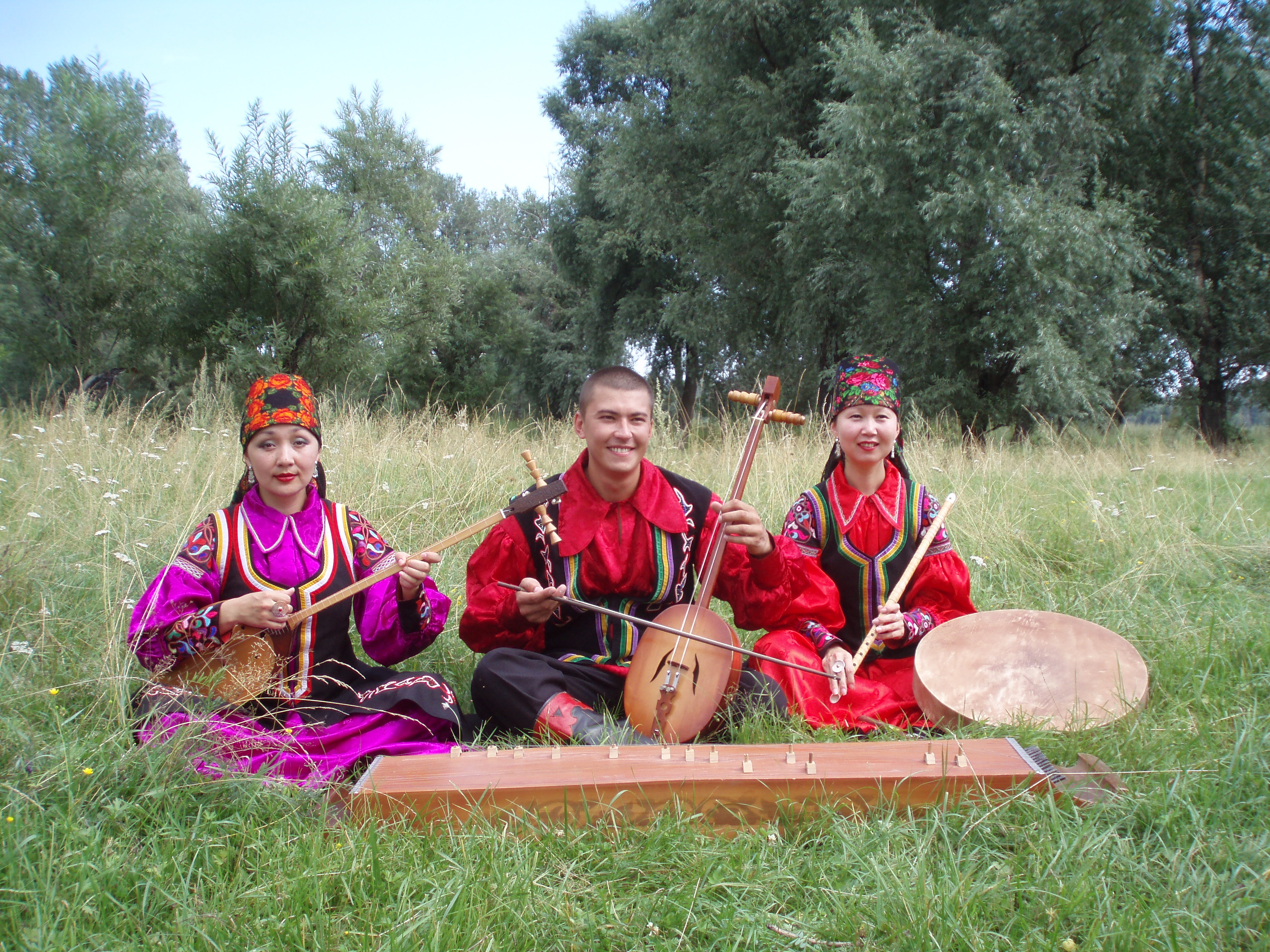
- Top: Khakas ethnic flag Bottom: Khakas with traditional instruments.

Total population
- 80,000 (est.)

Regions with significant populations
- Russia (primarily Khakassia)
- Russia: Khakassia: 63,643; Krasnoyarsk Krai: 4,102; Tuva: 877; Tomsk Oblast: 664; Kemerovo Oblast: 451; Novosibirsk Oblast: 401; Irkutsk Oblast: 298: 72,959
- Ukraine: 162
- China (Heilongjiang): About 1,500

Languages
- Khakas, Russian

Religion
- Predominantly Orthodox Christianity (Russian Orthodoxy); Also shamanism (Tengrism)

Related ethnic groups
- Chulyms, Kumandins, Siberian Tatars, Shors, Teleuts, Tofalar, Tuvans, Dukha, Soyot, Fuyu Kyrgyz, Kyrgyz, Kamasins

The Khakas or Khakass (Note: Khakas: sg. хакас/тадар, romanized: hakas/tadar, pl. хакастар/тадарлар, hakastar/tadarlar. Obsolete names: Minusinsk Tatars,Abakan Tatars, Achinsk Tatars, after the corresponding locations.) are a Turkic indigenous people of Siberia, who live in the republic of Khakassia, Russia. They speak the Khakas language.

The Khakhassian people are direct descendants of various ancient cultures that have inhabited southern Siberia, including the Andronovo culture, Samoyedic peoples, the Tagar culture, and the Yenisei Kyrgyz culture, although some populations traditionally called Khakhassian are not related to Khakhassians or any other ethnic group present in the area.

== Etymology ==
The Khakas people were historically known as Kyrgyz. Their endonym is the word Tadar. Following the Russian Revolution, the Soviet authorities changed the name of the group to Khakas, a newly-formed name based on the Chinese name for the Kyrgyz people, Xiaqiasi.

== History ==
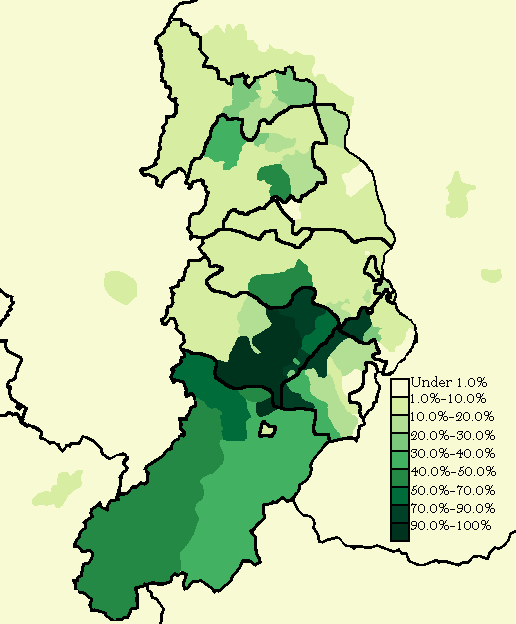
Khakas in Khakassia and neighboring areas

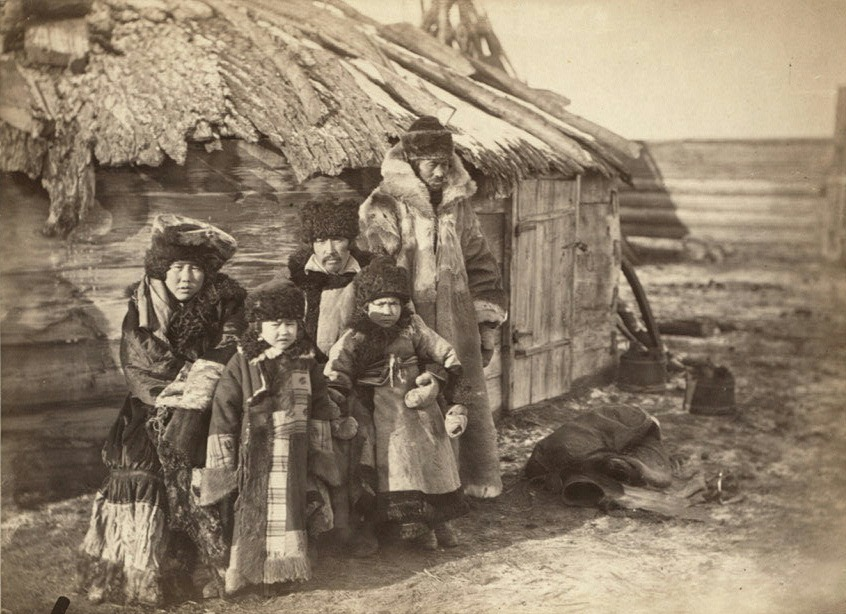
A group of Minusinsk Tatars and Khakass people. Early 20th century.

The Yenisei Kyrgyz were made to pay tribute in a treaty concluded between the Dzungars and Russians in 1635. The Dzungar Oirat Kalmyks coerced the Yenisei Kyrgyz into submission.

Some of the Yenisei Kyrgyz were relocated into the Dzungar Khanate by the Dzungars, and then the Qing moved them from Dzungaria to northeastern China in 1761, where they became known as the Fuyu Kyrgyz. Sibe Bannermen were stationed in Dzungaria while Northeastern China (Manchuria) was where some of the remaining Öelet Oirats were deported to. The Nonni basin was where Oirat Öelet deportees were settled. The Yenisei Kyrgyz were deported along with the Öelet. Chinese and Oirat replaced Oirat and Kyrgyz during Manchukuo as the dual languages of the Nonni-based Yenisei Kyrgyz.

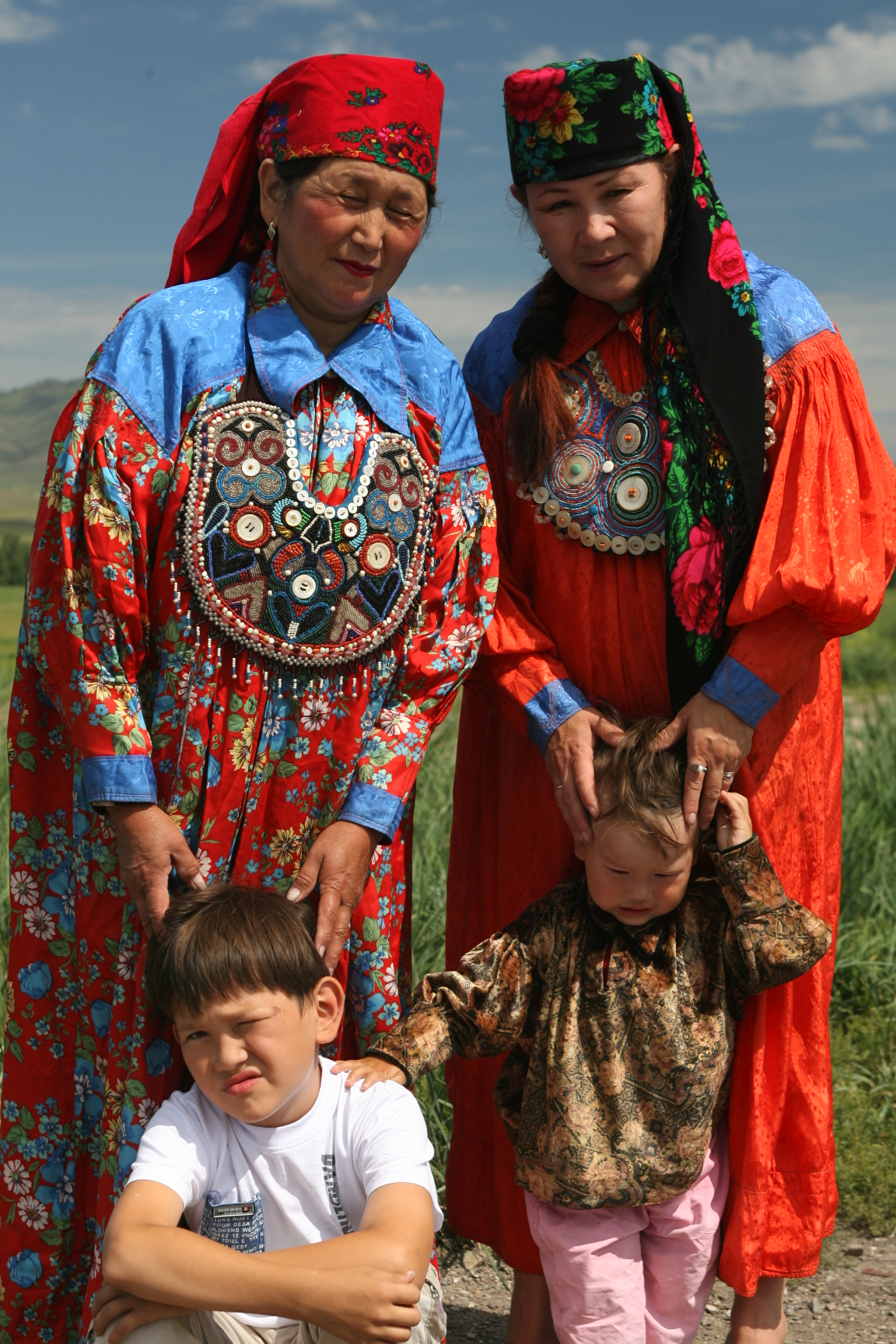
Khakas women with children at the beginning of the 21st century.

In the 17th century, the Khakas formed Khakassia in the middle of the lands of Yenisei Kyrgyz, who at the time were vassals of a Mongolian ruler. The Russians arrived shortly after the Kyrgyz left, and an inflow of Russian agragian settlers began. In the 1820s, gold mines started to be developed around Minusinsk, which became a regional industrial center.

The names Khongorai and Khoorai were applied to the Khakas before they became known as the Khakas. Khakas refer to themselves as Tadar. Khoorai (Khorray) has also been in use to refer to them. Now the Khakas call themselves Tadar and do not use Khakas to describe themselves in their own language. They are also called Abaka Tatars.

During the 19th century, many Khakas accepted the Russian ways of life, and most were converted en masse to Russian Orthodox Christianity. Shamanism, however, is still common;. Many Christians practice shamanism with Christianity. In Imperial Russia, the Khakas used to be known under other names, used mostly in historic contexts: Minusinsk Tatars (Russian: минуси́нские тата́ры), Abakan Tatars (абака́нские тата́ры), and Yenisei Turks.

During the Revolution of 1905, a movement towards autonomy developed. When Soviets came to power in 1923, the Khakas National District was established, and various ethnic groups (Beltir, Sagai, Kachin, Koibal, and Kyzyl) were artificially "combined" into one—the Khakas. The National District was reorganized into Khakas Autonomous Oblast, a part of Krasnoyarsk Krai, in 1930. The Republic of Khakassia in its present form was established in 1992.

Khakas account for only about 12% of the total population of the republic (78,500 as of 1989 Census). Khakas traditionally practiced nomadic herding, agriculture, hunting, and fishing. The Beltir people specialized in handicraft as well. Herding sheep and cattle is still common, although the republic became more industrialized over time.

== Genetics ==
=== Paternal lineages ===
Genetic research has identified 4 primary paternal lineages in the Khakhas population.

- Haplogroup N is the predominant paternal haplogroup in the Khakhas population. It represents roughly 64% of Khakas male lineages, mainly N1b (N1b-P43, subclade N-VL67) (around 44%) and N1c (M178) (around 20%). It has been proposed that haplogroup N1b (specifically N2a1-B478) in the Khakassians may represent descent from Samoyedic speakers who were assimilated by Turkic speakers.
- Haplogroup R1a is the second most common haplogroup in Khakhas populations; representing 27.9-33% of the total. Haplogroup R1a has the predominant paternal haplogroup in the Altai region since the appearance of the Andronovo culture. It represents a migration of Indo-European speakers who migrated east and settled in central Siberia in the Bronze and Iron Age periods, such as the Indo-Iranian Andronovo culture and the Tagar culture.

=== Maternal lineages ===
Over 80% of Khakassian mtDNA lineages belong to East Eurasian lineages, although a significant percentage (18.9%) belong to various West Eurasian mtDNA lineages.

== Religion ==
At present, the Khakas predominantly are Orthodox Christians (Russian Orthodox Church).

Also there is traditional shamanism (Tengrism), including following movements:

- Khakas Heritage Center—the Society of Traditional Religion of Khakas Shamanism "Ah-Chayan" (Russian: Центр хакасского наследия — общество традиционной религии хакасского шаманизма "Ах-Чаян");
- Traditional religion of the Khakas society "Izykh" (Russian: Общество традиционной религии хакасского народа "Изых");
- Traditional religion society "Khan Tigir" (Russian: Общество традиционной религии "Хан Тигир").

== See also ==
- Turkic Christians
- Music of Khakassia
