= Khakas language =

Northeastern Turkic language

Khakas
- Хакас тілі Xakas tĕlĕ тадар тілі Tadar tĕlĕ
- Native to: Russia
- Region: Khakassia
- Ethnicity: Khakas
- Native speakers: 29,000 (2021)
- Language family: Turkic: Common Turkic; Siberian Turkic; South Siberian; Yenisei Turkic; Khakas
- Dialects: Fuyu Kyrgyz; Kamas Turk †; Sagay; Kachin; Kyzyl
- Writing system: Cyrillic

Official status
- Official language in: Russia: Khakassia

Language codes
- ISO 639-3: kjh
- Glottolog: khak1248
- ELP: Khakas
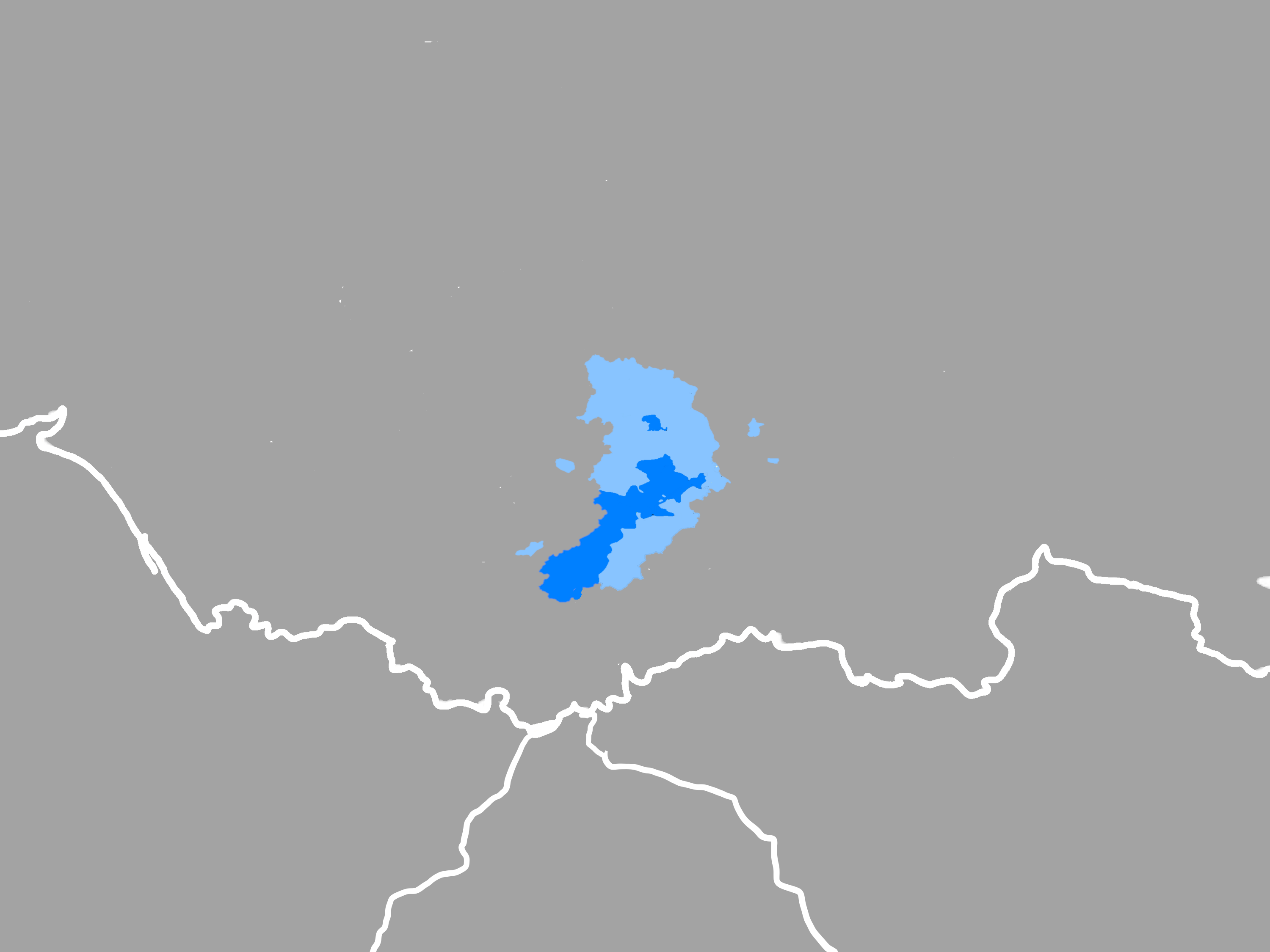
- Areas where Khakas is spoken as a Majority language Areas where Khakas is spoken as a Minority language

- Khakas is classified as Definitively Endangered by the UNESCO Atlas of the World's Languages in Danger.

Khakas, also known as Xakas (Khakas: Хакас тілі, romanized: Xakas tĕlĕ or тадар тілі, Tadar tĕlĕ), is a Turkic language spoken by the Khakas, who mainly live in the southwestern Siberian Republic of Khakassia, in Russia. The Khakas number 61,000, of whom 29,000 speak the Khakas language. Most Khakas speakers are bilingual in Russian.

== Dialects ==
Traditionally, the Khakas language is divided into several closely related dialects, which take their names from the different tribes: Sagay, Kacha, Koybal, Beltir, and Kyzyl. In fact, these names represent former administrative units rather than tribal or linguistic groups. The people speaking all these dialects simply referred to themselves as Тадар (Tadar, i.e. Tatar). The Khakas language also has a dialect named Kamas Turk, which according to the UNESCO Atlas of the World's Languages in Danger has been extinct since the 1950s.

== History and documentation ==
The people who speak the Fuyu Kyrgyz language originated in the Yenisei region of Siberia but were relocated into the Dzungar Khanate by the Dzungars, and then the Qing moved them from Dzungaria to northeastern China in 1761, and the name may be due to the survival of a common tribal name. The Yenisei Kirghiz were made to pay tribute in a treaty concluded between the Dzungars and Russians in 1635. Sibe Bannermen were stationed in Dzungaria while it was Northeastern China (Manchuria) where some of the remaining Öelet Oirats were deported to. The Nonni basin was where Oirat Öelet deportees were settled. The Yenisei Kirghiz were deported along with the Öelet. Chinese and Oirat replaced Oirat and Kirghiz during Manchukuo as the dual languages of the Nonni-based Yenisei Kirghiz. The present-day Kyrgyz people originally lived in the same area that the speakers of Fuyu Kyrgyz at first dwelled within modern-day Russia. These Kyrgyz were known as the Yenisei Kyrgyz. It is now spoken in northeastern China's Heilongjiang province, in and around Fuyu County, Qiqihar (300 km northwest of Harbin) by a small number of passive speakers who are classified as Kyrgyz nationality.

The first major recordings of the Khakas language originate from the middle of the 19th century. The Finnish linguist Matthias Castrén, who travelled through northern and Central Asia between 1845 and 1849, wrote a treatise on the Koybal dialect, and recorded an epic. Wilhelm Radloff traveled the southern Siberian region extensively between 1859 and 1870. The result of his research was, among others, published in his four-volume dictionary, and in his ten-volume series of Turkic texts. The second volume contains his Khakas materials, which were provided with a German translation. The ninth volume, provided with a Russian translation, was prepared by Radloff's student Katanov, who was a Sagay himself, and contains further Khakas materials.

The Khakas literary language, which was developed only after the Russian Revolution of 1917, is based on the central dialects Sagay and Kacha; the Beltir dialect has largely been assimilated by Sagay, and the Koybal dialect by Kacha.

In 1924, a Cyrillic alphabet was devised, which was replaced by a Latin alphabet in 1929, and by a new Cyrillic alphabet in 1939.

In 2012, an Enduring Voices expedition documented the Xyzyl language from the Republic of Khakassia. Officially considered a dialect of Khakas, its speakers regard Xyzyl as a separate language of its own.

== Classification ==
The Khakas language is part of the South Siberian subgroup of Turkic languages, along with Shor, Chulym, Tuvan, Tofa, and Northern Altai. The language of the Turkic-speaking Yugurs of Gansu and the Fuyu Kyrgyz language of a small group of people in Manchuria also share some similarities with languages of this subgroup. The Khakas language has also been part of a wider language area covering the Southern Samoyedic languages Kamassian and Mator. A distinctive feature that these languages share with Khakas and Shor is a process of nasal assimilation, whereby a word-initial palatal stop (in all of these languages from an earlier palatal approximant *j) develops into an alveolar nasal /n/ or a palatal nasal /ɲ/, when followed by another word-internal nasal consonant.

== Phonology ==
Khakas vowels
	Front		Back	
Close	i ⟨и⟩ iː ⟨ии⟩ ɘ ⟨і⟩	y ⟨ӱ⟩ yː ⟨ӱӱ⟩	ɯ ⟨ы⟩ ɯː ⟨ыы⟩	u ⟨у⟩ uː ⟨уу⟩
Mid	e ⟨е⟩ eː ⟨ее⟩	ø ⟨ӧ⟩ øː ⟨ӧӧ⟩		o ⟨о⟩ oː ⟨оо⟩
Open			a ⟨а⟩ aː ⟨аа⟩	

Khakas consonants
		Labial	Dental	Palatal	Velar
Nasal		m ⟨м⟩	n ⟨н⟩		ŋ ⟨ң⟩
Plosive/ Affricate	voiceless	p ⟨п⟩	t ⟨т⟩	t͡ʃ ⟨ч⟩	k ⟨к⟩
Plosive/ Affricate	voiced	b ⟨б⟩	d ⟨д⟩	d͡ʒ ⟨ӌ⟩	ɡ ⟨г⟩
Fricative	voiceless		s ⟨с⟩		x ⟨х⟩
Fricative	voiced		z ⟨з⟩		ɣ ⟨ғ⟩
Rhotic			r ⟨р⟩		
Approximant			l ⟨л⟩	j ⟨й⟩	

== Orthography ==
Latin alphabet (1929–1939):

A a	B в	C c	Ç ç	D d	E e	Ə ə	F f
G g	Ƣ ƣ	I i	Į į	J j	K k	L l	M m
N n	Ꞑ ꞑ	O o	Ɵ ɵ	P p	R r	S s	Ş ş
T t	U u	V v	X x	Y y	Z z	Ƶ ƶ	Ь ь

Cyrillic alphabet (1939–present):

А а	Б б	В в	Г г	Ғ ғ	Д д	Е е	Ё ё
Ж ж	З з	И и	Й й	І і	К к	Л л	М м
Н н	Ң ң	О о	Ӧ ӧ	П п	Р р	С с	Т т
У у	Ӱ ӱ	Ф ф	Х х	Ц ц	Ч ч	Ӌ ӌ	Ш ш
Щ щ	Ъ ъ	Ы ы	Ь ь	Э э	Ю ю	Я я

== Grammar ==
=== Grammatical cases ===
Standard Khakas has 10 grammatical cases.

Case	Suffix	Example
nominative	-∅	от grass
genitive	-тың, -тің, -ның, -нің	оттың grass-GEN of (the) grass
dative	-ха -ке, -ға, -ге, -а, -е;	отха grass-DAT to the grass
accusative	-ты -ті, -ны, -нi;	отты grass-ACC grass
locative	-та -те, -да, -де	отта grass-LOC on/in the grass
ablative	-таң, -тең, -даң, -дең, -наң, -нең	оттаң grass-ABL from the grass
directive/allative	-сар, -сер, -зар, -зер	отсар grass-DIR/ALL towards the grass
instrumental/comitative	-наң, -нең	отнаң grass-INS/COM with the grass
equative/prosecutive	-ча -че, -ҷа, -ҷе, -нҷа, -нҷе	отча grass-EQU/PROS through the grass
Circumstantial-Causalis	-даңар -деңер, -таңар, -теңер, -наңар, -неңер	оттаңар grass-CIR about grass, because of (the) grass

=== Auxiliary verb constructions ===
Xakas is rich in complex predicate formations in which many simple verbs are used to mark various types of aspects, modality, aktionsart, and directions to the main lexical head. A highly-detailed semantics verb like xon 'spend a night' can simply occur as the marker of an unexpected action:

ib-deŋ sɨɣara par-a xon-ɣa-m
house-ABL from go-CONV UNEXP-PST-1
'All of a sudden I left the house.'

The probabilitive, which was derived from the future form of pol ('to (be)come'), displays a split-inflected pattern, with tense encoded on the lexical head, and person/number on the auxiliary:

min nime=e tʃobal-tʃatxan-ɨm=ni sɪrer pil-tʃe polar-zar
I what=DAT be.sad-PRES.PTCPL-1=ACC you.PL know-PRES PROB-2
'You probably know what I am sad about.'

== Vocabulary ==
Khakas has a core Turkic vocabulary. Although there were no historic contacts with Arabic (or Islam), the vocabulary features few Arabic words, for example, хабар "news, tiding", халых "people, a mass (of people), society". Some communist-minded writers of the Soviet Union tended to view such words as emanating from the efforts of bourgeois-nationalists who, they argued, tried to rid the Khakas language from Russian loanwords by importing foreign words from Arabic and Mongolic origin.
