= Kamas language =

Extinct Samoyed language

Kamas
- "Kamass", "Kamassian"
- Kaŋmažən šəkət
- Native to: Russia
- Region: Sayan Mountains
- Ethnicity: 2-21 Kamasins (2021)
- Extinct: September 20, 1989, with the death of Klavdiya Plotnikova
- Language family: Uralic: Samoyedic; (core); Kamas–Selkup; Kamas
- Dialects: Koibal; Kamas: Eagle; Fat

Language codes
- ISO 639-3: xas
- Glottolog: kama1351 kama1378
- ELP: Kamas
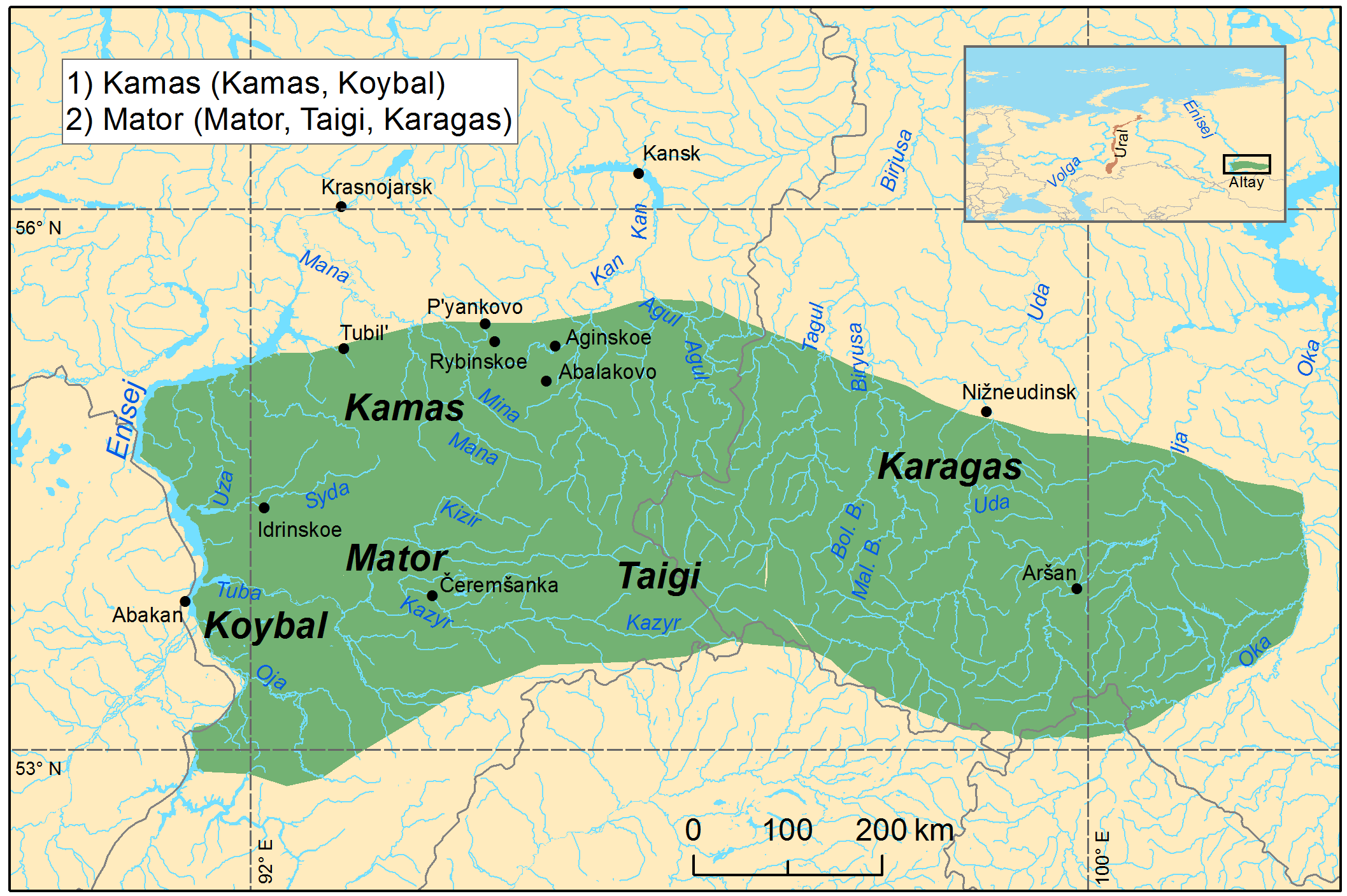
- Traditional distribution of the extinct Sayan Samoyedic languages including Kamas

Kamas (Kaŋmažən šəkət) is an extinct Samoyedic language formerly spoken by the Kamasins. It is included by convention in the Southern Samoyedic group together with Mator and Selkup (although this does not constitute a subfamily). The last native speaker of Kamas, Klavdiya Plotnikova, died in 1989. It has been noted that at present a few activists still have knowledge of the Kamasin language, however. Kamas was spoken in Russia, north of the Sayan Mountains, by Kamasins. The last speakers lived mainly in the village of Abalakovo, where they moved from the mountains in the 18th to 19th centuries. Prior to its extinction, the language had been strongly influenced by Turkic and Yeniseian languages.

The term Koibal is used as the ethnonym for the Kamas people who shifted to the Turkic Khakas language. The modern Koibal people are mixed Samoyed–Khakas–Yeniseian. The Kamas language was documented by Kai Donner in his trips to Siberia along with other Samoyedic languages, but the first documentation attempts started in the 1740s. In 2016 the university of Tartu published a Kamas e-learning book. Linguists managed to record about 1,550 words of the Kamasin language. The grammar and vocabulary of Kamas are well documented. In 2024, a Kamas learning book was made by the Russian Geographical Society for the purpose of reviving the Kamas language.

== History ==
The Kamasins had never been a large group, and they lived a nomadic life, living next to Turkic and Yeniseian tribes. In the middle of the 17th century, Sayan Samoyeds started to assimilate into Turkic peoples and Kamas was the only one to survive until investigators came, such as Castrén and Kai Donner. Due to many hardships in Russia, Kai Donner was virtually certain that he would be the last one to investigate the Kamas language before it went extinct. Already in the middle of the 20th century it was thought Kamas had died. However it was later found there was still one speaker of Kamas left: Klavdiya Plotnikova. The Kamas speakers also assimilated into the Russians, as well as being turkicized. In the 20th century half of the Kamas people were born to Russian mothers, due to a higher death-rate of girls, which caused much influence to come from the Russian language. After the Russian Civil War, usage of the Kamas language started to fall drastically.

== Dialects ==
Kamas had two dialects: Kamas (also known as Kamass) and Koibal. However, the Koibal dialect is not well documented and only about 600 words of it are known, without any text or grammar. The Kamass dialect also had two sub-dialects, "Fat" (sil-əj-zeŋ) and "Eagle" (nʲiɡ-əj-zeŋ), which mainly differed in phonology. The Eagle dialect was the most dominant Kamas dialect.

Example of the Eagle and Fat dialect.
Eagle	Fat	English
kaaʒuk	kaaʒok	ankle
ʒeedü	ćüüʔdü	Betula nana
bürüʔgə̑	bürüʔgo	half-dark
ʒ́aγa	ćaγa	river

== Phonology ==
The phonological account of Kamas is very basic, due to unclear data labeling by K. Donner and Castren. It is uncertain whether Kamas had primary vowel length, consonant gemination, and palatal stops or affricates as different phonemes. It varied widely between speakers. However, there are audio recordings of the last native speaker.

Kamas has both palatalized and palatal phonemes.

=== Consonants ===
Consonants according to Klumpp
		Bilabial		Dental		Postalveolar		Palatal	Velar		Glottal	
		plain	pal.	plain	pal.	plain	pal.	Palatal	plain	pal.	plain	pal.
Nasal		m	mʲ	n				ɲ	ŋ			
Plosive	voiceless	p	pʲ	t				c	k	kʲ	ʔ	
Plosive	voiced	b	bʲ	d					g			
Affricate						t͡ʃ^{1}						
Fricative				s	sʲ	ʃ	ʃʲ				h	hʲ
Trill				r								
Glide								j				
Lateral				l	lʲ							

1. The affricates may just be consonant clusters.

Consonants according to Künnap
		Bilabial		Coronal			Palatal	Velar	Laryngeal
		Bilabial		Dental		Post- alveolar	Palatal	Velar	Laryngeal
		plain	pal.	plain	pal.	Post- alveolar	Palatal	Velar	Laryngeal
Nasal		m		n	nʲ			ŋ	
Plosive/ Affricate^{1}	voiceless	p	pʲ	t		t͡ʃ		k	ʔ
Plosive/ Affricate^{1}	voiced	b	bʲ	d		d͡ʒ		g	
Fricative	voiceless			s	sʲ	ʃ		x	
Fricative	voiced			z	zʲ	ʒ		ɣ^{1}	
Trill				r					
Glide		w					j		
Lateral				l	lʲ				

K. Donner also mentioned a sound ϑ (θ) and a f sound that was used in loanwords. Kamas also had aspiration.

1. ɣ seems to have been an allophone of g for some speakers.

=== Vowels ===
Vowels
		Front		Back	
		unrounded	rounded	unrounded	rounded
full	Close	i	y	(ɯ)	u
full	Mid	e	ø		o
full	Open	(æ)		ɑ	(ɒ)
reduced	non-1st syll.	ə			
reduced	1st syll.	ĭ		ɑ̆	

=== Phonotactics ===
The maximal syllable structure is CVCC. The only type of cluster allowed in the coda is ʔC. An example of this would be naʔb (duck). Palatalization only occurs in front of vowels. Three consonants do not occur word initially: the trill r, the velar nasal, and the glottal stop.

=== Variations ===
The last Kamas speakers had some variations in their speech and a few vowels and consonants were slightly different depending on the speaker, for example:

oo ~ ee

ə ~ ɯ

x ~ k͔´

b ~ β (w)

== Grammar ==
Kamas is an agglutinative language and it has many flective markers.

Kamas has 7 cases:

Kamas cases
	Case
Basic	-∅
Accusative	-(ǝ)m
Genitive	-(ǝ)n
Dative/Lative	-n(ǝ) ~ -dǝ ~ -tǝ
Locative	-Kǝn ~ -gǝn
Ablative	-gǝʔ ~ -kǝʔ
Instrumental	źəʔ ~ -śəʔ

The plural ending is -zaŋ ~ -zeŋ ~ -saŋ ~ -seŋ. However, there are a few irregularities : ešši 'child', esseŋ 'children', bulan 'moose' and genitive bulaan.

The word koot 'rib' declined
Case	Singular
nominative	koot
genitive	koodǝn
accusative	koodǝm
lative	koottǝ
locative	kootkǝn
ablative	kootgǝʔ
instrumental	kootźǝʔ

=== Verbs ===
There are three tenses and moods in Kamas: conditional, imperative, future, present tense, past tense and optative.

The conditional is formed by -na ~ -ne after vowels and -ta ~ -te ~ -da ~ -de after consonants. The second component is -ze which comes after the personal ending.

kandamze 'I would go'.

- Imperative is done by adding -ʔ or -Kǝ.
- Optative ending is -š(ti) in the singular and -Šǝ in the plural and dual.
- The past tense is done by adding -BiA for the 1st and 2nd person singular or -Bi in others.
- The future tense is marked with -LA.

==== Negatives ====
In Kamas a verb is made negative by adding the word e ~ i with the main verb. Examples with the word šo- 'come':

- ej šoliam = I don't come
- ej šolial = you don't come
- ej šobiam = I did not come
- ej šobial = you did not come
- em šoʔ = I will not come
- ellǝ šoʔ = you will not come

Additionally, Kamas, like many typical Uralic languages, has (co-)double negative formation. The co-negative marker follows the lexical verb while TAM/person is encoded by the main negative marker.

e-m ʃo-ʔ
NEG-1 come-CONNEG
'I am not coming.'

tan e-l-lə ʃɯ-ʔ
you NEG-PRES-2 enter-CONNEG
'You don't enter.'

==== Word formation ====
Factitive verbs have the ending aa: ešši 'child': eššā = make children.

Deverbal nouns have the ending (ǝ)š: am- 'eat': amǝš 'food'.

Instrumental nouns have the ending (p)zan or (p)zǝn: kaj = close, kajzan = lid.

=== Syntax ===
Kamas is a nominative type language, and the common structure of a Kamas sentence includes the subject, the object, the adverbial modifier, and a predicate. The subject is in the nominative case. The indefinite object is often expressed by using the nominative but the definite object with the accusative case. The adverbial modifier can also be expressed with adverbs or nouns in the form of local or instrumental cases. The predicate in Kamas can be preceded by gerundial verb forms, which indicates the manner or tense of an action that is expressed by the predicate. Composite sentences are not used in the Kamas language. Instead of sentences which are complex Kamas uses simple sentences with gerundial verbal constructions in which case it has no need to use conjunctions or a sequence of several simple sentences. In Kamas the subject and predicate must both agree in the person and in number.

Words which typically are used in attributive positions: (demonstrative pronouns, pronominal adjectives, and numerals) can also function as argument expressions. There are also no prepositions in Kamas, instead postpositions are used and the head of a postposition, usually is marked with a genitive (-ǝn/-n). However, there are also primary postpositions which can govern the lative case. The word order in Kamas is SOV (subject-object-verb), but the word order VO occurs when using an imperative. Clauses which introduce a situation, the locative adverbial often precedes the subject. In clauses which a new subject appears in a place which is given there is a reverse order. In Kamas the third person, zero copula predication varies with the usage of the verb i- 'be'. Kamas direct objects are subject to differential object agreement and to differential object marking. Subordinating conjunctions in Kamas are kamǝn 'when' and paka 'while', which is a borrowing from Russian пока.

== Examples of Kamas ==
(examples in the UPA script)

d͔aγaibᵊ sēləbiə̑m, sēlᵊnnᵊ p͑im bɯn ɯštᵊbiəm. ťš́a˱'
knife-1SG grind-PST-1SG grind-PTC stone-ACC water-LAT drop-PST-1SG otter
I sharpened my knife, I dropped the sharpening stone into the water.—Fishotter

ťăbaktǝrla'bǝm ĭmbi popalo
speak-DUR.PRES-1SG what {happened (Russian)}
I tell what has happened

dĭgǝttǝ măna kumbii' kazān turānǝ
then me-OBL bring-PST-3PL Russian.GEN house-LAT
Then they took me to Aginskoe

dĭn măna kros embii'
there me-OBL cross put-PST-3PL
there they put a cross to me (probably 'baptized me')

=== Examples of the Koibal dialect ===
Russian gloss	Original transcription	Retranscription	English gloss
беззубый	тимазетъ	timɛ=zǝt	toothless
безпамятный	сагассэтъ	sagǝs=sǝt	mindless
безрогiй	амнызетъ	amnu=zǝt	hornless

=== Basic phrases ===
Basic phrases in Kamas:

- Kăde tănan kăštəliaʔi? = What is your name?
- măna kăštəbiʔi = My name is
- naga = isn't
- jakšə = good
- ej = no
