= Koibal people =

Subdivision of the Khakass people of Siberia

Koibals
Khakas: хойбал

Total population
- 2400

Languages
- Khakas (Kamas Turk), Russian, formerly Kamas (Koibal)

Religion
- Orthodox Christianity with elements of shamanism and animism (before communism)

Related ethnic groups
- Other Samoyedic peoples and Yeniseian people

The Koibal (Khakas: хойбал, romanized: xoybal) are one of the subdivisions of the Khakass people of southern Siberia. Although they speak the Turkic Khakas language, the Koibal have mixed ancestry and used to speak a Yeniseian language and the Koibal dialect of the Kamas language, both of which are now extinct. They formed in the late 19th century from the merger of the Abugach, Baikot, Kandyk, Tarazhak, Kol and Arsh peoples. Most of these people are believed to have been of ancestry more closely related to Samoyedic peoples than to Turks. Koibals live in the Beysky District of Khakassia.

Prior to the rise of Communism the Koibal were officially Russian Orthodox. However they had retained many Shamanist and Animist customs.

== Sources ==
- Wixman, Ronald. The Peoples of the USSR: An Ethnographic Handbook. (Armonk, New York: M. E. Sharpe, Inc., 1984) p. 109.
