= Fuyu Kyrgyz language =

Siberian Turkic language spoken in China

Fuyu Kyrgyz
- Fuyü Gïrgïs
- Gĭrgĭs
- Pronunciation: [qərʁəs]
- Native to: China
- Region: Heilongjiang
- Ethnicity: 880 Fuyu Kyrgyz
- Native speakers: 10 (2007)
- Language family: Turkic: Common Turkic; Siberian Turkic; South Siberian; Yenisei Turkic; Fuyu Kyrgyz
- Writing system: Mongolian script

Language codes
- ISO 639-3: None (mis)
- Glottolog: fuyu1243
- ELP: Manchurian Kirghiz
- Manchurian Kirghiz is classified as Critically Endangered by the UNESCO Atlas of the World's Languages in Danger.

Fuyu Kyrgyz (Fuyü Gïrgïs, Fu-Yu Kirgiz), also known as Manchurian Kirghiz, is a critically endangered Turkic language, and as gɨr.gɨs, Gïrgïs, Kyrgysdar is an ethnonym of the Turkic unrecognized ethnic group in China. Despite the name, the Fuyu Kyrgyz language is not closely related to the Kyrgyz language, which is of Kipchak origin. The Fuyu Kyrgyz language is more similar to the Western Yugur language and the Abakan Turkic languages. The Fuyu Kyrgyz were relocated from the present day Kizilsu Kyrgyz Autonomous Prefecture by the Qing government nearly 200 years ago.

In 1761, after the Dzungars were defeated by the Qing, a group of Yenisei Kirghiz were deported (along with some Öelet or Oirat-speaking Dzungars) to the Nonni (Nen) river basin in Manchuria/Northeast China. The Kyrgyz in Manchuria became known as the Fuyu Kyrgyz, but many have become merged into the Mongol and Chinese population. Chinese and Oirat replaced Oirat and Kirghiz during the period of Manchukuo as the dual languages of the Nonni-based Kyrgyz.

The Fuyu Kyrgyz language is now spoken in northeastern China's Heilongjiang province, in and around Fuyu County, Qiqihar (300 km northwest of Harbin) by a small number of passive speakers who are classified as Kyrgyz nationality. Fuyu County as a whole has 1,400 Fuyu Kyrgyz people.

== Speakers ==
In 1980, Fuyu Girgis was spoken by a majority of adults in a community of around a hundred homes. However, many adults in the area have switched to speaking a local variety of Mongolian, and children have switched to Chinese as taught in the education system.

== Phonology ==
Although a complete phonemic analysis of Girgis has not been done, Hu and Imart have made numerous observations about the sound system in their tentative description of the language. They describe Girgis as having the short vowels noted as "a, ï, i, o, ö, u, ü" which correspond roughly to IPA [a, ə, ɪ, ɔ, œ, ʊ, ʉ], with minimal rounding and tendency towards centralization. Vowel length is phonemic and occurs as a result of consonant-deletion (Girgis /pʉːn/ vs. Kyrgyz /byɡyn/ 'today'). Each short vowel has an equivalent long vowel, with the addition of /e/. Girgis displays vowel harmony as well as consonant harmony. The consonant sounds in Girgis, including allophone variants, are [p, b, ɸ, β, t, d, ð, k, q, ɡ, h, ʁ, ɣ, s, ʃ, z, ʒ, dʒ, tʃ, m, n, ŋ, l, r, j]. Girgis does not display a phonemic difference between the stop set /p, t, k/ and /b, d, ɡ/; these stops can also be aspirated to [pʰ, tʰ, kʰ] in Chinese loanwords.

== Sample text ==
A song in the Fuyu Kyrgyz language:

dax diben šabim am,
dabendar baarsen γaxen jap,
γairen jaxse buurul adim (in),
γaaneng dibes dabim am?
γap diben šabim am,
γapxandar baarsen γaxen jap,
γairen jaxse buurul adim (in),
γaaneng dibes dabim am?
ib diben šabim am,
ečikter baarsen γaxen jap,
γairen jaxse buurul adim (in),
γaaneng dibes dabim am?
say diben šabim am,
sanderdar baarsen γaxen jap,
γairen jaxse buurul adim (in),
γaaneng dibes dabim am?
bulux diben šabim am,
belterdar baarsen γaxen jap,
γairen jaxse buurul adim (in),
γaaneng dibes dabim am?
γer diben šabim am,
γergestar baarsen γaxen jap,
γaren jaxse buurul adim (in),
γaaneng dibes dabim am?

== See also ==
- Kyrgyz in China

== Works cited ==
- Brown, Keith & Ogilvie, Sarah, eds. (2010). Concise Encyclopedia of Languages of the World (rev. ed.). Elsevier. ISBN 978-0080877754.
- Fuyu County Civil Affairs Bureau (2021-01-19). 民俗宗教 [Folklore and Religion] (in Chinese). Fuyu County People's Government. Archived from the original on 2021-02-14.
- Hu, Zhen-hua & Imart, Guy (1987), Fu-Yü Gïrgïs: A tentative description of the easternmost Turkic language, Bloomington, Indiana: Indiana University Research Institute for Inner Asian Studies
- Janhunen, Juha (1996). Manchuria: An Ethnic History. Finno-Ugrian Society. ISBN 978-951-9403-84-7.
- Johanson, Éva Ágnes Csató & Johanson, Lars (2003) [1998]. The Turkic Languages. Routledge Language Family Series (Rev. ed.). Taylor & Francis. ISBN 9780203066102.
- Li, Yongsŏng; Ölmez, Mehmet & Kim, Juwon (2007). "Some Newly Identified Words in Fuyu Kirghiz (Part 1)". Ural-Altaische Jahrbücher. 21. Neue Folge: 141–169. ISSN 0174-0652.
- Pozzi, Alessandra; Janhunen, Juha Antero & Weiers, Michael, eds. (2006). Tumen jalafun jecen akū: Manchu Stories in Honour of Giovanni Stary. Tunguso Sibirica. Vol. 20. Harrassowitz Verlag. ISBN 978-3-447-05378-5.
- Tchoroev (Chorotegin), T. (2003). "The Kyrgyz". In Dani, Ahmad Hasan & Masson, Vadim Mikhaĭlovich (eds.). History of civilizations of Central Asia. Vol. V: Development in contrast: from the sixteenth to the mid-nineteenth century. Paris: UNESCO. pp. 109–125. ISBN 9789231038761.
- Wurm, Stephen A.; Mühlhäusler, Peter & Tryon, Darrell T., eds. (2011). Atlas of Languages of Intercultural Communication in the Pacific, Asia, and the Americas. de Gruyter. ISBN 9783110819724.
