= Koibal dialect =

Extinct Samoyedic variety of Kamas

Koibal
- койбале сека
- Native to: Russia
- Region: Sayan Mountains
- Ethnicity: Koibals
- Extinct: 19th century
- Language family: Uralic: Samoyedic; (core); Kamas–Selkup; Kamas; Koibal

Language codes
- ISO 639-3: –
- Glottolog: samo1299 Samoyed Koibal
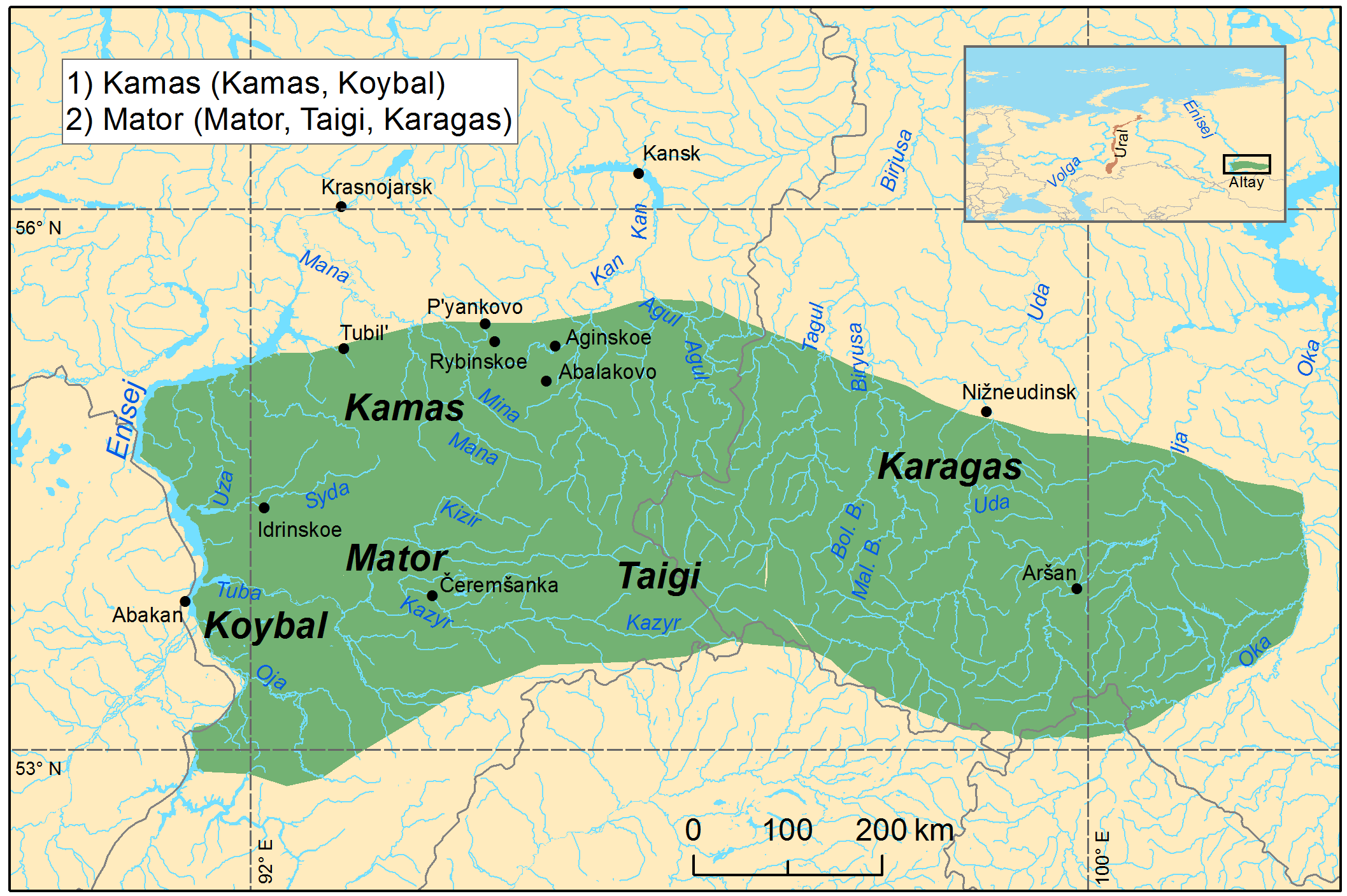
- Map of Sayan Samoyedic languages

The Koibal dialect is a dialect of the Kamas language or arguably another independent Sayan Samoyed language. About 600 words of the Koibal dialect are known, but there are no grammatical descriptions of Koibal. The vocabulary of Koibal is very similar to Kamas proper. The Koibal dialect died around the 19th century. The Koibals assimilated into Turkic tribes. There was a Koibal-Russian glossary published in 1806. It is possible that it has a SOV word order, as so does Kamas.

Matthias Castrén concluded that Koibal and Karagas have a Yeniseian substratum, after meeting with speakers who used Yeniseian words in their speech.

Kamas proper distinguishes the alveo-dental and palatal sibilants s, z vs. š, ž, however the Koibal dialect only has s and z.

== Vocabulary ==
| Koibal | English |
|---|---|
| kubö | dead |
| udžüga | small |
| majna | bear |
| jugo | a lot |
| paale | be able to |
| kuju | brain |
| dalaj | sea |
| büze | man |
| me | we |
| uja | meat |
| num | sky |
| naga | doesn't |
| too | lake |
| de | he |
| oda | hand |
| ne | arrow |
| ajo | warm |
