= Selkup =

Selkup may refer to:

- Selkup people, a people living between the Ob and Yenisei rivers in Siberia, Russia
- Selkup language, their language
