= Yu with diaeresis =

Cyrillic letter

- Ю̈ ю̈

Usage
- Writing system: Cyrillic
- Type: Alphabetic
- Language of origin: Southern Selkup
- Sound values: [ʲy]

Yu with diaeresis (Ю̈ ю̈; italics: Ю̈ ю̈) is a letter of the Cyrillic script.

Yu with diaeresis is used in the South Selkup (and formerly in the Karelian) languages. It represents the close front rounded vowel, typically represented as ⟨Ӱ ӱ⟩, before a palatalized consonant.

== See also ==
- Cyrillic characters in Unicode
