= El with acute =

Cyrillic letter

- Л́ л́

Usage
- Type: alphabetic
- Language of origin: Middle Ket Selkup
- Sound values: [lʲ]
- Alphabetical position: 19th

El with acute (Л́ л́) is a letter of the Cyrillic script, used in the writing of the Middle Ket dialect of the Selkup language.

== Usage ==
In Middle Ket Selkup, el with acute represents a palatalized version of [l], represented in IPA as [lʲ]. It was introduced in a 1998 dictionary by Jarmo Alatalo.
