= Northern Selkup =

Variety of Selkup language

- шöйӄумый эты šöľqumyt əty
- Native to: Russia
- Region: Yamalo-Nenets Autonomous Okrug, Krasnoyarsky Krai (Turukhansky District)
- Ethnicity: northern Selkups (ʃølʲqup)
- Native speakers: 600 (2019–2024)
- Language family: Uralic: Samoyedic; (core); Kamas–Selkup; Selkup; Northern Selkup
- Writing system: Cyrillic

Language codes
- ISO 639-3: –
- Glottolog: tazz1244
- ELP: Northern Selkup
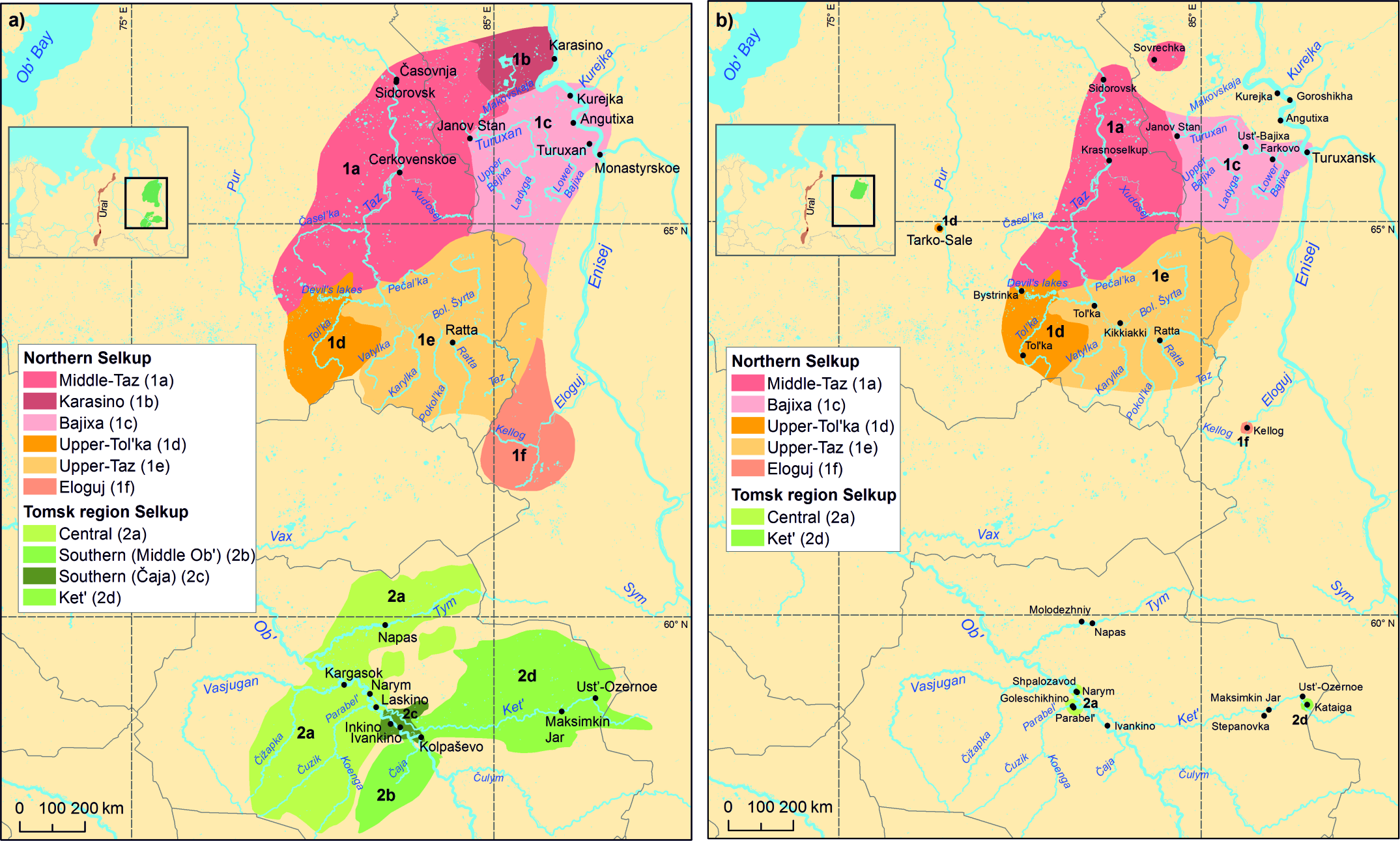
- Distribution of Selkup dialects

- Northern Selkup is classified as Severely Endangered by the UNESCO Atlas of the World's Languages in Danger

Northern Selkup is a Samoyedic language spoken in Yamalo-Nenets Autonomous Okrug and Krasnoyarsk Krai in Russia, by about 600 people. Despite institutional support and grassroots activism, its future "appears gloomy". Some villages have parents transmitting it to their children, but not most.

== Classification ==
It is considered to be a dialect of a greater Selkup language by most Russian sources, but an individual language by others. According to lexicostatistics, it can be considered to be an individual language. The Endangered Languages Project states that the differences between the Selkup dialects are "comparable to those between, for example, Ket, Yug, and Pumpokol".

== Dialects ==
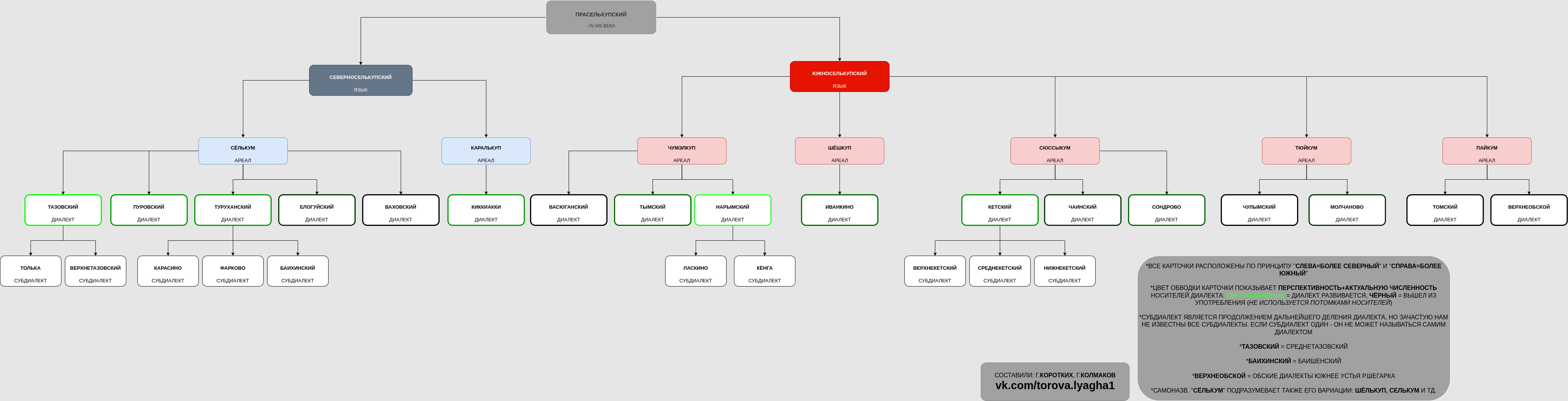
Classification of Selkup dialects

The dialect classification of Northern Selkup is as follows:

- Northern Selkup
  - Taz
    - Upper
    - Middle
  - Turukhansk
    - Baikha (Baisha)
    - Karasino
  - Tol'ka
  - Vakh

The full list of dialects is Upper Taz (around 250 speakers), Middle Taz (about 120 speakers), Baixa and Turukhan (about 40 speakers), and Jeloguj (1 speaker). Both Taz dialects are used in education.

== History ==
Northern Selkup developed from a 17th-century offshoot of the Tym dialect of Central Selkup.

== Phonology ==
There are 25 vowel and 16 consonant phonemes in the Taz dialect.

Taz Selkup consonants
	Labial	Dental	Palatal(ized)	Velar	Uvular
Nasals	m	n	nʲ	ŋ	(ɴ)
Plosives	p	t	tʲ	k	q
Fricatives	(f)	s	ʃʲ	(x)	(χ)
Trills		r			(ʀ)
Laterals		l	lʲ		
Approximant	w		j		

- Voicing is not phonemic. Stops and fricatives may be voiced between vowels or after sonorant consonants.
- The palatalized stop and fricative /tʲ/, /ʃʲ/ are most typically rendered as an alveolo-palatal affricate [tɕ] and fricative [ɕ]. Depending on the speaker, the former can be also realized as the stop [tʲ], the latter as a non-palatalized fricative, postalveolar [ʃ] or retroflex [ʂ].
- Before front vowels, palatalized variants of other consonants are also found.
- [ɴ] and [ʀ] are allophones of /q/ when occurring before nasals and liquids, respectively.
- The non-coronal stops /p/, /k/, /q/ have optional fricative allophones [f], [x], [χ] when occurring before /s/ or /ʃʲ/.
- Across morpheme boundaries, sandhi is widespread. This also occurs in all other dialects.

Taz Selkup vowels
		Front		Central	Back	
		Unrounded	Rounded	Unrounded	Rounded	
Tense	Close	i, iː	y, yː	ɨ, ɨː	u,	uː
Tense	Mid	e, eː	ø, øː	ɘ, ɘː	o, oː	
Tense	Open	æ, æː		a, aː		
Lax	Close	ɪ, ɪː		[ɪ̈ ~ ə]		
Lax	Mid	ɛ, ɛː		[ɪ̈ ~ ə]	ɔː	

- Vowel length is phonemic. /ɔː/ alone, deriving from proto-Selkup */aː/, has no short counterpart.
- The tenseness contrast, an innovation of northern Selkup, is independent of length (e.g. /i/, /iː/, /ɪ/, /ɪː/ all contrast).
- The full range of vowel quality contrasts is only possible in the initial syllable of a word: in later syllables, /e/ /ø/ /ɘ/ /y/ /ɨ/ of either length do not occur, nor does long /uː/. (Shown on a darker gray background.)
- The non-phonemic lax central vowel [ɪ̈ ~ ə] only occurs in unstressed non-first syllables; it is normally treated equivalent with short tense /ɨ/.
- Certain vowels cannot occur before certain consonants. For example, /i/, /iː/, /e/, /eː/ do not occur after /t/, /q/, /n/, /l/.

=== Stress ===
Stress in Selkup varies considerably from dialect to dialect for certain words,

Stress in Selkup is rarely phonemic. Some examples are [ˈkɨkɨ-tɨʎ] 'wanted, wanting'—[ˈkɨ-ˈkɨtɨʎ] 'riverless', and [ˈyr-t-æʃʲ] 'make fat'—[yr-ˈt-æʃʲ] 'lose'.

== Orthography ==
=== Pre-literate period ===
The Selkups, before the introduction of writing, used a rudimentary way of recording numbers; individual lines for units, crosses for tens, and stars for hundreds, as well as the usage of tamgas.

=== Latin script ===
In 1931, the first Northern Selkup alphabet, in the Latin script, was developed.

A a, B в, Ç ç, D d, E e, Ə ə, G g, Ƣ ƣ, I i, J j, K k, L l, M m, N n, Ŋ ŋ, O o, Ɵ ɵ, P p, Q q, R r, S s, Ş ş, T t, U u, W w, Y y, Z z, Ʒ ʒ, Ь ь, Æ æ

In the end, however, it was slightly modified. This version is the one in which literature was published in.

A a	Ā ā	B ʙ	Ç ç	D d	E e	Ə ə	Æ æ	F f	G g	H h	I i
Ь ь	J j	K k	L l	Ļ ļ	M m	N n	Ņ ņ	Ŋ ŋ	O o	Ɵ ɵ	P p
Q q	R r	S s	Ş ş	T t	Ţ ţ	U u	W w	Y y	Z z

The Middle Taz dialect was chosen as the base due to a large speaker base and minimal influence from Russian. Letters D d, F f, and H h were only used in loanwords.

The primer Ņarqь wəttь uses Ꞓ ꞓ and Ꞩ ꞩ instead of Ç ç and Ş ş.

=== Cyrillic script ===
In 1937, the alphabet, like all those of the languages of the Soviet Union, was transliterated into Cyrillic. The first such alphabet took the form of the Russian alphabet, with the extra letters аʼ, нг, оʼ, оа, уʼ, эʼ. Books were first published in this alphabet in 1940.

The next alphabet was introduced in 1953, in a primer. The alphabet itself took the form of the Russian alphabet with the extra letters еʼ, кʼ, нʼ, уʼ.

Following this, the only other literature in Northern Selkup until the 1980s was two songs in the collection "Северные россыпи", published in 1962.

Writing in the Northern Selkup language was revived in 1986 with the publication of a primer in the Middle Taz dialect, which was followed by other literature. Teaching was also resumed. The first dictionary, published in 1988, used the following alphabet.

А а, Б б, В в, Г г, Д д, Е е, Ё ё, Ж ж, З з, И и, й, К к, Ӄ ӄ, Л л, М м, Н н, Ӈ ӈ, О о, Ө ө, П п, Р р, С с, Т т, У у, Ӱ ӱ, Ф ф, Х х, Ц ц, Ч ч, Ш ш, Щ щ, ъ, Ы ы, ь, Э э, Ю ю, Я я

The letters Ӧ ӧ and Ә ә were introduced later.

Since the 2000s, with the introduction of the letters Ӓ ӓ and І і, the alphabet has taken the following form.

А а	Ӓ ӓ	Б б	В в	Г г	Д д	Е е	Ә ә	Ё ё	Ж ж	З з
И и	І і	Й й	К к	Ӄ ӄ	Л л	М м	Н н	Ӈ ӈ	O o	Ө ө
Ӧ ӧ	П п	Р р	С с	Т т	У у	Ӱ ӱ	Ф ф	Х х	Ц ц	Ч ч
Ш ш	Щ щ	Ъ ъ	Ы ы	Ь ь	Э э	Ю ю	Я я

Vowel length is indicated by a macron. Letters Б б, Г г, Д д, Ж ж, З з, Ф ф, Х х, Ц ц, Щ щ, Ъ ъ are only found in loanwords from Russian.
