= Daria Egereva =

Imprisoned indigenous rights and climate activist

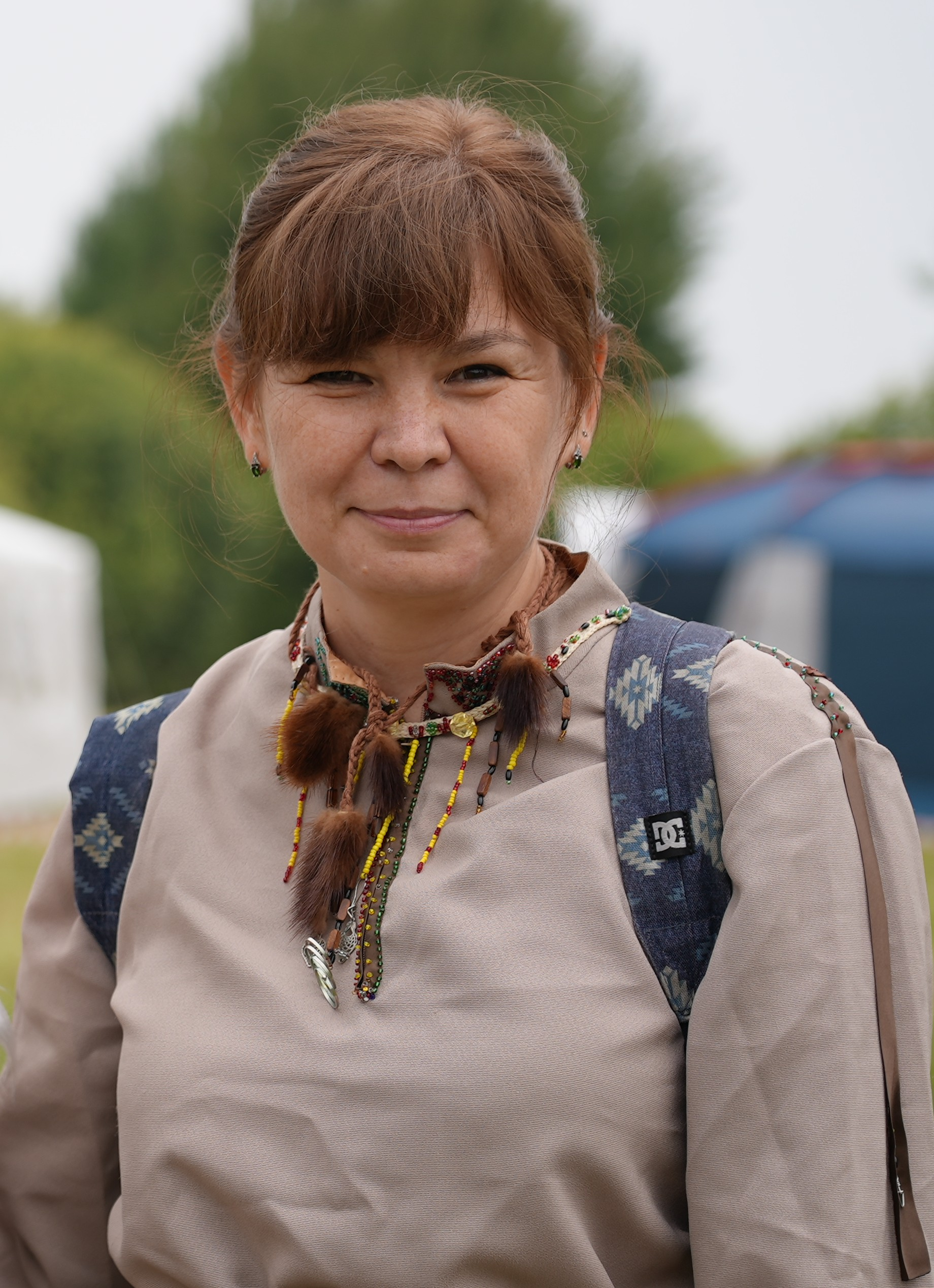
Daria Egereva (2022)

Daria Anatolyevna Egereva (Russian: Дарья Анатольевна Егерева, born April 7, 1977 in Kolpashevo) is an imprisoned indigenous rights and climate activist. She is of Selkup ethnicity and co-chair of the International Indigenous Peoples' Forum on Climate Change (IIPFCC). Egereva was last living in Moscow.

Since December 18, 2025 she is held by Russia in pre-trial detention on charges of extremism and terrorism which carry a sentence of 10 to 20 years of imprisonment. Her case has been widely reported internationally. Besides the IIPFCC and several NGOs, the UN High Commissioner for Human Rights is demanding her release. On April, 8th, 2026, Amnesty International published an urgent action demanding her immediate release. The Russian human rights organisation Memorial considers Egereva a polical prisoner. The incident has also been commented on by scientists.

== Life ==
Egereva was born 1977 in Kolpashevo in Tomsk oblast. She spent her childhood in Ivankino, a Selkup village on the Ob river in Kolpashevsky District, to the North east of Kolpashevo. With a population of little over 3500 members, the Selkups are one of the so-called indigenous minority peoples of Siberia.

Her mother, a teacher, was committed to preserving the Selkup language and culture within her community. Daria, while studying at Tomsk State Pedagogical University also developed an interest in these issues and became involved in advocating for the interests of the Selkup people.

Later she moved to Moscow, where she continued her activism. On December 17, 2025, upon returning from the 2025 UN Climate Change conference in Brazil, she was arrested.

== Activism ==
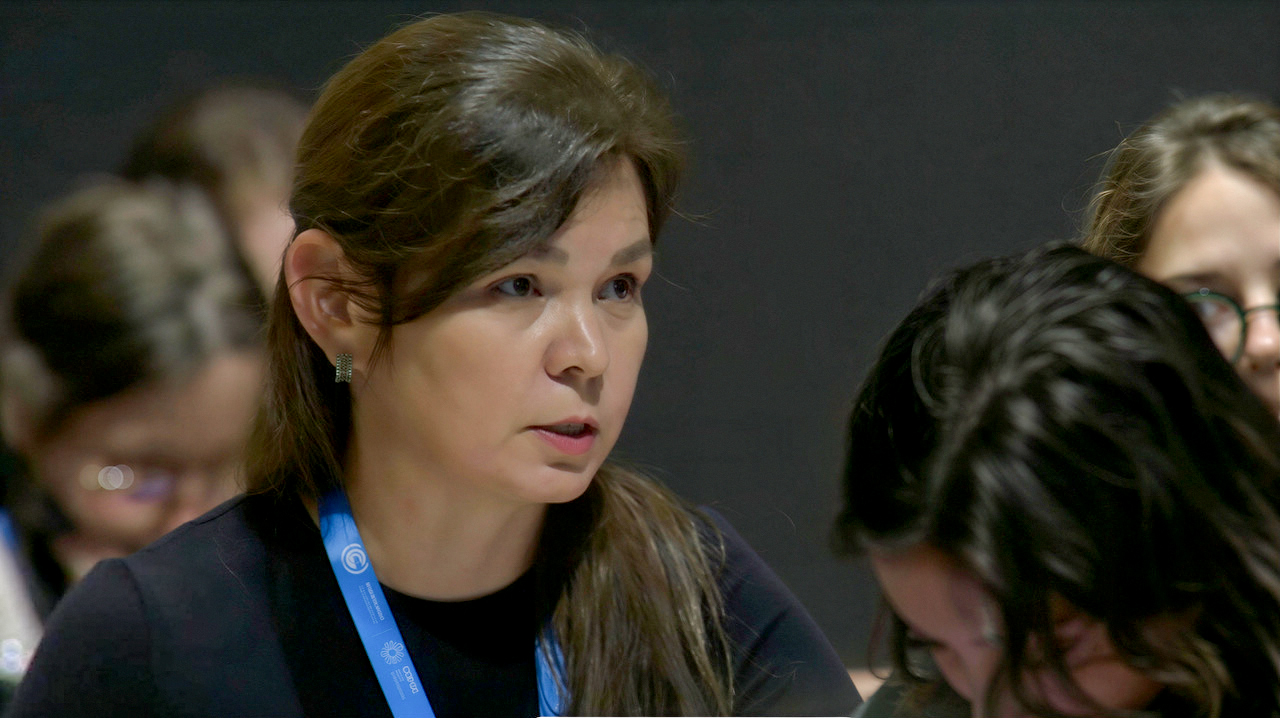
Daria Egereva at COP29 in Baku, Azerbaijan, in November 2024

For several years, Egereva has been instrumental in facilitating participation of indigenous peoples in multilateral policy processes. As a technical expert on climate change, she deals with issues of global climate cooperation and the involvement of indigenous peoples within UN contexts, including fora involving the Russian Federation

She held leadership positions within the official indigenous stakeholder group under the Framework Convention on Climate Change, the International Indigenous Peoples' Forum on Climate Change (IIPFCC). In 2023 she was elected co-chair of this body, representing indigenous peoples within UN climate negotiations. In this role, she participated in several Conferences of the Parties (COP) to the UN Framework Convention on Climate Change, including COP28, COP29 and COP30. Her work aims to foster constructive and orderly dialogue between indigenous representatives and government delegations within the official negotiation processes. She is also actively campaigning for greater participation by indigenous women in climate negotiations, as she did during her participation in COP30 in Brazil.

In addition, Egereva was a member of the Local Communities and Indigenous Peoples Platform (LCIPP) under the UNFCCC. In this context, she contributed to strengthening participatory formats between states and indigenous peoples in the development and implementation of climate policy measures. She also participated in the work of the Convention on Biological Diversity (CBD), the Expert Mechanism on the Rights of Indigenous Peoples (EMRIP) and the United Nations Permanent Forum on Indigenous Issues (UNPFII), contributing her expertise within the scope of the respective mandates of these bodies.

In addition to environmental issues, Egereva also drew attention to other problems affecting the Selkup people. A particular focus was on education issues. She campaigned for a reform of school education for the Selkups and called for the Selkup language to be used as a language of instruction in schools. Although, according to the law, Selkup language should be at least an optional subject, it is not being taught in practice. She also worked to strengthen female indigenous social entrepreneurs as a means of combating rural poverty.

== Prosecution ==
On 17 December 2025, several prominent indigenous activists from the Republics of Altai and Sakha, as well as from Tomsk, Murmansk and Kemerovo Oblasts, the Krasnoyarsk krai and St Petersburg, were raided by police forces. They were interrogated, some temporarily detained and their electronic devices confiscated. Investigations were launched against all of them.

This police action targeted representatives of the Selkup, Sámi, Tubalar, Chulym, Shor, Kumandin, Dolgan, Yukagir, Evenk and Nganasan peoples. All those affected had been campaigning for the rights of these indigenous peoples for many years and were involved to varying degrees in indigenous environmental activism within the United Nations. Many of those affected had also participated in other UN bodies and international meetings where issues of indigenous peoples' rights are being discussed.

Some of the detained were released immediately, but on 18 December Egereva and Natalia Leongardt were taken into pre-trial detention and charged with terrorism.

=== Aborigen Forum ===
Egereva's prosecution is based on her alleged affiliation with Aborigen Forum (Russian: Абориген-Форум, AF), an informal expert network on issues pertaining to the so-called indigenous minority peoples of the North, Siberia and the Far East. AF had been established in 2015 in response to the indigenous umbrella organisation RAIPON forfeiting its relative independence in 2013. AF monitored legislative processes and advocated for the rights, interests and cultures of these indigenous communities.

June 7, 2024, the Supreme Court published a ruling which deemed an organisation it called the 'Anti-Russia Separatist Movement' to be extremist. While there was no organisation by this name, the Russian Ministry of Justice in late July published a list of organisations that it would henceforth consider 'structural subdivisions' of said fictional organisation. AF was the only named organisation that was still based within Russia. Therefore, upon learning of the decision, it immediately dissolved itself.

It was only after its self-dissolution that in a closed hearing, the Supreme Court of the Russian Federation classified the "Forum of Free Nations of PostRussia as a terrorist organisation and ruled 172 organisations related to indigenous peoples and other minorities, including Aborigen Forum to be its 'structural subdivisions', resulting in their addition to the FSB's list of terrorist organisations. No evidence was provided to the public that Aborigen Forum was ever affiliated with the Free Nations of PostRussia Forum.

=== Court Proceedings ===
The start of the court proceedings against Egereva was announced for 11 February 2026. However, publicly available reports do not clearly indicate whether this was the main hearing or a preliminary hearing in the criminal proceedings. On 12 February, following a hearing, the Basmanny District Court in Moscow extended the pre-trial detention until mid-March 2026. On 12 March, the court decided to prolong the pre-trial detention for three more months, as requested by the prosecution. On 29 April, the detention was again extended until June 15.

In addition to Egereva, a second person involved in indigenous human rights activism has been charged, whose name has not been made public, but who is also active at the UN level.

=== Extremism and terrorism legislation ===
Egereva is charged with ‘activities aimed at undermining Russia’s territorial integrity and destroying its constitutional order’ on the basis of Article 205.5, Part 2 of the Russian Criminal Code, i.e. with 'extremism' and 'terrorism', which carry jail sentences of between 10 and 20 years.

According to international human rights bodies and observers, this legal norm is often applied in politically motivated proceedings to punish activities that are not necessarily linked to specific acts of violence, but rather concern participation in groups or acts of support that have been officially classified as ‘terrorist’. On this legal basis, Crimean Tatar Emir-Usein Kuku and Russian teenager Arseniy Turbin, among others, were prosecuted. both are considered prisoners of conscience by human rights organisations.

In its 2023 concluding observations regarding the Russian Federation, the UN Committee on the Elimination of Racial Discrimination (CERD) expressed concern about the overly broad and vague definition of ‘extremist activities’ in Russian legislation, which allows for its targeted application against civil society actors, particularly those advocating for the rights of indigenous peoples. The Committee warned that such laws are being used to intimidate, harass and prosecute human rights defenders and representatives of indigenous peoples for exercising their rights to freedom of expression and assembly. Similarly, the UN Committee on Civil and Political Rights strongly criticised Russia for its vague extremism legislation and its use to persecute minorities.

== Reactions ==
The arrest of Daria Egereva and the upcoming trial have given rise to a number of reactions, both in Russia and abroad.

=== Russia ===
On January 28, 2026, over a month after the police operation, RAIPON (The Russian Association of Indigenous Peoples of the North) president Alexander Novyukhov published a statement. Without naming Egereva, he referred to the affected indigenous activists as extremists and defended the government’s action against them.

=== International ===
The IIPFCC, which is demanding the immediate release of its co-chairs, describes the police raids and Egerewa's arrest in December as a targeted attack on indigenous leaders, constituting direct retaliation for their participation in United Nations processes and setting a dangerous precedent for the treatment of indigenous peoples who participate in global human rights and climate conferences.

Zoltán Nagy, professor of anthropology at Pécs University in Hungary described the police raid as a "spectacular manifestation" of how the Russian regime tried to sow discord between indigenous minorites in order to silence their voices. The aim of the repression is in his words, on the one hand, to intensify the suppression of dissenting opinions in Russia and, on the other hand, to facilitate the exploitation of natural resources in the indigenous peoples' settlement areas.

Russia Sámi activist Valentina Sovkina expressed similar sentiments. She is a member of the Permanent Forum on Indigenous Issues who was also affected by the police raids in December and subsequently went into exile in Norway. She was interviewed about the case by, among others, the state-owned Yleisradio in Finland. She suspects that the economic interests of Russia's rulers are behind the pressure. This is because the areas inhabited by indigenous peoples are rich in mineral resources. The local population is to be intimidated so that no critical voices are heard against the overexploitation of nature.

The German Society for Threatened Peoples sees Eegereva's arrest as exemplary of the systematic criminalisation of indigenous activists in Russia and considers the charges against her to be politically motivated.

The Observatory for the Protection of Human Rights Defenders at the International Federation for Human Rights, an international umbrella organisation of human rights organisations, and the World Organisation Against Torture deem Egereva's prosecution a case of "arbitrary deprivation of liberty" and "abusive prosecution".

Merja Kyllönen, Member of the Left Group in the European Parliament, pointed out in a parliamentary question on February 9, 2026 that Egereva's case should not be viewed in isolation, but in the context of a trend in Russia towards increasing pressure, criminalisation and arbitrary prosecution, which raises serious concerns about human rights, freedom of expression and the rights of indigenous peoples.

On February 9, 2026, the International Work Group for Indigenous Affairs published an open letter signed by a broad coalition of indigenous peoples, calling for the release of Daria Yegereva in an open letter to Vladimir Putin. The letter expressed concern that her detention undermines confidence that indigenous peoples can participate fully in recognised international processes and United Nations procedures without fear of reprisals.

Across all these international processes, Ms. Egereva’s activities were exclusively professional, non-violent, and institutional in nature, firmly grounded in dialogue and cooperation, and conducted in full accordance with officially recognized procedures.

— Signatories of the open letter

A spokesperson for the UN High Commissioner for Human Rights called for the immediate release of Egereva and all other persons detained for exercising their fundamental freedoms .

The detention of Daria Egereva raises concerns about arbitrary detention and the application of counterterrorism legislation against those exercising their fundamental freedoms.

— Thameen Al-Kheetan, spokesperson, UN High Commissioner for Human Rights
