= Tipene O'Regan =

New Zealand businessman and academic

Sir Tipene O'Regan ONZ CRSNZ
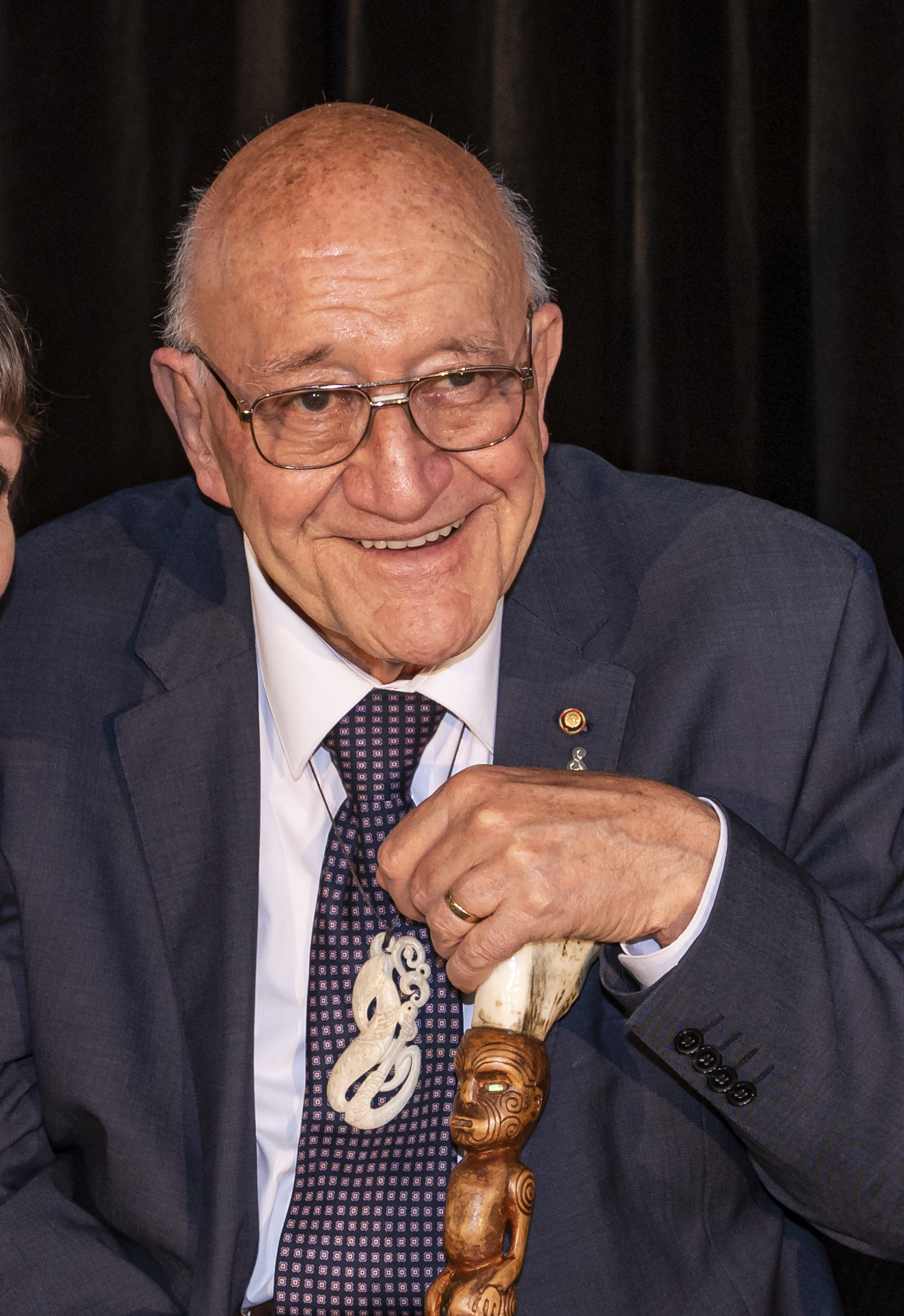
- O'Regan in 2020
- Born: Stephen Gerard O'Regan; 23 September 1939 (age 86); New Zealand
- Known for: Chairman Ngāi Tahu Māori Trust Board
- Relatives: Hana O'Regan (daughter); Rolland O'Regan (father); Patrick O'Regan (grandfather); Kera Sherwood-O'Regan (granddaughter)

Sir Stephen Gerard "Tipene" O'Regan ONZ CRSNZ (born 23 September 1939) is a New Zealand academic, company director and former chairman of the Ngāi Tahu Māori Trust Board.

== Biography ==
=== Early life and career ===
O'Regan is the son of surgeon Rolland O'Regan and Rena Ruiha (née Bradshaw). His mother was of the Ngāi Tahu tribe and was raised in Bluff. O'Regan was raised in Wellington. He studied at Victoria University of Wellington and teachers' college, then worked as a primary school teacher for two years. He returned to teachers' college as a lecturer in 1968 and remained in that role until 1983.

In 1974, he stood alongside his father Rolland on the Labour Party ticket for the Wellington Harbour Board. He polled well but did not win a seat.

He was appointed to the Ngāi Tahu Māori Trust Board in 1976. He was on the board for 22 years and was chair for 13 years. He guided the board to successful land and sea fisheries claims before the Waitangi Tribunal, culminating in the Tribunal's reports of 1991 and 1992. He later led claim settlement negotiations leading to the 1998 settlement which made extensive provision for customary rights in fisheries and other natural resources. He is a director of a wide range of South Island Māori enterprises.

In the 1994 Queen's Birthday Honours, O'Regan was appointed a Knight Bachelor, for services to the Māori people and the community. In 2019, he was made a Companion of Royal Society Te Apārangi.

=== Later activities ===
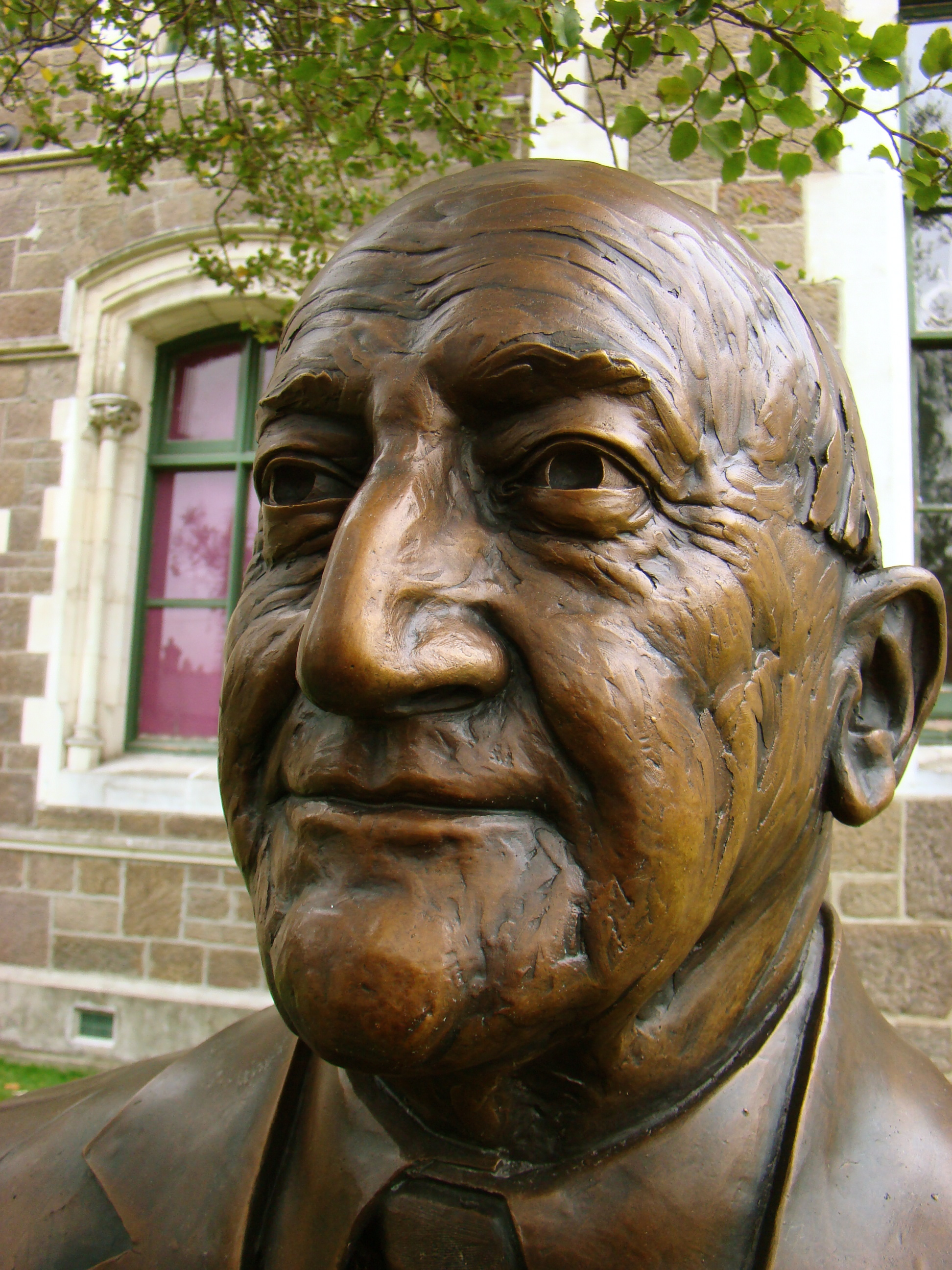
Bronze bust of O'Regan, part of the Twelve Local Heroes sculpture

O'Regan was an associate lecturer and assistant vice chancellor (Māori) at the University of Canterbury in Christchurch, New Zealand, associated with both the history and Māori departments. He was awarded an honorary D.Litt. by the University of Canterbury in 1992. In March 2009, O'Regan was commemorated as one of the Twelve Local Heroes of Christchurch, and a bronze bust of him was unveiled outside the Christchurch Arts Centre.

He was a director of Milford Dart Ltd, a company which proposed a tunnel through the Southern Alps to more than halve the time taken to negotiate the road between resort centres Queenstown and Milford Sound. The proposal had Department of Conservation approval but there was opposition because the tunnel would be in a National Park and UNESCO World heritage area. O'Regan argued the "absurdity of spending over 11 hours in a day to go to Milford from Queenstown", but in July 2013, the Minister of Conservation, Nick Smith, declined the proposal because of significant environmental impacts.

O'Regan was a member of the New Zealand Geographic Board from 1985 to 2013, and from 2010 he has co-chaired the Constitutional Advisory Panel, which is seeking public input on constitutional reform in New Zealand.

In the 2022 Queen's Birthday and Platinum Jubilee Honours, O'Regan was appointed an additional Member of the Order of New Zealand, for services to New Zealand. His granddaughter is the climate activist Kera Sherwood-O'Regan.
