= Southern Selkup =

Samoyedic language

- Tomsk region Selkup, South-Central Selkup
- сӱccӱ ӄумыт әты, шӧш ӄумыт әты, тӱй ӄумыт әты tüj qumyt əty, šöš qumyt əty, śüssü qumyt əty, tüjqum, šöšqum, śüssogum
- Native to: Russia
- Region: Tomsk Oblast
- Ethnicity: southern Selkups
- Native speakers: 7 (2019–2024); 1 (2015)
- Revival: numbers increasing
- Language family: Uralic: Samoyedic; (core); Kamas–Selkup; Selkup; Southern Selkup
- Dialects: Chumelkup; Sheshkup; Syusyukum; Upper Ob

Language codes
- ISO 639-3: –
- Glottolog: sout3262
- ELP: Southern Selkup
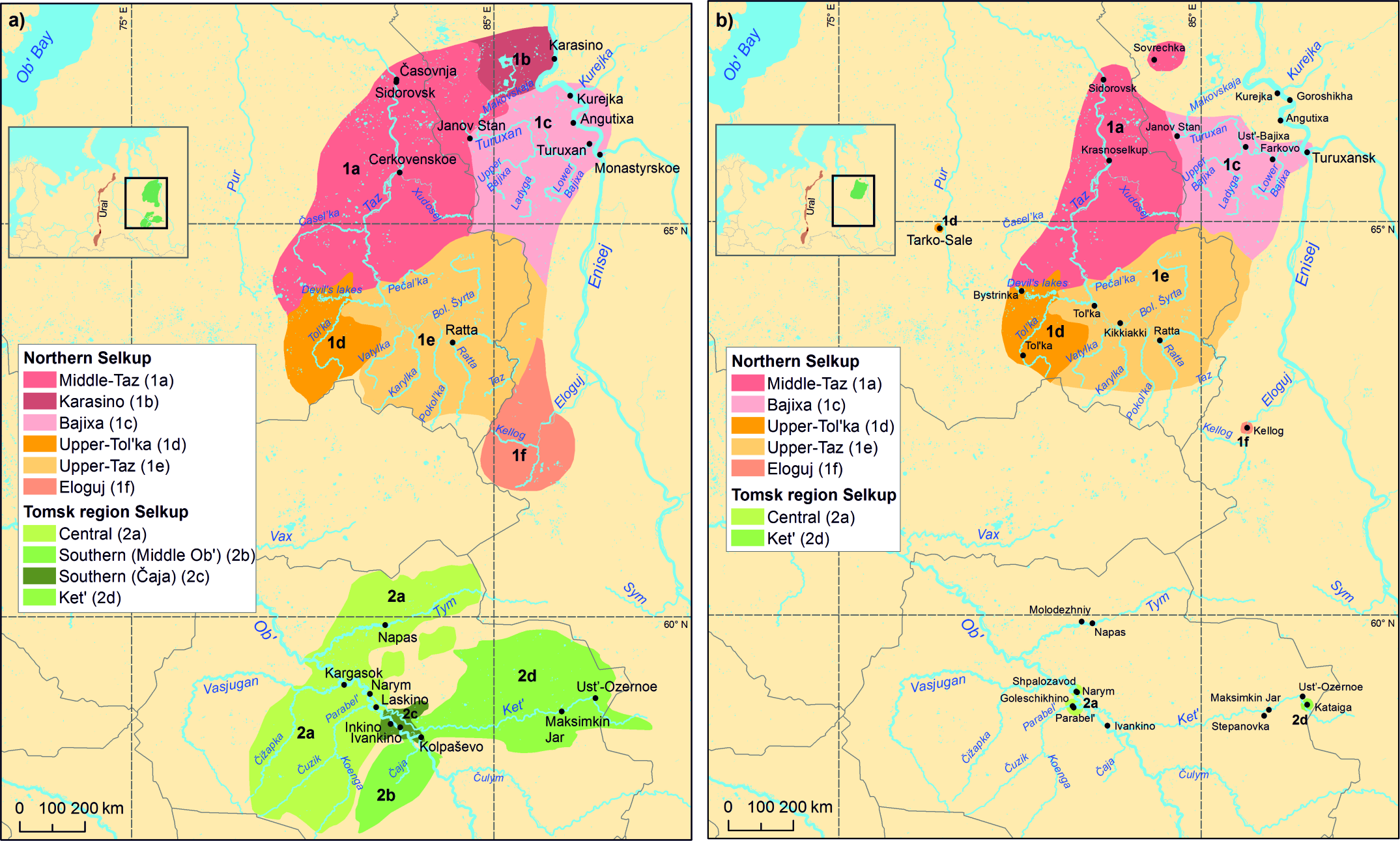
- Distribution of Selkup dialects

- Southern Selkup is classified as Critically Endangered by the UNESCO Atlas of the World's Languages in Danger

Southern Selkup is a group of dialects spoken in Tomsk Oblast and Krasnoyarsk Krai in Russia. There are four main groups, Chumelkup, Sheshkup, Syusyukum and Upper Ob. It is moribund today, with only about 7 speakers, but it is being revived.

== Classification ==
It is considered to be a dialect of a greater Selkup language by most Russian sources, but an individual language by others. The Endangered Languages Project states that the differences between the Selkup dialects are "comparable to those between, for example, Ket, Yug, and Pumpokol".

== Dialects ==
- Southern Selkup
  - Chumelkup (чу́мэлӄу́п)
    - Tym
    - Vasyugan
    - Narym
      - Laskino
      - Tyukhterevo (actually Narym)
      - Parabel (Chuzik possibly distinct)
      - lower Ob
      - Kyonga
  - Sheshkup (шё̄шӄуп)
    - Igotkino (Togur)
    - Ivankino
    - Inkino
  - Syusyukum (сӱ̄ссыӷӯм)
    - Ket
      - Upper Ket
      - Middle Ket
      - Lower Ket
    - Chaya
    - Sondrovo
  - Upper Ob (тюйкум, пайкум)
    - Upper Ob (Molchanovo)
    - Chulym
    - Tom (пайкум)

== Phonology ==
=== Vowels ===
	Front		Central	Back
	unrounded	rounded	Central	Back
Close	⟨и⟩ i ⟨ӣ⟩ iː	⟨ӱ⟩ y ⟨ӱ̄⟩ yː	⟨ы⟩ ɨ ⟨ы̄⟩ ɨː	⟨у⟩ u ⟨ӯ⟩ uː
Mid	⟨э⟩ e ⟨э̄⟩ eː	⟨ӧ⟩ œ ⟨ӧ̄⟩ œː	⟨(э/ы)⟩ ə	⟨о⟩ o ⟨о̄⟩ oː
Open	⟨э/ӓ/(ӭ)⟩ ɛ		⟨а⟩ a ⟨а̄⟩ aː	
Open	⟨ӓ⟩ æ ⟨ӓ̄⟩ æː			

=== Consonants ===
Consonants in italics are not present in all dialects.

		Labial		Dental		Lateral	Palatal		Velar		Uvular	
		plain	pal.	plain	pal.	Lateral	plain	pal.	plain	pal.	plain	pal.
Plosive	voiceless	p	pʲ	t	tʲ				k	kʲ	q	qʲ
Plosive	voiced	b	bʲ	d	dʲ				g	gʲ	ɢ	ɢʲ
Fricative	voiceless	f	fʲ	s	sʲ		ʃ		h	hʲ	ɣ	ɣʲ
Fricative	voiced	v	vʲ	z	zʲ		ʒ					
Affricate	voiceless						t͡ʃ	t͡ʃʲ				
Affricate	voiced						d͡ʒ	d͡ʒʲ				
Nasal		m	mʲ	n	nʲ				ŋ			
Liquid				r	rʲ	l		lʲ				
Semivowel		w					j					

== Orthography ==
=== Pre-literate ===
Before the introduction of writing, Selkups would carve signs to signify numbers, as well as tamgas.

Selkup texts were first published in the late 17th century with the publication of The Lord's Prayer in the southern Ob dialects by Nicolaes Witsen. Wordlists of Selkup were published in the 18th century, by Daniel Gottlieb Messerschmidt, Philip Johan von Strahlenberg, Gerhard Friedrich Müller and Fyodor Zheltukhin. One of the Ob dialects was described in a grammar by the Samoyedist Matthias Castrén in the mid-19th century. Latin and Cyrillic transcriptions were used for these works.

== Morphology ==
=== Case ===
The following case system is for the Narym dialect.

маҗь 'forest', ӄуп 'person'
Case name		Ending	Meaning	Example	Meaning of the example
Nominative case		∅	subject	маҗь	forest (as a subject)
Accusative case		-п, -м (Note: rare)	direct object	ма́җеп	forest (as an object)
Genitive case		-т, -н (Note: rare)	possession	ма́җет	of a forest
Dative case	animate	-н	indirect object (animate)	ӄун, ӄумн	to the person
Dative case	inanimate	-нд	indirect object (inanimate)	маҗӧ́нд	to the forest
Inessive case	animate	-нан	the X has	ӄу́нан	the person has
Inessive case	inanimate	-ӷэт/-ӄэт	in	маҗӧ́ӷэт	in the forest
Elative case		-эутэ/-утэ	out of, from, along	маҗӧ́утэ	out of the forest
Instrumental-comitative case		-ӽе/-хе, -э́ (Note: with nouns denoting means of transport, always stressed)	with	маҗьӽе́	with the forest
Abessive case		-галк/-калк	without	маҗьга́лк	without the forest
Translative case		-тӄо	into	маҗетӄо́	[turn] into a forest
Exessive case (Note: Almost out of use)	animate	-ндо/-эндо	from	ку́ндо	from the person
Exessive case	inanimate	-ӷэндо/-ӄэндо	from	маҗӧ́ӷэндо	from the forest

== Vocabulary ==
=== Numerals ===
	Narym	Sheshkup	Upper Ob	Chaya	Middle Ket
1	о́ӄӄэр	о́ккыр	оккэр	о́кыр	оккыр, оккы
2	шэд	шэд	сэдааг	сыдъя́г	шитты
3	на́гур	на̄гур	нэар	на́гур	на̄гур, на̄р
4	тэт	тэ̄т	тиэтт	тэт	те̄тты
5	хомбла́	сомбла́	собблаг	со́мблак	сомбыле, сомбылеӈӷы
6	му́ктэт, му́хтэт, му́фтэт	му́ктэт	мукт	му́гтык	муктут
7	хельҗь	се̄льдь	сиэлдь	се́льҗь	се̄лд́у
8	шэд-ча́ӈгвет	шэдтя́ткет, шэдтя́тгвэт	сэддед	сыдча́дгэт	шиттыт́а̄дыгыт
9	о́ӄӄэр-ча́ӈгвет	о́ккыртя́ткет, о́ккыртя́тгвэт	оккэрдед	о́кырча́дгэт	оккырт́а̄дыгыт
10	кӧт	кӧ̄т	кiод	кӧт	кӧ̄т
11	о́ӄӄэр-гойгве́т	оккыргвэ́йет	оккургойет	о́кырго́ет	оккыргвэйгӧ̄т
12	шэ́дэ-гойгве́т	шэдгвэ́йет	сэдгойет	сыдыго́ет	шиттыгвэйгӧ̄т
13	на́гур-гойгве́т	на̄гургвэ́йет	нэаргойет	на́гурго́ет	на̄ргвэйгӧ̄т
14	тэ́тэ-гойгве́т	тэтгвэ́йет	тиэттгойет	тэ́тго́ет	те̄ттыгвэйгӧ̄т
15	хомбла́-гойгве́т	сомблагвэ́йет	собблагойет	со́мблаго́ет	сомблегвэйгӧ̄т
16	му́хтэт-гойгве́т	му́ктэтгвэ́йет	муктэгойет	му́гтыго́ет	муктугвэйгӧ̄т
17	хельҗь-гойгве́т	се̄льдьгвэ́йет	сиэлдегойет	се́льҗьго́ет	се̄л́дугвэйгӧ̄т
18	шэд-ча́ӈгвет-гойгве́т	шэдтя́тгвэтгвэ́йет	сэддедгойет	сыдчеса́рым	шиттыт́ассисса̄рым
19	о́ӄӄэр-ча́ӈгвет-гойгве́т	о́ккыртя́тгвэтгвэ́йет	оккэргойет	о́кырчеса́рым	оккырт́ассиса̄рым
20	шэда́ро, шэд кӧт	шэдса́ру, шэд кӧт	сэссаар	сыдса́рым	сисса̄рым
21	о́ӄӄэр-гой-шэда́ро, шэда́ро о́ӄӄэр	шэдса́ру о́ккыр	сэссаар оккэр, оккэр куай сэссаар	о́кыргвассыдса́рым	оккыргвэйсисса̄рым
22	шэ́дэ-гой-шэда́ро	шэдса́ру шэд	сэссаар сэдааг	сы́дыгвассыса́рым	шиттыгвэйсисса̄рым
23	на́гур-гой-шэда́ро	шэдса́ру на̄гур	сэссаар нэар	на́гургвассыса́рым	на̄ргвэйсисса̄рым
24	тэ́тэ-гой-шэда́ро	шэдса́ру тэ̄т	сэссаар тиэтт	тэ́тгвассыса́рым	те̄ттыгвэйсисса̄рым
25	хомбла́-гой-шэда́ро	шэдса́ру сомбла́	сэссаар собблаг	со́мблагвассыда́рым	сомблегвэйсисса̄рым
26	му́хтэт-гой-шэда́ро	шэдса́ру му́ктэт	сэссаар мукт	му́гтыгвассыса́рым	муктугвэйсисса̄рым
27	хельҗь-гой-шэда́ро	шэдса́ру се̄льдь	сэссаар сиэлдь	се́льҗьгвассыса́рым	се̄л́дугвэйсисса̄рым
28	шэд-ча́ӈгвет-гой-шэда́ро	шэдса́ру шэдтя́ткет	сэссаар сэддед	сы́дыча́нагса́рым	шиттыт́анна̄рса̄рым
29	о́ӄӄэр-ча́ӈгвет-гой-шэда́ро	шэдса́ру о́ккыртя́ткет	сэссаар оккэрдед	о́кырча́нагса́рым	оккырт́анна̄рса̄рым
30	нага́ро	нагурса̄ру, на̄гур кӧт	нэарсаар	нагса́рым	на̄рса̄рым
40	тэфа́ро, тэха́ро	тэ́ттыса̄ру, тэт кӧт	тэссаар	тэса́рым	те̄сса̄рым
50	хомбла́ро	сомбласа̄ру, сомбла́ кӧт	соббсаар	со́мбласа́рым	сомбылеса̄рым
60	муха́ро, муфа́ро	му́ктэтса̄ру, му́ктэт кӧт	муксаар	мугса́рым	мукса̄рым
70	хельҗя́ро	се̄льдьса̄ру, се̄льдь кӧт	сэссаар	сейса́рым	се̄за̄рым
80	шэд-ча́ӈгвет кӧт	шэдтя́рыт кӧт	сэддеултон	сыса́рмолчалто́н	шиттыса̄рт́а̄лдо̄н, шиттыт́а̄ткӧ̄тса̄рым
90	о́ӄӄэр-ча́ӈгвет кӧт	оккыртя́рыт кӧт	оккэрдеултон	о́кырса́рмолчалто́н	оккырса̄рт́а̄лдо̄н, оккырт́а̄ткӧ̄тса̄рым
100	тот	то̄н	тон	тон	то̄н
1000	тонкӧ́т, кӧнто́т, тоткӧ́т	кӧттон	кiоттон	кӧт тон	кӧ̄тто̄н
