= Kera Sherwood-O'Regan =

New Zealand climate-change, indigenous-rights and disabilities advocate

- Born: c. 1993; South Island
- Known for: Climate change activist
- Relatives: Tipene O'Regan (grandfather)

Kera Sherwood-O'Regan is a Māori woman from the South Island of New Zealand concerned with climate change and indigenous rights. She is a disability advocate. At COP25 she told the delegates to "Stop taking up space with your false solutions and get out of our way". In 2023 she became one of that year's BBC 100 Women.

== Life ==
Sherwood-O'Regan is Māori from Te Waipounamu (the South Island of New Zealand). She is a member of the Kāi Tahu iwi and she was born in about 1993 and she has a well connected family in New Zealand. Her mother is Viv Sherwood and her father is the Tūhura Otago Museum curator Gerard O’Regan. Her grandfather is the academic Sir Tipene O'Regan. Her education included studying medicine and one of her concerns is health. She is member of the board of Ora Taiao who are an organisation of health professionals championing action to mitigate climate change.

At COP25, she protested to the organisation and the media noting that indigenous people were on the platform for the opening ceremony but they were then ignored or used as "tokens". Special rules were applied she said and human rights were being ignored. She said on behalf of the International Indigenous Peoples Forum on Climate Change that "We are experts on climate. We are the kaitiaki, the stewards of nature". The indigenous people have no official representation as only nations have official delegates. At COP25 she was promised that she could speak. She addressed the conference long after it was meant to finish. The stalled agreements had left many sleeping under tables and missing flights. She had paid for her own flights from her own savings. She got the media's attention when she told the delegates that the International Indigenous Peoples Forum on Climate Change wanted them to "Stop taking up space with your false solutions and get out of our way".

In 2020, there was an election in New Zealand. O'Regan was asked as "a leading commentator" by the British newspaper The Guardian to give her verdict in the previous administration. She gave Jacinda Ardern's government a "C+" noting that they made the pronouncements but they did not make changes. One aspect she did like was the Green Party who had ambitiously named their Zero Carbon Act but it was "lacklustre".

She was named as one of the BBC 100 Women for 2023 in recognition of her work on climate change and indigenous rights and as a disability advocate.
