= International Indigenous Peoples Forum on Climate Change =

The International Indigenous Peoples Forum on Climate Change (IIFPCC) is the representative body of indigenous peoples participating in the United Nations Framework Convention on Climate Change (UNFCCC).

== History ==
The Indigenous Women’s Biodiversity Network was formed in 1998 during COP4. The network was at COP13 in 2007.

Indigenous peoples began engaging with the UNFCCC in 2000, during a Subsidiary Bodies meetings in Lyon, France on September 8, 2000. NGOs with UNFCCC observer status nominate participants for sessions of UNFCCC bodies. Capacity building for indigenous peoples to engage with United Nations processes and natural resource management, including promoting traditional knowledge, has supported increasing participation.

Representatives said IIFPCC proposals were mostly ignored at the 2010 United Nations Climate Change Conference that resulted in the Cancún Agreement, in which the need for safeguards for local communities in REDD+ was documented in Annex 1.

Indigenous representatives developed the Oaxaca Action Plan of Indigenous Peoples: From Cancún to Durban and Beyond, a plan for indigenous peoples’ advocacy and lobbying from COP17 through to the World Conference on Indigenous Peoples at UN Headquarters in 2014. The plan aimed to address the lack of implementation of elements of the Cancún Agreement about indigenous peoples’ human rights and their participation in making climate change policies.

The IIFPCC has asked the SBSTA for more effective participation of indigenous peoples and respect for indigenous traditional knowledge in REDD+ monitoring systems. It has articulated links between climate change mitigation and adaptation projects and human rights. It has called for the Green Climate Fund to be more transparent and for greater financial support of indigenous peoples' natural resource management, monitoring and participation in governance.

As we always reiterate, most of the remaining forests in the world today are found in Indigenous Peoples’ customary-owned or managed territories, lands and resources. In addressing climate change, we insist that non-carbon benefits and non-market approaches should be supported in all aspects of the process and should be interconnected with the UNFCCC REDD+ safeguards as agreed to by the Parties in Cancun.

Non carbon benefits should be defined within a human rights framework including respect for, and recognition of, the rights of indigenous peoples to lands, territories, natural resources, self-determination, and our unique world views, traditional knowledge and customary governance systems in relation to the forests with our immeasurable cultural and spiritual values for sustenance consistent with the UN Declaration on the Rights of Indigenous Peoples (UNDRIP).

Parties to the Convention must implement the safeguards adopted in Cancun, as these are mandatory and essential to the success of REDD+ implementation in all phases. In addition, community-based monitoring and information systems by indigenous peoples are equally important as an effective way to monitor the non-carbon benefits and implementation of safeguards.

— Grace Balawag of Tebtebba and the Indigenous Peoples Partnership on Climate Change and Forests, speaking on behalf of the IIFPCC

A new global UNFCC initiative is underway to reduce greenhouse gas emissions released during deforestation, due to a concern that current regulations restrict the ability of native people to regulate the forests that are on their own land. The initiative is called Reducing Emissions from Deforestation and Degradation in Developing Countries. The UNFCC hopes that this initiative may lead to billions of dollars of annual payment for carbon emissions avoided by conservation efforts.

== Notable people ==
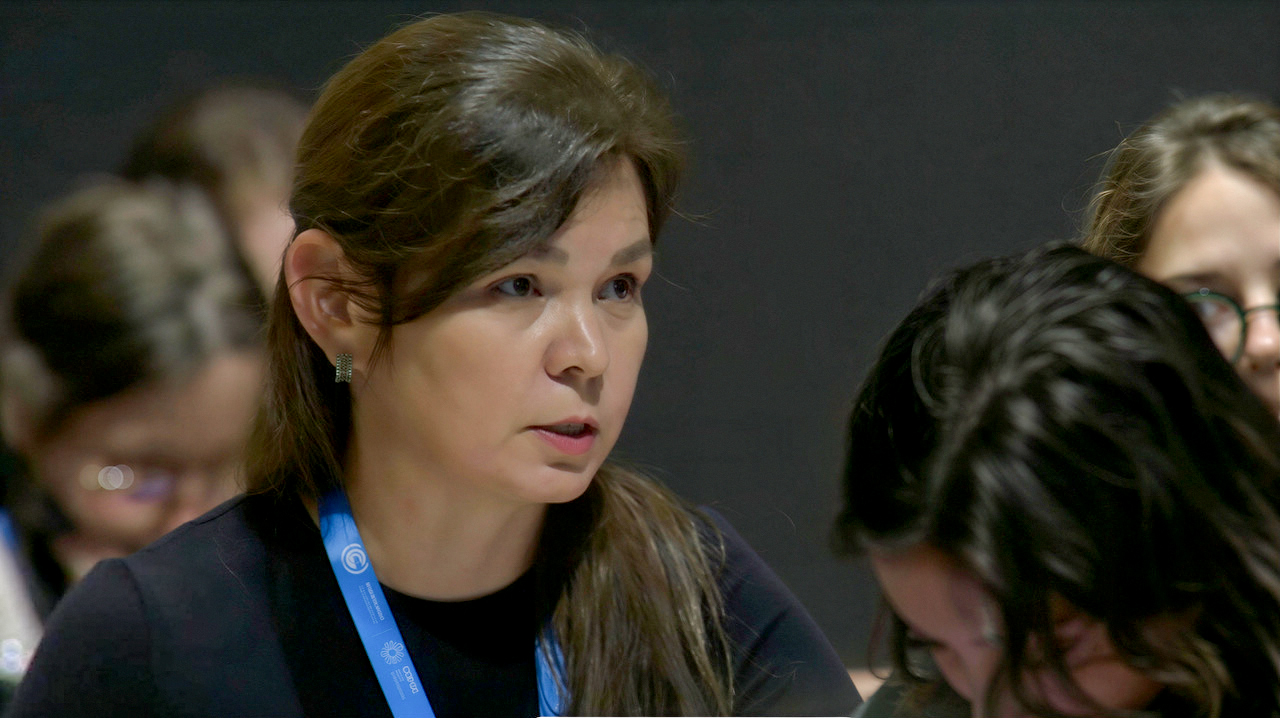
Daria Egereva at COP29 (Photo: Olga Kostrova)

Kera Sherwood-O’Regan from Te Waipounamu has been involved from COP23 in this work. In 2023 she and her work were recognised as one of the BBC 100 Women in 2023.

=== Daria Egereva ===
On 17 December 2025, the IIPFCC Co-Chair Daria Egereva, a representative of the Selkup people of Siberia, was arrested in Russia shortly after returning from the UN Climate Change Conference in Belém and has been held in pre-trial detention in Russia since 18 December 2025. She has been accused of extremism and terrorism and faces a possible sentence of up to 20 years in prison. The Russian human rights organization Memorial has designated Egereva as a political prisoner. The IIPFCC has called for her release.
