= Selkup languages =

Samoyedic language of Siberia

Selkup
- Geographic distribution: Yamalo-Nenets Autonomous Okrug, Krasnoyarsk Krai (Turukhansky District), Tomsk Oblast, Russia
- Ethnicity: Selkup people
- Native speakers: 600 (2020 census)
- Linguistic classification: Uralic: Samoyedic; (core); Kamas–Selkup; Selkup
- Subdivisions: Northern; Southern

Language codes
- ISO 639-2 / 5: sel
- ISO 639-3: sel
- Glottolog: selk1253
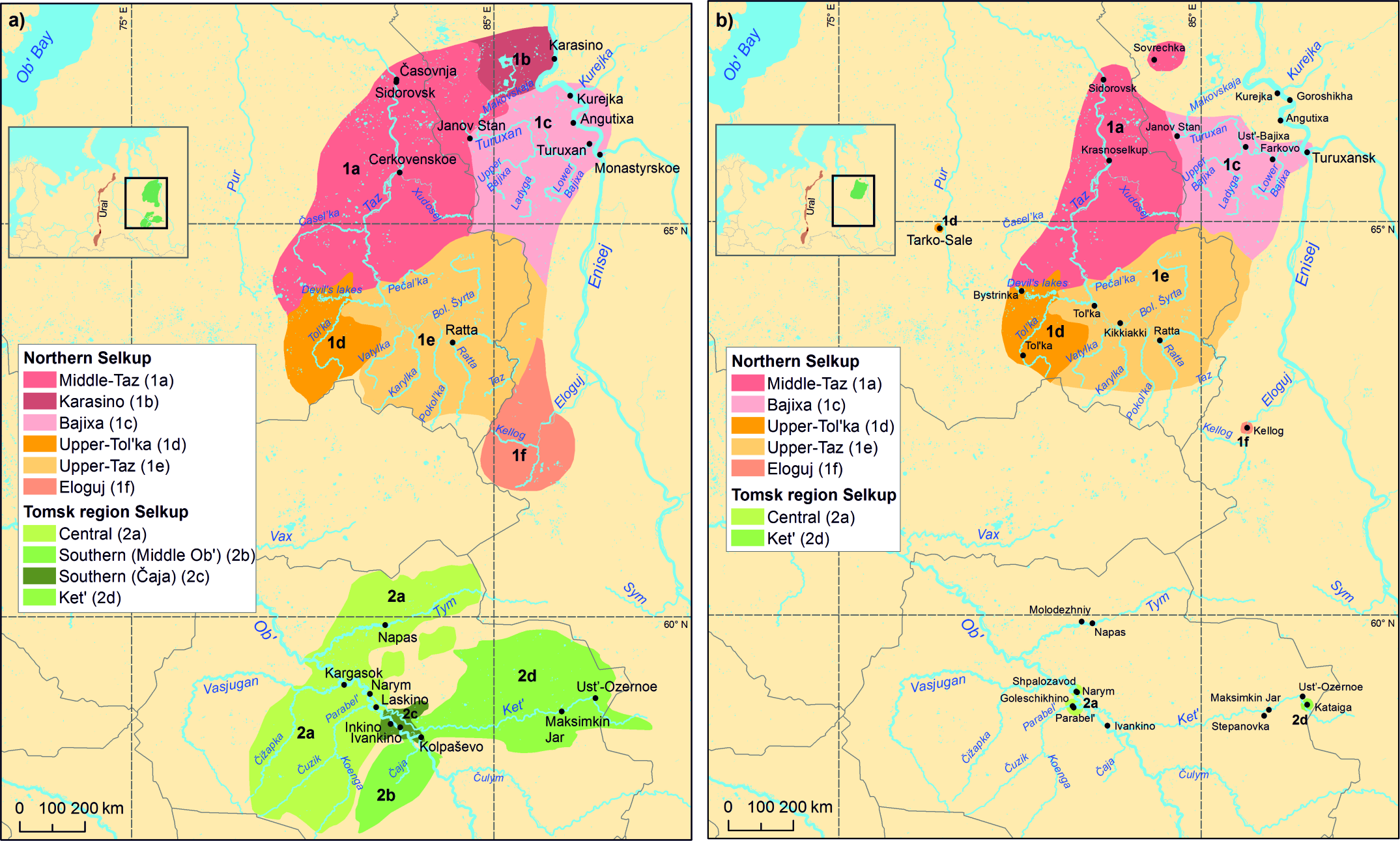
- Traditional (a) and current (b) distribution of Selkup

Selkup is the group of languages of the Selkups, belonging to the Samoyedic group of the Uralic language family. It is spoken by some 600 people (2022 est.) in the region between the Ob and Yenisei Rivers (in Siberia). The language name Selkup comes from the Russian селькуп, based on the native name used in the Taz dialect, шӧльӄумыт әты (šöľqumyt əty lit. 'forest-man language'). Different dialects use different native names.

== Language situation ==
As a result of linguistic marginalization and language shift, only a portion out of the general Selkup population (consisting of perhaps 3500 individuals today) speak the native language today.

Although Russia's Federal language legislation for the Indigenous Small-Numbered Peoples formally guarantees some language rights even for small ethnic groups, Selkup language teaching is not included in basic education. Also at the autonomous district level, laws on the native languages of the indigenous small-numbered peoples of the North have been adopted, including for Selkup, but so far without practical implementation.

A prominent advocate for improving this situation and reforming school education for the Selkups, including the implementation of Selkup-language instruction, has been Daria Egereva, who is also known as Co-Chair of the International Indigenous Peoples Forum on Climate Change (IIPFCC), an official caucus representing Indigenous peoples within the framework of the United Nations Framework Convention on Climate Change (UNFCCC) and the UN climate negotiations.

== Dialects ==
Selkup is an extensive dialect continuum whose ends are no longer mutually intelligible. The three main varieties are the Taz (Northern) dialect (тазовский диалект, tazovsky dialekt), which became the basis of the Selkup written language in the 1930s, Tym (Central) dialect (тымский диалект, tymsky dialekt), and Ket dialect (кетский диалект, ketsky dialekt). It is not related to the Ket language.

Some have proposed to split Selkup into two different languages, termed Northern Selkup and Southern Selkup. According to the Endangered Languages Project, the differences between dialects are "comparable to those between, for instance, Ket, Yug, and Pumpokol".

== Works cited ==
- Helimski, Eugene (1998). "Selkup". In Abondolo, David (ed.). The Uralic Languages. London: Routledge. pp. 548–579. ISBN 0-415-08198-X.
- Kazakevič, Olga (2022). "Selkup". The Oxford Guide to the Uralic Languages. Oxford University Press. pp. 777–816. doi:10.1093/oso/9780198767664.003.0038.
