= Selkup people =

Samoyedic ethnic group of northern Siberia

Selkup
чумэлӷу́ла, тюйкула, шё̄шӄула, сӱ̄ссыӷӯла, шöйӄумыт
- Flag

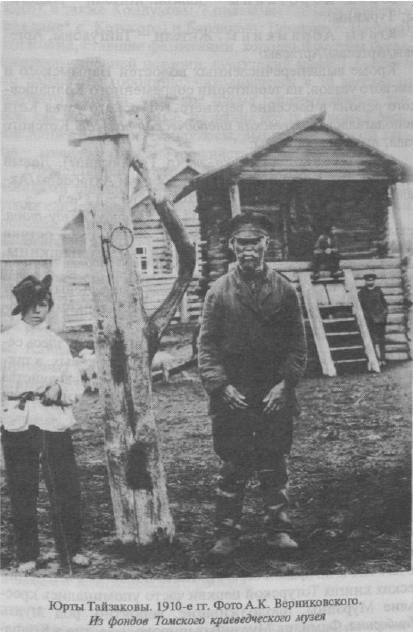
- Southern Selkup man

Regions with significant populations
- Russia: Tomsk Oblast; Yamalo-Nenets Autonomous Okrug: 4,249 (2002)

Languages
- Selkup languages

Religion
- Shamanism, Russian Orthodoxy

Related ethnic groups
- Nganasans, Nenets, Enets, Kets, Siberian Tatars

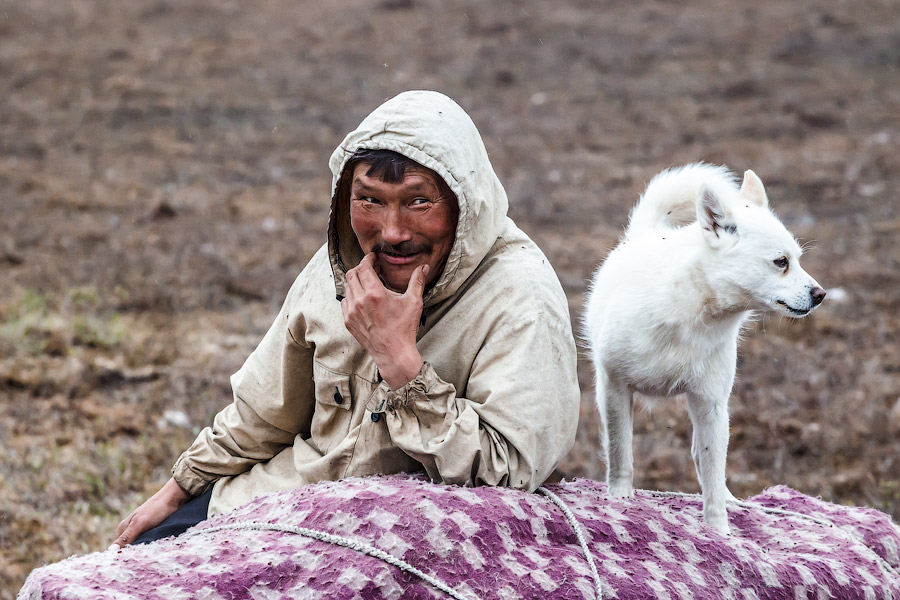
Selkup man with his dog

The Selkup (Russian: селькупы, romanized: sel'kupy) are an Indigenous people of Siberia traditionally settling in the northern parts of Tomsk Oblast, Krasnoyarsk Krai and Tyumen Oblast (with Yamalo-Nenets Autonomous Okrug). Their original language belongs to the Samoyedic branch of the Uralic family.

The Selkups are included in the list of so-called Indigenous small-numbered peoples of the North, Siberia, and the Far East of Russia.

== Ethnonyms ==
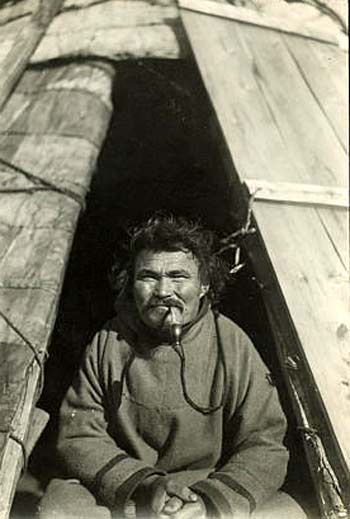
Selkup man from Obdorsk, Ob river

The name Selkup (Russian sel'kupy (plural)) was originally a self-designation of one group of Northern Selkups in the Taz River basin, but came to be applied to all the other local groups between the 1930s and 1980s.

In Russian, the Selkup used to call themselves Ostyak. This name is originally an exonym originating from the 17th century, when it was used to denote the Ob-Ugrian and Samoyed population of the Middle Ob region. By the end of the 20th century the name had been adopted by the Selkup as an endonym.

In the scientific literature from 1850s until the 1930s, the Selkup were exclusively called Ostyak-Samoyeds (остяко-самоеды, ostyako-samoyedy). This ethnonym has never been widely used.

== Language ==
Traditionally, all Selkups spoke a variant of the Selkup language, which belongs to the Samoyedic branch of the Uralic language family. Selkup is an endangered language today because as a result of linguistic marginalization and language shift only some 600 people out of the general Selkup population still use the native language. It is also not included in basic education.

== History ==
The Selkups originated in the middle basin of the Ob River, from interactions between the aboriginal Yeniseian population and Samoyedic peoples that came to the region from the Sayan Mountains during the early part of the first millennium CE. In the 13th century, the Selkups came under the sway of the Mongols. Around 1628, the Russians conquered the area and the Selkups were subjugated. The Selkups joined an uprising against Russian rule but were gunned down and defeated.

In the 17th century, some of the Selkups relocated up north to live along the Taz River and Turukhan River. They were engaged mainly in hunting, fishing, and reindeer breeding. The arrival of Russians colonists to the area in the 18th century led to the Russians hunting down the reindeers the Selkups relied on, which made breeding reindeer much more difficult. During the same period, the Russians attempted to Russify and Christianize the Selkups. However, many retained some of their ancient religious beliefs and customs.

During the Soviet period, the Selkups were forced to adopt a settled lifestyle and their traditional culture witnessed a severe decline. The Selkups have been facing cultural extinction and assimilation from Russian culture. They also suffer from racial discrimination, unemployment and alcoholism.

According to a recent genetic study, subclade Q1a2a1-L54 was mainly found in Yeniseian (Ket) and Samoyedic (Enets and Selkup) speakers. Genetic evidence showed that ancestors of the sampled Yeniseian and Samoyedic speakers had genetic affinities to northern Altaians with high frequencies of haplogroup Q-M242 (xL54), while southern Altaians had many L54 samples and showed similarities with Turkic-speaking populations (Dulik et al. 2012b; Battaglia et al. 2013; Flegontov et al. 2016). However, Yeniseian and Samoyedic samples in the latest study belonged to L54, which was different from the results of previous studies (xL54). In view of the time estimates the researchers postulated that Q1a2a1-L54 had migrated from the southern Altai region and was assimilated into Yeniseian and Samoyedic speaking populations during a recent historical period. They live in the northern parts of Tomsk Oblast, Krasnoyarsk Krai and Tyumen Oblast (with Yamalo-Nenets Autonomous Okrug).

== Population and ethnic groups ==
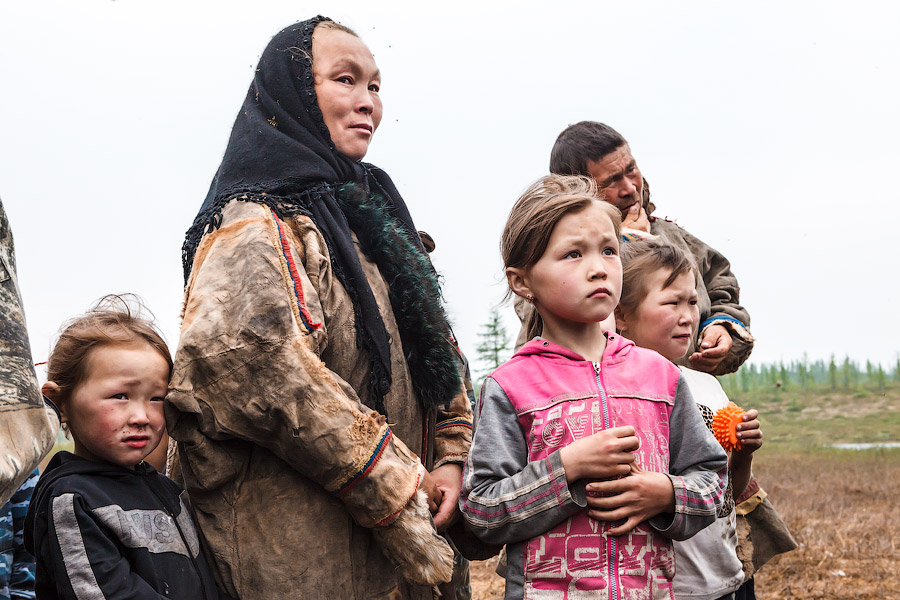
Selkups in the taiga

According to the 2002 Census, there were 4,249 Selkups in Russia (4,300 in 1970). There were 62 Selkups in Ukraine, only one of whom is a native speaker of the Selkup language (Ukrainian Census 2001).

The modern Selkup form two geographically isolated groups, the Southern and Northern Selkups. The Southern Selkups, also called Narym Selkups, live mostly within the Tomsk Oblast. The Northern Selkup moved north when Russians started colonizing Siberia. Movement towards north happened in several waves.

The main Selkup settlements in Siberia are Krasnoselkup and Kargasok.

== Culture ==
The Selkups traditionally engaged in hunting, fishing, and reindeer herding as subsistence. The Selkups also utilized dugout canoes to sail on rivers.

== Genetics ==
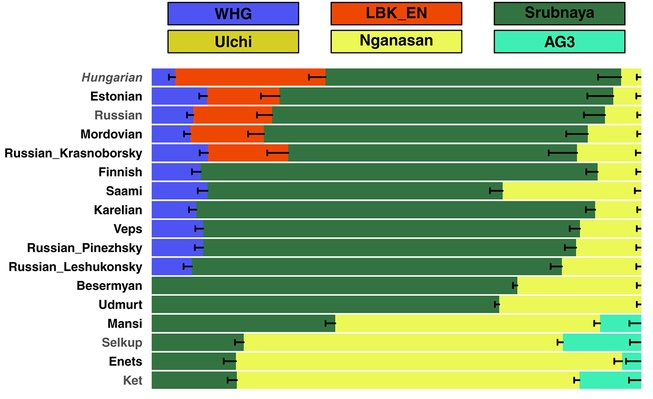
Estimated ancestry components among selected Eurasian populations. The yellow component represents Neo-Siberian ancestry (represented by Nganasans).

Northern Selkups: Y-DNA haplogroups Q-L56>L53>L54>Q1b1a3-L330 (66,4 %), R1a (19%), N1a2b-P43 (6,9 %), R1b (6,1 %), C (1,5 %). Southern Selkups with Y-DNA haplogroup R1b belong to the subclade of R1b1b1-M73, which is found mainly in Central Asia and not to the subclade of R1b1b2-M269, which the majority of the population of Western Europe belongs to. In Southern Selkups have been found the following Y-DNA haplogroups: N1b-A (31,25 %), N1b-E (6,25 %), Q1a3-L330 (25%), Q1a3-L53* (18,75 %), Q1a2 (6,25 %), R1b-M73 (12,5 %).

== Notable people ==
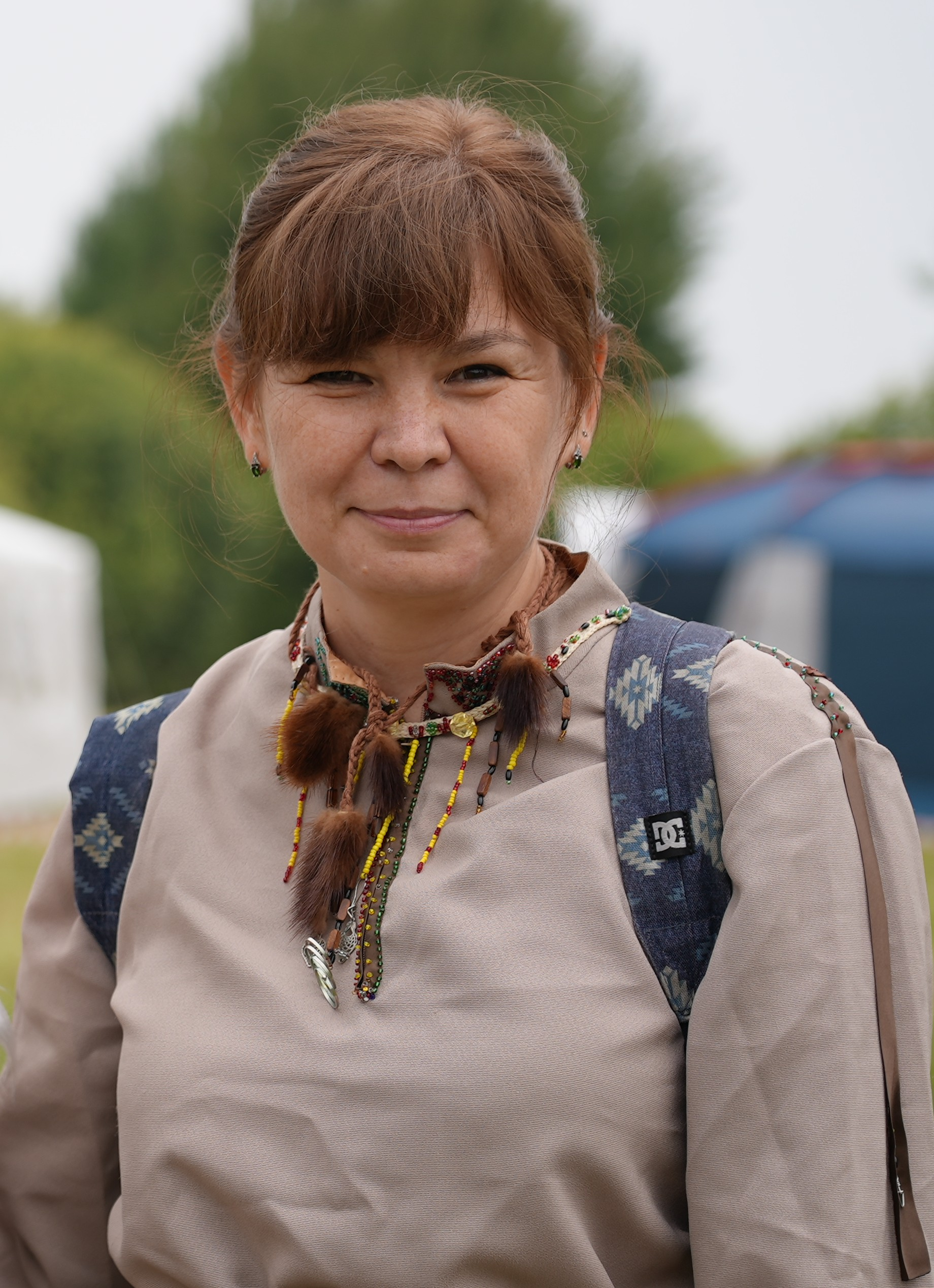
Daria Egereva, a Selkup from Moscow

In 1911–1912 and 1914, the expeditions of the Finnish linguist and ethnographer Kai Reinhold Donner (1888–1935) were engaged in studying the language, folklore, everyday culture and the traditional way of life of the Selkups. A famous Selkupologist from Russia was Eugene Helimski.

== Daria Egereva ==
A prominent advocate for improving the language situation and reforming school education for the Selkups, including the implementation of Selkup-language instruction, has been Daria Egereva. She is also known as a climate and human rights activist and as Co-Chair of the International Indigenous Peoples Forum on Climate Change (IIPFCC), an official caucus representing Indigenous peoples within the framework of the United Nations Framework Convention on Climate Change (UNFCCC) and the UN climate negotiations. Egereva was detained on 17 December 2025 by the Russian regime and is accused of alleged “participation in a terrorist organization” under Article 205.5, Part 2 of the Criminal Code of Russia, a charge carrying a potential sentence of ten to twenty years' imprisonment.
